= HH1 =

HH1 or HH-1 may refer to:

== Vehicular and transportation ==
- HH-1 Huey, a military helicopter
- PRR HH1, a steam locomotive
- Sindlinger Hawker Hurricane, a homebuilt aircraft
- HH1, a model in the series of Honda Acty trucks

== Other uses ==
- Tetulomab (HH1), an experimental cancer drug
- HH1, one of the Hamburger–Hamilton stages in chick development
- HH 1/2, the first Herbig-Haro object identified
- On Basilisk Station, the first novel in the Honor Harrington series by David Weber, abbreviated HH1

== See also ==
- HHL (disambiguation)
- HHI (disambiguation)
- H1 (disambiguation)
