= H1 =

H1, H-1, H01, H I may refer to:

== Transportation, places, sports, and astronomy ==
=== Roads, automotive, and biking ===
- Interstate H-1, a highway in Hawaii
- H1 Lamp, an automotive halogen light bulb
- Haval H1, a Chinese subcompact crossover
- Hummer H1, an American full-size SUV
- Hyundai H-1, a South Korean commercial van
- Tiger H1, a German heavy tank used during WW2
- Kawasaki H1 Mach III, road motorcycle
- Kawasaki H1R, racing motorcycle
- H1 (classification), a para-cycling classification

=== Water sports and vehicles ===
- H1 Unlimited, a premier unlimited hydroplane racing league
- HMS H1, a 1915 British Royal Navy H-class submarine
- HMS Hotspur (H01), a 1935 British Royal Navy H-class destroyer
- USS H-1, a 1913 United States Navy submarine

=== Rail ===
- Ceylon Government Railway H1, a class of steam locomotives
- LB&SCR H1 class, a class of British steam locomotives
- LNER Class H1, a class of British steam locomotives
- Designation for METRORail Siemens S70 light rail vehicles

=== Aviation ===
- Bell Huey family Bell H-1, series of helicopters with that designation
- Hooters Air airline
- Hughes H-1 Racer, a racing aircraft

=== Space exploration ===
- H I region, a cloud in the interstellar medium
- H-I or H–1, a Japanese rocket
- Rocketdyne H-1, a liquid-propellant rocket engine
- Tianwen-1 (formerly Huoxing-1), first Chinese space probe to reach Mars

=== Other places ===
- Area H1, the area of Hebron controlled by the Palestinian Authority under the Hebron Protocol

== Computing and electronics ==
- <h1></h1>, level 1 heading markup for HTML Web pages; see HTML element
- Unitree H1, a humanoid robot developed by Unitree Robotics
- DSC-H1, a Sony Cybershot digital camera

== Science ==
- Alternative hypothesis (H_{1})

=== Biology and medicine ===
- British NVC community H1, a heath zone
- Histamine H1 receptor
- Histone H1, a protein
- Haplogroup H1 (disambiguation), a grouping in genetics based on certain similarities
- ATC code H01 Pituitary and hypothalamic hormones and analogues, a subgroup of the Anatomical Therapeutic Chemical Classification System

=== Chemistry and physics ===
- Hydrogen atom (H_{1})
- Protium (isotope), an isotope of hydrogen
- H-1NF, the Australian Plasma Fusion Research Facility, formerly H-1 Heliac stellarator
- H1 (particle detector)

== Time and date ==
- H1, John Harrison's first marine chronometer
- H1 may refer to the first half of the business year, while H2 refers to the second half.

== Other uses ==
- *h₁, one of the three laryngeals in the reconstructed Proto-Indo-European language
- Hora Um da Notícia, a news program aired by Rede Globo

== See also ==
- Hello Internet (HI), a podcast
- H-1B visa
- HI (disambiguation)
- HL (disambiguation)
- 1H (disambiguation)
- H (disambiguation)
- 1 (disambiguation)
