= 1H =

100y or 1-H may refer to:

== Science ==
- Hydrogen (_{1}H), a chemical element
- 1H, a number of chemical compounds with one hydrogen atom
- Hydrogen-1 (^{1}H, or Protium), an isotope of hydrogen
- 1H, a grouping within an Astronomical catalog
  - 1H 1617-155, a designation for the Scorpius X-1 X-ray source
  - 1H 1908+047, a designation for the SS 433 star system
- Astra 1H, an SES satellite launched in 1999

== Other uses ==
- 1H, a model of Nissan H engine
- 1H NMR, a type of Proton NMR
- 1 H. Cas, a variant notation for AR Cassiopeiae
- UH-1H, a type of Bell UH-1 Iroquois
- Campath-1H, a brand of Alemtuzumab
- Ardiden 1H, a model of HAL/Turbomeca Shakti
- Blendkörper 1H, smoke grenade used by Germany in World War II
- SSH 1H, alternate name for Washington State Route 534
- 1H, one hour
- 1H Year, 1st half of year

== See also ==
- H1 (disambiguation)
