= Pampanga State Agricultural University =

Public university in Pampanga, Philippines

- Pamahalaang Pamantasang Pang-agrikultura ng Pampanga (Filipino)
- Other name: PSAU
- Former names: La Granja Modelo de Luzon; La Escuela Pecuaria; Magalang Farm School; Pampanga Agricultural School; Pampanga National Agricultural School; Pampanga Agricultural College; Pampanga Agricultural State College
- Motto: The University with a Heart for Humane (HUManity Agriculture Nature and Entrepreneurship) and Blissful Development.
- Type: State university, research, non-profit, coeducational, higher education institution
- Established: 1886
- Accreditation: AACUP, Level III University & CHED, Level IV University
- Academic affiliations: Level IV University
- President: Anita G. David, Ed.D.
- Vice-president: Mina Lyn G. Alviz, M.A.Ed. (VP for Administration, Business & Finance); Sylvia S. De Guzman, Ed.D. (VP for Academic Affairs); Geraldine C. Sanchez, Ph.D. (VP for Research, Innovation, Extension & Training); Lyndon G. Solis, DT (VP for Planning and Resource Generation)
- Dean: Rafael R. Rafael, Ph.D. (College of Agriculture Systems and Technology); Evelyn V. Totaan, Ph.D. (College of Arts and Sciences); Leslie V. Torres, MPS (College of Business, Economics and Entrepreneurship); Elmer P. Calaguas, Ph.D. (College of Education); Madeliene R. Solis, DT (College of Engineering and Computer Studies); Darwin E. Totaan, Ph.D. (College of Forestry and Agro- Forestry); Neil C. Tanquilut, Ph.D. (College of Veterinary Medicine); Jasmin S. Villanueva, Ed.D. (Graduate School)
- Administrative staff: 121
- Students: 8,199 as of 1st Semester A.Y. 2025-2026
- Location: Magalang, Pampanga, 2011, Philippines; 15°13′08″N 120°41′43″E
- Campus: Its main campus is located at Magalang, Pampanga; A satellite campus located at Floridablanca, Pampanga and a extension class located at San Luis, Pampanga
- Newspaper: Sinukuan Gazette
- Hymn: PSAU HYMN
- Colors: Green and Golden Yellow
- Nickname: Sinukuan Vanguards
- Website: psau.edu.ph
- Location in Luzon Location in the Philippines

Pampanga State Agricultural University, abbreviated as PSAU, is a state-owned agricultural university, located at the western slope of Mt. Arayat, in Magalang, Pampanga, Philippines.

== History ==
The idea of establishing an agricultural experiment station was hatched in 1873 by Spanish businessman Don Bernardo Garcia Coteron and his partner, Don Jose Pesaña Piñol. The proposed experiment station was named La Granja Modelo de Luzon (The Model Farm of Luzon). They applied for a royal grant in the same year, and it was granted in 1874. The granja will serve an experiment station for their company, Coteron y Compañia, for propagation, experimentation and cultivation of their cash crops especially in tobacco. It has 300 hectares of land, located in San Isidro, Nueva Ecija, and took years to construct necessary structures.

On November 15, 1881, with the creation of La Comision Agronomica de Filipinas, it took over the operations of granja and appointed its first director, Don Jose Alemany Penalva. Due to the insufficient and poor condition of the land, on March 20, 1885, the Spanish government transferred the granja from San Isidro, Nueva Ecija to the foothills of Mt. Arayat in Magalang, Pampanga. Its governing charter was issued by Queen Maria Christina on January 30, 1886. It was placed under the advocation of Our Lady of Montserrat. The new land has 900 hectares, cleared mostly by the polistas. The granja was transformed into a full agricultural experiment station equipped with school and staff buildings, animal pens, sugar mill, alcohol distillery and weather observatory. The station was headed by a director (equivalent to agricultural engineer), assisted by an ayundante de montes and a perito agricola, who were all Spaniards. It also housed a 50-man companias disciplinarias providing rotational security to the granja.

The granja offered two programs; the first and most important was a three-year sequence in farm management, leading to the title of perito agricola. The candidates who wanted this title had to demonstrate the possession of suitable secondary-level schooling in geometry, trigonometry, drawing physics, and chemistry, prior to entrance. The other program, which conferred the title of capataz de cultivo, concerned itself with the preparation of field foremen and livestock supervisors. Those who obtained these titles were conferred as graduates equivalent to a college graduate both in the Philippines and Spain. The granja has a variety of breeds of animals such as buffaloes, cattle, wild pigs, goats, horses, chickens, ducks and doves. La Granja was devoted to the cultivation and experimentation of wheat, sorghum, sesame, rice, corn, indigo, tobacco, peanuts, potatoes, sugarcane and alfalfa.

On June 30, 1887, La Granja Modelo de Luzon won the highest diploma honor award from Exposicion de Filipinas held in Madrid, Spain in the field of agriculture, especially in the cultivation and exhibition of tobacco and different varieties of corn. (La Granja Modelo won the award together with famous Filipinos such as Juan Luna who won the same award for his masterpiece, Una Mestiza; Felix Resurreccion Hidalgo, gold medal awardee for his masterpiece, La Barca de Aqueronte; and the father of Filipino socialism, Isabelo de los Reyes, silver medal awardee for his selection, Folklore Filipina.)

In 1891, the granja was transformed by Governor General Valeriano Weyler into La Escuela Pecuaria (the Livestock School). The school was expanded, focusing on the study and breeding of cattle. In 1894, the weather observatory become fully operational with telegraph lines connected with the Observatorio de Manila. In 1895, the granja pioneered the experiment and study of different Central American varieties of peanuts and teosintes. On January 23, 1894, it won the silver medal award from Exposicion Regional de Filipinas in the field of cross breeding of Arabian horses, exhibition of different rice varieties and different types of farm equipment.

At the outbreak of the revolution, it was used as one of the hideouts of the Spanish troops fighting the insurgents in Camansi. During the Philippine–American War, it served as a grazing area for cavalry horses and a training ground for American troops.

After the war, on November 26, 1901, the Department of Public Instruction recommended the establishing of an agricultural school in granja, but it was never implemented. In 1902, it was reopened by the Americans as an agricultural experiment station under Bureau of Agriculture, with Lt. Col. Charles Hatfield designated officer in charge. On July 26, 1904, Governor General Luke Edward Wright issued Executive Order No. 33 declaring additional areas to expand the experiment station's area to 1,050 hectares and naming it as the Magalang Reserve, to be used for agricultural experiment purposes. In 1918, it started to offer agricultural intermediate and high school education and named as Magalang Farm School and later as Pampanga Agricultural School; Frank Ebbesen was appointed the first principal. Subsequently, Commonwealth Act No. 313, enacted in 1938, made the school a national institution and named it as Pampanga National Agricultural School. During World War II, it was shut down and became a military training camp of the Japanese forces. After the war, it reopened and continued operations. The Huk insurgency forced the school to suspend classes until peace and order returned in 1955.

On June 19, 1965, President Diosdado P. Macapagal signed Republic Act No. 4576, upgrading the school to tertiary level to become the Pampanga Agricultural College. It completed its upgrading to college status in 1974, with Supt. Felix V. Remigio appointed first college president. Upon his retirement, Dr. Fortunato Battad was installed college president on April 7, 1976. Upon the transfer of Dr. Battad in 1983, Dr. Fredeswinda R. Serrano was designated officer-in-charge from November to December, 1983. Subsequently, Dr. Ladislao Avila was designated officer-in-charge until April 30, 1984. On May 1, 1984, Dr. Ramon Simbulan was designated by then President Ferdinand E. Marcos as acting president of the college. On July 25, 1986, he was appointed as full-fledged president of the college by President Corazon C. Aquino. He was appointed to a second term by President Fidel V. Ramos. Dr. Simbulan was succeeded by Dr. Zosimo M. Battad, who in turn was succeeded by Dr. Honorio Soriano Jr.

During Soriano's administration, on June 11, 2013, Republic Act No. 10605 was signed into law by President Benigno S. Aquino III, converting the college into a state university as Pampanga State Agricultural University. The Commission on Higher Education was tasked by the law to evaluate the college for its compliance with the requirements for university status. On January 13, 2015, CHED issued En Banc Resolution No. 006-2015, officially granting the full university status to the college; it was the first state college in the Philippines granted university status by CHED based on merits.

On March 6, 2023, Board of Regents appointed Dr. Anita G. David as the second University President of PSAU. She is also the first Female University President of PSAU.

Bongbong Marcos signed on February 15, 2024 the 4-page Republic Act No. 11977, the “Pampanga State Agricultural University-Floridablanca Campus Act.” The PSAU-Floridablanca Campus will offer short-term, technical-vocational, undergraduate, and graduate courses within its areas of competency and specialization.

PAC- PSAU Leaders
Name	Position	Term
Mr. Felix V. Remigio	College President	1974- 1976
Dr. Fortunato A. Battad	College President	1976- 1983
Dr. Fredeswinda R. Serrano	OIC- College President	1983
Dr. Ladislao P. Avila	OIC- College President	1984
Dr. Ramon L. Simbulan	OIC- College President	1984- 1986
Dr. Ramon L. Simbulan	College President	1986- 1999
Dr. Emelita C. Kempis	OIC- College President	1999
Dr. Zosimo M. Battad	College President	1999- 2007
Dr. Honorio M. Soriano Jr.	College President	2007- 2015
Dr. Honorio M. Soriano Jr.	University President	2015- 2021
Ms. Myrna Basa- Lorenzo	OIC- University President	2021
Dr. Anita G. David	OIC- University President	2021- 2022
Dr. Lyndon G. Solis	OIC- University President	2022- 2023
Dr. Anita G. David	University President	2023- Present

== Course offerings ==
=== Graduate ===
- Doctor of Philosophy in Agriculture, majors in:
  - Animal Science
  - Crop Science
- Master of Science in Agriculture, majors in:
  - Animal Science
  - Agronomy
  - Horticulture
- Master of Science in Biology
- Doctor of Education, major in:
  - Educational Management
- Master of Arts in Education, majors in:
  - Educational Management
  - General Science
  - Biology
  - Mathematics
  - Physical Education
  - English

=== Undergraduate ===
==== College of Agriculture Systems and Technology (CASTech) ====
- Bachelor of Science in Agriculture, majors in:
  - Animal Science
  - Crop Science
- Bachelor of Science in Fisheries
- Bachelor of Science in Forestry
- Bachelor of Science in Agro-forestry

==== College of Arts and Sciences (CAS) ====
- Bachelor of Arts in English Language Studies
- Bachelor of Science in Biology
- Bachelor of Science in Mathematics
- Bachelor of Science in Development Communication

==== College of Business, Economics and Entrepreneurship (CBEE) ====
- Bachelor of Science in Agricultural Business
- Bachelor of Science in Agricultural Economics
- Bachelor of Science in Entrepreneurship
- Bachelor of Science in Food Technology
- Bachelor of Science in Hospitality Management

==== College of Education (COED) ====
- Bachelor of Elementary Education, with Areas of Specialization in:
  - General Education
- Bachelor of Secondary Education, majors in:
  - Physical Science
  - Mathematics
  - English
  - Filipino
- Bachelor of Physical Education, major in:
  - School Physical Education
- Bachelor of Technology and Livelihood Education, major in:
  - Industrial Arts
  - Home Economics

==== College of Engineering and Computer Studies (COECS) ====
- Bachelor of Science in Agricultural and Biosystems Engineering
- Bachelor of Science in Geodetic Engineering
- Bachelor of Science in Information Technology
- Bachelor of Science in Computer Engineering
- Bachelor of Science in Civil Engineering

==== College of Veterinary Medicine (CVM) ====
- Doctor of Veterinary Medicine

== Gallery ==
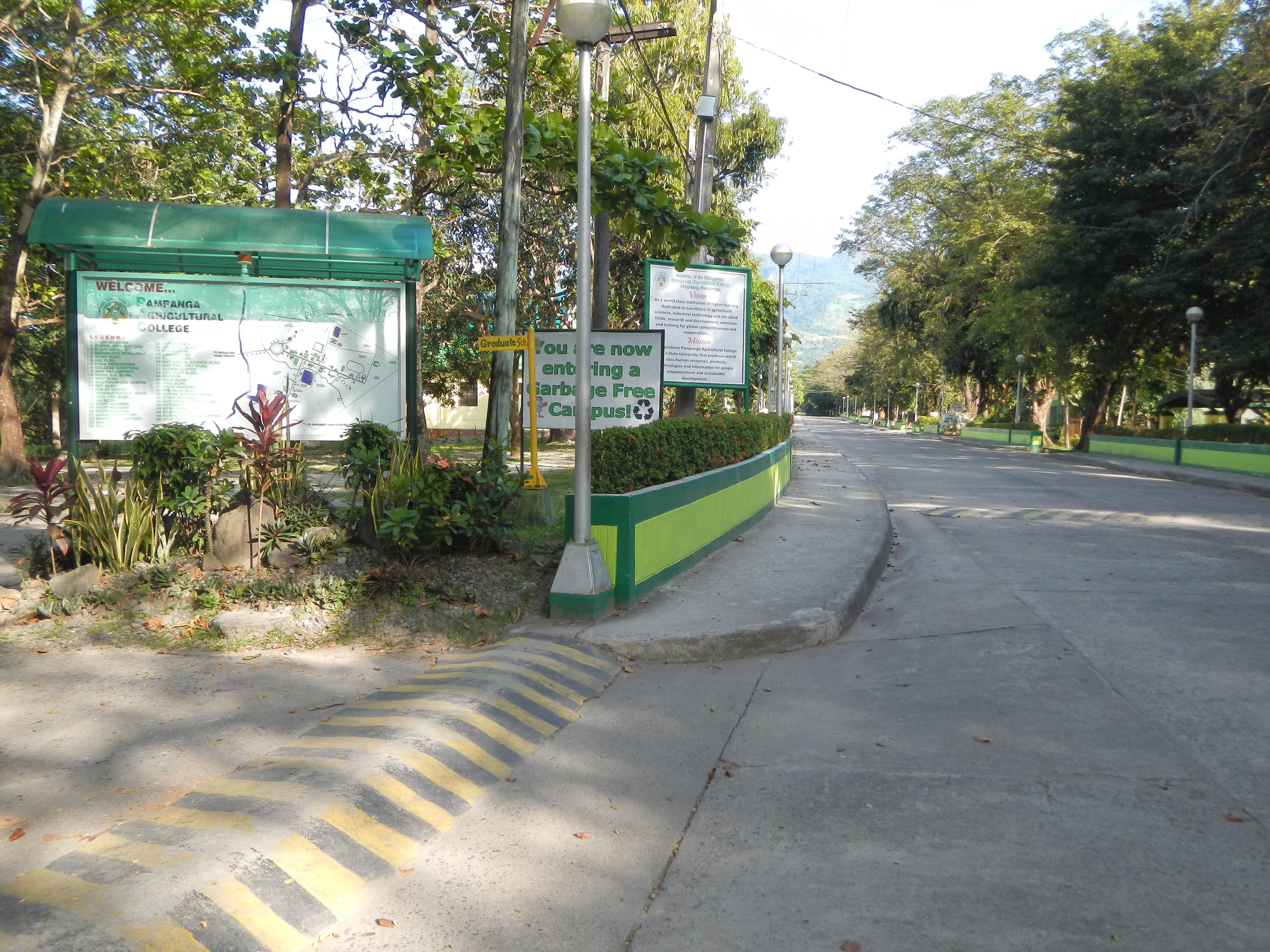
Entrance road to main buildings

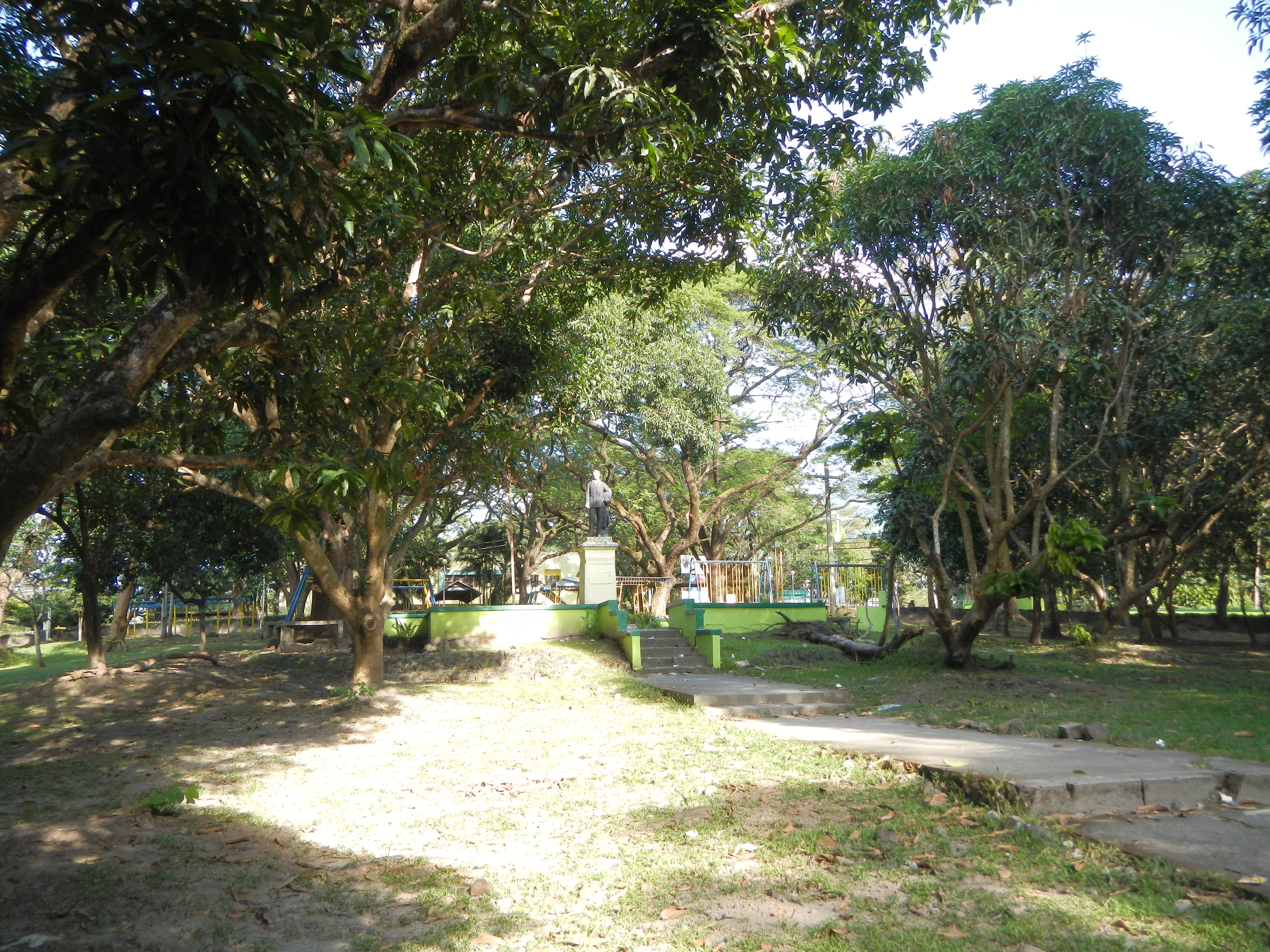
The main park

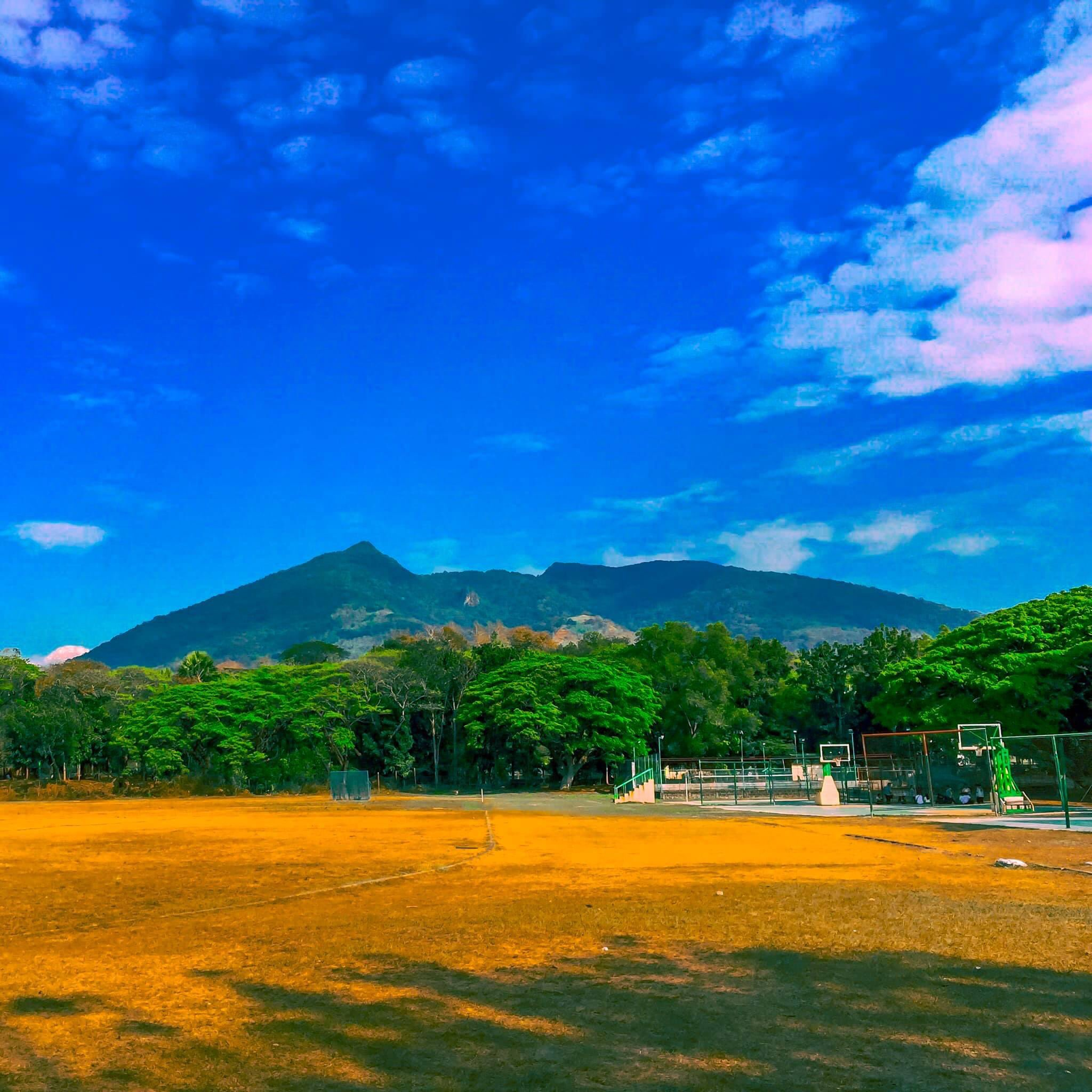
Academic Oval

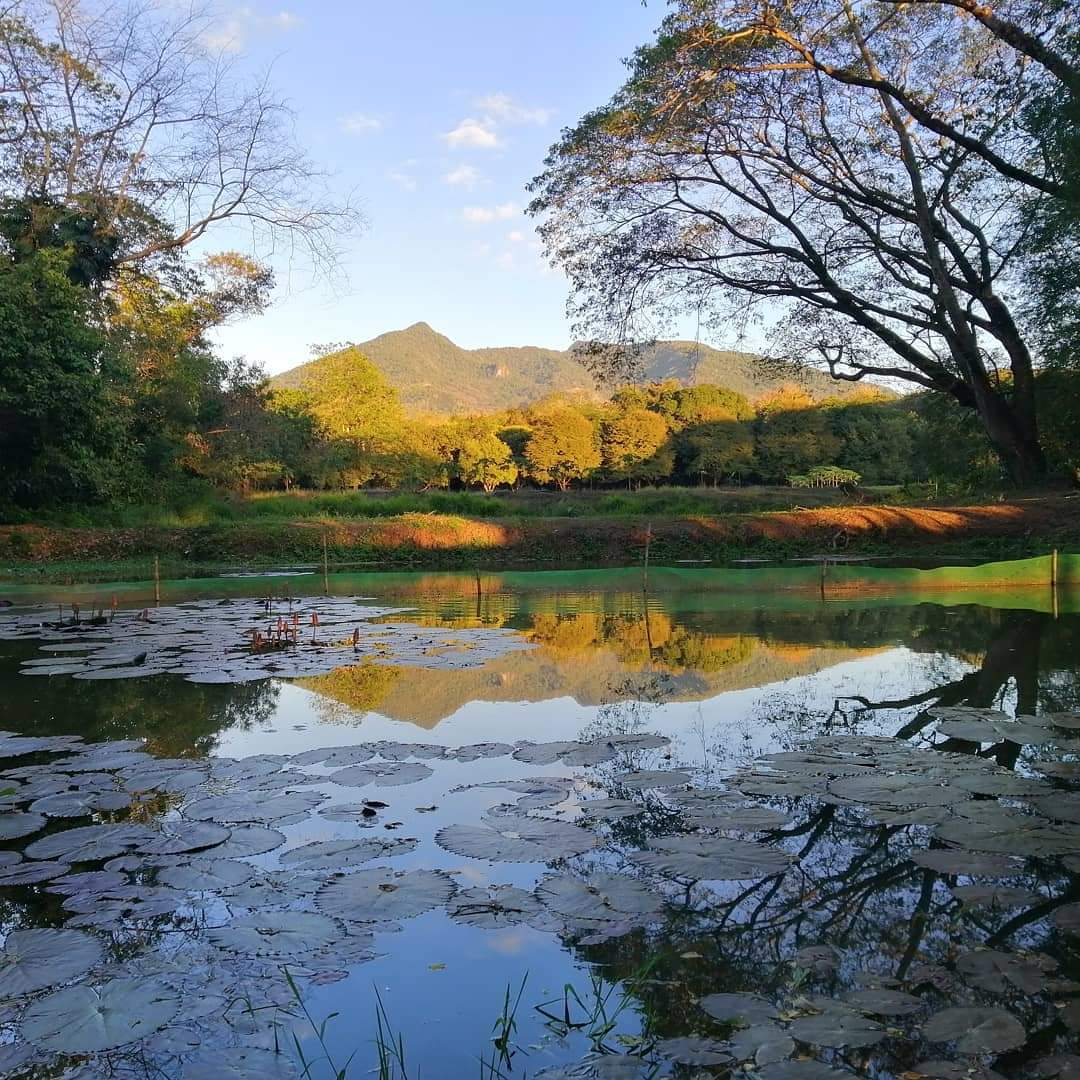
Mt. Arayat seen at PSAU school grounds

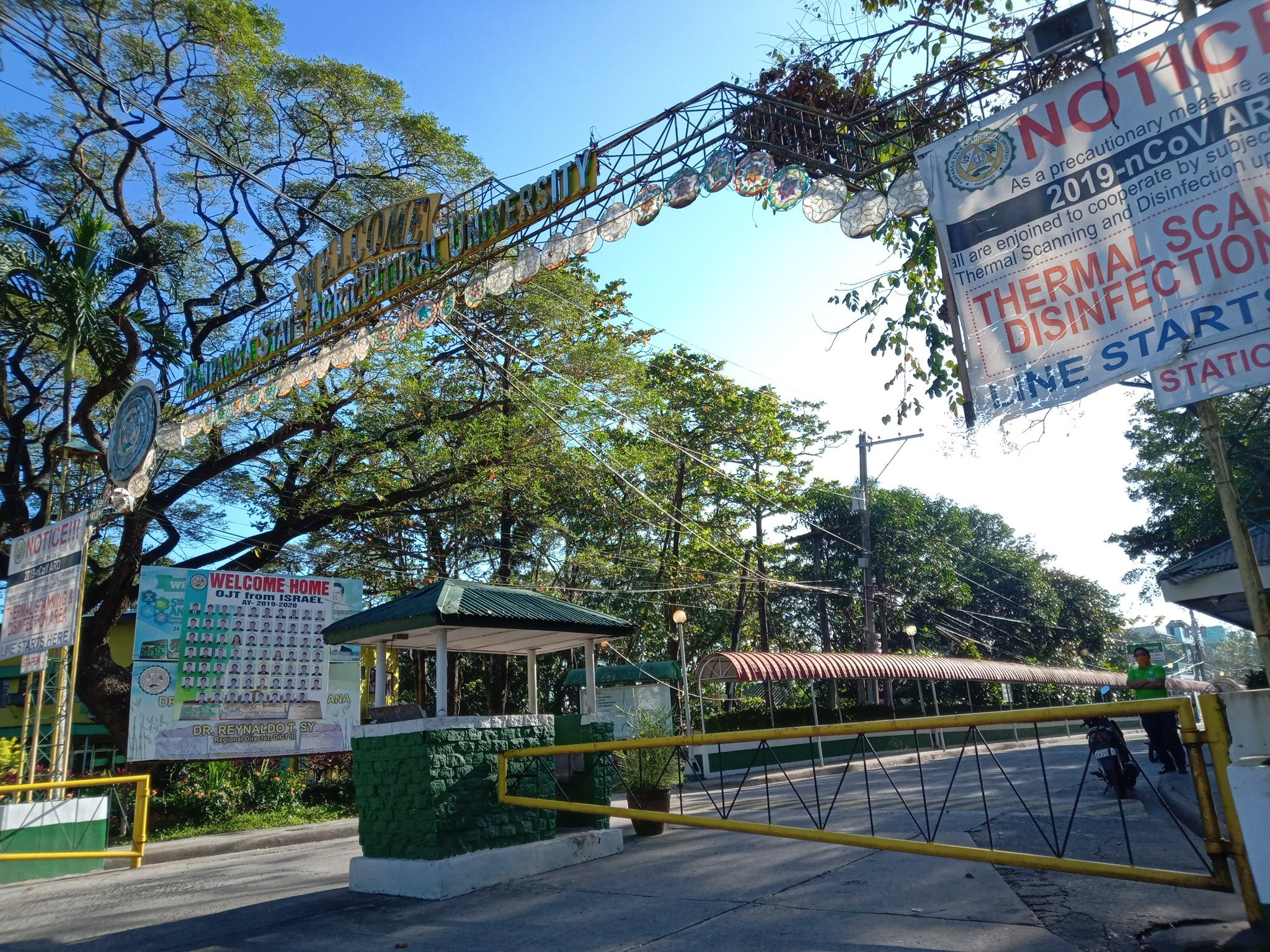
Welcome signage and entrance road of PSAU

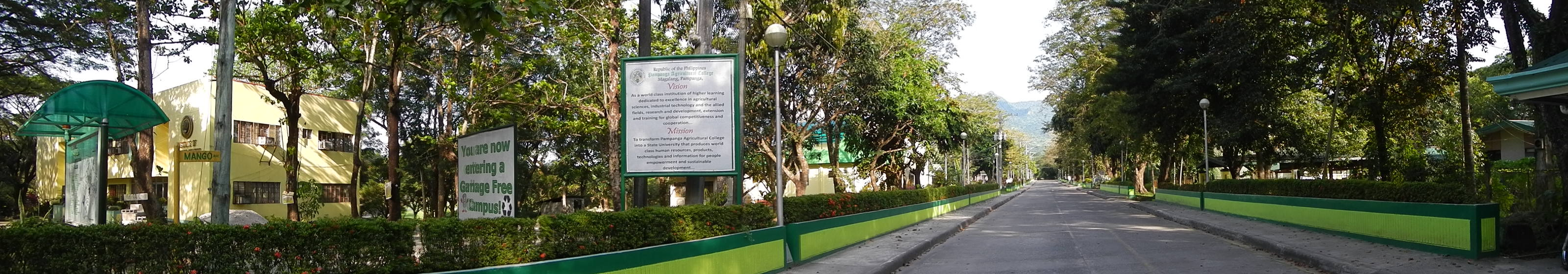
Graduate Studies Building and road panorama

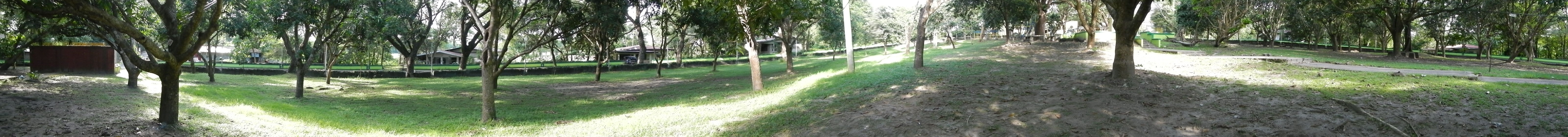
Panorama
