= Mount Arayat =

Potentially active volcano in Pampanga, Philippines

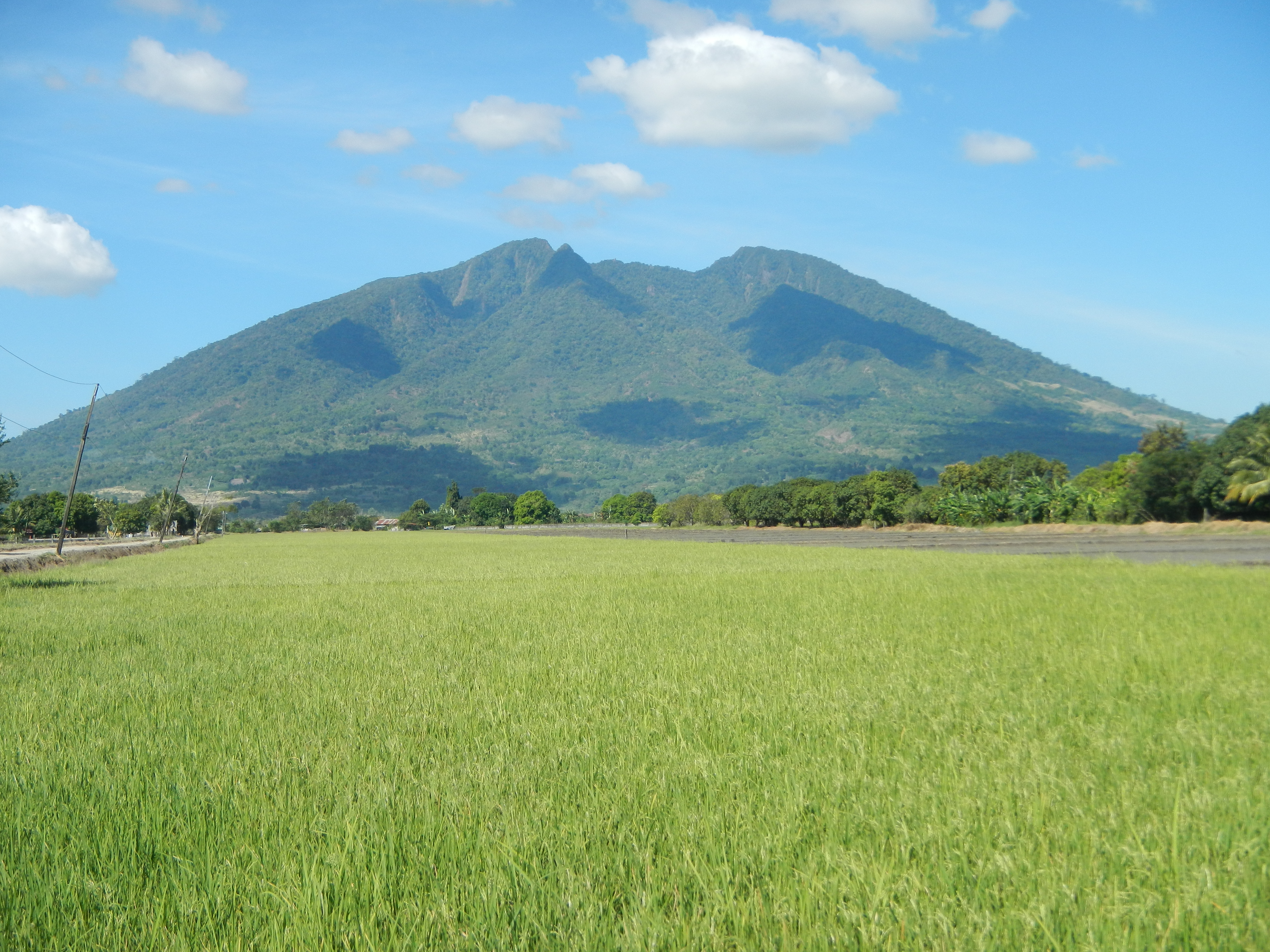
- Mount Arayat as seen from Kaledian (Camba), Arayat, Pampanga

Highest point
- Elevation: 1,026 m (3,366 ft)
- Prominence: 998 m (3,274 ft)
- Listing: potentially active volcano
- Coordinates: 15°12′00″N 120°44′31″E

Geography
- Location within Luzon Location within Philippines
- Location: Mount Arayat National Park
- Country: Philippines
- Region: Central Luzon
- Province: Pampanga
- City/municipality: Arayat; Magalang

Geology
- Mountain type: Stratovolcano
- Volcanic arc: Luzon Volcanic Arc
- Last eruption: Holocene

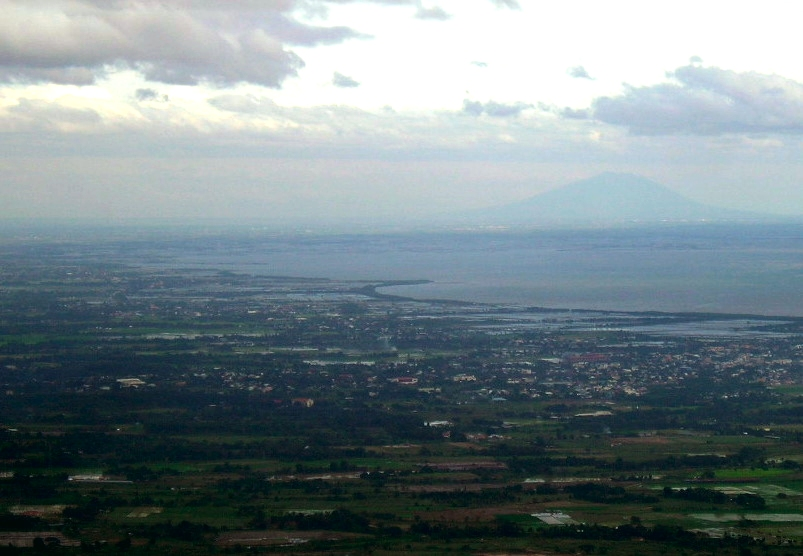
A hazy Mount Arayat as seen from Mount Samat overlooking Manila Bay

Mount Arayat is an isolated, potentially active stratovolcano in the Central Luzon plains. Located within the vast agricultural lands of Pampanga, it rises to a height of 1,026 meters (3,366 ft) above sea level. Its southern half lies within the municipality of Arayat, while its northern half and summit are in Magalang. 10 km (6.21 mi) to the west of Mount Arayat is Angeles City and the former Clark Air Base. The active volcano Mount Pinatubo is located 26 km (16 mi) west, while Manila is located 75 km (47 mi) to the south. Mount Arayat was officially declared a national park in 1933 and a tourist spot in 1997. The mountain is currently under an immense deforestation threat.

Mount Arayat has a breached crater on its northwest side with a smaller andesitic dome in the collapse amphitheater. There are historical records of eruption in Arayat and the only dated rocks are 530- and 650-thousand-year-old basalts predating the collapse and formation of the lava dome. However, weak steam activity is currently present at some of the heavily eroded vents on the northwestern face of the summit. Additionally an analysis report indicates that the volcano erupted over the last 2,000 years, but it is believed to refer to its volcanic activity.

== Etymology ==
The origins of the name "Arayat" are multifaceted and have evolved over time. The earliest mention of the mountain's name in Western sources is in a 1696 travel diary by Italian traveller Gemelli Careri, where it is noted that the natives referred to the mountain as "Bondo Kalaya," later becoming "Bondoc Alaya" (“Mount Alaya"). This eventually transformed into "Arayat.”

Several theories exist regarding the name's origin:

1. One theory suggests that the name "Arayat" originated from Fernándo de Arayat, a Spanish encomiendero, whose birthplace in Spain was called "Arayat." Over time, locals transformed the word to "Daya."
2. Another theory posits that the original vernacular name "Dayat" is derived from "dayatan," which literally means the dry season rice crop, or irrigation of rice paddies during the dry season.
3. A third theory states that "Arayat" was formerly known as "Alaya," meaning "east." Thus, "bunduk alaya" ("eastern mountain") referred to Arayat. This source also suggests "Arayat" is of Spanish origin.
4. A contemporary researcher believes Mount Arayat is Mount Ararat where Noah's Ark landed in the Book of Genesis. This theory does not explain the etymological background of the modern name, and the existence of Mount Ararat near the Turkish-Armenian border.

Additionally, some sources distinguish between "Aláya" as the name of the mountain and "Aráyat" as the name of the town.

== History ==
=== Philippine Revolution ===
During the Philippine Revolution, the revolutionaries retreated to Mount Arayat after the failure of the Cry of Nueva Ecija in September 1896, when the Spanish launched a counter-attack in San Isidro.

In September 1897, Gen. Francisco Macabulos retreated southeast to Mount Arayat along with his men to avoid capture by Spanish authorities in Tarlac, which used to be under the control of his forces. Several engagements occurred here afterwards until his surrender on January 15, 1898.

=== World War II ===
On Mount Arayat, the American guerilla Colonel Thorpe was captured by Imperial Japanese forces on December 10, 1942, during World War II.

Mount Arayat was then used as a hiding place for communist Filipino guerrillas called the Hukbalahap afterwards. Nicanor "Bapa" Songco devised a plan to spread information of their escape to Mount Arayat as a safety measure during the escalating conflict. This enabled the survival of their families from Bulacan, Pampanga and Nueva Ecija, who joined their escape. When they discovered Japanese soldiers had arrived they fled to Mount Arayat, but just before their ascent, Japanese officers intercepted them. Songco surrendered in exchange for everyone else's safety, and was tortured by having his skin flayed from his arm. He was released by the Japanese and returned to Mount Arayat and his family.

== Geography ==
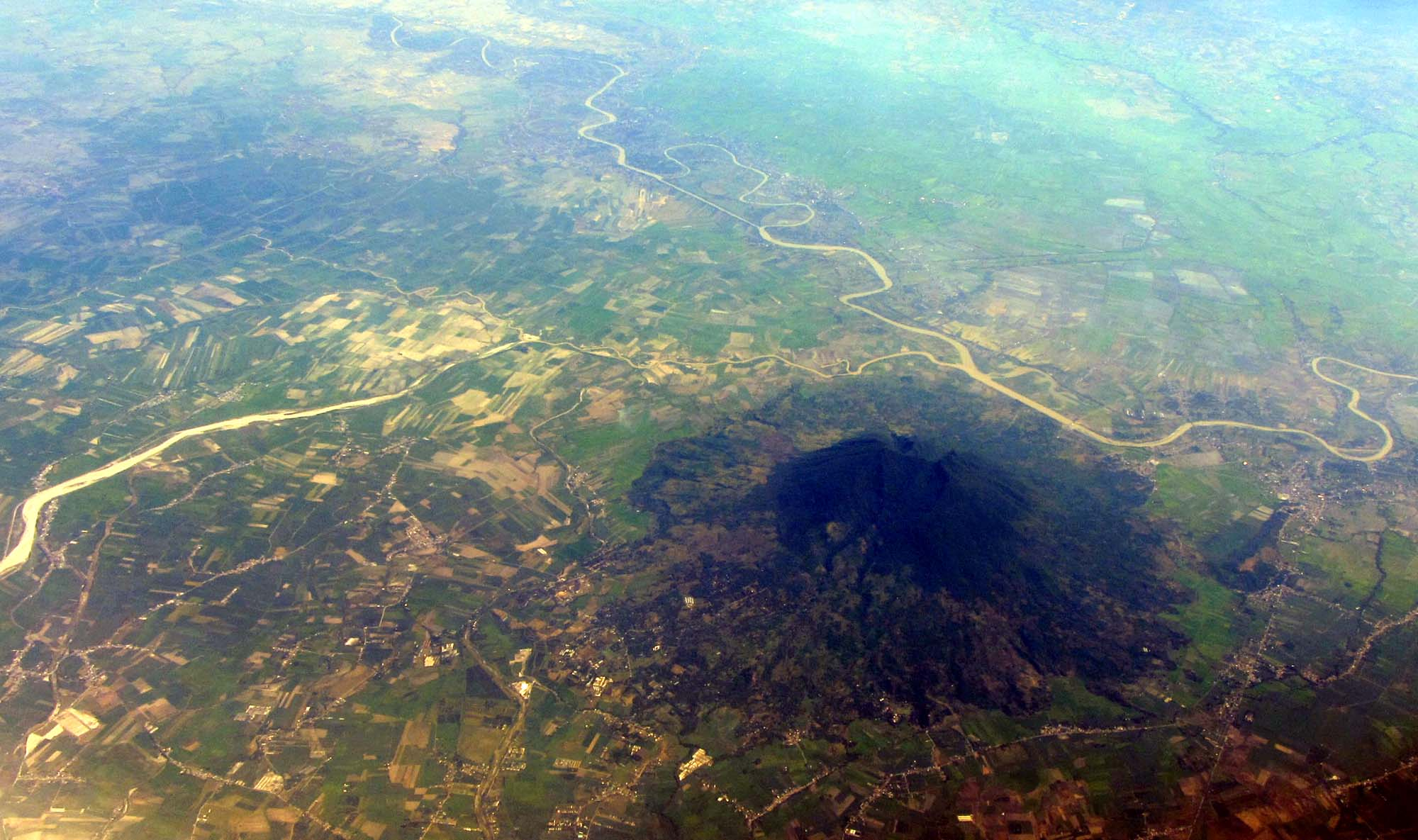
Aerial view of Mt. Arayat with nearby Pampanga (right) and Sacobia (left) rivers

Mount Arayat stands in the middle of the largely-agricultural 15 to 35 metres (49 to 115 ft) AMSL Central Luzon Plain, serving as a distinct landmark in Pampanga province. The mountain is topped by a circular volcanic crater about 1.2 kilometres (0.75 mi) in diameter, much of which has collapsed on the western and part of the northern rim due to erosion. This has resulted in a breached crater which opens in a west-northwest direction. This area is the apparent source of a major debris-avalanche deposit that forms hummocky terrain beyond the west and northwest sides of the volcano. The 1,026-metre (3,366 ft) summit stands on the northeast side of the breached crater, known as North Peak, while the 984-metre (3,228 ft) Pinnacle Peak is located on the southeast crater rim. Post-collapse activity formed an andesitic lava dome known as White Rock in the collapse amphitheater.

== Eruptions ==
There are no cultural records of historic eruptions. However, weak steaming is currently present in some of the heavily eroded vents on the northwestern side of the summit. The ancient eruptions were said to have caused the formation of a lava dome on the western slopes of the mountain known as White Rock, which is a tourist destination and research site by students of Pampanga State Agricultural University. The Arayat amphitheatre is said to have been caused by the summit's collapse on the western side but a much deeper crater is present on the eastern side, it was said that the mountain was once a volcanic island, until eruptions covered the surrounding area with soil, eruptions were said to be the possible cause of a hypothesised re-routing of Pampanga River, which is said to have once passed on the western side rather than its present course on the eastern side.

== Geology ==
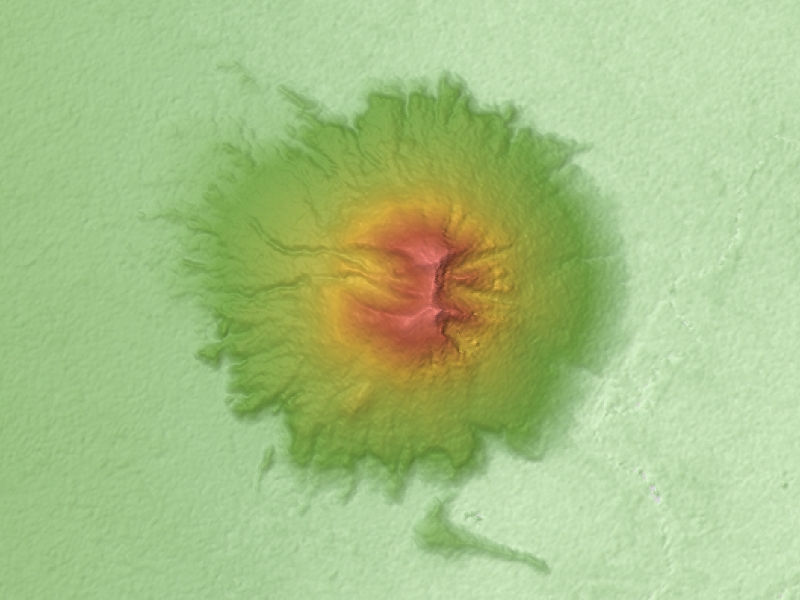
Mount Arayat SRTM-1 relief map

Rock types are basalt and andesite. The only rocks reported to have been dated are 0.53 and 0.65 million-year-old basalts. These predate the crater collapse and formation of the lava dome known as White Rock, which could have occurred in the last 2,000 years. The mountain which is believed to be several peaks merged at the top by some local people is actually a single-cone stratovolcano.

== Flora ==
Pyrostria arayatensis is a plant species belonging to the family Rubiaceae. It was discovered by researchers from Angeles University Foundation and the University of Santo Tomas during botanical surveys conducted in Mount Arayat National Park, and was formally described in Annales Botanici Fennici in 2020.

== Hiking activity ==
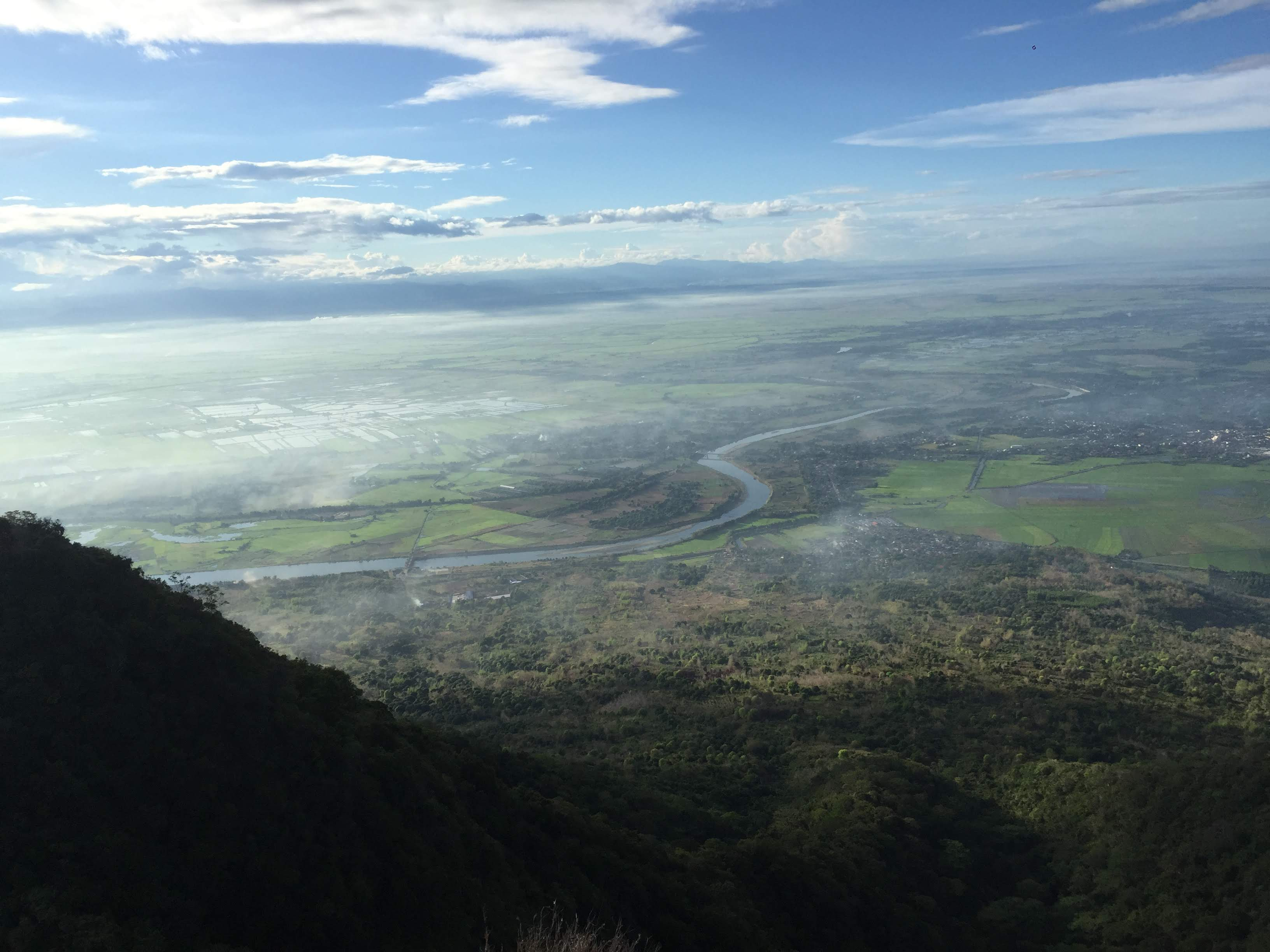
View from Mount Arayat summit

Two trails lead to the peaks of Mount Arayat. Mount Arayat National Park Located at San Juan Baño in Arayat, Pampanga has a trail to the southern Peak, taking around 3–4 hours to reach the peak. The souther peak offers views of Central Luzon, including a view of the Pampanga River. The collapsed western alone that forms the other half of its caldera-like crater can also be seen. It offers a view of the mountains of Zambales and Bataan (to the west), and the mountains of the Sierra Madre range (to the east). The northern or higher peak can be accessed from Pampanga State Agricultural University in Magalang, with a similar time to reach the peak through the Arayat Amphitheatre and White Rock, which legend says is the home of Apung/Aring Sinukuan. There are two other trails on Mount Arayat's slopes as of 2017: the pinnacle, which is a knife edge monkey trail, and the TKO, which is the hardest trail in San Juan Baño. However, these two features, the Pinnacle and TKO, cannot be considered peaks because they are not prominent unlike the north and south peaks, and thus are only considered as view decks as per international mountaineering definitions.

=== Arayat in folklore ===
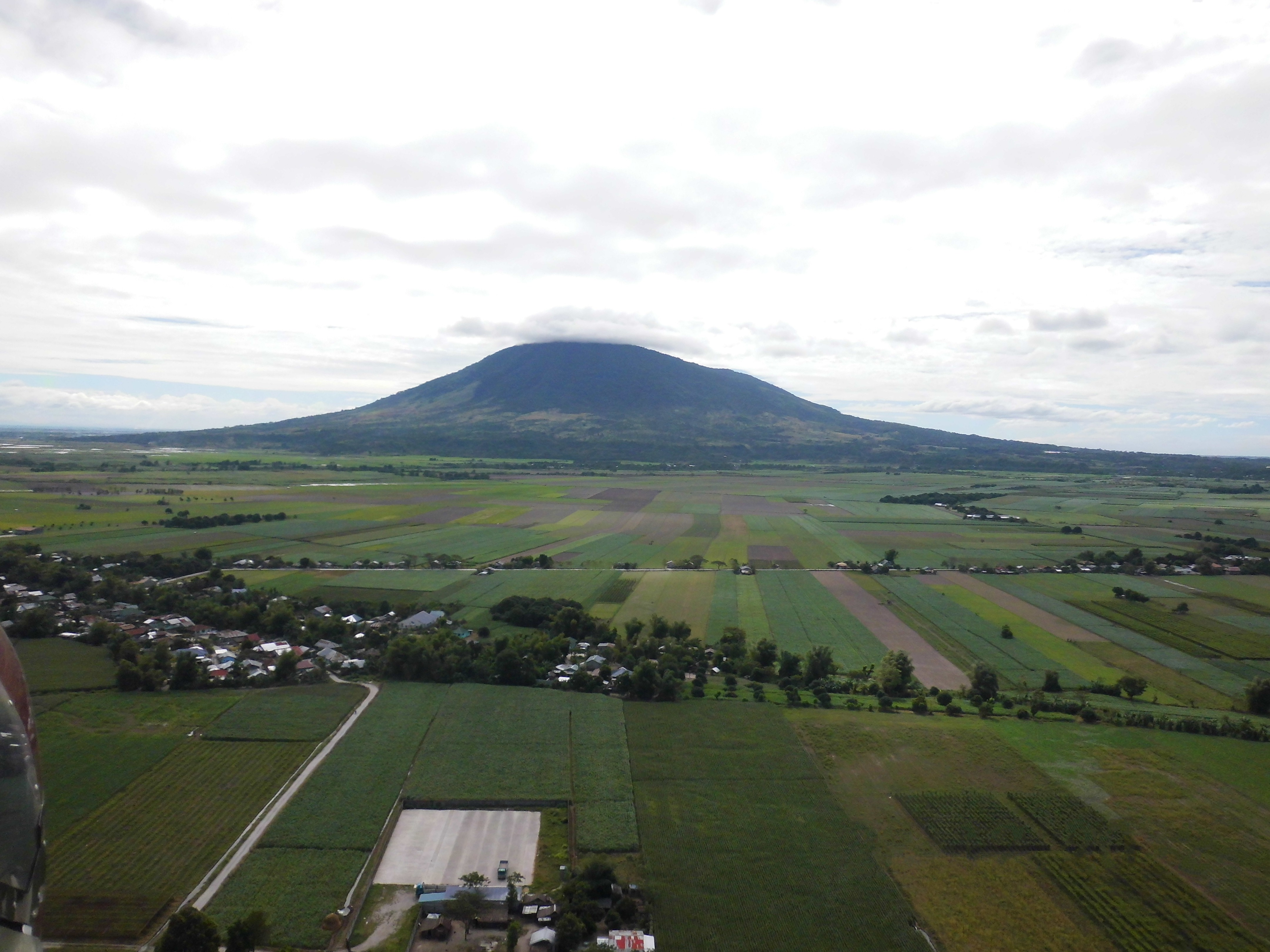
View to Mt. Arayat from NNW: distance ≈ 8 km, (flight) altitude ≈ 120m

Mount Arayat is said to be the home of the god/sorcerer named Sinukuan/Sinukwan or Sucu, which could mean "The end" or "he to whom others have surrendered." The mountain was said to have been located in the swamp to its south but relocated because of the evil ways of those who lived there, in addition to which, the people of the swamp were made to suffer numerous misfortunes. Sinukuan is believed to be able to transform and do as he pleases at will, his only real rival being Namalyari of Mount Pinatubo. The waterfalls at Ayala in Magalang, Pampanga is said to be his bathing area, and it is often visited by tourists and natives alike. Sinukuan is said to live at the White Rock, a lava dome possibly formed by the last eruption, where its glimmering properties were most likely to have inspired the legend. Contrary to reality, the mountain is believed to be several mountains merging at the center including the tallest two peaks. Sinukuan is believed to have daughters who come down only during times of grace and are disguised as humans, as Sinukuan himself can do. The day he returns is believed to either in response to the attack of Namalyari during the 1991 eruption of Mount Pinatubo, or when he shall call his servants at the end of the world.

Prior to Spanish colonization, the resident mountain deity was the powerful male Kapampangan god, Aring Sinukûan, who was at par with the Kapampangan god of Pinatubo, Apûng Malyari. The two were the second most powerful deities in Kapampangan mythology, next only to Mangechay (sometimes called Mangacha), the great elder and creator goddess. Aring Sinukûan was the solar deity of war and death, having taught early humans metallurgy, woodcutting, rice agriculture, and warfare. He had three children: Munag Sumalâ, a golden serpent god representing the dawn; Lakandanup, the god of gluttony who represented the sun at noon; and Gatpanapun, the noble god who only knew pleasure and represented the afternoon. His consort is Mingan, while he also had a winged assistant named Galurâ, a giant divine eagle believed to be bring storms. However, when the Spanish arrived, they recast Sinukuan as a woman, thinking people would not revere the deity if he was a female without knowing the supreme deity of the Kapampangans was creator goddess Mangechay. Despite this, natives continued to revere Sinukuan, so the Spanish added “María” to Christianise the figure in subjugating the natives and converting them into Roman Catholicism. In recent years, locals have claimed sightings of a man on the mountain, angry due to the ongoing deforestation; some identified the man as Aring Sinukuan.

== Listings ==
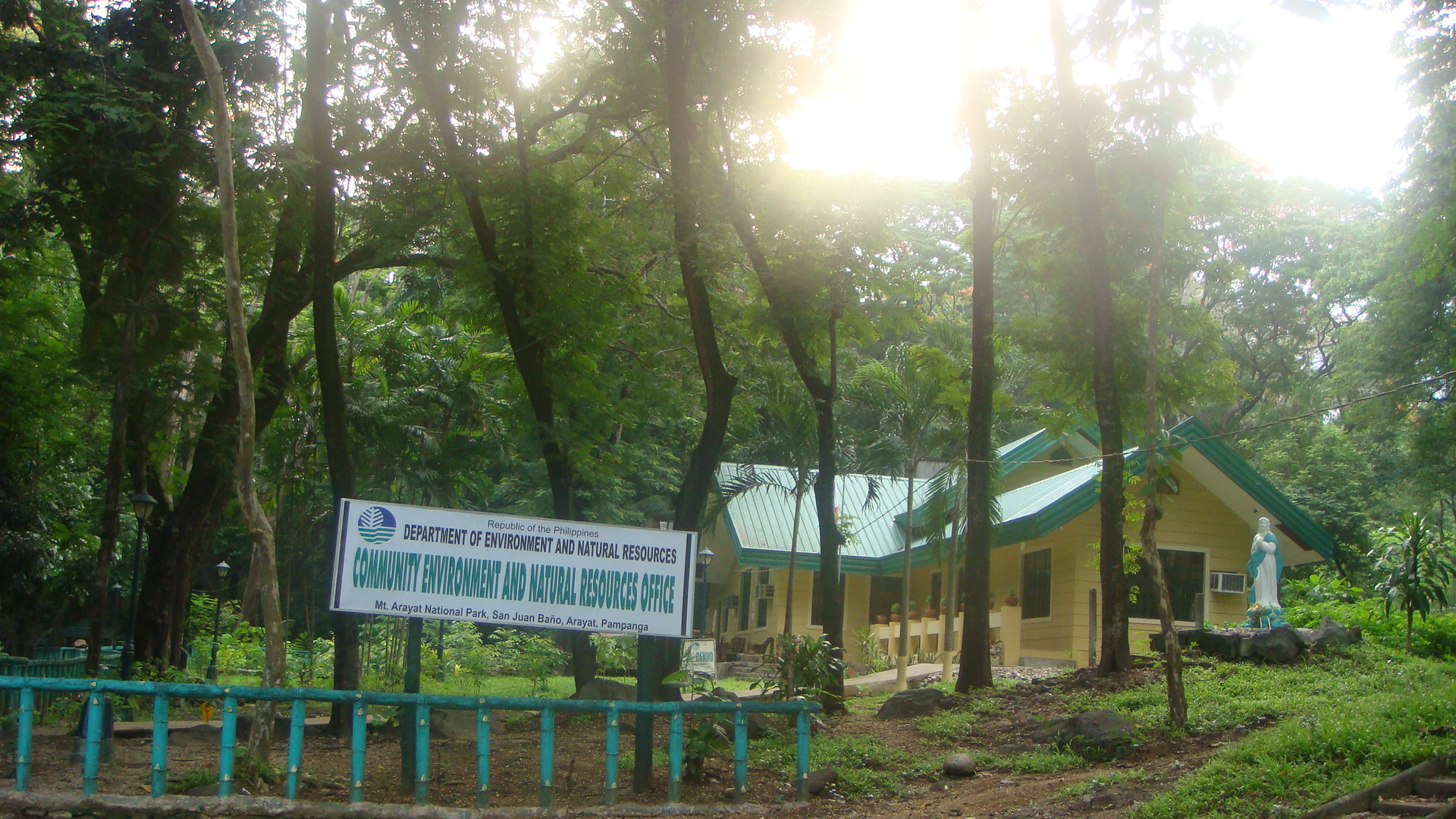
DENR CENRO office within Mount Arayat National Park

Fumarole activity is reported on the NW side of the summit.

The Global Volcanism Program lists Mount Arayat as Holocene.

The Philippine Institute of Volcanology and Seismology (PHIVOLCS) lists Mount Arayat as an inactive volcano.

== Conservation efforts ==
In April 2022, President Rodrigo Duterte signed a law declaring Mount Arayat as a protected landscape under the National Integrated Protected Areas System.

== See also ==
- List of active volcanoes in the Philippines
- List of potentially active volcanoes in the Philippines
- List of inactive volcanoes in the Philippines
- List of national parks of the Philippines
- Pacific ring of fire
- Philippine Institute of Volcanology and Seismology
