= HHI =

HHI may refer to:

- Fraunhofer Institute for Telecommunications (also Fraunhofer Heinrich Hertz Institute), an organization of the Fraunhofer Society based in Berlin
- Hamburg International (ICAO code: HHI), an independent passenger airline based in Hamburg-Nord, Hamburg, Germany
- Henry Henderson Institute, an educational establishment in Blantyre, Malawi
- Herfindahl–Hirschman index, a measure of the size of firms in relation to the industry they are in
- Hildesheim Hauptbahnhof (DS100 code: HHI), the main railway station for the city of Hildesheim in Lower Saxony, Germany
- Hillcrest Heights Institute, a private school located in the barangay of San Francisco, Magalang, Pampanga
- Hoia Hoia language (ISO 639-3 code: hhi), a Papuan language of Papua New Guinea
- Hopewell Highway Infrastructure, the highway unit of Hong Kong-listed conglomerate Hopewell Holdings Ltd
- Hyundai Heavy Industries, the world's largest shipbuilding company
- Wheeler Army Airfield (IATA code: HHI), a United States Army post located on O'ahu
