= Magalang =

Municipality in Pampanga, Philippines

- Municipality
- Municipality of Magalang
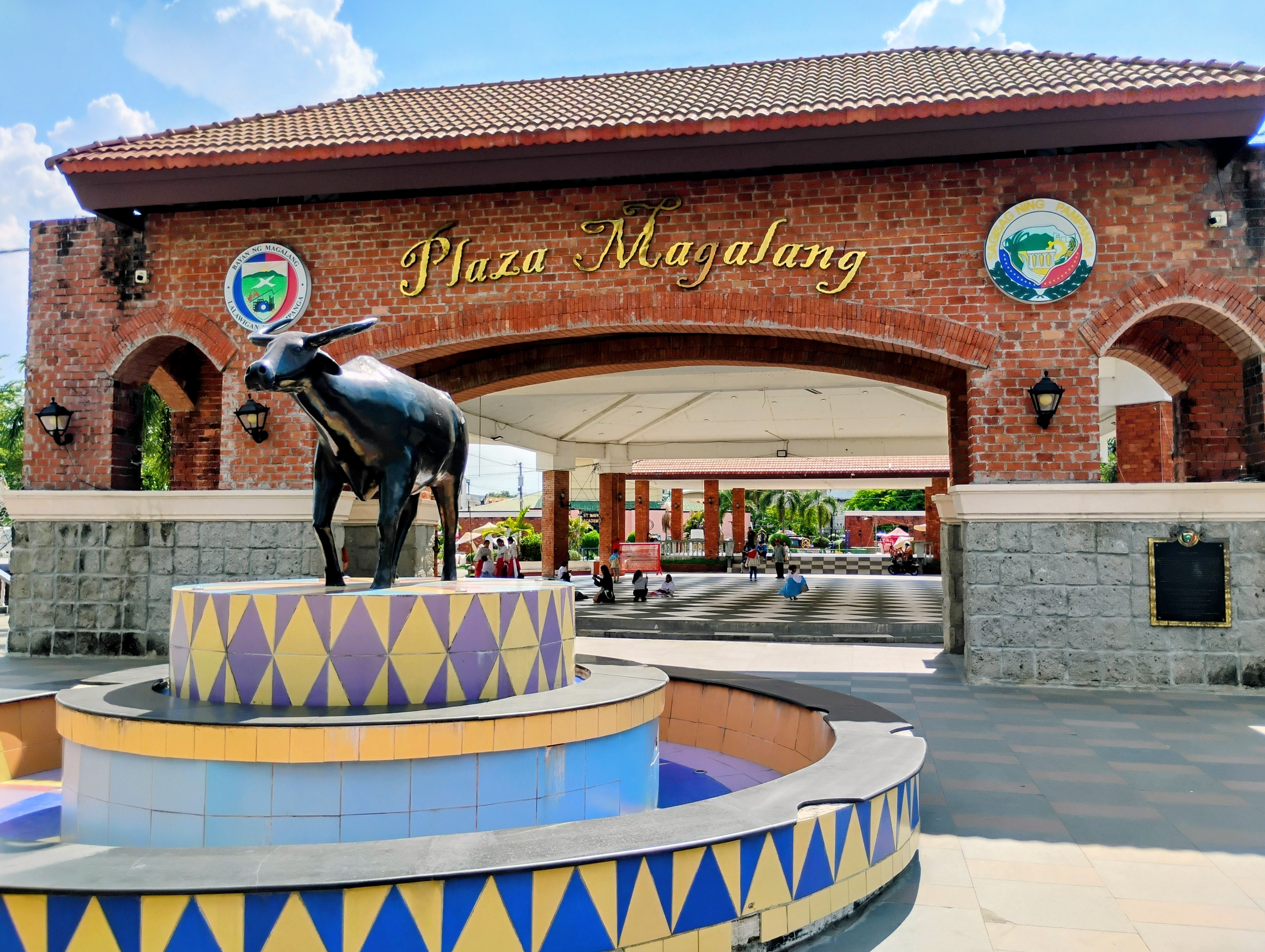
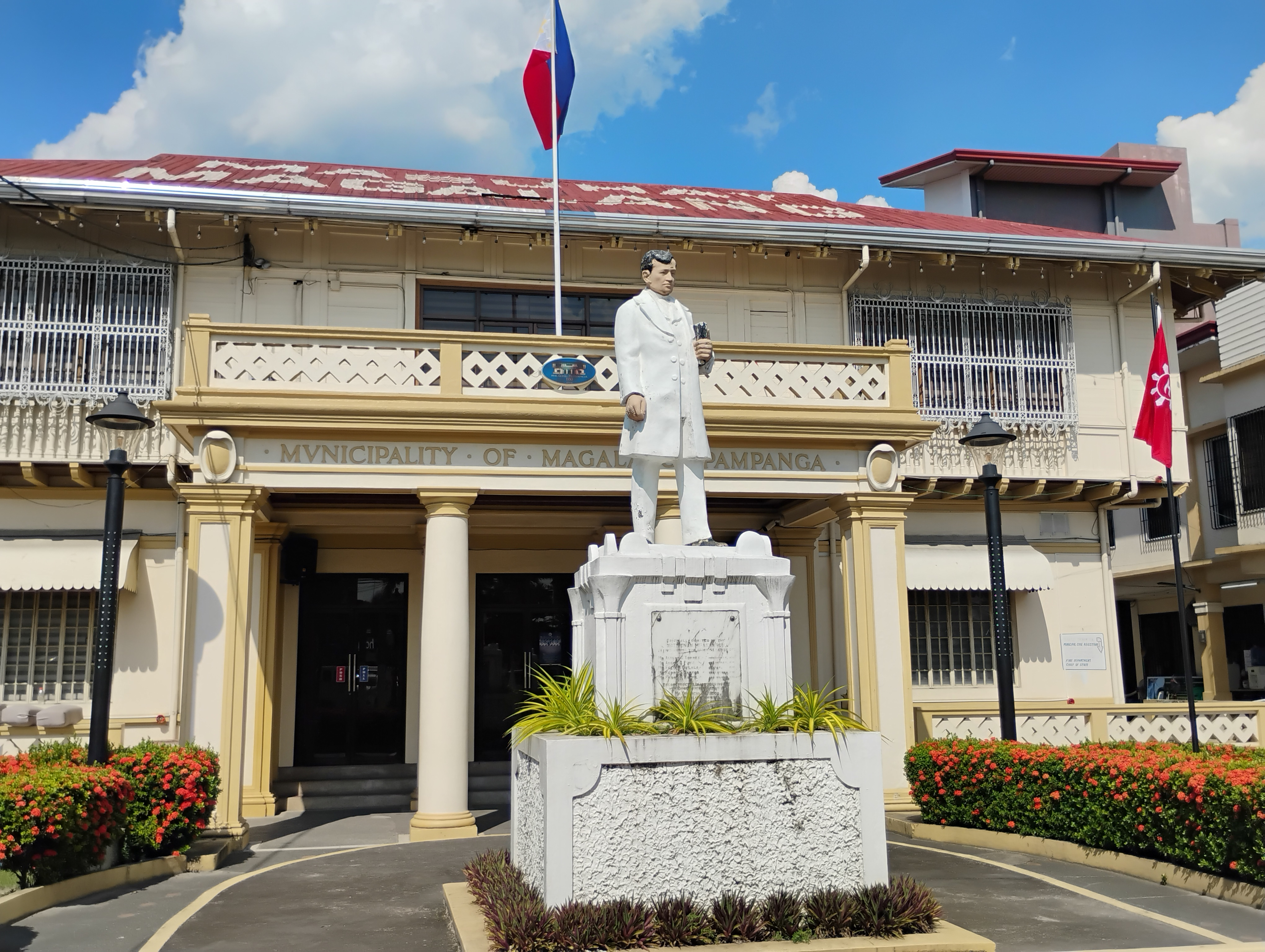
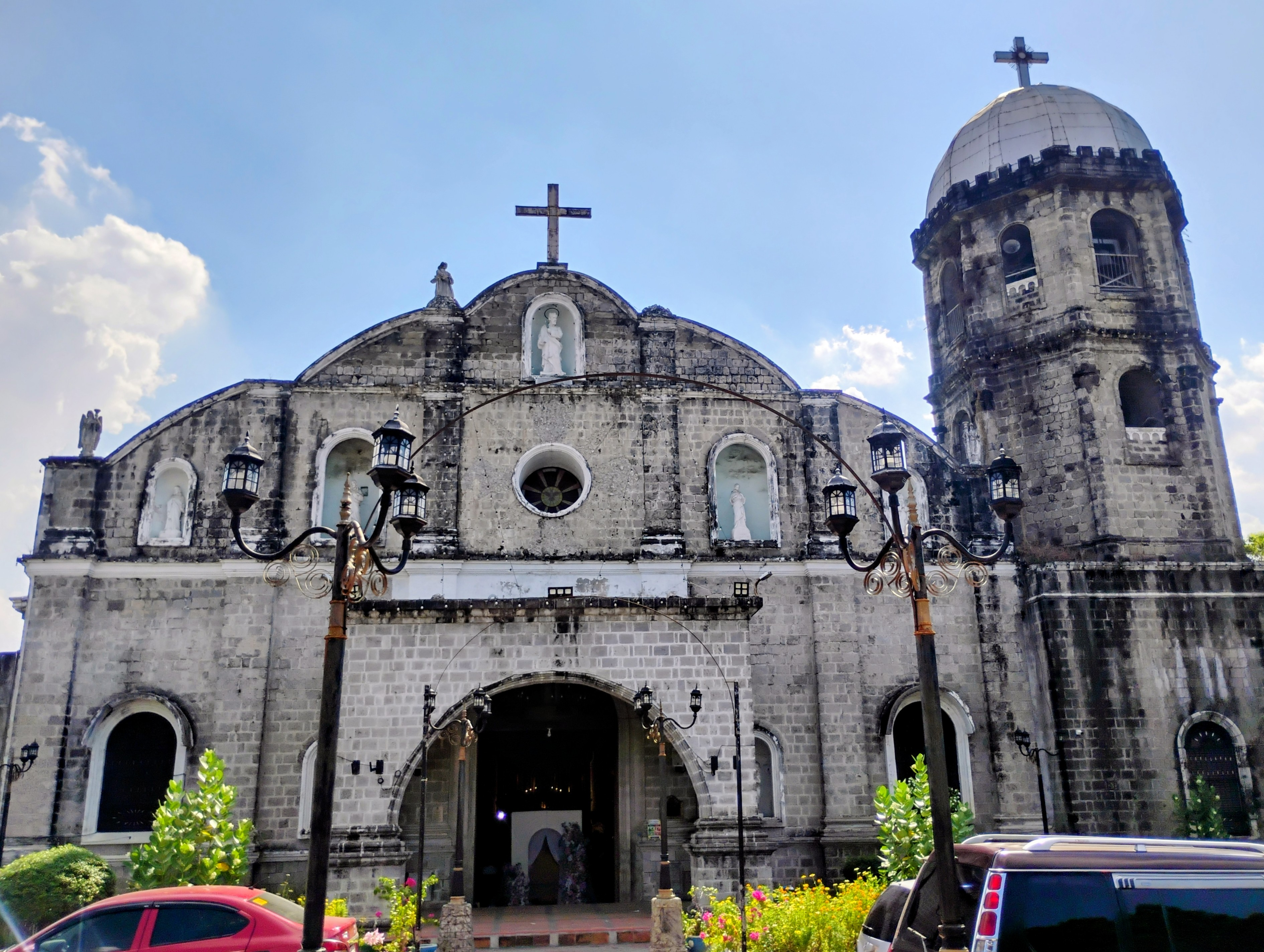
- Plaza Magalang Magalang Municipal Hall Saint Bartholomew Parish Church

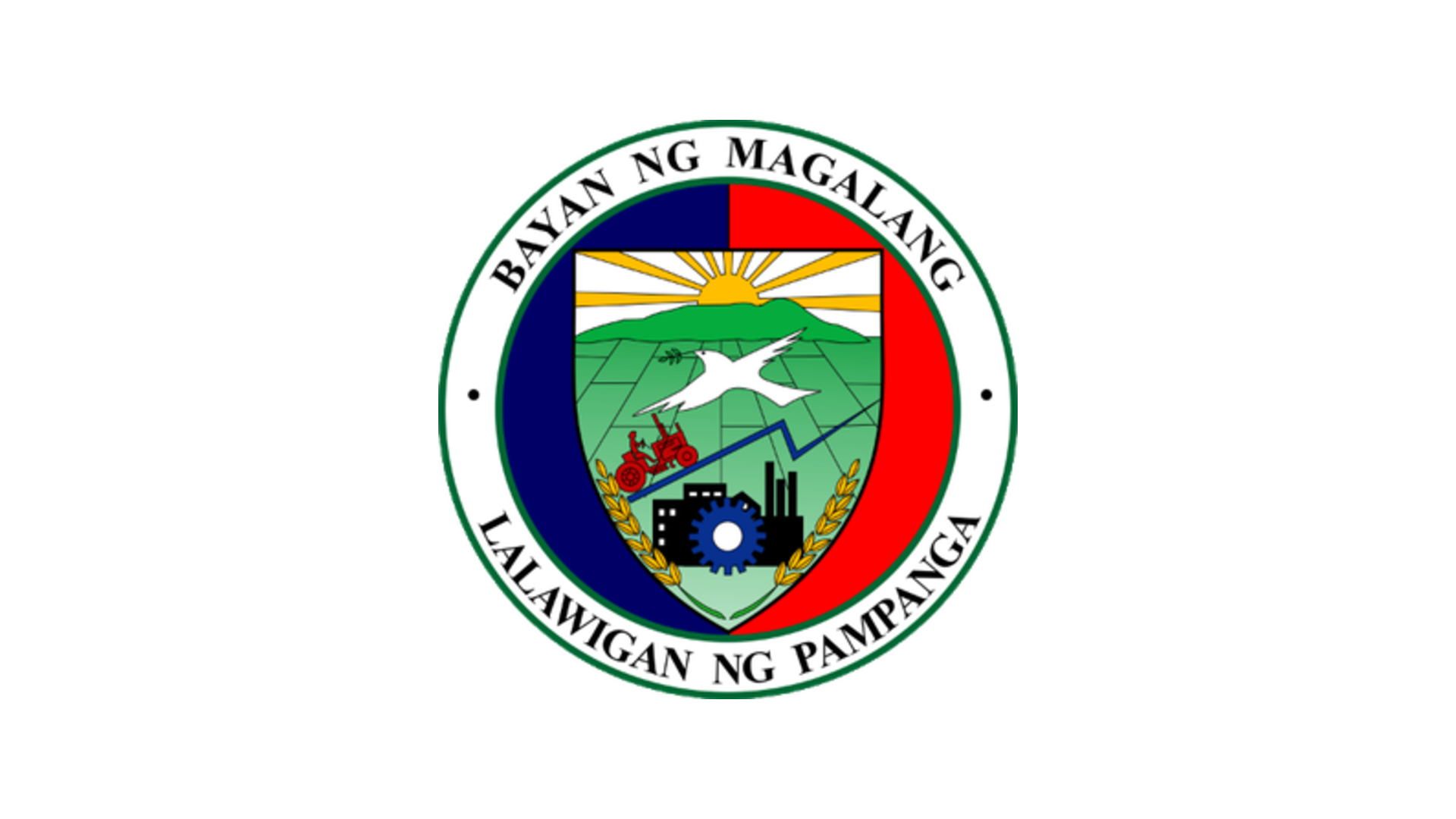
- Flag Seal
- Nickname: Sweet Tamarind Capital of The Philippines
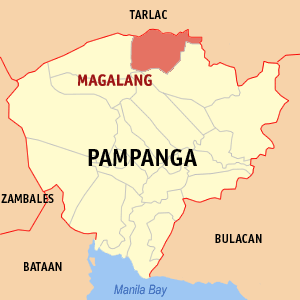
- Map of Pampanga with Magalang highlighted
- Interactive map of Magalang
- Location within the Philippines
- Coordinates: 15°12′50″N 120°39′43″E
- Country: Philippines
- Region: Central Luzon
- Province: Pampanga
- District: 1st district
- Founded: April 30, 1605
- Barangays: 27 (see Barangays)

Government
  - Type: Sangguniang Bayan
  - Mayor: Maria Lourdes P. Lacson
  - Vice Mayor: Eller V. Pecson
  - Representative: Carmelo G. Lazatin Jr.
  - Councilors: List: June Tanglao; JD Cruz; Koko Gonzales; Junnel Malonzo; Prince Baluyut; Nelson Dizon; Noel Sunga; Niko Gonzales
  - Electorate: 82,452 voters (2025)

Area
  - Total: 97.32 km^{2} (37.58 sq mi)
- Elevation: 48 m (157 ft)
- Highest elevation: 147 m (482 ft)
- Lowest elevation: 22 m (72 ft)

Population (2024 census)
  - Total: 133,883
  - Density: 1,376/km^{2} (3,563/sq mi)
  - Households: 28,072

Economy
  - Income class: 1st municipal income class
  - Poverty incidence: 9.48% (2023)
  - Revenue: ₱ 489.4 million (2024)
  - Assets: ₱ 584.9 million (2024)
  - Expenditure: ₱ 483.8 million (2024)
  - Liabilities: ₱ 147.2 million (2024)

Service provider
  - Electricity: Pampanga 1 Electric Cooperative (PELCO 1)
- Time zone: UTC+8 (PST)
- ZIP code: 2011
- PSGC: 0305411000
- IDD : area code: +63 (0)45
- Native languages: Kapampangan; Tagalog
- Catholic diocese: Archdiocese of San Fernando

Magalang, officially the Municipality of Magalang (Kapampangan: Balen ning Magalang; Tagalog: Bayan ng Magalang), is a municipality in the province of Pampanga, Philippines. According to the 2024 census, it has a population of 133,883 people.

== History ==
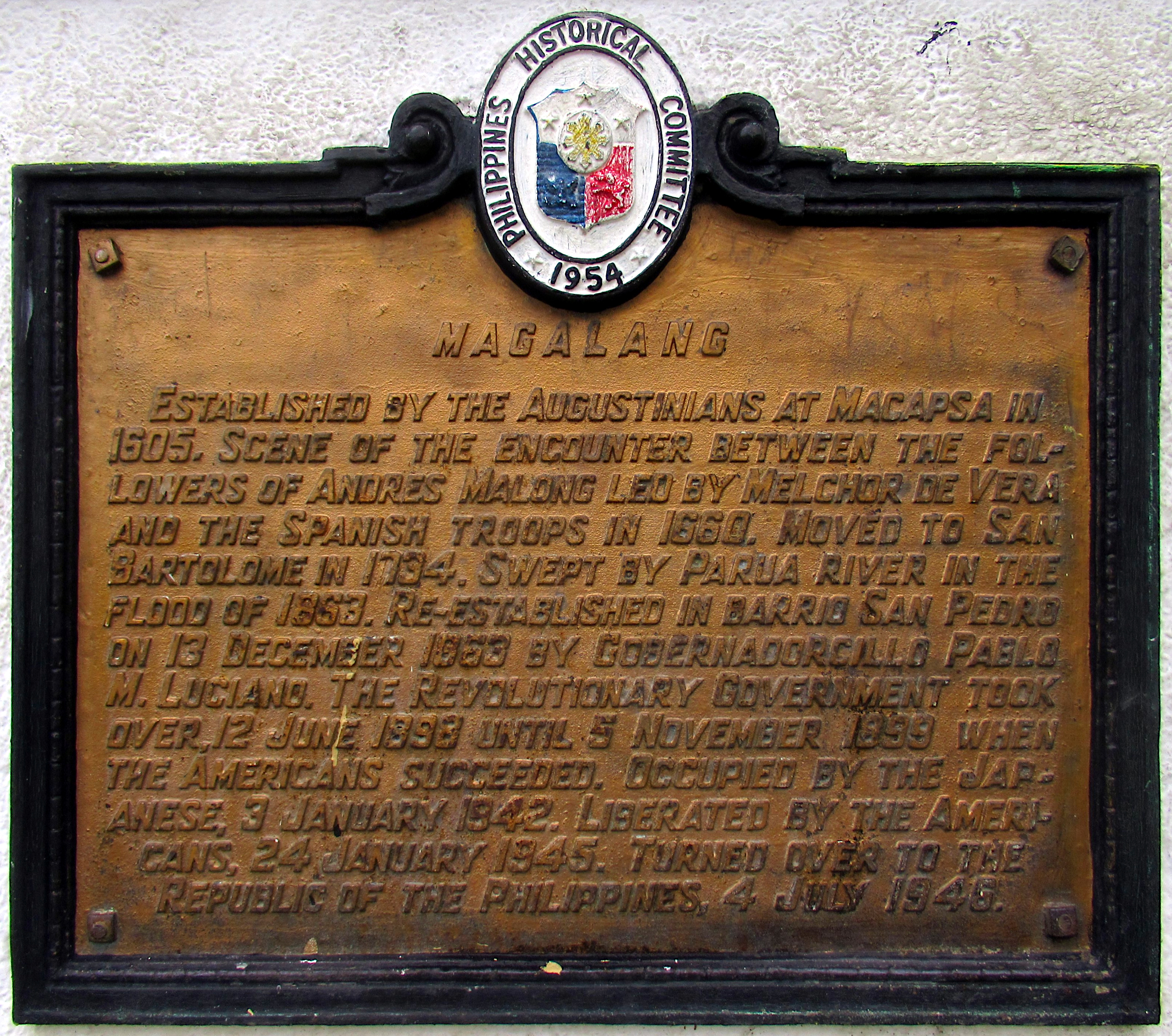
National historical marker installed in 1954 at the town plaza

Magalang was mentioned as a visita of the nearby town of Arayat on December 29, 1598. On April 30, 1605, it was separated by the Augustinians from Arayat and attained township status due to the bajo de la campana system. The Augustinians appointed Fr. Gonzalo de Salazar, OSA as the first pastor.

Magalang was initially called Magalo, derived from the Kapampangan word "Galo", which means wavy and moving, describing the dangerous flow of the Parua River.

Magalang was where Juan Severino Mallari, the first recorded Filipino serial killer who killed at least 57 people, served as the town's parish priest from 1816 to 1826 and committed his murders.

The town proper was located in Macapsa, but due to the natural calamities and revolts led by Andres Malong and his subordinate Melchor de Vera against the Spanish in 1660, it was nearly abandoned. It was moved to San Bartolome in 1734 until it was swept by the flood due to the overflow of the Parua River in 1863. It was transferred to the present site in barrio San Pedro Talimunduc on December 13, 1863, led by the parish priest, Fr. Ignacio Manzanares, OSA and some of the members of principalia including Pablo M. Luciano, gobernadorcillo of Magalang at that time.

In 1885, the agricultural experiment station La Granja Modelo de Luzon was transferred from San Isidro, Nueva Ecija to the foothills of Mount Arayat, which became the present Pampanga State Agricultural University.

The revolutionary government took over the local government on June 12, 1898, led by General Francisco Macabulos and Colonel Lorenzo D. Camaya. During that time, Magalang was one of the revolutionary centers in Pampanga due to its proximity to Camansi, a revolutionary headquarters located in Mount Arayat. The forces of Major General Servillano Aquino defended Magalang against the Americans until it was successfully captured on November 5, 1899, led by Major General Arthur MacArthur and Colonel Jacob H. Smith.

During the Second World War, Japanese forces defeated the Filipino-American forces composed of Igorot troops led by Major Helmert Duisterhof and Capt. Russell W. Volckmann, paving the way for the capture of Magalang on January 1, 1942. It was liberated by the 148th Infantry of 37th Division, US Army with the help of Hukbalahap on January 25, 1945. It was one of the hotbeds of the Hukbalahap insurgency until the rebellion was crushed in 1954.

On December 28, 1963, Mayor Benedicto T. Dayrit was assassinated by the alleged men of Commander Sumulong during a night ball in the town plaza. In 1968, Mayor Daniel T. Lacson was sworn in as mayor of Magalang until his term ended in 1986.

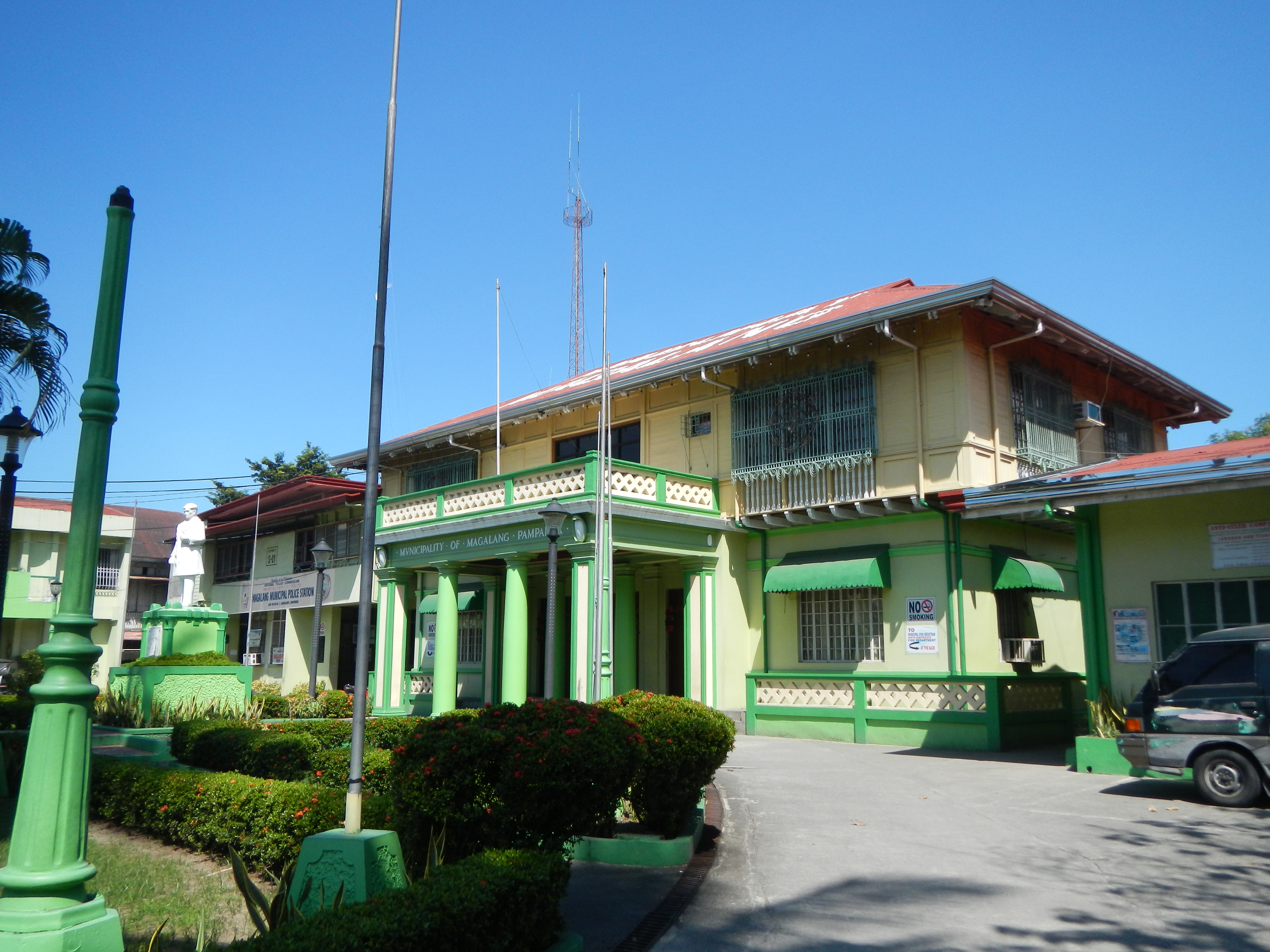
Magalang Municipal Hall

In December 1993, Mayor Daniel Lacson Jr. was briefly replaced by his political rival Elpidio Lakandula when the latter was declared the victor in the 1992 election by the Angeles City Regional Trial Court on December 28, which was immediately met with protests by Lacson and his followers.

During the tenure of Mayor Pastor Z. Guiao, Magalang was named one of the cleanest municipalities in the Philippines. Mayor Maria Lourdes P. Lacson was sworn in on June 30, 2016, as the first woman mayor of Magalang.

The National Museum of the Philippines declared on December 23, 2015, the "Magalang Municipal Hall" as an Important Cultural Property (Philippines).

=== Heliograph Towers ===
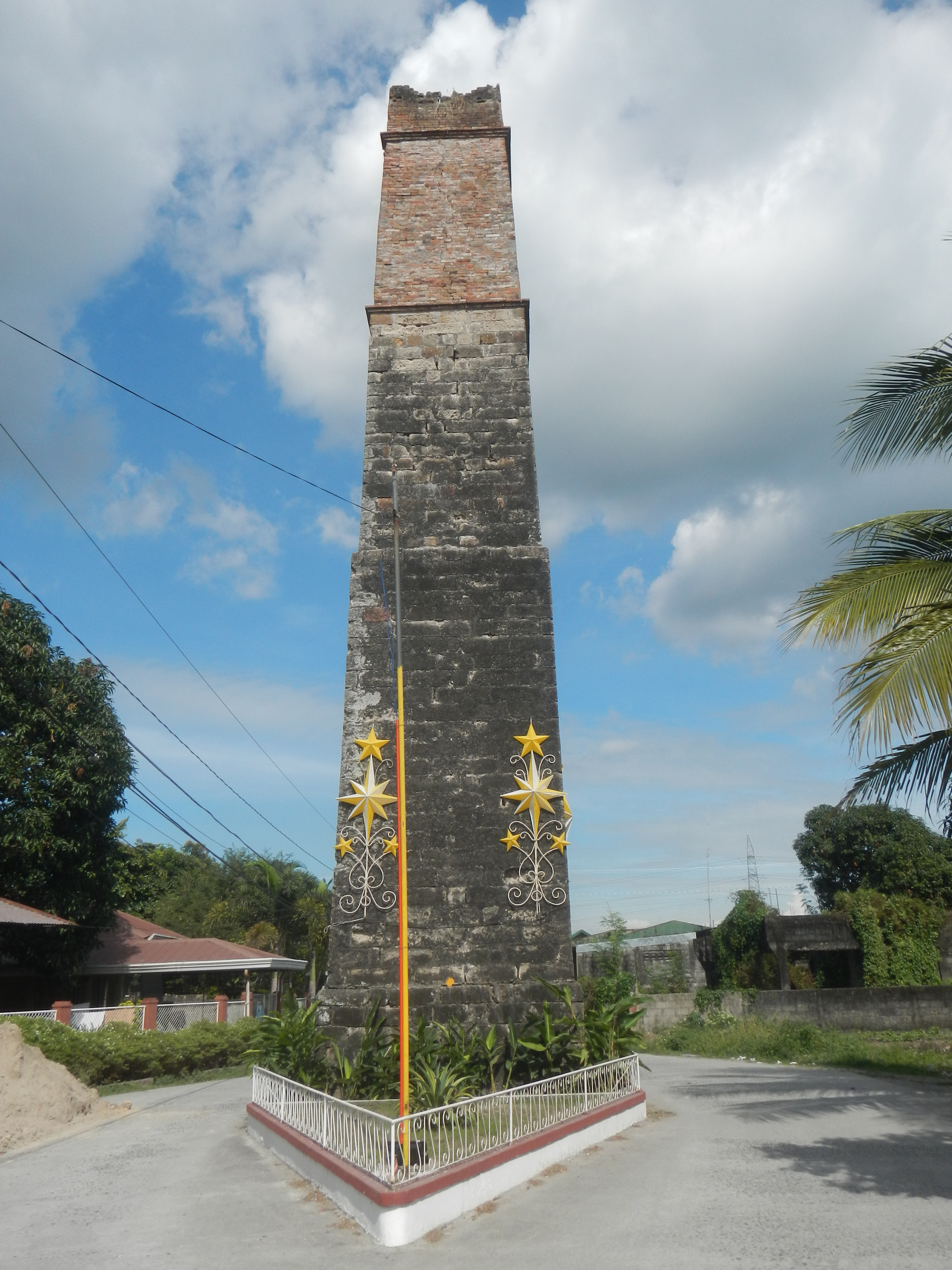
One of the Magalang Heliograph Towers

On August 21, 2017, the “Heliograph Towers” inside the premises of Cariyana Monastery in Barangays San Isidro and Santa Cruz were declared as Important Cultural Property (Philippines) of the National Museum of the Philippines per Resolution 14-2016. They were officially turned over by the National Museum of the Philippines to the local government unit on May 27, 2021. The "Torre" was called "imburnal", “bornal” or “batiawan” as smoke outlets for “cabiawan” or trapiche of early carabao-driven sugar mills. These solar-sun telegraphs are made of fine laryu (red bricks) and huge cut stones of pumiceous rocks and volcanic tuff. They were used as “sun writers” (mirrored communications devices for sending messages in Morse code by flashing the reflected sun's rays to a distant station).

The 1896 description states: “An instrument called the heliograph, or sun telegraph, constructed with small mirrors made to turn upon both a horizontal and vertical axis, mounted upon a tripod, so arranged as to make the flashes appear and disappear in rapid succession, is to a limited extent in use in the army; and by it, messages may be transmitted much faster than with flags or torches, and it can be used at longer ranges. It is manipulated by a key similar to the electric telegraph instrument. Mirror signaling was first used by the North American Indians.”

Erected by General Don Ricardo Monet y Carretero, a Commandant of War in 1863, the towers were used by the Spanish army as stations of communication for faster transmission of messages and signals and to destroy the revolutionary forces in Camansi in Mount Arayat led by General Francisco Macabulos. In a letter dated May 8, 1898, Monet informed the Comandancia General del Centro de Luzon of the destruction of activities of the detachment of Camansi located at Mount Arayat, transforming it into a blockhouse constructed at Magalang with some torre heliografico located in the 10 towns of Magalang and Concepcion, Tarlac with a height of 20 meters and made under the charge of the Engineering Corps. Originally, three "batiauan" or watchtowers were built but only two existed (Santa Cruz and San Isidro) and were also used to watch the coming of the enemies. Later the towers once produced muscovado sugar and panotsa.

== Geography ==
Magalang is 41 kilometres (25 mi) from San Fernando and 107 kilometres (66 mi) from Manila.

=== Barangays ===
Magalang is politically subdivided into 27 barangays, as shown below. Each barangay consists of puroks and some have sitios.

- Ayala
- Bucanan
- Camias
- Dolores
- Escaler
- La Paz
- Navaling
- San Agustin
- San Antonio
- San Francisco
- San Ildefonso
- San Isidro
- San Jose
- San Miguel
- San Nicolas I
- San Nicolas II (Concepcion)
- San Pablo
- San Pedro I
- San Pedro II
- San Roque
- San Vicente
- Santa Cruz
- Santa Lucia
- Santa Maria
- Santo Nino
- Santo Rosario
- Turu

=== Climate ===
Climate data for Magalang, Pampanga
Month	Jan	Feb	Mar	Apr	May	Jun	Jul	Aug	Sep	Oct	Nov	Dec	Year
Mean daily maximum °C (°F)	30 (86)	31 (88)	32 (90)	34 (93)	33 (91)	31 (88)	31 (88)	29 (84)	29 (84)	30 (86)	30 (86)	29 (84)	31 (87)
Mean daily minimum °C (°F)	19 (66)	19 (66)	20 (68)	22 (72)	24 (75)	24 (75)	24 (75)	24 (75)	24 (75)	22 (72)	21 (70)	20 (68)	22 (71)
Average precipitation mm (inches)	5 (0.2)	5 (0.2)	10 (0.4)	23 (0.9)	136 (5.4)	191 (7.5)	245 (9.6)	241 (9.5)	200 (7.9)	108 (4.3)	36 (1.4)	12 (0.5)	1,212 (47.8)
Average rainy days	2.6	2.5	4.4	8.3	20.9	24.4	27.4	26.9	25.0	18.2	9.2	3.6	173.4
Source: Meteoblue

== Demographics ==
Population census of Magalang

Year	Pop.	±% p.a.
1903	8,516	—
1918	9,780	+0.93%
1939	16,634	+2.56%
1948	13,049	−2.66%
1960	18,626	+3.01%
1970	26,342	+3.52%
1975	31,462	+3.63%
1980	34,840	+2.06%

Year	Pop.	±% p.a.
1990	43,940	+2.35%
1995	52,607	+3.43%
2000	77,530	+8.67%
2007	98,595	+3.37%
2010	103,597	+1.82%
2015	113,147	+1.69%
2020	124,188	+1.98%
2024	133,883	+1.82%

Source: Philippine Statistics Authority

In the 2024 census, the population of Magalang was 133,883 people, with a density of 1,400 inhabitants per square kilometre or 3,600 inhabitants per square mile.

== Religion ==
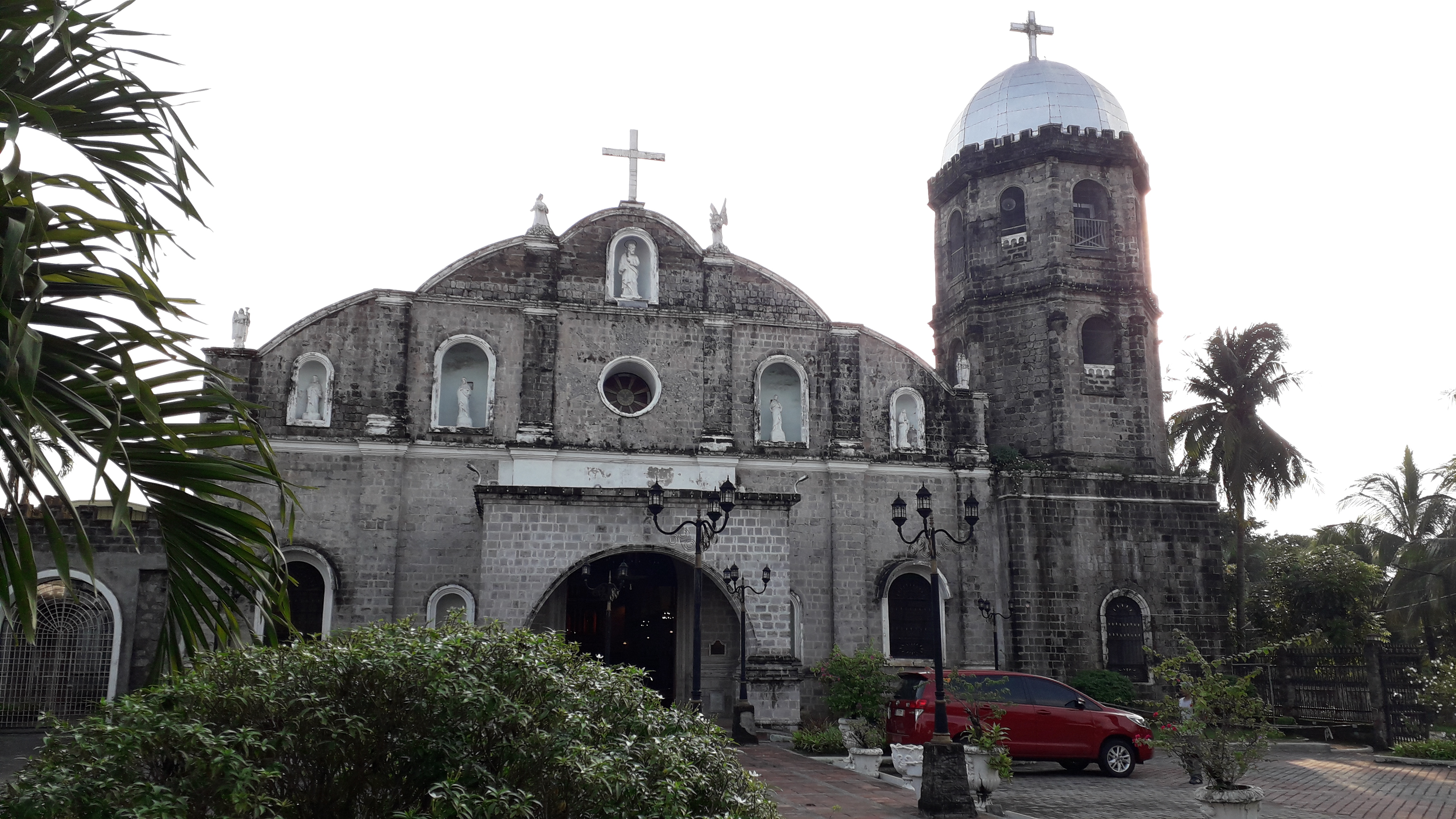
Façade of San Bartolome Parish Church

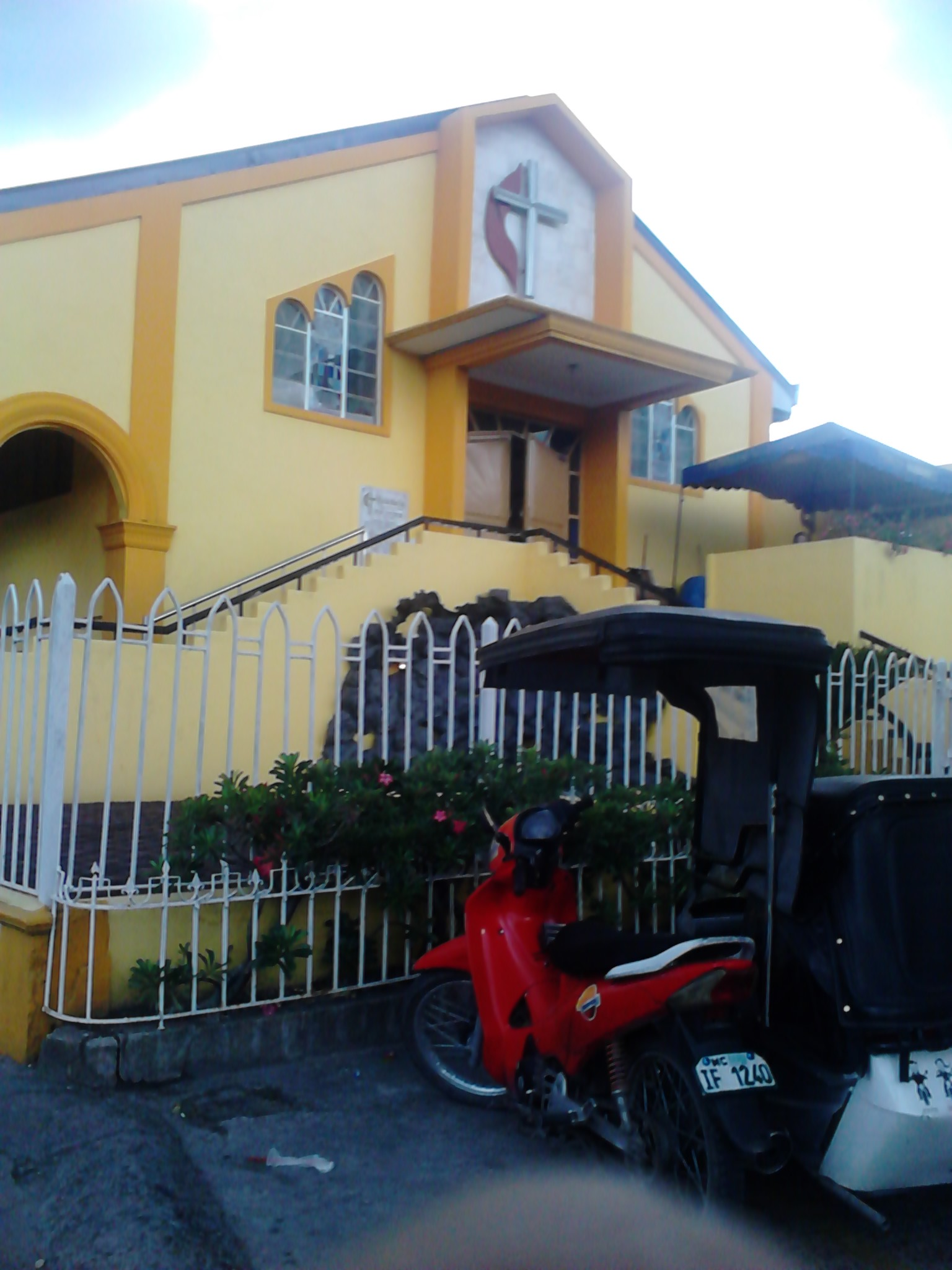
United Methodist Church in Magalang

Roman Catholics account for 85% of the population; Magalang also hosts churches of Members Church of God International or Ang Dating Daan. Other major religious groups are Iglesia ni Cristo which has the adherence of 3% of the population, Evangelical Christians and others.

Aside from Catholic churches, the town has a United Methodist Church. In 1908, Protestantism was introduced and Vicente Naguit was the first convert.

=== San Bartolome Parish Church ===
St. Bartholomew Parish Church (Roman Catholic Archdiocese of San Fernando, Vicariate of St. John the Beloved) was established by the Augustinians on April 30, 1605. The present edifice was constructed in 1866 by Fr. Ramon Sarrionandia, OSA. The 3-aisle church is made of stone and wood. It is 55m. long, 21m. wide and 7m. high. Interplay of arches, as seen on the main entrance, doors and niches, pediments and fenestrations, including those of the belltowers and adjacent convent suggest a touch of baroque.

=== San Agustin Chapel ===
This chapel located in Dapa, San Agustin, Magalang; where the miraculous image of San Agustin is enshrined. During Spanish period, the image was believed to be carved out by a bandit nearby Mt. Arayat. The small image of San Agustin was brought to Dapa, and there, the small image gradually become larger and miraculous. The image itself cured many diseases and granting child, for those couples who are childless. The chapel is open during Fridays and Holy Week.

=== San Padre Pio Pietralcina Chapel ===
This chapel is located in sitio Mabato-Bato in San Francisco, Magalang. A first class relic composed of hair particles of St. Padre Pio Pietrelcina was enshrined in this chapel in 2017. Devotees of Padre Pio came to this chapel to paid visit, seek his intercession to their different personal intentions. The chapel is open during Thursdays, 8:00am to 7:00pm. A holy mass is to be offer during third Thursday of the month; and the veneration of the relic is followed after the mass.

=== Lord's Epiphany Parish ===
This parish church located in Angeles-Magalang Road, San Francisco, Magalang was established in 1996. A first class relic of St. Francis of Assisi composed of a piece of bone and his staff, was enshrined in the church in 2016. The veneration of the relic is open during Tuesdays. A holy mass is to be offer in that same day in 6:00pm. After the holy mass, the veneration of the relic and anointing of St. Francis' oil is held after the mass.

=== Sta Clara de Assisi Chapel ===
This chapel is located in sitio Tambacan in San Francisco, Magalang. The chapel, where the second class relic of Saint Claire of Assisi is enshrined. The relic is composed of small piece of veil used by the saint. The chapel is open during Thursdays.

=== Banal a Bunduk, Dalan ning Krus ===
This iconic site was born due to the efforts of Soroptimist International of Magalang. The site is located in sitio Orchard, barrio Ayala, Magalang; in the rolling foothills of Mt. Arayat. This site is composed of life sized images of 14 stations of the cross of Christ. It is favorite destination of pilgrims and devotees during Holy Week.

== Economy ==
Poverty incidence of Magalang (%)

Source: Philippine Statistics Authority

== Government ==
Magalang is part of the 1st Congressional District of Pampanga.

=== Local government ===
Like other towns in the Philippines, Magalang is governed by a mayor and vice mayor who are elected to three-year terms. The mayor is the executive head and leads the town's departments in executing the Sangguniang Bayan's ordinances and improving public services. The vice mayor heads a legislative council consisting of councilors, as members.

=== List of local chief executives ===
Gobernardorcillos

- Pablo M. Luciano (1863)
- Pablo Pineda (1864)
- Jose Calalang (1865)
- Emigdio Mendoza (1866)
- Santiago C. Suing (1867)
- Manuel S. Lacson (1868)
- Valentin L. Dayrit (1869-1871)
- Anacleto S. Lacson (1871-1873)
- Luis M. Magdangal (1873-1875)
- Tereso C. Manalo (1875-1877)
- Apolonio Lising (1877-1879)
- Abdon Supan (1879-1881)
- Pablo M. Luciano (1881-1882)
- Teopisto S. Ganzon (1882)
- Domingo E. David (1882-1883)
- Raymundo Sanchez (1883-1885)
- Santiago Angeles (1885-1887)
- Tomas R. Dizon (1887-1888)
- Domingo P. Tayag (1888)
- Paulino C. Gueco (1888-1889)
- Domingo H. Gantioqui (1889-1891)
- Aniceto S. Lacson (1891-1893)

Capitan Municipales (Regimen Maura)

- Manuel C. Gueco (1893-1895)
- Teopisto S. Ganzon (1895-1896)
- Paulino C. Gueco (1896-1898)

Revolucion

- Buenaventura C. Paras (1898)
- Ladislao C. Dayrit (1898-1899)

American Regime (Alcalde)

- Daniel O. Lacson (1899-1901)

Municipal Presidents

- Juan P. Feliciano (1901-1902)
- Tomas R. Dizon (1902-1903)
- Regino P. Gamboa (1903-1904)
- Manuel C. Gueco (1904-1905)
- Jose F. Luciano (1905-1907)
- Juan P. Feliciano (1907-1909)
- Dr. Andres J. Luciano (1909-1912)
- Irineo F. Dizon (1912-1913)
- Alfredo G. Ganzon (1913-1916)
- Pablo A. Luciano (1917-1923)
- Antonio Y. Luciano (1923-1925)
- Juan P. Feliciano (1925-1928)
- Atanacio M. Baluyut (1928-1931)
- Atty. Jose C. Morales (1931-1934)

Alcalde (Commonwealth Period)

- Dr. Servillano D. Ayuyao (1934-1937)
- Jose M. Navarro (1937-1940)

Alcalde (Japanese Government)

- Jose M. Navarro (1940-1943)
- Atty. Isidoro D. Ayuyao (1943-1945)

Alcalde (Liberation)

- Antonio P. Tiglao (1945-1947)

Mayors (Republic of the Philippines)

- Dr. Ricardo Tapnio (1947-1951)
- Enrique P. Baluyut (1952-1955)
- Orencio A. Gueco (1956-1959)
- Benedicto T. Dayrit (1960-1963)
- Rogelio O. Tiglao (1964-1965)
- Dr. Gregorio S. Liwanag (1966-1967)
- Daniel T. Lacson, Sr. (1968-1986)
- Pablo David (1986-1987)
- Daniel L. Lacson, Jr. (1988-1998)
- Lamberto M. Cruz (acting) (1998)
- Pastor Z. Guiao (1998-2007)
- Lyndon A. Cunanan (2007-2009)
- Romulo F. Pecson (2009-2016)
- Maria Lourdes P. Lacson (2016-2019)
- Romulo F. Pecson (2019-2022)
- Maria Lourdes P. Lacson (2022-)

== Infrastructure ==
=== Roads ===
- Magalang – Angeles Road – connecting Angeles City to Magalang
- Magalang - Mabalacat Road. – connecting Magalang to Mabalacat
- Magalang – Arayat – Santa Ana Road – connecting Magalang to Santa Ana, bypassing Arayat
- Magalang – Concepcion Provincial Road (Ninoy Aquino Highway) – provincial road from Magalang to Concepcion, Tarlac
- Don Luis Dizon Drive (also known As PAC Rd.) –connecting Magalang Poblacion - AMLHS and Pampanga State Agricultural University (PAC)

=== Health care ===
On January 10, 2012, Governor Lilia Pineda led the inauguration of the P35-million Andres Luciano District Hospital (ALDH) in Barangay San Pablo.

== Education ==
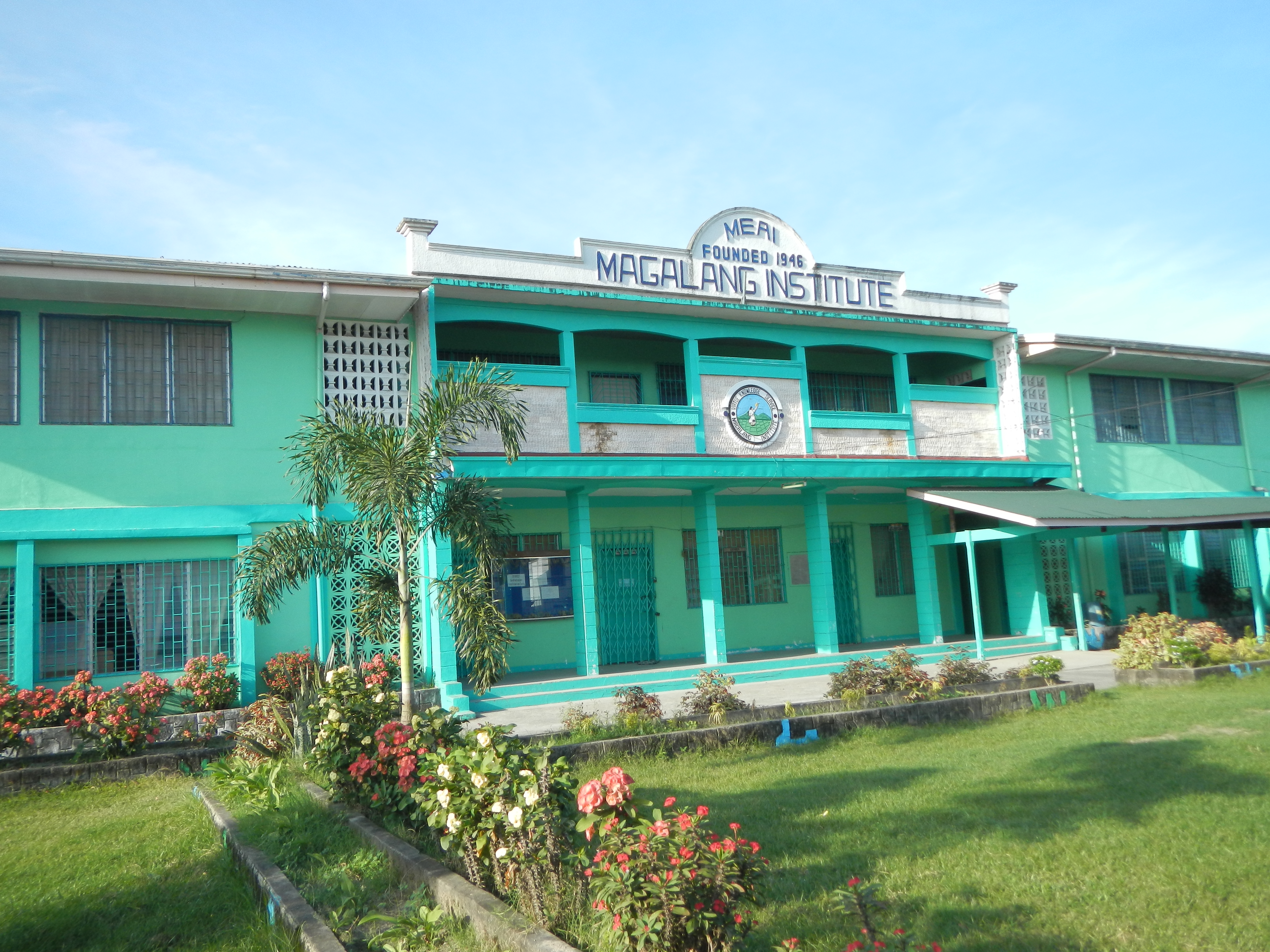
Magalang Institute

There are two schools district offices that govern all educational institutions within the municipality. They oversee the management and operations of all private and public, from primary to secondary schools. These are the Magalang North Schools District Office, and Magalang South Schools District Office.

=== Primary and elementary schools ===
- AYZ Little Saint's School
- Balitucan Elementary School
- Brighter Years Child Development Center
- Bucanan Elementary School
- Cabalantian Elementary School
- Christian Vision Academy Foundation
- Christian Vision Academy San Isidro (Annex)
- Escaler Elementary School
- Golden Vine Center for Childcare and Development
- Great Shepherd School
- Hillcrest Heights Institute
- Magalang Christian Ecumenical School
- Magalang Christian Ecumenical School (Santa Cruz)
- Magalang Elementary School (Magalang Central School)
- Magalang Institute
- Navaling Elementary School
- Orchard Elementary School
- San Agustin Elementary School
- San Francisco Elementary School
- San Miguel Elementary School
- San Pablo Elementary
- San Pedro 2 Elementary School
- San Roque Elementary School
- San Vicente Elementary School
- Santa Cruz Elementary School
- Santa Maria Elementary School
- Santo Nino Elementary School
- Santo Rosario Elementary School
- St. Bernice School
- St. Nathanael Academy
- True Light Foundation School
- Turu Elementary School
- Talimundoc Elementary School

=== Secondary schools ===
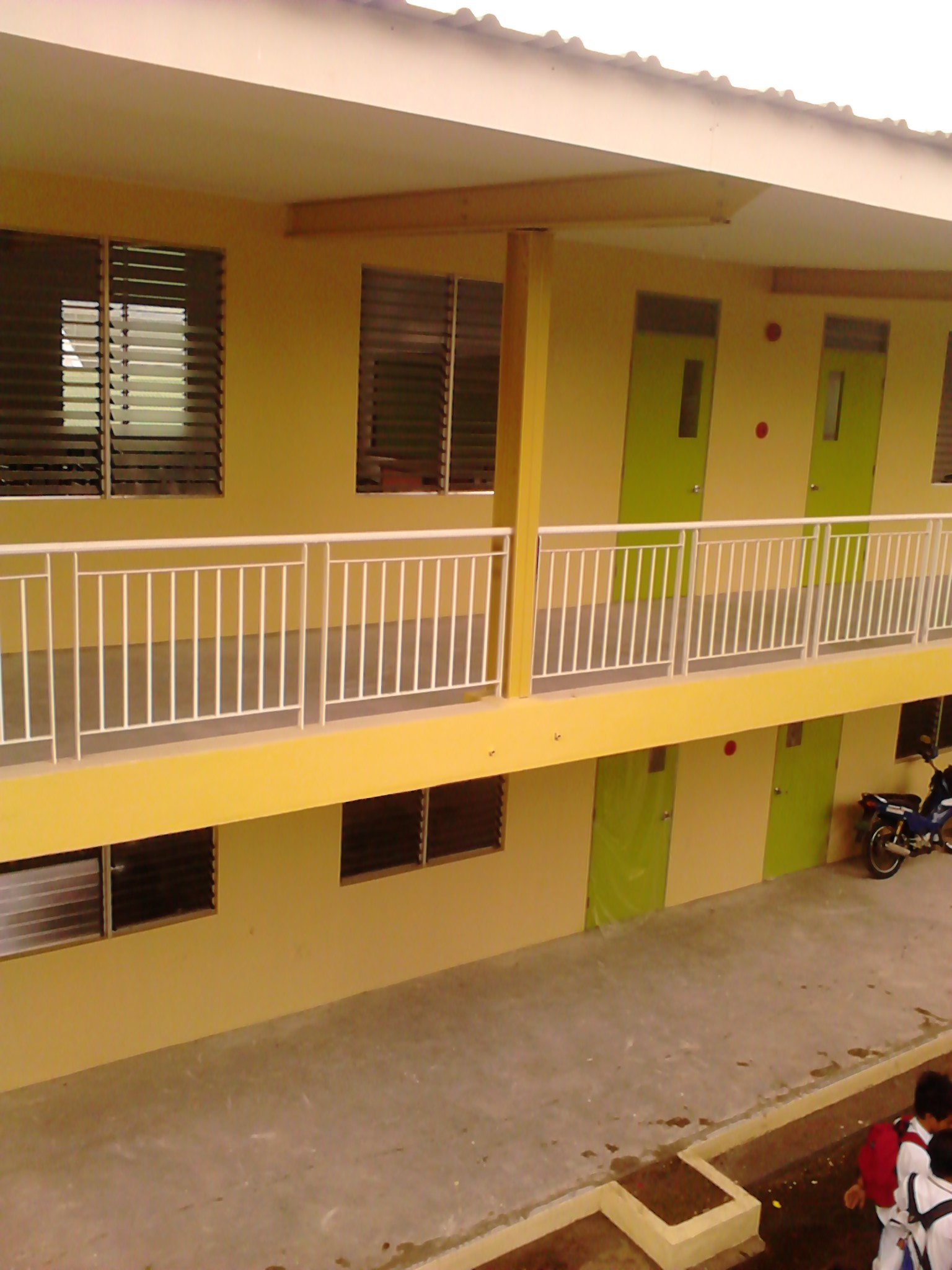
Andres M. Luciano High School

- Andres M. Luciano High School
- Ayala High School
- Balitucan National High School
- Dolores National High School
- Rodolfo V. Feliciano Memorial High School
- Tinajero National High School (Annex)

=== Higher educational institutions ===
- Pampanga State Agricultural University
- Far East College of Information and Technology

== Festivals and events ==
Date	Name
April 30	Magalang Foundation Day
August 24	Magalang Town Fiesta (Camaru Festival)
August 28	Feast of San Agustin
December 12	Banal a Batuin or Lubenas
December 13	Transfer Day

== Notable personalities ==
- Liza Lorena, actress
- Tonton Gutierrez, actor
- Mariel Rodriguez, actor
- Bren Guiao, politician
- Yeng Guiao, athlete and politician
- Vivencio Cuyugan, co-founder of the Hukbalahap
- Ed Ocampo, athlete
- Oscar V. Cruz, Roman Catholic prelate
- Norman Gonzales, athlete
- Emilio Aguilar Cruz, artist

== Gallery ==
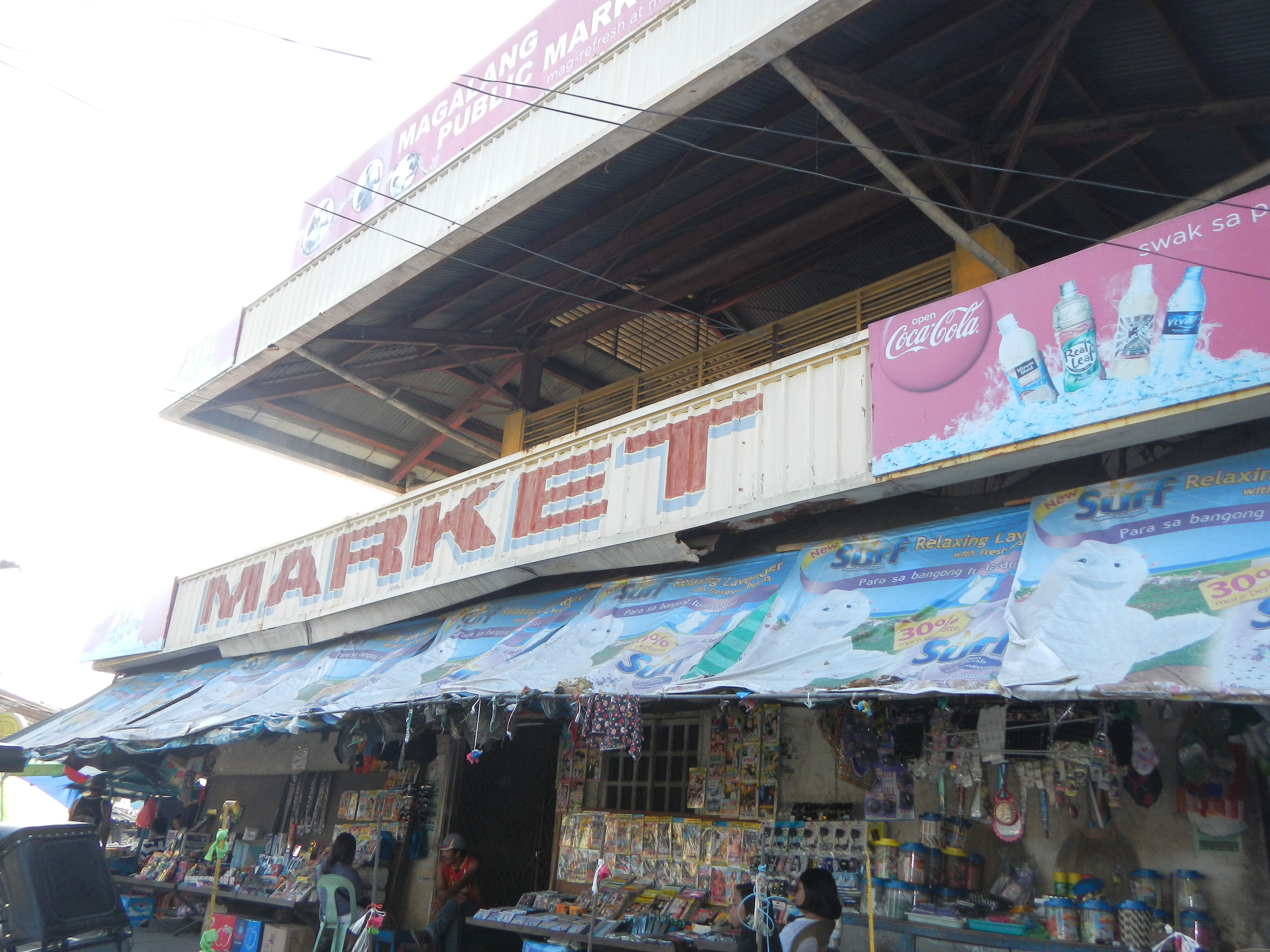
Public market

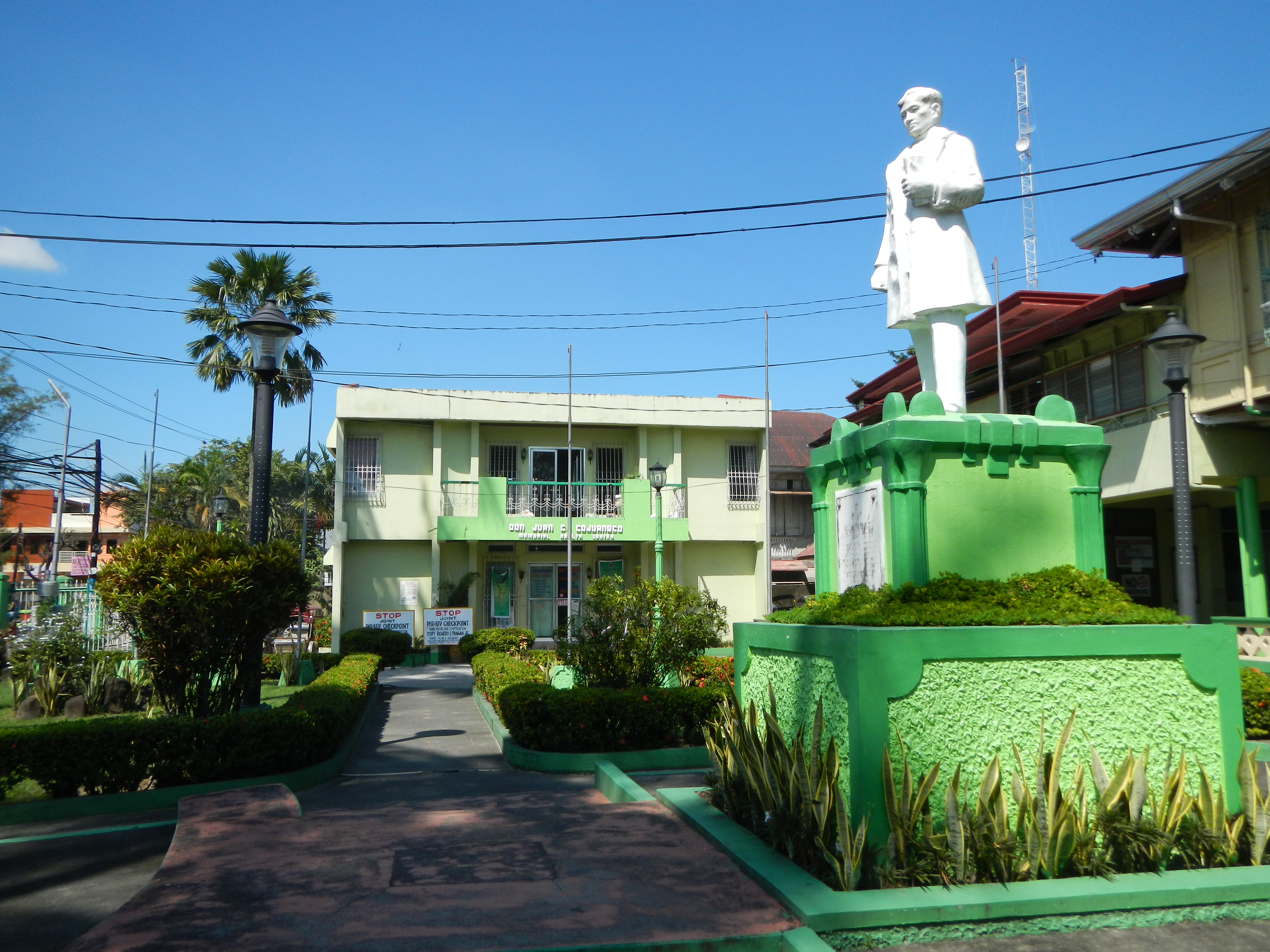
Plaza of Rizal

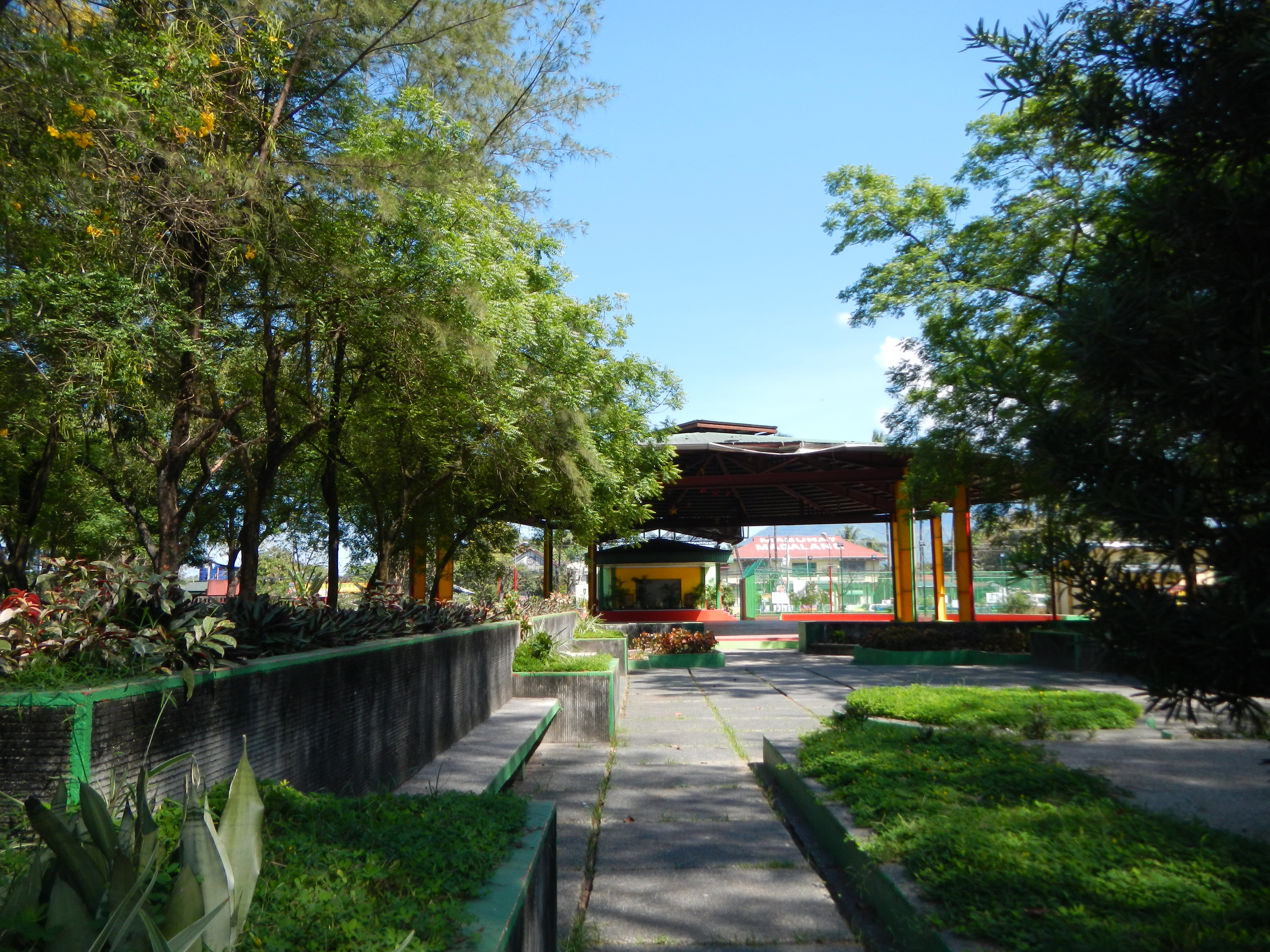
Covered court

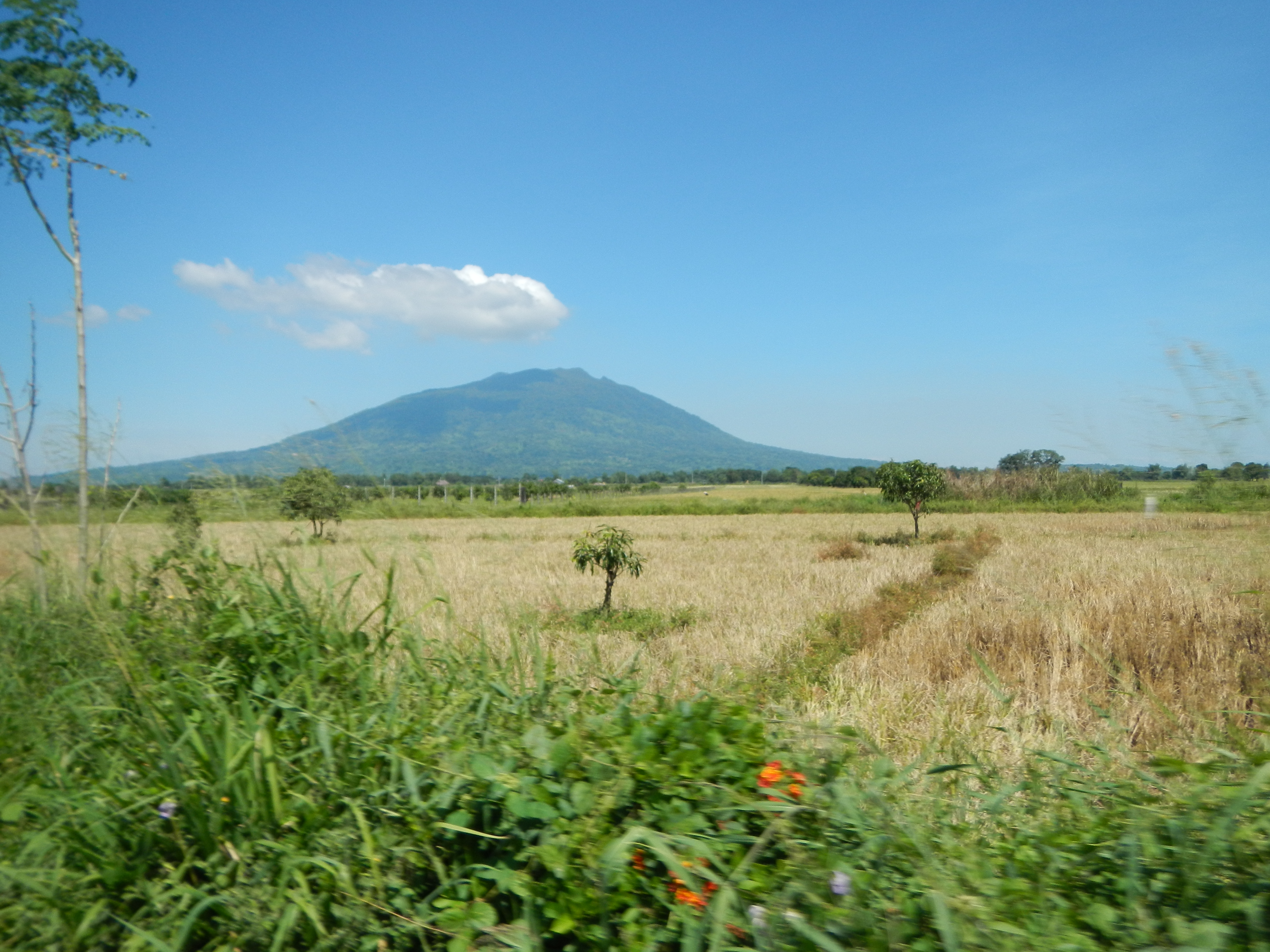
View of Mount Arayat from Magalang, Pampanga highway

Town Plaza
