= HHL =

HHL could refer to:

- Hafthohlladung, a German anti-tank mine of World War II
- Handelshochschule Leipzig, now the HHL Leipzig Graduate School of Management
- Haverhill (Amtrak station), in Massachusetts, United States
- Harrow-Hassidim-Lloyd algorithm, a quantum algorithm for linear systems of equations
- Heath High Level railway station, in Wales
- Herefordshire Housing, a British social housing trust
- Hecht-Hill-Lancaster Productions
- Higher Hockey League, a Eurasian ice hockey league
- Highway Hockey League, a Canadian ice hockey league
