= Hillcrest Heights Institute =

School in Pampanga, Philippines

Coordinates: 15°12′27″N 120°40′06″E

Information
- School type: Private school
- Established: 2005; 20 years ago

Hillcrest Heights Institute (HHI) is a private school located in the barangay of San Francisco, Magalang, Pampanga. The school was established in June 2005 by the Tolentino family in response to the increasing population and modernization of Magalang and its surrounding areas.
