= Haplogroup H1 =

Haplogroup H1 may refer to:

- H1, in human mitochondrial DNA, a haplogroup contained in a significant fraction of individuals of Western European heritage
- H1, in human Y-chromosome DNA, a haplogroup common in South Asian individuals
- H1, in the MAPT (Tau protein) gene on human chromosome 17, a haplogroup associated with increased probability of certain dementias when compared to haplogroup H2
