= Jeci Lapus =

Filipino engineer and politician (1953–2021)

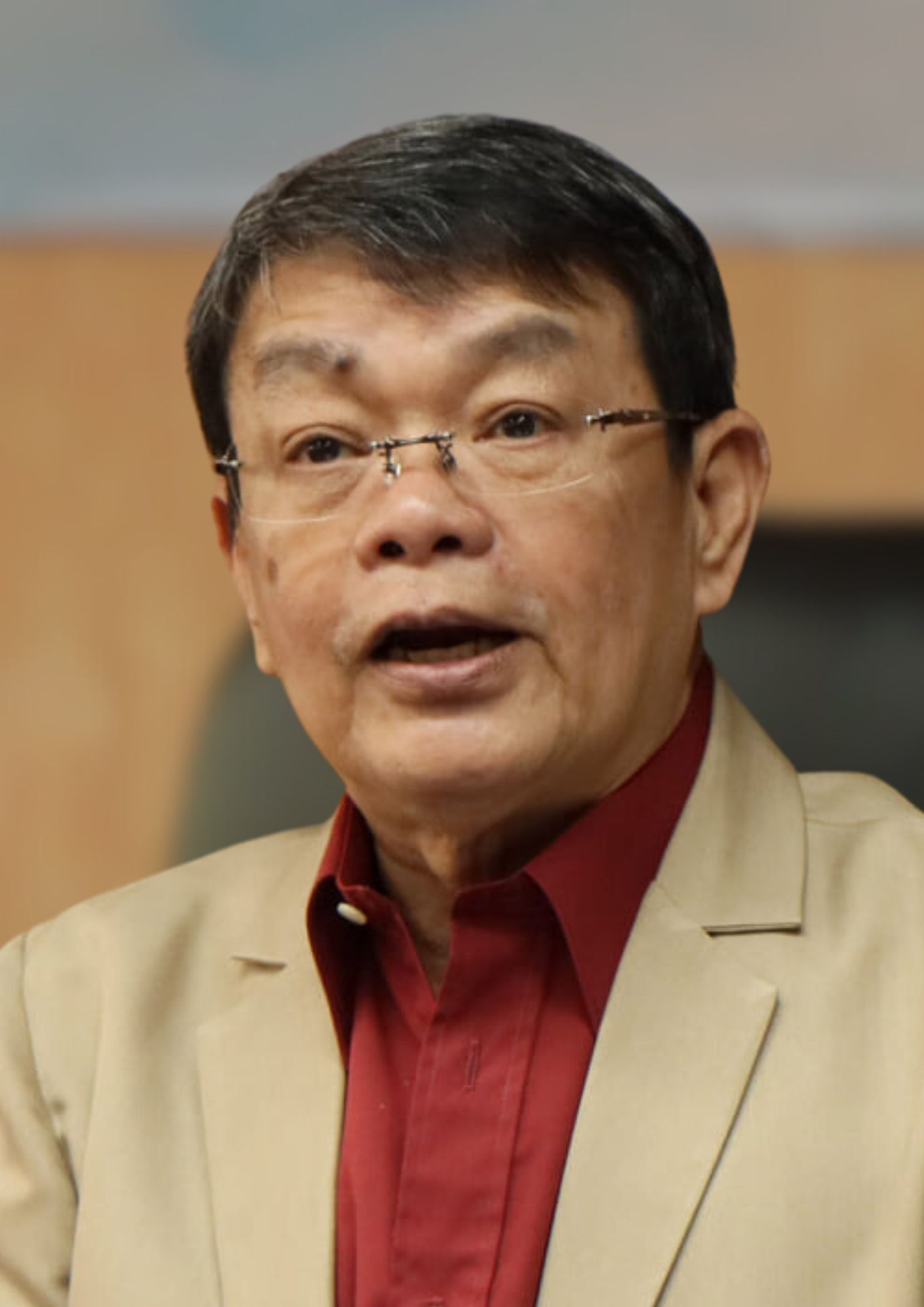
- Lapus in 2021

Member of the Philippine House of Representatives from Tarlac's 3rd district
- In office June 30, 2007 – June 30, 2013
- Preceded by: Jesli Lapus
- Succeeded by: Noel Villanueva

Personal details
- Born: Jeci Aquino Lapus; April 13, 1953 Tarlac, Tarlac, Philippines
- Died: July 11, 2021 (aged 68) Taguig City, Philippines
- Party: NUP (2013–2021)
- Other political affiliations: Lakas (2007–2013)
- Parents: Jesus R. Lapus (father); Estrella S. Aquino (mother)
- Education: Mapúa University
- Profession: Engineer

Jeci Aquino Lapus (April 13, 1953 – July 11, 2021) was a Philippine engineer and politician who served as a member of the House of Representatives of the Philippines representing Tarlac's 3rd congressional district from 2007 to 2013. Prior to his death, he had been the acting administrator of the Local Water Utilities Administration (LWUA) since 2017.

== Early life and education ==
Lapus was born on April 13, 1953, in Tarlac to Jesus Lapus and Estrella Aquino. He was the younger brother of Jesli Lapus and a member of the Aquino family, being a cousin of former President of the Philippines Benigno Aquino III.

He graduated from the Mapúa University with a bachelor's degree in civil engineering. In 1975, he passed the civil engineering board examination administered by the Professional Regulation Commission. He held an honorary doctorate from the Tarlac Agricultural University and also studied business management at the Asian Institute of Management.

== Career ==
A civil engineer by profession, Lapus worked for various private construction companies and government offices early in his career including at the United Coconut Planters Bank, National Irrigation Administration, and Philippine Tourism Authority. From 1998 to 2000, he was vice president of the National Agri-Business Corporation under the Department of Agriculture. He was president of TODO Foundation, Inc. from 1998 to 2005. He also served as a director of the PNOC Exploration Corporation.

During the 2004 general elections, Lapus ran as mayor of Concepcion, Tarlac, but lost. In 2007, he was elected to the House of Representatives succeeding his brother who earlier resigned to become Secretary of Education. He was endorsed by then-President Gloria Macapagal Arroyo and ran under Lakas–CMD. He won a second term during the 2010 elections, serving until 2013. In the 14th Congress, he was vice chairman of the Committees on Good Government and Public Accountability, Information and Communications Technology, and Public Information.

In 2014, Lapus was elected as director of the BDO's leasing and finance subsidiary. He previously served as independent director of the PCIBank Group's leasing and finance subsidiary from 2005 to 2006.

In 2017, he was appointed trustee and acting administrator of the LWUA. He also became a director of the Philippine Water Works Association due to his position.

== Personal life and death ==
Lapus was married to Felycette Gay Martinez, an oncologist, and had one child. He was an avid sportsman with interests in golf and horse breeding.

He died on July 12, 2021, at the St. Luke's Medical Center – Global City due to heart failure. His body was cremated and interred in Davao.
