= Clark Sanitary Landfill =

Sanitary Landfill in Clark, Philippines

Coordinates: 15°17′59.2″N 120°31′22.2″E

The Clark Sanitary Landfill is a landfill at the Clark Special Economic Zone in Capas, Tarlac managed and operated by the Metro Clark Waste Management Corp. It stores and process waste from the Clark area as well as other areas in Central and Northern Luzon.

== History ==
In 1998, the Capas local government passed a resolution 100 hectares (250 acres) in Kalangitan as a site for a future waste dumping site as part of the Clark Integrated Waste Management Project, a joint venture between the Clark Development Corporation and a German consortium consisting of Ingenieurbüro Birkhahn and Heers & Brocksted. The Aeta community, who were resettled in the area from Porac, Pampanga after the 1991 eruption of Mount Pinatubo, opposed the project. Minority Rights Group International claimed that they eventually settled back in their original area.

Opposition to the landfill also include residents of Capas including its Mayor Ray Catacutan who were concerned that the dumping facility will be used to store waste from Metro Manila as well as the site's potential adverse environmental impact. Capas's opposition ceased after Capas's Mayor visited the site who was left impressed with the site's facilities after conducting an inspection. Capas officials and residents also initially opposed the landfill project but also likewise changed their stance after being brief of the technology used at the sanitary landfill.

The Clark Sanitary Landfill began operations in 2002. The landfill's managing company, the Metro Clark Waste Management Corp. (MCWM) was incorporated on the same year. Upon starting operations, the dumping facility became the first engineered landfill in the Philippines. The landfill cost $215 million.

The areas serviced by the Clark Sanitary Landfill was limited to Tarlac and the Clark Special Economic Zone by the Tarlac provincial government in its early years of operations. Eventually the Clark landfill was allowed to process waste from outside the province and the Clark area.

The Capas, Tarlac Kalangitan Sanitary Landfill's operators Metro Clark Waste Management Corp.-Bases Conversion and Development Authority announced its closure by October 5, 2024. The Angeles City Regional Trial Court Branch 114 dismissed MCWMC's lawsuit against CDC and the BCDA due to forum shopping, since it previously filed a separate civil case against CDC and BCDA in the Capas court. With the decision, CDC and the BCDA are empowered to coordinate with the DENR regarding waste management in the affected provinces. The Court of Appeals, however, issued a 60-day restraining order against the Capas RTC injunction blocking the landfill forcible takeover by the CDC and BCDA.

== Areas served ==
The Clark Sanitary Landfill process waste from both the Clark and Subic Freeports. As of 2019, it process waste from around 100 local government units in Luzon. Its biggest customers in that year include the cities of Cabanatuan in Nueva Ecija, Angeles in Pampanga and Tarlac City. It also process waste from a few town in La Union and Pangasinan in the Ilocos region as well as waste from Baguio.

== Facilities ==
The landfill is located in Sitio Kalangitan in Capas, Tarlac within the Subzone D of the Clark Special Economic Zone. It covers an area of 100 hectares (250 acres), with 70 percent allocated as a dumping site, 10 percent for recycling facilities and 15 percent designated as an environmental buffer.

There are plans to set up a waste-to-power plant in the landfill.
