= Tarlac's 3rd congressional district =

Legislative district of the Philippines

- Constituency for the House of Representatives of the Philippines
- Map
- Location of Tarlac within the Philippines
- Province: Tarlac
- Region: Central Luzon
- Population: 427,873 (2015)
- Electorate: 249,363 (2019)
- Major settlements: 4 LGUs: Municipalities; Bamban; Capas; Concepcion; La Paz
- Area: 985.69 km^{2} (380.58 sq mi)

Current constituency
- Created: 1987
- Representative: Noel N. Rivera
- Political party: NPC
- Congressional bloc: Majority

Tarlac's 3rd congressional district is one of the three congressional districts of the Philippines in the province of Tarlac. It has been represented in the House of Representatives since 1987. The district consists of the southern Tarlac municipalities of Bamban, Capas, Concepcion and La Paz. It is currently represented in the 20th Congress by Noel N. Rivera of the Nationalist People's Coalition (NPC).

== Representation history ==
#	Image	Member	Term of office		Congress	Party	Electoral history	Constituent LGUs
#	Image	Member	Start	End	Congress	Party	Electoral history	Constituent LGUs
=== Tarlac's 3rd district for the House of Representatives of the Philippines ===
District created February 2, 1987.
1		Herminio Aquino	June 30, 1987	June 30, 1998	8th	PDP–Laban	Elected in 1987.	1987–present Bamban, Capas, Concepcion, La Paz
1		Herminio Aquino	June 30, 1987	June 30, 1998	9th	LDP	Re-elected in 1992.	1987–present Bamban, Capas, Concepcion, La Paz
1		Herminio Aquino	June 30, 1987	June 30, 1998	10th	LDP	Re-elected in 1995.	1987–present Bamban, Capas, Concepcion, La Paz
2		Jesli Lapus	June 30, 1998	July 24, 2006	11th	Lakas	Elected in 1998.	1987–present Bamban, Capas, Concepcion, La Paz
2		Jesli Lapus	June 30, 1998	July 24, 2006	12th	NPC	Re-elected in 2001.	1987–present Bamban, Capas, Concepcion, La Paz
2		Jesli Lapus	June 30, 1998	July 24, 2006	13th	NPC	Re-elected in 2004. Resigned on appointment as Secretary of Education.	1987–present Bamban, Capas, Concepcion, La Paz
3		Jeci A. Lapus	June 30, 2007	June 30, 2013	14th	Lakas	Elected in 2007.	1987–present Bamban, Capas, Concepcion, La Paz
3		Jeci A. Lapus	June 30, 2007	June 30, 2013	15th	NUP	Re-elected in 2010.	1987–present Bamban, Capas, Concepcion, La Paz
4		Noel L. Villanueva	June 30, 2013	June 30, 2022	16th	Nacionalista	Elected in 2013.	1987–present Bamban, Capas, Concepcion, La Paz
4		Noel L. Villanueva	June 30, 2013	June 30, 2022	17th	NPC	Re-elected in 2016.	1987–present Bamban, Capas, Concepcion, La Paz
4		Noel L. Villanueva	June 30, 2013	June 30, 2022	18th	NPC	Re-elected in 2019.	1987–present Bamban, Capas, Concepcion, La Paz
5		Noel N. Rivera	June 30, 2022	Incumbent	19th	NPC	Elected in 2022.	1987–present Bamban, Capas, Concepcion, La Paz

== Election results ==
=== 2025 ===
2025 Philippine House of Representatives elections
Candidate	Party	Votes	%
Bong Rivera (incumbent)	Nationalist People's Coalition	186,630	84.94
Fernando David	Partido Federal ng Pilipinas	25,243	11.49
Son Marimla	Independent	4,232	1.93
Steve Liwanag	Independent	3,614	1.64
Total		219,719	100.00
Valid votes		219,719	85.21
Invalid/blank votes		38,132	14.79
Total votes		257,851	100.00
Registered voters/turnout		294,043	87.69
Nationalist People's Coalition hold			
Source: Commission on Elections

=== 2022 ===
2022 Philippine House of Representatives elections
Party	Candidate	Votes	%
NPC	Noel "Bong" Rivera	112,620	
Aksyon	Andy Lacson	82,583	
Independent	Jose Antonio Feliciano	38,331	
Total votes			100.00
NPC hold			

=== 2019 ===
2019 Philippine House of Representatives election at Tarlac's 3rd district
Party	Candidate	Votes	%
NPC	Noel Villanueva	135,449	73.97
Independent	Hariking David	44,678	24.40
Independent	Bertito del Mundo	2,991	1.63
Valid ballots		183,118	89.72
Invalid or blank votes		20,997	10.28
Total votes		204,095	100.00
NPC hold			

=== 2016 ===
2016 Philippine House of Representatives election at Tarlac's 3rd district
Party	Candidate	Votes	%
NPC	Noel Villanueva	130,611	100.00
Invalid or blank votes		48,476	27.07
Total votes		179,087	100.00
NPC hold			

=== 2013 ===
2013 Philippine House of Representatives election at Tarlac's 3rd district
Party	Candidate	Votes	%
Nacionalista	Noel Villanueva	65,465	53.73
NUP	Jeci Lapus	27,345	22.44
Liberal	Herminio Aquino	23,034	18.90
Margin of victory		38,120	31.28%
Invalid or blank votes		6,006	4.93
Total votes		121,850	100.00
Nacionalista gain from NUP			

=== 2010 ===
Philippine House of Representatives election at Tarlac's 3rd district
Party	Candidate	Votes	%
Lakas–Kampi	Jeci A. Lapus	82,093	55.43
Liberal	Reynaldo Lopez Catacutan	65,997	44.57
Valid ballots		148,090	96.11
Invalid or blank votes		5,997	3.89
Total votes		154,087	100.00
Lakas–Kampi hold			

== See also ==
- Legislative districts of Tarlac
