= Immaculate Conception Parish Church (Concepcion) =

Roman Catholic church in Tarlac, Philippines

Concepcion Church
- Santuario de la Inmaculada Concepcion
- Immaculate Conception Parish Church
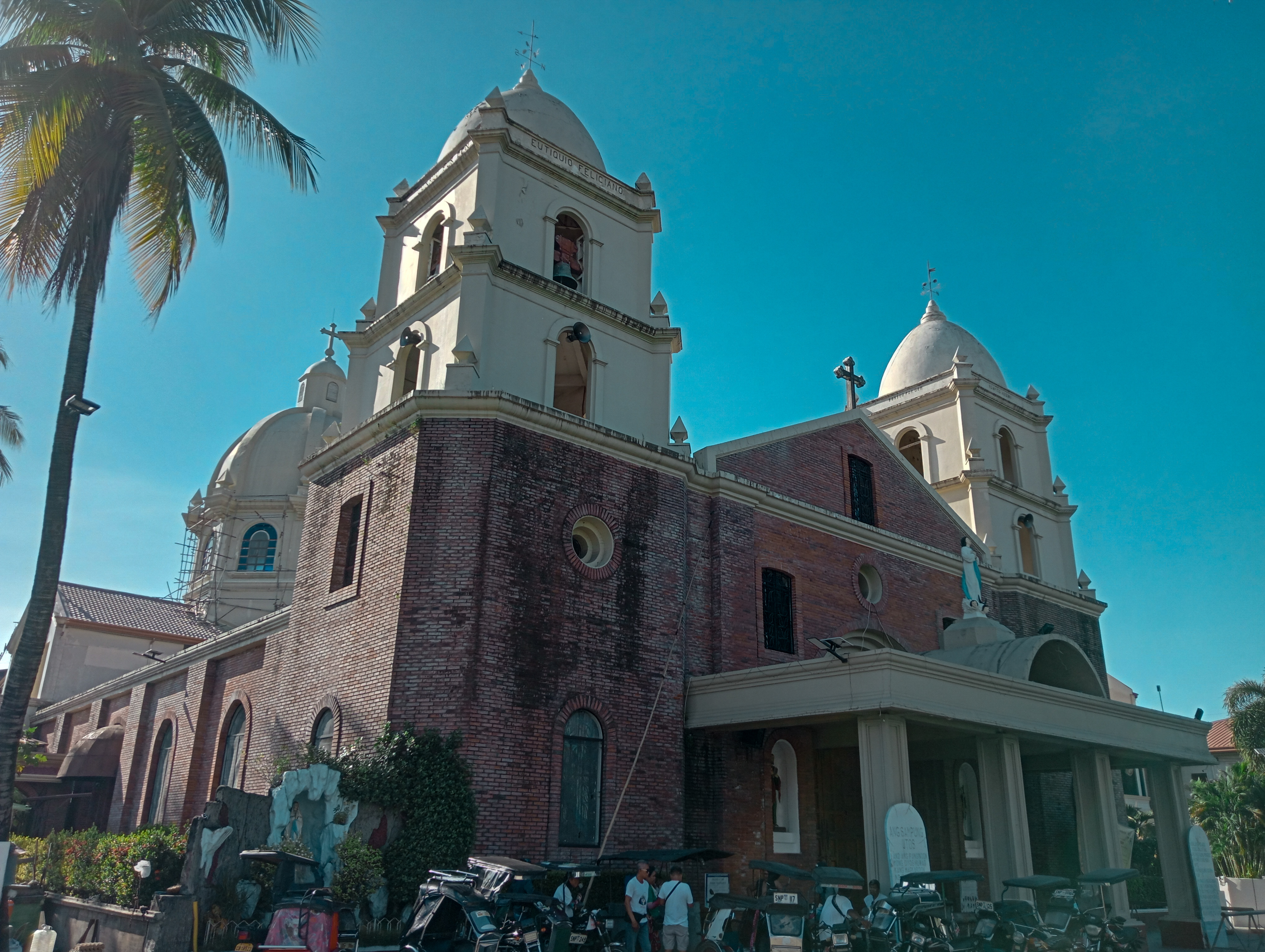
- Church facade in 2023

- Location in Luzon Location in the Philippines
- 15°19′27″N 120°34′35″E
- Location: Tarlac
- Country: Philippines
- Denomination: Roman Catholic

History
- Former name: Immaculate Conception Parish Church
- Status: Parish church
- Dedication: Our Lady of the Immaculate Conception
- Dedicated: 1866

Architecture
- Functional status: Active
- Architectural type: Church building
- Style: Neo-Romanesque
- Completed: 1893

Specifications
- Materials: Brick, mortar, gravel, cement, steel, concrete

Administration
- Province: San Fernando
- Archdiocese: San Fernando
- Diocese: Tarlac

Clergy
- Bishop(s): Most Rev. Fr. Roberto Mallari, D.D.

The Santuario de la Inmaculada Concepcion (transl. Shrine of the Immaculate Conception), also known as Immaculate Conception Parish Church and Concepcion Church, is a late 19th-century, Baroque Roman Catholic church located at Brgy. San Nicolas Poblacion, Concepcion, Tarlac, Philippines. The parish church, under the aegis of Our Lady of the Immaculate Conception, is under the jurisdiction of the Diocese of Tarlac.

== Parish history ==
History suggests two origins for the town of Concepcion. First, Concepcion was already an established parish separate from its matrix in Magalang, Pampanga on August 9, 1866. The second story is that it was created in 1860 from the following barrios of Magalang: Matondo, Maycanalo, San Martin, Bucsit, San Juan and Garlit.

== Architecture ==
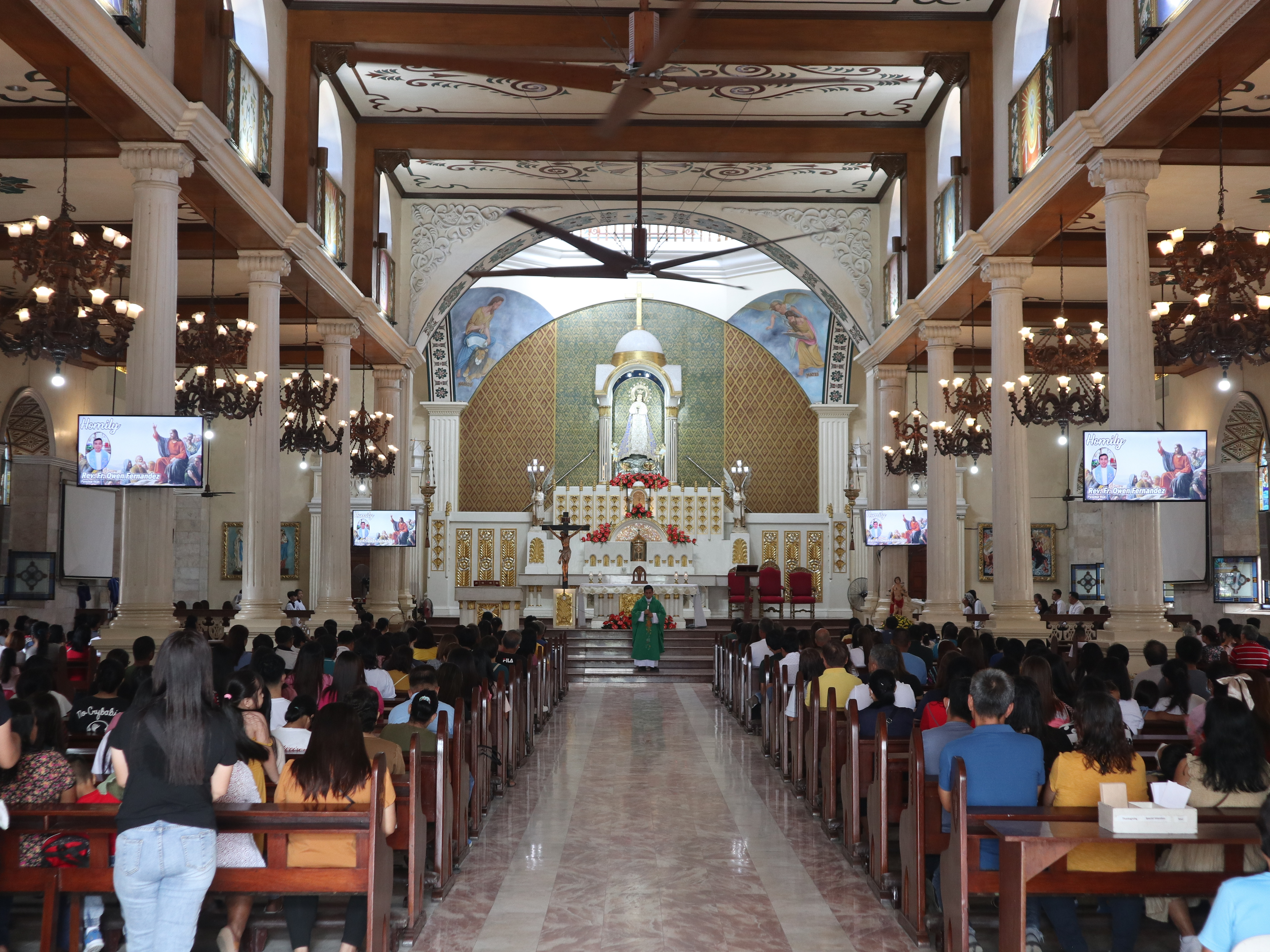
Church interior in 2023

The stone and brick convent was said to have been erected by Father Guillermo Masnou in 1880 while the present-day church was built by Father Fernando Vasquez in 1893. Its facade was described as being identical to that of the pre-war church of Tarlac. It is predominantly Neo-Romanesque in design with the presence of the recessed arch on the central part of the facade (marred by the concrete porte cochere). The facade is bare of ornamentation save for several circular and semicircular arched windows. Two, three-tiered, bell towers rise on both sides of the facades.
