= Bong Rivera =

Filipino politician and businessman (born 1968)

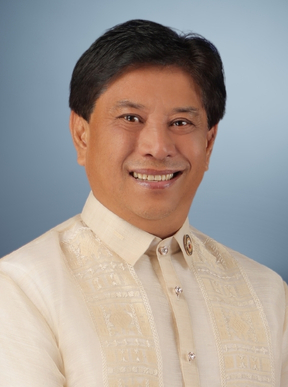
- Official portrait, 2025

Member of the House of Representatives from Tarlac's 3rd district
- Incumbent
- Assumed office June 30, 2022 (Note: Suspended since September 30, 2026)
- Preceded by: Noel Villanueva

Personal details
- Born: Noel Nudo Rivera; August 27, 1968 (age 58)
- Party: NPC (2021–present)
- Occupation: Politician, businessman

Noel "Bong" Nudo Rivera (born August 27, 1968) is a Filipino politician and businessman. He is currently serving as representative of the 3rd District of Tarlac in the House of Representatives of the Philippines since 2022.

== Political career ==
Rivera was served as barangay captain in Brgy. San Francisco, Concepcion, Tarlac. He also served as chairman and president of the Association of Barangay Captains (ABC).

In 2022, Rivera was elected as representative for third district of Tarlac.

== Electoral history ==
=== 2025 ===
Candidate	Party	Votes	%
Bong Rivera (incumbent)	Nationalist People's Coalition	186,630	84.94
Fernando David	Partido Federal ng Pilipinas	25,243	11.49
Son Marimla	Independent	4,232	1.93
Steve Liwanag	Independent	3,614	1.64
Total		219,719	100.00
Valid votes		219,719	85.21
Invalid/blank votes		38,132	14.79
Total votes		257,851	100.00
Registered voters/turnout		294,043	87.69
Nationalist People's Coalition hold			
Source: Commission on Elections

=== 2022 ===
Candidate	Party	Votes	%
Bong Rivera	Nationalist People's Coalition	114,223	48.28
Andres Lacson	Aksyon Demokratiko	83,866	35.45
Jose Antonio Feliciano	Independent	38,484	16.27
Total		236,573	100.00
Total votes		248,343	–
Registered voters/turnout		279,907	88.72
Nationalist People's Coalition hold			
Source: Commission on Elections
