= Capas =

Municipality in Tarlac, Philippines

- Municipality
- Municipality of Capas
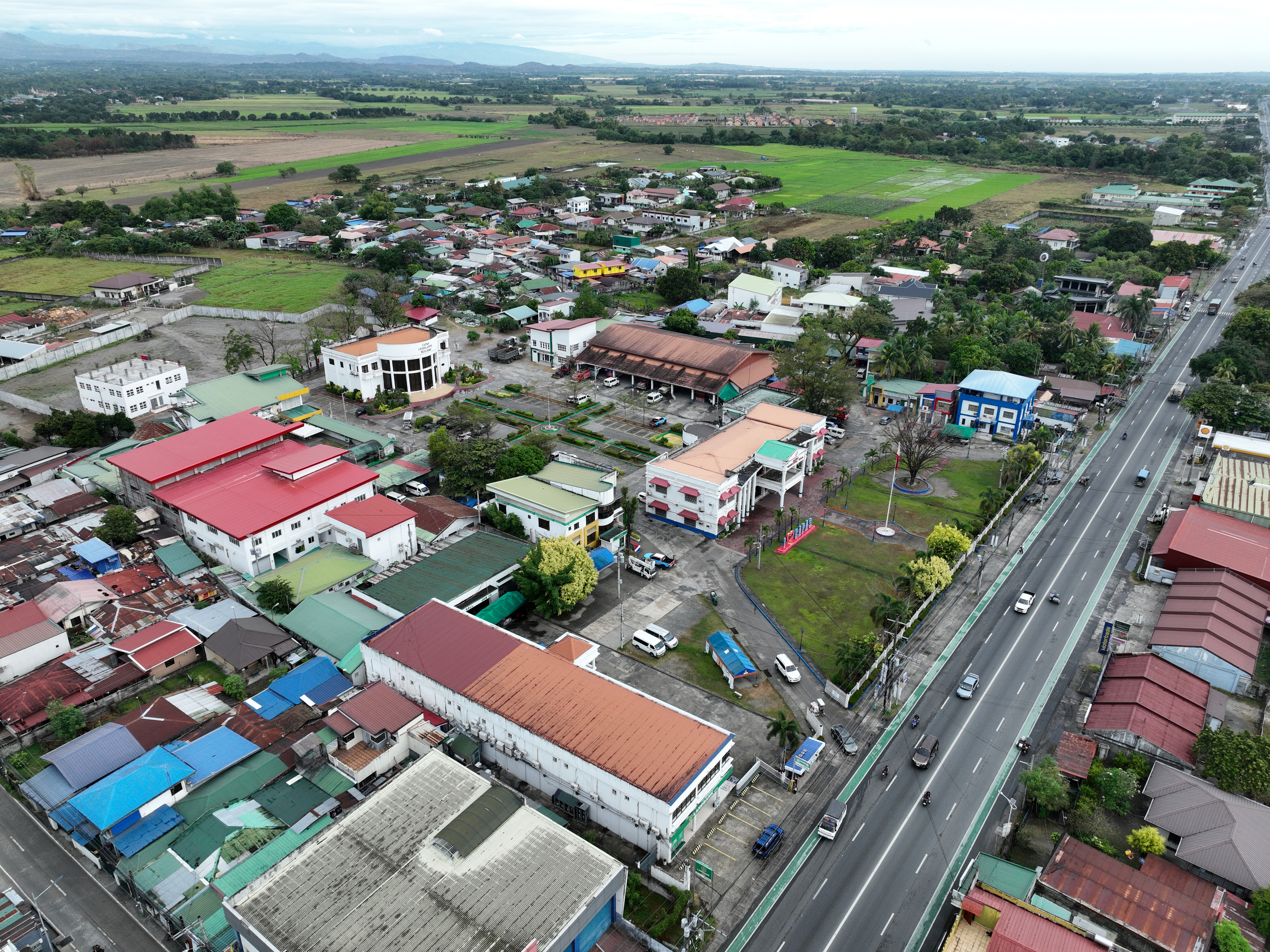
- Aerial view

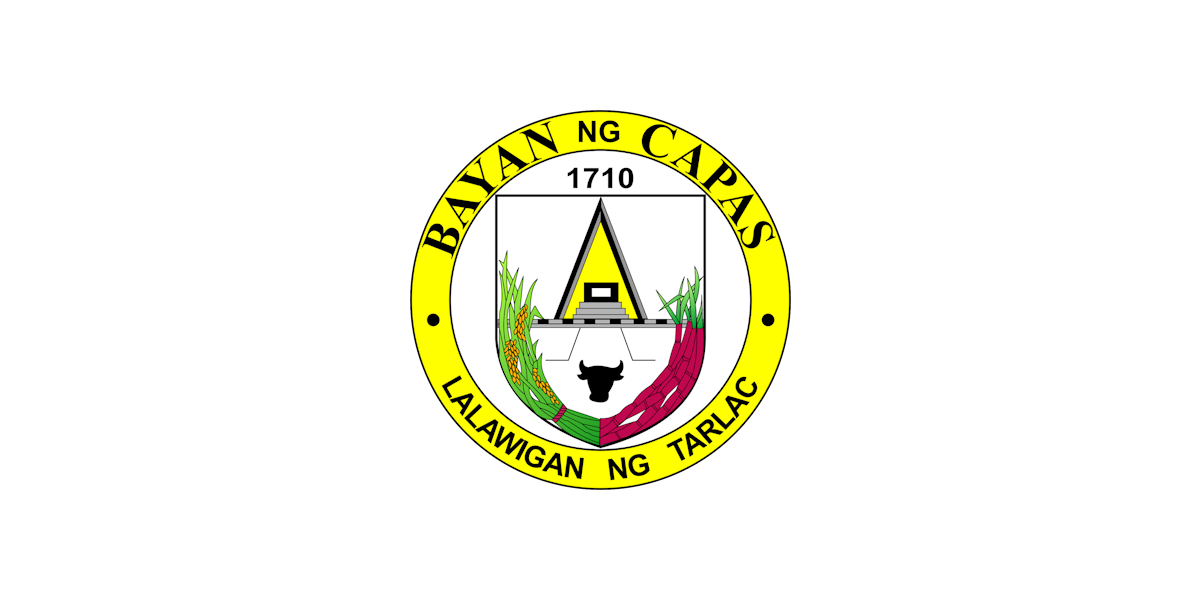
- Flag Seal
- Motto: "Sa Gobyernong Tapat, Capas ang Aangat."
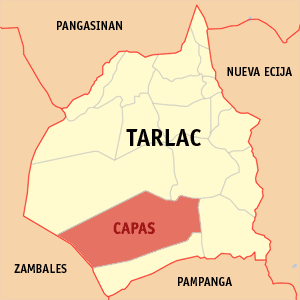
- Map of Tarlac with Capas highlighted
- Interactive map of Capas
- Location within the Philippines
- Coordinates: 15°20′14″N 120°35′24″E
- Country: Philippines
- Region: Central Luzon
- Province: Tarlac
- District: 3rd district
- Founded: December 10, 1712
- Barangays: 20 (see Barangays)

Government
  - Type: Sangguniang Bayan
  - Mayor: Roseller B. Rodriguez
  - Vice Mayor: Alex C. Espinosa
  - Representative: Noel N. Rivera
  - Municipal Council: Members: Jeff Darlson D. Ticsay; Felipe L. Ong; Estela S. Manlupig; Jesus M. Lopez; Alejandro T. Duenas; Ariel G. Batican; Editha M. Yumul; Nestor D. Sicat

Area
  - Total: 376.39 km^{2} (145.32 sq mi)
- Elevation: 55 m (180 ft)
- Highest elevation: 154 m (505 ft)
- Lowest elevation: 38 m (125 ft)

Population (2024 census)
  - Total: 162,724
  - Density: 432.33/km^{2} (1,119.7/sq mi)
  - Households: 37,160

Economy
  - Income class: 1st municipal income class
  - Poverty incidence: 15.37% (2023)
  - Revenue: ₱ 793.2 million (2024)
  - Assets: ₱ 1,546 million (2024)
  - Expenditure: ₱ 747.5 million (2024)
  - Liabilities: ₱ 684.7 million (2024)

Service provider
  - Electricity: Tarlac 2 Electric Cooperative (TARELCO 2)
- Time zone: UTC+8 (PST)
- ZIP code: 2315, 2023 (portions under Clark Freeport and Special Economic Zone)
- PSGC: 0306904000
- IDD : area code: +63 (0)45
- Native languages: Kapampangan; Tagalog; Ilocano
- Website: www.capastarlac.gov.ph

Capas, officially the Municipality of Capas (Kapampangan: Balen ning Capas; Tagalog: Bayan ng Capas), is a municipality in the province of Tarlac, Philippines. According to the 2024 census, it has a population of 162,724 people.

It is one of the richest towns in the province. The town also consists of numerous subdivisions and exclusive villages.

Capas is known as the “Tourism Capital of Tarlac." Apart from being known as the final site of the infamous Bataan Death March, it is also known for Mount Pinatubo treks, where thousands of mountaineers and visitors go. The town has some industrial factories like the PilMiCo.

== History ==
Originally a part of Zambales and Pampanga, its first settlers were the Kapampangan and the Aeta. It was founded in 1710 by the Augustinian Friars.

Capas as all other towns in Tarlac province was a part of vast wilderness inhabited by the Abelling tribes known as Aetas. The history of Capas dates back in the late 16th century when immigrants from Pampanga, Zambales, Pangasinan and the Ilocos region flock into the settlements. It is considered the oldest town in Tarlac. Capas became a pueblo (town) in 1710 beginning as a sleepy settlement at a place between Cutcut River in Sitio Pagbatuan and Gudya (present site) founded by Kapitan Mariano Capiendo. Capas' patron saint is San Nicolas de Tolentino. September 9–10 is the Capas Town Fiesta. Tarlac province was founded on May 28, 1874.

In the course of time, the townspeople of Capas were ordered by the Spanish authorities to change their family name of their own choosing on condition such family names begin with letter "C", the first letter of Capas. Descendants of the early inhabitants still hold to this day such family names as Capiendo, Capuno, Capitulo, Capule, Capunpun, Cayabyab, Castañeda and Catacutan.

In the 1850s, Capas was a part of the western Pampanga Commandancia Militar de Tarlac which includes the town of Bamban, Concepcion, Victoria, O’Donnell, Murcia, Moriones, Florida Blanca, Porac, Mabalacat, and Magalang.

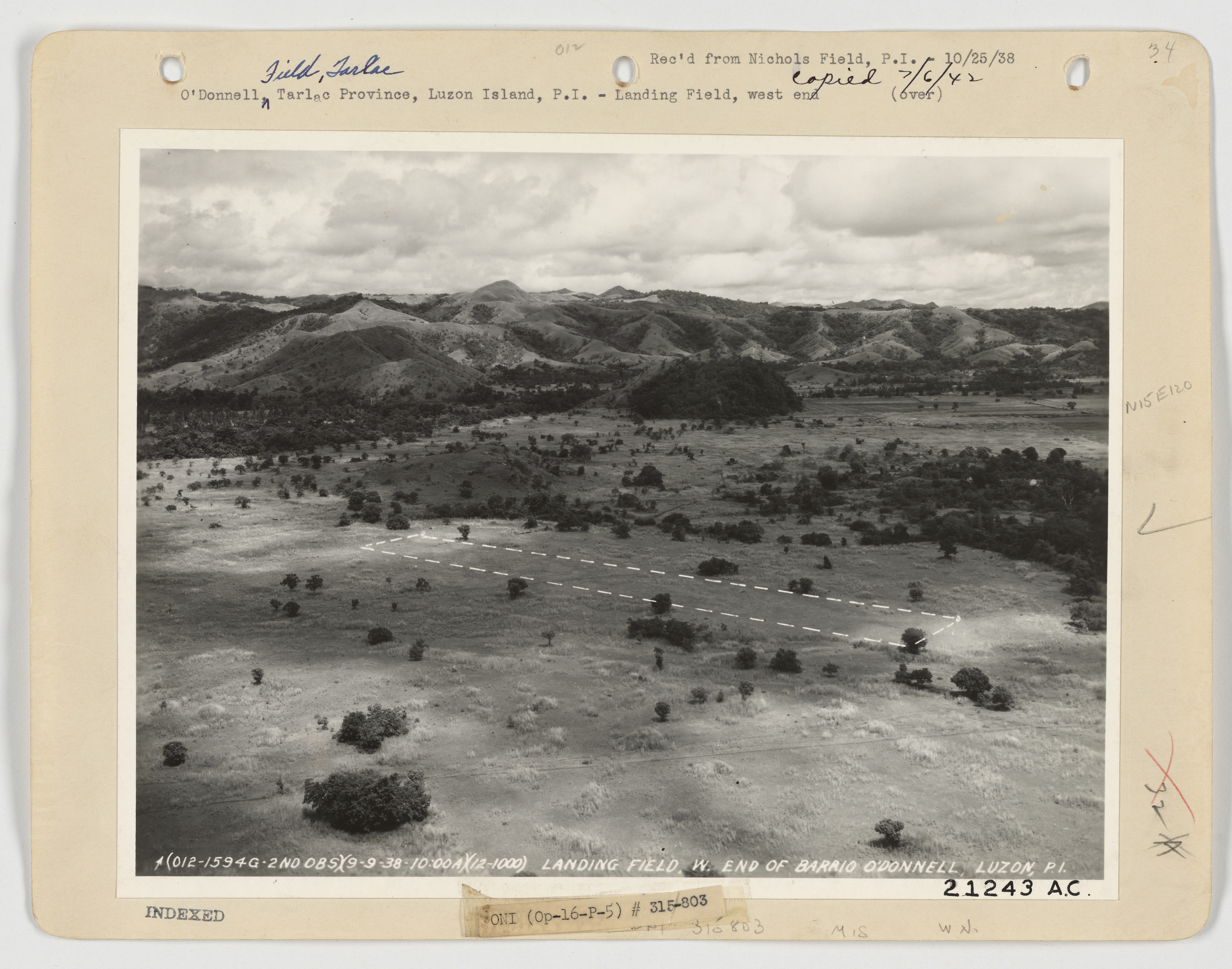
O'Donnell Field in 1938

O’Donnell (Patling) was then a bustling pueblo established by the Augustinians Recolletos Mission in the 1800s, named in honor of Carlos O’Donnell y Abreu, the Spanish Minister of State who visited the Patling pueblo. O’Donnell was reverted as a barrio of Capas by the Philippine Commission of 1902 including Moriones reverted to Tarlac town and Murcia back to Concepcion.

Of the etymology of Capas, old folks believed it derived its name from a wild vine "Capas-capas" or it originated from a tree called Capas in the Aetas dialect, Bulak in Pampango or Capaz in Ilocano.

Capas was the site of Camp O’Donnell, a concentration camp subsequently serving as the burial grounds for thousands of Filipino and American soldiers who perished during World War II. The site was the ultimate destination point of the Bataan Death March involving Filipino and American soldiers who surrendered in Bataan on April 9, 1942.

The camp was previously a facility of the United States Air Force. Before the facility was transferred to the Philippine Air Force, it was first a Philippine Constabulary post then a United States Army facility.

Another site in Capas, the Santo Domingo Death March Marker, was where about 60,000 Filipino soldiers were camped and eventually unloaded to start the second phase of the Death March.

=== Development of New Clark City and eviction of Aetas ===
New Clark City Sports Complex

New Clark City ground broke in 2016 and is envisioned as a Business Contingency Hub of the National Government where it serves as a backup office should Metro Manila experience emergencies such as earthquakes, floods, and other calamities. It is located in the Bases Conversion and Development Authority (BCDA) reservation in Capas that used to be a test site of military aircraft when Clark Air Base was under control of the United States. NCC will also serve as the primary venue of the 2019 Southeast Asian Games.

Phase one of New Clark City covers 9,450 hectares of land and displaced more than 27,500 Aetas. Some families were given a week to vacate their homes in 2019 before the start of the SEA Games. In 2019, the BCDA, citing the absence of a Certificate of Ancestral Domain Title, ordered the eviction of over 500 Aeta families for the expansion of New Clark City. In December 2019, Senator Risa Hontiveros filed a Senate resolution to investigate the eviction, stating "There is a need to ensure the protection of Aetas and other indigenous communities from unjust expulsion from a land that has served as their home and have tilled since time immemorial".

== Geography ==
Capas has relatively high ground, hilly places near the mountain range are at an approximate 46 meters. It is bordered by San Jose to the north, Tarlac City to the north-east, Concepcion to the east, Botolan, Zambales, to the west and south-west, and Bamban to south. The western side of the town is mountainous while the eastern side is a plain.

The town is also known as "The Gateway to Pinatubo Volcano." The town also consists of Hot springs and several freshwater lakes like the Tambo Lake. Capas is 108 kilometres (67 mi) north of Manila and is 16 kilometres (9.9 mi) southwest of the provincial capital, Tarlac City.

Many of the streams in the province contain small bits of petrified wood, fish, freshwater crabs, and other animals. Namria and Dingding creek merge as the two major tributaries to Lucong river in Concepcion. Most of Tarlac's waterways that originate from Mount Pinatubo pass through Capas, including the Bulsa Moriones River and Santa Lucia River that form Tarlac River.

=== Barangays ===
Capas is politically subdivided into 20 barangays, as shown below. Each barangay consists of puroks and some have sitios.

- Aranguren — named after Archbishop Jose Aranguren (OAS), the Roman Catholic Administrator of this area during the Spanish mission and colonization time
- Bueno
- Cristo Rey (formerly known as Navy)
- Cubcub (Poblacion)
- Cutcut 1st (Poblacion)
- Cutcut 2nd (Poblacion)
- Dolores (Poblacion)
- Estrada (Calingcuan)
- Lawy
- Manga
- Manlapig
- Maruglu
- O'Donnell
- Santa Juliana
- Santa Lucia
- Santa Rita
- Santo Domingo 1st (Poblacion)
- Santo Domingo 2nd (Poblacion)
- Santo Rosario (Poblacion)
- Talaga

The original Capas was Pagbatuan where the Aetas resides before the new settlers came to the now proper town of Capas. Barangay Cutcut, meaning "to bury", or "burial", is known for its landfill where garbage from other municipalities is disposed. Malutung gabun or Red soil has a replica of Capas National Shrine which is sometimes featured on Philippine maps. Barangay Santo Rosario (Holy Rosary) has Villa De Santo Rosario, Rosary-ville, Small Tokyo which was formerly a Japanese Garrison hence its name, Pascuala which has the most poultries and piggeries in Capas it also has one of the most polluted tributaries to Lucong river because surrounding piggeries have made it wastewaters for pig excrement, despite protests, the government has taken little to no action regarding the pollution caused by piggeries.

Pinagpala which has a sugar-cane farm, mango plantations, etc. Santo Rosario is also the location of Capas Public Cemetery or Cabu Santu, the original Capas cemetery was once located where the entrance way to Small Tokyo near the Barangay Hall, as well as the San Nicolas De Tolentino Parish which is the town church that stands next to the Dominican College of Tarlac. Other schools in Capas include Capas East Central School, Capas High School (Formerly: Dolores High School), Gabaldon Elementary School, Montessori School of St. Nicholas among others. Wellspring High School and Capas Christian School are the new private schools.

Cubcub, Cut-Cut II, Santo Domingo I, Santo Domingo II, and Santo Rosario are the town's poblacion and location of the public market. Santa Rita is among the smallest barrios (barangays) of the municipality but has a church and school. Barangay Talaga is known for its production of Tinapa or smoked fish, Barangay Dolores has its garden plants and Santo Domingo has the Capas Junction which also has fast-food chains like the town proper. Barangay Aranguren (aling goring) is home to Poet Laureate Renato Alzadon, who is also known as the current "Ari ning Parnasong Capampangan" or "King of Capampangan Literature", it is also the location of Capas National Shrine, Sitio Kasulukan, Calumpit, Dalang Baka, Aquino Page Village (Kamatis) and Bullhorn.

Barangay Manlapig has rice fields and is among the liveliest barangays during the evening. Barangay Lawy is known for being a place for many of the first Ilocano settlers in the municipality. Barangay Mangga (Mango) used to be filled with the fruit-bearing tree or presumably. Barangay Estrada is the last stop before reaching Tarlac City through McArthur highway. Patling, Santa Lucia, Bueno, Maruglu and Santa Juliana are mountainous and hilly while filled with vast lands and forest, presumably the place where the earliest settlers of the town stayed.

==== Subdivisions and villages ====
As one of the richest towns in the province, it consists of numerous subdivisions and exclusive villages.

- Dominican Hill Subdivision (Cut-Cut 1st)
- Hilltop Subdivision (Cut-Cut 1st)
- Regina Northview Subdivision (Cut-Cut 1st)
- Villa San Jose (Cut-Cut 1st)
- Doña Lutgarda Subdivision (Cut-Cut I)
- Amaia Scapes (Estrada)
- Villa Generosa (Estrada)
- Villa De Concepcion (Talaga)
- BellaVista (Santo Domingo II)
- Vargas Subdivision (Santo Domingo II)
- Villa Necita (Santo Domingo II)
- Villa De Santo Rosario (Santo Rosario)
- RosaryVille (Santo Rosario)
- Saint Paul Homes (Santo Domingo I)
- Robinson Homes Grand Tierra (Santo Domingo I)
- Cenizal Subdivision (Santo Domingo II)
- Kathrine Ville (Cut-Cut 1st)

=== Climate ===
Climate data for Capas, Tarlac
Month	Jan	Feb	Mar	Apr	May	Jun	Jul	Aug	Sep	Oct	Nov	Dec	Year
Mean daily maximum °C (°F)	29 (84)	31 (88)	32 (90)	34 (93)	33 (91)	31 (88)	29 (84)	29 (84)	29 (84)	30 (86)	30 (86)	29 (84)	31 (87)
Mean daily minimum °C (°F)	19 (66)	19 (66)	20 (68)	22 (72)	24 (75)	24 (75)	24 (75)	24 (75)	24 (75)	22 (72)	21 (70)	20 (68)	22 (71)
Average precipitation mm (inches)	5 (0.2)	5 (0.2)	10 (0.4)	23 (0.9)	136 (5.4)	191 (7.5)	245 (9.6)	241 (9.5)	200 (7.9)	108 (4.3)	36 (1.4)	12 (0.5)	1,212 (47.8)
Average rainy days	2.6	2.5	4.4	8.3	20.9	24.4	27.4	26.9	25.0	18.2	9.2	3.6	173.4
Source: Meteoblue (Use with caution: this is modeled/calculated data, not measured locally.)

== Demographics ==
Population census of Capas
Year	Pop.	±% p.a.
1903	6,077	—
1918	9,244	+2.84%
1939	13,178	+1.70%
1948	16,398	+2.46%
1960	26,617	+4.12%
1970	35,515	+2.92%
1975	42,561	+3.70%
1980	46,523	+1.80%
1990	61,205	+2.78%
1995	81,036	+5.40%
2000	95,219	+3.52%
2007	122,084	+3.49%
2010	125,852	+1.11%
2015	140,202	+2.08%
2020	156,056	+2.28%
2024	162,724	+1.01%
Source: Philippine Statistics Authority

In the 2024 census, the population of Capas was 162,724 people, with a density of 430 inhabitants per square kilometre or 1,100 inhabitants per square mile.

=== Languages ===
Kapampangan is the main language of Capas because of the town’s proximity and close ties to Pampanga. Ilocano is also used by the Ilocano population of the surrounding areas in Tarlac, while Tagalog is spoken and is used for administrative functions by the local government, local media and in education.

=== Religion ===
The town is also predominantly Roman Catholic but there are also Christian congregations of some sects, like The United Methodist Church, Iglesia ni Cristo, The Church of Jesus Christ of Latter-day Saints, Jehovah's Witnesses, Baptist and Jesus Miracle Crusade.

== Economy ==
Poverty incidence of Capas (%)

Source: Philippine Statistics Authority

== Tourism ==
Capas is the location of Mount Telakawa or Straw hat Mountain on the boundaries of Santa Juliana and Maruglu. It also provides access to Mount Pinatubo via the preferred route through Barangay Santa Juliana. Mount Bueno is the site of Bueno hot springs in Barangay Bueno. Malatarlak and Salay or Lemon grass grow abundantly on Mor-Asia or Talahib mountain at Sitio Kalangitan. Mount Canouman is the largest in terms of surface area, known as the mountain of Spirits, it is a dangerous 10-hour walk from Sitio Salangui. The majority of mountains in Capas are relatively easy climbs. Mount Dalin, the smaller straw hat mountain is near a 300-meter peak called Prayer Mountain or Peniel where a few rooms are available for rent.

- Mount Pinatubo
- Mount Telakawa
- Mount Canouman
- Bueno Hot Springs
- Tambo Lake
- Peniel
- Pinatubo Trail
- Capas National Shrine
- Hanging Bridge
- War Museum at the old Capas PNR Station
- Asia Golf and Spa

In April 2025, Aeta communities held a protest, calling attention to their exclusion from revenues from tourism on Mount Pinatubo. The protesters said that their calls for the NCIP to address the issue had been ignored. Indigenous rights activist Beverly Longid of KATRIBU said that the NCIP has a history of neglecting the Aeta indigenous peoples. Longid stated that there is a need to recognize "the Aeta and their rights over their ancestral land and territory".

The feast day of San Nicolas De Tolentino is held every 10 September; the origin of the name Capas is disputed but has two prominent sources, it is said that town was either named after the edible plant called Capas-Capas or was taken from the first three letters of the surnames Capitulo, Capunfuerza, Capunpue, Capili, Capongga, Capunpun, Capati, Capil and Capuno, etc. then adding the letters "a" and "s" hence forming "Capas".

=== Capas National Shrine ===
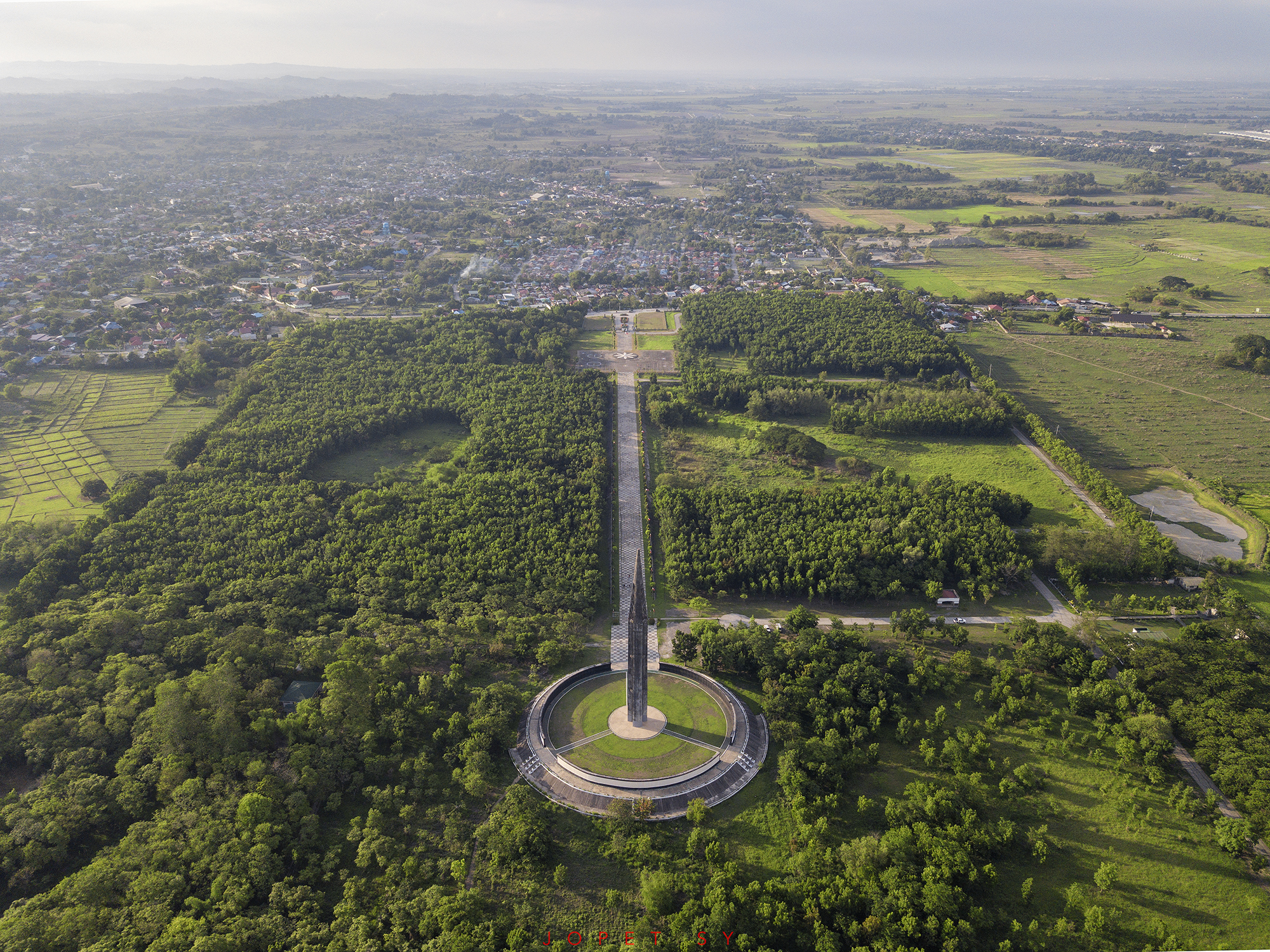
Capas National Shrine

The municipality is home to the Capas National Shrine, an obelisk with a central bell, which was built and is maintained by the Philippine government as a memorial to the Filipino and American soldiers who died in Camp O'Donnell at Barangay Aranguren. during the end of the Bataan Death March. This is an important site related to Veterans Day in the Philippines, every April 9, the anniversary of the surrender of the defending US and Philippine Commonwealth forces to the Japanese in 1942. When the raid at Capas on 1945, combined US and Philippine Commonwealth ground troops supporting local recognized guerrillas freed by few thousands of Filipino and American POW's on Bataan Death March and attacking Japanese forces. This is a memorable site, for all Filipino and Americans veterans. that relates to Veterans Day in the Philippines. It was once a concentration camp subsequently serving as the burial grounds for thousands of Filipino and American soldiers who perished during World War II. The site was the ultimate destination point of the infamous Death March involving Filipino and American soldiers who surrendered in Bataan on April 9, 1942.

Camp O'Donnell was a facility of the United States Air Force in Capas, Tarlac, Philippines. Before the facility was transferred to the Air Force, it was first a Philippine Constabulary post then a United States Army facility.

Another site, Santo Domingo Death March Marker, which is located in Capas were about 60,000 Filipino soldiers who were camped and eventually unloaded to start the second phase of the Death March.

== Government ==
=== Local government ===
Capas Municipal Hall

The following officials assumed their offices on the noon of the 30th day of June, 2022. Except the Ex-officios of the Sangguniang Bayan

=== Mayor ===
Atty. Roseller B. Rodriguez (PDPLaban)

=== Vice-Mayor ===
Alex Espinosa (PDPLaban)

=== Sangguniang Bayan ===
1. Juliet Cabagan (NPC)
2. Felipe Ong (NPC)
3. Estela Manlupig (NPC)
4. Jesus Lopez (NPC)
5. Alejandro Dueñas (PDPLaban)
6. Ariel Batican (PDPLaban)
7. Editha Yumul (PDPLaban)
8. Nestor Sicat (PDPLaban)

Ex-Officio's

- Arnold Arcilla - ABC President
- Victor Valentin - Indigenous' People Representative
- Reymart Catacutan - Federation of the Sangguniang Kabataan President

== Education ==
There are two schools district offices which govern all educational institutions within the municipality. They oversee the management and operations of all private and public, from primary to secondary schools. These are Capas East Schools District Office, and Capas West Schools District Office.

=== Primary and elementary schools ===
- Alunan Elementary School
- Angelina Dizon Jimenez Elementary School (Sto. Domingo Elementary School)
- Aquino Elementary School
- Asian Pacific Christian School
- Benigno Aquino, Jr. Elementary School (Calingcuan Elementary School)
- Binyayan Primary School
- Blessed Trinity Child Development School
- Calangitan Elementary School
- Capas East Central School
- Capas Gabaldon Elementary School
- Capas Good Samaritan School
- Capas West Central Elementary School
- Choong Shin Lawy Christian School
- Cristo Rey Central Elementary School
- Cristo Rey East Elementary School
- Cristo Rey West Elementary School
- Dolores Elementary School
- Flora Primary School
- God's Grace Christian Academy
- Golden Gate Christian School
- Good Shepherd Capas Christian Academy
- Goshen Christian School
- Headway School of Achievers
- Juan Navarro Elementary School
- Kawayan Elementary School
- Kawili-Wili Elementary School
- Lawy Elementary School
- Lightgiver Christian School
- Manabayukan Elementary School
- Manga Elementary School
- Manlapig Elementary School
- Maruglo Elementary School
- Multiple Intelligence Development, Assessment and Simulation (MIDAS) Institute
- Pilien Primary School
- San Agustin Primary School
- Sitio Salangui Primary School
- Sta. Juliana Elementary School
- Sta. Lucia Elementary School
- Sta. Rita Elementary School
- Susuba Elementary School
- Susuba Elementary School (Annex)
- Talaga Elementary School
- Tarukan Elementary School

=== Secondary schools ===
- Aranguren Integrated School
- Bueno Integrated School
- Calangitan High School (Resettlement School)
- Capas High School
- Cristo Rey High School (ORES)
- Dominican College of Tarlac
- Lawy National High School
- Montessori School of St. Nicholas
- O'Donnell High School
- St. Nichole's Technical School
- Sta. Juliana High School (O'Donnell High School Annex)
- Sta. Lucia National High School
- Tip and Point School of Tarlac
- Wellspring High School
- Zion Christian College (formerly

Capas Christian High School)

== Notable personalities ==
- Bernabe Buscayno - revolutionary leader
- Brent Manalo - actor, model, and content creator under Star Magic.

== Gallery ==
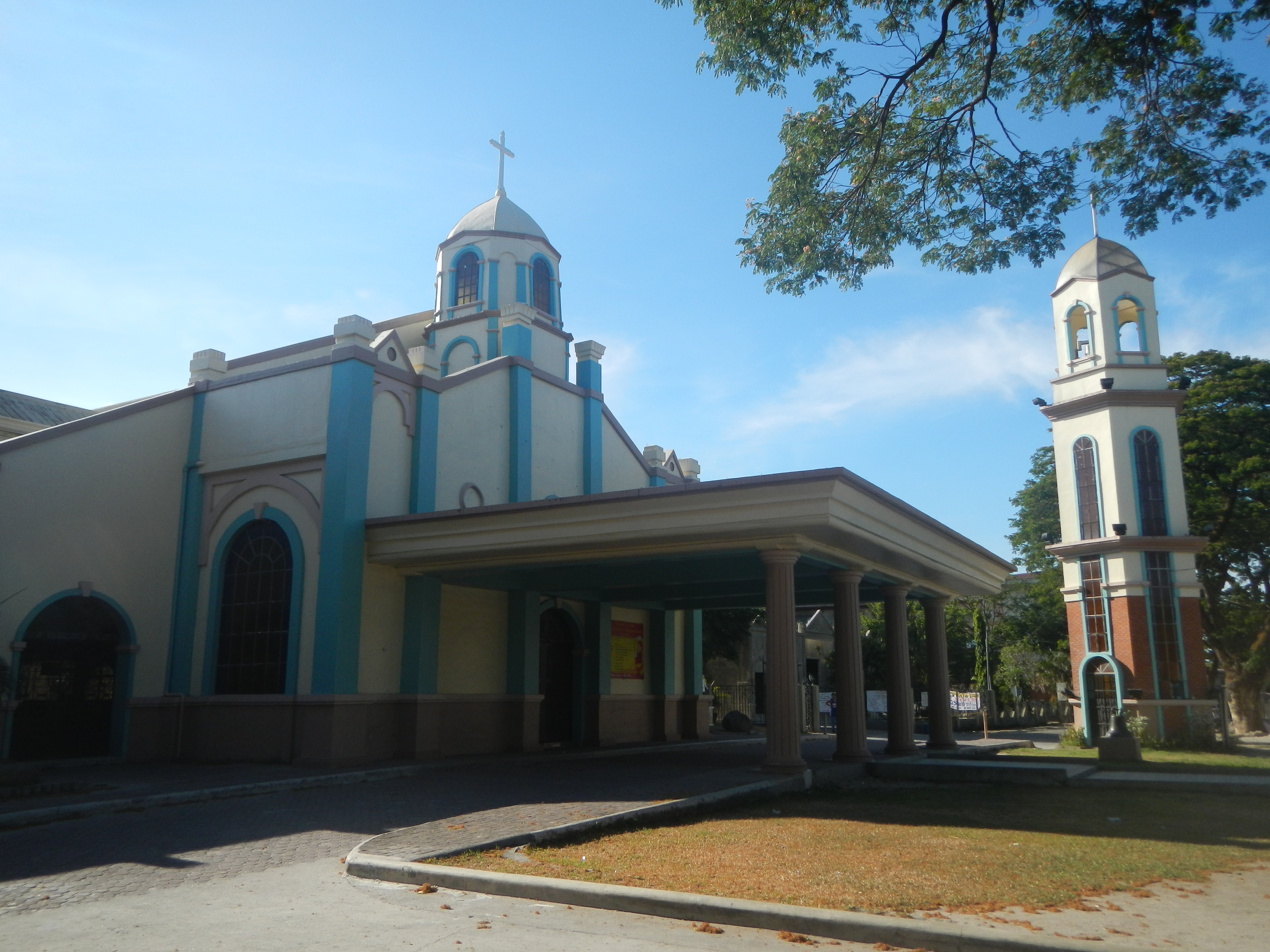
Santuario de San Nicolas de Tolentino of Capas church

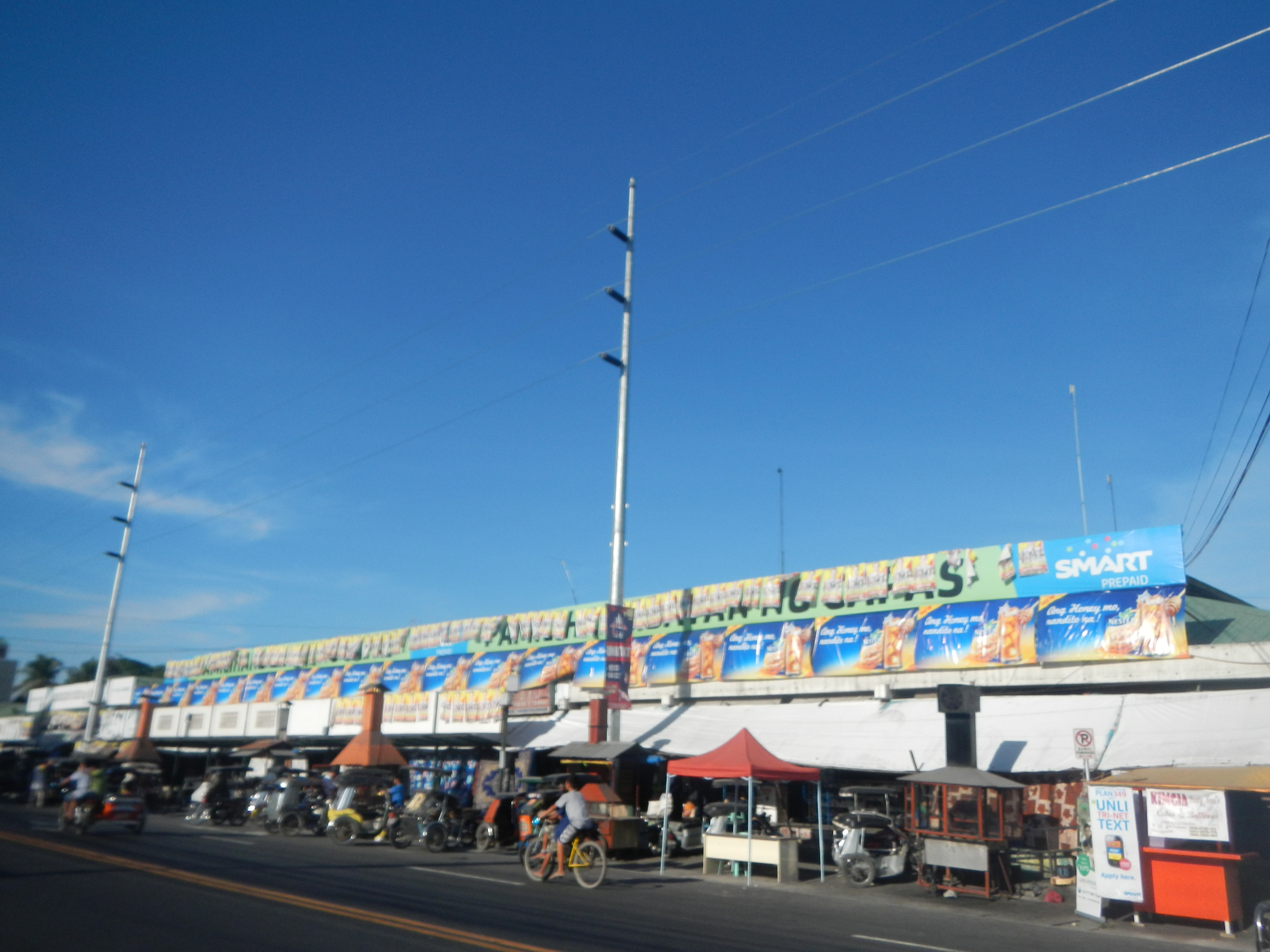
Public market

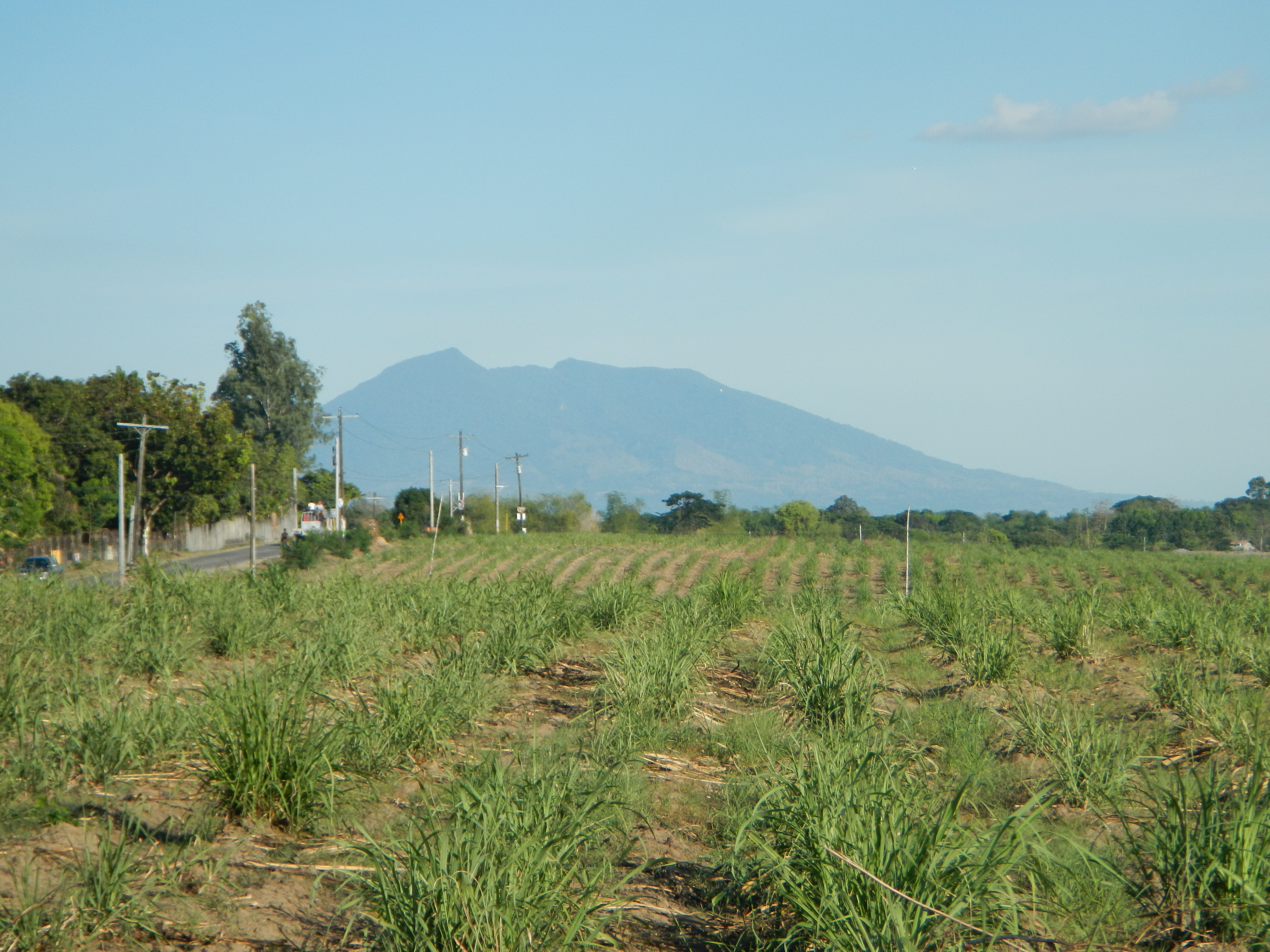
Mount Arayat as viewed from Capas fields

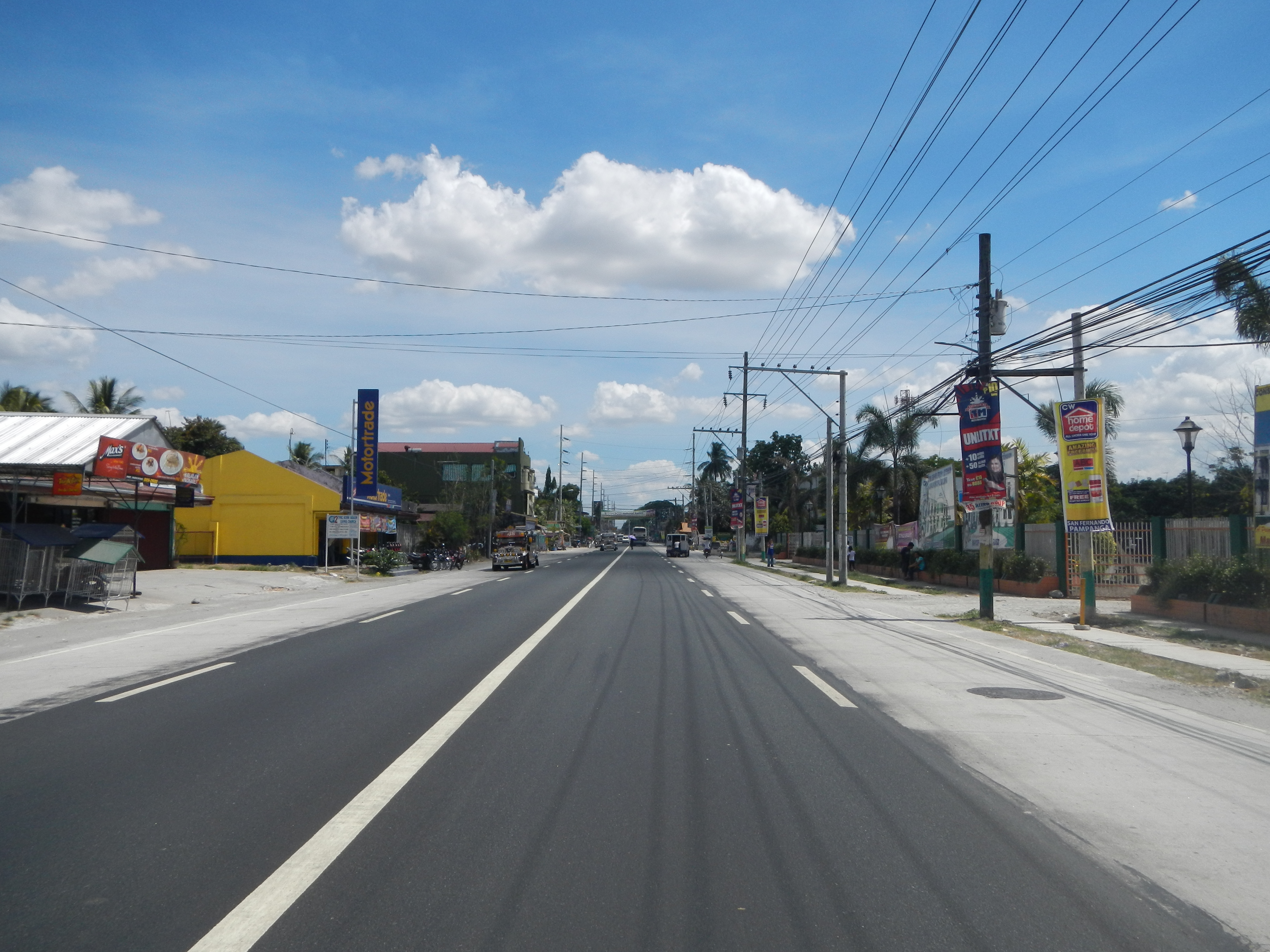
MacArthur Highway (N2) looking south, which serves as a main street of the town

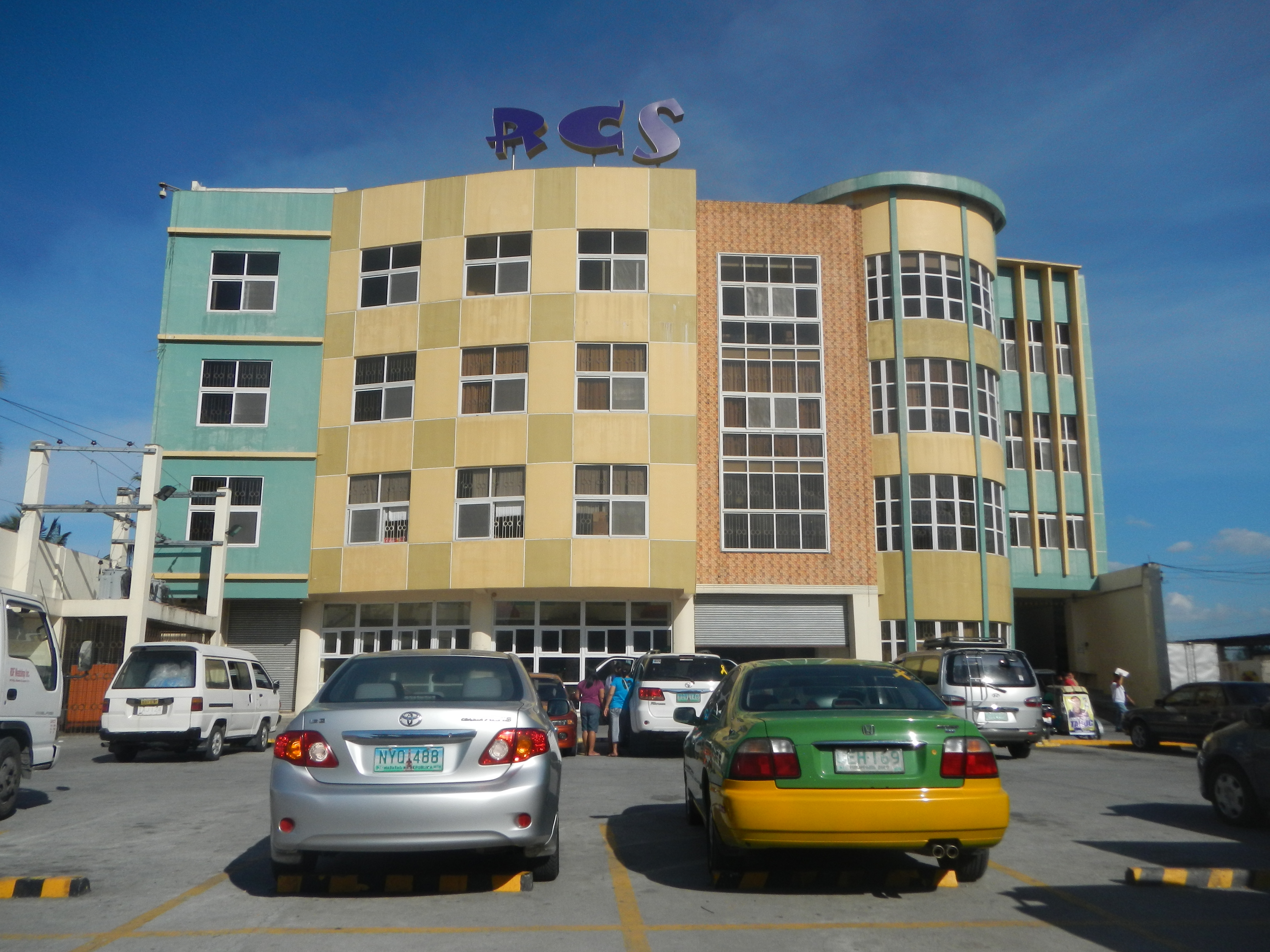
RCS supermarket
