= Jesli Lapus =

Filipino politician

The Honorable Jesli Lapus
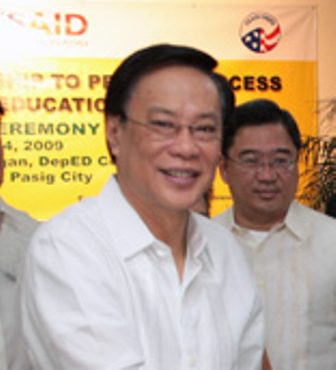

49th Secretary of the Philippine Department of Trade and Industry
- In office March 15, 2010 – June 30, 2010
- Preceded by: Peter Favila
- Succeeded by: Gregory Domingo

34th Secretary of the Philippine Department of Education
- In office October 4, 2006 – March 15, 2010
- President: Gloria Macapagal Arroyo
- Preceded by: Fe Hidalgo
- Succeeded by: Mona Valisno

Member of the Philippine House of Representatives from Tarlac's 3rd congressional district
- In office June 30, 1998 – October 4, 2006
- Preceded by: Herminio Aquino
- Succeeded by: Jeci Lapus

Undersecretary of Department of Agrarian Reform
- In office June 30, 1987 – September 9, 1989

Personal details
- Born: Jesli Aquino Lapus; September 12, 1949 (age 77) Tarlac City, Philippines
- Party: NPC (2001–present)
- Other political affiliations: Lakas (1998–2001)
- Parents: Jesus R. Lapus (father); Estrella S. Aquino (mother)
- Education: Philippine School of Business Administration
- Profession: Manager, academic

Jesli Aquino Lapus (born September 12, 1949) is a former Congressman of Tarlac, former Secretary of Education and uncle of President Benigno Aquino III.

== Early life and education ==
Lapus was born on September 12, 1949, in Tarlac City. He is the brother of Jeci Lapus. He attended the Little Flower Academy (Holy Spirit Academy) in Tarlac for his elementary and secondary education. In 1969, he earned a BS in accountancy from the Philippine School of Business Administration / St. Louis University in Baguio, finishing college in three years and subsequently passing the accountancy board exams. He obtained a master's degree in Business Management (MBM) from the Asian Institute of Management (AIM), graduating in 1973. In 1998, Lapus was conferred a doctorate in public administration (honoris causa) by the Polytechnic University of the Philippines (PUP).

Lapus also attended several post-graduate studies:

- Investment Appraisals and Management – Harvard University, United States of America (USA)
- Management of Transfer of Technology – INSEAD, France
- Project Management – BITS, Sweden
- Personal Financial Planning – University of California, Los Angeles (UCLA)

== Career ==
=== Private sector ===
The management career of Lapus started at a very young age. This earned for him the title, “Management Whiz Kid in the ASEAN,” given by Asian Finance international magazine. At 20, he worked as an auditor and consultant at SyCip, Gorres, Velayo & Company (SGV & Co.). He then became the chief financial officer (CFO) of the Ramcar Group of Companies at age 23. From 1979 to 1986, Lapus worked as managing director and chief operating officer (COO) of Triumph International (Philippines), Inc. He also worked in the banking sector, serving as director of Union Bank of the Philippines from 1988 to 1992.

Lapus was among the original core faculty members of AIM's Masters in Development Management program and has taught at the Ateneo de Manila University (ADMU) and Maryknoll College (now Miriam College). He has also conducted executive training courses in Indonesia and Malaysia.

- Auditor and consultant of Sycip, Gorres and Velayo (1969–1973)
- Vice president and chief finance officer of RAMCAR Inc. Group of Companies (1973–1979)
- Managing director and chief operating officer of Triumph International Philippines (1979–1986)
- Agrarian reform undersecretary of Department of Agrarian Reform (1987–1989)
- Director of Union Bank of the Philippines (1988–1992)
- President and chief executive officer of Pacific Products Inc. (1990–1992)
- President of Asia Pacific Rural and Agricultural Credit Association (1994–1995)
- President, chief executive officer, and vice chairman of the board of directors of Land Bank of the Philippines (1992–1998)

=== Executive branch of government ===
Lapus has served in the cabinets of three Philippine Presidents. From 1987 to 1989, he served as undersecretary of the Department of Agrarian Reform (DAR) under the administration of President Corazon C. Aquino. He established the Comprehensive Agrarian Reform Program (CARP) Fund and the Support Services Sector of DAR.

During the administration of President Fidel V. Ramos, Lapus served as president, chief executive officer (CEO), and vice chairman of the board of directors of Land Bank of the Philippines from 1992 to 1998.

Under President Gloria Macapagal Arroyo, Lapus was appointed Secretary of Education in 2006. In 2010, Lapus became the Secretary of Trade and Industry.

- Representative, 3rd district, Tarlac (1998–2007)
- Secretary, Department of Education (2006-2010)
- President, South East Asian Ministers of Education Organization (SEAMEO) (2006-2007)
- Executive Boardmember, UNESCO (2005-2006)
- Secretary, Department of Trade and Industry (2010)
- Independent Director in several listed companies in the Philippines (2010–present)

=== Committee memberships ===
- Chairman, Ways and Means Committee. Principal Author and Sponsor of the 2005 Fiscal Reforms Measures
- Chairman, Committee on Suffrage and Electoral Reforms. Principal Author and Sponsor of the Absentee Voting Law which fulfilled the 1987 Constitutional Provision for overseas electoral rights.
- Vice Chairman, Appropriations
- Accounts
- Housing and Urban Development
- Restoration
- Agrarian Reform
- Banks and Financial IntermediarieS
- Bases Conversion
- Dangerous Drugs
- Energy
- Legislative Franchises
- National Culture Communities
