= Andres Lacson =

Filipino politician (born 1976)

Andres D. Lacson

Mayor of Concepcion, Tarlac
- In office July 1, 2013 – June 30, 2022
- Vice mayor: Danilo David (2013–2019); Joey Baluyut (2019-2022)
- Preceded by: Noel L. Villanueva
- Succeeded by: Noel L. Villanueva

Vice Mayor of Concepcion, Tarlac
- In office July 1, 2004 – June 30, 2013

Member of the Sangguniang Bayan of Concepcion
- In office July 1, 1998 – June 30, 2001

Chairman of Sangguniang Kabataan of Barangay San Bartolome, Concepcion, Tarlac
- In office July 1, 1996 – June 30, 1998

Personal details
- Born: Andres David Lacson; November 30, 1976 (age 49)
- Party: PFP (2024–present)
- Other political affiliations: Aksyon (2021–2024); Independent (2018–2021, 2007–2009); NPC (1998–2007, 2015–2018); Nacionalista (2009–2015)
- Spouse: Jennifer Nicolas Lacson
- Education: Angeles University Foundation
- Profession: Politician

Andres "Andy" David Lacson (born November 30, 1976) is a Filipino politician. He was a mayor of Concepcion, Tarlac and former Vice Chairman of Aksyon Demokratiko.

== Early life and education ==
Lacson attended Concepcion Catholic School in his grade school and high school. He graduated from Angeles University Foundation with a Bachelor's degree in Business Administration, Major in Management and Entrepreneurship. He later pursued post graduate degrees in his alma mater, in Asian Institute of Management, and in the University of the Philippines.

In his youth, Lacson was a Youth Ambassador to China in 2005. On 2008, he was a Philippine delegate to the American Council of Young Political Leaders in Washington, D.C.

== Political career ==
Lacson began his political career as a youth leader when, at 19, he was elected Sanguniang Kabataan chairman. He was also a municipal councilor, and then a Vice Mayor of Concepcion. In 2013, he ran for Mayor of Concepcion and won. In August 2021, he was announced as the Vice Chairman of Aksyon Demokratiko, a major political party in the Philippines.

Lacson is the Provincial President of the Tarlac Chapter of the National Movement of Young Legislators. He is also a Board of Director of the Tarlac Chapter of the League of Municipalities of the Philippines. Before becoming mayor, he also served as an executive assistant to a congressional district office in Tarlac, and a member of the Metro Clark Advisory Council of Clark Development Corporation.

=== Mayor of Concepcion, Tarlac ===
On 2014, Lacson opens Concepcion for business despite lack of national government support. He said he has laid down the welcome carpet to big local and foreign businesses and industries to put itself at par with the more progressive urban areas of the province, like Tarlac City. On the 32nd death anniversary of Benigno “Ninoy” Aquino Jr., some people have suggested renaming his birthplace Concepcion after him. Some residents expressed belief that the passage of a law renaming Concepcion after Ninoy would be smoother with his son Noynoy Aquino being the president at that time. However, Lacson clarified that there is still no move to change the name of the town that was named after the Immaculate Conception. While the move to rename the town after Ninoy is not yet clear, Lacson noted that Concepcion is the first town in the Philippines to erect a monument honoring Ninoy. In October 2015, Lacson, together with Senator Bam Aquino and other Tarlac local officials, inaugurated the 101st Negosyo Center in Concepcion. Bam Aquino is the main author of Republic Act 10644, or the Go Negosyo Act, which mandates the creation of Negosyo Centers in all provinces, cities and municipalities in the country.

On 2016, Lacson earned his certificate in the Municipal Leadership and Governance Program of the Development Academy of the Philippines, which conducted the program in partnership with the Zuellig Family Foundation and the Department of Health. The program ran from January to March 2016. In his speech during the inauguration of a newly upgraded health center in Concepcion, Lacson recalled that when SM was applying for business permits to put up a Savemore facility in their town, in jest, told them that they could also help in the renovation of the health centers. Weeks after his joke, the inspection team of SM arrived and the renovation was started. On 2017, Lacson, along with the Department of Labor and Employment (DOLE) Tarlac officials, led the distribution of Negokarts and starter kits to recipients, who were various ambulant vendors and woman cosmetology TESDA graduates. The Negokarts are enhanced roving food cart businesses while the starter kits are start-up kits for cosmetology-related livelihood. The Negokart Project and Kabuhayan Starter Kits are livelihood flagship programs of DOLE. On the same year, Lacson signed the Manifesto of Support for the Build, Build, Build Program of Philippine president Rodrigo Duterte, along with the other leaders of Tarlac province, during the third leg of the Clark Development Stakeholders’ Roadshow held at the Widus Hotel in Clark Freeport Zone.

In January 2020, Lacson, along with other local government officials and administrators of the Tarlac State University (TSU), led the groundbreaking ceremony of the TSU Concepcion Extension Campus. The construction of the extension campus is considered a legacy project of Lacson where 75 million pesos from their local funds is budgeted and hopes to accommodate around 500 enrollees by 2021, its target year of operation.

==== International delegations ====
Since 2013, Lacson has served the municipality of Concepcion, Tarlac as mayor. However, he has also represented the country, in his capacity as Mayor, as a member of the Philippine delegation to the 2014 Australian Political Exchange Council Program. The delegation went on a seven-day visit to New South Wales, Canberra and Sydney to learn about Australia and its political system. Lacson returned the favor to the Australian delegates when they visited the Philippines in May 2014. He, along with former Cabinet Secretary Jose Rene Almendras, met the Australian delegation.

Lacson is also a part of the Philippine delegate to the Japan Investment Mission in 2016.

==== Use of technology ====
In October 2014, Lacson boasts that Concepcion is the first town in the Philippines to have drones, or unmanned aerial vehicles, to monitor the local peace and order situation and threats from natural disasters. Additionally, he said that they are building the most modern police station in the country because of its complete facilities.

In March 2016, Lacson and the Department of Trade and Industry (DTI) Tarlac signed a Memorandum of Agreement for the use of equipment to upgrade the production of meat products by local meat makers. During the turnover ceremony of the set of new equipment provided by DTI Region III to meat processors from Concepcion, Lacson expressed his gratitude for partnering with the local government of Concepcion as the cooperator of the Shared Service Facility provided by the DTI. In April 2017, Lacson entered into a Memorandum of Agreement with the Department of Information and Communications Technology (DICT) to cooperate with DICT's Free Wi-fi Access in Public Places Project. The project aims to provide free Wi-Fi internet access in public places nationwide. In October 2018, in a public hearing conducted by the Environmental Management Bureau of the Department of Environment and Natural Resources, Lacson endorsed the proposed project of a scrap recycling mini-mill by SteelAsia Manufacturing Corporation.

In June 2020, Lacson launched his own mobile app.

==== Campaign against illegal drugs ====
On July 17, 2017, Lacson received a special commendation from the Philippine Drug Enforcement Agency (PDEA) Region 3 for his support to the government's campaign against illegal drugs. The PDEA commendation came after the local police arrested three barangay councilors and two municipal employees for their involvement in illegal drugs. However, on October of the same year, the Department of the Interior and Local Government (DILG) issued a resolution accusing Lacson of being engaged in illegal drug trade or activity, along with a provincial governor and 22 other city and municipal mayors, stripping them of power through the National Police Commission (NAPOLCOM). Lacson denies the resolution and challenged the DILG and NAPOLCOM to show proof. The local council including the association of barangay captains have expressed their support through a resolution in favor of Lacson.

==== Other administrative issues ====
In January 2019, the Office of the Ombudsman reinstated Lacson after it set aside his 6-month suspension over two administrative complaints that have been dismissed. The Ombudsman ruled that the charges of abuse of authority and oppression filed by municipal employee Joy Anne Lorenzo against Lacson “lacked merit.” The Ombudsman also dismissed three other administrative cases and four criminal cases filed by Lorenzo against Lacson. Lorenzo filed an appeal to the Court of Appeals alleging that the Ombudsman committed grave abuse of discretion when it dismissed her administrative complaints against Lacson. For lack of substantial evidence, the Court of Appeals denied the appeal in October 2019. Lorenzo petitioned to the Supreme Court to which, in June 2020, the Court denied and instead, affirmed the decision and resolution issued by the Court of Appeals.

==== COVID-19 response ====
In April 2020, Lacson has prohibited residents of all the town's 45 barangays to go to the public market, supermarkets, and grocery stores to get necessary and essential goods. He has ordered the municipal police manning checkpoints and control points to allow only business persons engaged in “rolling stores” and vendors or stall renters at the town's public market. He said that the new shopping rule had to be implemented after several persons, including the municipal treasurer, were tested positive. In July 2020, the local government of Concepcion, Tarlac has placed the town under total lockdown for three days. Lacson said that the local government will conduct contact tracing during the lockdown period. In March 2021, Lacson tested positive for COVID-19 virus. Before he contracted the virus, he was recently criticized for promoting an open-air food park and using face masks in public with an exhalation valve.

== Personal life ==
Lacson and his spouse Jennifer are parents to their five children namely, Jennah Andrea, Andres David, Nicole Andrea, Anjela, and Maria Andriana.
