= Concepcion, Tarlac =

Municipality in Tarlac, Philippines

Concepcion
- Municipality
- Municipality of Concepcion
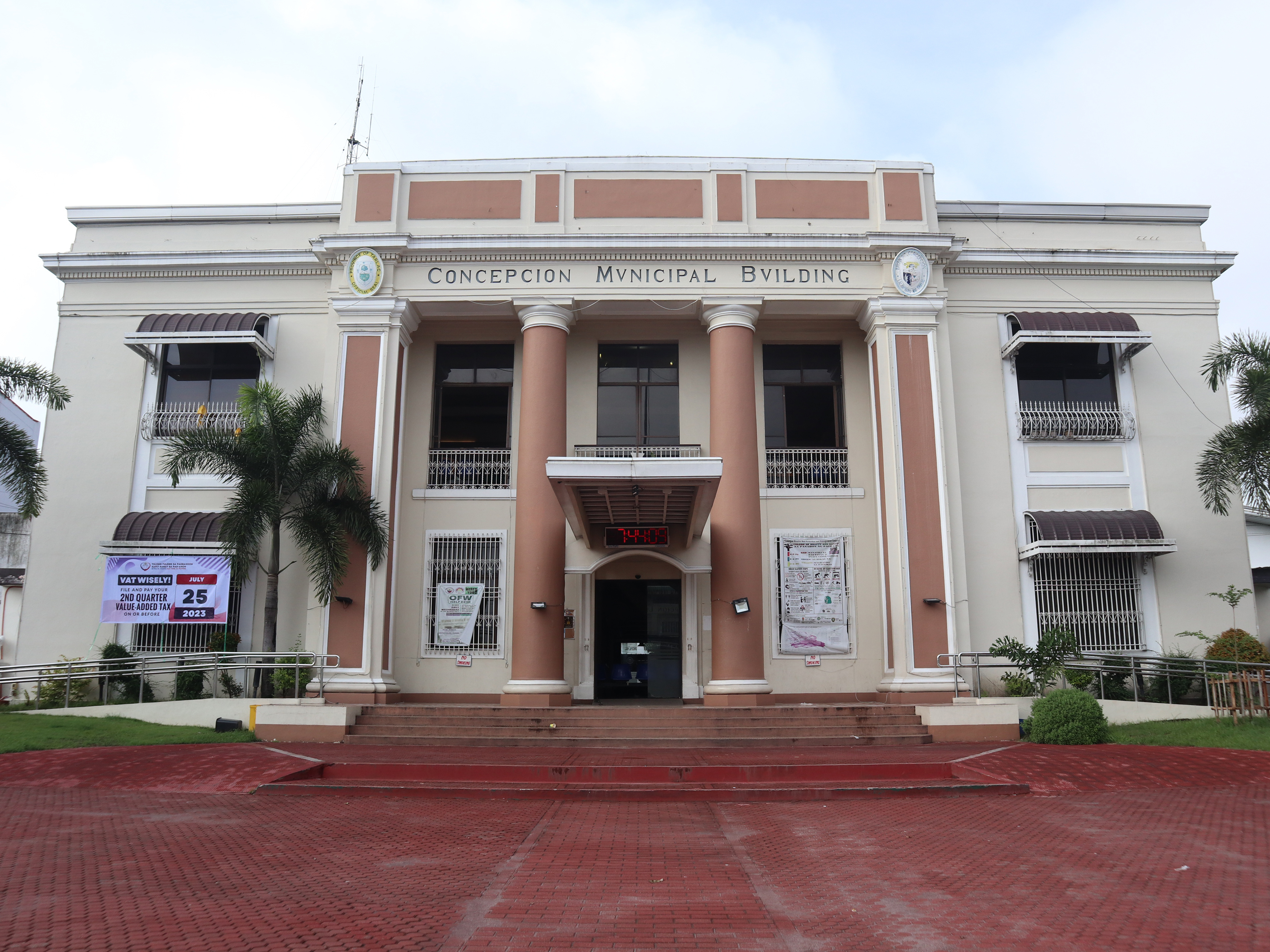
- Concepcion Municipal Hall

- Flag Seal
- Nickname: The Birthplace of Ninoy Aquino
- Motto: "Concepcion, Bayan ko, Luv Ko 'to"
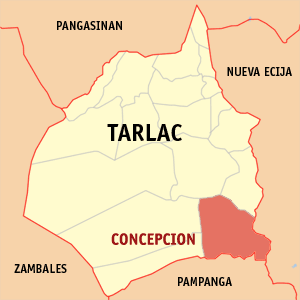
- Map of Tarlac with Concepcion highlighted
- Interactive map of Concepcion
- Location within the Philippines
- Coordinates: 15°19′29″N 120°39′19″E
- Country: Philippines
- Region: Central Luzon
- Province: Tarlac
- District: 3rd district
- Founded: 1863
- Barangays: 45 (see Barangays)

Government
  - Type: Sangguniang Bayan
  - Mayor: Noel Lopez Villanueva
  - Vice Mayor: Evelyn A. Rivera
  - Representative: Noel N. Rivera
  - Municipal Council: Members: Jose Carlo M. Avena; Joey L. Baluyut; Erroll John Stephen C. Bucu; Mary Krissein M. Gomez; Jayson E. Lagman; Marvin P. Macalino; Nicole Jane D. Santos; Erwin James S. Villanueva
  - Electorate: 112,534 voters (2025)

Area
  - Total: 242.99 km^{2} (93.82 sq mi)
- Elevation: 36 m (118 ft)
- Highest elevation: 73 m (240 ft)
- Lowest elevation: 21 m (69 ft)

Population (2024 census)
  - Total: 178,549
  - Density: 734.80/km^{2} (1,903.1/sq mi)
  - Households: 38,117

Economy
  - Income class: 1st municipal income class
  - Poverty incidence: 13.3% (2023)
  - Revenue: ₱ 669.6 million (2024)
  - Assets: ₱ 1,951 million (2024)
  - Expenditure: ₱ 610.5 million (2024)
  - Liabilities: ₱ 901.1 million (2024)

Service provider
  - Electricity: Tarlac 2 Electric Cooperative (TARELCO 2)
- Time zone: UTC+8 (PST)
- ZIP code: 2316
- PSGC: 0306905000
- IDD : area code: +63 (0)45
- Native languages: Kapampangan; Tagalog; Ilocano
- Website: www.concepciontarlac.gov.ph

Seal of the Local Government Unit of Concepcion, Tarlac, Philippines

Concepcion, officially the Municipality of Concepcion (Kapampangan: Balen ning Concepcion; Filipino: Bayan ng Concepcion), is a municipality in the province of Tarlac, Philippines. According to the 2024 census, it has a population of 178,549 people.

== History ==
=== Spanish colonial era ===
In 1860, the towns of Concepcion and Magalang comprised a single town named San Bartolome (presently a barangay of Concepcion), which was a military Commandancia of Pampanga under the Spanish regime.

In 1863, a catastrophic flood devastated the whole town of San Bartolome, giving birth to the towns of Concepcion and Magalang. The residents were left with no other choice but to abandon the place. Divided as to where they were to resettle, some went north and others went south. The first group, headed by Don Pablo Luciano, the gobernadorcillo, organized a new settlement on the slopes of Mount Arayat further south and named the settlement after him. Eventually, the place was renamed Magalang. The second group who took refuge in the north comprised the Santoses, Laxamanas, Salvadors, Yumuls, Castros, Dizons, Pinedas, Felicianos, Aquinos, Corteses, Bermudezes, Perezes, Punsalangs and many others, and settled in a place (now called Santo Nino) then occupied by the Lindos and the Amuraos (Don Esquolastiquo Amurao and Don Gaston Amurao).

Most of the settlers became dissatisfied with the place, as it abounded with snakes and was scarce in water. They moved further south to a place now known as Concepcion. The settlers began clearing the land and built huts and roads. After several years, they named the place Concepcion after the Immaculate Conception, who was believed to possess power over the snakes that abound in the area.

By 1897, the Katipunan was organized under General Servillano Aquino, and in 1898–1900, Moises Castro was elected as the first municipal president under the short-lived Philippine Republic led by General Emilio Aguinaldo. In 1900, General Servillano Aquino was captured by the Americans and sentenced to hang, but in 1904, he was pardoned by order of the President of the United States, Theodore Roosevelt. The First American government in town was established in 1902 by Captain Smith, who appointed Don Marciano Barrera as the first Filipino President.

=== American colonial era ===
The town saw progress with the construction of the Gabaldon School building in 1911, costing fifty thousand pesos, but in 1918 an influenza epidemic killed people by the hundreds. By 1929, the municipal building and two bandstands were constructed, and in 1935 the Commonwealth government was installed with Don Gregorio Palma as municipal president. The town plaza, costing twenty thousand pesos, was fenced and named Don Benigno Q. Aquino Sr. Memorial Park in 1939.

=== Japanese occupation ===
During World War II, Japanese occupation began in 1942 with military garrisons stationed in the town, marked by brutalities and killings. From 1942–1944, guerrillas and Hukbalahap communist fighters aided the Philippine Commonwealth Army in battles against the Japanese. On December 27, 1944, Japanese forces left the town, with the Hukbalahap taking over until January 1945. Between January and August 1945, Filipino and American ground troops liberated the town, reestablishing the Commonwealth government. On Independence Day 1946, General Servillano Aquino and Reymundo Panlilio hoisted the Philippine flag in a solemn ceremony at Benigno Aquino Memorial Park.

=== Post-war era ===
Education and civic institutions followed: Benigno Aquino Memorial High School was established in 1948, a municipal library in 1952, and later, Ninoy Aquino’s political career began in 1955 when he became Concepcion’s youngest mayor at 22. Through the years, school districts expanded (1962–1971), and infrastructure such as the Concepcion Emergency Hospital in 1972 and Lucong Bridge in 1974 was developed. Civic organizations including the Concepcion Jaycees, Concepcion Educational Foundation, and Rotary Club of Southern Tarlac emerged between 1977–1979.

The 1980s marked significant developments: Concepcion Water District was established in 1980, Tarlac II Electric Cooperative in 1981, and Barangay San Nicolas Balas became the first barangay powered by TARELCO II in 1983. But this period was also marked by tragedy, with the assassination of Benigno “Ninoy” Aquino in 1983. The EDSA Revolution of 1986 made Corazon Aquino president, and Concepcion honored Ninoy with a bronze statue in 1987.

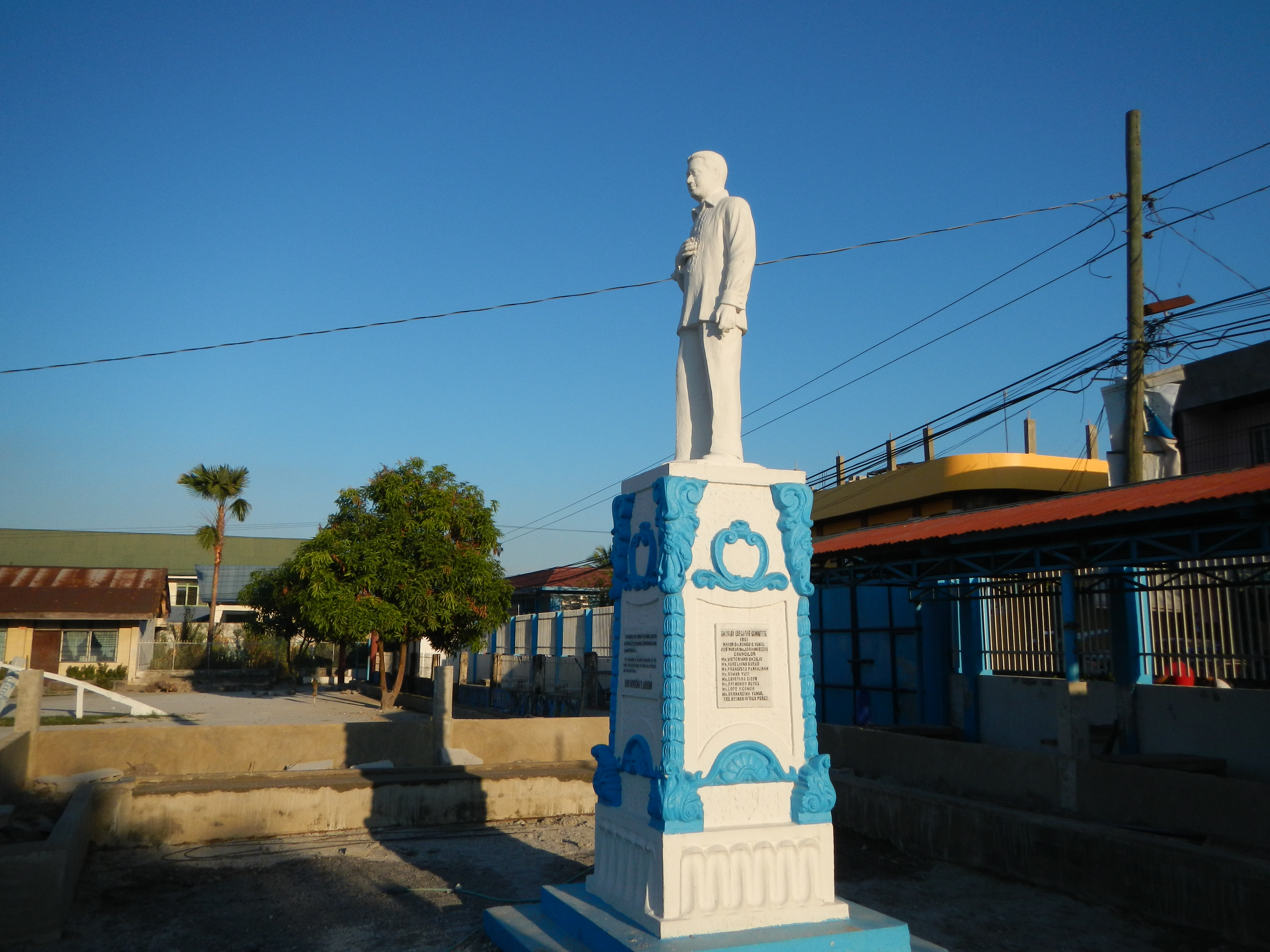
Benigno Simeon "Igno" Aquino, Sr. (September 4, 1894 – December 20, 1947), also known as Benigno S. Aquino or Benigno Aquino Sr., was a Filipino politician who served as Speaker of the National Assembly of the Second Philippine Republic from 1943 to 1944. His grandson Benigno S. Aquino III is the former president of the Philippines. He is also the father of former senator Ninoy Aquino.

Natural calamities struck in 1990 with the Luzon earthquake and again in 1991 with the Mount Pinatubo eruption and devastating lahar flows. Evacuees were resettled in Camp O’Donnell in 1992. Infrastructure and institutions grew through the 1990s with the establishment of Kabalikat Civicom in 1993, the Concepcion Training Center in 1993, and the renaming of Aquino Memorial High School to Benigno S. Aquino National High School in 1994.

=== Contemporary ===
Into the 2000s, leadership shifted with mayors Benjamin Lacson, Noel L. Villanueva, and Andres D. Lacson, while infrastructure such as the Concepcion Legislative Building, Parua River Bridge, and renovated public market were completed. Cultural pride was highlighted in 2008 when Concepcion joined the Belenismo ng Tarlac competition, coinciding with its 145th Foundation Day.

From 2010 onward, more schools, malls, and banks marked economic growth: Caluluan High School’s grand alumni homecoming in 2010, SM Savemore and Walter Mart opening in 2017, Puregold in 2017, and BPI in 2018, signaling a commerce and trade boom. Political leadership continued with re-elections and transitions, with Mayor Andres D. Lacson re-elected in 2019 and Mayor Noel L. Villanueva elected in 2022.

== Geography ==
Concepcion is one of the largest municipalities of the province of Tarlac. It lies on the south-eastern tip of Tarlac, bordered to the south by Magalang, to the east by San Antonio, to the north-east by La Paz, to the north-west by Tarlac City, to the west by Capas, and to the south-west by Bamban. It covers an area of 245.7 square kilometres (94.9 sq mi). It is 35 kilometres (22 mi) from Tarlac City and 159 kilometres (99 mi) from Manila.

It has two great rivers, the first being Lucong River which originates from Dingding and Namria creeks in Capas; it is visible from the bridge at Barangay Santiago, and merges with the Rio Chico before joining the Pampanga River. The second is Parua River, which originates from the Sacobia-Bamban river that comes from Mount Pinatubo. Parua River is heavily silted with 7 m (23 ft) of sand deposits; its bridge was destroyed by lahar and is visible at Barangay San Nicolas Balas. It also merges with the Rio Chico before joining Pampanga River. Both rivers are utilized to irrigate the town's agricultural lands, consisting mainly of rice and sugar crops. Parua River, which at times appears as a bed of sand due to the scarcity of water, is also a quarry site for sand and ash used as construction material.

=== Barangays ===
Concepcion is politically subdivided into 45 barangays, as shown below. Each barangay consists of puroks and some have sitios.

- Alfonso
- Balutu
- Cafe
- Calius Gueco
- Caluluan
- Castillo
- Corazon de Jesus (Darabulbul)
- Culatingan
- Dungan
- Dutung-A-Matas (Jefmin)
- Green Village
- Lilibangan
- Mabilog
- Magao
- Malupa
- Minane
- Panalicsian (Panalicsican)
- Pando
- Parang
- Parulung
- Pitabunan
- San Antonio
- San Agustin (Murcia)
- San Bartolome (Balen a Melacuan)
- San Francisco
- San Isidro (Almendras)
- San Jose (Poblacion)
- San Juan (Castro)
- San Martin
- San Nicolas (Poblacion)
- San Nicolas Balas
- San Vicente (Calius/Corba)
- Santa Cruz
- Santa Maria
- Santa Monica
- Santa Rita
- Santa Rosa (Bucsit)
- Santiago
- Santo Cristo
- Santo Niño
- Santo Rosario (Magunting)
- Talimunduc Marimla
- Talimunduc San Miguel
- Telabanca
- Tinang

=== Climate ===
Climate data for Concepcion, Tarlac
Month	Jan	Feb	Mar	Apr	May	Jun	Jul	Aug	Sep	Oct	Nov	Dec	Year
Mean daily maximum °C (°F)	30 (86)	31 (88)	33 (91)	34 (93)	33 (91)	31 (88)	29 (84)	29 (84)	29 (84)	30 (86)	30 (86)	29 (84)	31 (87)
Mean daily minimum °C (°F)	19 (66)	19 (66)	20 (68)	22 (72)	24 (75)	24 (75)	24 (75)	24 (75)	24 (75)	22 (72)	21 (70)	20 (68)	22 (71)
Average precipitation mm (inches)	5 (0.2)	5 (0.2)	10 (0.4)	23 (0.9)	136 (5.4)	191 (7.5)	245 (9.6)	241 (9.5)	200 (7.9)	108 (4.3)	36 (1.4)	12 (0.5)	1,212 (47.8)
Average rainy days	2.6	2.5	4.4	8.3	20.9	24.4	27.4	26.9	25.0	18.2	9.2	3.6	173.4
Source: Meteoblue (modeled/calculated data, not measured locally)

== Demographics ==
Population census of Concepcion
Year	Pop.	±% p.a.
1903	12,962	—
1918	17,487	+2.02%
1939	32,702	+3.03%
1948	30,785	−0.67%
1960	45,084	+3.23%
1970	62,227	+3.27%
1975	72,554	+3.13%
1980	80,647	+2.14%
1990	103,146	+2.49%
1995	101,243	−0.35%
2000	115,171	+2.80%
2007	135,213	+2.24%
2010	139,832	+1.23%
2015	154,188	+1.88%
2020	169,953	+2.07%
2024	178,549	+1.19%
Source: Philippine Statistics Authority

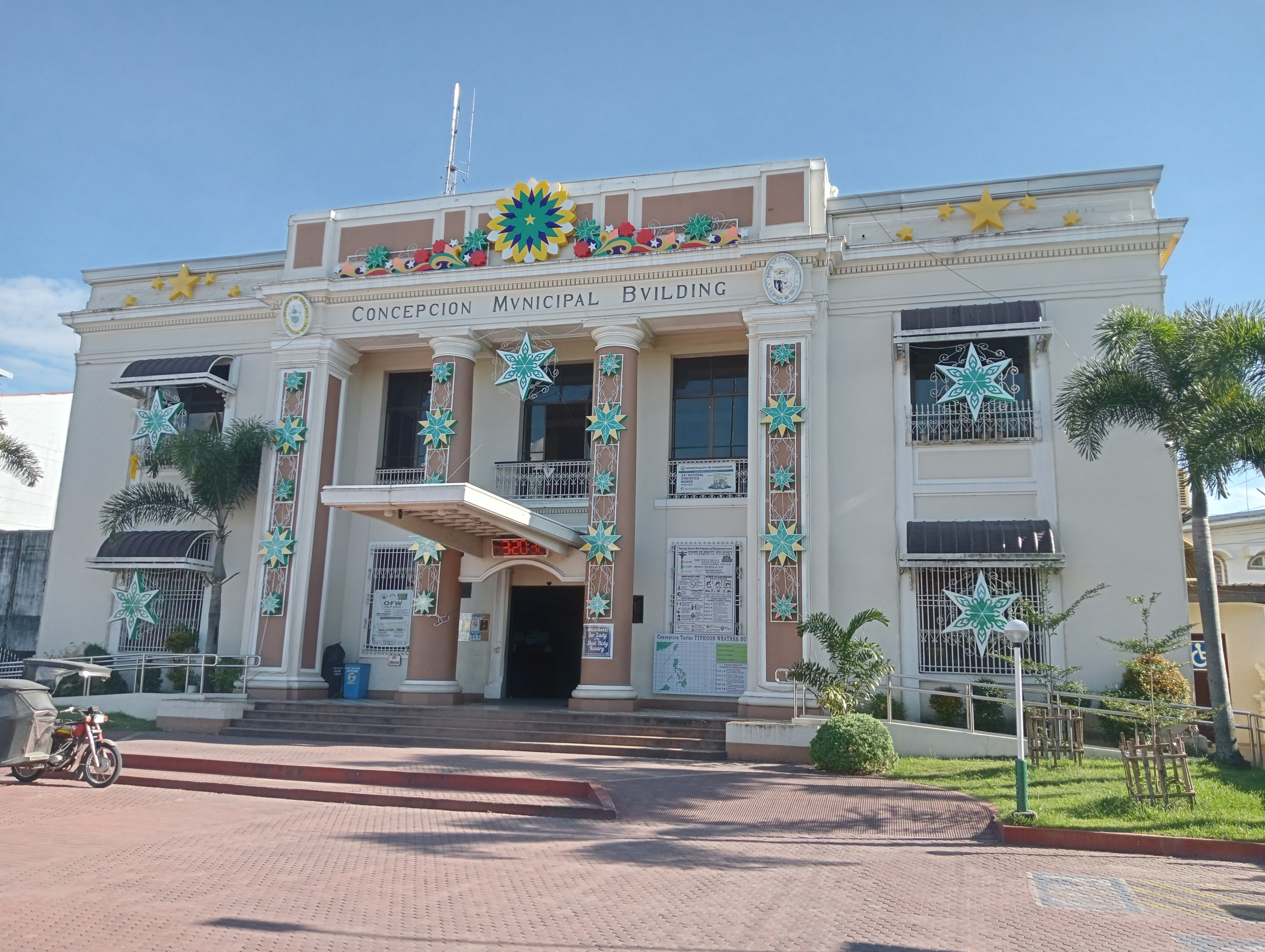
Concepcion Municipal Building

In the 2024 census, the population of Concepcion was 178,549 people, with a density of 730 inhabitants per square kilometre or 1,900 inhabitants per square mile.

== Economy ==
Poverty incidence of Concepcion (%)

Source: Philippine Statistics Authority

== Tourism ==
- Aquino Family Ancestral House – The marker was unveiled by President Aquino, III on September 10, 2011. (Ancestral houses of the Philippines).
- Santuario de la Immaculada Concepción (formerly Immaculate Conception Parish Church) belongs to the Roman Catholic Diocese of Tarlac (Latin: Dioecesis Tarlacensis) under the current bishop, Florentino Ferrer Cinense, appointed in 1988, and under the Vicariate of the Immaculate Conception, Vicar Forane: Msgr. Tirso Daquigan, Parish Priest, Titular: Immaculate Conception, Feast day, December 8). Fr. Melvin P. Castro, Chancellor.
- Col. Jesus R. Lapus Memorial Sports Complex
- Ninoy Aquino Monument (bronze statue)
- Concepcion Municipal Hall (depicted on the back of the 500-peso bill)
- Orchard Valley Resort
- Voice of America Relay Station (also used by the Philippine Broadcasting Service for shortwave station DZRP Radyo Pilipinas World Service)
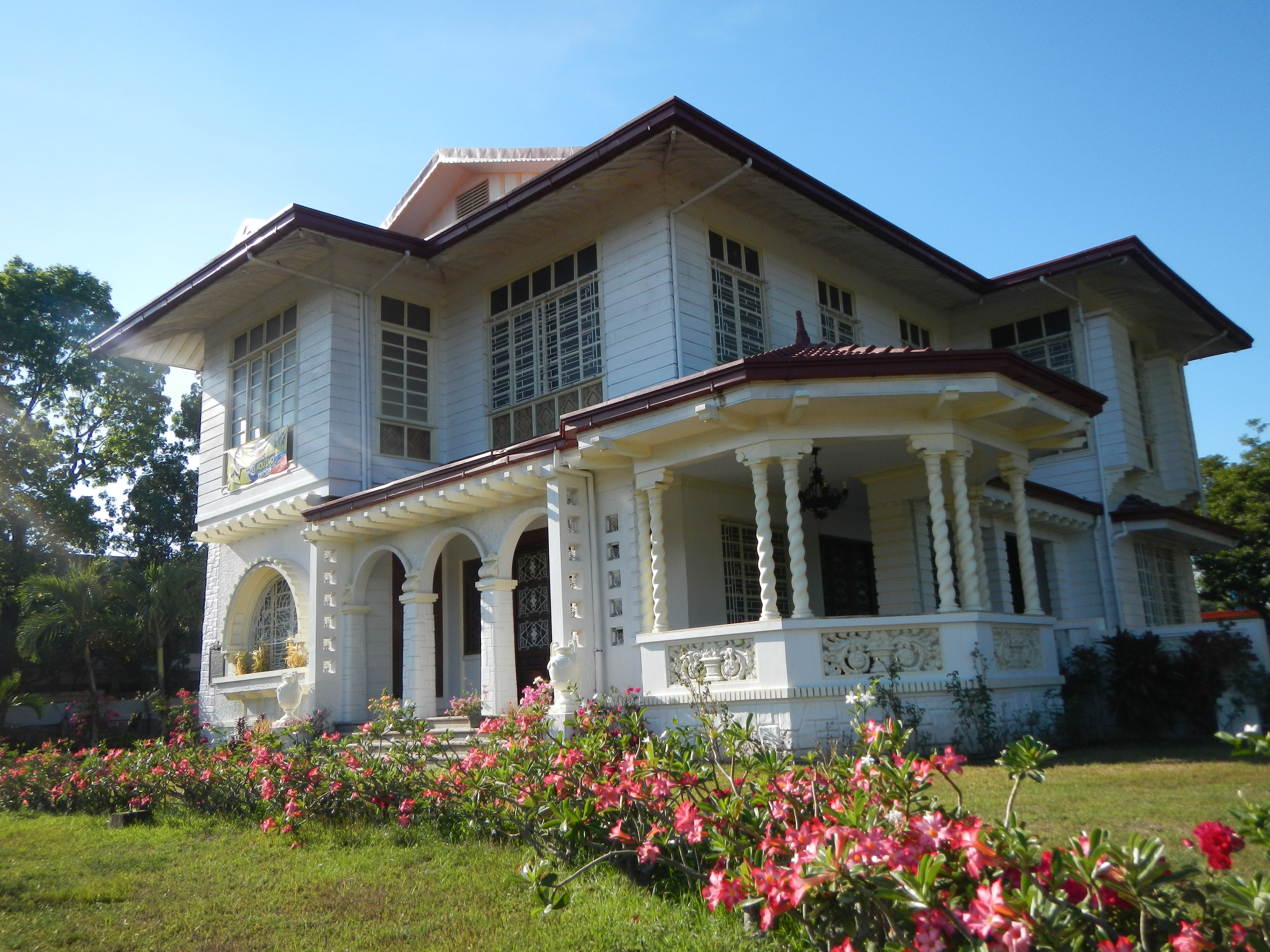
Aquino Family Ancestral House

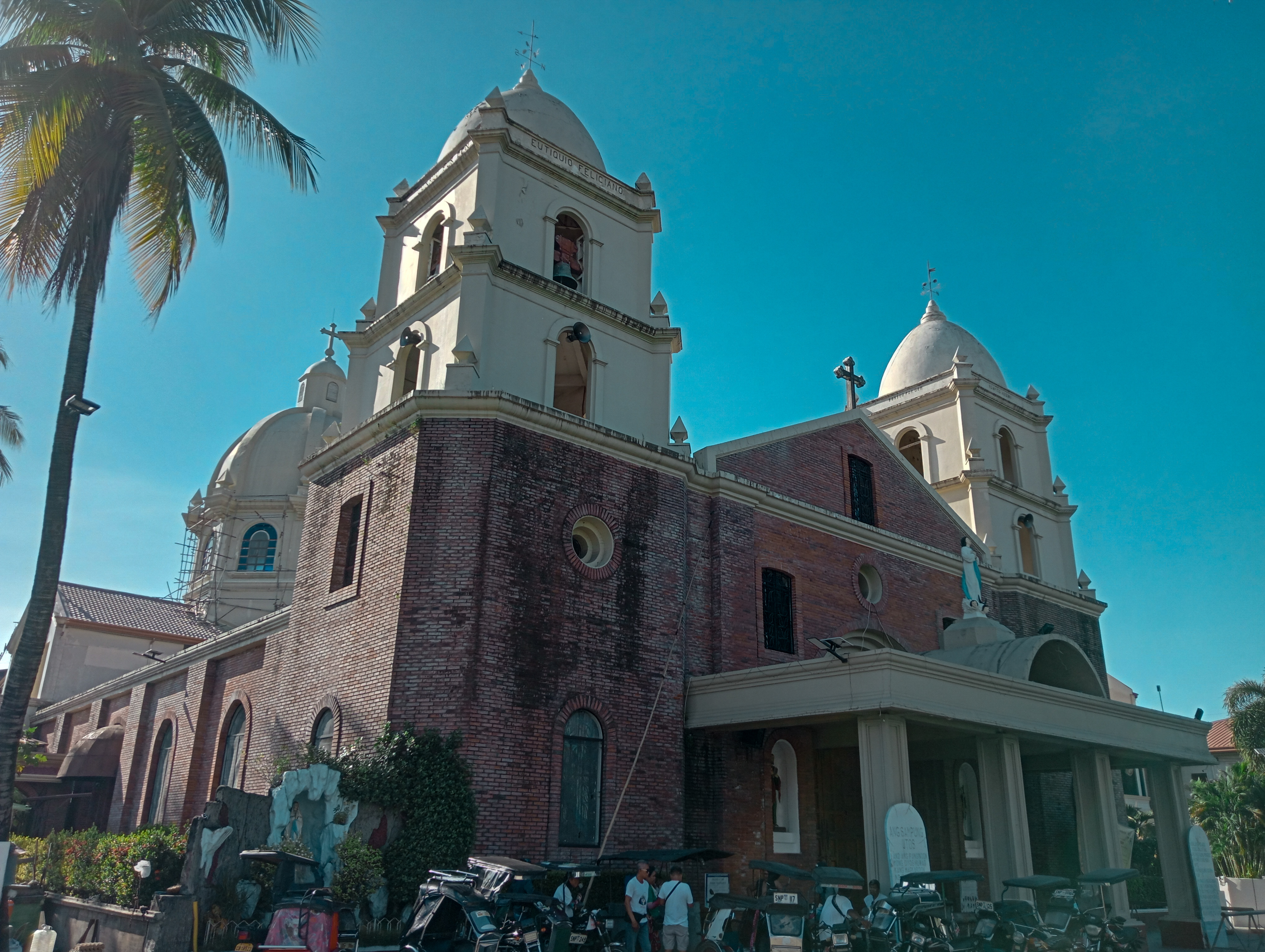
Immaculate Conception Parish Church

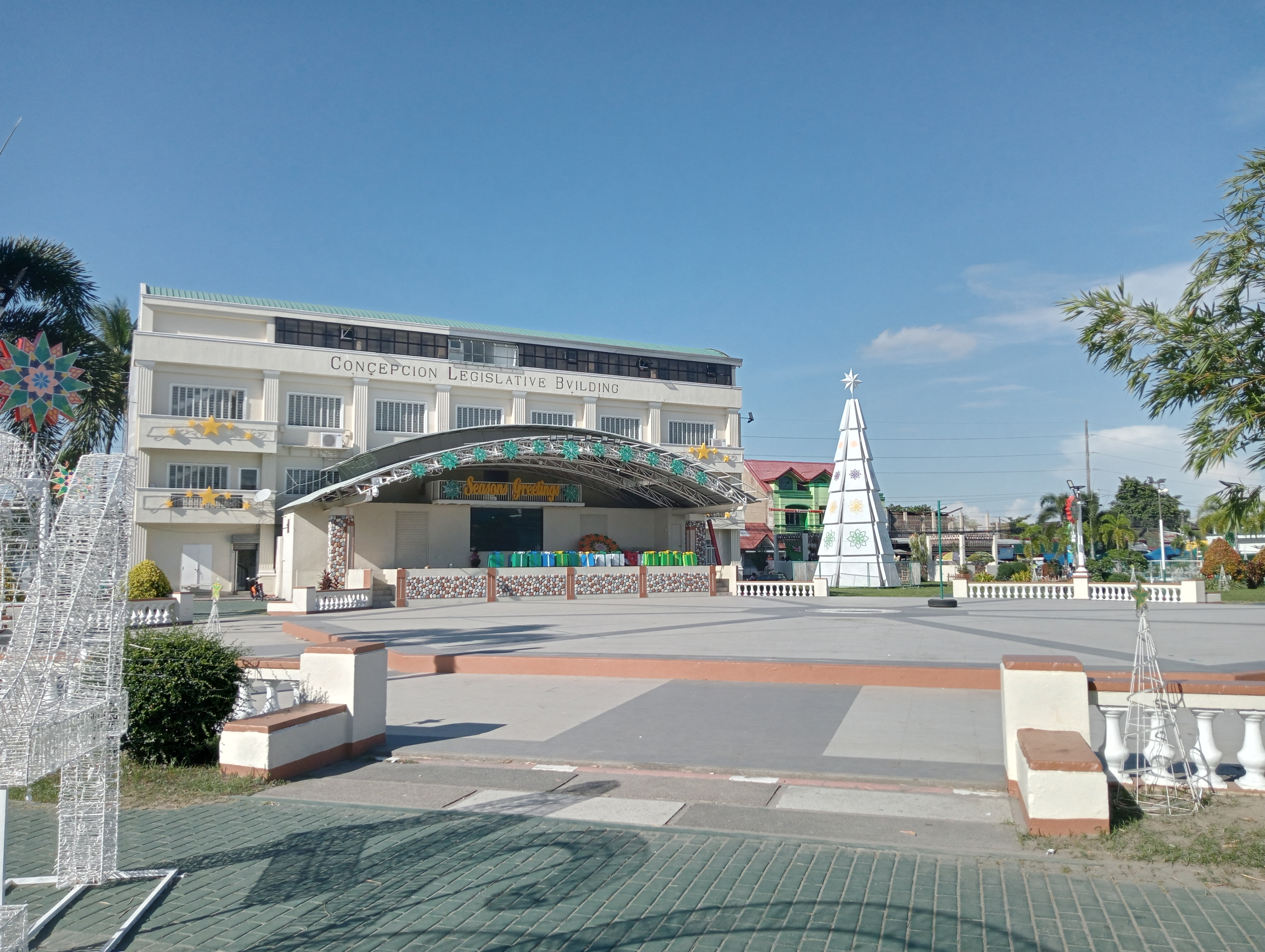
Benigno S. Aquino Memorial Plaza

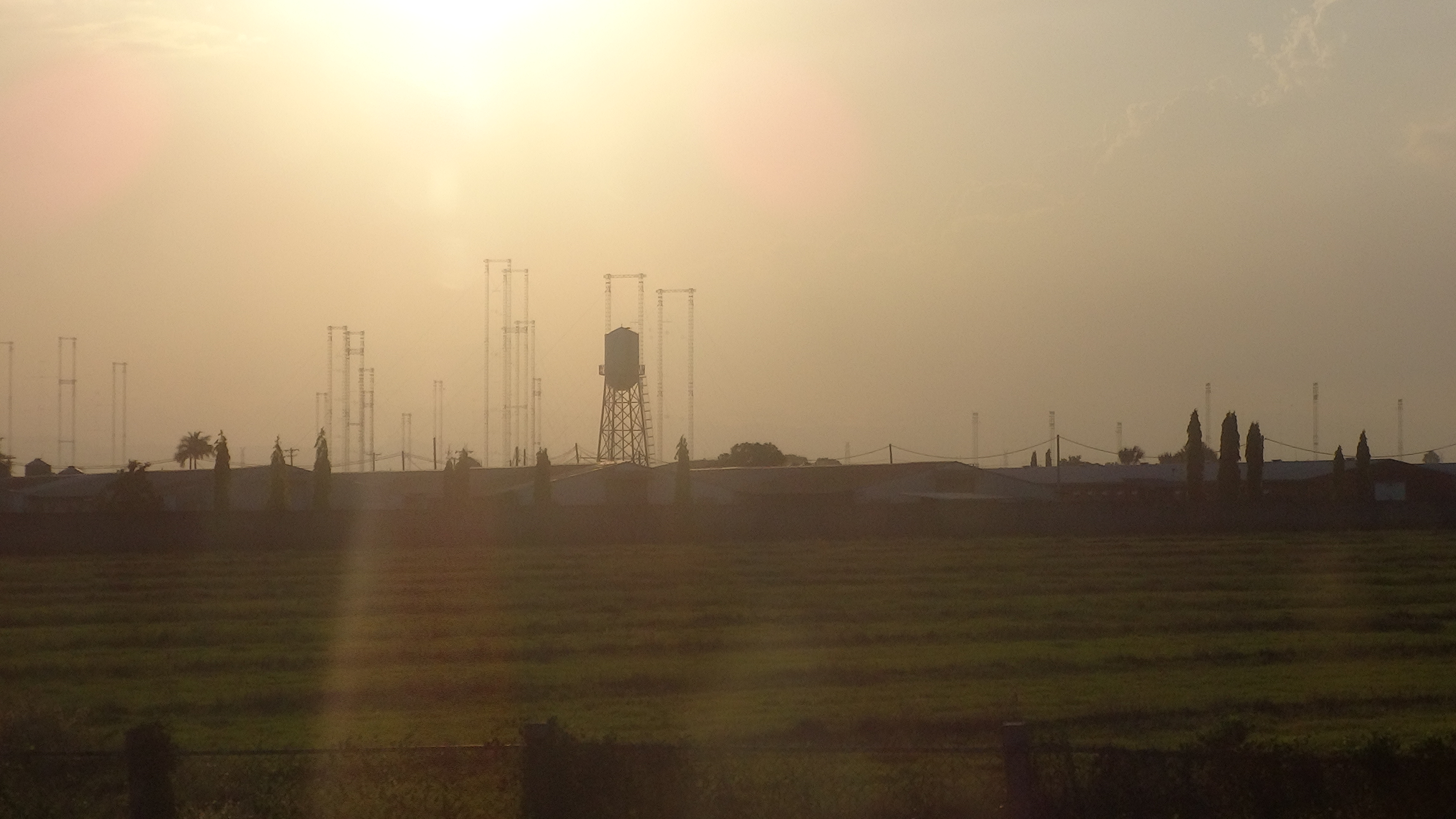
Voice of America relay station at Barangay Tinang, as seen from SCTEX

== Education ==
There are four schools district offices which govern all educational institutions within the municipality. They oversee the management and operations of all private and public, from primary to secondary schools. These are Concepcion East Schools District Office, Concepcion North Schools District Office, Concepcion South Schools District Office, and Concepcion West Schools District Office.

=== Primary and elementary schools ===
- Alfonso Elementary School
- Almendras Elementary School
- Aurora Aquino Elementary School
- Balutu Elementary School
- Cafe Elementary School
- Calius-Gueco Elementary School
- Castillo Elementary School
- Concepcion Bible Baptist Church Academy
- Concepcion Catholic School
- Concepcion East Central School
- Concepcion Ecumenical School
- Concepcion Jesus Light Academy
- Concepcion Little Angels School
- Concepcion North Central Elementary School
- Concepcion West Central Elementary School
- Concepcion South Elementary School
- Concepcion Special Education Center
- Coral Cambing Elementary School
- Culatingan Elementary School
- Dungan Elementary School
- Good Shepherd Christian School
- Green Village Elementary School
- Growing Kids Childminding Center
- Jefmin Elementary School
- Ligaya Elementary School
- Lilibangan Elementary School
- Living Stones Christian Academy
- Lourdes Elementary School
- Mabilog Elementary School
- Macabacle Elementary School
- Macangcong Elementary School
- Magao Elementary School
- Magunting Elementary School
- Malupa Elementary School
- Marimla Elementary School
- Minane Elementary School
- Montesun School
- Panalicsican Elementary School
- Pao Elementary School
- Parang Elementary School
- Parulung Elementary School
- Pitabunan Elementary School
- San Agustin Elementary School
- San Antonio Elementary School
- San Bartolome Elementary School
- San Francisco Elementary School
- San Jose Elementary School
- San Juan De Castro Elementary School
- San Miguel Elementary School
- San Nicolas Balas Elementary School
- San Vicente Calius Elementary School
- San Vicente Corba Elementary School
- Sta. Cruz Elementary School
- Sta. Maria Elementary School
- Sta. Monica Elementary School
- Sto. Cristo Elementary School
- Sto. Nino Elementary School
- Talimundoc SM Elementary School
- Tinang Elementary School
- The Rosefield Children's House
- Young Believers of Christian Faith School

=== Secondary schools ===
- Anastacio G. Yumul High School (formerly Balutu National High School)
- Benigno S. Aquino National High School
- Caluluan National High School
- Caluluan National High School (Annex)
- Precious High Academy
- Santa Rosa National High School
- Sta. Rosa Integrated School
- Sta. Rosa Integrated School (Steady Ready Street)
- Concepcion Catholic School

=== Higher education institution ===
- Concepcion Holy Cross College
- Tarlac State University Concepcion Campus

== Notable personalities ==
- Ninoy Aquino (from Barangay San Jose Pob.) – the youngest municipal mayor of Concepcion (1955–1959); subsequently the youngest governor of the Tarlac province, a Philippine senator and a leader of the opposition to the autocratic rule of Ferdinand Marcos. He was assassinated at Manila International Airport (now named Ninoy Aquino International Airport in his honor) upon returning home from exile in the United States. His death catapulted his widow, Corazon Aquino, to the limelight and the presidency, subsequently replacing the 20-year-old Marcos regime.
- Benigno Aquino Sr. (from Barangay San Agustin Murcia) – a Philippine senator and served as Speaker of the Second Philippine Republic National Assembly from 1943 to 1944. he is the father of Ninoy Aquino.
- Eva Estrada-Kalaw (from Barangay San Agustin Murcia) – a Philippine senator and served as a congresswoman in the Congress of the Philippines for 7 years. (1965–1972). Serving in Congress during the presidency of Ferdinand Marcos (Nationalist), she was part of a major transformation in Philippine domestic and foreign policies.
- Jesli Aquino Lapus (from Barangay San Nicolas Pob.) – a former Congressman of the 3rd District of Tarlac and former Secretary of Department of Trade and Industry as of 2010. He also served as Secretary of Education from 2006 to 2010.
- Lorna Tolentino (from Barangay Minane) – a multi-awarded actress and TV host.
- Tyron Perez (from Barangay Alfonso) – a model and actor on GMA Network's reality talent competition show, StarStruck.
- Majoy Baron – Alas Pilipinas Women mainstay, 1st Best Middle Blocker at 2019 ASEAN Grand Prix.
- Trisha Tubu – a volleyball player who is a two-time Best Opposite Hitter in the Premier Volleyball League.
- Will Gozum – a basketball player who won MVP in NCAA Season 98 men's basketball.
