= Aquino Center and Museum =

Museum in Tarlac City, Philippines

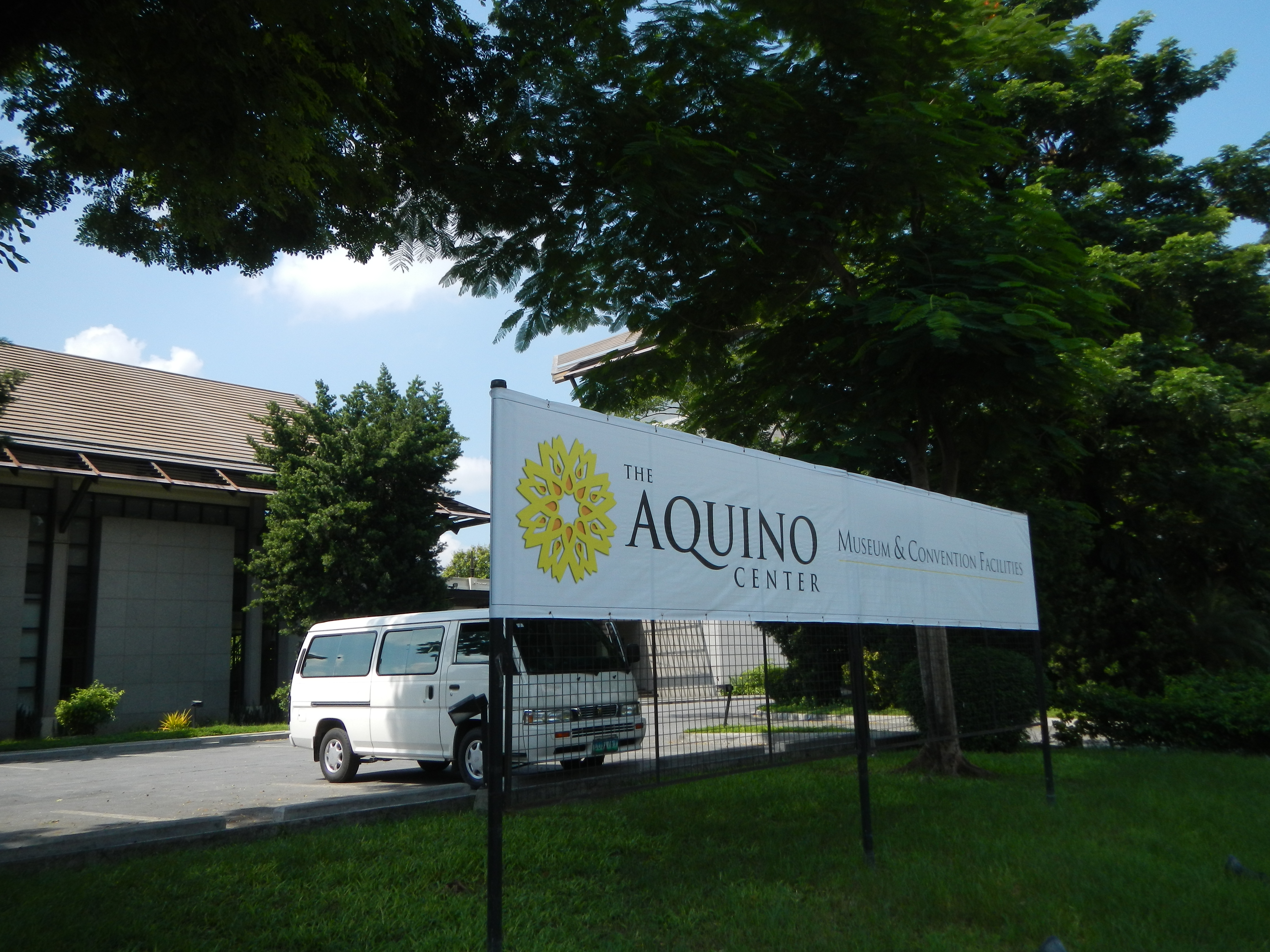
- Established: 2001; 25 years ago
- Location: Tarlac City, Philippines
- Coordinates: 15.4345°N 120.6019°E
- Building details

General information
- Inaugurated: August 21, 2001
- Renovated: 2023–2025
- Owner: Ninoy & Cory Aquino Foundation

Technical details
- Material: Concrete, steel, glass

Design and construction
- Architect: Dan Lichauco
- Architecture firm: Francisco Mañosa & Partners

Aquino Center and Museum is a museum in Tarlac City, Philippines dedicated to Senator Ninoy Aquino and presidents Corazon and Benigno Aquino III.

== History ==
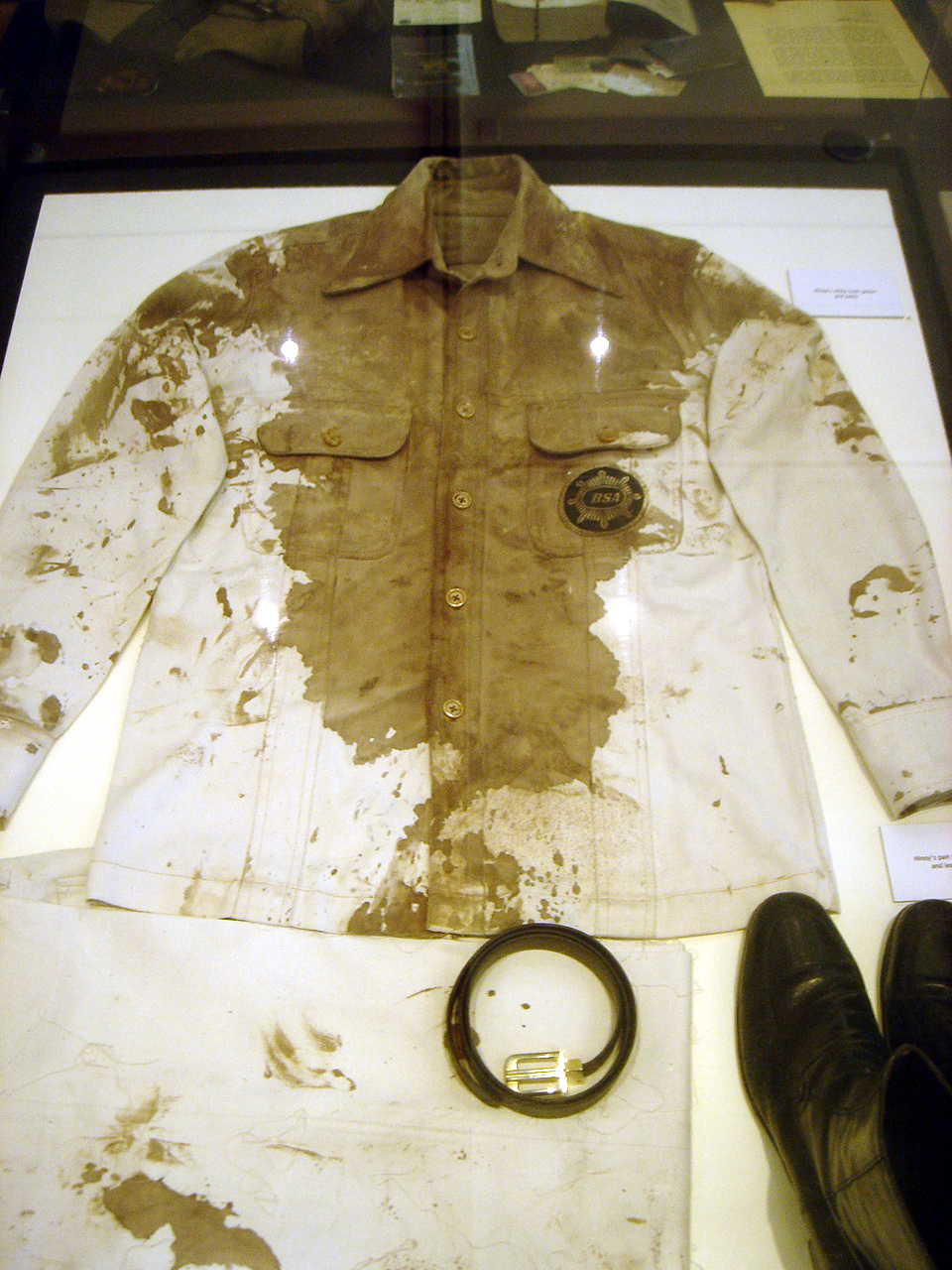
Ninoy Aquino's bloodied jacket on display at the museum (2008)

Work on establishing the Aquino Center began in 1993, a year after Corazon Aquino's presidency. The facility was inspired from the John F. Kennedy Presidential Library and Museum in Boston. The Benigno Aquino Foundation (later known as the Ninoy & Cory Aquino Foundation or NCAF) garnered ₱200 million from donors worldwide for the establishment of the museum while the Cojuangco family donated a 5 hectares (12 acres) lot within the Hacienda Luisita in Tarlac City.

Aquino Center and Museum opened on August 21, 2001, the 18th anniversary of Ninoy's assassination, in a ceremony attended by Corazon Aquino herself. The museum features the career of Senator Ninoy Aquino, including the assassination, the EDSA Revolution, and the subsequent presidency of Corazon Aquino.

Under NCAF executive director Kiko Aquino Dee, the museum closed after the 2022 presidential election which was won by Bongbong Marcos and underwent a two year renovation. The museum reopened on February 25, 2025. Additional memorabilia, including ones related to the presidency of Benigno Aquino III was included.

== Architecture and design ==
Dan Lichauco, an architect of the Francisco Mañosa firm and nephew of Ninoy Aquino, was designed the Aquino Center and Museum. The concrete, steel and glass building has a U-shaped structure with a lawn on its center. Lichauco also worked on the 2023–2025 renovation under Archion Architects.
