= Servillano Aquino =

Filipino revolutionary (1874–1959)

- General Servillano Aquino

Member of the Malolos Congress from Samar
- In office September 15, 1898 – November 13, 1899 Serving with Javier González Salvador and Juan Tongco

Personal details
- Born: Servillano Aquino y Aguilar; April 20, 1874 Angeles, Pampanga, Captaincy General of the Philippines, Spanish Empire
- Died: February 3, 1959 (aged 84) Tarlac, Philippines
- Spouses: Guadalupe Quiambao; Petronila Quiambao; Belen Sanchez
- Children: Gonzalo; Benigno; Amando; Fortunata; Herminio
- Relatives: Aquino family
- Education: Colegio de San Juan de Letran; University of Santo Tomas
- Profession: Revolutionary

Military service
- Branch/service: Philippine Revolutionary Army
- Years of service: 1896–1902
- Rank: General
- Battles/wars: Philippine Revolution; Philippine–American War

Servillano Aquino y Aguilar (April 20, 1874 – February 3, 1959), commonly nicknamed Mianong, was a Filipino general during the Philippine Revolution and the Philippine–American War. He served as a delegate to the Malolos Congress and was the grandfather of Benigno S. "Ninoy" Aquino Jr. and the great-grandfather of Benigno Aquino III, the 15th President of the Philippines.

== Early life and education ==
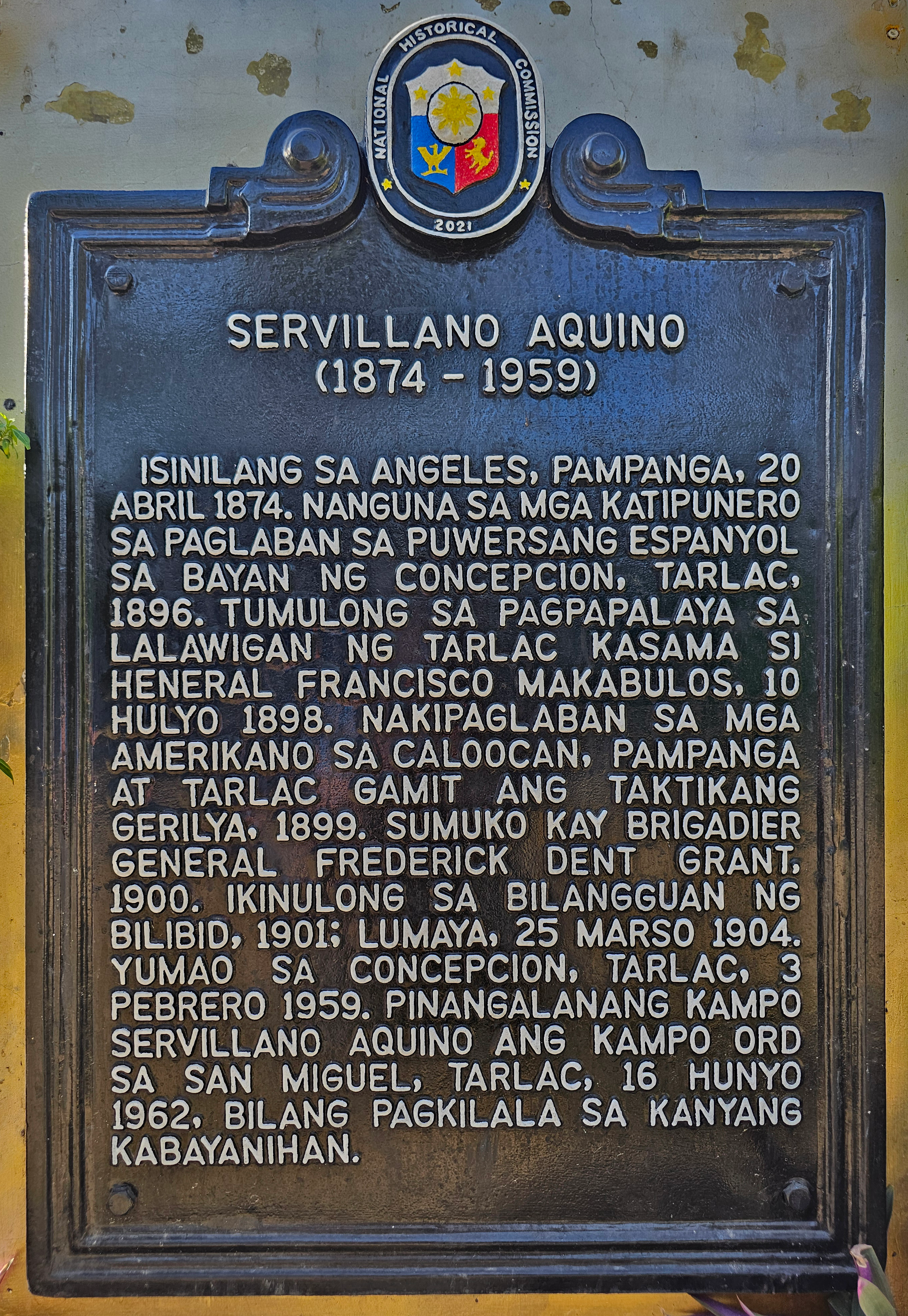
Historical marker installed in Concepcion, Tarlac in 2021

Servillano Aquino, known by his nickname "Mianong", was born on April 20, 1874, to Don Braulio Aquino y Lacsamana and Doña María Antonina Petrona Aguilar de Hipolito. He had his early education from a private tutor in Mexico, Pampanga. He moved to Manila and entered the Colegio de San Juan de Letran, and later, the University of Santo Tomas.

== Philippine–American War ==
In 1896, Aquino became a mason and joined the Katipunan. He was also elected mayor of Murcia, Tarlac and under General Francisco Macabulos, he organized the Filipino revolutionary forces against the Americans. He was promoted to major but was defeated in the battle at Mount Sinukuan or Mount Arayat in Arayat, Pampanga. After the Pact of Biak-na-Bato was signed, Aquino was self-exiled to Hong Kong together with President Emilio Aguinaldo and the revolutionary government after receiving 100,000 pesos from the Spanish government in exchange of their exile. He returned to the Philippines with Emilio Aguinaldo and other exiles in 1898 and was assigned under General Antonio Luna to fight against the American forces. Together they attacked Manila but retreated to Mount Arayat. In September 1902, he surrendered and was jailed in Bilibid Prison and sentenced to hang. However, United States President Theodore Roosevelt pardoned Aquino after two years.

== Personal life ==
He married Guadalupe Quiambao, with whom he had three sons, namely Gonzalo (born 1893), Benigno Simeon (1894–1947) and Amando (born 1896). After Gudalupe's death, he later married his widowed sister-in-law, Petronila Quiambao Estrada and became stepfather to Saturnina Estrada and Salvador Estrada (1892-1940, father of Eva Estrada Kalaw). They had a daughter, Fortunata (born 1905). He also married Belen Sanchez, and had a son with her, Herminio (1949-2021).

== Death ==
He died on February 3, 1959.

== See also ==
- List of people pardoned or granted clemency by the president of the United States
