= Kiko Aquino Dee =

Filipino political analyst (born 1991)

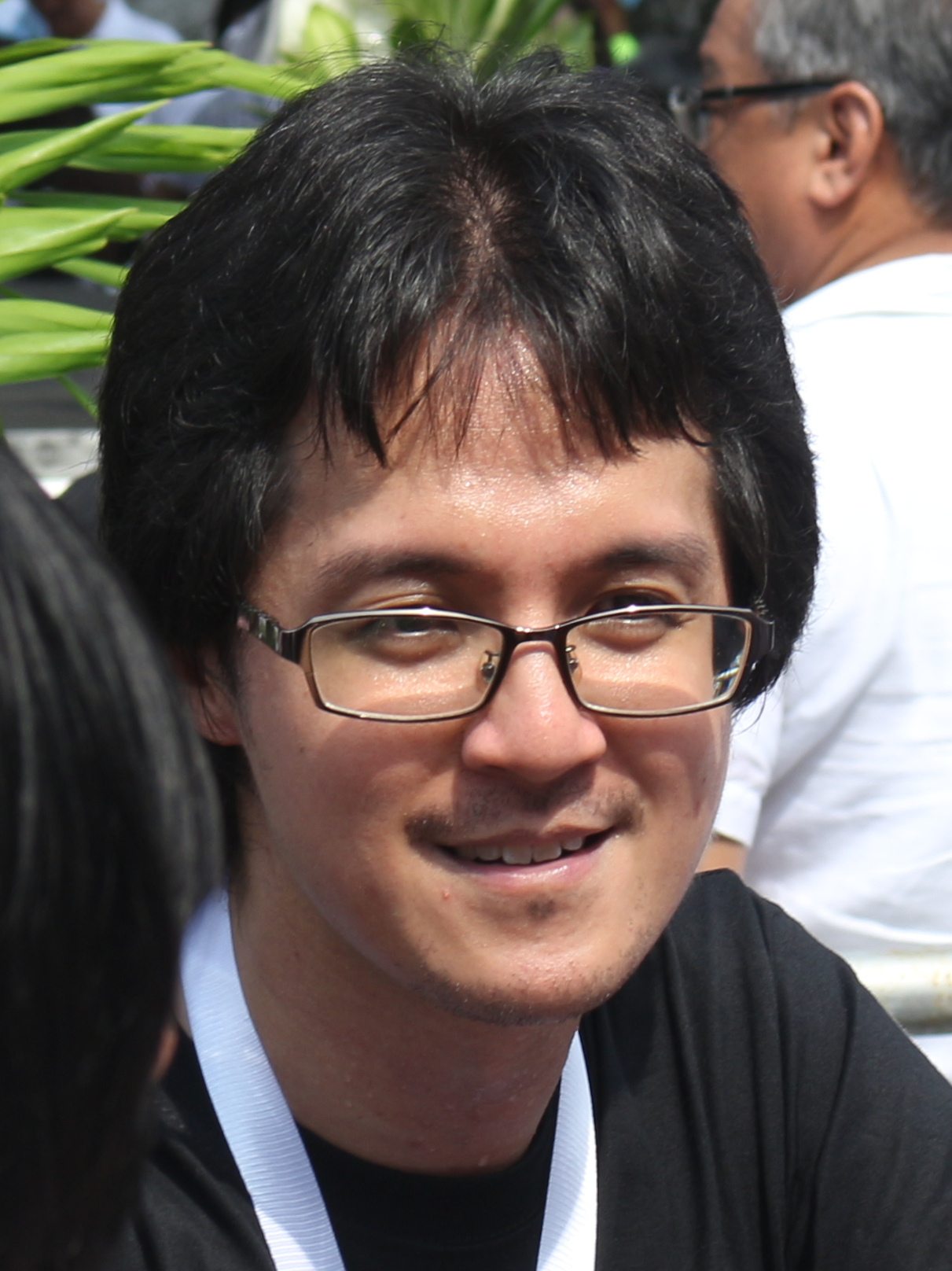
- Aquino Dee in 2025
- Born: Francis Joseph Aquino Dee; November 11, 1991 (age 34); Quezon City, Philippines
- Education: University of the Philippines Diliman (BA); London School of Economics (MSc)
- Occupation: Political analyst
- Known for: Political commentary, academic work
- Relatives: Aquino family Cojuangco family

Francis Joseph "Kiko" Aquino Dee (born November 11, 1991) is a Filipino political analyst and a member of the prominent Aquino political family. As the grandson of former senator Benigno Aquino Jr. and former president Corazon Aquino, he has been active in political commentary and historical preservation efforts in the Philippines.

== Early life and education ==
Aquino Dee was born on November 11, 1991. He is the son of Victoria Elisa "Viel" Aquino, one of the five children of the late politicians Benigno Jr. and Corazon Aquino, and Richard Joseph Dee.

He graduated magna cum laude from the University of the Philippines Diliman in 2012 with a Bachelor of Arts degree in political science, followed by a Master of Science in political science and political economy from the London School of Economics in 2014.

== Public commentary and political views ==
=== On historical memory and democracy ===
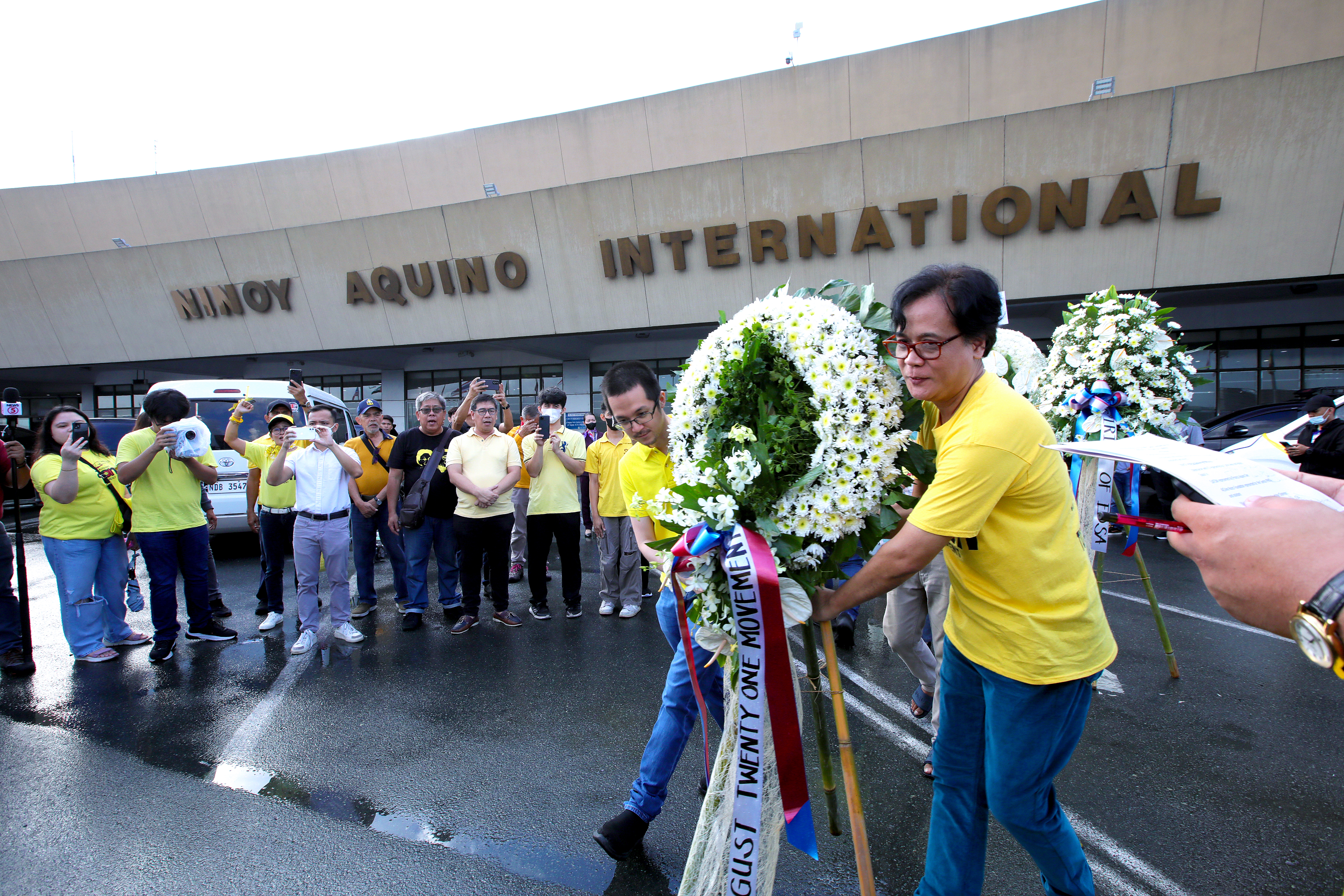
Aquino Dee (left) offers a wreath of flowers in 2023 to commemorate his grandfather Ninoy Aquino's assassination at the Manila airport's tarmac.

Aquino Dee has been vocal about preserving accurate historical narratives of the Philippines' democratic struggle. He has emphasized remembering the EDSA Revolution while cautioning against its politicization in contemporary conflicts.

=== Opposition to historical distortion ===
Aquino Dee has spoken against attempts to distorting Philippine history, particularly regarding the Marcos dictatorship. He has encouraged younger Filipinos to combat disinformation by verifying facts and upholding democratic values.

=== Views on contemporary politics ===
Aquino Dee has maintained that the Aquino family, a prominent political family, should remain neutral in political conflicts. In 2024, he stated that the family legacy should not be involved in the Duterte-Marcos political rivalry.

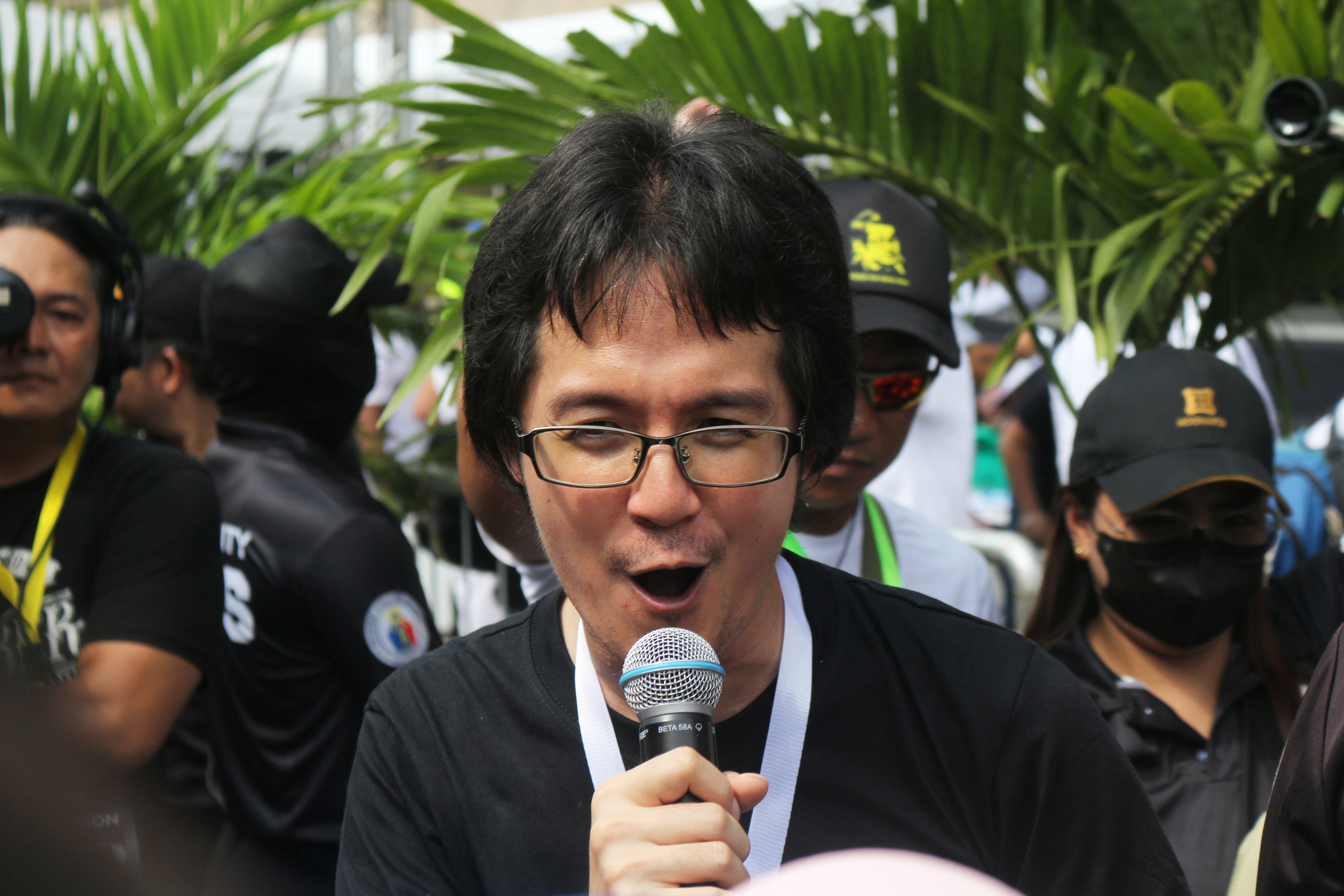
Aquino Dee hosting a program segment during the 2nd Trillion Peso March at the People Power Monument

=== Criticism of national symbols redesign ===
In December 2024, Aquino Dee criticized the Bangko Sentral ng Pilipinas' redesign of Philippine peso bills, arguing that removing historical figures diminished recognition of national heroes' contributions.
