= Ninoy Aquino =

Filipino politician (1932–1983)

Ninoy Aquino QSC CLH KGCR
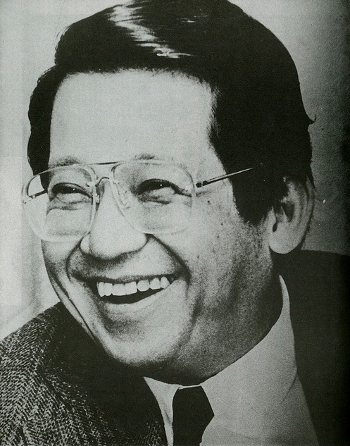
- Aquino, c. 1980s

Senator of the Philippines
- In office December 30, 1967 – September 23, 1972 (Note: Original term until December 30, 1973; cut short pursuant to the Declaration of Martial Law on September 23, 1972.)

18th Governor of Tarlac
- In office February 16, 1961 – December 30, 1967
- Vice Governor: Lazaro Domingo
- Preceded by: Arsenio Lugay
- Succeeded by: Danding Cojuangco

Vice Governor of Tarlac
- In office December 30, 1959 – February 15, 1961
- Governor: Arsenio Lugay
- Preceded by: Position established
- Succeeded by: Lazaro Domingo

Mayor of Concepcion, Tarlac
- In office December 30, 1955 – December 30, 1959
- Preceded by: Nicolas Feliciano
- Succeeded by: Romeo Yumul

Presidential Adviser on Defense Affairs
- In office 1949–1954
- President: Elpidio Quirino; Ramon Magsaysay

Personal details
- Born: Benigno Simeón Aquino Jr. November 27, 1932 Concepcion, Tarlac, Philippine Islands
- Died: August 21, 1983 (aged 50) Manila International Airport, Parañaque, Philippines
- Cause of death: Assassination
- Resting place: Manila Memorial Park – Sucat, Parañaque, Philippines
- Party: Laban (1978–1983); Liberal (1959–1983)
- Other political affiliations: Nacionalista (1955–1959)
- Spouse: Corazon Cojuangco (m. 1954)
- Children: 5, including Benigno III / "Noynoy" and Kris
- Parents: Benigno Aquino Sr.; Aurora Aquino
- Relatives: Aquino family; Cojuangco family (by marriage)
- Education: Ateneo de Manila University; University of the Philippines Diliman
- Occupation: Journalist; politician
- Nickname: Ninoy

Benigno Simeón "Ninoy" Aquino Jr. (/əˈkiːnoʊ/ ə-KEE-noh, Tagalog: [bɛˈniːɡno ʔɐˈxiːno]; November 27, 1932 – August 21, 1983), was a Filipino politician and journalist who served as a senator of the Philippines (1967–1972) and governor of the province of Tarlac (1963–1967). Aquino was the husband of Corazon Aquino, who became the 11th president of the Philippines after his assassination, and father of Benigno Aquino III, who became the 15th president of the Philippines. Aquino, together with Gerry Roxas and Jovito R. Salonga, helped form the leadership of the Liberal Party-based coalition against ex-President Ferdinand Marcos. Aquino was a significant emotional leader, who, together with the intellectual leader Sen. Jose W. Diokno, led the overall opposition.

Early in his Senate career, Aquino vigorously attempted to investigate the Jabidah massacre in March 1968. Shortly after the imposition of martial law in 1972, Aquino was arrested along with other members of the opposition. He was incarcerated for seven years. He has been described as Marcos' "most famous political prisoner". He founded his own party, Lakas ng Bayan, and ran in the 1978 Philippine parliamentary election, but all the party's candidates lost in the election. In 1980, he was permitted by Marcos and his wife Imelda to travel to the United States for medical treatment following a heart attack. During the early 1980s, he became one of the most notable critics of the Marcos regime, and enjoyed popularity across the US due to the numerous rallies he attended at the time.

As the situation in the Philippines worsened, Aquino decided to return to face Marcos and restore democracy in the country, despite numerous threats against him. He was assassinated at the Manila International Airport on August 21, 1983, upon returning from his self-imposed exile. His death revitalized opposition to Marcos; it also catapulted his widow, Corazon, into the political limelight and prompted her to successfully run for a six-year term as president as a member of the United Nationalist Democratic Organization (UNIDO) party in the 1986 snap election.

Among other public structures, Manila International Airport has since been renamed Ninoy Aquino International Airport in his honor, and the anniversary of his death is a national holiday. Aquino has also been listed as a Motu Proprio human rights violations victim of the Martial Law era.

== Early life and career ==
Benigno Simeón Aquino Jr. was born in Concepcion, Tarlac on November 27, 1932, to Benigno Aquino Sr., who was then a senator from the 3rd district and Senate majority leader, and Aurora (née Aquino) Aquino from a prosperous family of hacienderos, the original owners of Hacienda Tinang.

His grandfather, Servillano Aquino, was a general in the revolutionary army of Emilio Aguinaldo, the officially recognized first President of the Philippines.

He received his elementary education at the basic education department of De La Salle College and finished at the basic education department of Saint Joseph's College of Quezon City. He then graduated at the high school department of San Beda College. Aquino took his tertiary education at Ateneo de Manila University to obtain a Bachelor of Arts degree, but he interrupted his studies. According to one of his biographies, he considered himself to be an average student; his grade was not in the line of 90s nor did it fall into the 70s. At the age of 17, he was the youngest war correspondent to cover the Korean War for The Manila Times of Don Joaquín "Chino" Roces. Because of his journalistic feats, he received the Philippine Legion of Honor award from President Elpidio Quirino when aged 18. At 21, he became a close adviser to then Defense Secretary Ramon Magsaysay. Aquino took up law at the University of the Philippines Diliman, where he became a member of Upsilon Sigma Phi, the same fraternity as Ferdinand Marcos. He interrupted his studies again however to pursue a career in journalism. According to Máximo Soliven, Aquino "later 'explained' that he had decided to go to as many schools as possible, so that he could make as many new friends as possible." In early 1954, he was appointed by President Ramon Magsaysay, his wedding sponsor to his 1953 wedding at the Our Lady of Sorrows Church in Pasay with Corazon Cojuangco, to act as personal emissary to Luis Taruc, leader of the Hukbalahap rebel group. After four months of negotiations, he was credited for Taruc's unconditional surrender and was given a second Philippine Legion of Honor award with the degree of Commander on October 14, 1954.

== Political career ==
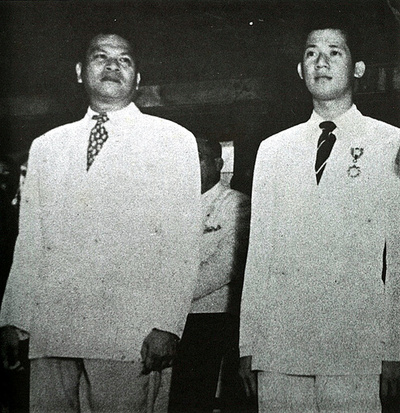
Confernment of the Philippine Legion of Honor (rank of Pinuno) to Benigno Aquino Jr. (right) by then-Defense Secretary Ramon Magsaysay in August 1951

Aquino gained an early familiarity with Philippine politics, as he was born into one of the Philippines' political and landholding clans. His grandfather served under President Aguinaldo, and his father held office under Presidents Quezon and Jose P. Laurel. As a consequence, he became mayor of Concepcion in 1955 at the age of 23. However, defeated candidate Nicolas Y. Feliciano instituted quo warranto proceedings against Aquino for being underaged at the time of his election. The Supreme Court would affirm the lower court's ruling unseating Aquino from his position.

He would later return to the political scene, being elected the nation's youngest vice governor at 27 (the record was later surpassed by Bongbong Marcos at 22 in 1980). Two years later, when his predecessor resigned, he became governor of Tarlac province in February 1961, being elected to the position in his own right in 1963. After the 1961 presidential election, Aquino was appointed in December 1961 by outgoing president Carlos P. Garcia to a committee overseeing the inauguration of Diosdado Macapagal as chaired by Finance Secretary Dominador Aytona and Senator Ferdinand Marcos. While initially a Nacionalista, same as his father, he would jump to the Liberal Party following Macapagal's election. He would later become the party's secretary-general in 1966.

In 1968, during his first year as senator, Aquino alleged that Marcos was on the road to establishing "a garrison state" by "ballooning the armed forces budget," saddling the defense establishment with "overstaying generals" and "militarizing our civilian government offices."

Aquino became known as a constant critic of the Marcos regime, as his flamboyant rhetoric had made him a darling of the media. His most polemical speech, "A Pantheon for Imelda", was delivered on February 10, 1969. He assailed the Cultural Center, the first project of First Lady Imelda Marcos as extravagant, and dubbed it "a monument to shame" and labelled its designer "a megalomaniac, with a penchant to captivate". By the end of the day, the country's broadsheets had blared that he labelled the President's wife, his cousin Paz's former ward, and a woman he had once courted, "the Philippines' Eva Peron". President Marcos is said to have been outraged and labelled Aquino "a congenital liar". The First Lady's friends angrily accused Aquino of being "ungallant". These so-called "fiscalization" tactics of Aquino quickly became his trademark in the Senate.

Aquino would also uncover details regarding the Jabidah Massacre and would link it as a plan by Marcos to ensure his grip on power, delivering a scathing privilege speech on the Senate floor on March 28, 1968.

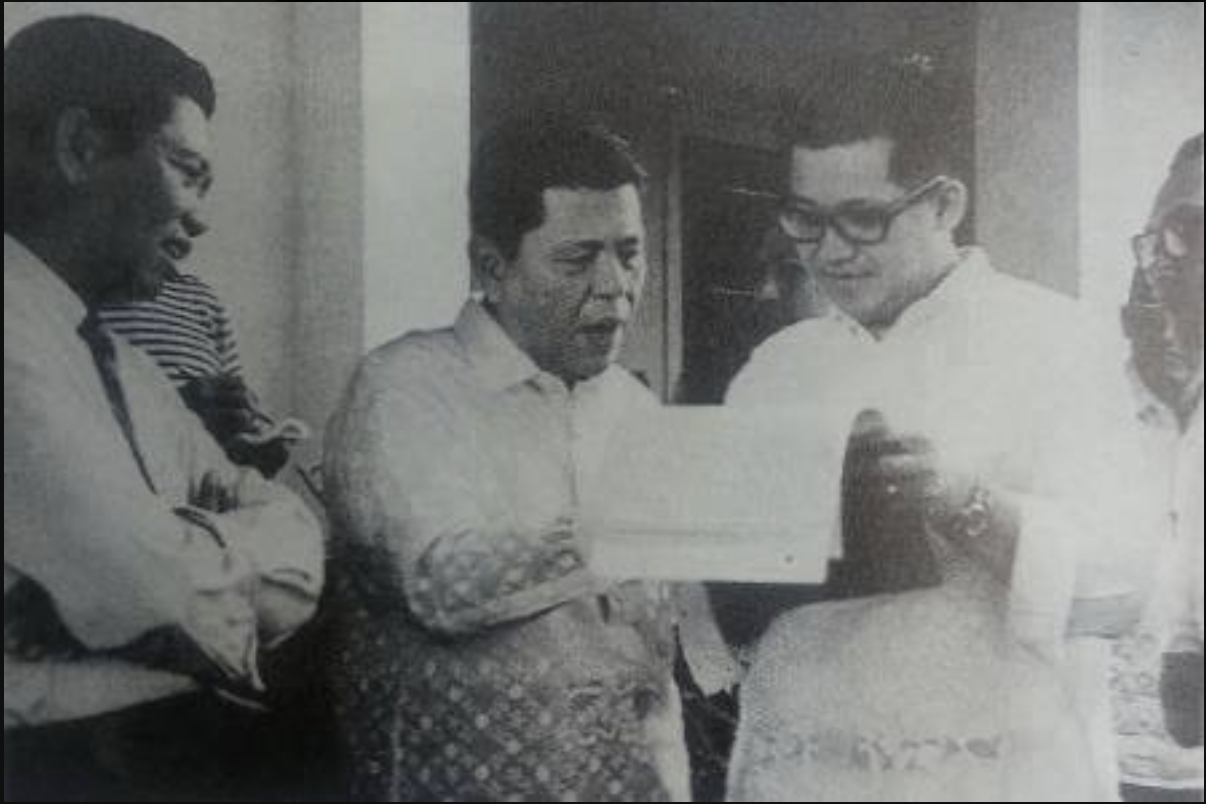
Aquino with Jose W. Diokno; the two main opposition leaders arrested by Marcos in Laur, Nueva Ecija after Proclamation No. 1081

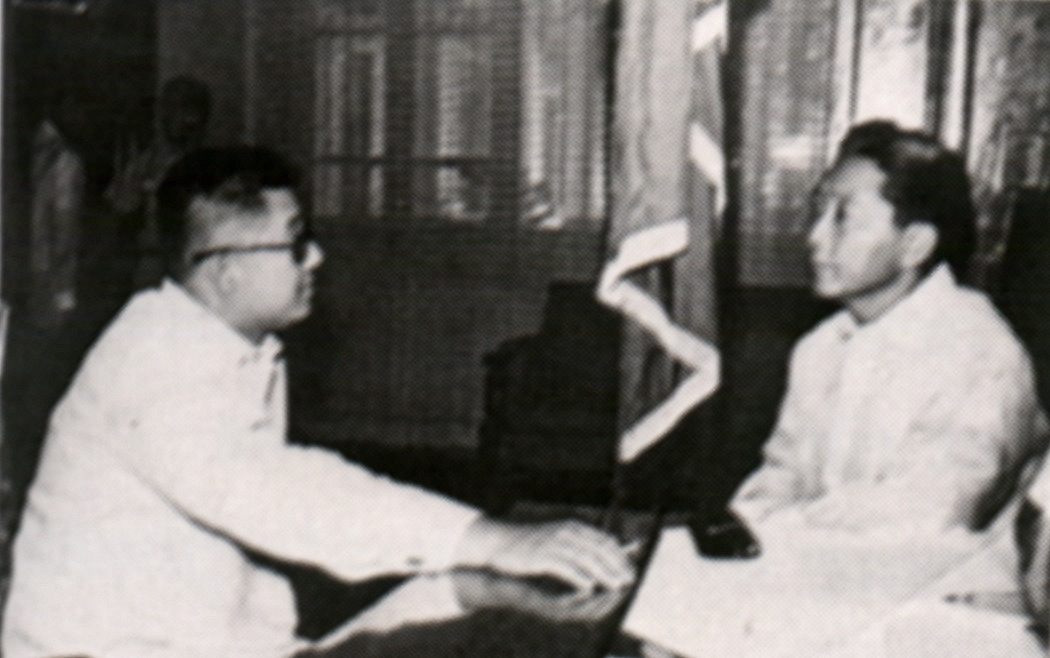
Undated photo of President Ferdinand Marcos meeting Aquino

It was not until the Plaza Miranda bombing on August 21, 1971, that the pattern of direct confrontation between Marcos and Aquino emerged. At 9:15 pm, at the kick-off rally of the Liberal Party, the candidates formed a line on a makeshift platform and were raising their hands as the crowd applauded. The band played, a fireworks display drew all eyes, when suddenly two loud explosions obviously were not part of the show. In an instant, the stage became a scene of wild carnage. The police later discovered two fragmentation grenades that had been thrown at the stage by "unknown persons". Eight people died, and 120 others were wounded, many critically.

Aquino, elected senator in 1967, was not a candidate in the 1971 midterm election hence was not in Plaza Miranda, but his absence caused some to assume that Aquino's friends in the New People's Army (NPA) tipped him off in advance. Unnamed sources accused Aquino of being involved. No one has ever been prosecuted for the attack. Many historians continue to suspect Marcos as the culprit behind the incident, as he is known to have used false flag attacks as a pretext for his declaration of martial law at that time. Historian Joseph Scalice, however, has argued that while the Marcos government was allied with the Partido Komunista ng Pilipinas (PKP) in carrying out bombings in the early 1970s, "the evidence of history now overwhelmingly suggests that the Communist Party of the Philippines, despite being allied with the Liberal Party, was responsible for this bombing, seeing it as a means of facilitating repression which they argued would hasten revolution."

== Early martial law years ==
Marcos declared martial law on September 21, 1972, through Proclamation No. 1081 and went on air to broadcast his declaration on the midnight of September 23. Aquino and Sen. Diokno were two of the first to be arrested, and were imprisoned in Fort Bonifacio on trumped-up charges of murder, illegal possession of firearms and subversion. Aquino was tried before Military Commission No. 2, headed by Major-General Jose Syjuco and moved to the Codenamed "Alpha" Room at Fort Magsaysay in Laur, Nueva Ecija.

On April 4, 1975, Aquino announced that he was going on a hunger strike, a fast to the death to protest the injustices of his military trial. Ten days through his hunger strike, he instructed his lawyers to withdraw all the motions he had submitted to the Supreme Court. As weeks went by, he subsisted solely on salt tablets, sodium bicarbonate, amino acids and two glasses of water a day. Even as he grew weaker, suffering from chills and cramps, soldiers forcibly dragged him to the military tribunal's session. His family and hundreds of friends and supporters heard Mass nightly at the Santuario de San Jose in Greenhills, San Juan, praying for his survival. Near the end, Aquino's weight dropped from 54 to 36 kilograms. Aquino nonetheless was able to walk throughout his ordeal. On May 13, 1975, on the 40th day, his family and several priests and friends, begged him to end his fast, pointing out that even Christ fasted only for 40 days. He acquiesced, confident that he had made a symbolic gesture.

He, however, remained in prison, and the trial continued, drawn out for several years. Throughout the trial, Aquino said that the military tribunal had no authority over his and his co-accused cases. On November 25, 1977, the Military Commission found Aquino, along with NPA leaders Bernabe Buscayno (Kumander Dante) and Lt. Victor Corpus, guilty of all charges and sentenced them to death by firing squad. Marcos commuted their death sentence due to international pressure over his government's human rights record.

== 1978 election, bypass surgery ==
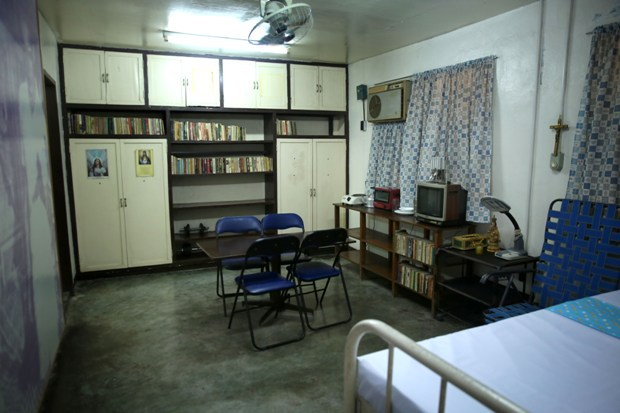
The room where Aquino was detained from August 1973 to 1980

In 1978, from his prison cell, Aquino was allowed to run in the 1978 Philippine parliamentary election. As Ninoy's Liberal Party colleagues were boycotting the election, he formed the Lakas ng Bayan, an umbrella coalition of opposition parties and individuals. The party had 21 candidates for the Region IV-A (Metro Manila) area, including Ninoy himself. While initially agreeing to the boycott due to "the government already [having] the forces in its command and the entire machinery of politics which [they] do not have," Aquino later changed his mind and opted to take part in the elections to have the chance to "talk to the people," having been imprisoned for almost six years at that point.

On March 10, 1978, he was entitled to one television interview on GTV's Face the Nation, hosted by Ronnie Nathanielsz with panelists Enrique Romualdez of the Daily Express, Reynaldo Naval of the Times Journal and Teddy Owen of Bulletin Today. The interview proved to a startled and impressed populace that imprisonment had neither dulled his "rapier-like tongue" nor dampened his fighting spirit. According to Aquino, he wanted to give the people a vehicle to express their frustration or their anger and to serve as a fiscalizer in the Interim Batasang Pambansa. He further justified his candidacy in Metro Manila instead of his home province of Tarlac as to submerge his popularity, with a victory meaning that the opposition of win, instead of himself just winning. However, all of the party's candidates lost the election, with Aquino being the best-performing opposition candidate, ranking 22nd in the 21-seat at-large contest.

In mid-March 1980, Aquino suffered a heart attack, mostly in a solitary cell. He was transported to the Philippine Heart Center, where he suffered a second heart attack. ECG and other tests showed that he had a blocked artery. Philippine surgeons were reluctant to do a coronary bypass, because it could involve them in a controversy. In addition, Aquino refused to submit himself to Philippine doctors, fearing possible Marcos "duplicity"; he preferred to go to the United States for the procedure or return to his cell at Fort Bonifacio and die.

His request was granted and Ninoy was allowed to go to the United States for surgery, together with his entire family. This was arranged after a secret hospital visit by Imelda Marcos. This "emergency leave" was set up when Ninoy supposedly agreed to the conditions that, first, he will return, and second, he will not speak out against Marcos in the US. Ninoy was operated on by Rolando M. Solis, a Filipino American and the longest-practicing cardiologist in Dallas, Texas, where the operation took place. After the surgery, Ninoy made a quick recovery, after which he decided to renounce the agreement, saying, "a pact with the devil is no pact at all".

He, Cory and their children started a new life in Massachusetts. He continued to work on two books and gave a series of lectures while on fellowship grants from Harvard University and Massachusetts Institute of Technology. His travels across the US had become opportunities for him to deliver speeches critical of the Marcos government, going as far as Damascus in order to meet with Muslims and the MNLF in order to mediate in the Moro conflict. Throughout his years of expatriation, Aquino was always aware that his life in the U.S. was temporary. He never stopped affirming his eventual return even as he enjoyed American hospitality and a peaceful life with his family on American soil. After spending seven years and seven months in prison, Aquino's finances were in ruins. Making up for the lost time as the family's breadwinner, he toured America; attending symposiums, lectures, and giving speeches in freedom rallies opposing the Marcos government. The most memorable was held at the Wilshire Ebell Theater in Los Angeles, California on February 15, 1981.

== Planned return to the Philippines ==
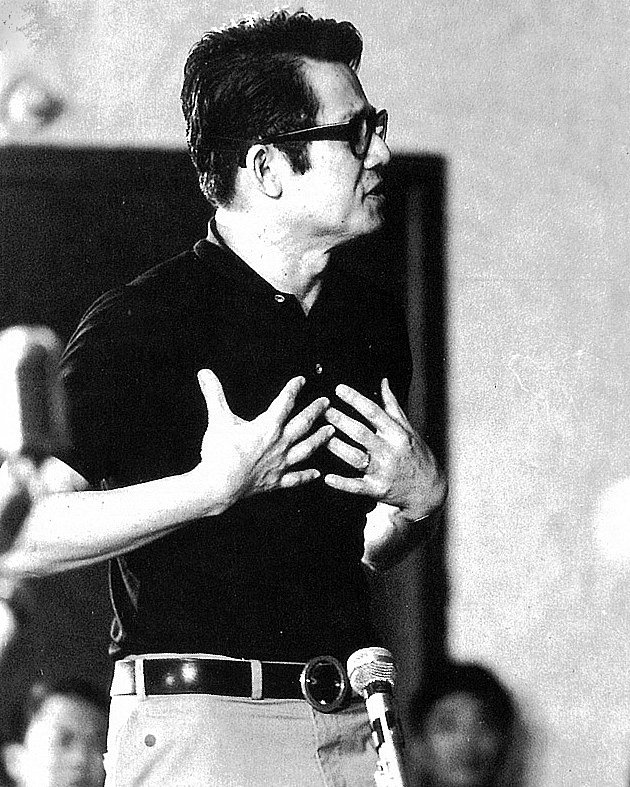
Benigno Aquino Jr. delivering a speech during his trial to the Military Commission No. 2 in 1973.

In the first quarter of 1983, Aquino received news about the deteriorating political situation in his country and the rumored declining health of President Marcos (due to lupus). He believed that it was expedient for him to speak to Marcos and present to him his rationale for the country's return to democracy, before extremists took over and made such a change impossible. Moreover, his years of absence made his allies worry that the Filipinos might have resigned themselves to Marcos' strongman rule and that without his leadership the centrist opposition would die a natural death.

Aquino decided to go back to the Philippines, fully aware of the dangers that awaited him. Warned that he would either be imprisoned or killed, Aquino answered, "if it's my fate to die by an assassin's bullet, so be it. But I cannot be petrified by inaction, or fear of assassination, and therefore stay in the side..." His family, however, learned from a Philippine Consular official that there were orders from Ministry of Foreign Affairs not to issue any passports for them. At that time, their passports had expired and their renewal had been denied. They therefore formulated a plan for Aquino to fly alone (to attract less attention), with the rest of the family to follow him after two weeks. Despite the government's ban on issuing him a passport, Aquino acquired one with the help of Rashid Lucman, a former Mindanao legislator and founder of the Bangsamoro Liberation Front, a Moro separatist group against Marcos. It carried the alias Marcial Bonifacio (Marcial for martial law and Bonifacio for Fort Bonifacio, his erstwhile prison). He eventually obtained a legitimate passport from a sympathizer working in a Philippine consulate through the help of Roque Ablan Jr., who was then a congressman for Ilocos Norte. The Marcos government warned all international airlines that they would be denied landing rights and forced to return if they tried to fly Aquino back to the Philippines. Aquino insisted that it was his natural right as a citizen to come back to his homeland, and that no government could prevent him from doing so. He left Logan International Airport on August 13, 1983, took a circuitous route home from Boston, via Los Angeles, to Singapore. In Singapore, then-Tunku Ibrahim Ismail of Johor met Aquino upon his arrival and later brought him to Johor, Malaysia to meet with other Malaysian leaders. Once in Johor, Aquino met up with Tunku Ibrahim's father, Sultan Iskandar, who was a close friend to Aquino.

He then left for Hong Kong and on to Taipei. He had chosen Taipei as the final stopover when he learned the Philippines had severed diplomatic ties with the Republic of China (Taiwan). This made him feel more secure; the Taiwan government could pretend they were not aware of his presence. There would also be a couple of Taiwanese friends accompanying him. From Taipei, he flew to Manila on then Taiwan's flag carrier China Airlines Flight 811.

Marcos wanted Aquino to stay out of politics. However, Aquino asserted his willingness to suffer the consequences declaring, "the Filipino is worth dying for." He wished to express an earnest plea for Marcos to step down, for a peaceful regime change and a return to democratic institutions. Anticipating the worst, at an interview in his suite at the Taipei Grand Hotel, he revealed that he would be wearing a bullet-proof vest, but he also said that "it's only good for the body, but in the head there's nothing else we can do." Sensing his own doom, he told the journalists accompanying him on the flight, "You have to be very ready with your hand camera because this action can become very fast. In a matter of a three or four minutes it could be all over, you know, and [laughing] I may not be able to talk to you again after this." His last televised interview, with journalist Jim Laurie, took place on the flight just prior to his assassination.

In his last formal statement that he was not able to deliver, he said, "I have returned on my free will to join the ranks of those struggling to restore our rights and freedoms through non-violence. I seek no confrontation."

== Assassination and aftermath ==
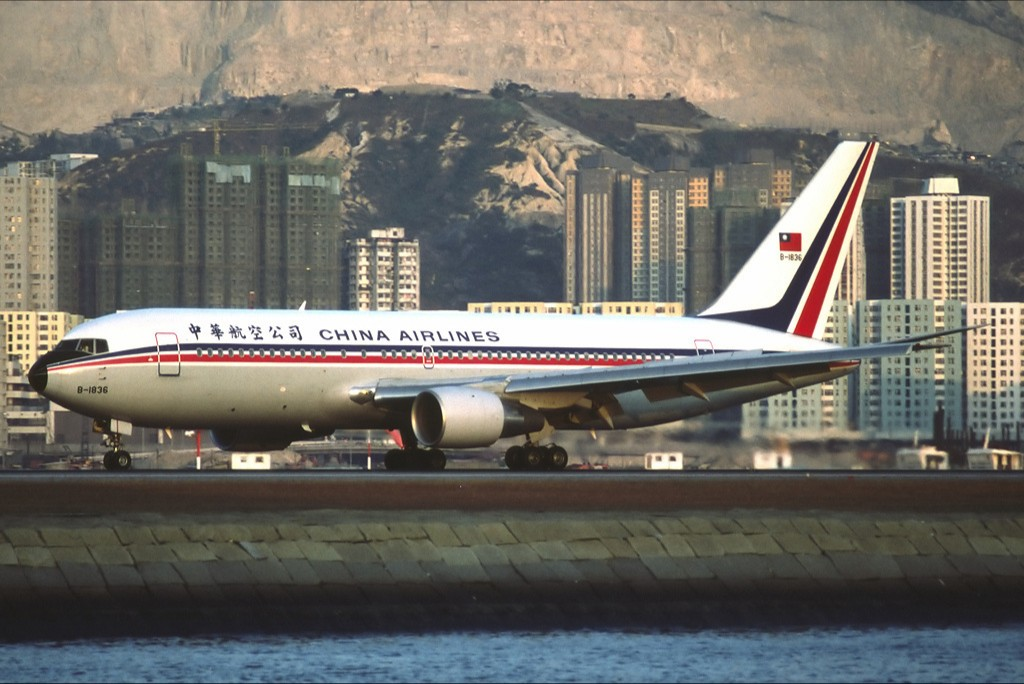
B-1836, the aircraft involved in the assassination, taxiing at Kai Tak Airport

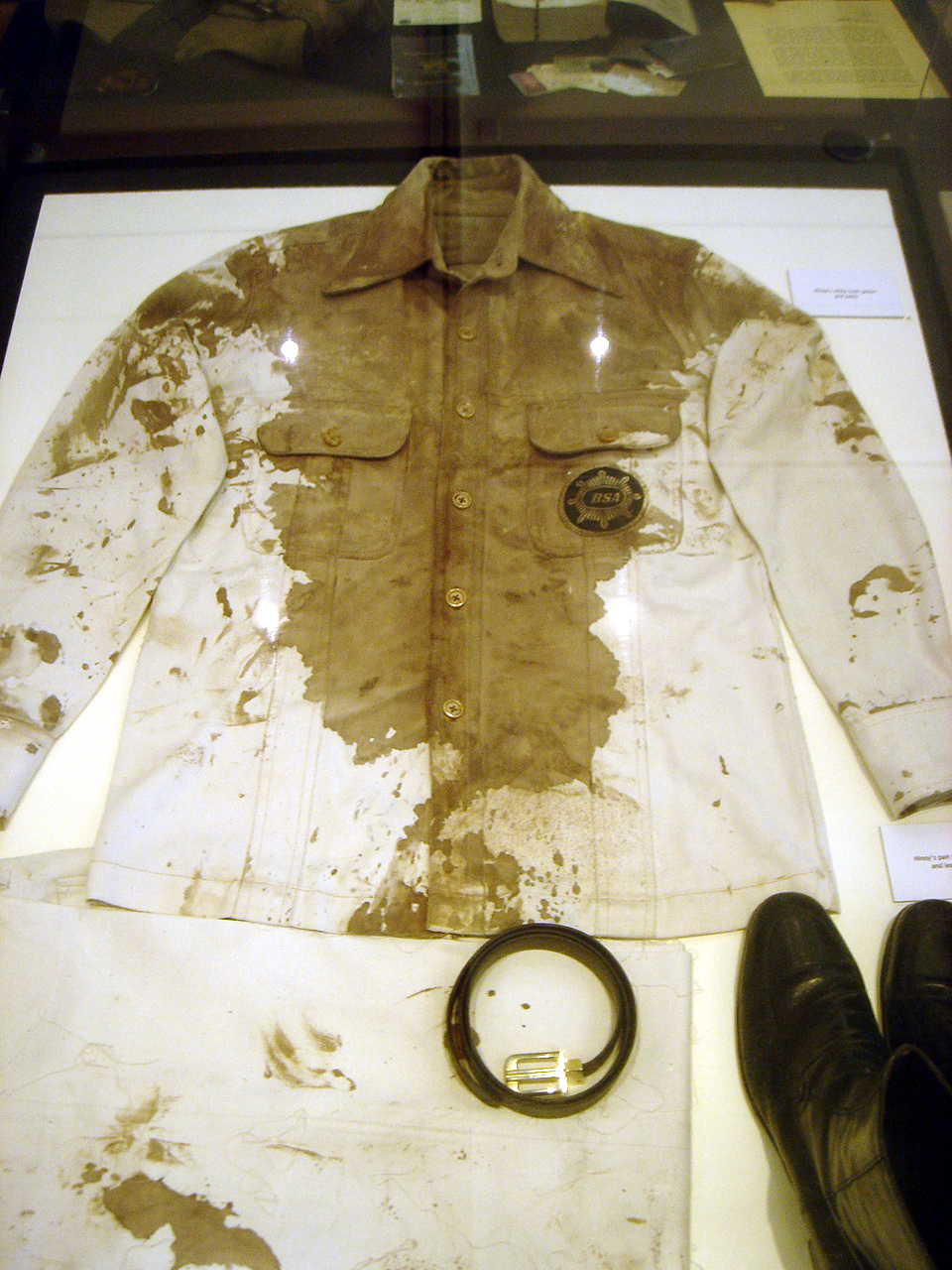
Bloodied shirt and clothes worn by Aquino during his assassination on display at the Aquino Center and Museum in Tarlac in July 2008

Aquino was shot in the head after returning to the Philippines in the early afternoon on August 21, 1983. About 1,000 security personnel had been assigned by the Marcos government to ensure Aquino's safe return to his detention cell in Fort Bonifacio, but this did not prevent the assassination. Another man present at the airport tarmac, Rolando Galman, was shot dead shortly after Aquino was killed. The Marcos government falsely claimed that Galman was the trigger man in Aquino's assassination.

An investigation headed by Justice Corazon Agrava led to murder charges being filed against twenty-five military men and one civilian. They were acquitted by the Sandiganbayan on December 2, 1985, in what the Supreme Court would later describe as a "mock trial" ordered by "the authoritarian president" himself. The reaction was swift, a major coalition called JAJA or "Justice for Aquino, Justice for All" was formed in 1983.

After Marcos' government was overthrown, another investigation found sixteen soldiers guilty. They were sentenced in 1990 by the Sandiganbayan to life in prison, a decision affirmed by the Supreme Court. Some were released over the years, the last ones in March 2009.

After the assassination, the opposition ran for the Regular Batasang Pambansa under the United Nationalist Democratic Organization (UNIDO) and the Partido Demokratiko Pilipino–Lakas ng Bayan (PDP–Laban) against the ruling Kilusang Bagong Lipunan of Ferdinand Marcos. In the wake of the massive outpouring of protest and discontent following the assassination of Aquino, the opposition performed better during the 1984 Philippine parliamentary election compared to the 1978 Philippine parliamentary election, winning 61 seats out of 183 seats, or 33% of the total number of seats.

== Funeral ==
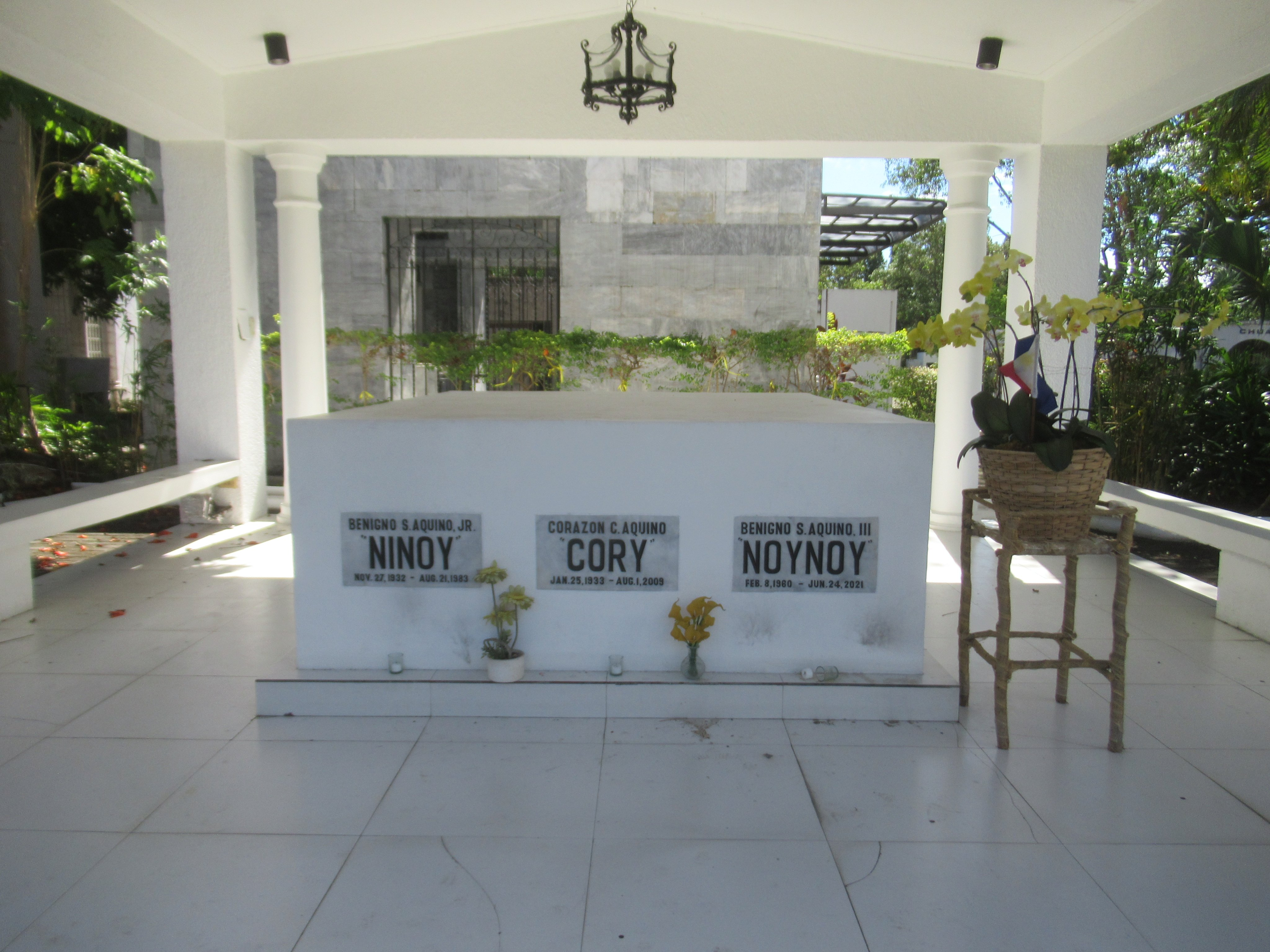
The shared tomb of Ninoy, Cory, and Noynoy Aquino at the Manila Memorial Park – Sucat in Parañaque, Philippines, photographed in 2025.

Hours after the assassination, Aquino's remains were autopsied at Loyola Memorial Chapels in Makati. Aquino's wife, Cory, was still in Boston when she was informed of the assassination through telephone by Japanese congressman and family friend Shintaro Ishihara. On the following day, his remains lay in state at the Aquino household in Times Street, Quezon City for several days, with his clothes unchanged, and no effort was made to disguise a bullet wound that had disfigured his face. His remains were also transferred to the Santo Domingo Church during that period. In an interview with Aquino's mother, Aurora, she told the funeral parlor not to apply makeup nor embalm her son, to show "what they did to my son". Aquino's wife, Cory, and children Ballsy, Pinky, Viel, Noynoy, and Kris arrived in the Philippines on August 23. His remains were later brought to Tarlac on August 29 for a funeral in Concepcion and at the Hacienda Luisita Chapel. Thousands of supporters flocked to see the bloodied body of Aquino.

Aquino's remains were returned to Metro Manila for a final funeral procession on August 31. It lasted from 9 a.m., when his funeral mass was held at Santo Domingo Church, with the Cardinal Archbishop of Manila, Jaime Sin officiating, to 9 p.m., when his body was interred at the Manila Memorial Park in Parañaque. More than two million people lined the streets for the procession. Some stations like the church-sponsored Radio Veritas and DZRH were the only stations to cover the entire ceremony.

Jovito Salonga, then head of the Liberal Party, referred to Aquino as "the greatest president we never had", adding:

Ninoy was getting impatient in Boston, he felt isolated by the flow of events in the Philippines. In early 1983, Marcos was seriously ailing, the Philippine economy was just as rapidly declining, and insurgency was becoming a serious problem. Ninoy thought that by coming home he might be able to persuade Marcos to restore democracy and somehow revitalize the Liberal Party.

== Historical reputation and legacy ==
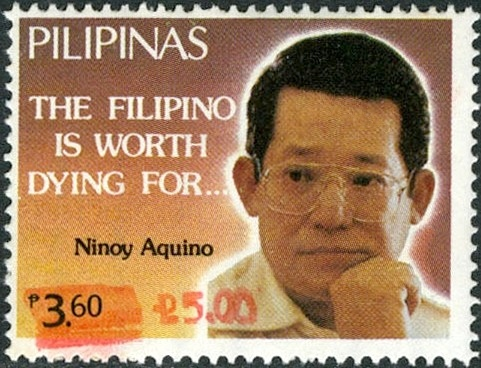
Ninoy Aquino on a 2000 stamp of the Philippines

Although Aquino was recognized as the most prominent and dynamic politician of his generation, in the years prior to martial law, many regarded him as a representative of the entrenched familial elite which to this day dominates Philippine politics. Telegenic and articulate, Aquino had his share of detractors and was not known to be immune to the ambitions and excesses of the ruling political class. However, during his seven years and seven months imprisoned as a criminal, Aquino read the book Born Again by convicted Watergate conspirator Charles Colson and it inspired him to a rude awakening.

As a result, the remainder of his personal and political life had a distinct spiritual sheen. He emerged as a contemporary counterpart of Jose Rizal, who was among the most vocal proponents of the use of non-violence to combat a repressive regime at the time, following the model of Mahatma Gandhi and Martin Luther King Jr.

Some oppositionist students who were active in the fight against the Marcos administration, including now-opposition Senator Risa Hontiveros, recount that at the time they had originally thought of Aquino as just another "traditional politician," but began to acknowledge he was more than that when he took the risk of returning to the Philippines, and ultimately paid for his choice with his life.

=== Monuments and memorials ===
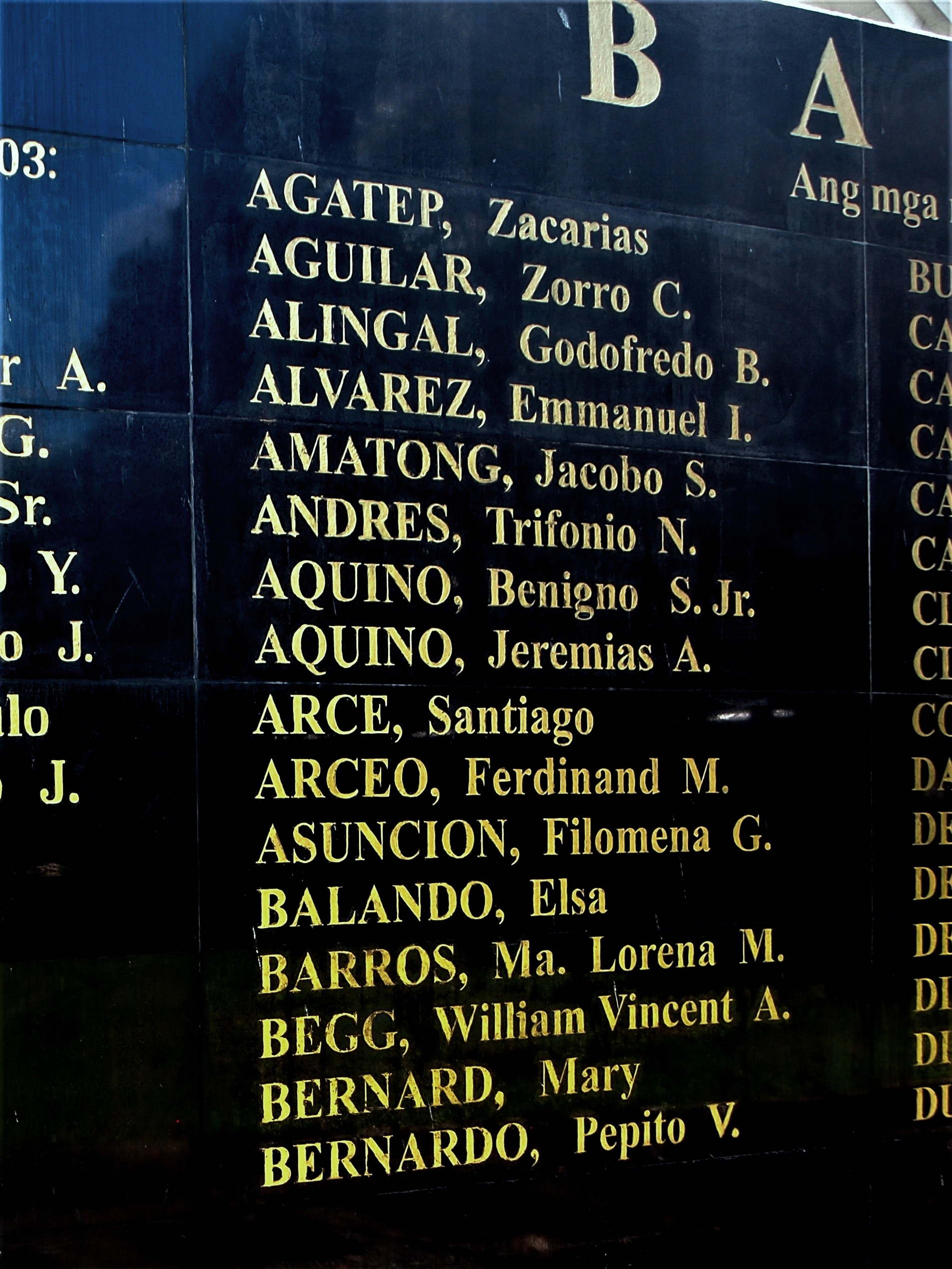
Detail of the Wall of Remembrance at the Bantayog ng mga Bayani in Quezon City, showing names from the first batch of Bantayog Honorees, including that of Ninoy Aquino.

Manila International Airport (MIA), where he was assassinated, was renamed Ninoy Aquino International Airport (NAIA) in 1987. Several schools, roads, and establishments, including the Ninoy Aquino Parks and Wildlife Center, were also named after him. His image has been featured on Philippine banknotes since August 21, 1987 with the New Design/BSP Series (demonetized January 3, 2018) and New Generation Currency Series (together with his wife Corazon Aquino) 500-peso note.

On February 25, 2004, President Gloria Macapagal Arroyo signed into law Republic Act No. 9256 on the 21st anniversary of his death as an annual special non-working holiday in the Philippines. In 2018, the Human Rights Victims’ Claims Board (HRVCB) formally recognised Aquino, his wife Corazon Aquino and 126 other individuals as a motu proprio victim of human rights violations committed under the Marcos Sr. dictatorship.

Several monuments were built in their honor. One of which is the bronze memorial at the intersection of Paseo de Roxas and Ayala Avenue in Makati. Another bronze statue stands in front of the Municipal Building of Concepcion, Tarlac. Other monuments include those at the People Power Monument in Quezon City, along his namesake avenue in Parañaque, in Tarlac City, and two others in Manila; at the Intramuros-side of Padre Burgos Avenue corner Roxas Boulevard, and around a kilometer down the aforementioned at Manila Baywalk opposite Pedro Gil Street.

Aquino was also among the first to be honored at the Bantayog ng mga Bayani, a monument dedicated to those who opposed the Marcos dictatorship, alongside fellow former senators Jose W. Diokno and Lorenzo Tañada.

The Ninoy Aquino Library and Learning Resources Center, the main university library of the Polytechnic University of the Philippines, was also named in his honor.

== Honors ==
National Honors

- : Quezon Service Cross – posthumous (August 21, 2004)
- : Commander of the Philippine Legion of Honor First Bronze Anahaw Leaf (1958), for serving as Presidential Assistant for the Garcia Administration,
- : Philippine Legion of Honor, Commander (Komandante) (1954) for negotiation of Luis Taruc's surrender to the Philippine Government.
- : Philippine Legion of Honor, Officer (Pinuno), 1950 for his service in reporting on the state of the Philippine troops in the Korean War
- : Order of the Knights of Rizal – Knight Grand Cross of Rizal. posthumous (1986)

International Honors

- Plaque of Appreciation from South Korea for the coverage of the Korean War
- Fellow, Harvard University for International Affairs – (1981–83)
- Fellow, Massachusetts Institute of Technology – (1981–83)

== Personal life ==
On October 11, 1954, he married Corazon Sumulong Cojuangco (Cory), with whom he had five children:

- Maria Elena ("Ballsy", born August 18, 1955), married to Eldon Cruz, with sons Justin Benigno (Jiggy) and Eldon Jr. (Jonty)
- Aurora Corazon ("Pinky", born December 27, 1957), married to Manuel Abellada, with son Miguel Gerardo (Miguel) and daughter Ana Corazon (Nina)
- Benigno Simeon III ("Noynoy", February 8, 1960 – June 24, 2021), the 15th President of the Philippines
- Victoria Elisa ("Viel", born October 27, 1961), married to Richard Joseph Dee, with son Francis Joseph (Kiko), and daughter Jacinta Patricia (Jia)
- Kristina Bernadette ("Kris", born February 14, 1971), formerly married to James Carlos Yap (annulled in 2012), with sons Joshua Philip Aquino Salvador (Josh) and James Carlos Aquino Yap Jr. (Bimby)

In a June 1981 interview with Pat Robertson on The 700 Club, Aquino said he was raised Catholic. According to him, his religious awakening began after reading Evangelical Christian author Charles Colson's 1976 book Born Again, during his solitary confinement under the Marcos regime.

=== In popular culture ===
Aquino was prominently featured in the 1988 Australian miniseries A Dangerous Life. Aquino was portrayed by Amado Cortez in the 1994 film Mayor Cesar Climaco. Then-Senator Raul Roco, who was part of Aquino's Senate legal staff, portrayed him for the 1997 film Ilaban Mo, Bayan Ko: The Obet Pagdanganan story. Then-Valenzuela Mayor Bobbit Carlos portrayed him in the 2003 biographical film Chavit: Blood Son of Ilocos. In 2005, director Carlo J. Caparas and his wife, producer Donna Villa, began plans to produce a film about Aquino's assassination from the soldiers' point of view, while actor Cesar Montano intended to produce a film based on Aquino's life starring himself, though both projects did not come to fruition. His nephew, former Senator Bam Aquino, portrayed him in the 2009 documentary film The Last Journey of Ninoy. He was also portrayed by Isko Moreno and Jerome Ponce in the 2022 film Martyr or Murderer, while in the same year JK Labajo portrayed him in the historical drama film Ako si Ninoy.

On television, Aquino was portrayed by Piolo Pascual on the two-part story of "The Ninoy & Cory Aquino Story" on Maalaala Mo Kaya in 2010, in the episodes entitled Kalapati and Makinilya.

In theater, Aquino was portrayed by Conrad Ricamora in the Off-Broadway and Seattle productions of the musical Here Lies Love. Ricamora reprises his role in the 2023 Broadway transfer of the musical.

Aquino wrote a 19-stanza poem for his wife Cory Aquino while in detention in 1973, entitled "I Have Fallen in Love with the Same Woman Three Times". The poem was made into a song by singer Jose Mari Chan and is included in his 1989 album Constant Change.

== See also ==
- Korea, a 1952 war film with a "story by" credit for Aquino.
- Aquinoism
- Benigno Aquino III

== Notes ==
Political offices
Preceded by Arsenio Lugay	Governor of Tarlac; 1961–1967	Succeeded by Eduardo Cojuangco Jr.
