= Aquino family =

Filipino political family

- Political family
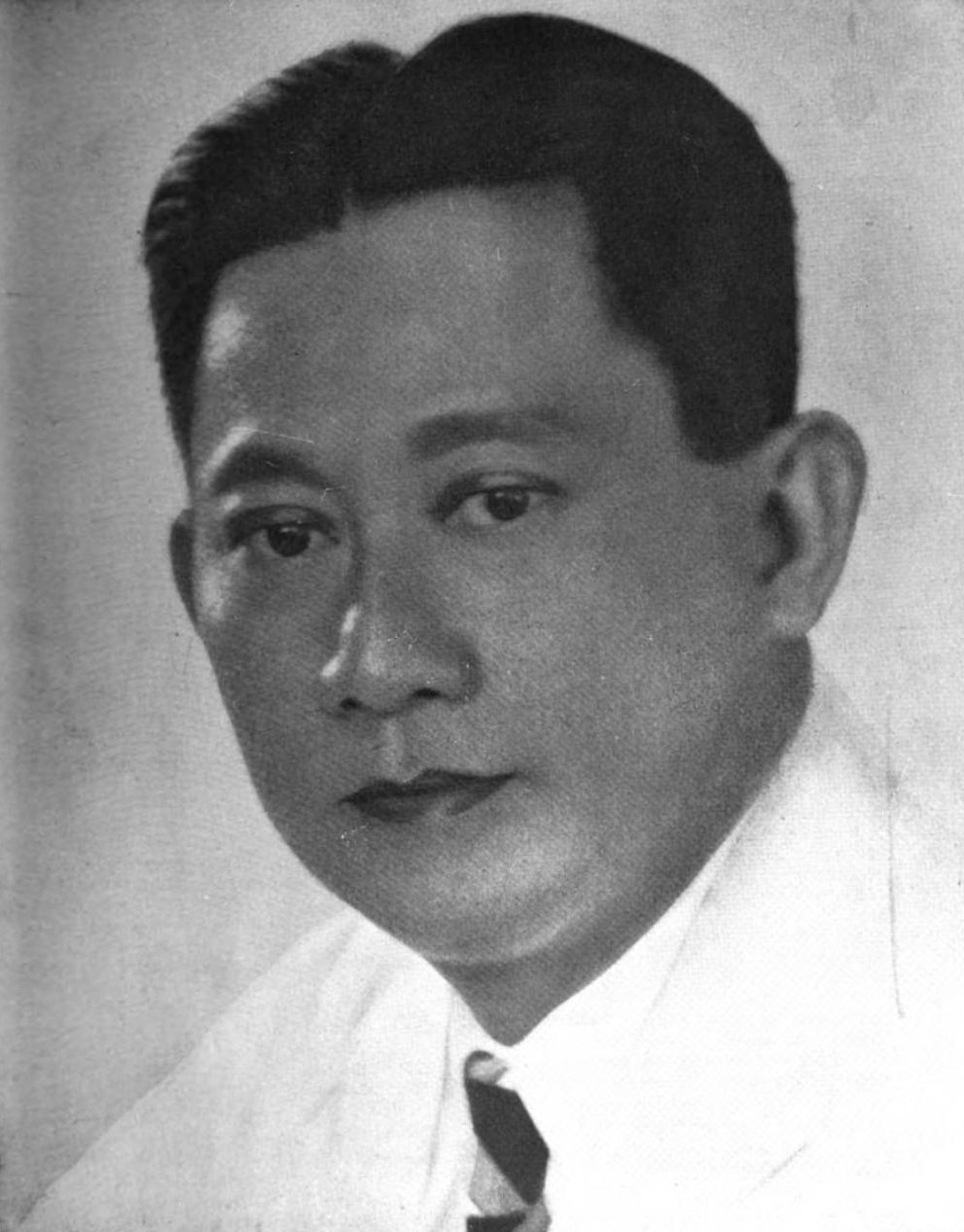
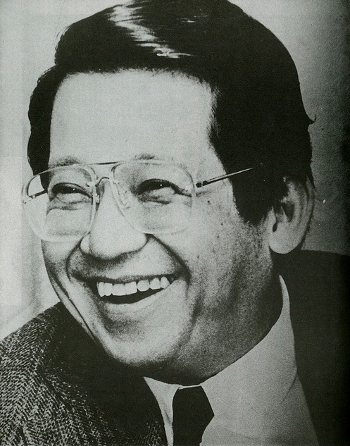
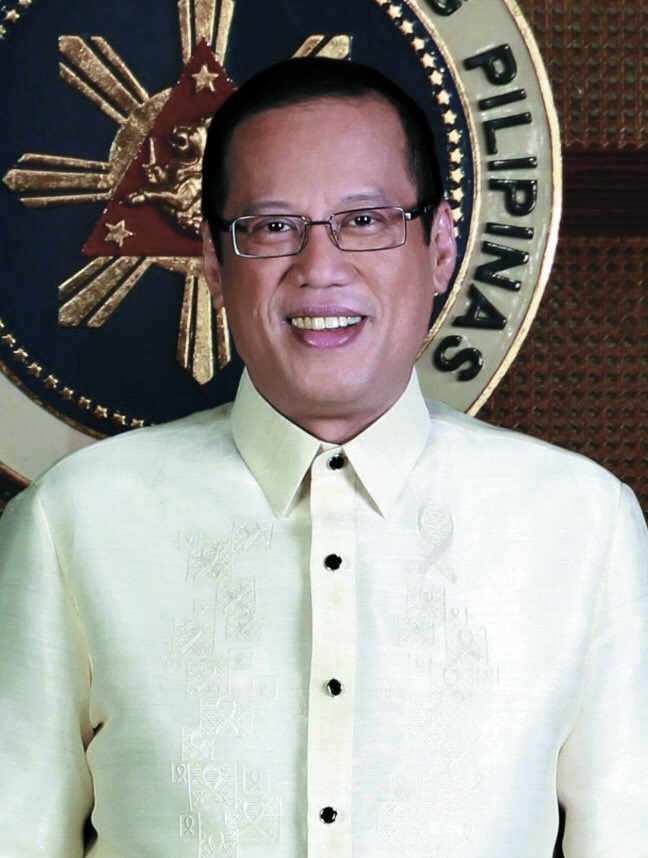
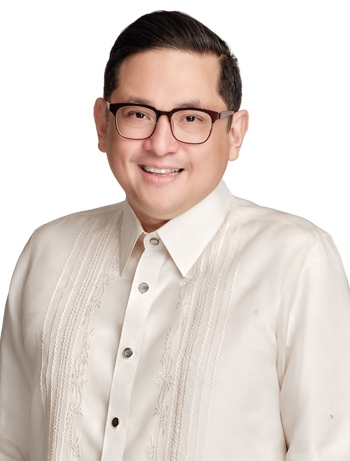
- Benigno Aquino Sr. Ninoy Aquino Benigno Aquino III Bam Aquino
- Country: Philippines
- Current region: Tarlac and Metro Manila, Philippines
- Origin: Angeles, Pampanga, Captaincy General of the Philippines
- Founded: September 15, 1898; 128 years ago
- Founder: Servillano Aquino
- Titles: List: President of the Philippines; Senator of the Philippines; Secretary of the Philippine Interior and Local Government; Secretary of Philippine Agriculture; Governor of Tarlac; Vice Governor of Tarlac; House Representative (Tarlac-2nd); House Representative (Tarlac-3rd); House Representative (Makati-2nd); House Representative (Malabon–Navotas's at-large); Mayor of Concepcion, Tarlac
- Members: List: Servillano Aquino; Benigno Aquino Sr.; Ninoy Aquino; Benigno Aquino III; Kris Aquino; Butz Aquino; Tessie Aquino-Oreta; Antolin Oreta III; Jesli Lapus; Jeci Lapus; Herminio Aquino; Bam Aquino; Kiko Aquino Dee; Bimby Aquino Yap and others
- Connected members: Corazon Aquino
- Connected families: Cojuangco
- Traditions: Roman Catholicism

The Aquino family (/əˈkiːnoʊ/, Tagalog: [ʔɐˈxiː.no]) is one of the most prominent families in the Philippines because of their involvement in politics. Some family members are also involved in other fields such as business and entertainment.

The family comes from Tarlac with Kapampangan descent and has produced several congressmen, senators, a vice governor, and two presidents. The head of the patriarch family is Servillano Aquino, who was a delegate to the Malolos Congress in 1898. His son, Benigno Aquino Sr., followed his footsteps as he represented the 2nd District of Tarlac to the House of Representatives of the Philippines (1916–1928) and to the Philippine Legislature by being a senator (1928–1934).

== History ==
=== Early political involvement ===
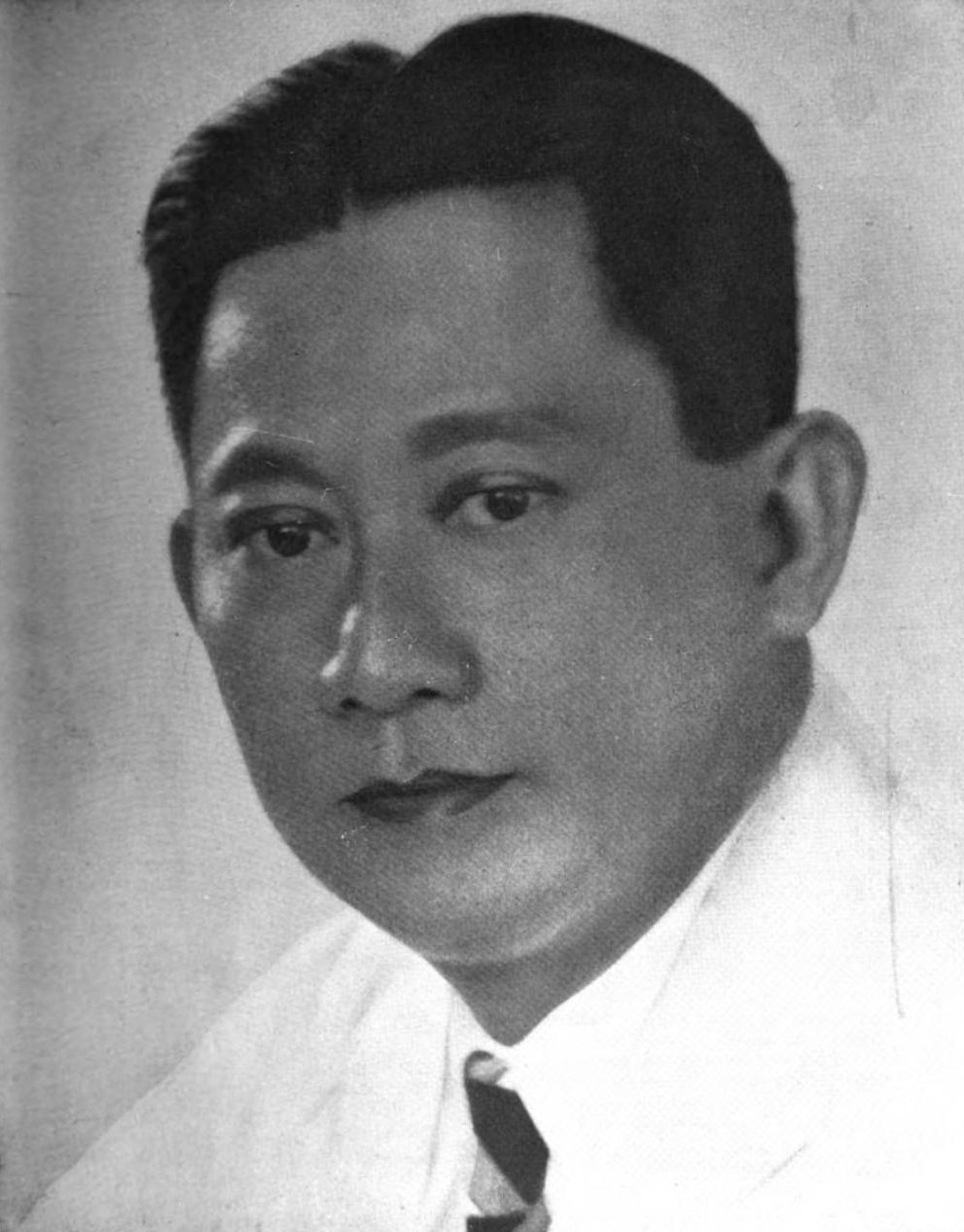
Benigno Aquino, Sr. serves as the 6th Speaker of the House of Representatives of the Philippines during the Second Philippine Republic.

The Aquino political dynasty began with Servillano "Mianong" Aquino y Aguilar (April 20, 1874 – February 3, 1959) who was a Filipino general during the Philippine Revolution against Spain (1896–1898), and the Philippine–American War (1898–1902). He served as a delegate to the Malolos Congress. He was born to Don Braulio Aquino y Lacsamana and Doña María Antonina Petrona Aguilar de Hipolito. He married Guadalupe Quiambao, with whom he had three children, Gonzalo (1893–??), future Philippine Senator Benigno (1894–1947), and Amando (1896–??). Later, he married his sister-in-law, Petronila Quiambao, to which he had a child, Fortunata (1905–??). Eventually, he married Belen Sanchez, and had a child with her, future Philippine Congressman Herminio (1949–2021).

In 1896, Mianong Aquino became a mason and joined the Katipunan. He was also elected mayor of Murcia, Tarlac and, under General Francisco Makabulos, he organized the Filipino revolutionary forces against the Americans. He was promoted to major, but was defeated in the battle at Mount Sinukuan in Arayat, Pampanga. After the Pact of Biak-na-Bato was signed, Aquino was exiled to Hong Kong together with Emilio Aguinaldo and the revolutionary government. He returned to the Philippines in 1898, and joined General Antonio Luna to fight against the American forces. Together they attacked Manila but retreated to Mount Sinukuan. In September 1902, he surrendered and was jailed in Bilibid Prison, and sentenced to hang. However, United States President Theodore Roosevelt gave Aquino a pardon after two years. On February 3, 1959, at the age of 84, Aquino died of a heart attack.

His son, Benigno Aquino Sr. (September 3, 1894 – December 20, 1947) served as a representative to the National Assembly (1919–1926), majority floor leader, and senator (1928). Igno Aquino was appointed member of the Council of State (1942), and speaker and director general of KALIBAPI (Kapisnan ng Paglilingkod sa Bayan). He is the father of Benigno “Ninoy” Aquino Jr. (November 27, 1932 – August 21, 1983).

Ninoy Aquino campaigned for Dr. Jose P. Laurel and later Ramon Magsaysay for the presidency. In 1954, he became the youngest municipal mayor at age 22. In the same year he married Corazon "Cory" Cojuangco, and they had five children; Maria Elena (Ballsy), Aurora Corazon (Pinky), Benigno Simeon III (Noynoy), Victoria Elisa (Viel), and Kristina Bernadette (Kris). He also became the nation's youngest vice-governor at 27. He became governor of Tarlac province in 1961 at age 29, then secretary-general of the Liberal Party in 1966. In 1967 he made history by becoming the youngest elected senator in the country's history at age 34. Ninoy was also a leading opponent of the rule of President Ferdinand Marcos (1917–1989). When martial law was declared in 1972, Ninoy was immediately imprisoned and placed in a solitary cell for about eight years, until Marcos allowed him to leave for heart surgery in the United States. Upon his return to the Philippines three years later, he was murdered at the national airport, before he had stepped out onto the tarmac. Who ordered the assassination is not known to this day, but his sympathizers put the blame on the dictator Ferdinand Marcos and voted for his widow, Cory, in the snap election of February 1986.

=== Ninoy Aquino's opposition to the Marcos regime ===
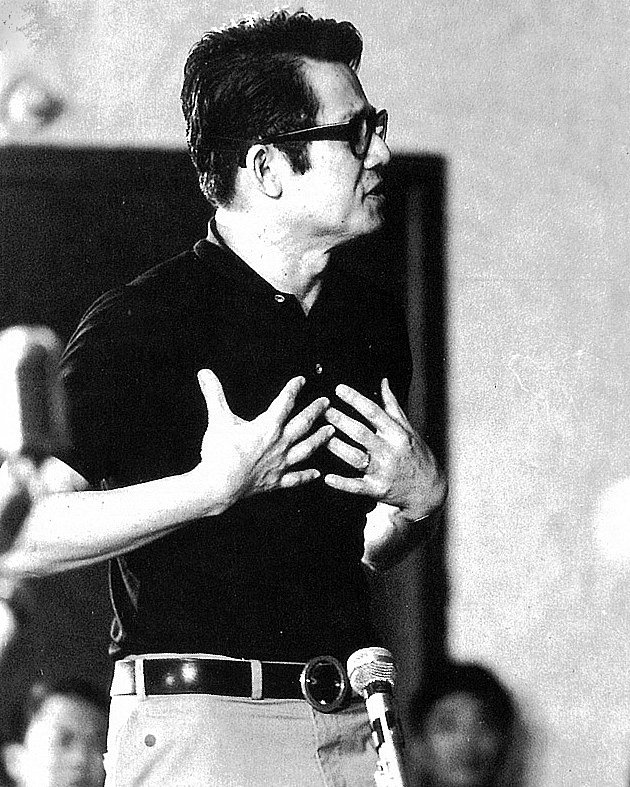
Ninoy Aquino was the leading opposition leader during the Marcos dictatorship.

In 1968, during his first year in the Upper House, Ninoy Aquino warned that Marcos was on the road to establishing "a garrison state" by "ballooning the armed forces budget", saddling the defense establishment with "overstaying generals" and "militarizing our civilian government offices".

Aquino's speech, "A Pantheon for Imelda", delivered on February 10, 1969, assailed the First Lady's first extravagant project, the P50 million Cultural Center of the Philippines, which he dubbed "a monument to shame". These so-called "fiscalization" tactics of Aquino quickly became his trademark in the senate.

It was not until the Plaza Miranda bombing on August 21, 1971, that the pattern of direct confrontation between Marcos and Aquino emerged.

Later, the Marcos government presented evidence of the bombings as well as an alleged threat of a communist insurgency, suggesting that the bombings were the handiwork of the growing New People's Army. Marcos made this a pretext to suspend the Writ of Habeas Corpus, vowed that the killers would be apprehended within 48 hours, and arrested a score of known "Maoists" on general principle. Ironically, the police captured one of the bombers, who was identified as a sergeant of the firearms and explosive section of the Philippine Constabulary, a military arm of the government. According to Aquino, this man was later snatched from police custody by military personnel and never heard from again.

President Marcos declared martial law on September 21, 1972, and he went on air to broadcast his declaration on midnight of September 23. Aquino was one of the first to be arrested and imprisoned on trumped-up charges of murder, illegal possession of firearms and subversion. On April 4, 1975, Aquino announced that he was going on a hunger strike, a fast to the death to protest the injustices of his military trial. On May 13, 1975, on the 40th day, his family and several priests and friends, begged him to end his fast. He acquiesced, confident that he had made a symbolic gesture. But at 10:25 p.m. on November 25, 1977, the government-controlled Military Commission No. 2 headed by Major-General Jose Syjuco found Ninoy guilty of all charges and he was sentenced to death by firing squad. However, Aquino and many others believed that Marcos, ever the shrewd strategist, would not let him suffer a death that would surely make Ninoy Aquino a martyr.

In 1978, from his prison cell, Aquino was allowed to take part in the elections for Interim Batasang Pambansa (Parliament). Although his friends, former senators Gerry Roxas and Jovito Salonga preferred to boycott the elections, Aquino urged his supporters to organize and run 21 candidates in Metro Manila. Thus his political party, dubbed Lakas ng Bayan (People's Power), was born. The party's acronym was "LABAN" (the word laban means "fight" in the Filipino language, Tagalog). He was allowed one television interview on Face the Nation (hosted by Ronnie Nathanielsz) and proved to a startled and impressed populace that imprisonment had neither dulled his rapier-like tongue nor dampened his fighting spirit. Foreign correspondents and diplomats asked what would happen to the LABAN ticket. People agreed with him that his party would win overwhelmingly in an honest election. Not surprisingly, all his candidates lost due to widespread election fraud.

In mid-March 1980, Ninoy suffered a heart attack, possibly the result of seven years in prison, mostly in a solitary cell which must have taken a heavy toll on his gregarious personality. The surgeons were reluctant to do a coronary bypass because of their unwillingness to be involved in a controversy. Additionally, Ninoy refused to submit himself to the hands of local doctors, fearing possible Marcos "duplicity", preferring to either go to the United States for the procedure or to return to his cell at Fort Bonifacio and die.

On May 8, 1980, Imelda Marcos made an unannounced visit to Ninoy at his hospital room. She asked him if he would like to leave that evening for the U.S., but not before agreeing on two covenants: first, that if he leaves, he will not return; and, second, while in America, he should not speak out against the Marcos regime. She then ordered General Fabian C. Ver and Mel Mathay to make necessary arrangements for passports and plane tickets for the Aquino family. Aquino was rushed to his home on Times Street to pack, hustled to the airport and put on a plane bound for the U.S. that same day accompanied by his family. Aquino was operated on at a hospital in Dallas, Texas. He made a quick recovery, was walking within two weeks and making plans to fly to Damascus, Syria, to contact Muslim leaders, which he did five weeks later. When he reiterated that he was returning to the Philippines, he received a surreptitious message from the Marcos government saying that he was now granted an extension of his "medical furlough". Eventually, he decided to renounce his two covenants with Malacañang "because of the dictates of higher national interest". After all, Aquino added, "a pact with the devil is no pact at all".

Aquino traveled extensively in the U.S. delivering speeches critical of the Marcos government. Marcos and his officials, aware of Aquino's growing popularity even in his absence, in turn accused Aquino of being the "mad bomber" and allegedly masterminding a rash of bombings that had rocked Metro Manila in 1981 and 1982. Aquino denied that he was advocating a bloody revolution, but warned that radicalized oppositionists were threatening to use violence soon. He urged Marcos to "heed the voice of conscience and moderation", and declared himself willing to lay his own life on the line. After 3 years in exile, Aquino returned on August 21, 1983, and was shot on the tarmac of Manila International Airport.

=== Ascension in power of Corazon Aquino ===
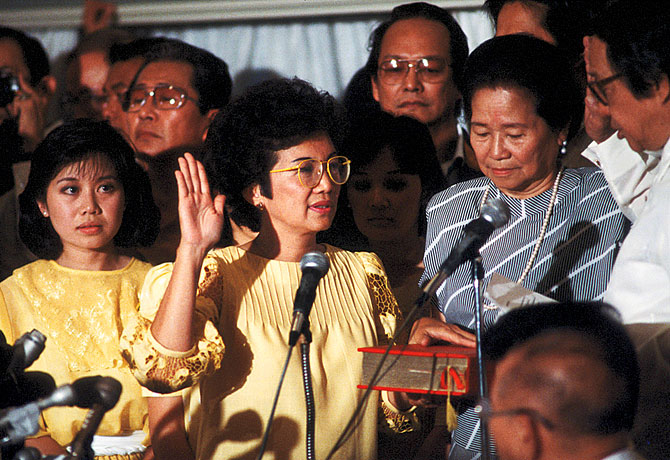
Corazon Aquino assumed the mantle as leader of the Philippine opposition and assumed the presidency in the aftermath of the People Power Revolution in 1986.

Before 1972, Benigno “Ninoy” Aquino, Jr., was known for his criticisms of the Marcos regime. His public criticisms caused him to be constantly shown in media, and was eventually loved by the Filipino people. It didn't come as a surprise then that when Marcos declared Martial Law in 1972, Ninoy was one of the first among many oppositions that were unjustly arrested. Eleven years later, on August 21, 1983, he was allegedly assassinated whom until to this day is unknown. This assassination caused the uprising of the Filipino people, and at the same time, the pressure on Corazon “Cory” Aquino to take the place of her late husband.

Initially, Cory was hesitant to participate in politics. For one, she was inexperienced and did not know much about Philippine politics. Two, she was being thrust into the position of president – the highest position in the state. After spending a day in isolation in a church, Cory then decided that she will run for presidency against Marcos, who declared a snap election. At the start of her campaign, Cory was criticized by Marcos for being “just a woman” who did not know anything about politics – which was true. At first, Cory relied heavily on her aides and advisers to answer questions regarding political issues. On December 16, in an interview with The New York Times, she said “What on earth do I know about being a President?”. This led to the doubts of political commentators on her capability to lead the nation. However, as the elections were nearing, Cory started to learn more about politics, stating that “I'm getting so many crash courses at this point in my life.” At the same time, she was getting the support from the different classes in the Philippines. The Catholic Church, through Cardinal Sin, vouched for her, and ultimately gave her the support and the vote of the religious. The middle class too sided with Cory because of the constricting rules implemented by Marcos. Lastly, the intellectuals sided with Cory because they wanted to join the government under Cory's rule. On February 7, 1986, Cory won the snap election despite Marcos’ cheating in the election process. However, COMELEC fraudulently declared Marcos victorious on February 15. This led to the uprising of the people who supported Cory, with the addition of some of the low-ranking military officers. These officers, under Juan Ponce Enrile, defected because of the nepotism shown by Marcos in promoting military personnel. When Cardinal Sin called out to the Filipinos to flood EDSA on behalf of Cory, millions of Filipinos came and peacefully rallied in EDSA. This movement by the people was met with tanks from the government. At this point, the Philippines became the center focus of international media. This event, now known as the People Power Revolution, led to the defection of Marcos’ allies, even in the US, and eventually the departing of Marcos himself on February 26, 1986.

=== Death of Corazon Aquino and election of Benigno Aquino III as president ===
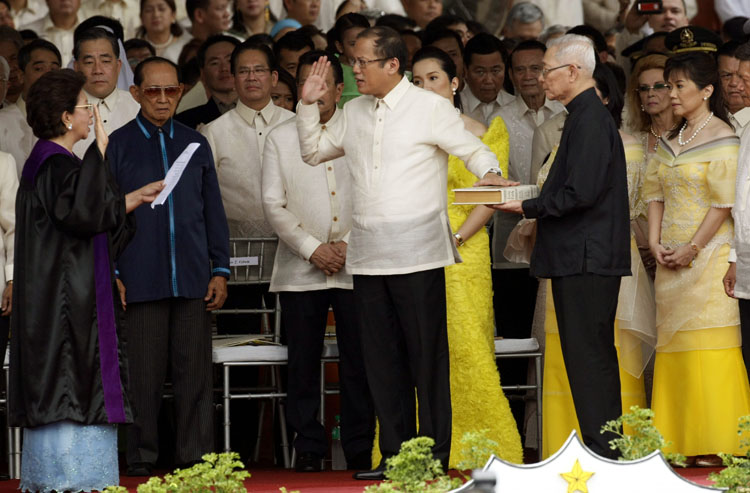
Benigno Aquino III takes the oath of office as the 15th president of the Philippines in 2010.

Cory Aquino, age 75, was diagnosed with colon cancer on 2008. In a span of 16 months, the disease had spread to her other organs, which resulted to the weakening of her body. After being confined and treated with chemotherapy for a month in a hospital in Manila, her body became too weak to continue the chemotherapy. On August 1, 2009, Cory died due to cardio-respiratory arrest.

After Cory's death, people from different groups called on Noynoy to run during the upcoming 2010 presidential elections. Forty days after his mother's death, Noynoy Aquino announced that he will run for presidency, and that he will follow the footsteps of his parents in leading the nation should he win the election.

Before Noynoy Aquino became a senator in 2007, he was a congressman from Tarlac from 1998 to 2007. In his three terms, he filed 21 bills. In May 2007, he ran for Senator and won, placing 6th in the national elections. He chairs the Senate Committee on Local Government, and is also the vice-chairperson of the Committee on Justice and Human Rights. He had been determined to ensure that his key legislative initiatives would bear fruit and to see them through until the end of his term.

He concentrated on crafting laws that would help create opportunity rather than impose additional burdens to those who are already disadvantaged. He actively took part in budget deliberations to ensure that government initiatives do address the plight of the people who need help the most. He introduced reforms on the Philippine education program by introducing the K-12 curriculum by signing into law the Enhanced Basic Education Act in 2013. This added two years to the basic education system; which became known as the Senior High School stage. Under his presidency, the nation's economy grew at the highest rates in decades, and the country was dubbed a "Rising Tiger" economy.

Even at this point, his performance still remained indistinguishable. Noynoy's name only appeared once again when her mother, Cory Aquino, died on August 1, 2009, in which the whole nation mourned over. On September 9, 2009, in Club Filipino in Greenhills, he announced that he will continue the fight of his parents, and run for presidency under the Liberal Party. The main slogan of his campaign was “Daang matuwid”, and, “If there were no corrupt, there would be no poor.”, as a way to allege himself with his parents who fought and stood by the same principle. Majority of his campaign stratagem were designed to portray Noynoy as the son of Ninoy Aquino, considered to be the Filipino political martyr, and Cory Aquino, the woman who brought back democracy in the Philippines. He used the color and symbol of Ninoy and Cory, the yellow ribbon, to present himself as their scion that would continue their cause towards proper governance. With this affiliation to his parents, Noynoy won the May 2010 presidential elections by 15 million votes.

=== Legacy ===
Today, various tributes and monuments were made for the Aquino family's role in the People Power Revolution. In 1987, Through Republic Act No. 6639, Manila International Airport was renamed to Ninoy Aquino International Airport, where Senator Aquino was assassinated. Large statues of both Ninoy and Cory were erected throughout the country.

Controversies are also attributed to the family, however. Amid decades-long calls for genuine land reform, Congress under President Corazon Aquino approved the law creating the Comprehensive Agrarian Reform Program (CARP); but it was widely considered to be ineffective. Some have criticized her intentions on land distribution, considering her belonging to the Cojuangco clan, owners of the Hacienda Luisita, a 6000-hectare sugar plantation in Tarlac. She had a share of the stocks of the hacienda's corporation along with her siblings until she bequeathed them to her children and other entities at the start of her presidency. The hacienda was spared from actual distribution for farmer beneficiaries under CARP.

Disputes arose in the past years between the management of the hacienda and the workers as they demanded better working conditions and benefits. The dispersal by police and military on a 6000-strong worker's strike in November 2004 led to the so-called Hacienda Luisita massacre, killing at least 7 people and injuring hundreds, and drawing condemnation. Then-congressman Benigno Aquino III condemned the killings but defended the dispersal of the "illegal" strike.

== Relations with other prominent families ==
=== Roxas family ===
Benigno Aquino Sr. and Manuel A. Roxas had a close relationship that they would call each other compadres. They started out as rivals when Roxas, under Sergio Osmeña's mentorship and Aquino, under Manuel L. Quezon's orders, were going against each other in the issue regarding the Hare-Hawes-Cutting Campaigns. Both eventually started cooperating with one another. Both had started a joint mining corporation and became partners in a law firm. In addition, even their children called the other party tito as a sign of respect and closeness.

Their sons, Benigno “Ninoy” Aquino Jr. and Gerardo "Gerry" Roxas, along with Jovito R. Salonga, helped each other in their respective fields. Both Ninoy Aquino and Gerry Roxas were political stars of their time. They also became senators in the 1967 elections under the Liberal Party. Salonga acted as the bridge between Gerry Roxas and Ninoy Aquino. They were co-politicians who were friends but also had a few major issues. Salonga guided Ninoy and Gerry with their political careers. He had helped Ninoy in his campaign for Senate as he was receiving cases against him due to his age qualification. Salonga, along with other lawyers, had to defend Ninoy's case of being a year younger than the required age during the elections but would be enough during the proclamation of the winner. He also helped Gerry become the Liberal Party President in the 1967 elections.

In the 2010 elections, Mar Roxas, the son of Gerry Roxas, stepped down from vying for presidency as the LP presidential candidate to give way to Noynoy Aquino. When Noynoy Aquino won as the president, he appointed Mar Roxas to head the Department of Transportation and Communications (DOTC) in June 2011 and later on as head of the Department of the Interior and Local Government (DILG) in August 2012.

=== Cojuangco family ===
The two political families were joined by the marriage of Corazon Cojuangco and Benigno "Ninoy" Aquino Jr. The Cojuangcos, who gained their wealth due to the continuous acquisition of land from farmers who cannot pay debts, became powerful enough to rule the northern part of Tarlac. The Aquinos on the other hand, became known for the positions held by family members. Ninoy, his father and his grandfather, held important positions in the government. For example, Ninoy's father, and Cory's father, were both congressmen, while Ninoy held the position of Mayor of Concepcion at the age of 22. When Ninoy and Cory married in 1954, their combined families became one dominant political family whose members continued to acquire positions, not only in politics, but also in business.

== Notable members ==
Image	Name	Description
	Servillano Aquino	General during the Philippine Revolution and the Philippine–American War
	Herminio Aquino	Vice Governor of Tarlac from 1998 to 2001 and representative from the third district of Tarlac from 1987 to 1998
	Benigno Aquino Sr.	Speaker of the National Assembly of the Japanese-sponsored puppet state in the Philippines from 1943 to 1944
	Ninoy Aquino	Governor of Tarlac from 1961 to 1967 and Senator of the Philippines from 1967 to 1972
	Benigno Aquino III	15th President of the Philippines
	Kris Aquino	Television presenter, actress, talent manager and film producer
	Bimby Aquino Yap	Media personality and former child actor
	Kiko Aquino Dee	Political scientist and son of Viel Aquino-Dee
	Butz Aquino	Actor, Senator of the Philippines from 1987 to 1998 and representative from the second district of Makati from 1998 to 2007
	Tessie Aquino-Oreta	Representative from Malabon–Navotas from 1987 to 1998 and Senator of the Philippines from 1998 to 2004
	Antolin Oreta III	Vice Mayor of Malabon from 2010 to 2012, Mayor of Malabon from 2012 to 2022 and representative from Malabon since 2025
	Jeci Lapus	Representative from the third district of Tarlac from 2007 to 2013
	Jesli Lapus	Representative from the third district of Tarlac from 1998 to 2006, 34th Secretary of the Education and 49th Secretary of the Trade and Industry
	Bam Aquino	Senator of the Philippines from 2013 to 2019; 2025–present

== Genealogy ==
This diagram shows the historical ancestry of the Aquino family, from Servillano Aquino's generation to the present day Aquino of the Philippines today.
