= 2001 Makati local elections =

3rd City elections in Makati

2001 Makati mayoral election
- May 14, 2001
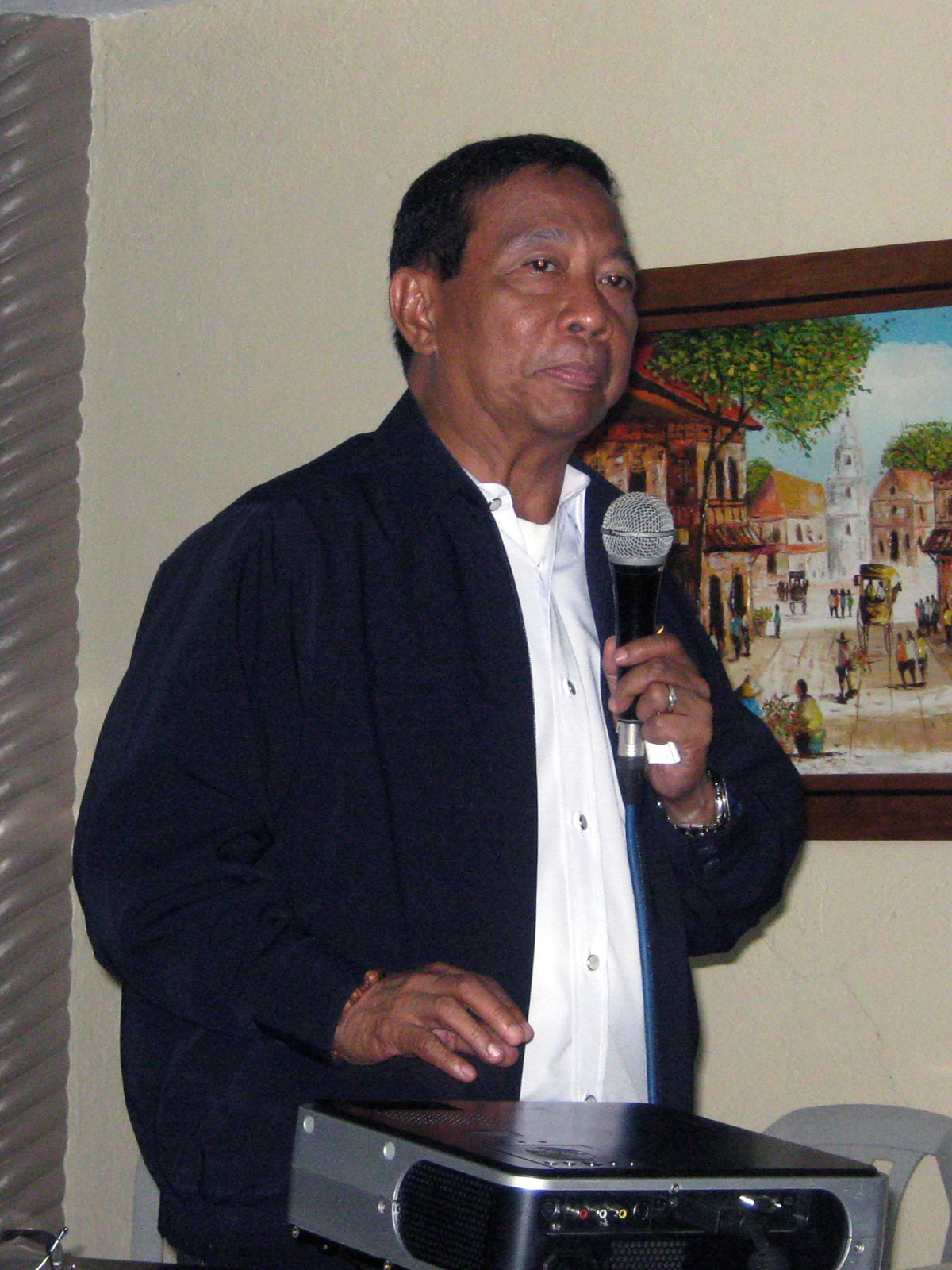

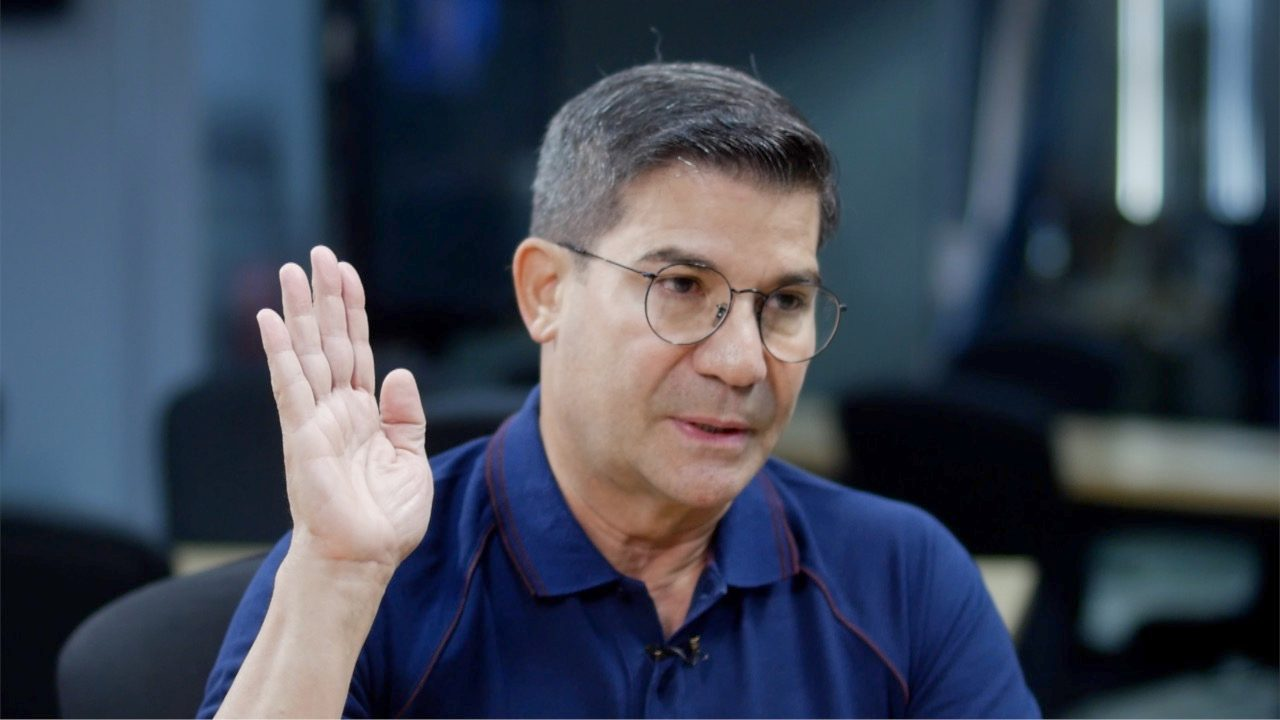
Nominee	Jejomar Binay	Edu Manzano
Party	PDP–Laban	Lakas
Alliance	Performance Team	Team Edu Manzano
Running mate	Ernesto S. Mercado	Robert Dean Barbers
Popular vote	137,030	71,067
Percentage	65.49	34.06
Mayor before election
Elenita Binay
PDP–Laban
Elected mayor
Jejomar Binay
PDP–Laban
- Vice mayoral election
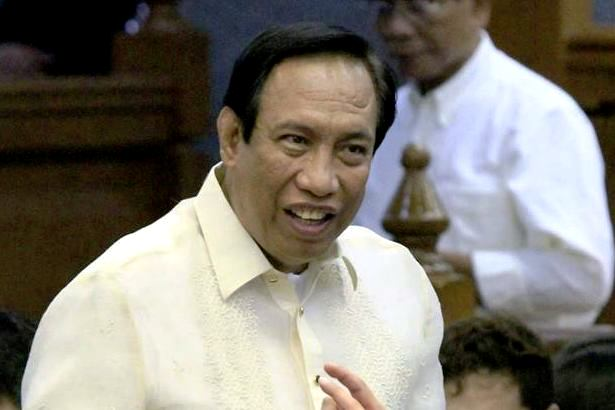

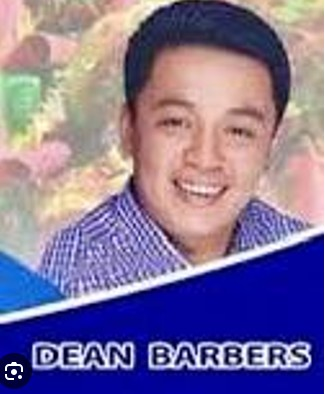
Candidate	Ernesto S. Mercado	Robert Dean Barbers
Party	PDP–Laban	Lakas
Alliance	Performance Team	Team Edu Manzano
Popular vote	115,696	87,373
Percentage	56.97	43.03
Vice Mayor before election
Edu Manzano
Liberal
Elected Vice Mayor
Ernesto Mercado
PDP–Laban

Local elections was held in the City of Makati on May 14, 2001, within the Philippine general election. The voters elected for the elective local posts in the city: the mayor, vice mayor, the two congressmen, and the councilors, eight in each of the city's two legislative districts.

== Background ==
Former MMDA chairman and PDP–Laban president Jejomar Binay sought a mayoral comeback in place of his wife, the incumbent mayor Elenita Binay as the candidate of PDP–Laban. He selected former councilor and 1998 vice mayoralry candidate Ernesto Mercado as running-mate. Binay faced incumbent Vice Mayor and actor Edu Manzano, who joined Lakas–NUCD with selection of city councilor Robert Dean Barbers as running mate. Barbers is the son of then-Senator Robert Barbers.

There are rumors spreading that Binay's camp offered Manzano to back-out of race, with estimated amount of ₱50 million. In those rumors of offering him to back-out, Manzano did not disclose the amount, while Binay pointed out that Manzano was the one who wanted to join their slate backed by PDP–Laban. If ever Manzano wants to join them, they can't give him a spot, especially when the party's stalwart and former Cory Aquino's speechwriter Teddy Boy Locsin is running for the 1st district.

Nemesio "Toro" Yabut III, the incumbent mayor's opponent in 1998 election, supported former mayor Binay's candidacy.

Makati is also welcomed some senatorial candidates from both camps. The LDP-Puwersa ng Masa’s candidates who came to the rally were Jamby Madrigal, Santanina Rasul and Orlando Mercado. The People Power Coalition have incumbent senator Sergio Osmena III, and longtime Makati City congressman and senatorial candidate Joker Arroyo were also there.

Binay's camp was the one who have been favored to win the election, while Manzano's slate still confident that they can still win. There are also tirades, as said by Binay that the opposition did not have any comprehensive program of government, and is instead waging "a campaign of lies and character assassination" against him. Binay blasted the opposition against him by saying that Makati citizens knows difference between performance and puro porma lang. Puro porma lang that Binay saying that Manzano was only using his "popularity" as an actor.

Iglesia ni Cristo endorsed Binay and Mercado, with the whole slate (including Rico J. Puno), but Manzano shrugged it off as the religious sect did not endorsed him in his 1998 vice mayoral campaign. Manzano also said that letting the people decide of election rather than of a vote bloc endorsement is better.

Both camps pointed each other that they doing vote buying and violation election laws. That issue promoted Makati police to interfere.

== Candidates ==
=== Performance Team ===
PDP–Laban/Aksyon Demokratiko/Nacionalista Party/Laban ng Demokratikong Pilipino/Performance Team
Name	Party
For Mayor
Jejomar "Jojo" C. Binay	PDP–Laban
For Vice Mayor
Ernesto "Nestor" S. Mercado	PDP–Laban
For House Of Representative (1st District)
Teodoro "Teddy Boy" L. Locsin Jr.	PDP–Laban
For Councilor (1st District)
Jejomar Erwin "Junjun" S. Binay Jr.	PDP–Laban
Oscar M. Ibay	PDP–Laban
Ferdinand Jacinto "Ferdie Tangol" T. Eusebio	PDP–Laban
Ricardo "Ric" S. Javier	PDP–Laban
Enrico "Rico J." Puno	PDP–Laban
Romeo "Romy" C. Medina	Aksyon
Erlinda "Linda" S. Gonzales	PDP–Laban
Francisco Z. Lichauco	PDP–Laban
For House Of Representative (2nd District)
Agapito "Butz" A. Aquino	LDP
For Councilor (2nd District)
Israel "Boyet" S. Cruzado	Independent
Salvador "Buddy" D. Pangilinan	PDP–Laban
Nelson "Doc" S. Pasia	PDP–Laban
Elias "Boy" V. Tolentino	LDP
Johnny S. Wilson	Nacionalista
Divina "Divine" A. Jacome	PDP–Laban
Liberato "Levi" G. Siaron	PDP–Laban
Astolfo C. Pimentel	PDP–Laban

=== Team Edu Manzano ===
Lakas-NUCD-UMDP/Team Edu Manzano
Name	Party
For Mayor
Eduardo Luis "Edu" B. Manzano	Lakas
For Vice Mayor
Robert Dean Barbers	Lakas
For House Of Representative (1st District)
Melinda Silverio	Lakas
For Councilor (1st District)
Mark P. Joseph	Lakas
Zeno "Nonoy" O. Zuñiga	Lakas
Gabriel "Bong" V. Daza III	Lakas
Joshua John C. Santiago	Lakas
John J. Arenas	Lakas
Miguel C. Lopez Jr.	Lakas
Glenn C. Enciso	Lakas
Otelio K. Jochico	Lakas
For House Of Representative (2nd District)
AnaLuz "Atty. Luz" B. Cristal-Tenorio	Lakas
For Councilor (2nd District)
Antonio "Tony" G. Manalili	Lakas
Elena B. Maccay	Lakas
Erlinda "Dr. Linda" C. Usabal	Lakas
Alicia "Alice" D. Paraan	Lakas
Rolando "Rolly" T. Torrente	Lakas
Napoleon "Nap" M. Malimas	Lakas
Mischa Nicanor "Nick" B. Elman	Lakas
Blanquita S. Fitzpatrick	Lakas

=== Independent Candidates ===
Independent
Name	Party
For Mayor
Reynaldo Ocampo	Independent
For Vice Mayor
Felicisimo P. Bascon Jr.	Independent
For House Of Representative (1st District)
Romeo de Belen	Independent
For Councilor (1st District)
Roberto S. Pangan	Independent
Ronnie O. Mendoza	Independent
Jose A. Brozoto	Independent
For House Of Representative (2nd District)
Sherwin Dimacali	Independent
Rizalito David	Independent
For Councilor (2nd District)
Roberto "Bobby" S. Brillante Sr.	Independent
Eliseo G. Baldeviso	Independent

=== Other Non-Independent Candidates ===
Partido ng Masang Pilipino
Name	Party
For House of Representative (1st district)
Armida Siguion-Reyna	PMP

== Results ==
=== For mayor ===
Incumbent mayor Elenita Binay opted not to seek re-election. Her husband, former mayor Jejomar Binay, won against incumbent Vice Mayor Edu Manzano.

Makati mayoral election
Party	Candidate	Votes	%
PDP–Laban	Jejomar Binay	137,030	65.49
Lakas	Edu Manzano	71,067	34.06
Independent	Reynaldo Ocampo	942	0.45
Total votes		209,039	100.00
PDP–Laban hold			

=== For vice mayor ===
Former councilor and vice mayoral candidate Ernesto Mercado won against 1st District councilor Robert Dean Barbers and former ABC Chairman Felicisimo Bascon Jr.

Makati vice mayoral election
Party	Candidate	Votes	%
PDP–Laban	Ernesto "Nestor" Mercado	115,696	56.97
Lakas	Robert Dean Barbers	87,373	43.03
Independent	Felicisimo Bascon Jr.	1,203	0.59
Total votes		204,488	100.00
PDP–Laban gain from Lakas			

=== For 1st district congressman ===
Incumbent Joker Arroyo is term-limited and has decided to run for senator. Journalist Teodoro Locsin Jr. won against former MTRCB chairperson Armida Siguion-Reyna (PMP), Lakas candidate Melinda Silverio, and independent candidate Romeo de Belen.

Makati 1st district representative election
Party	Candidate	Votes	%
PDP–Laban	Teodoro Locsin Jr.	61,012	62.23
PMP	Armida Siguion-Reyna	23,146	23.61
Lakas	Melinda Silverio	12,585	12.84
Independent	Romeo de Belen	1,295	1.32
Total votes		98,038	100.00
PDP–Laban gain from Lakas			

=== For 2nd district congressman ===
Butz Aquino won his re-election bid against lawyer and 2nd District Councilor Ana Luz Cristal-Tenorio (Lakas), and independent candidates Sherwin Dimacali and Rizalito David.

Makati 2nd district representative election
Party	Candidate	Votes	%
LDP	Butz Aquino	56,737	63.37
Lakas	Ana Luz "Atty. Luz" Cristal-Tenorio	31,883	35.61
Independent	Sherwin Dimacali	894	1.00
Independent	Rizalito David	17	0.02
Total votes		89,531	100.00
LDP hold			

=== City Council ===
All sixteen candidates of Binay-Mercado slate won the city council seats, eight per district.

==== 1st District ====
City Council election at Makati's 1st district
Party	Candidate	Votes	%
PDP–Laban	Oscar M. Ibay	69,952	
PDP–Laban	Jejomar Erwin "Junjun" S. Binay Jr.	64,329	
PDP–Laban	Ferdinand Jacinto "Ferdie Tangol" T. Eusebio	59,163	
PDP–Laban	Ricardo "Ric" S. Javier	58,892	
PDP–Laban	Enrico "Rico J." Puno	57,642	
Aksyon	Romeo "Romy" C. Medina	57,597	
PDP–Laban	Erlinda "Linda" S. Gonzales	55,246	
PDP–Laban	Francisco Z. Lichauco	47,282	
Lakas	Zeno "Nonoy" O. Zuñiga	44,432	
Lakas	Mark P. Joseph	41,072	
Lakas	Gabriel "Bong" V. Daza III	33,506	
Lakas	Joshua John C. Santiago	32,650	
Lakas	John J. Arenas	26,628	
Lakas	Miguel C. Lopez Jr.	21,745	
Lakas	Glenn C. Enciso	20,790	
Lakas	Otelio K. Jochico	14,585	
Independent	Roberto S. Pangan	8,267	
Independent	Ronnie O. Mendoza	4,084	
Independent	Jose A. Brozoto	1,816	
Total votes			

==== 2nd District ====
City Council election at Makati's 2nd district
Party	Candidate	Votes	%
PDP–Laban	Salvador "Buddy" D. Pangilinan	65,411	
PDP–Laban	Nelson "Doc" S. Pasia	63,664	
Nacionalista	Johnny S. Wilson	63,486	
LDP	Elias "Boy" V. Tolentino	62,176	
PDP–Laban	Divina "Divine" A. Jacome	61,776	
Independent	Israel "Boyet" S. Cruzado	60,494	
PDP–Laban	Liberato "Levi" G. Siaron	56,574	
PDP–Laban	Astolfo C. Pimentel	55,102	
Lakas	Elena B. Maccay	38,228	
Lakas	Antonio "Tony" G. Manalili	30,330	
Independent	Roberto "Bobby" G. Brillante Sr.	22,299	
Lakas	Erlinda "Dr. Linda" C. Usabal	19,643	
Lakas	Napoleon "Nap" M. Malimas	17,682	
Lakas	Alicia "Alice" D. Paraan	17,297	
Lakas	Rolando "Rolly" T. Torrente	17,281	
Lakas	Mischa Nicanor "Nick" B. Elman	16,384	
Lakas	Bianquita S. Fitzpatrick	7,684	
Independent	Eliseo G. Baldeviso	6,204	
Total votes			
