= Iglesia ni Cristo and Philippine elections =

Church relations to elections

The Iglesia ni Cristo (INC) is known for its practice of bloc voting during elections. The INC is known for issuing directives to vote for certain candidates endorsed by the church under the tenet of obedience and the advocacy of a united unit. INC spokesperson Edwil Zabala has stressed the importance of unity of its members with the church leadership. As a consequence, candidates often attempt to secure endorsement from the INC. This so-called "Unity Vote" is justified by the INC as one of their "great powers" (dakilang kapangyarihan), explained as such in their official publication Pasugo: "Ang katangiang ito sa pagkakaisa ng Iglesia Ni Kristo ay isang lakas na hindi matutularan ng ibat-ibang relihiyon sa Pilipinas, bagama't iyan ang sa ngayo'y pinagsisikapang magawa ng Iglesia Katolika at iba pang mga relihiyon." (This characteristic of unity of the Iglesia ni Kristo is a strength that could not be emulated by the different religions in the Philippines, despite this being the current aim of the Catholic Church and other religions).

== History ==
Iglesia ni Cristo also has two party-lists in the House of Representatives, namely Alagad Party-list founded by Diogenes Osabel in 1997 and its successor SAGIP Partylist in 2013, both chaired by then congressman Rodante Marcoleta who later became elected senator in the 2025 Philippine Senate election. After the elder Marcoleta was elected senator, his son Paolo Marcoleta replaced him as SAGIP partylist congressman.To satisfy the Comelec requirement that marginalized groups are to be represented by partylists, both partylists have been claiming to represent the urban poor and attempt to alleviate poverty in the Philippines.

The Iglesia ni Cristo, under Alagad and SAGIP and under press releases under its own name, has often used its power in Congress to push for matters that it would disagree with the Catholic Church, such as reproduction health. In one privilege speech in 2004, the elder Marcoleta (as Alagad congressman) has pushed for population control while simultaneously attacking the Catholic Church for being too soft on the matter. Similarly in 2011, Iglesia ni Cristo has endorsed the Responsible Parenthood and Reproductive Health Act of 2012, in contrast to the stern opposition of the majority of the Catholic Church.

Alagad partylist was also linked with a practice pro-administration groups for the then president Gloria Macapagal Arroyo in the legislative sector (Alagad joined the majority bloc long after negotiations with Iglesia ni Cristo and Arroyo over the matter of previous president's Estrada's house arrest) used to silence stronger impeachment filings by the opposition by filing weak impeachment complaints (which would block impeachment filings for a year, and would later be attempted again the next year). Then congressman Marcoleta has filed one of these false impeachment complaints in June 2005, clarifying that he was motivated by "betrayal of public trust" during the Hello Garci scandal and was attacked by then Minority Floor Leader Francis Escudero.

Alagad itself was subject to disputes: the previous congressman Osabel would later attempt to oust her successor Marcoleta for "loss of trust and confidence", in which Marcoleta declined to resign. Marcoleta remained the representative of Alagad until it was dissolved in 2013, until he was later reinstated as representative for 1-SAGIP.

The Iglesia ni Cristo is known for sending its members to political rallies in a technique known as "hakot" (Filipino verb meaning "to grab" - in which rally participants are paid to astroturf political rallies), having supported the EDSA III rally calling for the freedom of newly deposed president Joseph Estrada after having been charged for embezzlement. It has sent successive rallies ever since: a rally held in 2015 to protest what was seen by Iglesia ni Cristo as a violation of "separation of church and state" when the Department of Justice under Justice secretary Leila de Lima tried to investigate Iglesia ni Cristo over kidnappings during the 2015 Iglesia ni Cristo leadership controversy, two rallies in 2025 over the proceedings of impeachment of Sara Duterte, one in January 2025 held for one day, one in November 2025 planned for three days (but church management have postponed the rally proceedings on last day), and one in mid-2026 over the plunder charges of the elder Marcoleta (of which he was detained a few days later). All rallies attempted to block highways near National Capital Region, causing serious distruption in traffic.

== Analysis ==
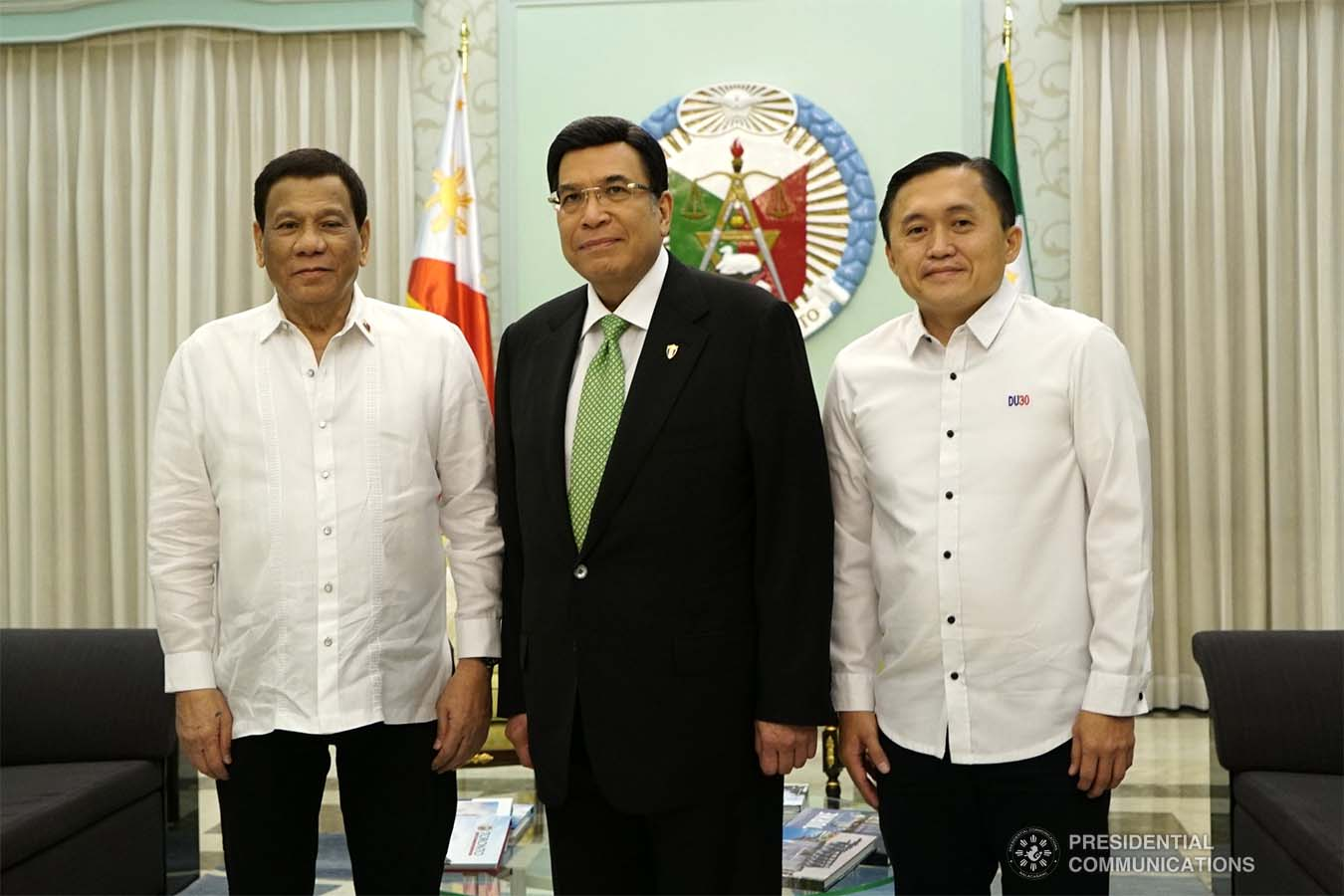
President Rodrigo Duterte receives a warm welcome from INC leader Eduardo Manalo during the President's visit at the INC Central Temple in Commonwealth, Quezon City on Dec 14, 2018

While it is conceded that the effect of the INC's bloc vote might be influential in local elections where the winning margin can only amount to a few hundred votes, the potency of it has yet to be tested convincingly in national races. The INC usually announces its endorsements around a week before election day "when the rankings of the candidates in the polls have stabilized" and candidates' rankings in opinion polls seem to be an important factor on how the INC chooses candidates to support.

Some candidates endorsed by the INC in senatorial elections for instance, have failed to win. During the 2016 Senate elections, INC-backed Martin Romualdez and Francis Tolentino were defeated by Leila de Lima and Kiko Pangilinan. The 2025 Philippine Senate election saw INC-backed Bong Revilla falling in 14th place.

Allen Surla, professor at De La Salle University pointed out that the INC bloc-voting has served the sect well "since they are able to negotiate with politicians' concessions that otherwise would have been denied of less organized groups." For local positions, they can bargain for the employment of their own members, in exchange for perpetual political support. "They may ask the mayor or the governor that a certain percentage of the employment be given to INC members," Surla said. But INC spokesman Edwil Zabala, in a separate interview, strongly denied that the INC bloc-vote has strings attached to it. "We vote, that's it. It is one of the misconceptions that after voting, we do other things. Those who assert that, they should be the ones providing proof for their assertion. We vote, that's all."

Bloc voting is also only practiced inside the Philippines and has never been practiced by members abroad given that election laws existing within their respective countries might bar it. An example in the United States is the Johnson Amendment, a provision in the U.S. tax code since 1954 that prohibits all 501(c)(3) non-profit organizations from endorsing or opposing political candidates. INC has presence in the United States as a 501(c)(3) non-profit organization, and a conduct of bloc voting there similar to their churches in the Philippines will violate the Johnson Amendment that may lead to Internal Revenue Service investigations and a warrant of revocation of tax-exempt status.

== Criticism ==
Edu Manzano, who ran for vice mayor in 1998 (won) and mayor in 2001 (lost) in Makati said that "letting the people decide the election rather than a bloc vote endorsement is better". In both instances INC endorsed his opponents Ernesto Mercado in 1998, and MMDA Chairman Jejomar Binay in 2001. Also, Gwendolyn Garcia in 2007 berated some church officials and accusing them of "endorsement for sale", as Garcia's opponents were endorsed.

== Endorsements (nationally-elected candidates) ==
The following is the list of candidates who have been elected by the Iglesia ni Cristo. The list is limited to candidates running for president, vice president, and senators.

=== President ===
Year	Rank	Candidate	Party	Votes	%	Result	Ref.
1935	1.	Manuel Quezon	Nacionalista	695,332	67.99	Won	
1941	1.	Manuel Quezon	Nacionalista	1,340,320	81.78	Won	
1946	1.	Manuel Roxas	Liberal	1,333,392	53.94	Won	
1949	3.	Jose Avelino	Liberal	419,890	11.85	Lost	
1961	2.	Carlos P. Garcia	Nacionalista	2,902,996	44.95	Lost	
1965	1.	Ferdinand Marcos	Nacionalista	3,861,324	51.94	Won	
1969	1.	Ferdinand Marcos	Nacionalista	5,017,343	61.47	Won	
1981	1.	Ferdinand Marcos	KBL	18,309,360	88.02	Won	
1986	1.	Ferdinand Marcos	KBL	10,807,197 (Note: This vote count comes from the nullified COMELEC tally, in the NAMFREL tally, Marcos achieved just 7,376,599 votes)	53.62 (Note: This percentage comes from the nullified COMELEC tally, in the NAMFREL tally, Marcos achieved just 48.26%)	Disputed (Note: Corazon Aquino became the president after the revolution.)	
1992	3.	Danding Cojuangco	NPC	4,116,376	18.17	Lost	
1998	1.	Joseph Estrada	LAMMP	10,722,295	39.86	Won	
2004	1.	Gloria Macapagal Arroyo	Lakas	12,905,808	39.99	Won	
2010	1.	Benigno Aquino III	Liberal	15,208,678	42.08	Won	
2016	1.	Rodrigo Duterte	PDP–Laban	16,601,997	39.02	Won	
2022	1.	Bongbong Marcos	PFP	31,629,783	58.77	Won	

=== Vice President ===
Year	Rank	Candidate	Party	Votes	%	Result	Ref.
1961	2.	Sergio Osmeña, Jr.	Independent	2,190,424	34.37	Lost	
1969	2.	Genaro Magsaysay	Liberal	2,968,526	37.24	Lost	
1992	1.	Joseph Estrada	NPC	6,739,738	33.01	Won	
1998	1.	Gloria Macapagal Arroyo	Lakas	12,667,252	49.56	Won	
2004	1.	Noli de Castro	Independent	15,100,431	49.80	Won	
2010	2.	Mar Roxas	Liberal	13,918,490	39.58	Lost	
2016	2.	Bongbong Marcos	Independent	14,155,344	34.47	Lost	
2022	1.	Sara Duterte	Lakas	32,208,417	61.53	Won	

=== Senators ===
==== 1995 ====
The following list is incomplete, but endorsed 7 candidates from Lakas–Laban Coalition, and 5 candidates from Nationalist People's Coalition.

Rank	Candidate	Party	Coalition	Votes	%	Result	Ref.
5.	Juan Flavier	Lakas	LABAN	10,748,528	41.76	Won	
6.	Miriam Defensor Santiago	PRP	NPC	9,497,231	36.90	Won	
9.	Gringo Honasan	Independent	NPC	8,968,616	34.853	Won	
15.	Bongbong Marcos	KBL	NPC	8,168,768	31.74	Lost	

==== 2001 ====
Rank	Candidate	Party	Coalition	Votes	%	Result	Ref.
1.	Noli de Castro	Independent	Independent (Note: Guest candidate of Puwersa ng Masa)	16,237,386	55.09	Won	
2	Juan Flavier	Lakas	PPC	11,735,897	39.82	Won	
3.	Serge Osmeña	PDP–Laban	PPC	11,593,389	39.33	Won	
4.	Franklin Drilon	Independent	PPC	11,301,700	38.34	Won	
5.	Joker Arroyo	Lakas	PPC	11,262,402	38.21	Won	
6.	Jun Magsaysay	Liberal	PPC	11,250,677	38.17	Won	
7.	Manny Villar	Independent	PPC	11,187,375	37.96	Won	
8.	Kiko Pangilinan	Liberal	PPC	10,971,896	37.23	Won	
9.	Ed Angara	LDP	PnM	10,805,177	36.66	Won	
10.	Panfilo Lacson	LDP	PnM	10,535,559	35.74	Won	
11.	Loi Ejercito	Independent	PnM	10,524,130	35.71	Won	
12.	Ralph Recto	Lakas	PPC	10,480,940	35.56	Won	
15.	Miriam Defensor Santiago	PRP	PnM	9,622,742	32.65	Lost	

==== 2004 ====
Rank	Candidate	Party	Coalition	Votes	%	Result	Ref.
1.	Mar Roxas	Liberal	K4	19,372,888	54.56	Won	
2	Bong Revilla	Lakas	K4	15,801,531	44.50	Won	
3.	Nene Pimentel	PDP–Laban	KNP	13,519,998	38.07	Won	
4.	Jamby Madrigal	LDP	KNP	13,253,692	37.32	Won	
7.	Miriam Defensor Santiago	PRP	K4	12,187,401	34.32	Won	
8.	Alfredo Lim	PMP	KNP	11,286,428	31.78	Won	
9.	Juan Ponce Enrile	PMP	KNP	11,191,162	31.52	Won	
10.	Jinggoy Estrada	PMP	KNP	11,094,120	31.24	Won	
12.	Rodolfo Biazon	Liberal	K4	10,635,270	29.95	Won	
13.	Robert Barbers	Lakas	K4	10,624,585	29.92	Lost	
14.	Ernesto Maceda	NPC	KNP	9,944,328	28.00	Lost	
15.	John Henry Osmeña	NPC	K4	9,914,179	27.92	Lost	

==== 2007 ====
Rank	Candidate	Party	Coalition	Votes	%	Result	Ref.
1	Loren Legarda	NPC	GO	18,501,734	62.72	Won	
2	Chiz Escudero	NPC	GO	18,265,307	61.92	Won	
3	Ping Lacson	UNO	GO	15,509,188	52.58	Won	
4	Manny Villar	Nacionalista	GO	15,338,412	52.00	Won	
5	Kiko Pangilinan	Liberal	Independent	14,534,678	49.27	Won	
6	Noynoy Aquino	Liberal	GO	14,309,349	48.51	Won	
7	Ed Angara	LDP	TEAM Unity	12,657,769	42.91	Won	
8	Joker Arroyo	KAMPI	TEAM Unity	11,803,107	40.01	Won	
12	Migz Zubiri (Note: Migz Zubiri was later removed from office in favor of Koko Pimentel who won an election protest.)	Lakas	TEAM Unity	11,005,866	37.31	Won	
14	Ralph Recto	Lakas	TEAM Unity	10,721,252	36.34	Lost	
14	Mike Defensor	Lakas	TEAM Unity	9,938,995	33.69	Lost	
19	Tito Sotto	NPC	TEAM Unity	7,638,361	25.89	Lost	

==== 2010 ====
Rank	Candidate	Party	Votes	%	Result	Ref.
1.	Bong Revilla	Lakas	19,513,521	51.15	Won	
2.	Jinggoy Estrada	PMP	18,925,925	49.61	Won	
3.	Miriam Defensor Santiago	PRP	17,344,742	45.47	Won	
4.	Franklin Drilon	Liberal	15,871,117	41.60	Won	
5.	Juan Ponce Enrile	PMP	15,665,618	41.06	Won	
6.	Pia Cayetano	Nacionalista	13,679,511	35.86	Won	
7.	Bongbong Marcos	Nacionalista	13,169,634	34.52	Won	
8.	Ralph Recto	Liberal	12,436,960	32.60	Won	
9.	Tito Sotto	NPC	11,891,711	31.17	Won	
11.	Lito Lapid	Lakas	11,025,805	28.90	Won	
12.	TG Guingona	Liberal	10,277,352	26.94	Won	
16.	Ruffy Biazon	Liberal	8,626,514	22.61	Lost	

==== 2013 ====
Rank	Candidate	Party	Coalition	Votes	%	Result	Ref.
1	Grace Poe	Independent	Team PNoy	20,337,327	50.66	Won	
2	Loren Legarda	NPC	Team PNoy	18,661,196	46.49	Won	
3	Alan Peter Cayetano	Nacionalista	Team PNoy	17,580,813	43.79	Won	
5	Nancy Binay	UNA	UNA	16,812,148	41.88	Won	
6	Sonny Angara	LDP	Team PNoy	16,005,564	39.87	Won	
7	Bam Aquino	Liberal	Team PNoy	15,534,465	38.70	Won	
9	Sonny Trillanes	Nacionalista	Team PNoy	14,127,722	35.19	Won	
10	Cynthia Villar	Nacionalista	Team PNoy	13,822,854	34.43	Won	
11	JV Ejercito	PMP	UNA	13,684,736	34.09	Won	
12	Gringo Honasan	Independent	UNA	13,211,424	32.91	Won	
13	Dick Gordon	Bagumbayan	UNA	12,501,991	31.14	Lost	
15	Jack Enrile	NPC	UNA	11,543,024	28.75	Lost	

==== 2016 ====
Rank	Candidate	Party	Coalition	Votes	%	Result	Ref.
1	Franklin Drilon	Liberal	KDM	18,607,391	41.37	Won	
2	Joel Villanueva	Liberal	KDM	18,459,222	41.04	Won	
3	Tito Sotto	NPC	PGP	17,200,371	38.24	Won	
4	Panfilo Lacson	Independent	KDM	16,926,152	37.63	Won	
5	Richard "Dick" Gordon	Independent	PGP	16,719,322	37.17	Won	
6	Migz Zubiri	Independent	PGP	16,119,165	35.84	Won	
7	Manny Pacquiao	UNA	UNA	16,050,546	35.68	Won	
9	Risa Hontiveros	Akbayan	KDM	15,915,213	35.38	Won	
10	Sherwin Gatchalian	NPC	PGP	14,953,768	33.25	Won	
11	Ralph Recto	Liberal	KDM	14,271,868	31.73	Won	
13	Francis Tolentino	Independent	PRP	12,811,098	28.48	Lost	
15	Martin Romualdez	Lakas	PRP	12,325,824	27.40	Lost	

==== 2019 ====
Rank	Candidate	Party	Coalition	Votes	%	Result	Ref.
1.	Cynthia Villar	Nacionalista	Hugpong	25,283,727	53.46	Won	
2	Grace Poe	Independent	Independent	22,029,788	46.58	Won	
3.	Bong Go	PDP–Laban	Hugpong	20,657,702	43.68	Won	
4.	Pia Cayetano	Nacionalista	Hugpong	19,789,019	41.84	Won	
5.	Ronald dela Rosa	PDP–Laban	Hugpong	19,004,225	40.18	Won	
6.	Sonny Angara	LDP	Hugpong	18,161,862	38.40	Won	
7.	Lito Lapid	NPC	NPC	16,965,464	35.87	Won	
8.	Imee Marcos	Nacionalista	Hugpong	15,882,628	33.58	Won	
9.	Francis Tolentino	PDP–Laban	Hugpong	15,510,026	32.79	Won	
11.	Bong Revilla	Lakas	Hugpong	14,624,445	30.92	Won	
12.	Nancy Binay	UNA	UNA	14,504,936	30.67	Won	
15.	Jinggoy Estrada	PMP	Hugpong	11,359,305	24.02	Lost	

==== 2022 ====
Rank	Candidate	Party	Votes	%	Result	Ref.
1.	Robin Padilla	PDP–Laban	27,027,235	48.23	Won	
2.	Loren Legarda	NPC	24,367,564	43.48	Won	
4.	Win Gatchalian	NPC	20,678,804	36.89	Won	
5.	Francis Escudero	NPC	20,320,069	36.26	Won	
6.	Mark Villar	Nacionalista	19,563,262	34.91	Won	
7.	Alan Peter Cayetano	Independent	19,359,758	34.54	Won	
8.	Migz Zubiri	Independent	18,931,207	33.78	Won	
9.	Joel Villanueva	Independent	18,539,537	33.08	Won	
11.	JV Ejercito	NPC	15,901,891	28.37	Won	
12.	Jinggoy Estrada	PMP	15,174,288	27.08	Won	
13.	Jejomar Binay	UNA	13,348,887	23.82	Lost	
16.	Guillermo Eleazar	Reporma	11,360,526	20.27	Lost	

==== 2025 ====
Only 8 candidates were endorsed by the sect:

Rank	Candidate	Party	Coalition	Votes	%	Result	Ref.
1	Bong Go	PDP	DuterTen	27,121,073	6.33	Won	
2	Bam Aquino	KANP	KiBam	20,971,899	4.89	Won	
3	Ronald dela Rosa	PDP	DuterTen	20,773,946	4.85	Won	
6	Rodante Marcoleta	Independent	DuterTen	15,250,723	3.56	Won	
9	Pia Cayetano	Nacionalista	Alyansa	14,573,430	3.40	Won	
10	Camille Villar	Nacionalista	Alyansa (Note: Guest candidates of DuterTen)	13,651,274	3.19	Won	
12	Imee Marcos	Nacionalista	Independent (Note: Originally ran with Alyansa prior to her withdrawal on March 26)	13,339,227	3.11	Won	
14	Bong Revilla	Lakas	Alyansa	12,027,845	2.81	Lost	

== Endorsements on local executives ==
The following are those endorsed in local elections by the sect:

=== Bataan ===
Year	Rank	Candidate	Party	Votes	%	Result	Ref.
1992	1.	Ding Roman	NPC			Won	

=== Laguna ===
Year	Rank	Candidate	Party	Votes	%	Result	Ref.
1992	2.	Nereo Joaquin	NPC	167,768	32.06	Lost	
2016	1.	Ramil Hernandez	Nacionalista	607,347	51.12	Won	
2022	1.	Ramil Hernandez	PDP–Laban	872,378	57.60	Won	
2025	2.	Ruth Hernandez	Lakas	548,286	34.33	Lost	

=== Manila ===
==== Mayor ====
Year	Rank	Candidate	Party	Votes	%	Result	Ref.
2010	2.	Lito Atienza	PMP	181,094	27.22	Lost	
2013	1.	Joseph Estrada	UNA	343,993	52.72	Won	
2016	1.	Joseph Estrada	PMP	283,149	38.54	Won	
2019	1.	Isko Moreno	Asenso	357,925	50.15	Won	
2022	1.	Honey Lacuna	Asenso	538,595	63.68	Won	
2025	1.	Isko Moreno	Aksyon	530,825	59.02	Won	

==== Vice Mayor ====
Year	Rank	Candidate	Party	Votes	%	Result	Ref.
2019	1.	Honey Lacuna	Asenso	394,766	57.28	Won	
2022	1.	Yul Servo	Asenso	586,855	73.67	Won	
2025	1.	Chi Atienza	Aksyon	584,145	66.65	Won	

=== Makati ===
==== Mayor ====
Year	Rank	Candidate	Party	Votes	%	Result	Ref.
2001	1.	Jejomar Binay	PDP–Laban	137,030	65.49	Won	
2025	2.	Luis Campos	NPC	85,664	41.97	Lost	

==== Vice Mayor ====
Year	Rank	Candidate	Party	Votes	%	Result	Ref.
1998	2.	Ernesto S. Mercado	PDP–Laban	100,894	38.95	Lost	
2001	1.	Ernesto S. Mercado	PDP–Laban	115,696	56.97	Won	
2025	1.	Kid Peña	NPC	146,771	73.00	Won	

=== Malabon ===
==== Mayor ====
Year	Rank	Candidate	Party	Votes	%	Result	Ref.
2025	1.	Jeannie Sandoval	Nacionalista	120,757	51.63	Won	

=== Quezon City ===
==== Mayor ====
Year	Rank	Candidate	Party	Votes	%	Result	Ref.
2010	1.	Herbert Bautista	Liberal	500,563	67.79	Won	
2019	1.	Joy Belmonte	SBP	469,480	54.09	Won	
2022	1.	Joy Belmonte	SBP	662,611	60.43	Won	

==== Vice Mayor ====
Year	Rank	Candidate	Party	Votes	%	Result	Ref.
2010	1.	Joy Belmonte	Liberal	503,657	69.98	Won	
2022	1.	Gian Sotto	SBP	594,170	56.51	Won	

=== San Juan, Metro Manila ===
==== Mayor ====
Year	Rank	Candidate	Party	Votes	%	Result	Ref.
2016	1.	Guia Gomez	PMP	28,828	51.08	Won	

== Endorsements on House of Representatives elections ==
=== Rizal ===
==== 1st district ====
Year	Rank	Candidate	Party	Votes	%	Result	Ref.
1994 special	1.	Gilberto Duavit Sr.	NPC	59,987	46.46	Won	
