= Butz Aquino =

Filipino politician (1939–2015)

The Honorable Agapito A. Aquino
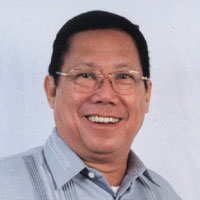
- Official portrait, 2004

Deputy Speaker of the House of Representatives of the Philippines
- In office November 13, 2000 – June 30, 2001
- Preceded by: Alfredo Abueg
- Succeeded by: Emilio Espinosa Jr.

Member of the Philippine House of Representatives from Makati's 2nd district
- In office June 30, 1998 – June 30, 2007
- Preceded by: District established
- Succeeded by: Abigail Binay

Senator of the Philippines
- In office June 30, 1987 – June 30, 1995

Personal details
- Born: May 20, 1939 Manila or Concepcion, Tarlac, Commonwealth of the Philippines
- Died: August 17, 2015 (aged 76) San Juan, Philippines
- Resting place: St. Therese Columbarium
- Party: Independent (2009–2015)
- Other political affiliations: LDP (1988–2009); LAMMP (1998); BANDILA (before 1988)
- Spouse: Popsy Mendez
- Relations: Aquino family
- Children: 5, including Jackie
- Parents: Benigno Aquino Sr. (father); Aurora Aquino (mother)

Agapito "Butz" Aquino (May 20, 1939 – August 17, 2015) was a Filipino politician, human rights activist and actor who spoke on the Radio Veritas broadcast with Cardinal Jaime Sin that initiated the People Power Revolution on February 22, 1986.

He served as Senator of the Philippines from 1987 to 1995, congressman from Makati and a part-time film and television actor. He was born to former senator Benigno S. Aquino Sr. and Aurora Aquino. He was the brother of former senators Benigno S. Aquino Jr. and Tessie Aquino-Oreta, as well as the uncle of President Benigno S. Aquino III and Senator Paolo Benigno "Bam" Aquino IV. In 2024, Butz Aquino was honored by having his name inscribed at the wall of remembrance of the Philippines' Bantayog ng mga Bayani memorial, which honors the martyrs and heroes who fought against the Martial Law regime of Philippine dictator Ferdinand Marcos.

== Early life ==
Aquino was born at May 20, 1939 in Manila or, according to his birth certificate, in Concepcion, Tarlac, where he would be raised. His parents were Benigno Aquino Sr., who was the Secretary of Agriculture and Commerce at the time of his birth, and Aurora A. Aquino. His siblings were: Benigno S. "Ninoy" Aquino Jr., Paul Aquino, Maria Teresa Aquino-Oreta, Maria Gerarda "Ditas" Aquino-Valdes, Maria Guadalupe "Lupita" Aquino-Kashiwahara, and Maria Aurora "Maur" Aquino-Lichauco.

== Early career ==
Aquino started out as an entrepreneur and was the President of Mofire Fiberglass Inc. from the 1970s until the 1980s. In that period, he wasn't interested in politics. He was said to be cynical about politics and believed that it was a "ballgame of the rich". According to journalist Gregg Jones, Aquino served as his imprisoned brother Ninoy's representative in 1978 during indirect negotiations with the Manila chapter of the Communist Party of the Philippines (CPP), which sought to add candidates it approved of to the Metro Manila opposition slate in the 1978 Interim Batasang Pambansa elections. He started participating in politics when his brother Ninoy, was assassinated on August 21, 1983, at Manila International Airport.

== Activism and organizational leadership ==
=== August Twenty-One Movement (ATOM) ===
Under the administration of President Ferdinand Marcos, Agapito was one of the founders of the August Twenty-One Movement (ATOM), Coalition of Organizations for the Restoration of Democracy (CORD) and Bansang Nagkakaisa sa Diwa at Layunin (BANDILA). Jejomar Binay was also one of the founders of ATOM as a legal counselor. Agapito became close friends with Binay as co-founders.

=== KOMPIL ===
In January 1984, Aquino established with the aid of the CPP the Kongreso ng Mamamayang Pilipino (KOMPIL), which aimed to unite the opposition against the Marcos administration. The CPP's condition in aiding its formation was for them to decide whether or not the group will boycott the 1984 Batasang Pambansa election in May. After the CPP decided on a boycott, Aquino through KOMPIL called for the same, which noticeably contrasted with his family's position of participating in the election.

=== Lakbayan march ===
In early March 1984, Aquino organized a week-long protest march called Lakad ng Bayan para sa Kalayaan (lit. 'country's walk for freedom'; shortened to "Lakbayan") to defy the Marcos regime. The march had two points of origin: Concepcion, Tarlac and San Pablo, Laguna, and ended at Luneta Park in Manila. Footage of the march was later compiled into the short documentary film Daluyong (lit. 'tidal wave').

=== Bayan ===
In May 1985, upon the establishment of the Bagong Alyansang Makabayan (or Bayan), Aquino was elected to its National Council. After two weeks, however, Aquino resigned from the council with Teofisto Guingona Jr., with the two being reportedly uneasy about the growing influence of the CPP and its National Democratic Front (NDF) in the alliance. Aquino thus formed a new organization with Guingona called Bansang Nagkaisa sa Diwa at Layunin (BANDILA; lit. 'country united in spirit and objective'), and by August 4, 1985 he launched another group called the Filipino Social Democratic Movement (FSDM) at a convention within the Ateneo de Manila University, with Mar Canonigo as secretary general. In a conversation with journalist Gregg Jones that same month, Aquino claimed that the CPP had been attempting to impose itself on how the composition of Bayan's national council should be during its first congress, and that while he had permitted the CPP to utilize him in the past, he vowed to no longer associate with the party: "Diokno, Tañada and I worked with them in trust. For us, that trust was broken at the Bayan national congress."

=== People Power Revolution ===
On February 22, 1986, Aquino was attending the birthday party of ATOM member Mildred Juan when rumors of Juan Ponce Enrile and Fidel V. Ramos defecting from the Marcos administration was relayed, upon which he and nine other ATOM members went to his Mofire office landline to confirm the news with Quezon City assemblywoman Cecilia Muñoz-Palma. Aquino thus went directly to Camp Aguinaldo for Enrile and Ramos' second press conference and proceeded to offer his support, with Enrile answering: "We need all the support we can get." After the conference, Aquino asked Radio Veritas journalist Jun Taña, then reporting on the event through telephone, if he could speak on the air.

Through Radio Veritas, he called for a gathering of the public, including his "friends in ATOM, BANDILA and FSDM", at the Isetann department store in Quezon City to begin a march to Camp Aguinaldo; some minutes later, Cardinal Jaime Sin gave a call-to-action for Filipinos to gather at the camp to help defend Enrile and Ramos from potential retaliation by the Marcos regime. Although Aquino and former diplomat Tomas Achacoso arrived at Isetann at 10:45 p.m. with only four other people, the attendees soon grew in number, and Aquino issued a second call by 11:30 p.m. through Radio Veritas despite orders by Armed Forces Chief Fabian Ver to halt the station's broadcast. Some hours after Aquino and Sin broadcast their messages, several soldiers attacked and destroyed the station's transmitter.

On February 25, 1986, three days after Aquino and Sin's broadcast, the movement spread nationwide and became known as the People Power Revolution (also called the EDSA Revolution), managing to remove the Marcos family from government and install Corazon Aquino as the new president of the Philippines.

== Political career ==
=== Senate and the House of Representatives (1987–2007) ===
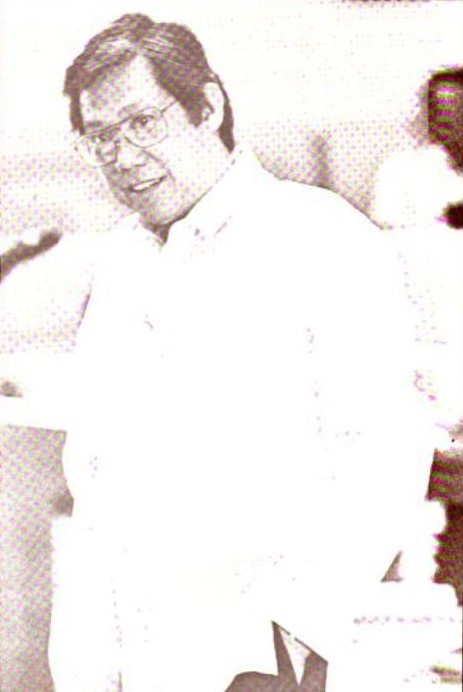
Aquino as a senator, photograph released by the Philippine Congress, c. 1988

In 1987, he was elected to be a Senator of the Philippines and continued to be part of Senate when he was re-elected in 1992. Placing 24th and last among all winning senators in the 1992 elections, he became term-limited in 1995. In 1995, he ran for representative of the newly created 2nd District of Makati and won. However, the Commission on Elections (COMELEC) en banc later declared him ineligible for failing to meet the one-year residency requirement, while the district was created four months before the election. Thus, the seat remained vacant for the entire 10th Congress.

Aquino was later duly elected as the first representative of the 2nd District of Makati in 1998. He also was the Deputy Speaker for Luzon from November 2000 to January 2001 and the Minority Floor Leader from January 2001 to June 2001. He was re-elected in 2001 and 2004 and completed his final term in 2007.

He was known for being an advocate of small farmers and of cooperative principles as he legislated the notable Magna Carta for Small Farmers, Seed Act, and the Cooperative Code of the Philippines.

=== 2010 Makati mayoral run ===
In 2010, Aquino said in an interview with The Philippine Star that he had plans in returning to the Senate but after learning that his nephew, Benigno "Noynoy" Aquino III, was the Liberal Party's candidate for president, he backed out and supported his nephew. He instead ran for Mayor of Makati as an independent candidate, but lost to 1st district councilor Jejomar "Jun-jun" Binay Jr., son of outgoing mayor Jejomar Binay. After which, Aquino never again pursued any political positions.

== Death ==
Aquino died on August 17, 2015, while confined at the Cardinal Santos Medical Center in San Juan, Metro Manila, citing "natural causes", according to his nephew, Senator Bam Aquino. He was 76. His remains were cremated, brought to the Senate for a tribute on August 19, and laid to rest at St. Therese Columbarium in Pasay.

== Electoral history ==
Electoral history of Butz Aquino
Year	Office	Party	Votes received				Result
Year	Office	Party	Total	%	P.	Swing	Result
1987	Senator	Lakas ng Bayan	12,426,432	54.65	2nd	—N/a	Won
1992	Senator	LDP	3,964,966	16.35	24th	–38.3	Won
1995	Representative (Makati–2nd)	LDP	38,547	—N/a	1st	—N/a	Won (disqualified)
1998	Representative (Makati–2nd)	LAMMP	76,807	65.85	1st	—N/a	Won
2001	Representative (Makati–2nd)	LDP	56,737	63.37	1st	–2.48	Won
2004	Representative (Makati–2nd)	LDP	86,937	79.44	1st	+16.07	Won
2010	Mayor of Makati	Independent	5,816	2.13	4th	—N/a	Lost

== Filmography ==
=== Film ===
- The Passionate Strangers (1966) - Julio Lazatin
- Impossible Dream (1973) - Atty. Barredo
- Hello... Goodnight... Goodbye (segment "Hello"; 1975)
- Mother and Daughter (1975)
- Postcards from China (1975)
- Magandang Gabi sa Inyong Lahat (1976)
- Mapang-akit... ang Dilim ng Gabi (1976)
- Mahal Kong Taksil (1979)
- Aliw (1979)
- Sugat sa Ugat (1980)
- The Last Reunion (1982; shot in 1978) - Japanese General
- To Love Again (1983)
- Pacific Inferno (1985; shot in 1979) - Dubayashi
- Kailangan Ko'y Ikaw (2000) - Francine's father
- Kung Ako Na Lang Sana (2003) - Ed Valladolid

=== Television ===
- Savage: In the Orient (1983) – Captain Saprido
- Palos (2008) - President Donatello Guidotti
- I Heart You, Pare! (2011) - Mr. Henry Castillo

House of Representatives of the Philippines
New district	Member of the House of Representatives from Makati's 2nd district 1998–2007	Succeeded by Abby Binay
