= 2010 Makati local elections =

6th City elections in Makati

2010 Makati mayoral elections
- May 10, 2010
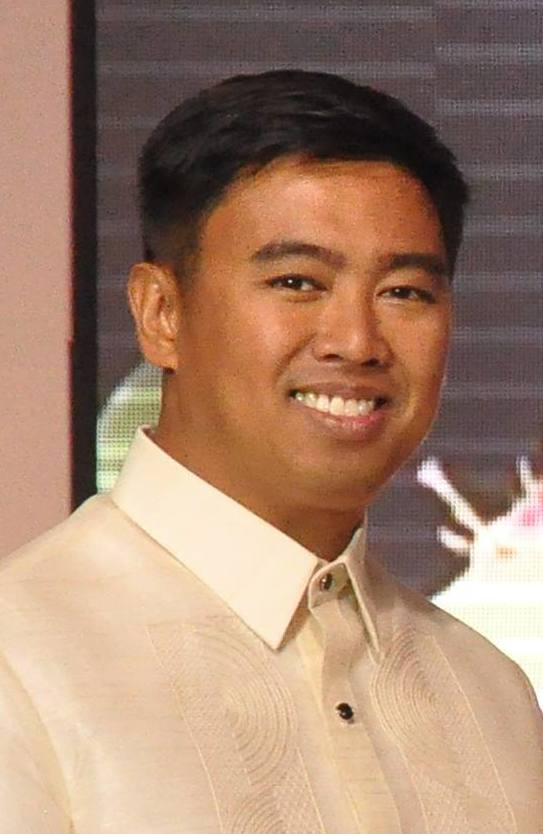

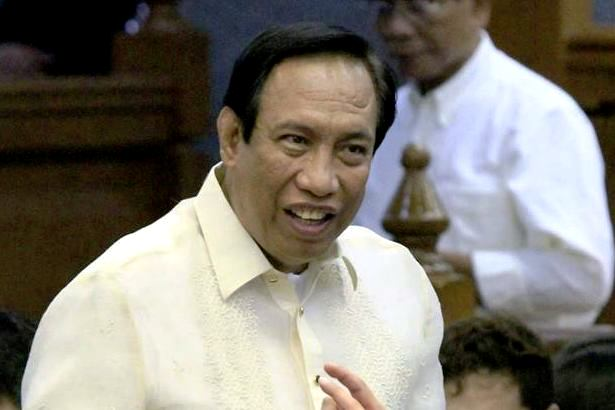

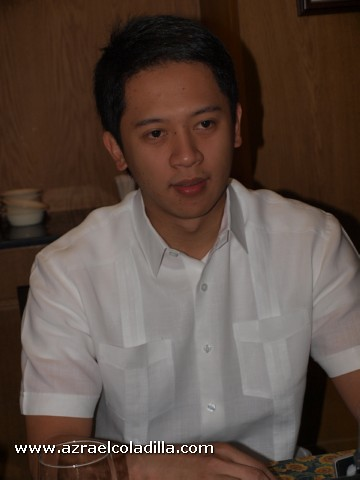

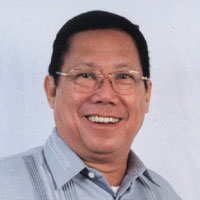
Nominee	Junjun Binay	Ernesto Mercado	Erwin Genuino
Party	PDP–Laban	Nacionalista	Bigkis
Alliance	Team Binay	United Action Team	Bagong Makati, Bagong Mukha
Running mate	Rico J. Puno	Romulo Peña Jr.	Jobelle Salvador
Popular vote	125,664	80,151	61,203
Percentage	46.02	29.35	22.41
Nominee	Butz Aquino	Eddie Tagalog
Party	Independent	Independent
Alliance	Team Butz-Mace
Running mate	Miguel "Mace" Yabut Jr.
Popular vote	5,816	253
Percentage	2.13	0.09
Mayor before election
Jejomar Binay
PDP–Laban
Elected mayor
Junjun Binay
PDP–Laban
- Vice mayoral election
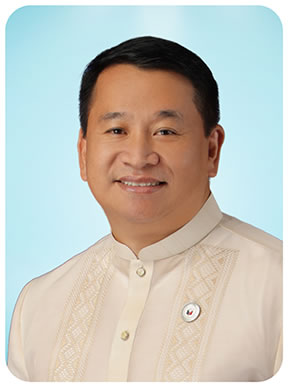

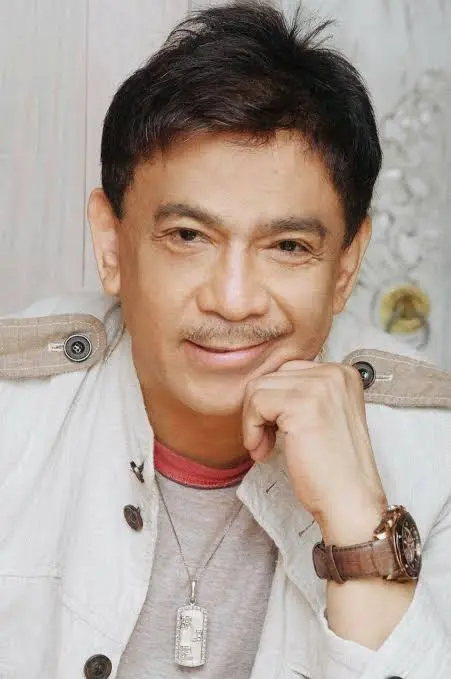

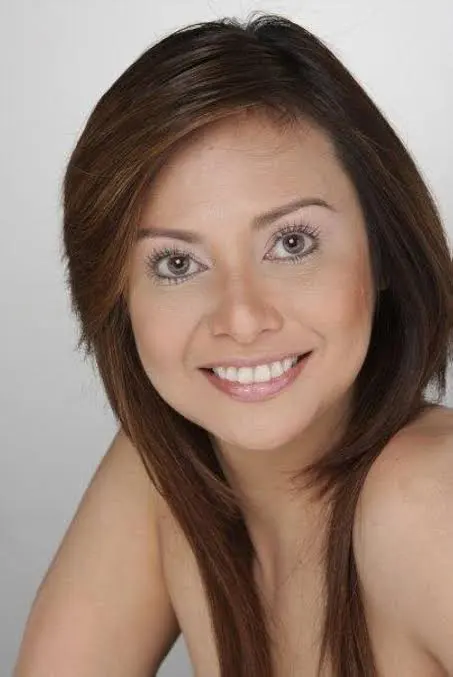
Candidate	Romulo Peña Jr.	Rico J. Puno	Jobelle Salvador
Party	Independent	PDP–Laban	Bigkis
Alliance	United Action Team	Team Binay	Bagong Makati, Bagong Mukha
Popular vote	105,949	93,429	35,469
Percentage	40.76%	35.94%	13.64%
Candidate	Miguel "Mace" Yabut Jr.	Manuel "Manny" Ballelos Jr.
Party	Independent	Independent
Alliance	Team Butz-Mace
Popular vote	23,600	1,507
Percentage	9.08%	0.58%
Vice Mayor before election
Ernesto Mercado
Nacionalista
Elected Vice Mayor
Romulo Peña Jr.
Independent

Local elections were held in Makati on May 10, 2010, within the 2010 Philippine general election. The voters will elect for the elective local posts in the city: the mayor, vice mayor, two district representatives, and councilors, eight in each of the city's two legislative districts.

== Mayoral and vice mayoral election ==
Incumbents Jejomar Binay and Ernesto Mercado were on their third consecutive term as mayor and vice mayor of Makati, respectively. Mercado announced that he is running for the mayorship of the city, while Binay decided to run for vice president as the running mate of former President Joseph Estrada of the Pwersa ng Masang Pilipino party. Binay and Mercado had confirmed their parting in December 2009 when the latter moved to the Nacionalista Party. His running mate was ABC President and Barangay Valenzuela Chairman Romulo Peña Jr., who is running as an independent.

Binay's only son, Jejomar Erwin, Jr., ran for mayor as a candidate of PDP–Laban. He served as the city councilor from the 1st District since 1992. His running mate was singer and former 1st District city councilor Rico J. Puno. Puno served as councilor from the 1st District from 1998 to 2007.

Former Senator and 2nd district representative Agapito Aquino ran as an independent candidate. He and mayoralty candidates Binay and Mercado were erstwhile allies. He became senator from 1987 to 1995 and congressman for three consecutive terms from 1998 to 2007. His running mate was Miguel Yabut, Jr., the eldest grandson of late Mayor Nemesio Yabut.

Atty. Erwin Genuino also ran for mayor as a candidate of Bigkis Pinoy Movement. His running mate was actress Jobelle Salvador.

Other candidate running for mayor was police officer Eddie Tagalog, an independent candidate. His life was portrayed in the 1992 film Pulis Makati.

== Congressional elections ==
There will be two candidates for the congressman or district representative post of each of the districts of Makati. The city is divided into two congressional districts: the first district and the second district.

The incumbent first district representative Teodoro Locsin Jr. was on his third consecutive term and was ineligible to seek reelection. His party, which is PDP–Laban, nominated outgoing councilor Monique Lagdameo. Locsin's wife, Maria Lourdes, was nominated by the Liberal Party. They faced former councilors Oscar Ibay and Robert Dean Barbers, as well as KBL candidate Oswaldo Carbonell.

For the second district, the incumbent representative Abigail Binay ran under PDP–Laban party. She was elected in 2007, succeeding Butz Aquino. She opposed outgoing councilor and former city engineer Ernesto "Aspi" Aspillaga and Bigkis Pinoy nominee John Christian Montes.

== Opinion polls ==
Commissioned by Victor Limlingan, Jr., Social Weather Stations conducted one survey in the city from April 7 to 9, 2010, with a sample size of 600, divided equally on Makati's two districts (300 each), with a sampling error of ±4% for the entire city and ±6% for both districts.

Candidate	Aquino	Binay	Genuino	Mercado	Tagalog	Undecided/others
Makati	1%	16%	18%	24%	0.3%	11%
Makati's 1st district	1%	11%	18%	21%	0.3%	9%
Makati's 2nd district	1%	11%	19%	26%	0%	13%
Class ABC (upper and middle class)	0%	11%	10%	19%	0%	20%
Class D (lower class)	1%	14%	19%	26%	0.2%	10%
Class E (lower class)	2%	18%	17%	20%	0.7%	12%

== Candidates ==
=== Team Binay ===
PDP–Laban/Team Binay
Name	Party
For Mayor
Jejomar Erwin "Junjun" S. Binay Jr.	PDP–Laban
For Vice Mayor
Enrico "Rico J." Puno	PDP–Laban
For House Of Representative (1st District)
Monique "Nik" Lagdameo	PDP–Laban
For Councilor (1st District)
Marie Alethea "Mayeth" S. Casal-Uy	PDP–Laban
Ferdinand Jacinto "Ferdie Tangol" T. Eusebio	PDP–Laban
Luis "Jojo" S. Javier, Jr.	Independent
Arnold "Idol" C. Magpantay	Independent
Romeo "Romy" C. Medina	Independent
Ma. Arlene M. Ortega	Independent
Armando "Idol" P. Padilla	PDP–Laban
Tosca Camille T. Puno-Ramos	PDP–Laban
For House Of Representative (2nd District)
Mar-Len Abigail "Abby" S. Binay-Campos	PDP–Laban
For Councilor (2nd District)
Rodolfo "Rod" D. Biolena	Independent
Angelito "Angie" D. Gatchalian	PDP–Laban
Joel A. Ibay	PDP–Laban
Jeline "Baby" M. Olfato	PDP–Laban
Nelson "Doc" S. Pasia	PDP–Laban
Richard Reymund "Richie" R. Rodriguez	Independent
Wenefreda "Wennie" M. Ureña	Independent
Evelyn Delfina "Bing" E. Villamor	PDP–Laban

=== United Action Team ===
Nacionalista PartyLiberal Party/Nationalist People's Coalition/United Action Team
Name	Party
For Mayor
Ernesto "Nestor" S. Mercado	Nacionalista
For Vice Mayor
Romulo "Kid" Peña Jr.	Independent
For House Of Representative (1st District)
Ma. Lourdes B. Locsin	Liberal
For Councilor (1st District)
Renato "Rene" L. Bondal	Nacionalista
Manuel Monsour T. del Rosario III	Nacionalista
Glenn C. Enciso	Nacionalista
Ferdinand V. Estrella	Independent
Virgilio "VirJhong" V. Hilario, Sr.	Nacionalista
Eduardo "Eddie" M. Ison	Nacionalista
Severino "Verong" L. Umandap	Nacionalista
Ma. Concepcion "Ichi" M. Yabut	Nacionalista
For House Of Representative (2nd District)
Ernesto "Aspi" A. Aspillaga	Nacionalista
For Councilor (2nd District)
Ma. Theresa "Tetchie" Nillo-de Lara	Nacionalista
Juanito "Johnny" L. dela Cruz	Independent
Henry A. Jacome	Nacionalista
Leonardo "Leo" M. Magpantay	Nacionalista
Salvador "Buddy" D. Pangilinan	Nacionalista
Vincent T. Sese	Nacionalista
Mary Ruth C. Tolentino	Nacionalista
Nemesio "King" S. Yabut Jr.	NPC

=== Bagong Makati, Bagong Mukha ===
Bigkis Pinoy Movement/Bagong Makati, Bagong Mukha
Name	Party
For Mayor
Erwin "Win" F. Genuino	Bigkis
For Vice Mayor
Maria Jobelle Louise J. Salvador	Bigkis
For House Of Representative (1st District)
Oscar M. Ibay	Bigkis
For Councilor (1st District)
Virgilio "Battle" R. Batalla	Bigkis
Pedro P. Dadula	Bigkis
Rodelio L. Dela Cruz	Bigkis
Peter John C. Gonzalez	Bigkis
Michael Dennis V. Reyes	Bigkis
Wilfredo "Willy" M. Talag	Bigkis
Jessielin "Jessy" O. Trinidad	Bigkis
Arnold J. Valenzuela	Bigkis
For House Of Representative (2nd District)
John Christian M. Montes	Bigkis
For Councilor (2nd District)
Catalina A. Balaoing	Bigkis
Benedict "Bodik" B. Baniqued	Bigkis
Virgilio G. Calimbahin, Jr.	Bigkis
Abner D. Dreu	Bigkis
Elena B. Maccay	Bigkis
Gaspar "Pastor" E. Mapagdalita	Bigkis
Ceferino "Jun" V. Peralta, Jr.	Bigkis
Armando "Arman" I. Tercero	Bigkis

=== Team Butz-Mace ===
Team Butz-Mace
Name	Party
For Mayor
Agapito "Butz" A. Aquino	Independent
For Vice Mayor
Miguel "Mace" B. Yabut Jr.	Independent

=== Independent Candidates ===
Independent
Name	Party
For Mayor
Edmundo "Eddie" H. Tagalog	Independent
For Vice Mayor
Manuel "Manny" E. Ballelos Jr.	Independent
For House of Representative (1st District)
Robert Dean Barbers	Independent
For Councilor (1st District)
Felicisimo P. Bascon Jr.	Independent
Remigio M. Jerusalem Jr.	Independent
Otelio K. Jochico	Independent
Racquel A. Manalili	Independent
Edwin Lester S. Quiboloy	Independent
Perfecto "Bambi" M. Santos	Independent
For Councilor (2nd District)
Alberto P. Almario	Independent
Nemesio "Manong" B. Beare	Independent
Carlito F. Buenaventura	Independent
Alfredo N. Lapasaran	Independent
Antonio "Tony" G. Manalili	Independent
Nilo Z. Miranda	Independent

=== Other Non-Independent Candidates ===
Kilusang Bagong Lipunan
For House of Representative (1st District)
Oswaldo Carbonell	KBL

Philippine Green Republican Party
For Councilor (1st District)
Erlinda M. Lima	PGRP

== Results ==
The candidates for mayor and vice mayor with the highest number of votes wins the seat; they are voted separately, therefore, they may be of different parties when elected.

=== Mayoral election results ===
Genuino placed the result of the election under protest in the Mayoral Electoral Tribunal.

Makati mayoral election
Party	Candidate	Votes	%
PDP–Laban	Junjun Binay	125,664	46.02
Nacionalista	Ernesto "Nestor" Mercado	80,151	29.35
Bigkis	Erwin "Win" Genuino	61,203	22.41
Independent	Butz Aquino	5,816	2.13
Independent	Edmundo "Eddie" Tagalog	253	0.09
Valid ballots		273,087	96.67
Invalid or blank votes		9,402	3.33
Total votes		282,489	100.00
PDP–Laban hold			

=== Vice Mayoral election results ===
Makati vice mayoral election
Party	Candidate	Votes	%
Independent	Kid Peña^{[A]}	105,949	40.76
PDP–Laban	Rico J. Puno	93,429	35.94
Bigkis	Jobelle Salvador	35,469	13.64
Independent	Miguel "Mace" Yabut Jr.	23,600	9.08
Independent	Manuel "Manny" Ballelos Jr.	1,507	0.58
Valid ballots		259,954	92.02
Invalid or blank votes		22,535	7.98
Total votes		282,489	100.00
Independent gain from Nacionalista			

Notes

- A Peña is Mercado's (Nacionalista) guest candidate.
- The Team Binay wing is under Partido ng Masang Pilipino (PMP), with Jejomar Binay as guest vice presidential candidate.
- Ernesto Mercado's United Action Team (UNA) is a Nacionalista Party affiliate, although Maria Lourdes Locsin, the party candidate for 1st District congresswoman, is also a Liberal Party and Lakas-Kampi CMD member.

=== Congressional election results ===
==== 1st District ====
Incumbent Teodoro Locsin Jr. is in his third consecutive term already and is ineligible for reelection. Makati councilor Monique Lagdameo is his party's nominee for the seat although his wife Maria Lourdes was a nominee of Lakas–CMD, Liberal Party and Nacionalista Party.

Philippine House of Representatives election at Makati's 1st district
Party	Candidate	Votes	%
PDP–Laban	Monique Lagdameo	42,102	33.52
Liberal	Maria Lourdes Locsin	41,860	33.32
Independent	Robert Dean Barbers	25,990	20.69
Bigkis	Oscar Ibay	14,993	11.94
KBL	Oswaldo Carbonell	668	0.53
Valid ballots		125,613	92.24
Invalid or blank votes		10,564	7.76
Total votes		136,177	100.00
PDP–Laban hold			

==== 2nd District ====
Abigail Binay is the incumbent. She defeated incumbent 2nd district councilor Ernesto "Aspi" Aspillaga, as well as John Christian Montes. Aspillaga placed the result of the election under protest in the House of Representatives Electoral Tribunal.

Philippine House of Representatives election at Makati's 2nd district
Party	Candidate	Votes	%
PDP–Laban	Abigail Binay	81,475	62.49
Nacionalista	Ernesto "Aspi" Aspillaga	35,497	27.23
Bigkis	John Christian Montes	13,402	10.28
Valid ballots		134,630	92.02
Invalid or blank votes		11,682	7.98
Total votes		146,312	100.00
PDP–Laban hold			

=== City Council elections ===
Each of Makati's two legislative districts elects eight councilors to the City Council. The eight candidates with the highest number of votes wins the seats per district. Some who are running are celebrities.

==== Summary ====
Party or alliance		Votes	%	Seats
United Action Team	Nacionalista Party	618,490	81.29	9
United Action Team	Nationalist People's Coalition	63,727	8.38	1
United Action Team	Independent	78,664	10.34	0
United Action Team	Total	760,881	100.00	10
Total		760,881	100.00	10

Party or alliance		Votes	%	Seats		
Team Binay	Partido Demokratiko Pilipino-Lakas ng Bayan	447,213	64.72	4		
Team Binay	Independent	243,806	35.28	2		
Team Binay	Total	691,019	100.00	6		
Team Binay	Total			691,019	100.00	6

Party or alliance		Votes	%	Seats
Bagong Makati, Bagong Mukha	Bigkis Pinoy Movement	294,468	100.00	0
Total		294,468	100.00	0

Party	Votes	%	Seats
Philippine Green Republican Party	5,276	6.28	0
Other Independents	78,685	93.72	0
Total	83,961	100.00	0

==== 1st District ====
Five out of eight Team Binay candidates were elected to the city council in this district; the other three were United Action Team candidates.

City Council election at Makati's 1st district
Party	Candidate	Votes	%
PDP–Laban	Ferdinand Jacinto "Ferdie Tangol" T. Eusebio	59,228	6.90
Nacionalista	Maria Concepcion "Ichi" M. Yabut	57,879	6.74
PDP–Laban	Tosca Camille T. Puno-Ramos	52,794	6.15
Nacionalista	Virgilio "VirJhong" V. Hilario, Sr.	50,815	5.92
PDP–Laban	Marie Alethea "Mayeth" S. Casal-Uy	48,903	5.69
Nacionalista	Manuel Monsour T. del Rosario III	48,753	5.68
Independent	Arnold "Idol" C. Magpantay	47,401	5.52
Independent	Romeo "Romy" C. Medina	44,537	5.19
Independent	Ferdinand V. Estrella	43,792	5.10
Independent	Luis "Jojo" S. Javier, Jr.	42,976	5.00
PDP–Laban	Armando "Idol" P. Padilla	42,353	4.93
Independent	Ma. Arlene M. Ortega	40,874	4.76
Nacionalista	Glenn C. Enciso	29,534	3.44
Nacionalista	Renato "Rene" L. Bondal	29,495	3.43
Nacionalista	Severino "Verong" L. Umandap	28,330	3.30
Nacionalista	Eduardo "Eddie" M. Ison	27,951	3.25
Bigkis	Pedro P. Dadula	20,907	2.43
Bigkis	Arnold J. Valenzuela	19,096	2.22
Bigkis	Wilfredo "Willy" M. Talag	17,983	2.09
Bigkis	Peter John C. Gonzalez	15,661	1.82
Bigkis	Jessielin "Jessy" O. Trinidad	14,025	1.63
Bigkis	Rodelio L. dela Cruz	12,797	1.49
Bigkis	Michael Dennis V. Reyes	11,601	1.35
Bigkis	Virgilio "Battle" R. Batalla	11,071	1.29
Independent	Racquel A. Manalili	8,885	1.03
Independent	Perfecto "Bambi" M. Santos	6,836	0.80
Independent	Otelio K. Jochico	6,809	0.79
Independent	Felicisimo P. Bascon Jr.	5,504	0.64
PGRP	Erlinda M. Lima	5,276	0.61
Independent	Edwin Lester S. Quiboloy	4,258	0.50
Independent	Remigio M. Jerusalem, Jr.	2,515	0.29
Total votes		858,659	100.00

==== 2nd District ====
Seven out of eight United Action Team candidates were elected to the city council in this district; only one Team Binay candidate got the lone remaining seat.

City Council election at Makati's 2nd district
Party	Candidate	Votes	%
Nacionalista	Vincent T. Sese	67,179	6.92%
NPC	Nemesio "King" S. Yabut, Jr.	63,727	6.56%
PDP–Laban	Nelson "Doc" S. Pasia	59,358	6.11%
Nacionalista	Salvador "Buddy" D. Pangilinan	57,077	5.88%
Nacionalista	Leonardo "Leo" M. Magpantay	55,914	5.76%
Nacionalista	Ma. Theresa "Tetchie" Nillo-de Lara	55,506	5.71%
Nacionalista	Mary Ruth Tolentino	55,198	5.68%
Nacionalista	Henry A. Jacome	54,859	5.65%
PDP–Laban	Joel A. Ibay	53,934	5.55
PDP–Laban	Angelito "Angie" D. Gatchalian	53,092	5.47
PDP–Laban	Evelyn Delfina "Bing E. Villamor	40,186	4.14
Bigkis	Elena B. Maccay	38,027	3.91
PDP–Laban	Jeline "Baby" M. Olfato	37,365	3.85
Independent	Juanito "Johnny" L. dela Cruz	34,872	3.59
Bigkis	Benedict "Bodik" B. Baniqued	30,455	3.13
Independent	Wenefreda "Wennie" M. Urena	30,071	3.10
Independent	Richard Reymund "Richie" R. Rodriguez	29,714	3.06
Bigkis	Catalina A. Balaoing	21,836	2.25
Bigkis	Ceferino "Jun" V. Peralta, Jr.	18,768	1.93
Bigkis	Virgilio G. Calimbahin, Jr.	17,217	1.77
Bigkis	Armando "Arman" I. Tercero	16,656	1.71
Bigkis	Abner D. Dreu	14,941	1.54
Independent	Antonio "Tony" G. Manalili	14,875	1.53
Bigkis	Gaspar "Pastor" E. Mapagdalita	13,427	1.38
Independent	Alberto P. Almario	8,743	0.90
Independent	Rodolfo "Rod" D. Biolena	8,233	0.85
Independent	Carlito F. Buenaventura	6,103	0.63
Independent	Alfredo N. Lapasaran	5,961	0.61
Independent	Nilo Z. Miranda	4,886	0.50
Independent	Nemesio "Manong" B. Beare	3,310	0.34
Total votes		971,490	100.00
