= Col. Billy Bibit, RAM =

Philippine biographical action film

Col. Billy Bibit RAM
- Directed by: William Mayo
- Screenplay by: Eddie Mayo; Henry Nadong
- Produced by: William Leary
- Starring: Rommel Padilla
- Cinematography: Vic Anao
- Edited by: Ruben Pantua
- Music by: Jaime Fabregas
- Production company: Viva Films
- Distributed by: Viva Films
- Release date: September 21, 1994
- Running time: 125 minutes
- Country: Philippines
- Language: Filipino

Col. Billy Bibit RAM is a 1994 Philippine biographical action film directed by William Mayo. The film stars Rommel Padilla in the title role. The film is based on the life of the late colonel Billy Bibit.

The film is streaming online on YouTube.

== Cast ==
- Rommel Padilla as Col. Billy Bibit
- Daniel Fernando as Capt. Lapeña
- Paquito Diaz as Hadji Muhran
- Efren Reyes Jr. as Abdul Hassim
- E. R. Ejercito as Salupdin
- Bing Loyzaga as Odette
- Robin Padilla as Col. Gringo Honasan
- Tonton Gutierrez as Tiger Tecson
- Dan Alvaro as Col. Rodolfo Aguinaldo
- Roi Vinzon as Col. Red Kapunan
- Jun Aristorenas as Gen. Gulang
- Dante Rivero as Gen. Custodio
- Lito Legaspi as Ret. Col. Sabello Bibit
- Conrad Poe as Muharet Muktar
- Orestes Ojeda as Bobby Tañada
- Pen Medina as Datu Kiram
- Manjo del Mundo as Col. Rodriguez
- Boy Alano as Informer
- Dexter Doria as Mother of Bibit
- Zandro Zamora as Bobby Barbers
- Alex David as Sgt. Gomez
- Romy Romulo as Mayor Omar Ali
- Nanding Fernandez as Cong. Anao
- Manny Rodriguez as Coun. Rino Antham
