= Robert Dean Barbers =

Filipino politician

Secretary of Tourism
- Acting
- In office January 5, 2004 – February 25, 2004
- President: Gloria Macapagal Arroyo
- Preceded by: Dick Gordon
- Succeeded by: Roberto Pagdanganan

General Manager of the Philippine Tourism Authority
- In office November 12, 2002 – July 31, 2008
- Preceded by: Nixon Kua
- Succeeded by: Mark Lapid

Member of the Makati City Council from the 1st district
- In office June 30, 1998 – June 30, 2001

Personal details
- Party: Independent (2009–present)
- Other political affiliations: Lakas (until 2001)
- Parent: Robert Barbers (father)

Robert Dean Smith Barbers is a Filipino government official who served as Acting Secretary of the Department of Tourism of the Philippines. He was also the general manager of the Philippine Tourism Authority (PTA) and a City Councilor of Makati. He is the youngest son of former Senator Robert Barbers and a brother of former Surigao del Norte Representative Ace Barbers.

He ran for vice mayor of Makati in 2001, but lost to Ernesto Mercado.

Barbers was appointed on November 12, 2002, as general manager of the Philippine Tourism Authority (PTA) by President Gloria Macapagal Arroyo. His appointment was legally challenged by his predecessor Nixon Kua who insisted his term should end in 2006, a case Kua lost. Barber's administration also sought the construction of the PTA Sports Complex within Intramuros which was halted by a court order in 2007.

Barbers' term expired in 2008. He was succeeded by Mark Lapid. He ran for representative of 1st district of Makati in 2010, but lost to Monique Lagdameo.

In 2025, Barbers and two other PTA officials were convicted and sentenced to up to eight years imprisonment for graft over the construction of the PTA Sports Complex.
