= Last Stand at Khe Sanh: The U.S. Marines' Finest Hour in Vietnam =

- Author: Gregg Jones
- Language: English
- Subject: Vietnam War
- Publisher: Da Capo Press
- Publication date: April 2014
- Publication place: United States
- Media type: Print
- Pages: 358 pp
- ISBN: 0306821397 (hardcover) 9780306821394 (hardcover)

Last Stand at Khe Sanh: The U.S. Marines' Finest Hour in Vietnam is a book written by American journalist Gregg Jones and published by Da Capo Press in April 2014. It is Jones' third book.

== Content ==
Last Stand at Khe Sanh: The U.S. Marines' Finest Hour in Vietnam illustrates, using extensive archival research, in-depth interviews, and oral histories, the 77-day siege of a Marine combat base at Khe Sanh, South Vietnam in 1968 as experienced by the men who fought it. This battle marked the first time the U.S. military abandoned an operating base under enemy pressure in Vietnam, and is considered a critical moment in America's failed war.

== Recognition ==
Marine Corps Heritage Foundation 2015 General Wallace M. Greene, Jr. Award for distinguished nonfiction.
