= Gregg Jones =

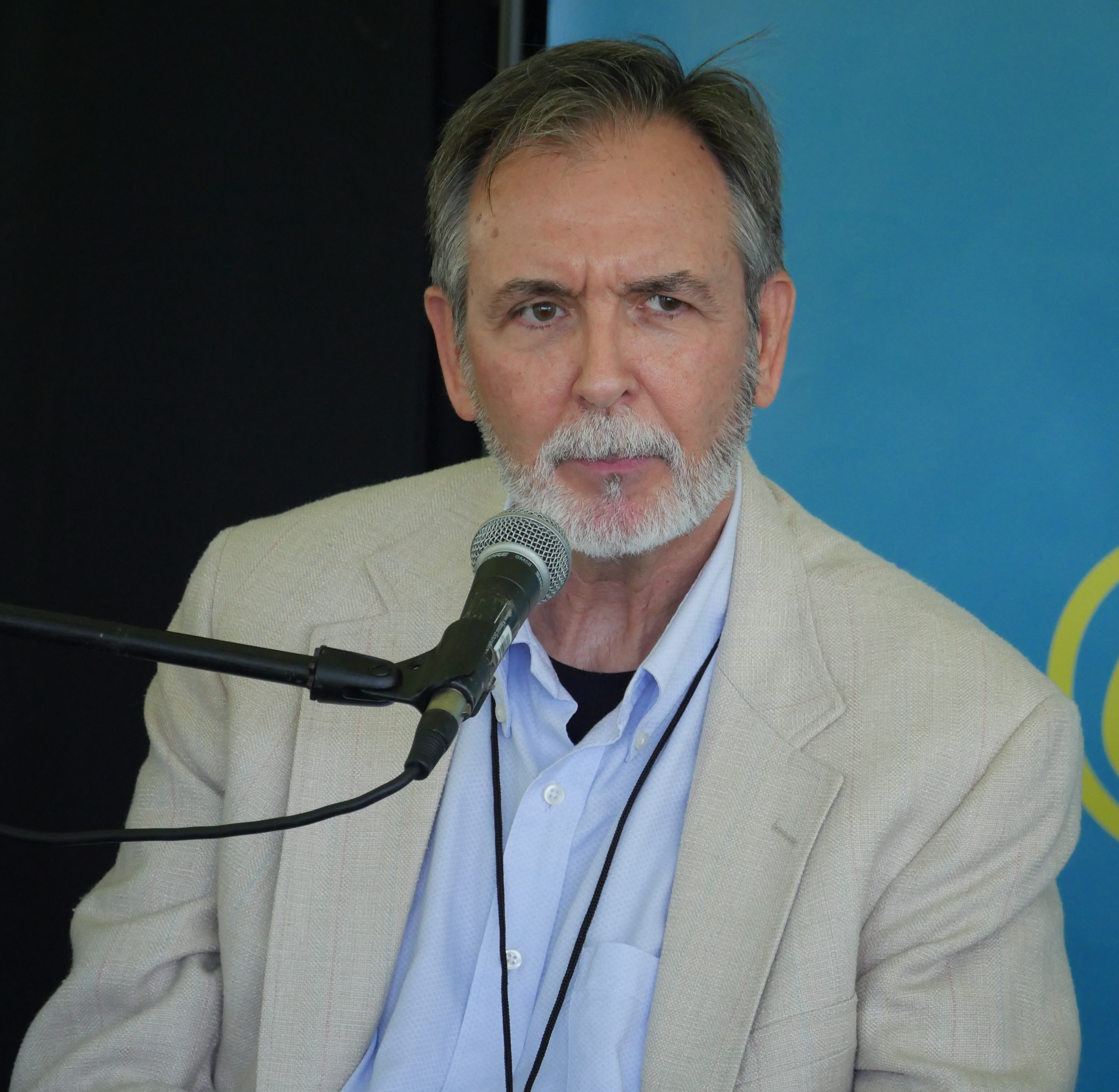
- Born: 1959 (age 66–67); Poplar Bluff, Missouri
- Occupations: Journalist, writer
- Children: Chris Jones
- Writing career
- Language: English
- Genre: Historical journalism
- Subject: American military involvement in Asia
- Notable awards: Pulitzer Prize finalist, Kluge Fellow by the Black Mountain Institute at University of Nevada
- Website: greggjonesbooks.com

Gregg Jones (born 1959) is an American journalist and the author of four critically acclaimed non-fiction books. He has been a finalist for the Pulitzer Prize, and was selected as a 2015–2016 Kluge Fellow by the Black Mountain Institute at University of Nevada, Las Vegas and the John W. Kluge Center at the Library of Congress.

== Career ==
A native of Poplar Bluff, Missouri, United States, on the edge of the Missouri Ozarks, Jones began his journalism career in 1981 as a reporter for the Roanoke Times and World-News in Virginia. He was a staff writer for the Atlanta Journal-Constitution before moving to the Philippines in May 1984 to work as a freelance foreign correspondent. He wrote primarily for several U.S. and British newspapers, including the Washington Post and The Guardian. He covered the 1986 People Power Revolution that toppled dictator Ferdinand Marcos and elevated Corazon Aquino to power.

While covering news developments in the Philippines, Jones wrote his first book, Red Revolution: Inside the Philippine Guerrilla Movement, published in 1989 by Westview Press. It chronicles the rise of the revolutionary movement launched in 1968–69 by the Communist Party of the Philippines and its armed wing, the New People’s Army. Jones based the book on interviews he conducted during eight trips into guerrilla-held "red zones" in the Philippines and documents obtained from official and underground sources. In a three-page Atlantic Monthly review of Red Revolution in September 1989, James Fallows noted the rare access that Jones had gained in penetrating the communist underground and his groundbreaking reporting on the revolutionary movement’s development and operations. The New York Times Sunday Book Review called Red Revolution "a volume of painstaking detail that will long serve as an authoritative reference for Philippine specialists and students of modern guerrilla movements." Pulitzer Prize-winning historian Stanley Karnow, writing in The Washington Post, called Red Revolution "by far the best account yet to appear on the New People's Army."

Jones was a finalist for a Pulitzer Prize in 1992 for a series of articles he wrote about deaths and suffering that resulted from the lack of healthcare access in rural Arkansas. He was a staff writer for the Dallas Morning News, writing about defense and energy issues, before opening an Asia bureau for the paper in 1997. In the aftermath of the 9/11 attacks on the United States in 2001, Jones reported from Pakistan and Afghanistan on the U.S. military response, the pursuit of Osama bin Laden at Tora Bora, and the poverty and hardship confronting the Afghan people after decades of war. After leaving Asia in 2002, Jones joined the staff of the Los Angeles Times in the newspaper’s state capital bureau in Sacramento, California. He covered the 2002 re-election campaign of Governor Gray Davis and the 2003 California gubernatorial recall election in which Davis was removed from office and replaced by actor Arnold Schwarzenegger. Jones conducted the first interview with Davis after his ouster, and described in a live CNN interview with Judy Woodruff how the famously stoic governor fought back tears as he talked about his historic fall. Jones rejoined the Dallas Morning News as an investigative reporter in 2004 and left daily journalism in 2010.

In his second book, Honor in the Dust: Theodore Roosevelt, War in the Philippines, and the Rise and Fall of America’s Imperial Dream, published by NAL/Penguin in 2012, Jones examined the largely forgotten Philippine–American War and the war crimes scandal that marred the first year of Theodore Roosevelt's presidency. Writing in the New York Times Sunday Book Review in February 2012, author Candice Millard observed, "What is striking about Honor in the Dust, Gregg Jones’s fascinating new book about the Philippine–American War, is not how much war has changed in more than a century, but how little. On nearly every page, there is a scene that feels as if it could have taken place during the Bush and Obama administrations rather than those of McKinley and Roosevelt." Millard concluded, "In the end, Honor in the Dust is less about the freedom of the Philippines than the soul of the United States. This is the story of what happened when a powerful young country and its zealous young president were forced to face the high cost of their ambitions."

His third book, Last Stand at Khe Sanh: The U.S. Marines’ Finest Hour in Vietnam, published by Da Capo Press in April 2014, tells the story of the 77-day siege of a Marine combat base at Khe Sanh, South Vietnam in 1968, a critical moment in America's failed war in Vietnam. Last Stand at Khe Sanh received the 2015 General Wallace M. Greene, Jr. Award for distinguished nonfiction from the Marine Corps Heritage Foundation. In a Leatherneck Magazine review in July 2014, Maj. Robert T. Jordan, USMC (Ret.) wrote: "The result of Jones’ efforts is a classic that echoes the passion of Erich Maria Remarque’s World War I novel, "All Quiet on the Western Front"; Leon Uris’ "Battle Cry," a World War II classic; and the intensity of the 1992 book about the Vietnam War—"We Were Soldiers Once … and Young" by Lieutenant General Harold G. Moore, U.S. Army (Ret.) and war journalist Joseph L. Galloway."

== Works ==
- Red Revolution: Inside the Philippine Guerrilla Movement, Westview Press, Boulder, Colorado, 1989. ISBN 0813306442.
- Honor in the Dust: Theodore Roosevelt, War in the Philippines, and the Rise and Fall of America’s Imperial Dream, NAL/Penguin, New York, 2012. ISBN 0451229045
- Last Stand at Khe Sanh: The U.S. Marines’ Finest Hour in Vietnam, Da Capo Press, New York, 2014. ISBN 0306821397
- Most Honorable Son. Citadel Press. 2024-07-23. ISBN 978-0-8065-4295-9.
