= Robert Barbers =

Filipino politician (1944–2005)

Senator of the Philippines
- In office June 30, 1998 – June 30, 2004

16th Secretary of the Interior and Local Government
- In office April 16, 1996 – February 3, 1998
- President: Fidel V. Ramos
- Preceded by: Rafael Alunan III
- Succeeded by: Epimaco Velasco

Member of the Philippine House of Representatives from Surigao del Norte's 2nd district
- In office June 30, 1992 – April 15, 1996
- Preceded by: Constantino Navarro Sr.
- Succeeded by: Ace Barbers

Personal details
- Born: Robert Zabala Barbers; January 19, 1944 Surigao, Surigao, Philippines
- Died: December 25, 2005 (aged 61) Pasig, Philippines
- Resting place: Manila Memorial Park – Sucat
- Party: Lakas (1995–2005)
- Other political affiliations: Nacionalista (1992–1995)
- Spouse: Virginia Smith
- Children: with Smith: 4, including Ace and Dean out of wedlock: 4
- Education: Silliman University; Lyceum of the Philippines University (BA, LL.B); National Defense College of the Philippines (MS, MNSA)
- Occupation: Politician
- Profession: Police officer
- Nickname: Bobby
- Police career
- Service: Philippine Constabulary; Integrated National Police
- Allegiance: Philippines
- Divisions: Western Police District
- Rank: Police Colonel

Robert Zabala Barbers (Note: Records from the Senate stated his middle name as Zabala; while a column from The Philippine Star later mentioned Zagala.) (January 19, 1944 – December 25, 2005) was a Filipino police officer and politician. Barbers had served in the police force for almost three decades prior to becoming part of the government of the Philippines. He served in the legislature as the representative of the second district of Surigao del Norte (1992–1996), whose second term was ended by his appointment as secretary of the interior and local government, and as senator (1998–2004).

== Early life and education ==
Barbers was born in the then-municipality of Surigao in formerly undivided Surigao province, on January 19, 1944, to Félix Barbers of Ilocos, a judge, and Regina Zabala of Surigao, who would serve as division superintendent of schools and vice governor of Surigao del Norte.

His ancestors, the Barbieri clan, originally came from Sicily, Italy, with his grandfather being an American soldier. Meanwhile, the family's local roots are in Cabugao, Ilocos Sur. His paternal uncle, retired police general James Barbers, was a Vice Mayor of Manila and superintendent of the Western Police District.

Barbers finished elementary (1955) and secondary education (1959, as valedictorian) in his hometown.

While serving as a police officer, he studied AB Political Science at the University of the Philippines and Silliman University but completed his degree in 1981 at the Lyceum of the Philippines University, where he also earned his Bachelor of Laws in 1985. While in UP, he joined the Alpha Phi Beta Fraternity in its Batch 1959.

He later went on to earn Master of Science degrees in criminology (Metro Manila College) and in national security administration (National Defense College) in 1992 and 1994, respectively.

== Police career ==
Barbers was enlisted by his uncle James, then chief of the Integrated National Police – Western Police District (INP–WPD), in the police force, and topped the examinations in the Manila Police Department (MPD). He spent 27 years as a police officer in the city. He started in 1960s as a patrolman, and later rose through the ranks, eventually becoming colonel before quitting the police force in 1991 to run for Congress.

Barbers served as chief of the Ermita station and, under the leadership of Alfredo Lim in the WPD, of two WPD divisions handling high-profile crimes. When Lim became the director of the National Bureau of Investigation in 1990, he took Barbers and designated him as chief of the NBI Police Special Task Force. He was also the inspector of the National Police Commission.

Barbers was noted for the solution of major crimes and the personal arrest of some of the known gang leaders, particularly when he was with the NBI with his team being known with the arrest of several drug traffickers, including Jose "Don Pepe" Oyson who was later killed by agents while being escorted to detention. He was also credited with the arrest of then military rebel Billy Bibit and communist leader Ignacio Capegsan, for which he was promoted.

Barbers was a bemedaled officer, receiving medals and citations from the United States, such as those from the State Department and the Golden Service Award for Outstanding Law Enforcer in Asia from New York City (the first Filipino to be given the award, in 1991).

== Political career ==
=== As district representative ===
Barbers entered politics in 1992 as representative of the second district of Surigao del Norte; he was re-elected in 1995.

He was the chairperson of the House committee on Effective Law Enforcement, as well as vice chairperson of the committee on Public Order and Security.

=== As a cabinet chief ===
Barbers' second term in the 10th Congress was cut short when he became part of the cabinet of president Fidel Ramos, who appointed him as secretary of the interior and local government which he assumed on April 16, 1996.

While focusing on campaign against illegal drugs, he launched programs in relation to fight against criminality, as well as for the reformation and welfare of the Philippine National Police.

Barbers was noted being the supervisor of the PNP, which created the Public Assistance and Reaction Against Crime (PARAC), a 24-hour public assistance group. Among the notable accomplishments of PARAC within a year were the apprehension of drug traffickers and a gambling lord, neutralization of eight of the country's most wanted individuals including a Laguna politician involved in the murder of a human rights lawyer, as well as the eradication of marijuana plantations in northern Luzon.

Another program, Barangay at Pulisya Laban sa Krimen, was implemented to strengthen community involvement in the peace and order campaign.

=== As a senator ===
Barbers first ran for senator in 1998, where he placed fifth, becoming the first police officer to hold such electoral position. He served a term, in the 11th and 12th Congresses.

In 1999, Barbers pushed for the creation of the committee on public order and illegal drugs, which he eventually headed. He was also a chairperson of the Commission on Appointments subcommittee on local governments.

Barbers was noted still being active in law enforcement in his term; he authored over a hundred bills mainly focusing on the fight against criminality.

Barbers was the first to file an anti-terrorism bill in the Senate, in late 2001.

Barbers was the principal author of a bill that aimed to strengthen the campaign against drug trafficking, which later became Republic Act No. 9165 (Comprehensive Dangerous Drugs Act of 2002), the law repealing RA No. 6425 (Dangerous Drugs Act of 1972) and creating the Philippine Drug Enforcement Agency to be a member of and the implementing arm of the Dangerous Drugs Board.

Barbers authored as well laws that giving more penalties against jueteng protectors and operators.

He was an advocate of death penalty for heinous crimes.

For his campaign against illegal drugs, Barbers was given an award from the International Narcotics Enforcement Officers Association in Orlando, Florida in 2002.

==== 1998 and 2004 elections ====
Barbers, a stalwart of the Lakas, was twice considered as running mate to then presidential candidates, Jose de Venecia Jr. in 1998 and incumbent Gloria Macapagal Arroyo in 2004. He was later convinced to give way to Arroyo and to then senator Noli de Castro, respectively. De Venecia was defeated by Joseph Estrada; while Arroyo won and later ascended to the presidency, replacing Estrada who was then ousted.

In 2004, Barbers ran for re-election under the ruling party, but lost in the twelfth spot to incumbent Rodolfo Biazon. Both ran under the administration K-4 coalition. He later filed an election protest against Biazon to contest the slot, accusing the Commission on Elections of hastily proclaiming the latter's victory and demanding the awaiting of the results in his strongholds in Mindanao. However, his petition was denied.

His name was mentioned in the controversial "Hello Garci" tapes, whose transcripts showed him calling then election commissioner Virgilio Garcillano to ensure his victory.

== Personal life ==
Bobby, as Barbers was known to many, was married to Virginia Smith. They had four children—three sons, all also named Robert, and a daughter.

- Robert Lyndon, the eldest who is currently serving as governor of Surigao del Norte, previously held the same position within two terms. He was one of the directors of the Department of Tourism (DOT). In 2010, he ran for Surigao City mayor but lost.
- Robert Ace is currently serving his sixth term as the representative of the province's second district, the position which Robert had previously held. He also served as provincial governor until 2010 when he lost in his re-election bid; at that time the family's political control in the province ended with the defeat of his two brothers as well.
- Robert Dean, the youngest son, served as a councilor in Makati and held cabinet positions during the Arroyo administration, being named officer-in-charge of the DOT and general manager and CEO of the Philippine Tourism Authority. In 2010, he ran for Makati 1st district representative, but lost.
- The youngest child and only daughter, worked with the Metropolitan Manila Development Authority. (Note: Two newspaper articles stated the name of Barbers' only daughter differently; it is either Josephine or Mary Grace.)

Barbers was a practising Roman Catholic, and a pious devotee of the Infant Jesus of Prague. He had a statue of the Christ Child in his office dressed as a policeman, called the "Santo Niño de Policía", and brought out in procession every January. In 1995, he formed a group of fellow devotees comprising workers of a folk music bar in Malate, Manila, which he once frequented as a policeman.

== Later life and death ==
Barbers, who had suffered throat cancer, flew to the United States and underwent surgery in November 2000, missing the impeachment trial of President Joseph Estrada in the Senate.

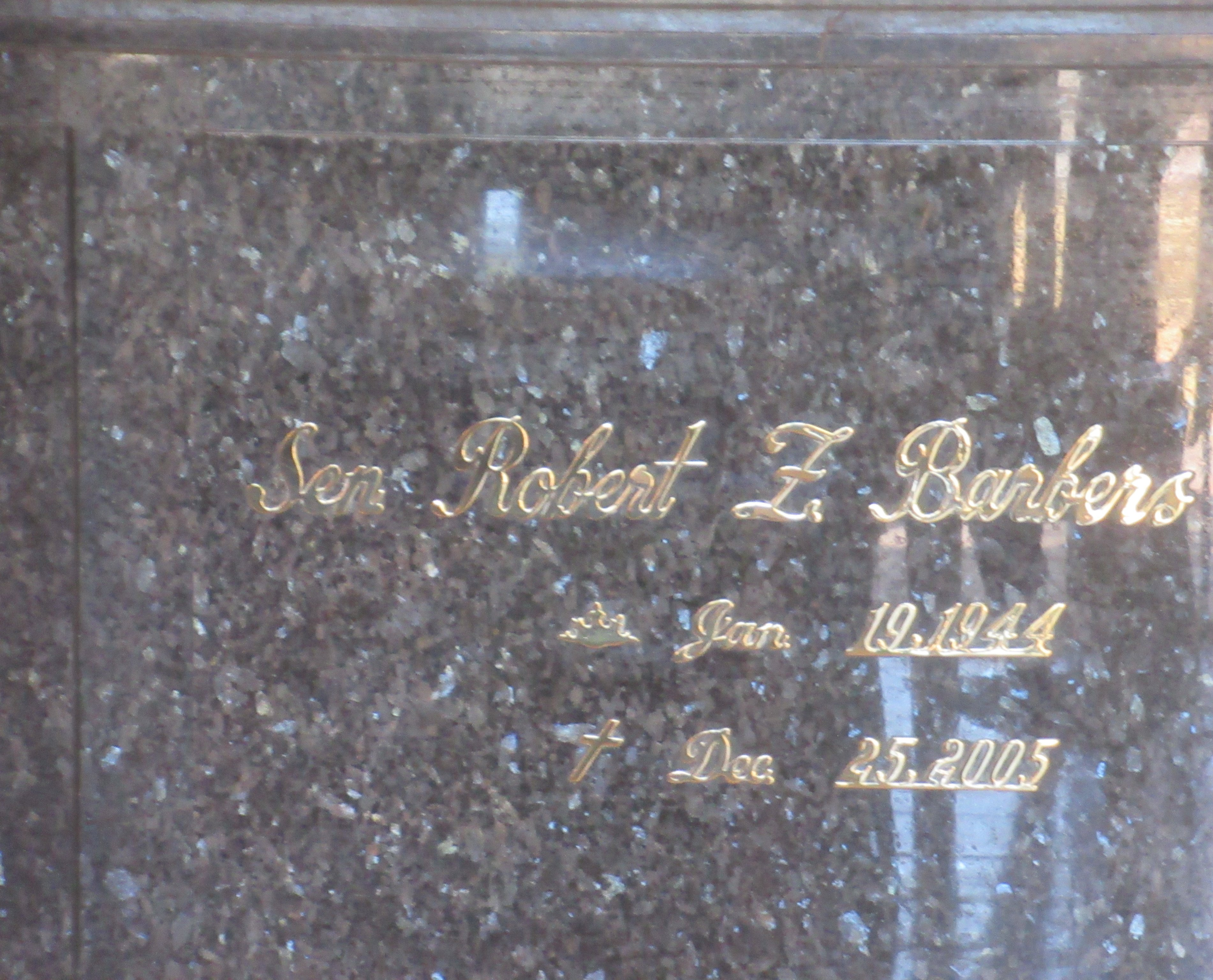
Barber's grave at Manila Memorial Park – Sucat.

In July 2005, Barbers left one last time for the United States to have a medical checkup. In early December that year, he was confined at The Medical City in Pasig for a week. His condition deteriorated until Christmas Eve, when he was rushed to the same hospital due to difficulty breathing.

Barbers died of heart failure at 10:29 a.m. on Christmas Day 2005. He was buried at the Manila Memorial Park – Sucat in Parañaque.

== In popular culture ==
- Portrayed by Phillip Salvador in the 1997 film Bobby Barbers: Parak.
- Portrayed by Zandro Zamora in the 1994 film "Col. Billy Bibit, RAM".
