= Billy Bibit =

Filipino Military Officer

Billy C. Bibit
- Born: March 10, 1950
- Died: October 25, 2009 (aged 59)
- Buried: Heritage Park, Fort Bonifacio
- Allegiance: Philippines
- Branch: Philippine Constabulary
- Rank: Lieutenant Colonel
- Known for: Coup attempts against President Corazon Aquino a member of Reform the Armed Forces Movement (RAM)
- Education: Philippine Military Academy

Billy C. Bibit (March 10, 1950 – October 25, 2009) was a Filipino colonel and a Philippine Constabulary lieutenant colonel who led a series of attempted coups against former President of the Philippines Corazon Aquino during the 1980s as a member of the Revolutionary Patriot Alliance (Rebolusyonaryong Alyansang Makabayan, RAM).

Bibit graduated from the Philippine Military Academy (PMA) in 1972. He became a founding member of both the RAM and the Guardians Brotherhood.

Bibit was described as a close ally of Senator Gregorio Honasan, who had founded the RAM and led a series of coup attempts against the Aquino administration. In December 1989, he was one of the RAM members who took over the Port of Manila with him leading RAM personnel to controlling main entrances and exits of the port's North and South Harbors. He was sentenced to nine years in jail for rebellion and murder on July 20, 1992.

Aquino later appointed Bibit to a position in the Bureau of Customs. He campaigned for a seat in the Congress of the Philippines in 1992, but lost the election. Bibit later worked in the Economic Intelligence and Investigation Bureau during the early years of the administration of President Gloria Macapagal.

Bibit was hospitalized for the last three years of his life. He died at 9:52 p.m. on October 25, 2009, due to complications of a stroke that happened three years before his death. His funeral took place at Chapel 6 at the Heritage Park in Fort Bonifacio.

== In popular culture ==
- Bibit was portrayed by actor Rommel Padilla in the 1994 biographical film Col. Billy Bibit RAM.
