= A Dangerous Life =

1988 Australian film

- Written by: David Williamson
- Directed by: Robert Markowitz (char)
- Starring: Gary Busey; Rebecca Gilling
- Music by: Brian May
- Country of origin: Australia
- Original languages: English; Filipino

Production
- Producer: Hal McElroy
- Cinematography: James Bartle
- Editors: Michael Honey and Tony Kavanagh
- Running time: 6 hours (HBO cable tv); 162 minutes (television)
- Production company: Australian Broadcasting Corporation

Original release
- Release: 27 November 1988

The Four Day Revolution (broadcast in the Philippines as A Dangerous Life) is a 1988 Australian television film directed by Robert Markowitz and written by David Williamson. The story is about the journey and the love affair of an American foreign correspondent set during the final years of Ferdinand Marcos' dictatorship in the Philippines, from the assassination of Benigno Aquino Jr. in 1983 to the People Power Revolution in 1986, as well as other key events that led to the ouster of Marcos.

The film stars Gary Busey as American news correspondent Tony O'Neill, and Rebecca Gilling as his estranged journalist wife Angie. It also stars Tessie Tomas as Imelda Marcos and Laurice Guillen as Corazon Aquino, whose performances received critical acclaim. It was shot on location in Manila, Philippines; Colombo, Sri Lanka; and Sydney, Brisbane, and Melbourne, Australia.

== Plot ==
In 1983, after being informed by Fabian Ver of Senator Ninoy Aquino's arrival, Imelda Marcos informs her husband President Ferdinand Marcos about her warning to Aquino not to return to the Philippines due to threats to his life.

In the Philippines, American journalist Tony O'Neill is driven by his cameraman and technical operator Ramon to Manila International Airport to cover Aquino's arrival. Inside the terminal, Tony and other journalists witness the arrival of Ninoy's aircraft and await him. Seconds later, Aquino is shot along with Rolando Galman. The gunfire forces Tony and the other journalists to leave the scene as Aquino's body is loaded to a van. Tony asks Ramon if he filmed the entire incident, wherein the latter only responds that he failed to do so as everything "happened too fast".

In Boston, a telephone call informs Corazon Aquino of her husband's death. She and her family fly to the Philippines, vowing to seek justice for her husband. The day after the assassination, Marcos and General Prospero Olivas preside over the initial investigation of Aquino's assassination, denying any wrongdoing.

O'Neill covers Aquino's funeral and calls it as "larger than that of Gandhi's" and decides to cover the unfolding political crisis in the country. In the course of his reporting, he is invited by Imelda to Malacañang in an unsuccessful attempt to tone down his coverage, while developing a relationship with Celie, the niece of local newspaper publisher Ben Balamo. During a protest, Celie's brother Emilio is killed by security forces, while she herself is detained and sexually abused by the security forces, pushing her to join the New People's Army before deserting due to post-traumatic stress disorder and being extrajudicially killed by government forces.

Behind these events, Defense Minister Juan Ponce Enrile and a group of disgruntled soldiers plot Marcos' overthrow in a coup d'état while liaising with Cory and other dissident minds, while Gens. Ver and Olivas are tried and acquitted for their role in the Aquino assassination. In 1985, Marcos agrees to a snap election scheduled for 7 February the following year. An initially reluctant Cory agrees to challenge Marcos, with the resulting campaign being marred in violence. Gen. Olivas secretly warns Ben of a top-secret plan to eliminate dissidents, including Ben, after the election.

On Election Day, goons harass Tony and Ramon, while the fraudulent result in favor of Marcos leads to more upheavals with the Aquino camp calling for civil disobedience. On 22 February, Enrile learns that his plot against Marcos has been discovered. With Deputy Armed Forces of the Philippines Chief of Staff General Fidel Ramos and other dissident soldiers, they barricade themselves in Camp Aguinaldo. Desperate, they call Cory Aquino and Manila Archbishop Cardinal Jaime Sin for support. The latter obliges by calling on the faithful to defend the dissidents on EDSA. The next three days see the unfolding of the People Power Revolution, and after attempts by the Marcoses to take back control, they finally realize their defeat and flee into exile with American help. With the Marcoses gone, the people seize control of Malacañang and Aquino assumes full control as President. As celebrations erupt, Tony reconciles with his estranged journalist wife Angie.

== Cast ==
=== Fictional characters ===
- Gary Busey as Tony O'Neil, an American television journalist and news correspondent who is sent to Manila to cover Ninoy Aquino's return and chooses to stay longer to cover the unfolding political crisis.
- Rebecca Gilling as Angie Fox, the estranged wife of Tony O'Neill who is also a journalist.
- James Handy as Mike Heseltine
- Roy Alvarez as Colonel "Tiger" Tecson, a fictional colonel who is the colleague of Lieutenant Colonel Red Kapunan and Colonel Gringo Honasan. In real life, Alvarez had a physical resemblance to Honasan and was supposed to play him in the film but the producers felt he was better suited as Angie's love interest.
- Guy Stone as Peter
- Alexander Cortez as Raoul
- Jaime Fabregas as Ben Balamo, a Manila newspaper publisher critical of the Marcoses.
- Dina Bonnevie as Celie Balamo, the niece of Ben whom Tony falls in love with. Though uncredited in the film, her performance was highly praised by Philippine media.
- Spanky Manikan as Ramon, Tony's Filipino cameraman
- Grace Parr as New York Times Secretary
- Arthur Sherman as Alex, the president and chief broadcaster of Tony's news agency.
- Arianthe Galani as Josephine Reyes
- Betty Mae Piccio as Computer Operator
- Dido de la Paz as Colonel Cruz
- Val Victa as Emilio Balamo, Celie's brother who is a radical activist.
- Bon Vibar as A Bishop
- Anita Linda

=== Historical figures ===
- Ruben Rustia as President Ferdinand Marcos, the sitting Philippine president. Despite some of his attitudes in the film being similar to the real Marcos on account of strict demeanor, his healthy condition was criticised for its inaccuracy by critics, historians, and media alike; the real Marcos was in a critical state of deteriorating health at the time the film was set. Nevertheless, Rustia's portrayal was praised for his acting.
- Laurice Guillen as Corazon Aquino, the widow of Benigno Aquino Jr. who later becomes president in the film's conclusion. Like Rustia's performance of Marcos, Guillen's portrayal of Aquino was praised by Philippine media for her acting while also simultaneously heavily criticised for the inaccurate design of her prosthetic nose makeup. The real Corazon Aquino is shown in archival footage addressing the US Congress in the final scene.
- Tessie Tomas as First Lady Imelda Marcos
- Cris Vertido as Salvador "Doy" Laurel, Cory's running-mate in the Snap Elections
- Robert Talabis as Joker Arroyo
- Mervyn Samson as General Fabian Ver, AFP Chief of Staff
- Joonee Gamboa as Defense Minister Juan "Johnny" Ponce Enrile
- Ray Ventura as General Fidel "Eddie" Ramos, AFP Vice Chief of Staff
- Johnny Delgado as Lieutenant Colonel Eduardo "Red" Kapunan Jr. Delgado and Laurice Guillen were married in real-life during production until the former's death in 2009.
- Rez Cortez as Colonel Gregorio "Gringo" Honasan
- Rolando Tinio as Manila Archbishop Cardinal Jaime Sin
- Noel Trinidad as Jimmy Ongpin
- Tony Carreon as Ramon Mitra Jr. Carreon was chosen to play the role due to his physical and facial resemblance to the real Mitra.
- Vic Diaz as Major General Prospero Olivas, Chief of the Metropolitan Command (METROCOM)
- Amiel Leonardia as Peping Cojuangco, the younger brother of Cory Aquino
- Lea Cabusi as Kris Aquino, the youngest of the Aquinos
- Freddie Santos as Butz Aquino, Ninoy's younger brother
- Michael Pate as Stephen W. Bosworth, US ambassador to the Philippines
- Pen Medina as Major Edgardo Doromal
- Tony Mabesa as Ernesto Herrera
- Felindo Obach as Brigadier General Artemio Tadiar
- Junix Inocian as Evelio Javier
- Odette Khan as June Keithley
- Mona Lisa as Francisca Monzon
- Joe Gruta as Colonel Antonio Sotelo
- Benigno Aquino Jr. as himself (interviewed before his assassination). An uncredited actor plays him during the assassination scene.
- Dave Brodette as Rolando Galman, the alleged killer of Benigno Aquino Jr.
- Zeneida Amador as Justice Corazon Agrava
- Ernie Zarate as Andres Narvasa
- Pudji Waseso as Father Socrates Villegas

== Production ==
Production credits

- Robert Markowitz – director
- Brian May – composer
- James Bartle – cinematographer

On 18 November 1987, producer Hal McElroy sent a letter to President Corazon Aquino informing her of his and director Robert Markowitz's intention to film a miniseries in the Philippines the following year titled A Dangerous Life, about the People Power Revolution. The planned budget would be $11 million, and the completion date in August 1988. By December, the film was revealed to have an additional title: The Four Day Revolution, and the fictitious character of Ben Ayala was renamed Ben Balamo. McElroy was advised by the local producer Lope V. Juban to first consult with the major figures to be depicted, such as Fidel V. Ramos and Juan Ponce Enrile.

After McElroy sent a letter to Enrile on 16 December informing him of the miniseries and its details, Enrile sent a letter back to McElroy five days later, alerting him that he will not approve of any screen depiction of him or his family. Respecting Enrile's wish, the filmmakers subsequently removed his character from the script as well as any references to him and proceeded with the production.

=== Lawsuit ===
On 23 February 1988, Enrile filed a complaint to the Regional Trial Court (RTC) of Makati, alleging that the continued production of the miniseries without his consent is a violation of his right to privacy, with the court issuing a temporary restraining order on the filmmakers a day later. By 9 March, McElroy filed a motion to dismiss the complaint, arguing that the miniseries will not feature Enrile as a character, but a week later the RTC nevertheless went forth and issued a writ of preliminary injunction halting its production.

After the case was brought the Supreme Court, a decision was reached on 29 April to allow production to continue, for the reason that Enrile, a senator, is a public figure and thus his right to privacy is more narrow, and cannot be used to override the "publication and dissemination of matters of public interest." Colonel Gregorio Honasan, a former military aide to Enrile, also filed a similar complaint in court against the miniseries' production company, but it was eventually waived due to his being a "fugitive of justice."

=== Filming locations ===
Although the film was shot on location in the Philippines, some scenes, including the climactic People Power Revolution, were shot in Sri Lanka, mostly due to political and legal pressures from Juan Ponce Enrile who did not like to be portrayed in a screen work (a fictional version of him was still portrayed by Joonee Gamboa); by March 1988, the crew left the Philippines to finish the production elsewhere. Other reasons were that the producers had experienced similar conflicts when filming a similar film, The Year of Living Dangerously in 1981 in Manila.

The Aquino assassination scene was filmed on the actual location where the assassination occurred. To replicate the event, the production leased a China Airlines Boeing 767 with the registration B-1836, the same aircraft that carried Ninoy, for filming. The plane was later retired from China Airlines when 747-400's were ordered and delivered.

Some scenes were shot in Australia. The scene of Butz Aquino calling from Camp Crame was shot in Sydney.

== Release ==
- Australia – ABC, one of the companies who helped in producing the film, broadcast the film in 1989 under the title, The Four-Day Revolution. The film was released on home video in the country though CIC-Taft Home Video.
- Spain – the film was once shown in Spain under the title, Una Vida Peligrosa.
- Canada – the movie was released on home video in Canada in 1989 through Nova Home Video.
- Finland – the film was once shown in Finland under the title, Vaarallista elämää.
- Indonesia – the film was once shown in Indonesia under the title,Revolusi 4 hari airing TVRI, RCTI, SCTV (TV network) and ANTV premiered in 1990s during May 1998 riots of Indonesia.
- South Korea – the film was once shown in South Korea under the title, wiheomhan saenghwal (Korean: 위험한 생활).
- Philippines – ABS-CBN first broadcast the film on 11 December 1988 and the network's first marathon broadcast via satellite and was also the first major Australian production to air on the network. ABS-CBN re-aired the film during Holy Week 2010. Both stations aired the film during commemorations of the Ninoy Aquino assassination and EDSA 1986, most notably the 25th and 30th anniversaries of both events.
- United States – HBO broadcast the film on 27 November 1988. The film was released on home video in the country by ITC Home Video (distributed by J2 Communications).
- West Germany – the film was once shown in Germany under the title, Ein gefährliches Leben.
- Japan – the film was once shown in Japan under the title, Kiken'na seikatsu (Japanese: 危険な生活).
- United Kingdom - It was co-produced by Central and former sister company Zenith Productions and shown on the ITV Network in April 1989 presented by Central and distributed worldwide by ITC Entertainment (now distributed by ITV Studios Global Entertainment).

=== Critical response ===
Howard Rosenberg of the L.A. Times gave A Dangerous Life a positive review, stating that it is "masterful, simply mesmerizing", and noted that though it takes some artistic license with history, "As drama, [...] "A Dangerous Life" is irresistible, six hours of tingly, high-charged TV that are as volatile, ironic and suspenseful as the history they purport to re-enact". He otherwise griped about romantic subplot of Tony as "lack[ing] validity and occasionally slow[ing] the story".

Manila Standard columnist Emil P. Jurado disparaged A Dangerous Life, calling it an "insult to the Filipino people... and to the heroes of EDSA in particular" for its poor acting, conspicuously Sri Lankan extras, and treatment of foreigners as the main heroes. Jurado, however, noted "flashes of brilliance" from the performances of Laurice Guillen and Tessie Tomas as Corazon Aquino and Imelda Marcos respectively. Karla Delgado, also of the Manila Standard, gave a negative review to the miniseries, deeming it "misfocused" due to the inclusion of a fictional romantic subplot, which she thought was less interesting than the real events depicted. Nevertheless, Delgado praised Tomas' "dramatic" performance as Imelda and Ruben Rustia's "perfected" mannerisms and voice of Ferdinand. Columnist Petronilo Bn. Daroy stated that even with its inaccuracies to the events of the revolution, "[a]s art, as film, A Dangerous Life is unexciting." Actress Armida Siguion Reyna found the miniseries "boring", expressing that it is likely due to the story being "recent Philippine history" and lacking any new insight. She also stated that the miniseries "is unkind to Juan Ponce-Enrile who is portrayed as almost a coward," while giving praise to the performance of Tomas, whom she considered "so believable in the role [of Imelda]."
