= Rolex 12 =

Advisors to President Marcos, 1972 to 1981

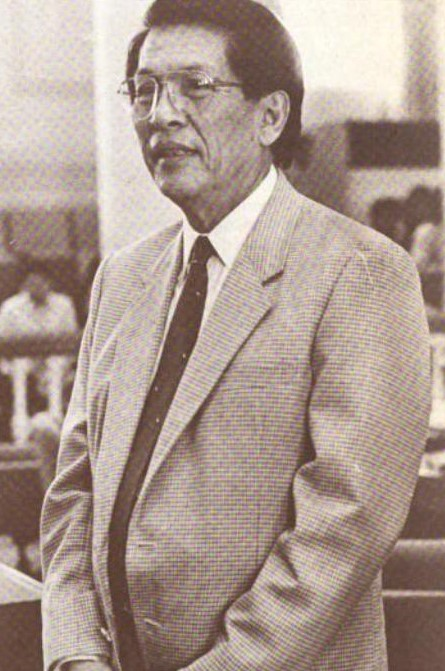
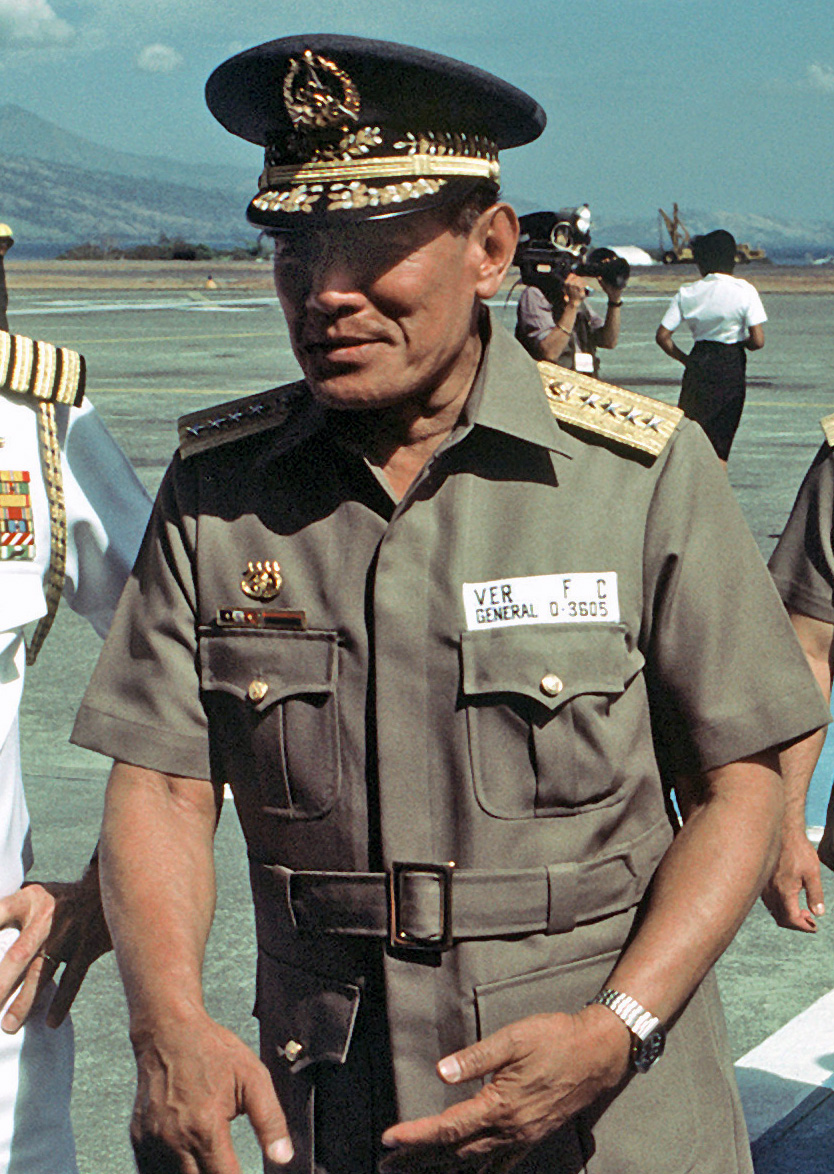
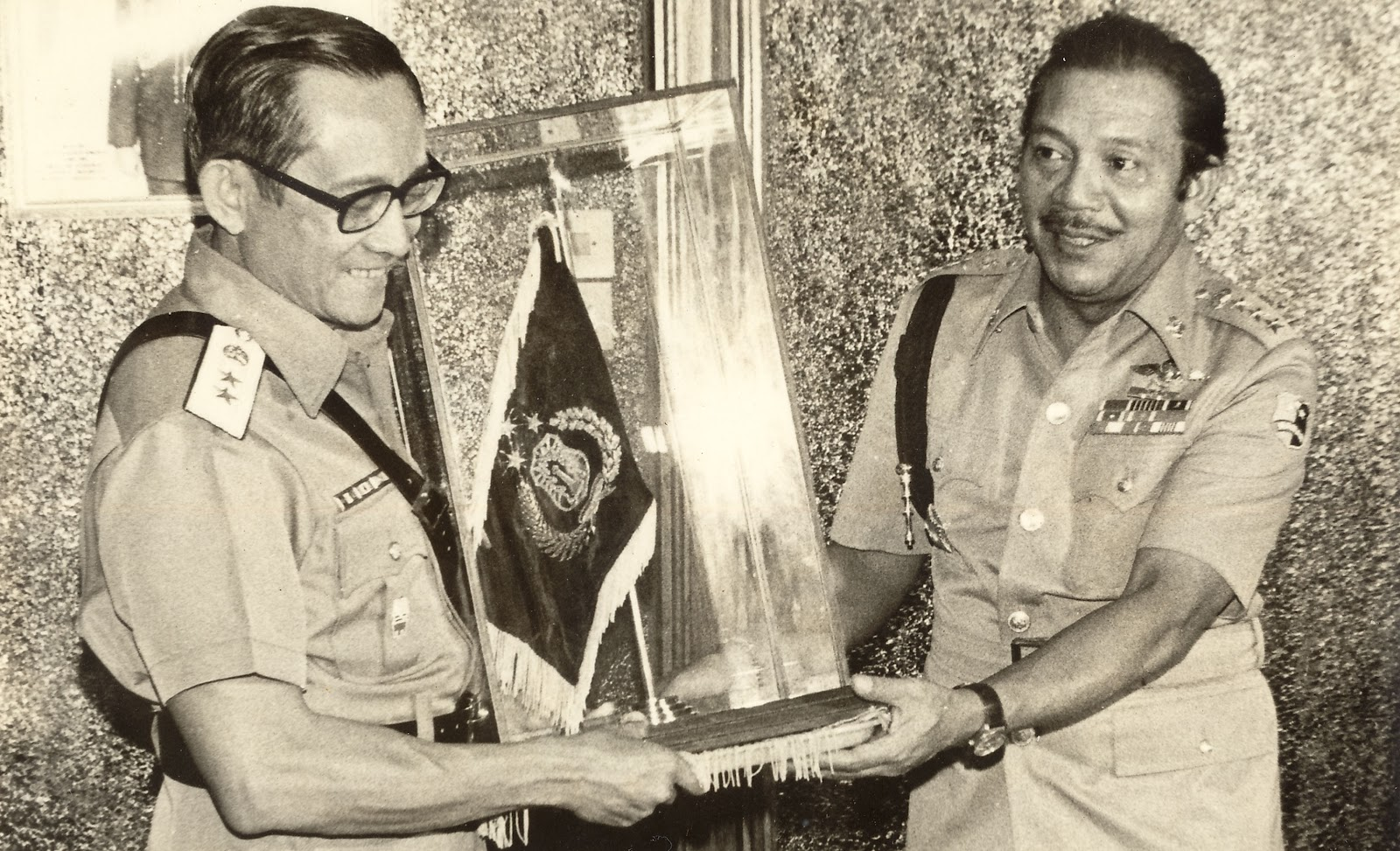
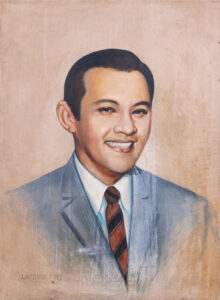
Members of the "Rolex 12."

Rolex 12 is the collective name of twelve of the closest and most powerful advisers of President Ferdinand Marcos during the martial law years in the Philippines from 1972 to 1981.

== History ==
During the latter years of his second elected term, Marcos conspired with various leaders of the military and Philippine Constabulary. The goal was for Marcos to gain full authoritarian control of the country during his declaration of martial law in 1972. Marcos gave the military leadership powers during martial law, taking over from democratically elected officials and court judges.

The twelve were responsible for many human rights atrocities, although the extent of their responsibility is still being investigated. These atrocities include torture, murder, seizures of property, displacement from homes, and arrest and detention without due process. Some of them fled with Marcos when he and his family left the Philippines in 1986, while Enrile and Ramos were instrumental in the coup against him.

=== Origin of the name ===
The origin of the name Rolex 12 came from accounts that each associate was gifted a luxury watch from Marcos himself. A widespread story and some sources state that the brand was Rolex while some contend that they received Omega watches instead. While it is true that the associates received gifts from Marcos, the brands remain unverified, and despite this confusion, the Rolex name became the most common identifier used to refer to these twelve Marcos associates.

== Members of the "Rolex 12" ==
- Tomas Diaz, PMA-Cl '51 - Vice Chief of the Philippine Constabulary
- Juan Ponce Enrile - Minister of National Defense
- Romeo Espino UP-ROTC - Chief of Staff of the Armed Forces of the Philippines (AFP)
- Romeo Gatan - Chief of the Philippine Constabulary in Rizal
- Alfredo Montoya, PMA Cl-'51 -Chief of the Philippine Constabulary Metropolitan Command (METROCOM)
- Ignacio Paz, PMA Cl-'51 - Chief of the Intelligence Services of the Armed Forces of the Philippines (ISAFP)
- Fidel Ramos, USMA Cl-'50; Honorary PMA Cl-51 - Commanding General of the Philippine Constabulary (PC), President of the Philippines (1992–1998)
- Jose Rancudo - Commanding General of the Philippine Air Force (PAF)
- Hilario Ruiz - Flag Officer in Command of the Philippine Navy (PN)
- Gen. Rafael Zagala - Commanding General of the Philippine Army (PA)
- Fabian Ver, Honorary-PMA Cl '51 - Chief of National Intelligence Security Authority (NISA)
- Eduardo "Danding" Cojuangco Jr., Honorary PMA Cl-'51 - Governor of Tarlac (1967–1969), Chairman of San Miguel Corporation (1998–2020)

Five Rolex 12 members were buried in Libingan ng mga Bayani before Marcos: Paz, Espino, Gatan, Montoya, and Zagala. Ramos followed in 2022, with Enrile following in 2025.

== See also ==
- First Quarter Storm
- Cronies of Ferdinand Marcos
- Marcos loyalism
- Stolen wealth of the Marcos family
