= Fabian Ver =

Filipino general (1920–1998)

Fabian Crisologo Ver
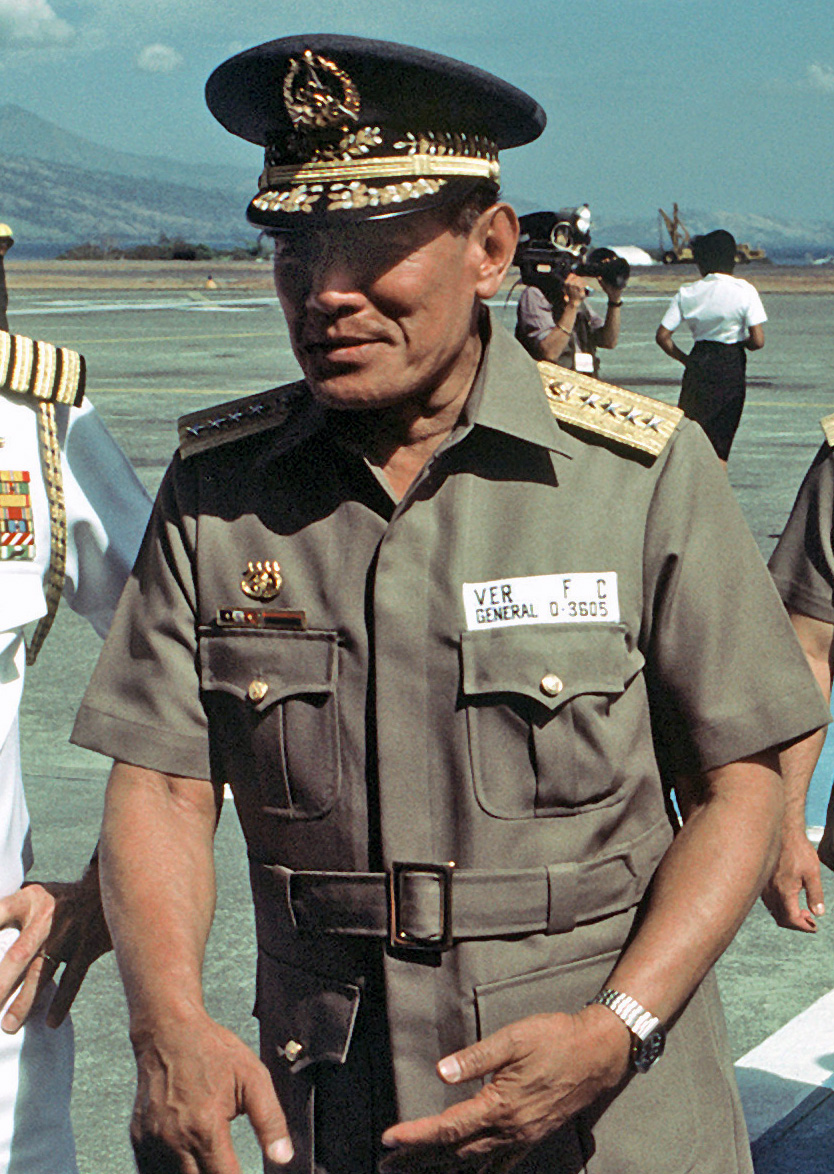
- Ver in 1982

18th Chief of the Armed Forces of the Philippines
- In office August 15, 1981 – February 25, 1986
- President: Ferdinand Marcos
- Preceded by: Romeo Espino
- Succeeded by: Fidel Ramos

Director-General of National Intelligence Security Authority
- In office August 15, 1981 – October 24, 1984
- President: Ferdinand Marcos
- Preceded by: Santiago Barangan
- Succeeded by: Vicente S. Yumul

Commander of the Presidential Security Command
- In office 1972–1986
- President: Ferdinand Marcos
- Preceded by: Rafael Zagala
- Succeeded by: Voltaire Gazmin

Personal details
- Born: Fabian Maria Trinidad Juan Cirilo Crisologo Ver; January 19, 1920 Sarrat, Ilocos Norte, Philippine Islands
- Died: November 21, 1998 (aged 78) Bangkok, Thailand
- Resting place: Sarrat, Ilocos Norte, Philippines

Military service
- Allegiance: Philippines
- Branch/service: Philippine Constabulary
- Years of service: 1940–1986
- Rank: General
- Commands: Armed Forces of the Philippines
- Battles/wars: World War II; Hukbalahap Rebellion

Fabian Crisologo Ver (born Fabian Maria Trinidad Juan Cirilo Crisologo Ver; January 19, 1920 – November 21, 1998) was a Filipino military officer who served as the Commanding Officer of the Armed Forces of the Philippines under President Ferdinand Marcos.

== Early life and education ==
Fabian Ver was born on January 19, 1920, to Juan Ver and Elena Crisologo (August 19, 1902—August 17, 2004). He grew up in the town of Sarrat in Ilocos Norte.

Ver attended the University of the Philippines and was an alumnus of its reserve program. He also joined the UP Vanguard in 1941. However, the outbreak of World War II disrupted his studies. After the war, he resumed his studies at the University of Manila where he obtained a Bachelor of Law degree and later the University of Louisville where he graduated with a degree in police administration in 1963. He also undertook training in Hawaii and with the Los Angeles Police Department.

== Military and political career ==
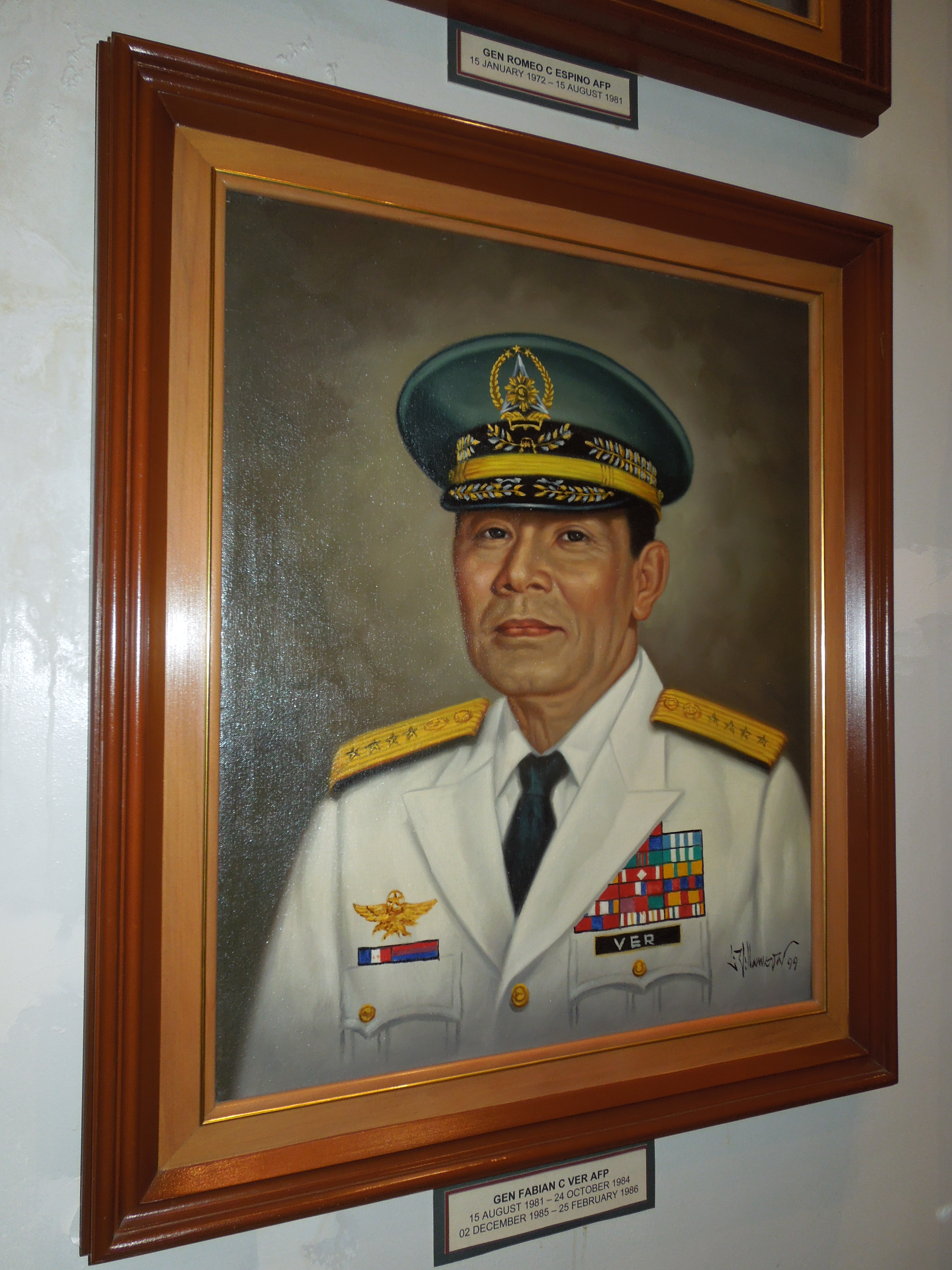
A portrait of General Fabian Ver at the AFP Museum in Camp Aguinaldo

During World War II, he acted as a guerrilla intelligence officer with the rank of third lieutenant and after the war, he went on in the military service. During Ferdinand Marcos' term as Senate President in the early 1960s, he was one of his military advisers. He was at that time serving in the Criminal Investigation Service of the Philippine Constabulary with the rank of captain.

The Philippine Constabulary, now the Philippine National Police, was at that time, a major service of the Armed Forces of the Philippines that dealt with law enforcement and peace and order in the country.

Ver was described by former Defense Minister Juan Ponce Enrile in his autobiography as a man of Marcos through and through. He could not and would not say no to Marcos and would blindly carry out the wishes and orders of Marcos without question. Thus, he became the most loyal officer to Marcos and upon the latter's election as President of the Philippines in 1965, he became part of the latter's inner circle. Ver then worked his way up through the military ranks.

Ver was the most trusted military officer of then President Ferdinand Marcos as Martial Law was declared on September 21, 1972, was also known as one of Marcos' chief enforcers, and was said to be the highest among the Rolex 12 group of people privy to the inner workings of Martial Law.

He became further fiercely loyal to Marcos, who rewarded him by appointing him as the commanding general of the Presidential Security Group, then known as the Presidential Security Command or PSC that was tasked to secure Marcos and his family. When he was due for retirement in 1976, Marcos extended his term indefinitely. He also headed the then National Intelligence and Security Authority or NISA (now the National Intelligence Coordinating Agency), the vast and well-armed and well-equipped intelligence department of the Philippines, sending government agents to search for anti-Marcos critics. It placed spies in all government and private entities. In effect, NISA acted as secret police force of the Marcos regime. And since NISA was under the direct control of the Office of the President, Ver directly reported to Marcos. And under the 1978 National Security Code, NISA also was given functional supervision and control over the Intelligence Service of the AFP or ISAFP, thus its chief also reported to Ver directly, thus widening his powers in the military gaining full suzerainty of the ISAFP to further NISA's functions. In a 1997 documentary, General Romeo Espino, former chief of staff of the AFP said Ver was a powerful man and who checked his recommendations for promotions and appointments before it reached Marcos. And, if Ver decided to release any political prisoner detained by NISA, it equalled that of Marcos as his signature was also considered as the latter's.

Martial law was lifted in 1981, and Ver was appointed Chief of Staff of the Armed Forces of the Philippines over a cousin, then Major-General Fidel Valdez Ramos, the chief of the Philippine Constabulary. Thus, Ver became the most powerful officer in the military, as he headed now three institutions: the entire AFP, the PSC and NISA. Police officials, military men, businessmen, politicians, bureaucrats and other prominent figures kowtowed to him.

Ver was well-feared due to his direct access to Marcos as well as then First Lady Imelda Marcos. In fact, his three sons, who followed his footsteps also saw stellar careers. His eldest son, Irwin was rapidly promoted to colonel and named chief of staff of the Presidential Security Command. His other son, Rexor was the chief of the close- in security of Marcos and his youngest son, Wyrlo, was the commander of the Armored Unit of Malacanang Palace. Irwin Ver graduated no. 1 in the Philippine Military Academy in 1970. During Ver's term as AFP chief of staff, he was biased in favor of the military officers that came from ROTC program by giving them incentives and named them to key important posts in the military, thus, this made the military officers who graduated from the Philippine Military Academy resentful, with some officers forming a faction called Reform the Armed Forces Movement led by Col. Gregorio Honasan, Victor Batac, & Eduardo "Red" Kapunan who all graduated in the academy in 1971. He also extended schooling privileges to his relatives, friends in the military especially the graduates of professional military schools that were close to him, to the Marcoses, including those who paid homage to him and filled the high posts in the military with Ilocano ROTC-trained military officers. This led to the era of favoritism and Ilocanization in the AFP. General Romeo Espino, Ver's predecessor, was AFP Chief of Staff for the longest term in the Philippines military, was like Ver, Espino was also an ROTC graduate in the University of the Philippines, but was regarded as fair in administration of military affairs during his time, unlike Ver.

Ver also instituted, along with Marcos, the extension of services in the military of those military officers loyal to them, who overreached their retirement age.

As Marcos disregarded the authority of then Defense Minister Juan Ponce Enrile in the 1980s, he changed the military chain of command. Under the new chain of command, the authority would evolve from Marcos as president and commander-in-chief of the armed forces up to Ver, the chief of staff of the armed forces.

As such, Ver replaced Enrile as the second most-powerful high government official in the country, the status which the latter held during martial law when he was tasked to administer it.

== Aquino assassination and acquittal by Marcos ==
Ver kept aging officers loyal to himself and also to Marcos on the armed forces, thus making young officers disgruntled. The Reform the Armed Forces Movement (RAM) was formed by these young officers, led by then Colonel Gregorio Honasan and then Captain Proceso Maligalig as a result of this. The RAMboys, as they were known in the Philippines, played a key role in Marcos' overthrow. As the Marcos regime grew unpopular during these years, Marcos would be in and out of office due to kidney ailments. Political mismanagement ensued, culminating with the 1983 assassination of popular opposition leader and senator Benigno Aquino Jr. upon his return from exile in the United States. The Agrava Commission, an independent fact-finding body put up by Marcos, found evidence to verify that the military and Ver were involved, but he was subsequently acquitted in 1985 by the Sandiganbayan. After the tumultuous snap election on February 7, 1986, Marcos announced that he was replacing Ver with Fidel Ramos due to his alleged ties with Ninoy Aquino's assassination, although he tacitly kept Ver in power.

== Awards in military service ==
- Philippine Republic Presidential Unit Citation
- Martial Law Unit Citation
- Presidential Medal of Merit
- Distinguished Conduct Star Medals
- Distinguished Service Star Medals
- Gold Cross Medals
- Military Merit Medals
- Military Commendation Medals
- Philippine Defense Medal
- Philippine Liberation Medal
- Anti-dissidence Campaign Medal
- Luzon Anti-Dissidence Campaign Medal
- Mindanao Anti-Dissidence Campaign Medal
- Disaster Relief and Rehabilitation Operations Ribbon
- Asiatic–Pacific Campaign Medal
- World War II Victory Medal
- PAF Gold Wings Badge

== Later life and death ==
After the tumultuous snap elections of 1986, the First EDSA Revolution broke out. During a television conference, Ver insistently advised Marcos to give him orders to fire on the swelling number of protesters, but Marcos refused to and gave the order to disperse the crowd without shooting.

Following the Revolution, Ver and his family along with the Marcoses were exiled to Hawaii. Facing federal racketeering charges, Ver left the United States using a Paraguayan passport, and transited to Austria, then finally to Mannheim, Germany where he joined his younger children. He was not allowed to return to the country during the administration of Presidents Corazon Aquino and Fidel V. Ramos. He returned during the presidency of Joseph Estrada but faced lawsuits that linked him to the assassination of Ninoy Aquino and fall guy Rolando Galman.

On November 21, 1998, Ver died of pulmonary complications in a hospital in Bangkok, Thailand, two months before his 79th birthday. His remains was returned to be entombed at the cemetery in Sarrat, Ilocos Norte.

== In popular culture ==
Ver was played by Mervyn Samson in the 1988 television film A Dangerous Life and by Robin Padilla in the 2022 movie Maid in Malacañang.

== See also ==
- Rolex 12
- Presidential Security Group / Presidential Security Command
- National Intelligence Coordinating Agency (NICA)
- Sterling Seagrave
- University of the Philippines ROTC Unit
