= Corazon Agrava =

Filipino judge (1915–1997)

The Honourable Corazon Juliano-Agrava

Chairperson of the Agrava Fact-Finding Board
- In office October 1983 – October 1984
- Appointed by: Ferdinand Marcos
- Preceded by: Post established
- Succeeded by: Post abolished

Personal details
- Born: Corazon Buenaventura Juliano; August 7, 1915 Manila
- Died: October 1, 1997 (aged 82) Quezon City
- Spouse: 1
- Parents: Francisco Juliano; Cenona Buenaventura
- Occupation: Judge, lawyer
- Known for: Chairperson, Agrava Commission
- Nickname: Rosy

Corazon Juliano-Agrava (7 August 1915 – 1 October 1997) was a Filipino judge and the second woman in 1954 appointed as judge of a Court of First Instance. She was then president of the Court for Youth and Home Affairs in Manila. Records also show that she has served as a Court of Appeals Justice. Agrava gained worldwide fame when in 1984, she was appointed the chairperson of a fact-finding board commission by President Ferdinand Marcos to investigate the cause of the murder of opposition leader Benigno Aquino Jr. in 1983. She has also been active in various other social and cultural organizations, including the Women Rights Movement of the Philippines, the Philippine Association of University Women, the National Civic Assembly of Women and U.P. Alumni Association.

== Investigation on Benigno Aquino Jr.'s assassination ==
Agrava Board

In October 1983, President Ferdinand Marcos signed the Presidential decree no. 1886, known as the "Agrava Fact-Finding Board" to investigate the assassination of opposition senator Benigno Aquino Jr. Marcos appointed Agrava to be the chairperson of the board, members are Luciano Salazar, Dante Santos, Ernesto Herrera, Amado Dizon, and legal counsel Andres Narvasa. After almost a year, the board submitted two reports to Marcos; a minority report submitted by Agrava herself, and a majority report submitted by the members. Agrava's report cleared General Fabian Ver while the majority report indicted Ver, General Luther Custodio and General Prospero Olivas.

She even used to scold the soldiers on the witness stand, as if they were her children. Also, she once led the board to sing "Happy Birthday" for First Lady Imelda Marcos twice, because Marcos was the first one to be called to testify before the investigative commission on her birthday.

In October 1984, after a year of investigation, she was called out of retirement. Lupino Lazaro, the lawyer of the family of scapegoat Rolando Galman said, "I felt since the very beginning that Justice Agrava did not have the makings of someone who would go all out. She has failed the people, and failed miserably at that." Agrava, who was in tears and choking voice addressed the crowd saying,

"You who are booing, I can in all conscience state that what I placed in my report is what I believe in ... You can even slander me. I couldn't care. If my best is not good enough for you, just because I didn't conform with your own prejudgment of the case, then I'm just sorry for you."

— Agrava said on Tuesday, October 23, 1984.

== Personal life ==
Born on August 7, 1915, by Cenona Buenaventura and Francisco Juliano. Agrava became an attorney after placing second and passed the 1938 bar exam. She became judge of Juvenile and Domestic Relations Court until 1977 when Marcos uplifted her as Associate Justice at the Court of Appeals of the Philippines.

She was married to Federico Agrava, a lawyer, but childless. But she became the "unofficial guardian" of hundreds of so-called Filipino 'street kids'.

=== Organizations ===
In 1947, she founded the UP Women Lawyer's Circle (WILOCI) at the request of Former President Manuel Roxas.

Agrava was one of the women who incorporated and registered the FIDA Philippine Branch based on the FIDA which was a group of women lawyers, together with Josefina Phodaca-Ambrosio, Pacita de los Reyes-Philips, Ameurfina Melencio-Herrera, Agustina Rosette-Navarro, Carolina Basa-Salazar, Medina Lacson-de Leon, Milagros German, Remedios Nufable-Gatmaitan, Lumen R. Policarpio, Pilar Perez-Nable, Lilia de Jesus-Sevilla. Magdalena Lapus-Lazaro, Gregoria Cruz-Arnaldo and Remedios Mijares-Austria.

=== Charitable work ===
In 1969, Agrava founded the Tahanan Outreach Projects and Services Inc. (TOPS), a social service organization that delivers learning and childcare projects for the welfare of underprivilege children. The program created a shelter for children as well.

=== Death ===
Agrava died on October 1, 1997, at the age of 82 in Quezon City, from heart failure.

== See also ==
- Assassination of Benigno Aquino Jr.
