= Rolando Galman =

Filipino criminal

Rolando "Rolly" Galman (April 16, 1950 – August 21, 1983) was a Filipino farmer. On August 21, 1983, within minutes after the assassination of Ninoy Aquino, Galman was shot and killed meters from Aquino's body at the tarmac of the Manila International Airport.

Galman was an alleged member of the New People's Army and a gang and one of the alleged killers of Ninoy Aquino. His mother described him as an "obedient boy" with "nothing wrong." In the 1960s, he became a builder of wells, eventually moving to Zaragoza again. He moved to San Miguel, Bulacan in 1979. His criminal records allegedly show that he was charged for multiple crimes and arrested on February 17, 1982, but he was released on February 7, 1983. Another warrant for his arrest was issued on April 26, but he was not arrested. He allegedly turned into a criminal due to poverty, but other sources said that it was due to his father's murder. According to intelligence files, he was allegedly part of a criminal group related to the New People's Army, with a purported NPA member stating that an NPA guerrilla commander and the alleged handpicked assassin of Aquino. His children said otherwise. A resident of San Isidro, Nueva Ecija, said that Galman was part of a government-protected gang.

After Galman's murder, his girlfriend and her sister were kidnapped on September 4, 1983, while Galman's wife Lina Lazaro disappeared in Bulacan on January 29, 1984. A film based on his life titled Anak Ko... Lando was produced in 1985, but its theatrical exhibition was halted by the censors board the night before its release.

== Early life ==
According to a file submitted by a criminal investigation service, Rolando Galman was born on April 16, 1950, in Zaragoza, Nueva Ecija, to Julian Galman and Saturnina Dawang, as the eldest of nine children. Galman and his family were part of the Philippine Independent Church. According to Saturnina, his mother, Rolando was an obedient boy who would wait in long queues to receive rice during a shortage. He studied in Aliaga for Grade 1, Baguio for Grades 2 and 3, and Santo Tomas, Aliaga, for Grades 4 and 5. At 10 years old, he helped in his family's farm by day and caught catfish and frogs at night. In Grade 2, he gained third honors in his class. Due to his family's income, he had to quit school at grade 5 to help his family. as his father's income was insufficient to meet his family's needs. According to his mother, there was "nothing wrong" with Galman to make him a "toughie," which is what others say he was.

== Further life and criminal records ==
Eventually, in the 1960s, he earned a job as a builder of artesian wells in different barrios. Years later, he and his family moved to Zaragoza to work as tenants on the farm of his uncle. In 1979, he and his family moved to San Miguel, Bulacan. Instead of a house built with straw and wood, his house was built with concrete, a rarity in the area.

Galman's criminal records show that he was allegedly charged with illegal possession of firearms, double murder, attempted murder, highway robbery, robbery in band, kidnapping, and carnapping. He was purportedly arrested on February 17, 1982, in San Manuel, Pangasinan, for illegal possession of firearms. Due to his notoriety as an alleged criminal, a Presidential Commitment Order was charged against him. On December 16, Galman's common-law wife told police to lift the order, as it did not match the crimes he was charged with. With the help of Jose Espino, a lawyer from Cabanatuan, the order was lifted on January 23, 1983, causing Galman's release on February 7. His criminal career allegedly resumed as Galman "committed highway robbery at Santa Rosa, Nueva Ecija. Even though a warrant for his arrest was issued on April 26, he was not arrested. According to the criminal investigation service file, poverty caused him to become an alleged criminal. Other rumors speculate that due to his father's murder, he started becoming a criminal; his mother rejected those rumors.

Intelligence files allegedly link Galman to a criminal group related to the New People's Army operating in Pangasinan, Nueva Vizcaya, and Metro Manila led by Feliciano de la Cruz, a rebel wanted by police. With the alias "Bert Ramos," he was allegedly granted permission by the NPA to do robberies if he gave the NPA part of the loot. Rosendo Cawigan testified that Galman was actually an NPA guerrilla commander and the alleged handpicked assassin of Aquino by the Communist Party of the Philippines. Galman's children contradict the statement, stating that it was "hard to believe" that their father was a communist, as he has had relations with military commanders; a Philippine Air Force Colonel, Col. Custodio, arrived at their home to celebrate Galman's birthday. Lawyer Espino also supported this claim, stating that it was Galman's non-affiliation in the Communist rebellion that could have let him be released. When he was working on Galman's release, Espino brought the colonel to Galman during his imprisonment in Camp Olivas, and by the way they were interacting, Espino assumed they were long-time friends. Col. Custodio said otherwise, stating that "they [were] lying" and threatened to sue Espino for libel. He admitted that he met Galman three times but only considered him an "acquaintance".

One of his alleged mates when Galman was purportedly a part of the NPA was Mario Mana, the barangay captain of Alua, San Isidro, Nueva Ecija. Allegedly, Mana was imprisoned in Camp Olivas at the same time as Galman but was released early and, according to Espino, must have referred his legal services to Galman. Mana said he did not know Galman, but a town resident testified privately that both Mana and Galman were allegedly gangmates in a gang that was protected by the province's government officials. A town mayor of Nueva Ecija also testified that both were bodyguards for Galman's alleged associate, Hermilo Gosuico, when he planned to run for mayor in 1980. A resident of San Miguel, Bulacan, said that Galman had "forced himself on her".

== Assassination of Ninoy Aquino ==
=== Background ===
Col. Custodio said that Galman went to his house at 10 p.m. looking anxious, talking about a mission brought to him by "a group." He then refused to say more. According to Galman's stepdaughter Roberta, Gosuico and four men picked up Galman at 7 p.m. on August 17, four days before the assassination, serving as the last time Roberta saw her stepfather. Gosuico said he did not know Galman and rejected their testimony. According to Eutiquio Daraman, a costume designer whom Galman allegedly loved, he recounted his last memorable "date" with Galman. Allegedly, in the date at Shakey's Pizza Malate two days before the assassination, he wanted to unburden himself and told Daraman of his assassination plans. Allegedly, former Senator Salvador Laurel gave him the travel plans of Aquino and the information that Aquino was wearing a bulletproof vest. He was also allegedly told that the weapon would be supplied by a person "from the opposition." Allegedly, Galman picked up his other love, Anna Oliva, who was a receptionist, and they stayed at a hospital near the airport. According to Oliva, the last time she was with Galman, she noticed that he was restless. When Oliva allegedly asked him if anything was wrong, Galman purportedly replied, "Mabigat ito. Hindi mo kaya ito. Pero, huwag kang mag-alala, huling misyon ko na ito." (transl. This is a big job. This is beyond you. But don't you worry, this will be my last mission.) They stayed at the hotel until the morning of August 21.

After being charged with murder, illegal possession of firearms, and subversion, Ninoy Aquino was sentenced to death in 1977. However, the execution never happened. Three years later, then-President Ferdinand Marcos allowed him to go to the United States for surgery after experiencing a heart attack. They then settled in Boston after his operation in Texas. Not wanting to stay in the United States for long, he stopped by multiple countries, like Singapore and Taiwan using the name "Marcial Bonifacio" before boarding China Airlines Flight 811 directed to Manila.

=== Assassination and death ===
At 1:05 p.m. on August 21, 1983, the airplane carrying Ninoy Aquino arrived at the Manila International Airport. As he was leaving the plane, he was wearing a bulletproof vest that did not cover his head. Soldiers escorted him from his seat to a military vehicle planned to take him to Fort Bonifacio. Many opposition leaders and fans waited for him, cheering when Aquino left the plane. According to Jose Orias, a Philippine Airlines load controller standing in the cockpit of a plane, he saw Aquino coming down the stairs. Three to four steps away from the last rung, Galman allegedly darted, extending his hand to Aquino like "delivering a fist blow." Aquino then fell forward, and more shots followed. Afterwards, orders to shoot Galman were carried out by soldiers at the scene. Galman eventually died.

== Aftermath ==
A day after the assassination of Aquino, police released a photograph of Rolando, as he was not identified. The name "Rolly" was written on his briefs, and his pockets contained loose change. Eventually, he was identified as Rolando Galman. As people related to him started disappearing and alleged associates denied having relations with Rolando, writer Jose Nolasco described his life as "shrouded in mystery." He was described by some witnesses as "shady". Many witness statements from soldiers who saw the assassination stated that Galman was the person who killed Aquino; Col. Ager Ontog, the Chief of Operations of AVSECOM, said that killing Galman was an "overreaction." The first non-military testification was Orias, who stated that there was a possibility the killer was not Galman.

On September 4, 1983, Galman's girlfriend Ana Oliva and her sister Catherine were working as "hospitality girls" at the Super Club in Malabon when they were kidnapped by armed men in a brown Toyota.

On November 11, 1983, Galman's funeral was held in Manila. During the funeral, his 10-year-old son Reynaldo was photographed making the Laban sign with his hand.

According to Roberta, Galman's wife Lina Lazaro was kidnapped by two men at noontime in their hometown of San Miguel, Bulacan on January 29, 1984, one of whom she identified as Hermilo Gosuico. Roberta and Reynaldo, her half-brother, did not hear from their mother since then.

A biographical film about Galman titled Anak Ko... Lando (lit. 'My child... Lando') was produced in 1985, but its theatrical exhibition was halted by the Board of Review for Motion Pictures, Television and Live Entertainment on July 31, the night before its release in Metro Manila theaters.

In the first trial on December 2, 1985, the Sandiganbayan charged Galman guilty of killing Aquino. After the People Power Revolution made Corazon Aquino president, a retrial was ordered. On September 27, 1990, Galman was cleared, with Rogelio Moreno, one of Aquino's escorts, declared guilty.

== Personal life ==
According to residents of San Miguel, Bulacan, Galman was a generous man; many asked him for money and medicines. A resident said "Of course we wondered where he got the money, but [...] all that mattered was that he was generous to us." Many people visited him in cars, making residents curious, since the area had barely any paved roads.
