= Ernesto Herrera (politician) =

Filipino politician (1942–2015)

The Honorable Ernesto F. Herrera
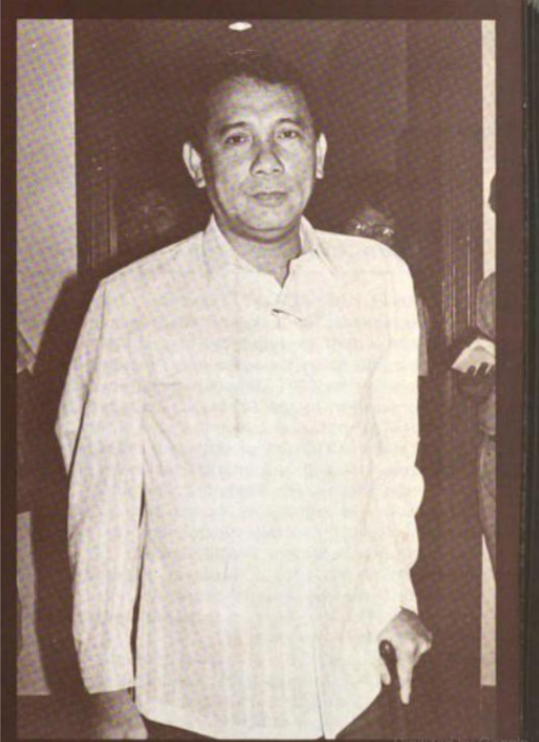
- Herrera as a senator, photograph released by the Philippine Congress, c. 1988

Senate of the Philippines
- In office June 30, 1987 – June 30, 1998

Member of the Philippine House of Representatives from Bohol's 1st district
- In office June 30, 1998 – June 30, 2001
- Preceded by: Venice Borja-Agana
- Succeeded by: Edgar M. Chatto

Member of the Agrava Fact-Finding Board
- In office October 1983 – October 1984 Serving with Corazon Juliano-Agrava (chairperson), Amado Dizon, Luciano Salazar, and Dante Santos
- Appointed by: Ferdinand Marcos

Personal details
- Born: September 11, 1942 Samboan, Cebu, Commonwealth of the Philippines
- Died: October 29, 2015 (aged 73) Ermita, Manila, Philippines
- Party: LDP (1992–1998, 2004–2015)
- Other political affiliations: Lakas-CMD (2001–2004); LAMMP (1998-2001); Liberal (1987–1992)
- Spouse: Lourdes Cuico-Herrera
- Children: Maria Luzil; June Francis; Ernesto II; Ernesto III
- Education: University of the Visayas (LLB); Lyceum of the Philippines University (MPA, PhD)
- Occupation: Politician
- Profession: Businessman

Ernesto "Boy" Falar Herrera (September 11, 1942 – October 29, 2015) was a Senator of the Philippines and congressman for Bohol's 1st district. He was a trade union leader, an advocate of law and order, and a legislator in the 8th, 9th, 10th and 11th Congresses.

== Career ==
As senator, Herrera is the principal author of the law that reinstated capital punishment in the Philippines on December 31, 1993. It would later be abolished on June 24, 2006 upon the implementation of Republic Act No. 9346.

== Personal life ==
Herrera was born in Samboan, Cebu, on September 11, 1942. He was married to entrepreneur, Lourdes Betia Cuico. He died at the Manila Doctors Hospital in Manila on October 29, 2015, at the age of 73, and a month before his 74th birthday.

== Educational life ==
- Zapatera Elementary School (1955)
- University of the Visayas (1959)
- University of the Visayas – Bachelor of Laws (1965)

=== Higher studies ===
- Lyceum of the Philippines – Master's in Public Administration (1995)
- Lyceum of the Philippines – Doctor of Fiscal Studies (1998)

== General history ==
- Trade Union Congress of the Philippines – General secretary (1983–2015)
- Senator – Philippine Senate (1987–1998)
- Congressman – Philippine House of Representatives (1998–2001)

== Affiliations ==
- International Labor Organization – Former consultant
- Citizen's Drugwatch Foundation Inc. – Founding chairman
- Carlos P. Garcia Foundation Inc. – President
- Agrava Fact-Finding Board (investigated the assassination of Benigno Aquino Jr.) – Member
- International Confederation of Free Trade Union – Former member, executive board
- University of the Visayas Alumni Association – President
- Forefront Technologies Foundation Inc. – Co-founder

== See also ==
- 8th Congress of the Philippines
- 9th Congress of the Philippines
- 10th Congress of the Philippines
- 11th Congress of the Philippines
- 2001 Philippine general election
