= Nuisance candidate =

Philippines election candidate not accepted for candidacy

In the Philippines, a nuisance candidate is an official term for an aspirant candidate for a public office whose certificate of candidacy was not accepted by the Commission on Elections (COMELEC) either motu proprio by the election body itself or upon a verified petition of an interested party.

== Legal definition ==
Section 69 of the Omnibus Election Code states that a nuisance candidate is someone who has filed a certificate of candidacy with the intention of:

1. putting the election process in mockery or disrepute
2. causing confusion among voters by the similarity of their name to other registered candidates
3. other circumstances or acts which clearly demonstrate that the candidate has no bona fide intention to run for the office for which the certificate of candidacy has been filed and is consequently preventing a faithful determination of the true will of the electorate.

The Law Department of the COMELEC in Manila has the sole authority to declare someone a nuisance candidate. Regional and provincial COMELEC offices have no jurisdiction regarding the matter.

== Managing candidacies ==
COMELEC also cannot prevent persons from filing certificates of candidacy even if they were declared a nuisance candidate in the past. The election body could also determine those who aspire to run as Independents as nuisance candidates if they could not prove their capacity to independently launch an election campaign. The capability to launch a campaign is not necessarily equate to the financial resources of an aspirant. A candidate may have enough supporters to conduct a campaign. The Supreme Court ruled in Marquez vs. COMELEC that not being financially capable to mount a nationwide campaign is not a reason for the commission to declare someone as a nuisance candidate.

During the 18th Congress, a bill has been proposed imposing a fine on aspirants who were deemed to be nuisance candidates.

=== Marquez v. Comelec ===
In the case of Norman Marquez, a Baguio-based animal welfare advocate who was not allowed by the Commission on Elections to run for senator in the 2019 and 2022 elections, he twice challenged the orders declaring him a nuisance candidate; the Supreme Court also ruled in his favor.

The court first issued a landmark ruling at a time after the elections which nullified such declaration; stated that the Comelec "committed grave abuse of discretion" in such declaration and it cannot combine an individual's intention to run with a financial capacity requirement.

In 2022, Marquez raised to the court the same declaration anew by the Comelec which cited grounds, this time for being unknown to the entire country and having no support from any political party. On September 10, the court publicized its ruling (dated June 28) partly granting Marquez's petition. The court stated that unpopularity and not being a member of a political party are insufficient grounds to such declaration in the country's elections, which "reduces the electoral process [...] to a mere popularity contest." It also stated that the matter "should not be taken against the candidate but is best left to the electorate."

=== Ollesca v. Comelec ===
In the moot case of Juan Juan Olila Ollesca, a businessperson was not allowed by the Commission on Elections to run for President as an independent aspirant in the 2022 Philippine presidential election for lack of financial capacity. He challenged the order declaring him a nuisance candidate and the Supreme Court ruled in his favor.

The court, in rendering a landmark judgment at a time after 2022 Philippine general election which nullified such declaration, ruled that the Comelec "committed grave abuse of discretion". Citing its 1965 Per curiam decision in the "social justice case of Maquera v. Borra, the High Tribunal noted that property qualifications cannot be imposed on electoral candidates.

== Notable nuisance candidates ==
The following people who filed certificates of candidacy for a public office at the national level (Senator, Vice President, President) were officially declared as nuisance candidates by COMELEC:

Key
Put the election process in mockery or disrepute.
Caused confusion among the voters by the similarity of the names of the registered candidates.
Other circumstances or acts which clearly demonstrate that the candidate has no bona fide intention to run for the office for which the certificate of candidacy has been filed and thus prevents a faithful determination of the true will of the electorate
No Information

=== For President ===
Status	Name	Year of Elections	Description	Petitioner	Ref.
Mockery	Allan Carreon	2016	Among other nuisance candidates, Allan Carreon received media attention for his claim of being able to talk with extraterrestrial life.		
Other	Rizalito David	2016	Rizalito David planned to run as president under the Kapatiran Party. However COMELEC ruled him as a nuisance candidate after Kapatiran informed the election body that it is not fielding any candidates for the 2016 national elections. COMELEC also did not find sufficient proof that he is able to finance a national campaign since he listed his occupation as a broadcaster.		
Other	Eddie Gil	2004	Eddie Gil is an aspirant president running under his own party Isang Bansa, Isang Diwa for the 2004 elections was declared a nuisance candidate after the COMELEC ruled that he has no intention to run. He promised to make all Filipinos millionaires, and to pay the national debt using his own personal wealth. Comelec cited his non-payment of hotel, transport and food bills during the first week of his campaign, issuance of bouncing cheques and conviction for falsifying public documents. The election body noted the withdrawal of his Senatorial candidates–Rodrigo Brillante, Jose Flores, Crisologo Eddie Ilarde, Pilar Pilapil and Ramon Montaño from his slate and stated that he has shown no proof that he can finance a national campaign on his own. Eddie Villanueva, petitioner and presidential aspirant suspected the camp of then President Gloria Macapagal Arroyo for convincing Gil to run to confuse the public to derail Villanueva's campaign but Arroyo's spokesperson Michael Defensor cited Gil's disqualification to disprove Villanueva's claim.	Eddie Villanueva	
Other	Elly Pamatong	2016	Pamatong said that he was disqualified through the invoking of a repealed provision of the SOCE (statement of contributions and expenses) law.		
Other	Elly Pamatong	2004	Was disqualified with 35 others for being deemed incapable of mounting a national campaign. Pamatong disputed this conclusion.		
Other	Pascual Racuyal	1986	Disqualified after running in every presidential election since 1935		

=== For Senator ===
Status	Name	Year of Elections	Description	Petitioner	Ref.
Confusion	Theodore Aquino	2007	Representative Benigno Aquino III filed a disqualification petition against his distant cousin on the grounds of being a dual citizen.	Benigno III Aquino	
Confusion	Joselito Pepito Cayetano	2007	Senator Alan Peter Cayetano who alleges that the camp of then President Gloria Macapagal Arroyo convinced Joselito Cayetano to file for a Senate candidacy in a bid to confuse voters.	Alan Peter Cayetano	
Confusion	Melchor Chavez	2004	According to Francisco Chavez, Melchor Chavez ran to derail the former's Senatorial bid.	Francisco Chavez	
No information	Daniel Ronquillo Magtira	2025	Self-proclaimed husband of actress Kris Aquino in 2021 and a suitor of Imee Marcos in 2024. He pledged to increase salary increase if elected.		
Motion for consideration filed	Francis Leo Marcos	2025	Also known as Francis Mangusin, a social media personality.		

=== Successfully challenged petitions ===
Name	Year of Elections	Candidacy for	Description	Petitioner	Ref.
Eddie Gil	2001	Senator	Gil was declared a nuisance candidate but was later allowed to run.		
Francis Leo Marcos	2022	Senator	Also known as Francis Mangusin, the social media personality was allowed to run on account that he is able to run a credible campaign due to his online popularity.		

== See also ==
- Novelty candidate
- Non-human electoral candidates
- List of frivolous political parties
