= Panfilo Lacson 2010 presidential campaign =

- Campaign: 2010 Philippine presidential election
- Candidate: Panfilo Lacson; Senator of the Philippines (2001–2013; 2016–2022); Presidential Assistant on Rehabilitation and Recovery (2013–2015); Chief of the Philippine National Police (1999–2001)
- Affiliation: Independent

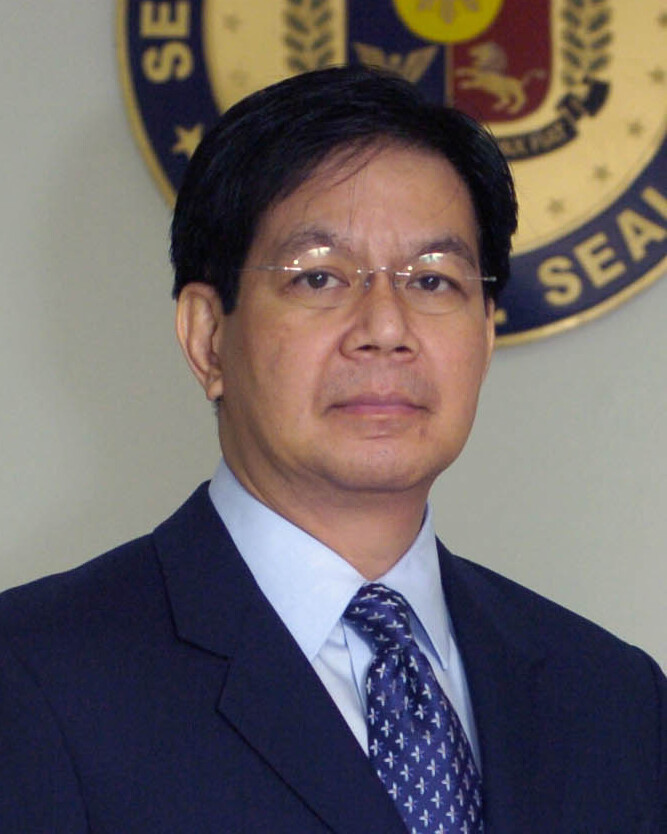
Panfilo Lacson

The 2010 presidential campaign of Panfilo Lacson was launched by stating on May 12, 2009, that he will run for president. That time, Lacson is only in the half of his second term as a Senator, and six years ago, he ran for president.

== Pre-campaign ==
After losing in 2004 presidential battle, Lacson ran for Senate in 2007, and clinched a seat. On March 22, 2009, Lacson stated that he was willing to give up presidential ambition, but also that time, he was open to talk with the opposition.

== Campaign ==
On May 12, 2009, he declared his presidential campaign. While in the middle of his campaign, Lacson stated that he stated that even the party mergers happen (including the merger of Lakas-CMD and Kampi), he still continue his campaign.

On June 6, 2009, he withdrawn from his campaign. After the withdrawal, rumors speculated that he withdraw due to a deal with the administration with the accusations on Dacer-Corbito case. But both camps denied the rumors.

== Aftermath ==
Lacson made another bid for president in 2022, but lost.

== See also ==
- Panfilo Lacson 2004 presidential campaign
- Panfilo Lacson 2022 presidential campaign
