= Panfilo Lacson 2004 presidential campaign =

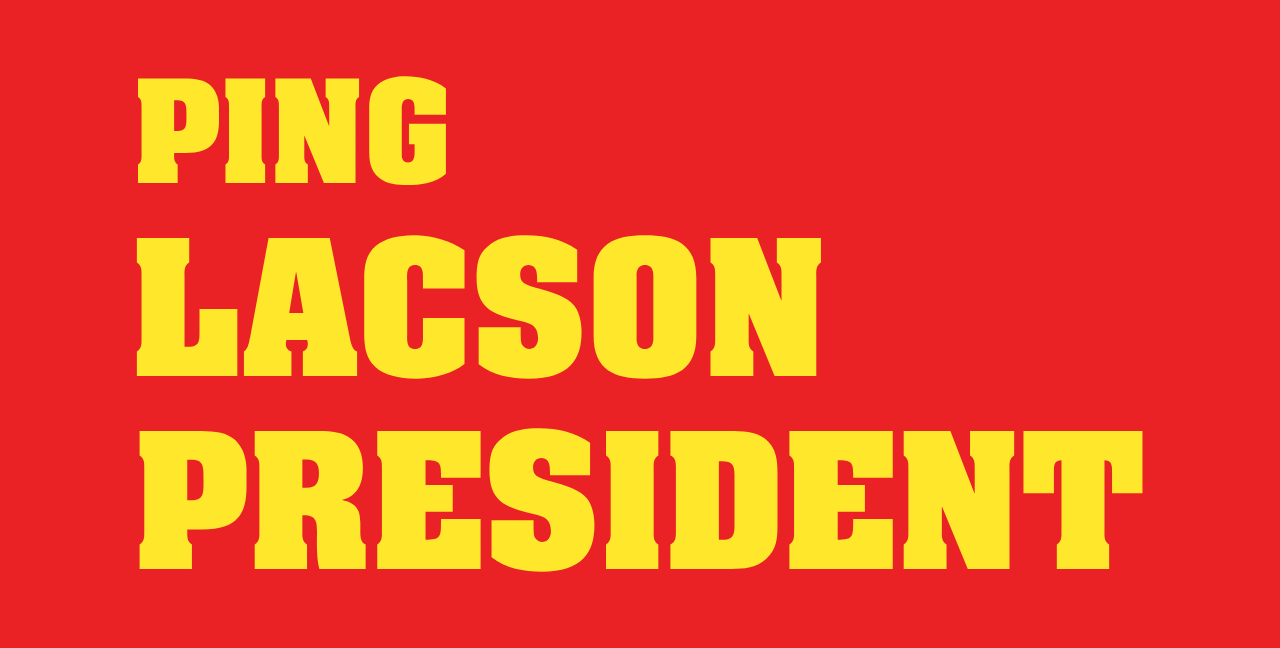
- Campaign: 2004 Philippine presidential election
- Candidate: Panfilo Lacson; Senator of the Philippines; (2001–2013; 2016–2022); Chief of the Philippine National Police; (1999–2001)
- Affiliation: Laban ng Demokratikong Pilipino (Aquino Wing)
- Status: Official launch: December 29, 2003; Lost election counting: May 24, 2004
- Key people: Lito Banayo (political strategist, spokesman)
- Slogans: Si Ping ang Pangulo; Huwag Matakot, Fight Kurakot; Ang Mali Labanan! Ang Tama, Ipaglaban; Buo ang Loob, Walang Takot; Labanan ang K4: Kahirapan, Krimen, Katiwalian, Kurakot

The 2004 presidential campaign of Panfilo Lacson was launched when he filed his certificate of candidacy on December 29, 2003. That time, Lacson is only in the half of his first term as a Senator, and three years ago, he is the former chief of the Philippine National Police.

This is his first try to run as president.

== Background ==
Lacson won a senate seat in 2001, and that time he was rumored to run as president in the near future.

That time, he was only supported by some congressmen like Butz Aquino, Ronaldo Zamora, and Carlos Padilla, while he gathered the support of his former commanding officers, PMA upper classmen and classmates.

Being known for being a military and police officer, Lacson offers a style governance that focuses on crime-fighting.

== Lacson vs Poe: Divided opposition ==
=== Issue with the other Faction ===
Angara faction (who supports Fernando Poe Jr.'s presidential run), said Lacson could be disqualified from the presidential race for allegedly "misrepresenting" himself as the party standard-bearer. They also said that his candidacy only boosted the election for full-term of then-incumbent President Gloria Macapagal Arroyo, as they consider it to divide the votes for the opposition. If Poe run as president, Lacson will not slide down as his vice presidential candidate.

This issue of opposition split made the Iglesia Ni Cristo (INC) and El Shaddai endorse the incumbent Gloria Macapagal Arroyo. INC was rumored of endorsing him at first.

=== Split of LDP ===
By then, Poe and Lacson have both filed their certificates of candidacies for president. According to the rules of candidacy, every presidential candidate must have a political party to back him or her. With the obvious split within the ranks of the LDP, and with no signs that the two factions would come to an agreement, the COMELEC decided to informally split the party into the Aquino and the Angara wings. Lacson then ran under the LDP - Aquino Wing, and Poe under the LDP - Angara Wing, which would later become the KNP.

Before and during the campaign period, there had been numerous unification talks between the two factions. The opposition saw the need to become united under one banner to boost their chances of winning the presidential election against the organized political machinery of Arroyo. The plans of unification did not materialize due to the stubbornness of both Poe and Lacson. Lacson wanted Poe to concede to him and run as his vice-presidential candidate while the supporters of Poe wanted Lacson to back out from his candidacy and instead support Poe, citing his low performance in the surveys.

Angara brought the issue into the Supreme Court, and Lacson decided to resign in the party.

=== Unification talks ===
Lacson and Poe wanted to be unified by many opposition members by April, but no talks happened. Also, former President Fidel Ramos, who is a former military officer and Arroyo's party founder stated that Poe should the one to slide down, and some former Lakas members like Lacson's Senate colleague Frank Drilon believed that Poe is the one who have been better match with Arroyo.

Also, Iglesia ni Cristo urged unification talks between Lacson and Poe to strengthen the opposition against the incumbent Arroyo. After the unification attempts failed, Iglesia supported the incumbent one.

== Harassment ==
Lacson's 2004 campaign received harassment from the administration candidate, such as tearing down their posters.

== Result ==
After he resign on LDP, and continued campaigning as an independent candidate in the elections. He finished third with 10.88% of the vote, behind the incumbent Arroyo and Poe. He did not concede formally, but only concede by province. He was offered allegedly by some administration officers, but he insisted to decline it.

== Endorsements ==
Panfilo Lacson

Philippine Congress

- Agapito "Butz" Aquino, Former Senator and Congressman of Makati's 2nd district (1998–2007);
- Ronaldo Zamora, Congressman of San Juan Lone district
- Carlos "Caloy" Padilla, former House Minority Leader (2001–2004) and Congressman of Nueva Vizcaya Lone district (1987–1992; 1995–2004; 2007–2016)
- Gilbert Remulla, Congressman of Cavite's 2nd district (2001–2007), journalist
- Rolex T. Suplico, Congressman of Iloilo's 5th's district (1998–2007)

Military officials

- Gen. Rodolfo Canieso (PMA Class ’56), former Army chief
- Gen. Raul Urgello (PMA Class ’66), former Army chief
- Gen. Recaredo Sarmiento II (PMA Class ’66), former PNP chief
- Gen. Cesar Nazareno (PMA Class ’56), first PNP Chief and Last PC chief
- Gen. Fidel Singson (PMA Class ’57), former commander of Intelligence Service, AFP
- Gen. Alfredo Montoya (PMA Class ’51), former MetroCom commander
- P/Dir. Everlino Nartatez (PMA Class ’65)
- P/CSupt. Romeo Acop (PMA Class ’70), a former police officer and former colleague

Twenty-four classmates of Lacson who are now retired also signed the manifesto. They include:

- Jaime de la Cruz (PNP),
- Danilo Francia (Air Force),
- Jaime Canatoy (Air Force),
- Rodolfo Vasquez (Army),
- Renato Paredes (PNP),
- Marcelino Malajacan (Army), and
- Jose Yarisantos (Air Force)

== See also ==
- 2004 Philippine general election
  - Fernando Poe Jr. 2004 presidential campaign
  - Gloria Macapagal Arroyo 2004 presidential campaign
  - Raul Roco 2004 presidential campaign
- Panfilo Lacson 2010 presidential campaign
- Panfilo Lacson 2022 presidential campaign
