= 2004 Philippine Senate election =

28th Philippine senatorial election

- May 10, 2004

12 (of the 24) seats in the Senate 13 seats needed for a majority
Alliance	K4	KNP
Seats won	7	5
Popular vote	132,793,971	95,953,367
Percentage	52.24	37.74
Senate President before election
Franklin Drilon
Liberal
Elected Senate President
Franklin Drilon
Liberal

The 28th election of members to the Senate of the Philippines was held on Monday, May 10, 2004, to elect 12 of the 24 seats in the Senate. The major coalitions that participated are the Koalisyon ng Katapatan at Karanasan sa Kinabukasan, composed of parties that support the candidacy of President Gloria Macapagal Arroyo, and the Koalisyon ng Nagkakaisang Pilipino, composed of parties that support the candidacy of film actor Fernando Poe Jr. coalition. The Alyansa ng Pag-asa was a minor coalition made up of Aksyon Demokratiko and Partido para sa Demokratikong Reporma–Lapiang Manggagawa. K4 won seven seats, while the KNP won the remaining five contested seats.

The elections were notable for several reasons. This election first saw the implementation of the Overseas Absentee Voting Act of 2003 (see Wikisource), which enabled Filipinos in over 70 countries to vote.

== Electoral system ==
Philippine Senate elections are via pluraity block voting, with the entire country as an at-large "district". Each voter has 12 votes, and can vote for up to 12 candidates. Seats up were the seats last contested in 1998.

== Parties and coalitions ==
This election has seen strong shifts of alliances and new parties as candidates switched allegiances. The two major coalitions seen in this elections were the pro-administration K-4 and the KNP as the "united opposition".

=== Koalisyon ng Katapatan at Karanasan sa Kinabukasan (K-4) ===
The Koalisyon ng Katapatan at Karanasan sa Kinabukasan (Coalition of Honesty and Experience for the Future) was the remnant of the People Power Coalition that was formed following the ascendancy of President Gloria Macapagal-Arroyo to power. Arroyo was seeking a full term under the K4 coalition with Senator Noli de Castro, an independent, popular politician, as her running mate. The leading party in this coalition is the ruling Lakas—Christian Muslim Democrats, of which Arroyo was a member. Other parties under this coalition are Liberal Party, Nacionalista Party, Nationalist People's Coalition and People's Reform Party.

=== Koalisyon ng Nagkakaisang Pilipino (KNP) ===
The Koalisyon ng Nagkakaisang Pilipino (Coalition of United Filipinos) was the coalition of the "united opposition". Its presidential and vice-presidential candidates were Fernando Poe Jr. and Senator Loren Legarda. The leading parties of this coalition were Laban ng Demokratikong Pilipino—Angara wing, PDP–Laban, and Pwersa ng Masang Pilipino. The LDP split had been caused by stubbornness between presidentiables Poe and Senator Panfilo Lacson, especially with Poe's support from former President Joseph Estrada and former First Lady Imelda Marcos. The other major party under this coalition was Estrada's Partido ng Masang Pilipino.

=== Alyansa ng Pag-asa ===
The third major coalition running in this election is the Alyansa ng Pag-asa (Alliance of Hope), This coalition fielded Raul Roco for president and Herminio Aquino for vice-president. The three major parties supporting this coalition were Roco's Aksyon Demokratiko, former National Defense Secretary Renato de Villa's Partido para sa Demokratikong Reporma, and former Cebu Governor Lito Osmeña's Probinsya Muna Development Initiative. These three parties bolted from the People Power Coalition.

=== Bangon Pilipinas Movement (BPM) ===
Bangon Pilipinas (Rise Up, Philippines) is the political party of Bro. Eduardo Villanueva. It consisted mostly of volunteers, a majority of whom came from Villanueva's Jesus Is Lord church. Villanueva resigned from the church before submitting his candidacy in order to prevent questions on the separation of church and state.

=== Laban ng Demokratikong Pilipino (LDP) — Aquino wing ===
This coalition led by Makati Representative Butz Aquino was composed of Panfilo Lacson's supporters from LDP. They fielded Congressman Caloy Padilla as its sole senatorial candidate.

=== Partido Isang Bansa, Isang Diwa ===
This was Eddie Gil's organization. Gil was deemed a nuisance candidate and was disqualified from the presidential race. However, the party qualified for other positions.

== Candidates ==
=== Administration coalition ===
Koalisyon ng Katapatan at Karanasan sa Kinabukasan ticket
Name	Party
Robert Barbers	Lakas
Rodolfo Biazon	Liberal
Pia Cayetano	Lakas
Dick Gordon	Lakas
Parouk Hussin	Lakas
Robert Jaworski	Lakas
Lito Lapid	Lakas
Orlando Mercado	Lakas
John Henry Osmeña	NPC
Mar Roxas	Liberal
Bong Revilla	Lakas
Miriam Defensor Santiago	PRP

=== Primary opposition coalition ===
Koalisyon ng Nagkakaisang Pilipino ticket
Name	Party
Boots Anson-Roa	KNP
Didagen Dilangalen	KNP
Juan Ponce Enrile	KNP
Salvador Escudero	KNP
Jinggoy Estrada	KNP
Ernesto Herrera	KNP
Alfredo Lim	KNP
Ernesto Maceda	KNP
Jamby Madrigal	KNP
Nene Pimentel	KNP
Amina Rasul	KNP
Francisco Tatad	PMP

=== Other opposition coalition ===
Alyansa ng Pag-asa ticket
Name	Party
Francisco Chavez	Reporma
Bong Coo	Aksyon
Nicanor Gatmaytan, Jr.	Aksyon
Eduardo Nonato Joson	Aksyon
Atty Batas Mauricio	Aksyon
Jay Sonza	Aksyon
Perfecto Yasay	Aksyon

=== Minor parties and independents ===
Kilusang Bagong Lipunan ticket
Name	Party
Alvin Alvincent Almirante	KBL
Oliver Lozano	KBL
Norma Nueva	KBL

Laban ng Demokratikong Pilipino-Aquino wing ticket
Name	Party
Heherson Alvarez	Independent
Carlos Padilla	Independent

Partido Isang Bansa Isang Diwa ticket
Name	Party
Ismael Aparri	PIBID
Carmen Borja	PIBID
Pendatun Decampong	PIBID
Arturo Estuita	PIBID
El Cid Fajardo	PIBID
Ramon Montaño	PIBID
Iderlina Pagunuran	PIBID
Angel Rosario	PIBID
Matuan Usop	PIBID

Independents
Name	Party
Gerardo del Mundo	Independent
Eddie Ilarde	Independent
Pilar Pilapil	Independent

== Retiring and term limited incumbents ==
1. Tessie Aquino-Oreta (LDP), did not run in 2004, ran in 2007 and lost
2. Ramon Revilla Sr. (Lakas), term limited, retired from politics
3. Gregorio Honasan (Independent), term limited, ran in 2007 and won
4. Tito Sotto (LDP), term limited, ran in 2007 and lost, ran in 2010 and won

=== Mid-term vacancies ===
1. Rene Cayetano (Lakas), died on June 25, 2003
2. Blas Ople (LDP), appointed Secretary of Foreign Affairs on July 16, 2002, died on December 14, 2003

=== Incumbents running elsewhere ===
1. Noli de Castro (Independent), ran for vice president and won
2. Loren Legarda (KNP), ran for vice president and lost

== Results ==
The Koalisyon ng Katapatan at Karanasan sa Kinabukasan (K4) won seven seats, while the Koalisyon ng Nagkakaisang Pilipino (KNP) won five.

Incumbent KNP senator Aquilino Pimentel Jr. and K4 senator Rodolfo Biazon successfully defended their seats.

K4's Pia Cayetano, Dick Gordon, Lito Lapid, Bong Revilla, Mar Roxas and KNP's Jinggoy Estrada, Alfredo Lim and Jamby Madrigal are the neophyte senators.

Returning are K4's Miriam Defensor Santiago and KNP's Juan Ponce Enrile, who were both defeated in 2001.

K4's Robert Barbers John Henry Osmeña and Robert Jaworski both lost their seats.

The election of Noli de Castro as Vice President of the Philippines in concurrent elections means that his Senate seat will be vacant until June 30, 2007.

	1	2	3	4	5	6	7	8	9	10	11	12	13	14	15	16	17	18	19	20	21	22	23	24
Before election				‡	‡	‡	‡	‡	‡	‡	‡^	‡^	‡	‡	‡									
Election result	Not up				KNP					K4							Not up							
After election					√	*	+	+	+	+	√	+	*	*	*	*								^
Senate bloc	Minority bloc										Majority bloc													

Key:

- ‡ Seats up
- + Gained by a party from another party
- √ Held by the incumbent
- * Held by the same party with a new senator
- ^ Vacancy

=== Per candidate ===
The official results of the election were released in staggered dates with most winners in local elective positions declared within two weeks from the May 10 election date. The winners in the Senatorial and Party-list Representative elections were declared on May 24, with the exception of the 12th senator which was announced on June 3. The results of the Presidential and Vice-Presidential races were finalized by the Congress on June 20, more than a month after the elections. Out of the 43,536,028 registered voters, about 35.4 million ballots were cast giving a voter turn-out of 81.4%.

A map showing the results by illustrating the topnotcher candidate by province.

Candidate	Party or alliance		Votes	%
Mar Roxas	Koalisyon ng Katapatan at Karanasan sa Kinabukasan	Liberal Party	19,372,888	54.56
Bong Revilla	Koalisyon ng Katapatan at Karanasan sa Kinabukasan	Lakas–CMD	15,801,531	44.50
Nene Pimentel	Koalisyon ng Nagkakaisang Pilipino		13,519,998	38.07
Jamby Madrigal	Koalisyon ng Nagkakaisang Pilipino		13,253,692	37.32
Dick Gordon	Koalisyon ng Katapatan at Karanasan sa Kinabukasan	Lakas–CMD	12,707,151	35.78
Pia Cayetano	Koalisyon ng Katapatan at Karanasan sa Kinabukasan	Lakas–CMD	12,542,054	35.32
Miriam Defensor Santiago	Koalisyon ng Katapatan at Karanasan sa Kinabukasan	People's Reform Party	12,187,401	34.32
Alfredo Lim	Koalisyon ng Nagkakaisang Pilipino		11,286,428	31.78
Juan Ponce Enrile	Koalisyon ng Nagkakaisang Pilipino		11,191,162	31.52
Jinggoy Estrada	Koalisyon ng Nagkakaisang Pilipino		11,094,120	31.24
Lito Lapid	Koalisyon ng Katapatan at Karanasan sa Kinabukasan	Lakas–CMD	10,970,941	30.90
Rodolfo Biazon	Koalisyon ng Katapatan at Karanasan sa Kinabukasan	Liberal Party	10,635,270	29.95
Robert Barbers	Koalisyon ng Katapatan at Karanasan sa Kinabukasan	Lakas–CMD	10,624,585	29.92
Ernesto Maceda	Koalisyon ng Nagkakaisang Pilipino		9,944,328	28.00
John Henry Osmeña	Koalisyon ng Katapatan at Karanasan sa Kinabukasan	Independent	9,914,179	27.92
Orly Mercado	Koalisyon ng Katapatan at Karanasan sa Kinabukasan	Lakas–CMD	8,295,024	23.36
Robert Jaworski	Koalisyon ng Katapatan at Karanasan sa Kinabukasan	Lakas–CMD	6,921,425	19.49
Boots Anson-Roa	Koalisyon ng Nagkakaisang Pilipino		5,873,845	16.54
Francisco Tatad	Koalisyon ng Nagkakaisang Pilipino	Pwersa ng Masang Pilipino	5,718,740	16.10
Heherson Alvarez	Independent		4,791,085	13.49
Ernesto Herrera	Koalisyon ng Nagkakaisang Pilipino		4,612,036	12.99
Perfecto Yasay	Alyansa ng Pag-asa	Aksyon Demokratiko	4,408,808	12.42
Francisco Chavez	Alyansa ng Pag-asa	Partido ng Demokratikong Reporma–Lapiang Manggagawa	4,286,838	12.07
Carlos Padilla	Independent		3,863,693	10.88
Salvador Escudero	Koalisyon ng Nagkakaisang Pilipino		3,780,469	10.65
Amina Rasul	Koalisyon ng Nagkakaisang Pilipino		3,456,480	9.73
Jay Sonza	Alyansa ng Pag-asa	Aksyon Demokratiko	2,839,442	8.00
Parouk Hussin	Koalisyon ng Katapatan at Karanasan sa Kinabukasan	Lakas–CMD	2,821,522	7.95
Didagen Dilangalen	Koalisyon ng Nagkakaisang Pilipino		2,222,069	6.26
Melanio Mauricio Jr.	Alyansa ng Pag-asa	Aksyon Demokratiko	1,144,279	3.22
Pilar Pilapil	Independent		692,137	1.95
Eduardo Nonato Joson	Alyansa ng Pag-asa	Aksyon Demokratiko	631,041	1.78
Eddie Ilarde	Independent		527,865	1.49
Nicanor Gatmaytan Jr.	Alyansa ng Pag-asa	Aksyon Demokratiko	453,693	1.28
Bong Coo	Alyansa ng Pag-asa	Aksyon Demokratiko	338,846	0.95
Oliver Lozano	Kilusang Bagong Lipunan		238,272	0.67
Alvin Alvincent Almirante	Kilusang Bagong Lipunan		206,097	0.58
Ramon Montaño	Partido Isang Bansa, Isang Diwa		159,735	0.45
Matuan Usop	Partido Isang Bansa, Isang Diwa		137,376	0.39
Angel Rosario	Partido Isang Bansa, Isang Diwa		98,932	0.28
Ismael Aparri	Partido Isang Bansa, Isang Diwa		97,430	0.27
Norma Nueva	Kilusang Bagong Lipunan		96,129	0.27
Carmen Borja	Partido Isang Bansa, Isang Diwa		95,755	0.27
Pendatun Decampong	Partido Isang Bansa, Isang Diwa		94,713	0.27
Gerardo del Mundo	Independent		88,962	0.25
El Cid Fajardo	Partido Isang Bansa, Isang Diwa		79,471	0.22
Iderlina Pagunuran	Partido Isang Bansa, Isang Diwa		59,712	0.17
Arturo Estuita	Partido Isang Bansa, Isang Diwa		39,094	0.11
Total			254,216,743	100.00
Total votes			35,510,092	–
Registered voters/turnout			43,536,028	81.56
Source: COMELEC (vote totals), NCSB (turnout)

=== Per coalition ===
Party or alliance		Votes	%	Seats
Koalisyon ng Katapatan at Karanasan sa Kinabukasan	Lakas–CMD	80,684,233	31.74	4
Koalisyon ng Katapatan at Karanasan sa Kinabukasan	Liberal Party	30,008,158	11.80	2
Koalisyon ng Katapatan at Karanasan sa Kinabukasan	People's Reform Party	12,187,401	4.79	1
Koalisyon ng Katapatan at Karanasan sa Kinabukasan	Independent politician	9,914,179	3.90	0
Koalisyon ng Katapatan at Karanasan sa Kinabukasan	Total	132,793,971	52.24	7
Koalisyon ng Nagkakaisang Pilipino	Koalisyon ng Nagkakaisang Pilipino	90,234,627	35.50	5
Koalisyon ng Nagkakaisang Pilipino	Pwersa ng Masang Pilipino	5,718,740	2.25	0
Koalisyon ng Nagkakaisang Pilipino	Total	95,953,367	37.74	5
Alyansa ng Pag-asa	Aksyon Demokratiko	9,816,109	3.86	0
Alyansa ng Pag-asa	Partido para sa Demokratikong Reporma	4,286,838	1.69	0
Alyansa ng Pag-asa	Total	14,102,947	5.55	0
Partido Isang Bansa, Isang Diwa		862,218	0.34	0
Kilusang Bagong Lipunan		540,498	0.21	0
Independent		9,963,742	3.92	0
Total		254,216,743	100.00	12
Total votes		35,510,092	–	
Registered voters/turnout		43,536,028	81.56	

Vote share
K4	52.24%
KNP	37.74%
Others	10.02%

Senate seats
K4	58.33%
KNP	41.67%
Others	0.0%

=== Per party ===
Party	Votes	%	+/–	Seats				
Party	Votes	%	+/–	Up	Before	Won	After	+/−
Koalisyon ng Nagkakaisang Pilipino	90,234,627	35.50	New	2	2	5	5	+3
Lakas–CMD	80,684,233	31.74	+12.21	2	6	4	7	+1
Liberal Party	30,008,158	11.80	+3.93	1	2	2	3	+1
People's Reform Party	12,187,401	4.79	+0.83	0	0	1	1	New
Aksyon Demokratiko	9,362,416	3.68	+0.91	0	0	0	0	0
Pwersa ng Masang Pilipino	5,718,740	2.25	New	0	0	0	0	0
Partido para sa Demokratikong Reporma	4,740,531	1.86	New	0	0	0	0	0
Partido Isang Bansa, Isang Diwa	862,218	0.34	+0.33	0	0	0	0	0
Kilusang Bagong Lipunan	540,498	0.21	−0.15	0	0	0	0	0
Independent	19,877,921	7.82	−31.05	1	6	0	4	−2
Laban ng Demokratikong Pilipino				3	4	0	2	−2
Nationalist People's Coalition				1	1	0	0	−1
PDP–Laban				0	1	0	1	0
Vacancy				2	2	0	1	−1
Total	254,216,743	100.00	–	12	24	12	24	+1
Total votes	35,510,092	–						
Registered voters/turnout	43,536,028	81.56						

Vote share
KNP	33.50%
Lakas	31.74%
LP	11.80%
PRP	4.79%
Independent	7.82%
Others	10.35%

Senate seats won
KNP	41.67%
Lakas	33.33%
LP	16.67%
PRP	8.33%
Independent	0.00%
Others	0.00%

== Defeated incumbents ==
1. Robert Barbers (Lakas/K4), retired from politics, and died in 2005
2. Robert Jaworski (Lakas/K4), retired from politics
3. John Henry Osmeña (independent/K4), ran in 2007 and lost, ran for mayor of Cebu City in 2010 and lost, ran for mayor of Toledo, Cebu in 2013 and won

== See also ==
- Commission on Elections
- Politics of the Philippines
- Philippine elections
- President of the Philippines
- 13th Congress of the Philippines
