= Kabalikat ng Malayang Pilipino =

Defunct Philippine political party merged with Lakas–CMD

Kabalikat ng Malayang Pilipino (KAMPI)
- Leader: Gloria Macapagal Arroyo
- President: Ronaldo Puno
- Chairperson: Tingting Cojuangco
- Spokesperson: Emigdio Tanjuatco
- Founder: Peping Cojuangco; Gloria Macapagal Arroyo
- Founded: 1997
- Dissolved: 2008
- Split from: LDP
- Merged into: Lakas–CMD
- Headquarters: 7th Floor, L.T.A. Building, 118 Perea St. cor Legazpi St., Makati, Philippines
- Ideology: Populism
- Political position: Centre-right
- Colours: Gold, white, blue

The Kabalikat ng Malayang Pilipino (KAMPI) (transl. Shoulder of the Free Filipino), formerly known as the Kabalikat ng Mamamayang Pilipino (transl. Shoulders of the Filipino People), was a political party in the Philippines. It is the main party of former President Gloria Macapagal Arroyo. In June 2008, Kampi merged into the Lakas–CMD.

== History ==
=== Formation and 1998 elections ===
Kabalikat ng Mamamayang Pilipino (KAMPI) was formed during the run up to the 1998 presidential elections as the vehicle for then Senator Gloria Arroyo's presidential campaign, after she defected from the Laban ng Demokratikong Pilipino (LDP), the party she had been with since she was first elected in 1995. Senator Tito Sotto, who is also an LDP stalwart was picked to be her running mate. Before the filing of candidacies, she decided to be the running mate of then Lakas–NUCD presidential hopeful Jose de Venecia. As a result, KAMPI coalesced with Lakas–NUCD, while Sotto joined Laban ng Makabayang Masang Pilipino (LAMMP) as a Senate re-electionist.

=== 2004 elections ===
There were no results available of the last elections for the House of Representatives, but according to the website of the House, the party holds 26 out of 235 seats (State of the Parties, June 2005). The party was renamed as Kabalikat ng Malayang Pilipino, and a member of the Koalisyon ng Katapatan at Karanasan sa Kinabukasan (K-4, Coalition of Truth and Experience for Tomorrow), the coalition that supported president Gloria Macapagal Arroyo's campaign, who won the 2004 presidential elections. Many legislators of the Lakas defected to Kampi.

=== 2007 elections ===
As of March 24, 2007, KAMPI is said to have 67 members of the House of Representatives, 23 provincial governors, and 650 out of the 1610 mayors all over the country. In the May 14, 2007 election, the party won 47 seats.

On January 31, 2008, KAMPI announced that 134 congressman signed a manifesto of "loss of confidence" versus Speaker Jose de Venecia, Jr. Camarines Sur 2nd District Rep. Luis Villafuerte, KAMPI president, said the successor should be Davao City 1st district Rep. Prospero Nograles.

=== Merger with Lakas ===
Former President and Lakas–CMD Chairman Emeritus Fidel V. Ramos announced on February 6, 2008, that Lakas would be the surviving entity after its merger with KAMPI.

Gloria Macapagal Arroyo on June 18, 2008, confirmed the historical merger of the Lakas Christian Muslim Democrats (Lakas–CMD) and KAMPI. Both parties adopted the “equity of the incumbent” principle, as the merger will account for almost 200 national and 8,000 local officials, amid Mrs. Arroyo's prediction of 2010 elections victory. Prospero Nograles, Lakas President and KAMPI Chair Ronaldo Puno signed the covenant at the Davao City regional caucus. On September 30, 2009, the party merger was approved by COMELEC.

=== Post-merger ===
After the merger, by 2009 the newly merged party was raided by opposition bets to strengthen their legislative force for the 2010 elections.

In 2011, Ronnie Puno and Pabling Garcia and their supporters broke away from Lakas to found the National Unity Party (NUP). The party was aimed to support then-President Benigno Aquino III.

== Electoral performance ==
=== Presidential and vice presidential elections ===
Year	Presidential election			Vice presidential election		
Year	Candidate	Vote share	Result	Candidate	Vote share	Result
1998	None (Note: Arroyo's running mate was Jose De Venecia of the Lakas.)		Joseph Estrada (PMP)	Gloria Macapagal Arroyo (Note: Arroyo mainly running under Lakas)	49.56%	Gloria Macapagal Arroyo (Lakas/KAMPI)
2004	Gloria Macapagal Arroyo (Note: Arroyo mainly running under Lakas)	39.99%	Gloria Macapagal Arroyo (Lakas/KAMPI)	None (Note: Arroyo's running mate was Senator Noli De Castro who is an independent.)		Noli de Castro (Independent)

=== Legislative elections ===
House elections	House Seats won	Result	Senate elections	Senate Seats won	Ticket	Result
1998	0 / 257	Lakas plurality	1998	Not participating		LAMMP win 7/12 seats
2001	3 / 256	Lakas plurality (Note: 2 of KAMPI members are running under Lakas and another 1 under Laban ng Demokratikong Pilipino)	2001	Not participating		People Power win 8/13 seats
2004	30 / 261	Lakas plurality (Note: 4 of KAMPI members are running under Lakas and another 1 under Nationalist People's Coalition)	2004	Not participating		K4 win 7/12 seats
2007	44 / 271	Lakas plurality	2007	1 / 12	TEAM Unity	Genuine Opposition win 8/12 seats

== Notable members ==
- Gloria Macapagal Arroyo – Chairman Emeritus; 14th Philippine President, also a member of Lakas
- Ronaldo Puno – Chairman and co-founder of National Unity Party, a breakaway party of Lakas Kampi
- Jose "Peping" Cojuangco, Jr. – Vice Chairman, and former LDP co-founder
- Luis Villafuerte, Sr. – President
- Joker Arroyo – Two-term Senator, second term ran under KAMPI, Two term Congressman
- Manny Pacquiao – World athlete, lost in 2007 congressional elections while in the party.
- Pablo P. Garcia – Former Cebu Governor and co-founder of National Unity Party
- Gwendolyn Garcia – Cebu Governor

== See also ==
- National Unity Party (Philippines)
- Lakas–CMD
- Laban ng Demokratikong Pilipino
