= Rodolfo Biazon =

Filipino military officer and politician (1935–2023)

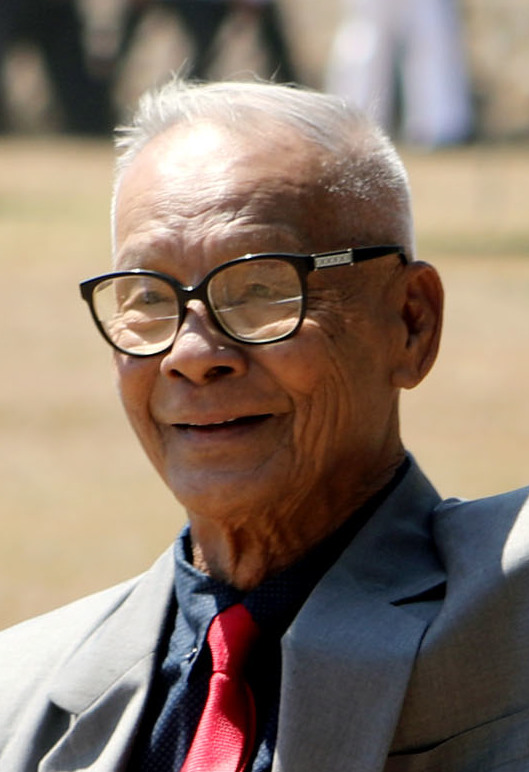
- Biazon in 2019

Senator of the Philippines
- In office June 30, 1998 – June 30, 2010
- In office June 30, 1992 – June 30, 1995

Member of the House of Representatives from Muntinlupa
- In office June 30, 2010 – June 30, 2016
- Preceded by: Ruffy Biazon
- Succeeded by: Ruffy Biazon

21st Chief of Staff of the Armed Forces of the Philippines
- In office January 24, 1991 – April 12, 1991
- President: Corazon Aquino
- Preceded by: Renato de Villa
- Succeeded by: Lisandro Abadia

Vice Chief of Staff of the Armed Forces of the Philippines
- In office January 11, 1990 – May 4, 1991
- Preceded by: MGen. Eduardo Ermita
- Succeeded by: MGen. Guillermo Flores

Commandant of the Philippine Marine Corps
- In office July 23, 1987 – August 7, 1989
- Preceded by: BGen. Brigido Paredes
- Succeeded by: BGen. Eduardo Cabanlig

Superintendent of the Philippine Military Academy
- In office March 1, 1986 – July 22, 1987
- Preceded by: Col. Maximino M. Bejar
- Succeeded by: Cmdre. Rogelio A. Dayan

Personal details
- Born: April 14, 1935 Batac, Ilocos Norte, Commonwealth of the Philippines
- Died: June 12, 2023 (aged 88) Muntinlupa, Philippines
- Resting place: Libingan ng mga Bayani; Taguig, Philippines
- Party: Liberal (2004–2023)
- Other political affiliations: Aksyon (2004); LDP (1992–2004)
- Spouse: Monserrat Bunoan (m. 1961)
- Children: 3, including Ruffy
- Education: FEATI University; Philippine Military Academy (BS)
- Occupation: Soldier & politician
- Profession: Mechanical engineer

Military service
- Allegiance: Philippines
- Branch/service: Philippine Marine Corps
- Years of service: 1961–1991
- Rank: General
- Battles/wars: 1986–87 Coup attempts

Rodolfo "Pong" Gaspar Biazon (Tagalog pronunciation: [ˈbjason], April 14, 1935 – June 12, 2023) was a Filipino politician and Philippine Marine Corps general. He was the Chief of Staff of the Armed Forces of the Philippines (AFP) in early 1991 and then served as a Senator from 1992 to 1995 and from 1998 to 2010.

During his time in the military, he served as superintendent of the Philippine Military Academy (PMA), commandant of the Philippine Marine Corps, Vice Chief of Staff, and finally Chief of Staff of the AFP. After his stints in the senate, he served as the Representative of Muntinlupa from 2010 to 2016.

== Early life and career ==
Biazon was born on April 14, 1935, in Batac, Ilocos Norte. His father Rufino Biazon, was a doughmaker then, while his mother Juliana Gaspar, was a clotheswasher. His father died and left him along with his mother and three younger sisters when he was seven years old. At a young age of eight, he and his sisters had already experienced hardship, especially during the Japanese regime. Living in a makeshift shanty in Cavite, they had to peddle food, collected bottles and newspapers, which were later sold in order to earn a living for the family. In spite of their condition, it did not stop him from obtaining his education.

Biazon enrolled as a Grade One student at the age of eleven in 1946. In order to support his education, and at the same time look for ways to earn money, so he went to school in the morning and worked in the afternoon. He would collect seashells in Manila Bay which were in turn sold at the market. He studied at Jose Rizal Elementary School in Pasay (then in Rizal) for his primary education where he graduated salutatorian. He continued working, washing clothes for other people in order to sustain his high school education at the Arellano University – Jose Abad Santos High School, also in Pasay, in 1955. He also graduated from this school with honors. He stopped doing laundry and instead worked as a laborer in the then Highway 54 (now EDSA), this time to sustain his college education in FEATI where he took mechanical engineering.

Biazon also attended other trainings or schooling which include the TOP Management Program at the Asian Institute of Management; Command and General Staff Course in Quantico, Virginia, United States; Crisis Program in California, United States; Allied Combat Intelligence Course in Okinawa, Japan; Senior Officer Maintenance Course in Kentucky, United States; Amphibious Warfare Course in Quantico, Virginia, United States and, Military Instructors in Norfolk, Virginia, United States.

== Military career ==
Biazon entered the Philippine Military Academy in 1957, although he applied and passed for the US Navy. He was the class goat of PMA Class 1961 yet this did not prevent him from achieving his goal.

As a Philippine Marine, he attained the following posts: Superintendent of PMA in 1986–87, Commandant of the Philippine Marines (PMC) in 1987–1989, Commanding General of the NCR Defense Command in 1988–1990, Armed Forces of the Philippines (AFP) Vice Chief of Staff in 1990-91 and Armed Forces of the Philippines Chief of Staff in 1991.

Biazon was assigned in Davao in 1983 during the Ferdinand Marcos administration. It was the time when the trust and confidence of the civilians in the military were returned as he took the initiative to do so.

During his tenure both as the Commanding General of the AFP NCR Defense Command and Commandant of the Philippine Marine Corps, he quelled an attempted coup by the Reform the Armed Forces Movement (RAM), led by Col. Gringo Honasan. He led the Marines and the officers and men of the AFP NCR Defense Command in foiling the coup attempt.

In early 1990, Viva Films began to plan a film based on Gen. Biazon's life, with Eddie Garcia cast as Biazon and Manuel "Fyke" Cinco to direct, though it did not come to fruition.

Gen. Biazon was chosen to be the third Armed Forces Chief of Staff of the 5th Republic, after Fidel V. Ramos and Renato de Villa, and the first one to come from the ranks of the PMC in 1991. Prior to that, he served then also as the Vice Chief of Staff of the AFP under De Villa. He is the first and only AFP Chief of Staff from the Philippine Marine Corps.

== Awards during his military service ==
- Philippine Republic Presidential Unit Citation
- Martial Law Unit Citation
- Distinguished Service Star
- Gold Cross Medal
- Outstanding Achievement Medal
- Bronze Cross Medal
- Military Merit Medals with one spearhead device and four bronze anahaws
- Military Commendation Medals
- Long Service Medal
- Anti-dissidence Campaign Medal
- Luzon Anti Dissidence Campaign Medal
- Visayas Anti-Dissidence Campaign Medal
- Mindanao Anti-dissidence Campaign Medal
- Jolo and Sulu Campaign Medal
- Disaster Relief & Rehabilitation Operation Ribbon
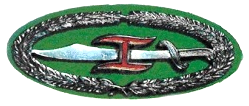
- Combat Commander's Badge
- AFP Parachutist Badge

== Political career ==
=== Senate ===
Biazon was convinced by Paul Aquino, the brother of the late Senator Benigno Aquino Jr., to run for office. He ran for senator in 1992 under Laban ng Demokratikong Pilipino. He was successful, placing 20th to become a senator in the 9th Congress from 1992 to 1995. In 1993, he engaged in a series of dialogues with squatters in Pasay about their resettlement to the province of Cavite. He ran for re-election in 1995 under the Lakas–Laban Coalition, but lost, placing 14th.

After the loss, he ran again for senator in 1998 under Laban ng Makabayang Masang Pilipino and won, resulting to a six-year term. He was the chairman of the Senate Committee on National Defense and Security and Committee on Urban Planning, Housing and Resettlement. Aside from this, he held the following positions in the Senate: vice-chair of the Committees on Agriculture and Food and Foreign Relations, and a member of 15 other Senate committees. He was also the president of the Asian Regional Council Global Parliamentarians on Habitat, the vice-president for Asia Global Parliamentarians on Habitat, the co-chairperson of the Philippine Legislators' Committee on Population and Development Foundation, Inc. (PLCPD) and a member of the Commission on Appointments.

Biazon ran for re-election under the K4 administration coalition in 2004 and won, narrowly beating incumbent Senator Robert Barbers by a margin of 10,685 votes for the 12th place. Barbers filed an electoral protest but died within the year. Biazon continued filing numerous bills and resolution, many of them were passed into law, some of them including:

- Republic Act No. 9208, Anti-Trafficking in Persons Act,
- Republic Act No. 9161, reforming the renting industry
- Republic Act No. 7835, Comprehensive and Integrated Shelter Finance Act,
- Republic Act No. 7742, changing the mandatory membership to the Pag-Ibig Fund
- Republic Act No. 7901, creation of the region of Caraga (Region XIII)
- Republic Act No. 7889, establishing the University of the Philippines Mindanao
- Republic Act No. 7863, the Home Guaranty Corporation Law
- Republic Act No. 7691, Expanding the Jurisdiction of MTC's, MCTC and METC,
- Joint Resolution No. 7, increasing the subsistence allowance of soldiers and policemen,
- Republic Act No. 8763, amending the Home Guarantee Corporation Act
- Republic Act No. 9040, tax exemption of allowances and benefits for members of the Armed Forces of the Philippines
- Republic Act No. 9049, granting monthly gratuity and privileges to awarding of the Medal of Valor

Biazon co-wrote with Senator Orlando Mercado the bill that became Republic Act No. 7898, or the AFP Modernization Act, which provided funding for the Armed Forces of the Philippines to acquire new equipment for a modernization drive. In the succeeding decade after its passage during the Ramos administration, however, relatively few acquisitions of new equipment were made, with the majority of funds allocated to the repair and refurbishment of existing equipment and the purchase of office supplies, with Biazon in 2007 stating that "I cannot consider that AFP modernization". Biazon was also one of the main proponents of the Reproductive Health Bill.

=== House of Representatives ===
Biazon ran for the open seat of his son, Ruffy in the lone district in 2010 as he was term-limited. Ruffy, also term-limited, ran instead for the Senate but was unsuccessful. He faced former broadcaster Dong Puno. He was elected with 46% of the vote. His term started on June 30, 2010. He was then reelected in 2013, defeating four opponents. He decided not to seek reelection in 2016 and was succeeded by his son Ruffy.

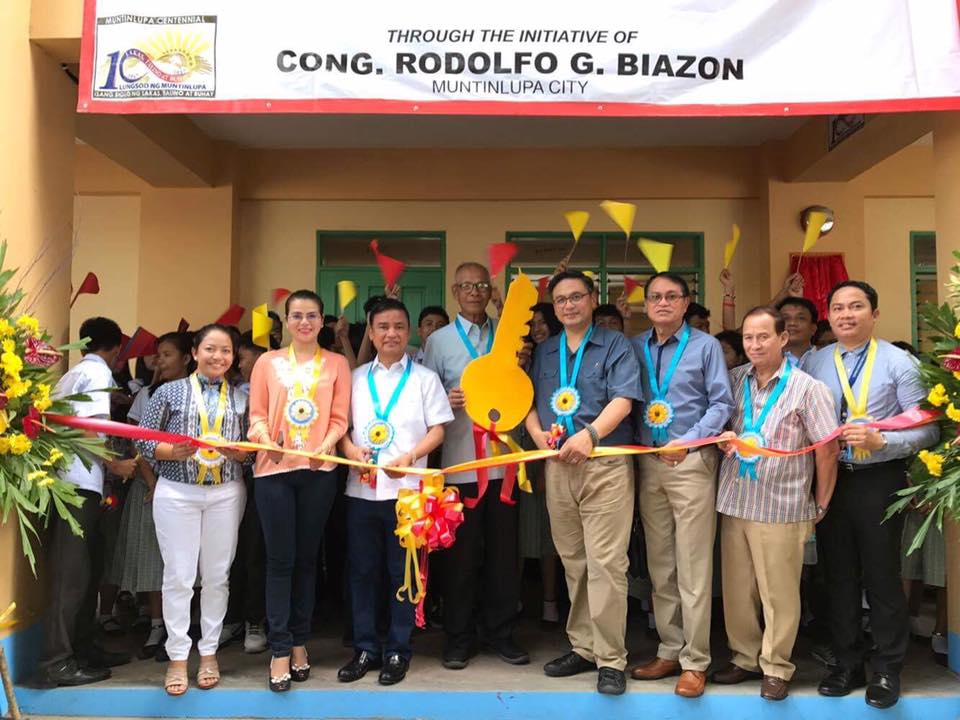
Biazon (5th from right) during the 2017 inauguration of Lakeview Integrated School's new building in Putatan, Muntinlupa, built during his congressional term.

== Electoral history ==
Electoral history of Rodolfo Biazon
Year	Office	Party	Votes received				Result
Year	Office	Party	Total	%	P.	Swing	Result
1992	Senator of the Philippines	LDP	4,863,752	20.05%	20th	—N/a	Won
1995	Senator of the Philippines	LDP	8,587,338	33.37%	14th	—N/a	Lost
1998	Senator of the Philippines	LDP	9,352,964	31.94%	6th	—N/a	Won
2004	Senator of the Philippines	Liberal	10,635,270	29.95%	12th	—N/a	Won
2010	Representative (Muntinlupa at-large)	Liberal	82,128	46.00%	1st	—N/a	Won
2013	Representative (Muntinlupa at-large)	Liberal	101,113	75.55%	1st	—N/a	Won

== Personal life ==
Biazon met Monserrat Narag Bunoan as a classmate in the Philippine Military Academy. Eight months after his graduation in the Philippine Military Academy, he eventually married Monserrat or "Monchie" as she is called on December 3, 1961.

They had three children: Rita Rosanna (first runner-up at the Binibining Pilipinas 1985), Rino Rudiyardo, and Rozzano "Ruffy" Rufino (incumbent mayor of Muntinlupa).

== Illness and death ==
Biazon was diagnosed with lung cancer in July 2022. He later caught pneumonia twice in 2023, with the second being more severe. On May 21, 2023, he was hospitalised for pneumonia and was intubated the next day until June 3.

Biazon died on June 12, 2023, during the 125th Independence Day, at Asian Hospital and Medical Center in Alabang, Muntinlupa, aged 88. His wake was held on June 13–16 at Heritage Park in Taguig. Necrological services for him were later held at the Muntinlupa City Hall on June 18 and at the Senate on June 19. His remains were then transferred to the Philippine Marine Corps headquarters in Taguig on June 19–20, before being finally interred at the Libingan ng mga Bayani on June 20.

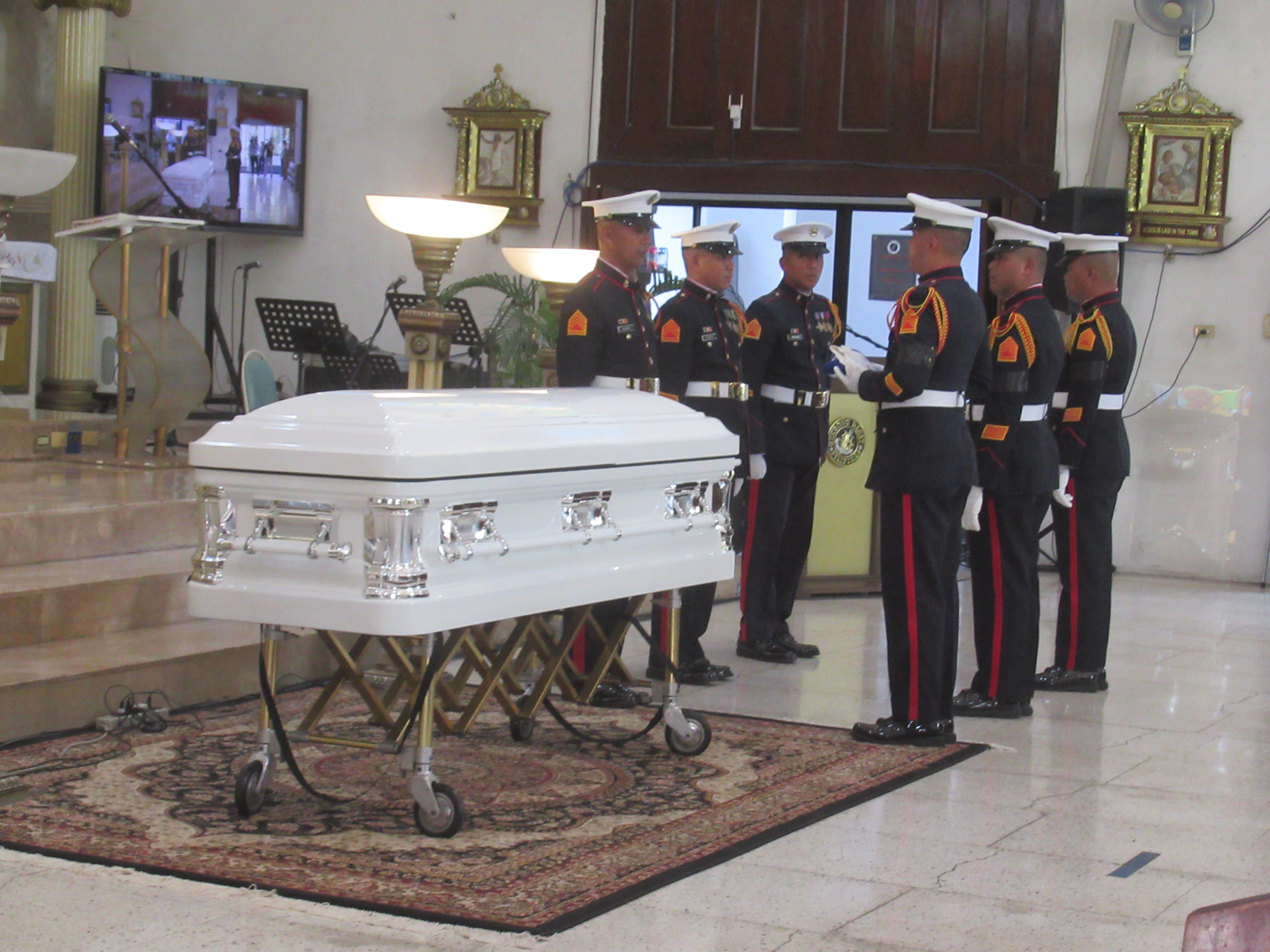
Funeral and wake at The Chapel of the Holy Child, Fort Bonifacio, Taguig

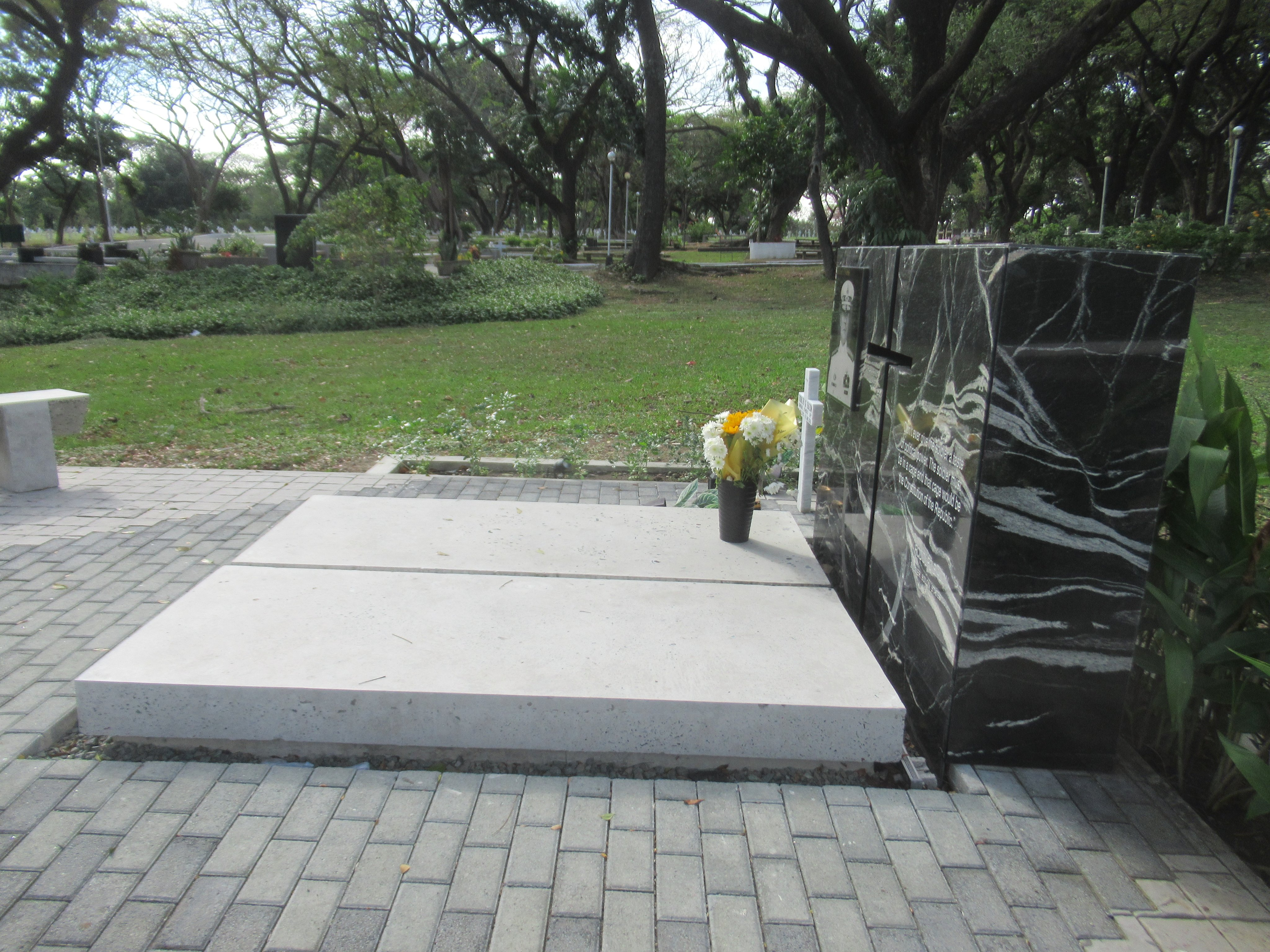
Biazon's grave at the Libingan ng mga Bayani

Military offices
Preceded by Renato de Villa	Chief of Staff of the Armed Forces of the Philippines; 1991	Succeeded by Lisandro Abadia
House of Representatives of the Philippines
Preceded by Ruffy Biazon	Member of the House of Representatives from Muntinlupa; 2010–2016	Succeeded by Ruffy Biazon
