= Koalisyon ng Nagkakaisang Pilipino =

Political alliance supporting Fernando Poe, Jr.'s 2004 campaign

- Leader: Fernando Poe Jr.
- Deputy leader: Loren Legarda
- Senate leader: Edgardo Angara (Note: Member of LDP (seat not up))
- House leader: Chiz Escudero
- Spokesperson: Chiz Escudero
- Founder: Edgardo Angara; Jejomar Binay; Tito Sotto; Juan Ponce Enrile
- Founded: December 11, 2003
- Dissolved: 2004
- Preceded by: Puwersa ng Masa
- Succeeded by: United Opposition; Genuine Opposition
- Coalition members: PDP–Laban; PMP; LDP (Angara wing); NPC (Maceda wing)
- Colors: Blue

The Koalisyon ng Nagkakaisang Pilipino (English: Coalition of United Filipinos), also known as the United Opposition, was the electoral alliance of the dominant opposition in the Philippines during the 2004 Philippine general election. The KNP was composed of Laban ng Demokratikong Pilipino, Partido Demokratiko Pilipino–Lakas ng Bayan and Pwersa ng Masang Pilipino.

The main core of the KNP was the Angara wing of the LDP, which split in late 2003 over the issue of who would be its standard bearer. Majority of LDP members led by Senator Edgardo Angara supported the presidential bid of actor Fernando Poe Jr. The other major party under the coalition was the PMP of deposed president Joseph Estrada.

The KNP fielded Poe and Loren Legarda as its candidates for president and vice president in the 2004 Philippine presidential election. After the 2004 elections, the KNP was replaced by Jejomar Binay-led Genuine Opposition as the main opposition coalition.

== History ==
On December 11, 2003, the opposition parties Pwersa ng Masang Pilipino (PMP), Laban ng Demokratikong Pilipino (LDP) formed KNP, with the addition of Nene Pimintel's PDP–Laban. Pimintel notably voted in favor of evidence examination during the Impeachment trial of Joseph Estrada, and his party joined People Power Coalition in 2001.

Movie star Fernando Poe Jr. and former PNP Chief and Senator Panfilo "Ping" Lacson are the top contenders of the KNP's presidential nomination, with Poe officially selected by the KNP committee which Makati Mayor Jejomar Binay and Senator Juan Ponce Enrile are members. Loren Legarda, who failed to get the Lakas presidential nomination, selected as Vice Presidential nominee in the first month of 2004. Legarda resigned at Lakas after President Arroyo's retraction of her statement in 2002 officially declares intention to run for full term. The Nationalist People's Coalition also joined KNP, with only the members of a wing led by former Senator Ernesto "Ernie" Maceda, and House Minority Leader Chiz Escudero, which became KNP's spokesman.

By mid-2003, Maceda said that multiple meetings of First Gentleman Mike Arroyo and his golfing buddies (which some of them are Arroyo's wife cronies) held at the Macapagal residence at Forbes Park in Makati City to strengthen her campaign.

In April 12, 2004, KNP disclosed the plan of the administration's camp to thwart any protests in case of an Arroyo victory. Is it called "Oplan Checkmate," and it plans to isolate Poe and Legarda from the slate of the coalition who are in "a position to mount mass actions" against the government. One of those contacted was Enrile and Gringo Honasan (who serving as Poe's chief for votes security), notable heroes of the People Power in 1986, and Pimintel.

In April 17, 2004, 11 KNP staff leaves the coalition that either jumps into the administration camp or support other candidates. KNP later denied those and they said that those staff who leave are only finding a higher salary job. Prospero Pichay, who is a congressman from Surigao del Sur said that the coalition should be called "Koalisyon ng Nagkakalasang Pilipino" (English: Coalition of Divided Filipinos). Pichay also said that Poe did not have the skill of a leader as the latter can't unite the opposition.

In 2004, days before the election day, the NPC–Tarlac chapter led by the Tarlac Governor Jose Yap rallied behind Arroyo, but supported KNP's Loren Legarda for vice presidency.

== KNP Senatorial Slate ==
Name	Party	Occupation	Elected
Boots Anson-Roa	PMP	movie and TV personality	No
Didagen Dilangalen	PMP	Representative from Maguindanao	No
Juan Ponce Enrile	PMP	former Senator, former Minister of National Defense	Yes
Salvador Escudero	NPC	former Representative from Sorsogon, former Secretary of Agriculture and former Minister of Agriculture and Food	No
Jinggoy Estrada	PMP	Mayor of San Juan, Metro Manila and son of former President Joseph Estrada	Yes
Ernesto Herrera	LDP	former Senator	No
Alfredo Lim	PMP	former Secretary of the Interior and Local Government, 1998 Liberal Presidential nominee (lost to Joseph Estrada), former mayor of Manila, former Director of the National Bureau of Investigation	Yes
Ernesto Maceda	NPC	former Senator	No
Jamby Madrigal	LDP	former Presidential Adviser on Children's Affairs and former Undersecretary of Social Welfare and Development	Yes
Nene Pimentel	PDP–Laban	Senator	Yes
Amina Rasul	PDP–Laban	Muslim rights advocate, former Chairperson of the National Youth Commission and daughter of former Senator Nina Rasul	No
Francisco Tatad	PMP	Former senator and 1998 PRP Vice presidential candidate	No

== Election results ==
=== Presidential and vice presidential elections ===
Year	Presidential election			Vice presidential election		
Year	Candidate	Vote share	Result	Candidate	Vote share	Result
2004	Fernando Poe Jr.	36.51%	Gloria Macapagal Arroyo (Lakas)	Loren Legarda	46.89%	Noli de Castro (Independent)

=== Legislative elections ===
House election	House Seats won	Result	Senate election	Senate Seats won	Ticket	Result
2004 (Note: Nationalist People's Coalition (53), Laban ng Demokratikong Pilipino (15), Pwersa ng Masang Pilipino (5), PDP–Laban (2))	75 / 261	Lakas/K-4 plurarity	2004	5 / 24	Single party ticket	K-4 win 7/12 seats

==== Senatorial race ====
5 out of 12 candidates won the possible 12 seats in the Senate namely: (in order of votes received)

- Juan Ponce Enrile
- Jinggoy Estrada
- Alfredo Lim
- Jamby Madrigal
- Nene Pimentel

== See also ==
- Koalisyon ng Katapatan at Karanasan sa Kinabukasan (K-4, Coalition of Truth and Experience for Tomorrow), the KNP's rival coalition in the 2004 national elections.
- Fernando Poe Jr. 2004 presidential campaign, the presidential campaign backed by the coalition
- Puwersa ng Masa (Force of the Masses), the opposition's coalition during the 2001 midterm elections.
- Laban ng Makabayang Masang Pilipino (Struggle of Patriotic Filipino Masses), the opposition's coalition during the 1998 Philippine national elections.
