= Gloria Macapagal Arroyo 2004 presidential campaign =

2004 presidential campaign of Gloria Macapagal Arroyo

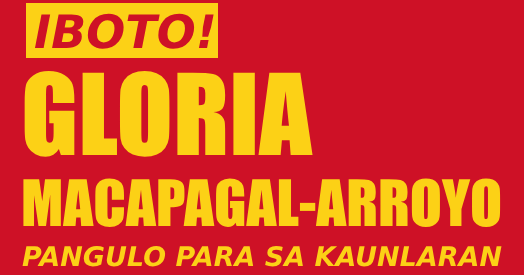
- Campaign: 2004 Philippine presidential election
- Candidate: Gloria Macapagal Arroyo; President of the Philippines (2001–2010); Noli De Castro; Senator (2001–2004)
- Affiliation: K–4; Lakas; KAMPI; Liberal; NPC; PRP; Nacionalista
- Status: Won election: May 10, 2004
- Key people: Gabriel Claudio (campaign manager); Mike Defensor (campaign spokesman)
- Slogan(s): Go, Go, Gloria! Karanasan, Kakayahan, Karunungan, Kalinga

The 2004 presidential campaign of Gloria Macapagal Arroyo was formally announced on October 4, 2003, at her home province in Clark, Pampanga.

== Ambition renunciation ==
On December 30, 2002, speech, President Gloria Macapagal Arroyo surprised the audience and the whole nation of no intention of contesting a presidential campaign. She said that withdrawing from the race would relieve her of the burden of politics and allow her administration to devote the last year and half to strengthening the economy healing the deep divisions within Philippine society, and working for clean and honest elections in 2004.

I have decided, not to run for president in the elections of 2004

— Gloria Macapagal Arroyo

By 2003, President Arroyo declared that again, she has no intention of contesting a presidential campaign for 2004 elections. Arroyo started her "term" as president after kicking out the former president and now jailed Joseph Estrada by the EDSA Dos.

== Campaign ==
But, on October 4, 2003, at Clark, Pampanga she break her statement of not running for 2004 elections. She saying that her change of heart was for a higher cause, and that she could not ignore the call to further serve the country. Before the declaration day, Lakas party vice president Loren Legarda and Vice President Tito Guingona resigned from the party. She tapped Presidential Legislative Liaison Office (PLLO) head Secretary Gabriel Claudio as her campaign manager, and former Quezon City congressman Michael "Mike" Defensor as her campaign spokesperson.

While at campaign, even the rift between Panfilo Lacson's campaign and with actor Fernando Poe Jr.'s ones expected to help Arroyo to top the survey, as she only behind Poe. But even though rift still ongoing, Poe still tops many surveys.

Arroyo also challenged Poe to debate in national television, but Poe decline those.

== Harassment vs Lacson ==
Lacson's campaign team received harassment from the Arroyo campaign, such as tearing down their posters.

== Political positions ==
=== Government system ===
By January 2004, Arroyo stated that she supports the shift of the government system into parliamentary due to gridlocks caused by the current president system.

== Endorsements ==
Gloria Macapagal Arroyo

Philippine Congress

- Jose De Venecia, Congressman from Pangasinan's 4th district, Speaker of the House (1992–1998; 2001–2008)
- Prospero Pichay, Congressman from Surigao del Sur's 1st district
- Mark Cojuangco, Congressman from Pangasinan's 5th district
- Charlie Cojuangco, Congressman from Negros Occidental's 4th district (1998–2007)
- Gilbert Teodoro, Congressman from Tarlac's 1st district (1998–2007)

Governors

- Jose Yap, Governor of Tarlac

City Mayors

- Rodrigo Duterte, Mayor of Davao City
- Edward Hagedorn, Mayor of Puerto Princesa
- Jerry Treñas, Mayor of Iloilo City
- Tomas Osmeña, Mayor of Cebu City

Celebrities

- Boy Abunda, TV host, showbiz columnist
- Kris Aquino, Actress
- Nora Aunor, Actress, producer, singer

Political and youth Organizations

- PRO-GLORIA for Progressive and Responsible Organizations for Good Leadership, Outstanding Reforms and Intelligent Actions,
- Bigkis Pinoy
- Lakas Pinoy,
- Kalipi,
- Aguman ng Kapampangan,
- Kaisahan ng Mamamayan para sa Bayan (Kaisambayan),
- Kaibigan ng OFW,
- National Confederation of Tricycle Operators and Drivers Association,
- United Filipino Seafarers,
- Muslim Peace and Order Council for Metro Manila,
- E-Gloria, and
- Team Gloria

Religious organizations

- Iglesia Ni Cristo,
- El Shaddai
- Jesus Miracle Crusade
- Kingdom of Jesus Christ

On January 29, 2004, PRO-GLORIA for Progressive and Responsible Organizations for Good Leadership, Outstanding Reforms and Intelligent Actions pledged to Arroyo for mobilizing members to boost Arroyo's campaign and K-4 by parallel method. Also, Bigkis Pinoy, Lakas Pinoy, Kalipi, Aguman ng Kapampangan, Kaisahan ng Mamamayan para sa Bayan (Kaisambayan), Kaibigan ng OFW, the National Confederation of Tricycle Operators and Drivers Association, United Filipino Seafarers, the Muslim Peace and Order Council for Metro Manila, and youth groups E-Gloria and Team Gloria joined Arroyo.

The issue between Lacson and Poe that splits opposition made the Iglesia Ni Cristo, El Shaddai and the Jesus Miracle Crusade endorse Arroyo.

== Electoral Protest by Poe and Hello Garci ==
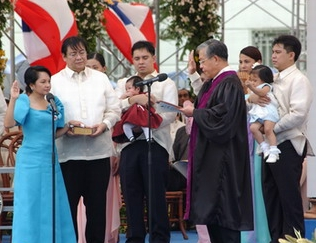
Arroyo, taking her oath of office for a full-term as president in Cebu City. In front of her is Chief Justice Hilario Davide Jr. The result of the election was a loss for Poe.

After Poe's unsuccessful bid to the presidency, his supporters, which include the deposed Estrada's supporters, viewed the election results as flawed, and came under legal protest by Poe and his vice-presidential running-mate, former Senator Loren Legarda. The poll protest was later thrown out by the Supreme Court acting as the Presidential Electoral Tribunal, as well as Legarda's protest. Poe Jr. died on December 14, 2004, before planning to appeal the protest.

In 2006, Claudio affirmed that Arroyo cheated to win 2004 elections. In the same year, Arroyo apologized for the cheating scandal.

On January 25, 2008, a Pulse Asia survey (commissioned by the Genuine Opposition (GO) per former Senator Sergio Osmeña III) stated that 58% percent of Filipinos in Mindanao believed that President Gloria Macapagal Arroyo cheated in the 2004 Philippine general election. 70% also "believed that because of recurring allegations of election fraud, the credibility of the balloting process in Mindanao was at a record low." Many Pangasinenses, on the other hand, still find it really hard to believe that Poe got no votes at all in the municipality of Santo Tomas, Pangasinan.

== See also ==
- Panfilo Lacson 2004 presidential campaign
- Fernando Poe Jr. 2004 presidential campaign
- Raul Roco 2004 presidential campaign
- Hello Garci scandal
