= Eddie Gil =

Filipino singer and comedian (born 1944)

Eddie Conde Gil (born February 7, 1944, in Masbate) is a Filipino singer and comedian who attempted to run for President of the Philippines during the 2004 presidential elections. However, he was disqualified from running by the Commission on Elections, citing his inability to begin a national campaign and marking him as a 'nuisance candidate.' Gil appealed his disqualification to the Philippine Supreme Court, where it was upheld. A self-proclaimed billionaire, he promised fellow Filipinos to pay off the national debt with his own finances. At the same time, he was under investigation for unpaid hotel bills he incurred on the campaign trail in Cagayan de Oro, and for failing to pay people who had provided services to his campaign.

In June 2010, Gil was arrested with 3 others in Mauritius on fraud charges. Gil presented a forged 10 Billion Euro bank guarantee to Investec Bank Mauritius. The false bank guarantee was to be used to solicit a loan. However, in August 2011, the Supreme Court of Mauritius quashed the conviction of Gil and two co-appellants on appeal, ruling that presenting the false document did not rise to the level of fraud in Mauritius law.
