= 2004 Philippine presidential election =

14th election of the Philippine president

- May 10, 2004
- Turnout: 76.3% (▼10.2pp)
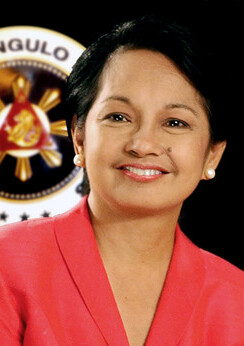

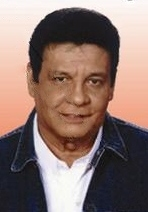

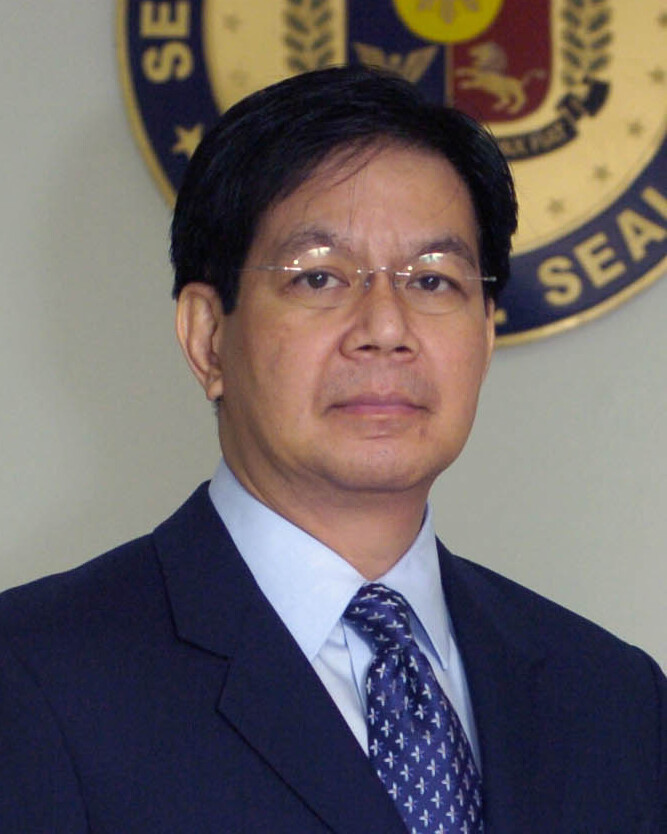

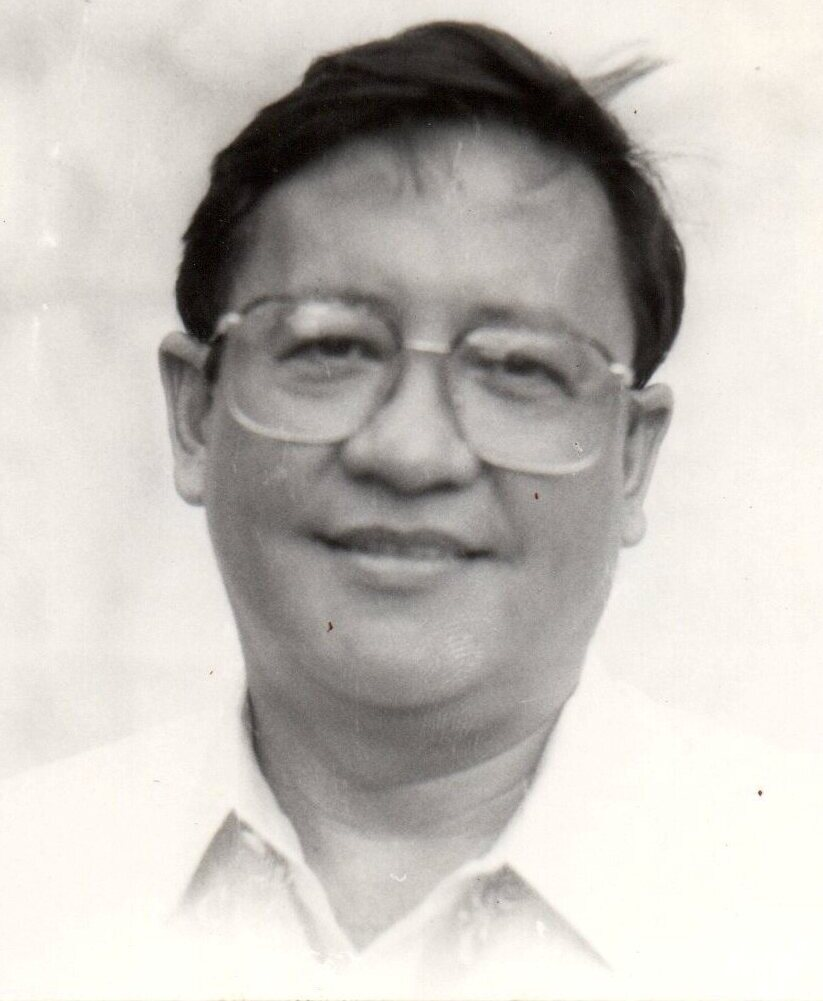
Candidate	Gloria Macapagal Arroyo	Fernando Poe Jr.
Party	Lakas	Independent
Alliance	K4	KNP
Running mate	Noli de Castro	Loren Legarda
Popular vote	12,905,808	11,782,232
Percentage	39.99%	36.51%
Candidate	Panfilo Lacson	Raul Roco
Party	LDP (Aquino wing)	Aksyon
Running mate	N/A	Herminio Aquino
Popular vote	3,510,080	2,082,762
Percentage	10.88%	6.45%
- Results per province/city: colors indicate which candidate had the highest number votes in a province/city.
President before election
Gloria Macapagal Arroyo
Lakas
Elected President
Gloria Macapagal Arroyo
Lakas
- 2004 Philippine vice presidential election
- May 10, 2004
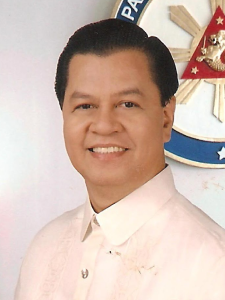

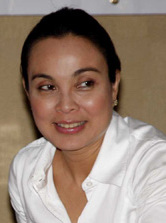
Candidate	Noli de Castro	Loren Legarda
Party	Independent	Independent
Alliance	K4	KNP
Popular vote	15,100,431	14,218,709
Percentage	49.80%	46.89%
- Map showing the official results taken from provincial and city certificates of canvass. The inset shows Metro Manila.
Vice President before election
Teofisto Guingona Jr.
Independent
Elected Vice President
Noli de Castro
Independent

Presidential and vice presidential elections were held in the Philippines on May 10, 2004. The incumbent president Gloria Macapagal Arroyo and incumbent Senator Noli de Castro defeated the film actor Fernando Poe Jr. and incumbent Senator Loren Legarda, respectively.

Under the Philippine constitution, presidents are restricted to a single six-year term, but can be eligible for re-election if they have served less than four years in office. Arroyo succeeded President Joseph Estrada in 2001 after Estrada was removed from office. At the time of the election, she had served as President three years, therefore making her eligible for re-election.

This election was also held at a period in modern Philippine history marked by serious political polarization, resulting in less candidates for the presidency and vice presidency compared to the preceding two elections. Arroyo served as vice president under her predecessor, Joseph Estrada, and ascended to the presidency after Estrada resigned after being impeached with charges of plunder and corruption in 2000. As Arroyo was not elected to the presidency, she was eligible for election to a full term under the 1987 Constitution. Despite initially declaring that she would not run in 2004, Arroyo later launched a bid for the presidency, becoming the first president since the People Power Revolution in 1986 to run for a second term. Poe Jr. emerged as her leading opponent, owing to his populist platform and popularity with the working class.

Arroyo and de Castro became the first presidential ticket to win together since 1986; this feat would not be repeated until 2022, when Bongbong Marcos and Sara Duterte won together as part of the UniTeam ticket.

This election first saw the implementation of the Overseas Absentee Voting Act of 2003, which enabled Filipinos in over 70 countries to vote.

== Background ==
The political climate leading up to the 2004 elections was one of the most emotional in the country's history since the 1986 elections that resulted in the exile of Ferdinand Marcos. Philippine society has become polarized between the followers of former president Joseph Estrada who have thrown their support for Estrada's close associate Fernando Poe, Jr. and those who support incumbent Gloria Macapagal Arroyo, or at best oppose Estrada.

The several months leading to the May elections saw several presidential scandals, Arroyo reversing her earlier decision not to run for president, the sudden but not unexpected candidacy of Fernando Poe, Jr., defection of key political figures from the Arroyo camp to the opposition, the controversial automated elections initiative of the COMELEC, and the split of the dominant opposition party, Laban ng Demokratikong Pilipino, between Poe and Panfilo Lacson.

=== Gloria Macapagal Arroyo's candidacy ===
On a speech given on Rizal Day, December 30, 2002, Gloria Macapagal Arroyo declared that she would not run in the 2004 elections. She said that withdrawing from the race would relieve her of the burden of politics and allow her administration to devote the last year and half to strengthening the economy healing the deep divisions within Philippine society, and working for clean and honest elections in 2004.

However, on October 4, 2003, Arroyo said that she would seek a full-term presidency, saying that her change of heart was for a higher cause, and that she could not ignore the call to further serve the country.

=== Fernando Poe, Jr.'s candidacy ===
Months before the elections, members of the opposition were encouraging actor Fernando Poe, Jr., a close friend of former president Joseph Estrada to run for president. Poe was very popular with the masses and it was widely believed that he would be a sure winner if he ran for president.

On November 27, 2003, Poe announced during a press conference held at the Manila Hotel that he would run for president.

However, on January 9, 2004, Victorino X. Fornier (a private citizen) filed a case against Poe and the COMELEC, saying that Poe was not eligible to run as he was not a natural-born Filipino before the COMELEC. On January 23, the COMELEC dismissed the petition for lack of merit. On February 10, Fornier finally filed the case to the Supreme Court, seeking for Poe to be disqualified from the race. His case was later merged with cases filed by Maria Jeanette C. Tecson, and Felix B. Desiderio, Jr., and by Zoilo Antonio G. Velez.

==== Death of Lawyer Maria Jeanette Tecson ====
On September 28, 2007, 8:30 p.m, Senior Superintendent Francisco Uyami, Pasig police chief stated that lawyer Maria Tecson, 40, had been found dead (in a state of rigor mortis) inside room 204 at the Richmond Hotel, San Miguel Avenue, Pasig (with her throat slit and with cuts on her wrist). Maria Jeanette Tecson, Zoilo Velez (promoted to Court of Appeals Justice) and Victorino Fornier filed the disqualification case against Fernando Poe, Jr. She claimed Poe was born out of wedlock, and that while Poe's birth certificate was dated 1939, his parents Allan Poe and American mother Bessie Kelly did not marry until 1940.

On March 3, the Supreme Court, said in its decision that for lack of jurisdiction and prematurity, and ruling that Poe's father, Allan F. Poe would have been a Filipino citizen by virtue of the en masse Filipinization enacted by the Philippine Bill of 1902. Also, even if Poe had not been a natural-born Filipino citizen, he could not be held guilty of having made a material misrepresentation in his certificate of candidacy.

=== Eddie Gil's candidacy ===
The Commission on Elections originally affirmed the candidacies of six people for the president. The sixth person running for president was Eduardo "Eddie" Gil. The party of Eduardo Villanueva filed a petition with the COMELEC seeking to disqualify Eddie Gil on the basis of him being a nuisance candidate, his incapacity to mount a nationwide campaign, and that because he was running with the aim to confuse voters because of their similar names.

Eddie Gil claims to be an international banker having a net worth of billions of dollars. His platform for presidency promised to make every Filipino a millionaire within his first 100 days of being elected. He also promised to pay off the Philippines' debt, worth trillions of pesos, from his own pocket. This was widely ridiculed, especially after a recent incident in which a check he had issued to pay his hotel bills during a campaign sortie, bounced.

=== The LDP split and Lacson's campaign ===
The Laban ng Demokratikong Pilipino party (LDP) would form the core of the main opposition party, the Koalisyon ng Nagkakaisang Pilipino (KNP). However, members of the party disagreed on which person to support for president. Panfilo Lacson, a member of the party, advanced his candidacy for president but was not considered by Edgardo Angara, the president of the party. Angara supported Fernando Poe, Jr. Together with the party's secretary-general Agapito "Butz" Aquino, Lacson gathered the support of some members of the party and went ahead with his candidacy. The LDP was subsequently polarized between those supporting Angara and Poe, and those for Lacson and Aquino.

By then, Poe and Lacson have both filed their certificates of candidacies for president. According to the rules of candidacy, every presidential candidate must have a political party to back him or her. With the obvious split within the ranks of the LDP, and with no signs that the two factions would come to an agreement, the COMELEC decided to informally split the party into the Aquino and the Angara wings. Lacson then ran under the LDP - Aquino Wing, and Poe under the LDP - Angara Wing, which would later become the KNP.

Before and during the campaign period, there had been numerous unification talks between the two factions. The opposition saw the need to become united under one banner to boost their chances of winning the presidential election against the organized political machinery of Arroyo. The plans of unification did not materialize due to the stubbornness of both Poe and Lacson. Lacson wanted Poe to concede to him and run as his vice-presidential candidate while the supporters of Poe wanted Lacson to back out from his candidacy and instead support Poe, citing his low performance in the surveys.

=== COMELEC's move for an automated elections ===
Elections in the Philippines have always been a manual process with the results for national positions often being announced more than a month after election day. An attempt to rectify this was done by the Commission on Elections by automating the process of counting the votes. More than 30 billion pesos were spent in acquiring counting machines that were never used in this elections because of numerous controversies and political opposition.

== Parties and coalitions ==
This election has seen strong shifts of alliances and new parties as candidates switched allegiances. The two major coalitions seen in this elections were the K-4 (Koalisyon ng Katapatan at Karanasan sa Kinabukasan), of the administration, and the KNP (Koalisyon ng Nagkakaisang Pilipino), the united opposition.

=== Koalisyon ng Nagkakaisang Pilipino (KNP) ===
The Koalisyon ng Nagkakaisang Pilipino (Coalition of United Filipinos), or KNP, is the coalition of the united opposition. Its standard bearers are Fernando Poe, Jr. for president and Sen. Loren Legarda for vice-president. The leading parties of this coalition is the Laban ng Demokratikong Pilipino (LDP-Angara Wing), the PDP–Laban and the Pwersa ng Masang Pilipino. the LDP split is caused by stubbornness between FPJ and Ping Lacson, especially with the support of the former president Joseph Estrada and former first lady Imelda Marcos. The other major party under this coalition is Estrada's Partido ng Masang Pilipino (PMP, Party of the Filipino Masses).

=== Alyansa ng Pag-asa ===
The third major coalition running in this election is the Alyansa ng Pag-asa (Alliance of Hope), This coalition fielded Raul Roco for president and Herminio Aquino for vice-president. The three major parties supporting this coalition are Roco's Aksyon Demokratiko (Democratic Action), former Defense Sec. Renato de Villa's Reporma Party, and Lito Osmeña's Promdi (Probinsya Muna [Provinces First] Development Party). The three parties were the ones that bolted out of the People Power Coalition.

=== Bangon Pilipinas Movement (BPM) ===
The Bangon Pilipinas (Rise up, Philippines) Movement is the political party of Bro. Eddie Villanueva. It consists mostly of volunteers, a majority of whom came from Villanueva's Jesus Is Lord church (Villanueva resigned from the church before submitting his candidacy, to prevent questions on separation of church and state).

=== Laban ng Demokratikong Pilipino (LDP – Aquino wing) ===
A faction named after the party's secretary-general Butz Aquino, this was composed of Panfilo Lacson's supporters in the LDP Party.

=== Partido Isang Bansa, Isang Diwa ===
This was Eddie Gil's organization. Gil was deemed a nuisance candidate and was disqualified from the presidential race, however, the party qualified for other positions.

== Endorsements ==
=== Organizations and some volunteers ===
On January 29, 2004, PRO-GLORIA for Progressive and Responsible Organizations for Good Leadership, Outstanding Reforms and Intelligent Actions pledged to Arroyo for mobilizing members to boost Arroyo's campaign and K-4 by parallel method. Also, Bigkis Pinoy, Lakas Pinoy, Kalipi, Aguman ng Kapampangan, Kaisahan ng Mamamayan para sa Bayan (Kaisambayan), Kaibigan ng OFW, the National Confederation of Tricycle Operators and Drivers Association, United Filipino Seafarers, the Muslim Peace and Order Council for Metro Manila, and youth groups E-Gloria and Team Gloria joined Arroyo.

=== Religious endorsements ===
Iglesia Ni Cristo (INC) and El Shaddai are known to be courted by many candidates, as INC was rumored to have support for Lacson's campaign, and Poe courted the religious organization to get their endorsement. El Shaddai was poised to endorse Arroyo in 2003. When unification talks between Lacson and Poe became impossible, Later, Arroyo was also endorsed by INC.

== Candidates ==
Presidential candidate	Position	Party	Vice presidential candidate	Position	Party	Campaign
Panfilo Lacson	Senator	Laban ng Demokratikong Pilipino (Aquino wing)	None			(Campaign)
Gloria Macapagal Arroyo	President	Lakas–CMD	Noli de Castro	Senator	Independent	(Campaign)
Fernando Poe Jr.	None	Koalisyon ng Nagkakaisang Pilipino	Loren Legarda	Senator	Koalisyon ng Nagkakaisang Pilipino	(Campaign)
Raul Roco	Former Secretary of Education (2001–2002)	Aksyon Demokratiko	Herminio Aquino	Former Vice Governor of Tarlac (1998–2001)	Aksyon Demokratiko	(Campaign)
Eddie Villanueva	None	Bangon Pilipinas	None			
None			Rodolfo Pajo	None	Partido Isang Bansa, Isang Diwa	

== Opinion polling ==
=== President ===
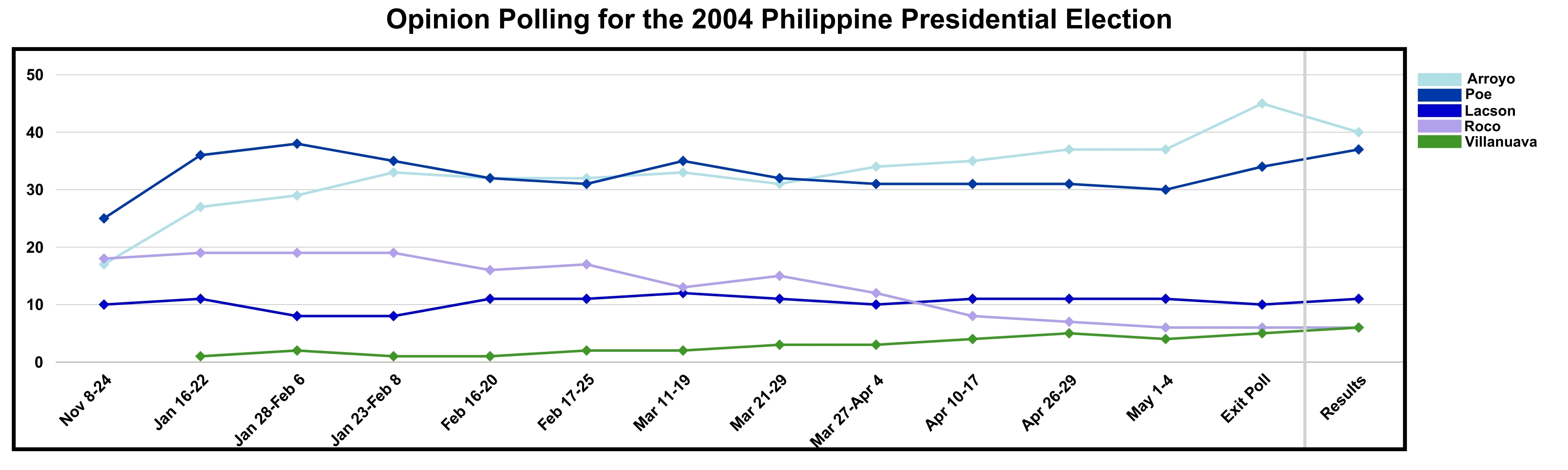

Poll source	Date(s) conducted	Sample size	Margin of error	Arroyo	Gil	Lacson	Poe	Roco	Villanueva	Undecided
SWS	Exit poll	4,445	2%	45%	—N/a	10%	34%	6%	5%	—N/a
SWS	May 1–4	2,000	2.5%	37%	0.3%	11%	30%	6%	4%	12%
Pulse Asia	Apr 26–29	1,800	2.4%	37%	—N/a	11%	31%	7%	5%	Undecided 2%; none 6%
SWS	Mar 21–29	1,400	3%	31.4%	—N/a	11.2%	32.0%	15.0%	2.8%	7.6%
Pulse Asia	Mar 27 – Apr 4	4,800	1.4%	34%	—N/a	10%	31%	12%	3%	10%
SWS	Mar 11–19	2,000	2.2%	33%	0.5%	12%	35%	13%	2.4%	4.6%
SWS	Feb 17–25	1,200	2.5%	31.8%	0.03%	11.4%	30.5%	17.9%	1.8%	6.6%
Pulse Asia	Feb 16–20	1,800	2.3%	31.9%	0.2%	10.7%	31.7%	16.2%	1.2%	8.1%
SWS	Jan 28 – Feb 6	3,600	1.6%	28.7%	0.2%	8.4%	37.5%	19.2%	1.7%	6%
Pulse Asia	Jan 23 – Feb 8	1,800	2.3%	33.4%	0.3%	8.3%	34.6%	19.1%	1.2%	3.2%
SWS	Jan 16–22	1,200	2.5%	27%	0.1%	11%	36%	19%	1%	5%
SWS	Nov 8–24	1,200	2.5%	17%	—N/a	10%	25%	18%	—N/a	24%; undecided 6%

=== Vice president ===
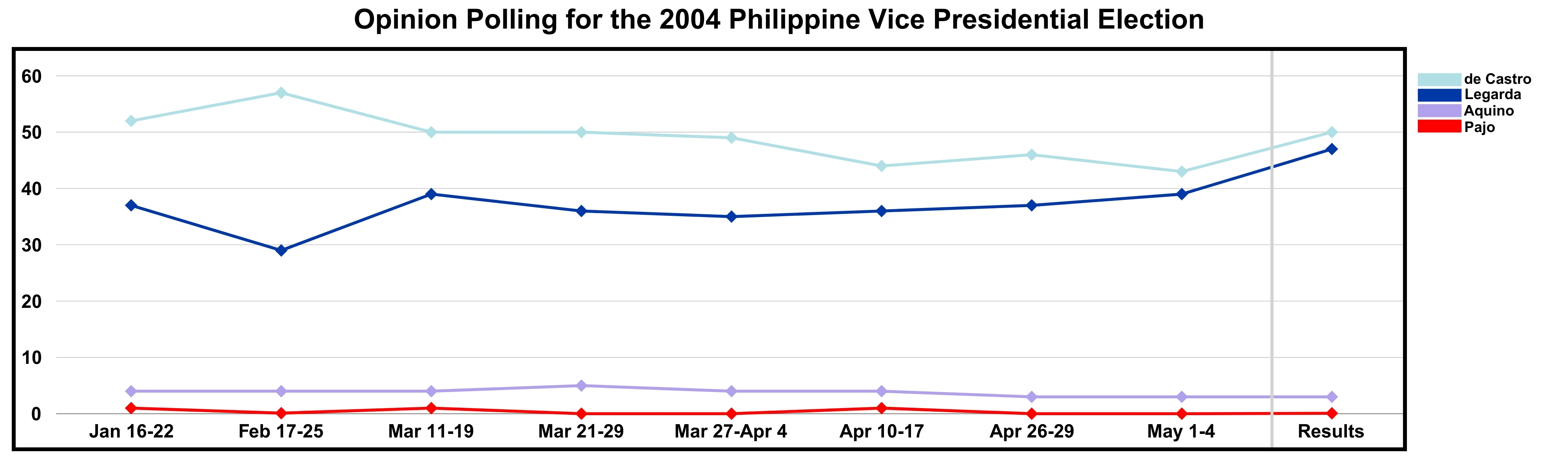

Poll source	Date(s) conducted	Sample size	Margin of error	Aquino	de Castro	Legarda	Pajo	Undecided
SWS	May 1–4	2,000	3%	3%	43%	39%	0.4%	14%
Pulse Asia	Apr 26–29	1,800	2.4%	3%	46%	37%	0.1%	Undecided 2%; none 12%
SWS	Apr 10–17	1,400	3%	4%	43.9%	35.5%	0.6%	13.9%
Pulse Asia	Mar 27 – Apr 4	4,800	1.4%	4%	49%	35%	0.4%	13%
SWS	Mar 21–29	1,400	3%	5%	50%	36%	0.4%	8%
SWS	Mar 11–19	2,000	2.2%	4%	50%	39%	0.6%	7%
SWS	Feb 17–25	1,200	2.5%	4%	57%	29%	0.1%	9%
SWS	Jan 16–22	1,200	2.5%	4%	52%	37%	1%	6%

== Results ==
The official results of the election were released in staggered dates with most winners in local elective positions declared within two weeks from the May 10 election date. The winners in the Senatorial and Party-list Representative elections were declared on May 24, with the exception of the 12th senator which was announced on June 3. The results of the presidential and vice-presidential races were finalized by the Congress on June 20, more than a month after the elections. Out of the 43,895,324 registered voters, about 33.5 million ballots were cast giving a voter turn-out of 76.34%.

Shown below are the official tallies of the Presidential and Vice-Presidential races.

=== President ===
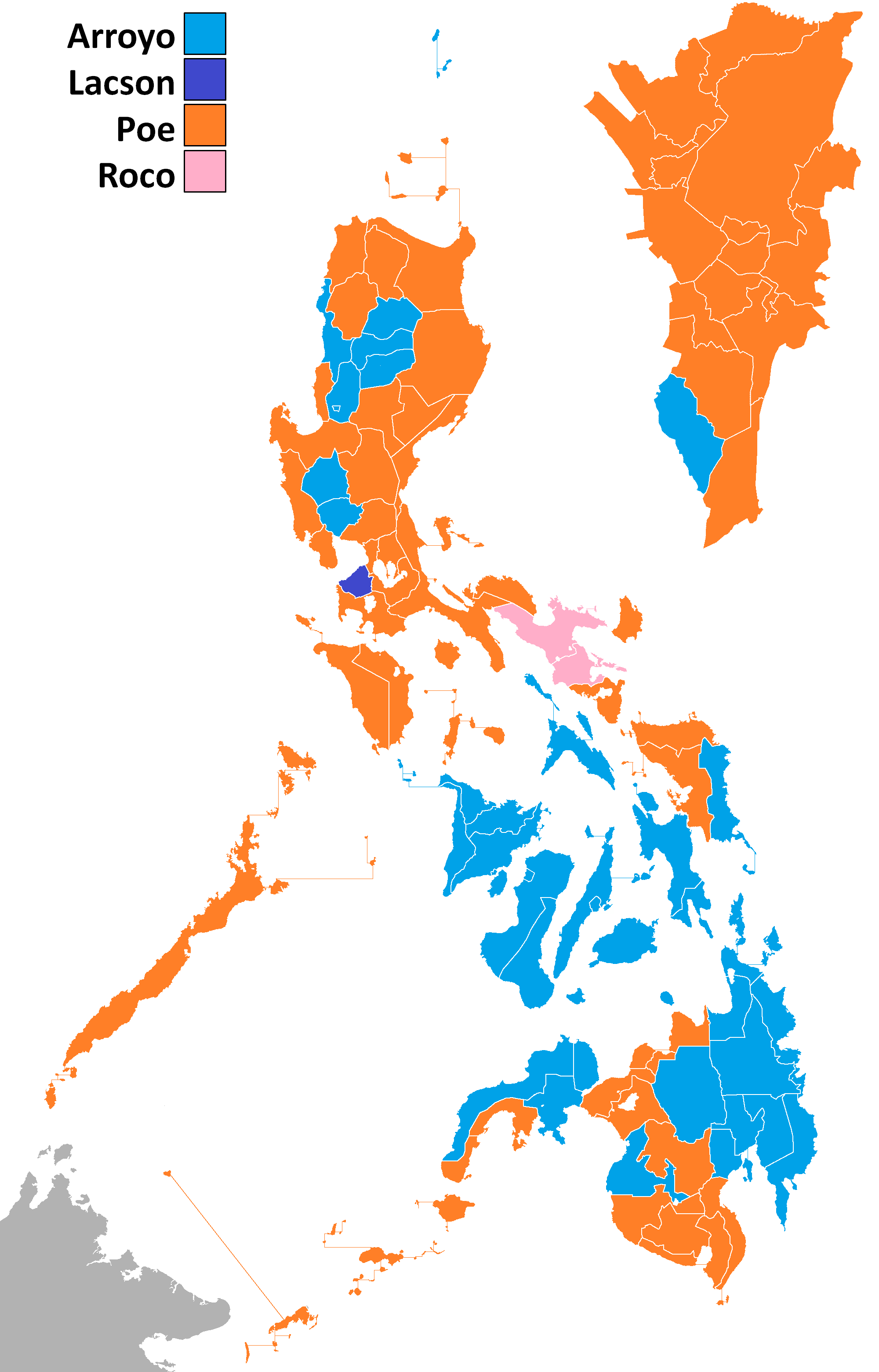
According to NAMFREL results, Poe won in five provinces: Sultan Kudarat, Sulu, Tawi-Tawi, Basilan and Lanao del Sur, which were won by Arroyo in the official congressional canvass. Meanwhile, Arroyo won in Davao del Norte, which was won by Poe in the official congressional canvass.

Candidate	Party	Votes	%
Gloria Macapagal Arroyo (incumbent)	Lakas–CMD	12,905,808	39.99
Fernando Poe Jr.	Koalisyon ng Nagkakaisang Pilipino	11,782,232	36.51
Panfilo Lacson	Laban ng Demokratikong Pilipino (Aquino wing) (Note: Lacson ran under the wing of the LDP led by Butz Aquino; the rest of the party supported Poe's candidacy.)	3,510,080	10.88
Raul Roco	Aksyon Demokratiko	2,082,762	6.45
Eddie Villanueva	Bangon Pilipinas	1,988,218	6.16
Total		32,269,100	100.00
Valid votes		32,269,100	96.30
Invalid/blank votes		1,240,992	3.70
Total votes		33,510,092	100.00
Registered voters/turnout		43,895,324	76.34

Popular vote
Arroyo	39.99%
Poe	36.51%
Lacson	10.88%
Roco	6.45%
Villanueva	6.16%

==== By region ====
Region	Arroyo		Poe		Lacson		Roco		Villanueva	
Region	Votes	%	Votes	%	Votes	%	Votes	%	Votes	%
Ilocos Region	685,356	35.85	837,613	43.81	237,593	12.43	55,975	2.93	95,329	4.99
Cordillera Administrative Region	224,686	39.53	148,426	26.11	92,191	16.22	29,670	5.22	73,449	12.92
Cagayan Valley	362,548	32.33	501,088	44.69	166,991	14.89	30,604	2.73	60,042	5.35
Central Luzon	1,408,196	37.57	1,592,678	42.50	353,577	9.43	151,073	4.03	242,394	6.47
National Capital Region	1,048,016	26.46	1,452,389	36.67	764,880	19.31	307,099	7.75	387,899	9.79
Calabarzon	970,275	23.74	1,756,485	42.98	785,585	19.22	247,691	6.06	327,028	8.00
Mimaropa	236,841	26.46	478,234	53.43	82,306	9.20	32,075	3.58	65,654	7.33
Bicol Region	540,638	28.91	465,480	24.89	74,286	3.97	732,171	39.15	57,657	3.08
Western Visayas	1,578,340	58.94	692,746	25.87	125,069	4.67	139,714	5.22	141,967	5.30
Central Visayas	1,810,946	73.42	405,832	16.45	99,193	4.02	96,791	3.92	53,912	2.19
Eastern Visayas	702,785	45.54	670,000	43.23	78,577	5.07	41,481	2.68	53,912	3.48
Zamboanga Peninsula	537,838	48.27	441,799	39.65	51,739	4.64	26,897	2.41	56,068	5.03
Northern Mindanao	642,488	43.05	630,059	42.22	86,455	5.79	44,318	2.97	89,094	5.97
Davao Region	618,110	41.20	626,786	41.78	127,598	8.51	43,737	2.92	84,032	5.60
Soccsksargen	396,772	32.68	467,525	38.51	255,274	21.03	31,213	2.57	63,209	5.21
Caraga	477,461	54.35	266,706	30.36	51,129	5.82	19,837	2.26	63,283	7.20
ARMM	558,454	59.24	302,132	32.05	48,381	5.13	26,061	2.76	7,605	0.81

=== Vice-President ===
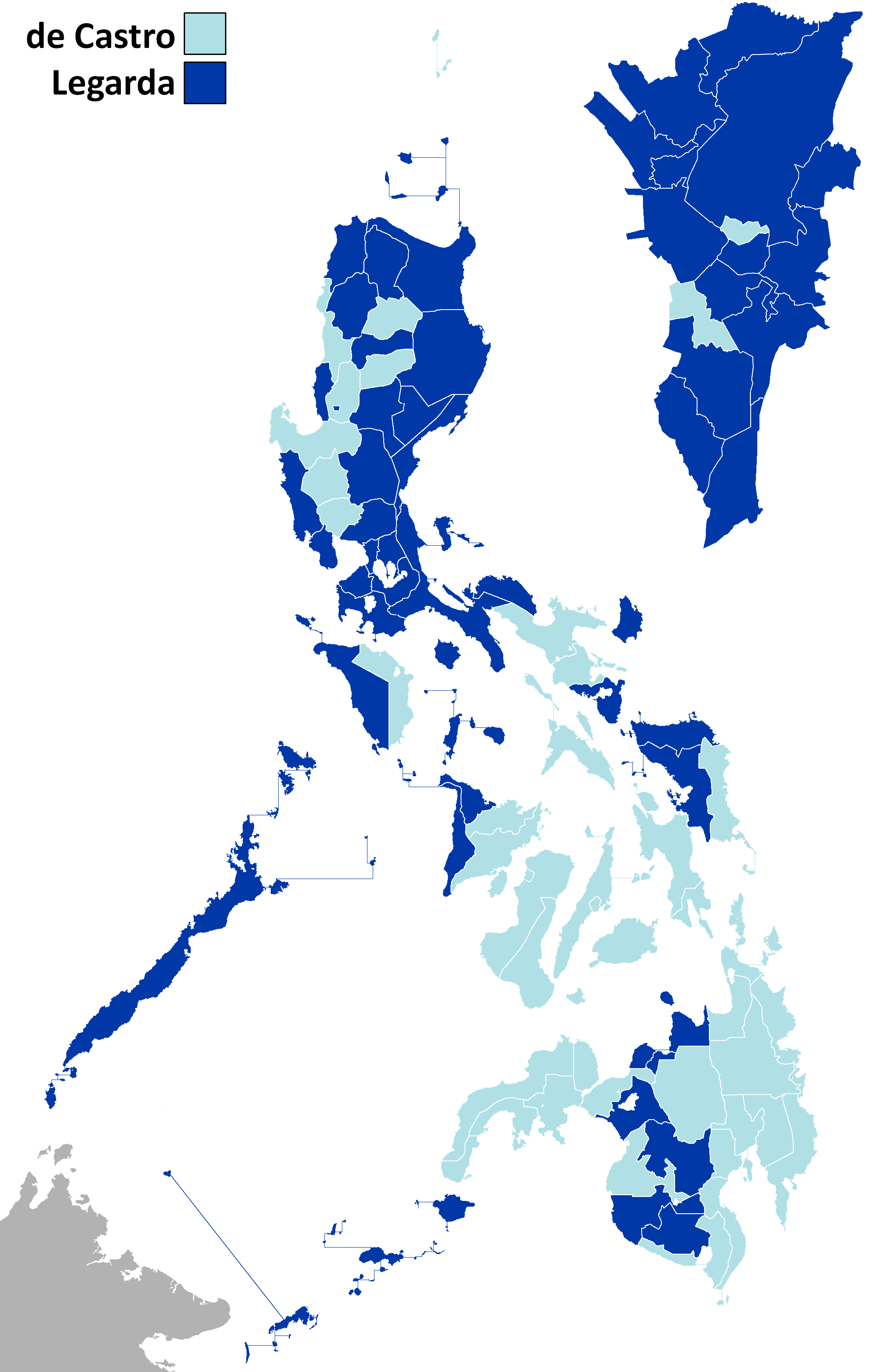
Vice presidential election results per province/city.

Candidate	Party	Votes	%
Noli de Castro (Note: Running mate of Gloria Macapagal Arroyo (Lakas–CMD))	Independent	15,100,431	49.80
Loren Legarda	Koalisyon ng Nagkakaisang Pilipino	14,218,709	46.89
Herminio Aquino	Aksyon Demokratiko	981,500	3.24
Rodolfo Pajo (Note: Running mate of Eddie Gil (Partido Isang Bansa, Isang Diwa) who was disqualified)	Partido Isang Bansa, Isang Diwa	22,244	0.07
Total		30,322,884	100.00
Valid votes		30,322,884	90.49
Invalid/blank votes		3,187,208	9.51
Total votes		33,510,092	100.00
Registered voters/turnout		43,895,324	76.34

Popular vote
De Castro	49.80%
Legarda	46.90%
Others	3.30%

==== Legarda v. De Castro electoral protest ====
On January 18, 2008, in a 21-page resolution, penned by Senior Justice Leonardo Quisumbing, the Supreme Court of the Philippines, acting as the Presidential Electoral Tribunal (PET), dismissed Sen. Loren Legarda's electoral protest against Noli de Castro. 3 reasons supported the judgment: first, the PET approved the recommendation of Hearing Commissioner and former Commission on Elections (Comelec) Chair retired SC Justice Bernardo P. Pardo that "the pilot-tested revision of ballots or re-tabulation of the certificates of canvass would not affect the winning margin of the protestee in the final canvass of the returns, in addition to the ground of abandonment or withdrawal by reason of Protestant’s candidacy for, election and assumption of the office Senator of the Philippines;" second, Legarda's failure to pay the P 3.9 million ($1 = P 40) revision of ballots (in 124,404 precincts) fee despite court extension under Rule 33 of the PET; and third, jurisprudence of Defensor Santiago v. Ramos, teaches that Legarda "effectively abandoned or withdrawn her protest when she ran in the Senate, which term coincides with the term of the Vice-Presidency 2004-2010." Meanwhile, Noli De Castro on television stated: "This is the triumph of truth. The truth that I won fair and square. I thank the Supreme Court for echoing the true voice of the people. From the very beginning I was confident that I received the overwhelming mandate of our people as Vice President." Legarda stated that she will file a motion for reconsideration in due course.

=== Exit polls ===
During and immediately after the elections, exit polls were conducted by various organizations including the Social Weather Stations. According to "The SWS 2004 Day of Election Survey: Final Exit Poll Scores Excluding Blank Answers", released by the SWS on May 19, 2004, the national vote percentages are: GMA 45%, FPJ 34%, Lacson 10%, Roco 6%, Villanueva 5% (slightly different numbers from May 11; error margin 2%, n = 4,445)."

These results are affirmed when compared to the NAMFREL Quick Count as of May 21, as tabulated in "Comparison of ABS-CBN/SWS Exit Poll 2004 Results (as of May 17, 9 am; excluding No Answer) and NAMFREL Quick Count as of May 21 1:00 p.m. (Report #63)". The NAMFREL Quick Count shows GMA at 40.4%, FPJ at 36.5%, Lacson at 10.8%, Roco at 6.2%, and Villanueva at 6.1%.

It is notable in light of the subsequent Hello Garci scandal how exit polling revealed the candidates' performance in the Autonomous Region in Muslim Mindanao. To wit, the SWS exit poll shows that GMA won only 44% of ARMM while FPJ won 50% (in short, 44–50); the NAMFREL Quick Count showed a score of 34.3-56.5. However, the final official COMELEC Canvass showed a result of 62% vs. 31% in favor of Gloria Macapagal Arroyo.

The SWS also published the number of registered voters per region as of April 28, 2004—or just a week before the elections—for the purpose of comparing their sample sizes with the actual number of voters. The ARMM had 1,057,458 voters.

However, recall that in the final official COMELEC canvass, FPJ won 31% of ARMM votes. If he had won 100% of ARMM, he could gain only 69% more of the ARMM voters, or 729,646 votes. Given that the final difference between GMA and FPJ was 1,123,576 votes, GMA would still have won the election by a total of 393,930 votes.

This result is actually consistent with the trend of the pre-election opinion polls conducted also by the SWS. On April 23, just a little over two weeks before the election, the SWS released a poll, and the headline of the SWS report by itself was historically significant: "SWS April 10–17, 2004 Survey: Roco Depleted, Voters Go To GMA and Undecided". The report's first line gives away the game: "Raul Roco's sudden departure for abroad cost him almost half of his voting strength, allowing Gloria Macapagal Arroyo to gain a slim lead ..." That lead could not be reversed: at the last pre-election SWS opinion poll (conducted from May 1 to 4) released on May 8, 2004, or just two days before the election, "GMA Leads FPJ By 7%", 37% to 30%, with 12% undecided.

=== Voter demographics ===
2004 Presidential vote by demographic subgroup
Demographic subgroup	Arroyo	Poe	Lacson	Roco	Villanueva	% of total vote
Total vote	45	34	10	6	5	100
Region
NCR	34	25	21	9	11	11
CAR	51	24	13	3	8	2
Region I - Ilocos	35	49	10	2	4	6
Region II - Cagayan Valley	35	44	13	1	6	5
Region III - Central Luzon	35	47	8	3	7	9
Region IV - Southern Tagalog	26	48	16	4	7	14
Region V - Bicol	28	27	4	37	4	6
Region VI - Western Visayas	66	21	4	4	5	8
Region VII - Central Visayas	78	13	4	4	1	8
Region VIII - Eastern Visayas	51	40	1	5	6	6
Region IX - Western Mindanao	48	41	5	1	6	4
Region X - Northern Mindanao	54	34	6	3	3	3
Region XI - Southern Mindanao	50	40	5	2	4	5
Region XII - Central Mindanao	48	38	9	2	3	4
ARMM	44	50	3	2	1	4
Caraga	74	17	2	1	6	4

Source: Exit polls conducted by Social Weather Stations on May 11, 99% total due to rounding error (margin of error: 2%)

=== Official Congressional canvass ===
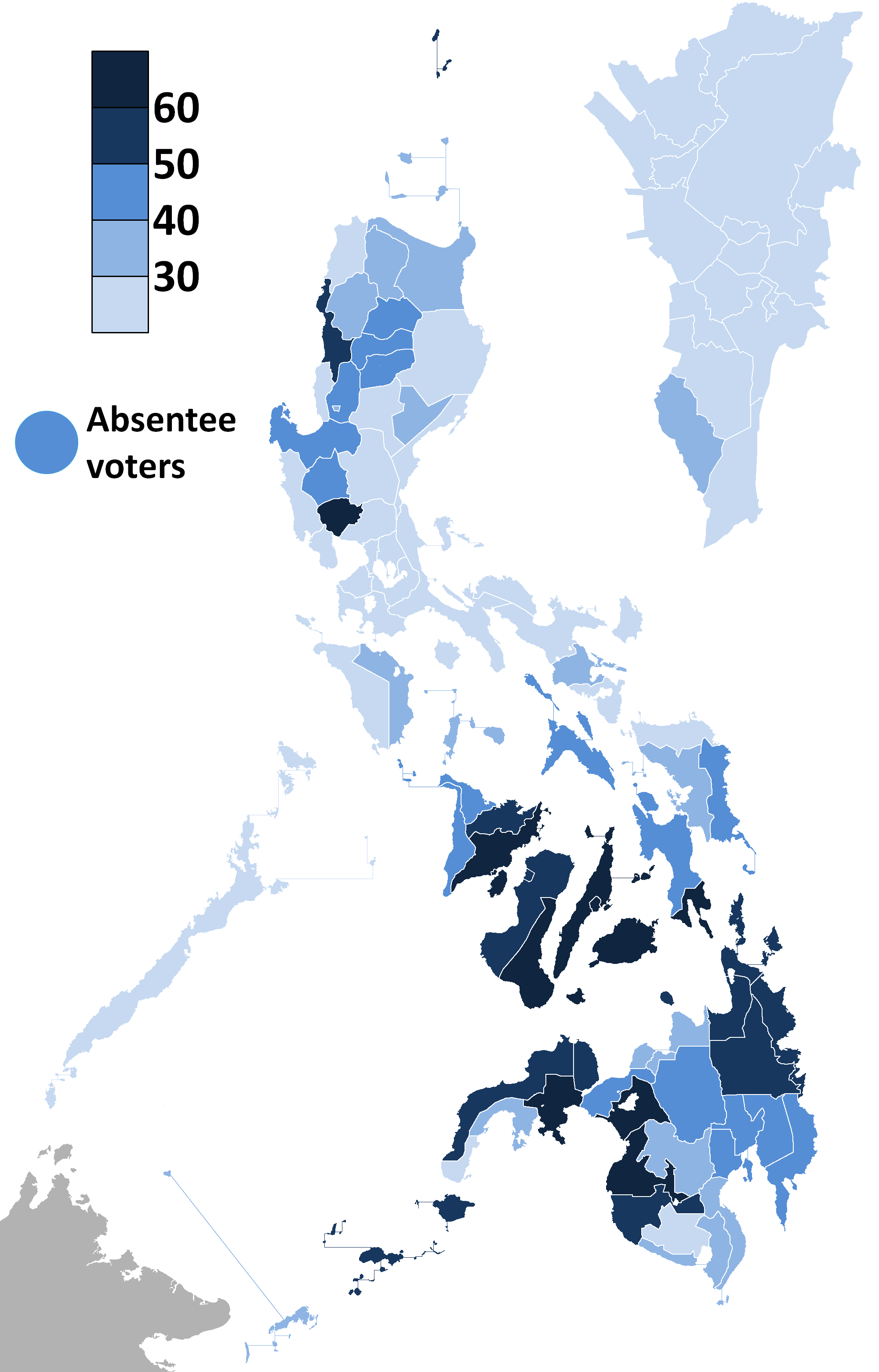
Arroyo

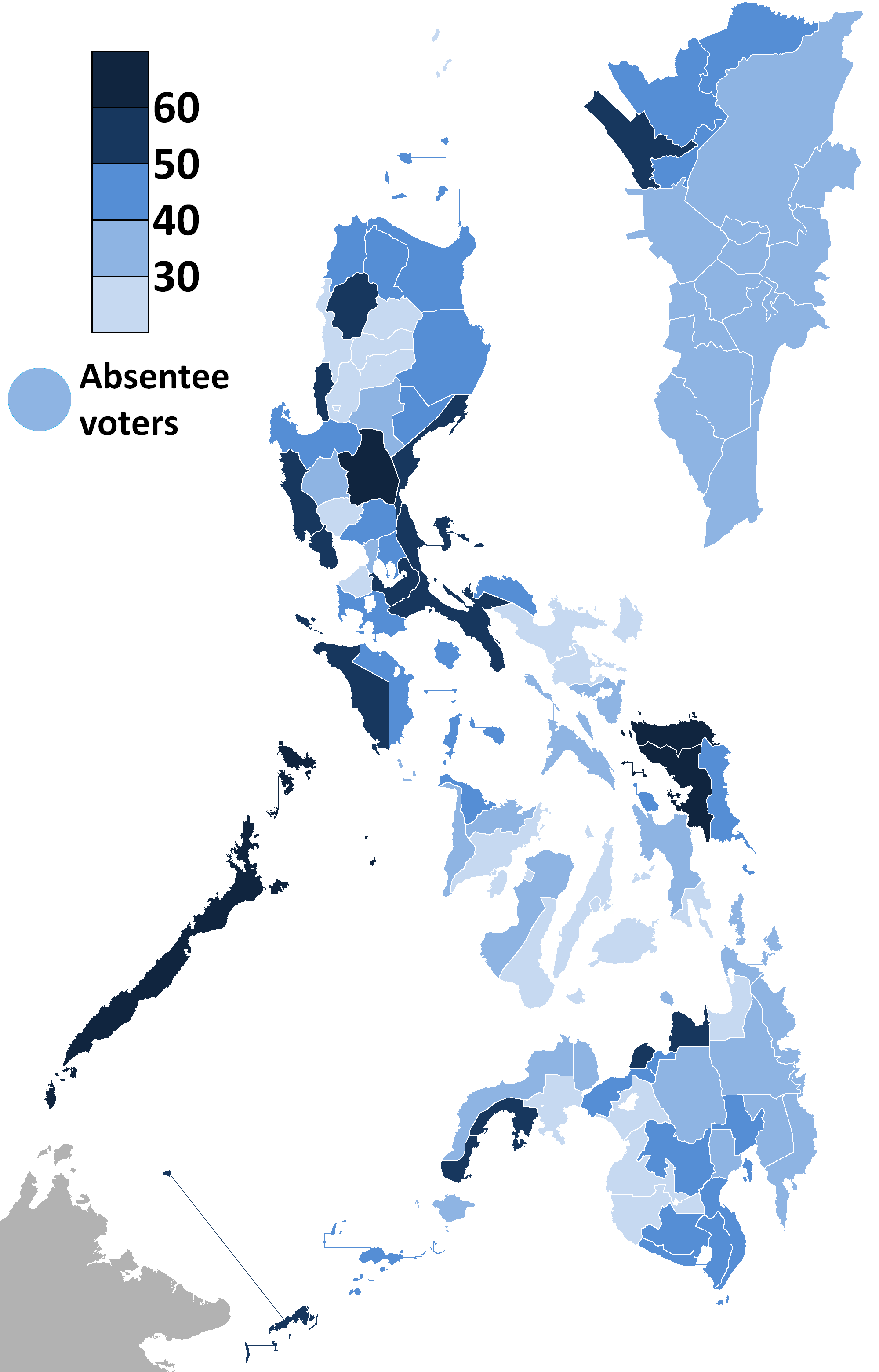
Poe

Arroyo won in Western and Central Visayas, western parts of northern Luzon, northern Mindanao and in the Autonomous Region in Muslim Mindanao. Poe, on the other hand, won in Eastern Visayas, Metro Manila, southern Luzon, eastern parts of Northern Luzon and southern Mindanao. Arroyo is the first candidate to win the presidency despite losing the Lingayen-Lucena corridor.

Under the constitution, the Congress is mandated to become the National Board of Canvassers for the top two positions, the president and the vice-president. Tallying in the 216,382 precincts nationwide are submitted in Election Returns that are forwarded to the municipal and city board of canvassers. These are then tabulated and forwarded to the provincial board of canvassers which prepare the 176 Certificates of Canvass (CoC). These CoCs were forwarded to the joint session of the Congress at the Batasang Pambansa in Quezon City in May 2004.

Senators and representatives from the administration and opposition have debated heatedly on the procedure of counting the CoCs. The traditional way of counting the certificates, as used in the 1992 and 1998 elections, was to appoint a joint committee consisting of seven senators and seven representatives. Many opposition legislators, notably, Cong. Digs Dilangalen of Maguindanao, opposed this traditional method as unconstitutional saying that it should be the whole Congress, not a committee, who should count the votes. Part of the argument was that "power delegated cannot be further delegated", referring to the delegation of counting to a committee. The proposal of some legislators was for the whole Congress to sit in a joint session counting each and every single Certificate of Canvass.

The debates and deliberations for the rules of canvassing were finished by the Congressional joint session on May 28. The rules decided were very similar to the ones used in the 1992 and 1998 elections, which called for a joint committee to act as the National Board of Canvassers. The notable difference is the increase of the number of committee members from 14 to 22, this time consisting of 11 senators and 11 representatives. The composition of the committee was also announced by the Senate President, Franklin Drilon, and the Speaker of the House, Jose de Venecia. The composition was immediately lambasted by the Opposition; the House portion of the committee consisted of 9 administration representatives and 2 opposition. The Poe camp called for a more equal representation for all the involved political parties in the committee, despite the appointed commission mirroring the current composition of the House: there are 190 administration representatives in a 220-seat House.

The official canvassing by the Congressional Joint Committee started on June 4, a little less than one month after election day. Canvassing was done in a slow pace, averaging about 12 Certificates of Canvass per day, as the Opposition accused Administration politicians of railroading the canvass. The Opposition lawyers wanted to question the validity of 25 CoCs, especially in those areas where Arroyo posted a wide margin over Poe. They wanted the committee to examine the Statement of Votes at the municipal level and even down to the Election Returns at the precinct level to prove their claim that the Certificates of Canvass have been tampered with in favor of Arroyo. Administration lawyers contend that the committee is not the proper place to lodge complaints of fraud and that the Opposition should go to the Presidential Election Tribunal (the Supreme Court) after the winner has been proclaimed.

== See also ==
- Hello Garci scandal
- Commission on Elections
- Politics of the Philippines
- Philippine elections
- President of the Philippines
- 13th Congress of the Philippines
