= Koalisyon ng Katapatan at Karanasan sa Kinabukasan =

Political alliance supporting Gloria Macapagal Arroyo from 2003 to 2004

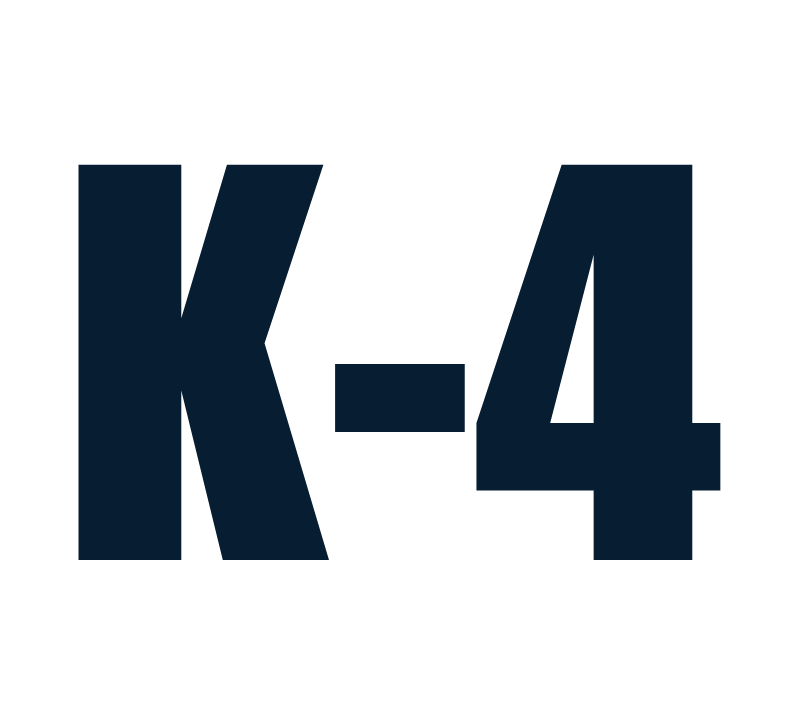
- President: Franklin M. Drilon
- Chairperson: Vacant
- Secretary-General: Vacant
- Founders: Gloria Macapagal Arroyo
- Founded: 2003
- Dissolved: 2004
- Preceded by: People Power Coalition
- Succeeded by: TEAM Unity
- Ideology: Big tent
- Political position: Centre
- Coalition members: Lakas; Liberal; NPC (Yap wing); Nacionalista; PRP; PDSP; KAMPI

The Koalisyon ng Katapatan at Karanasan sa Kinabukasan also known as K4 or K-4, (lit. 'Coalition of Trust and Experience for Tomorrow') was the political multi-party electoral alliance that supported president Gloria Macapagal Arroyo's presidential campaign for a full term in 2004, who won. It is the remnant of the People Power Coalition (PPC) that was formed following the ascendancy of President Arroyo to power. She selected Senator Noli de Castro, an independent yet popular politician and broadcaster, as her running mate.

== History ==
=== People Power Coalition fallout ===
In December 2003, People Power Coalition (PPC) was totally dissolved, as Aksyon, Partido Reporma, and PROMDI left the PPC in November.

=== Formation ===
By December 2003, the administration's camp began talking and negotiating with Aksyon and Liberal, with only the latter joining the camp. Later, People's Reform Party, led by former Senator Miriam Defensor Santiago joined. Former basketball superstar and incumbent Senator Robert Jaworski and former Defense Secretary Orly Mercado both joined Lakas. Santiago and Jaworski are notable for voting against opening of evidence during the last days of the impeachment trial of then-President Joseph Estrada.

The administration camp defended the inclusion of the opposition senators, stating that some opposition politicians joined with them for a shared ideal of good governance, notwithstanding their past differences.

=== Biazon joined ===
On December 29, 2003, Rodolfo Biazon joined Liberal with his son. The former joined Aksyon before joining Liberal. Biazon notably left Laban ng Demokratikong Pilipino (LDP) due to party division between his Senate colleagues: party leader Edgardo Angara and aspiring party nominee Panfilo Lacson.

== Composition ==
The leading party in this coalition is the ruling Lakas, of which Arroyo is a member. Other parties under this coalition are the Liberal Party (Liberal), the Nationalist People's Coalition, the Nacionalista Party (Nacionalista), the Partido Demokratiko Sosyalista ng Pilipinas, the People's Reform Party (PRP), and the Kabalikat ng Mamamayang Pilipino (KAMPI).

== K-4 Senatorial Slate ==
Name	Party	Occupation	Elected
Robert Barbers	Lakas	Senator, former Secretary of the Interior and Local Government.	No
Rodolfo Biazon	Liberal	Senator, former Chief of Staff of the Armed Forces of the Philippines.	Yes
Pia Cayetano	Lakas	Lawyer, environmentalist, and eldest daughter of the late senator Renato Cayetano (1998–2003).	Yes
Dick Gordon	Lakas	former Secretary of Tourism and former chairman of the Subic Bay Metropolitan Authority.	Yes
Parouk Hussin	Lakas	Medical doctor, former governor of the Autonomous Region in Muslim Mindanao.	No
Robert Jaworski	Lakas	Senator, former athlete.	No
Lito Lapid	Lakas	Governor of Pampanga, movie and TV personality.	Yes
Orly Mercado	Lakas	former Secretary of National Defense and former Senator	No
John Henry Osmeña	NPC	Senator	No
Mar Roxas	Liberal	former Secretary of Trade and Industry and former representative from Capiz. He is the grandson of former president Manuel Roxas, second son of former senator Gerardo Roxas, and brother of former representative Dinggoy Roxas Jr.	Yes
Bong Revilla	Lakas	former chairman of the Videogram Regulatory Board (anti-media piracy arm of the government), former governor of Cavite, movie and TV personality.	Yes
Miriam Defensor Santiago	PRP	former senator, PRP 1992 and 1998 presidential nominee (lost to Fidel Ramos and Joseph Estrada respectively).	Yes

== Election results ==
7 candidates won out of the possible 12 seats in the Senate. In order of votes received, these are:

- Mar Roxas
- Bong Revilla
- Dick Gordon
- Pia Cayetano
- Miriam Defensor Santiago
- Lito Lapid
- Rodolfo Biazon

== See also ==
- Gloria Macapagal Arroyo 2004 presidential campaign
- Koalisyon ng Nagkakaisang Pilipino (Coalition of United Filipinos), the K4's rival coalition in the 2004 national elections.
- TEAM Unity, the Arroyo administration's electoral alliance in the 2007 midterm elections.
- People Power Coalition, the pro-Arroyo coalition in the 2001 midterm elections, the predecessor of K-4.
- Lakas 1998 Senatorial Slate, the pro-administration senatorial slate in the 1998 national elections.
- Lakas–Laban Coalition, the name of the pro-Ramos coalition in the 1995 midterm elections.
