= 2004 Philippine House of Representatives elections =

20th Philippine House of Representatives elections

- May 10, 2004

All 261 seats in the House of Representatives (including underhangs) 131 seats needed for a majority
- Congressional district elections
- All 209 seats from congressional districts
Party	Seats	+/–
Lakas	92	+13
NPC	53	+11
Liberal	29	+10
LDP	15	−6
PMP	5	+1
Aksyon	2	0
KAMPI	2	+1
Nacionalista	2	+2
PDP–Laban	2	0
KBL	1	0
PDSP	1	0
Reporma	1	−1
Independent	4	−4
This lists parties that won seats. See the complete results below.
- Party-list election
- All 52 seats under the party-list system
Party	Vote %	Seats	+/–
Bayan Muna	9.46	3	0
APEC	7.35	3	0
Akbayan	6.70	3	+1
Buhay	5.55	2	+1
Anakpawis	4.23	2	+1
CIBAC	3.89	2	+1
Gabriela	3.65	2	+1
PM	3.52	2	+1
Butil	3.37	2	+1
AVE	2.70	1	+1
Alagad	2.68	1	+1
VFP	2.68	1	+1
Coop-NATCCO	2.13	1	+1
Anak Mindanao	2.12	1	0
ALIF	2.12	1	+1
An Waray	2.11	1	+1
This lists parties that won seats. See the complete results below.
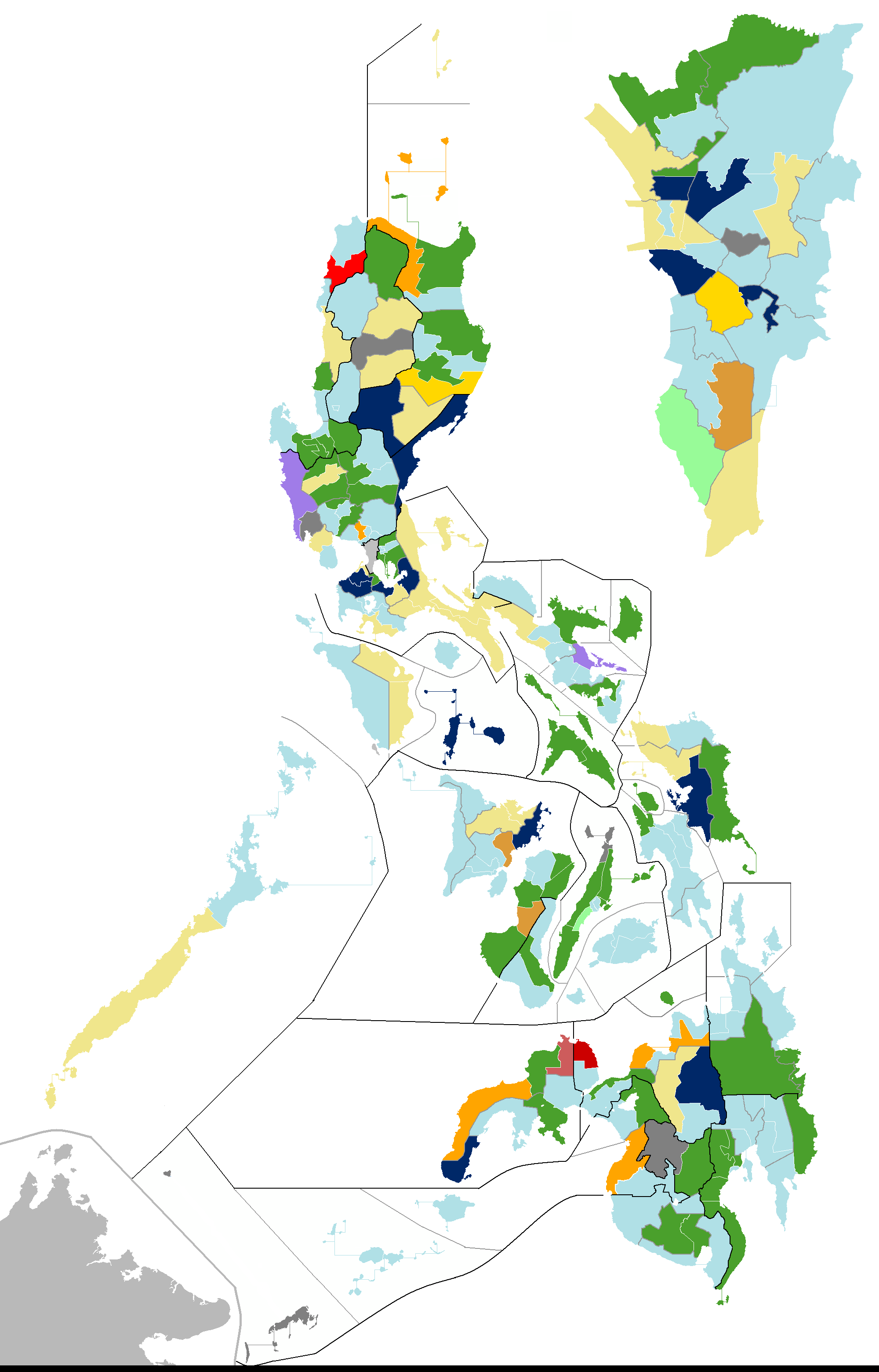
Speaker before	Speaker after
Jose de Venecia Jr. Lakas	Jose de Venecia Jr. Lakas

Elections for the House of Representatives of the Philippines were held on May 10, 2004. Being held together with presidential election, the party of the incumbent president Gloria Macapagal Arroyo, Lakas-Christian Muslim Democrats, and by extension the administration-led coalition, the Koalisyon ng Katapatan at Karanasan sa Kinabukasan (K4), won majority of the seats in the House of Representatives.

The elected representatives served in the 13th Congress from 2004 to 2007.

== Electoral system ==
The House of Representatives shall have not more than 250 members, unless otherwise fixed by law, of which 20% shall be elected via the party-list system, while the rest are elected via congressional districts.

In this election, there are 209 seats voted via first-past-the-post in single-member districts. Each province, and a city with a population of 250,000, is guaranteed a seat, with more populous provinces and cities divided into two or more districts.

Congress has the power of redistricting three years after each census.

As there are 209 congressional districts, there shall be 52 seats available under the party-list system. A party has to cross the 2% electoral threshold to win a guaranteed seat. Next, the court ruled that the first-placed party should always have more seats than the other parties, and that the prior 2%–4%–6% method will only be used for the first-placed party. As for parties that got 2% of the vote but did not have the most votes, they will automatically have one more seat, then any extra seats will be determined via dividing their votes to the number of votes of the party with the most votes, then the quotient will be multiplied by the number of seats the party with the most votes has. The product, disregarding decimals (it is not rounded), will be the number of seats a party will get.

== Redistricting ==
Reapportioning (redistricting) the number of seats is either via national reapportionment three years after the release of every census, or via piecemeal redistricting for every province or city. National reapportionment has not happened since the 1987 constitution took effect, and aside from piecemeal redistricting, the apportionment was based on the ordinance from the constitution, which was in turn based from the 1980 census.

Three new districts were created, all within Metro Manila and its bordering cities.

=== Changes from the outgoing Congress ===
- Division of Parañaque's at-large congressional district to two districts
  - Parañaque's western barangays becomes the 1st district.
  - The eastern barangays becomes the 2nd district.
  - Enacted into law as Republic Act No. 9229.
- Division of Bulacan's 4th congressional district to two districts
  - San Jose del Monte becomes its own at-large district.
  - The rest of the 4th district was left intact.
  - Enacted into law as Republic Act No. 9320.
- Division of Antipolo's at-large congressional district to two districts
  - Antipolo's western barangays becomes the 1st district.
  - The rest of the city becomes the 2nd district.
  - Enacted into law as Republic Act No. 9232.

== Results ==
=== District elections ===
Party	Seats	+/–
Lakas–CMD	92	+13
Nationalist People's Coalition	53	+11
Liberal Party	29	+10
Laban ng Demokratikong Pilipino	15	−6
Pwersa ng Masang Pilipino	5	+1
Aksyon Demokratiko	2	0
Kabalikat ng Malayang Pilipino	2	+1
Nacionalista Party	2	New
PDP–Laban	2	0
Kilusang Bagong Lipunan	1	0
Partido Demokratiko Sosyalista ng Pilipinas	1	0
Partido para sa Demokratikong Reporma	1	−1
Independent	4	−4
Party-list seats (Note: Only 28 were seated in the party-list election.)	52	0
Total	261	0

=== Party-list election ===
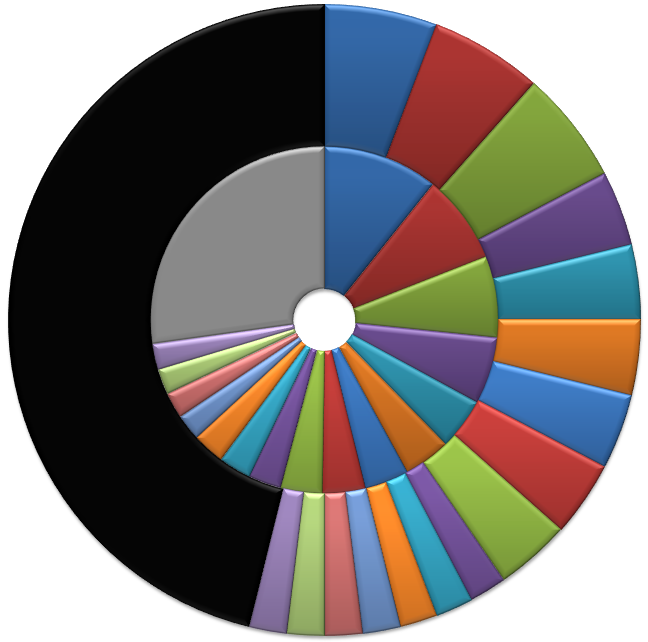
Result of the Philippine House of Representatives party-list election. Proportion of votes (inner ring) as compared to proportion of seats (outer ring) of the political parties. Parties that did not win any seat are represented by a gray pie slice, unfilled seats due to the 3-seat cap and 2% threshold are denoted by a black slice.

Party	Votes	%	+/–	Seats	+/–
Bayan Muna	1,203,305	9.46	−1.84	3	0
Association of Philippine Electric Cooperatives	934,995	7.35	+2.04	3	0
Akbayan	852,473	6.70	+4.20	3	+1
Buhay Hayaan Yumabong	705,730	5.55	+3.63	2	+1
Anakpawis	538,396	4.23	+4.23	2	+1
Citizens' Battle Against Corruption	495,193	3.89	+1.75	2	+1
Gabriela Women's Party	464,586	3.65	New	2	+1
Partido ng Manggagawa	448,072	3.52	+2.09	2	+1
Butil Farmers Party	429,259	3.37	+1.19	2	+1
Alliance of Volunteer Educators	343,498	2.70	New	1	New
Alagad	340,977	2.68	+1.91	1	New
Veterans Freedom Party	340,759	2.68	−1.16	1	+1
Cooperative NATCCO Network Party	270,950	2.13	+0.63	1	New
Anak Mindanao	269,750	2.12	+0.43	1	0
Ang Laban ng Indiginong Filipino	269,345	2.12	New	1	New
An Waray	268,164	2.11	New	1	New
Alyansang Bayanihan ng mga Magsasaka Mangagawang Bukid at Mangingisda and Adhikain at Kilusan ng Ordinaryong Tao	251,597	1.98	New	0	–
Alliance for Nationalism and Democracy	244,137	1.92	New	0	–
Senior Citizens/Elderly	236,571	1.86	New	0	–
Philippines Guardians Brotherhood	213,662	1.68	New	0	–
Ang Nagkakaisang Kabataan para sa Sambayanan	213,068	1.67	New	0	–
Trade Union Congress Party	201,396	1.58	New	0	–
Sanlakas	189,517	1.49	+0.49	0	−1
Bigkis Pinoy Movement	186,264	1.46	+0.43	0	–
Suara Bangsamoro	164,494	1.29	New	0	–
Philippine Coconut Producers Federation	163,952	1.29	−0.23	0	−1
Sagip-Kapwa Foundation	161,797	1.27	New	0	–
Aksyon Sambayan	156,467	1.23	New	0	–
People's Movement Against Poverty	144,740	1.14	New	0	–
Barangay Association for National Advancement and Transparency	143,454	1.13	New	0	–
Abay Pamiliya Foundation	133,952	1.05	+0.98	0	–
Samahan ng mga Mangangakal para sa Ikauunlad ng Lokal na Ekonomiya	133,425	1.05	New	0	–
Abanse! Pinay	115,855	0.91	+0.02	0	−1
Migrante Sectoral Party of Overseas Filipinos and their Families	110,507	0.87	New	0	–
Alab Katipunan	92,262	0.73	New	0	–
Assalam Bangsamoro People's Party	91,975	0.72	New	0	–
Gabay ng Manggagawang Pilipino Party	89,978	0.71	+0.59	0	–
Alyansa ng may Kapansanang Pinoy	86,673	0.68	New	0	–
Pinoy Overseas	79,214	0.62	New	0	–
Ahonbayan	68,203	0.54	+0.35	0	–
Advocates and Adherents of Social Justice for School Teachers and Allied Workers	65,596	0.52	New	0	–
Seaman's Party	65,231	0.51	+0.01	0	–
Bahandi sa Kaumahan ug Kadagatan	61,665	0.48	New	0	–
National Federation of Small Coconut Farmers Organization	55,378	0.44	New	0	–
Bagong Tao Movement	52,919	0.42	New	0	–
Alyansa ng Sambayanan para sa Pagbabago	50,063	0.39	New	0	–
Maritime Party	48,037	0.38	−0.27	0	–
Visayas Farmers Party	42,920	0.34	New	0	–
The True Marcos Loyalist (For God Country and People)	42,050	0.33	−0.81	0	–
Mindanao Federation of Small Coconut Farmers Organization	39,194	0.31	New	0	–
Philippine Confederation of Drivers Organization and Alliance of Concerned Transport Operators	38,093	0.30	New	0	–
Organisasyon ng Manggagawang Mag-aangat sa Republika	38,389	0.30	New	0	–
Confederation of Grains Retailers Association of the Philippines	33,950	0.27	New	0	–
Lapiang Manggagawa	31,386	0.25	New	0	–
Philippine Association of Retired Persons	30,984	0.24	New	0	–
Farmers and Fisherfolks Aggrupation of the Philippines	28,739	0.23	New	0	–
Aging Pilipino Organization	27,609	0.22	New	0	–
Kaisang Loob para sa Marangal na Paninirahan	26,392	0.21	New	0	–
Partido Katutubo Pilipino	22,370	0.18	New	0	–
Partido Isang Bansa, Isang Diwa	17,994	0.14	New	0	–
Visayan Association of the Philippines	13,340	0.10	New	0	–
Novelty Entrepreneurship & Livelihood for Food	13,266	0.10	New	0	–
Tribal Association of the Philippines	8,753	0.07	New	0	–
Federation of Land Reform Farmers of the Philippines	8,660	0.07	New	0	–
Sandigang Maralita	7,992	0.06	−0.01	0	–
Democratic Workers of the Philippines	3,900	0.03	−0.01	0	–
Total	12,723,482	100.00	–	28	+11
Valid votes	12,723,482	35.83	+13.70		
Invalid/blank votes	22,786,610	64.17	−13.70		
Total votes	35,510,092	100.00	–		
Registered voters/turnout	44,872,007	79.14	−2.12		
Source: COMELEC

== See also ==
- 13th Congress of the Philippines

== Bibliography ==
- Paras, Corazon L. (2000). The Presidents of the Senate of the Republic of the Philippines. Giraffe Books. ISBN 971-8832-24-6.
- Pobre, Cesar P. (2000). Philippine Legislature 100 Years. Philippine Historical Association. ISBN 971-92245-0-9.
