= 2004 Philippine general election =

- May 10, 2004
- Registered: 43,895,324
- Turnout: 33,510,092
- 2004 Philippine presidential election
- May 10, 2004
- Turnout: 76.3% ▼10.2%
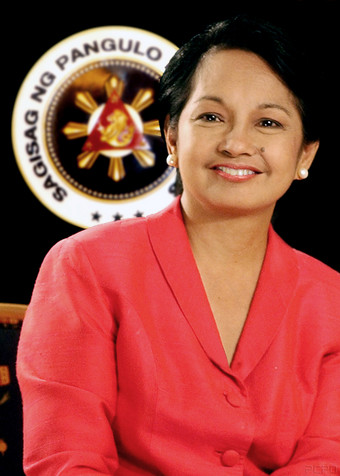

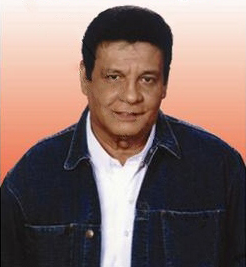

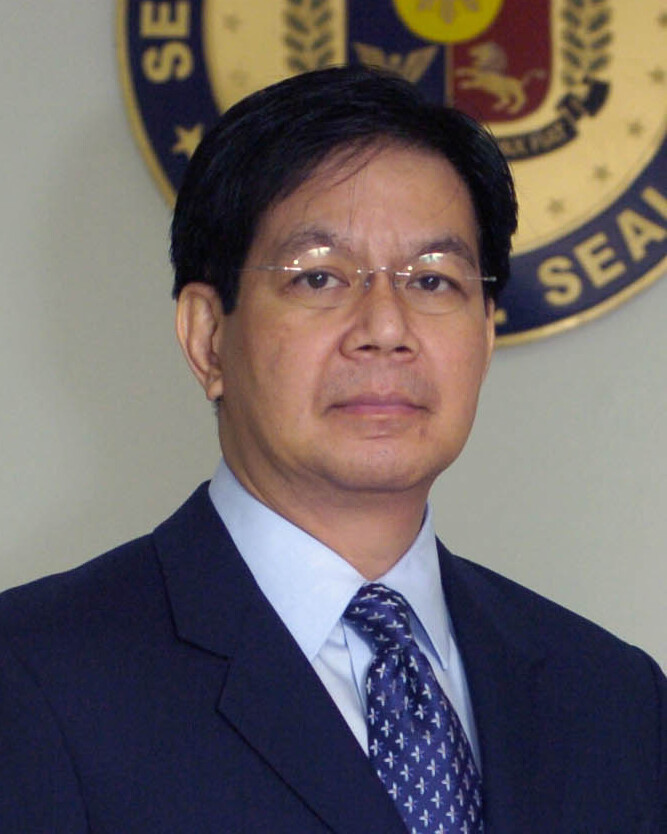
Nominee	Gloria Macapagal Arroyo	Fernando Poe Jr.	Panfilo Lacson
Party	Lakas	KNP	LDP (Aquino wing)
Running mate	Noli de Castro	Loren Legarda	N/A
Popular vote	12,905,808	11,782,232	3,510,080
Percentage	39.99%	36.51%	10.88%
President before election
Gloria Macapagal Arroyo
Lakas
Elected President
Gloria Macapagal Arroyo
Lakas
- 2004 Philippine vice presidential election
- May 10, 2004
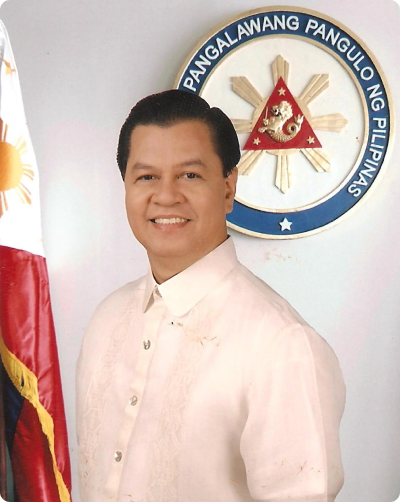

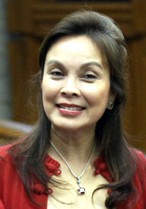
Candidate	Noli de Castro	Loren Legarda
Party	Independent	KNP
Popular vote	15,100,431	14,218,709
Percentage	49.80%	46.89%
Vice President before election
Teofisto Guingona Jr.
Independent
Elected Vice President
Noli de Castro
Independent
- 2004 Philippine Senate election
- May 10, 2004

12 (of the 24) seats in the Senate 13 seats needed for a majority
Alliance	K4	KNP
Seats won	7	5
Popular vote	132,793,971	95,953,367
Percentage	52.24	37.74
Senate President before election
Franklin Drilon
Liberal
Elected Senate President
Franklin Drilon
Liberal
- 2004 Philippine House of Representatives elections
- May 10, 2004
- All 261 seats in the House of Representatives (including underhangs); 131 seats needed for a majority
Party	Seats	+/–
Lakas	92	+13
NPC	53	+11
Liberal	29	+10
LDP	15	−6
Others	20	−1
Party-list	28	+12
This lists parties that won seats. See the complete results below.
Speaker before	Speaker after
Jose de Venecia Jr. Lakas	Jose de Venecia Jr. Lakas

Presidential elections, legislative elections and local elections were held in the Philippines on May 10, 2004. In the presidential election, incumbent president Gloria Macapagal Arroyo won a full six-year term as president, with a margin of just over one million votes over her leading opponent, highly popular movie actor Fernando Poe Jr.

The elections were notable for several reasons. This election first saw the implementation of the Overseas Absentee Voting Act of 2003 (see Wikisource), which enabled Filipinos in over 70 countries to vote. This is also the first election since the 1986 People Power Revolution where an incumbent president ran in the presidential election. Under the 1987 Constitution, an elected president cannot run for another term. However, Arroyo was not elected president, but instead succeeded ousted President Joseph Estrada, who was earlier impeached with charges of plunder and corruption in 2000 and later convicted on the plunder charge but received conditional pardon from Arroyo.

Moreover, this was the first time since 1986 that both the winning president and vice president were under the same party/coalition. This election was also held at a period in modern Philippines marked by serious political polarization. This resulted in lesser candidates for the presidential and vice presidential elections compared to the 1992 and 1998 elections.

== Background ==
The political climate leading up to the 2004 elections was one of the most emotional in the country's history since the 1986 elections that resulted in the exile of Ferdinand Marcos. Philippine society has become polarized between the followers of former president Joseph Estrada who have thrown their support for Estrada's close associate Fernando Poe Jr. and those who support incumbent Gloria Macapagal Arroyo, or at best oppose Estrada.

The several months leading to the May elections saw several presidential scandals, Arroyo reversing her earlier decision not to run for president, the sudden but not unexpected candidacy of Fernando Poe Jr., defection of key political figures from the Arroyo camp to the opposition, the controversial automated elections initiative of the COMELEC, and the split of the dominant opposition party, Laban ng Demokratikong Pilipino, between Poe and Panfilo Lacson.

=== Gloria Macapagal Arroyo's candidacy ===
On a speech given on Rizal Day, December 30, 2002, Gloria Macapagal Arroyo declared that she would not run in the 2004 elections. Arroyo claimed that withdrawing from the race would relieve her of the burden of politics and allow her administration to devote the last year and half to the following:

First, strengthening the economy to create more jobs and to encourage business activities that are unhampered by corruption and red tape in government.

Second, healing the deep divisions within Philippine society.

Third, working for clean and honest elections in 2004.

This was hailed as a welcome development by many people, especially those in the business and economic sectors. Nine months later, on October 4, 2003, Arroyo completely changed her mind. Arroyo stated that her change of heart was for a higher cause and that she cannot ignore the call to further serve the country. Many people, especially those who held on to her commitment, were dismayed by her turnabout, though most were unsurprised since there had been clues months before that she would probably not stand by her earlier decision. Others welcomed this development, saying that she needs more time to implement her projects, and that she would be the strongest contender against a likely candidacy by Fernando Poe Jr.

=== Fernando Poe, Jr.'s candidacy ===
Months before the elections, members of the opposition have been encouraging Fernando Poe Jr., a close friend of former president Joseph Estrada to run for president. Poe was very popular with the masses and it was widely believed that he would be a sure winner if he ran for president.

On November 27, 2003, Poe ended months of speculation by announcing that he will run for president during a press conference held at the Manila Hotel.

However, on January 9, 2004, Victorino X. Fornier (a private citizen) filed a case against Poe and the COMELEC, saying that Poe wasn't eligible to run for he is not a natural-born Filipino before the COMELEC. On January 23, the COMELEC dismissed the petition for lack of merit. On February 10, Fornier finally filed the case to the Supreme Court, seeking Poe to be disqualified from the race. His case was later merged with cases filed by Maria Jeanette C. Tecson, and Felix B. Desiderio Jr., and by Zoilo Antonio G. Velez.

Death of Lawyer Maria Jeanette Tecson

On September 28, 2007, 8:30 p.m, Senior Superintendent Francisco Uyami, Pasig police chief stated that Lawyer Maria Tecson, 40, was found dead (in a state of rigor mortis) inside room 204 at the Richmond Hotel, San Miguel Avenue, Pasig (with her throat slit and with cuts on her wrist). Maria Jeanette Tecson, Zoilo Velez (promoted to Court of Appeals Justice) and Victorino Fornier filed the disqualification case against Fernando Poe Jr. She claimed Poe was born out of wedlock and that while Poe's birth certificate was dated 1939, his parents Allan Poe and American mother Bessie Kelly did not marry until 1940.

On March 3, the Supreme Court, said in its decision, that for lack of jurisdiction and prematurity, and ruling that Poe's father, Allan F. Poe would have been a Filipino citizen by virtue of the en masse Filipinization enacted by the Philippine Bill of 1902. Also, even if Poe wasn't a natural-born Filipino citizen, he cannot be held guilty of having made a material misrepresentation in his certificate of candidacy.

=== Eddie Villanueva's candidacy ===
The Commission on Elections originally affirmed the candidacies of six people for the president. The sixth person running for president was Bro. Eddie Villanueva, spiritual director of Jesus is Lord Church. The party of Eduardo Villanueva filed a petition with the COMELEC seeking to disqualify Eddie Gil on the basis of him being a nuisance candidate, his incapacity to mount a nationwide campaign, and that because he was running with the aim to confuse voters because of their similar names.

=== The LDP split ===
The Laban ng Demokratikong Pilipino party (LDP) would form the core of the main opposition party, the Koalisyon ng Nagkakaisang Pilipino (KNP). However, members of the party disagreed on which person to support for president. Panfilo Lacson, a member of the party, advanced his candidacy for president but was not considered by Edgardo Angara, the president of the party. Angara supported Fernando Poe Jr. Together with the party's secretary-general Agapito Aquino, Lacson gathered the support of some members of the party and went ahead with his candidacy. The LDP was subsequently polarized between those supporting Angara and Poe, and those for Lacson and Aquino.

By then, Poe and Lacson have both filed their certificates of candidacies. According to the rules of candidacy, every presidential candidate must have a political party to back him or her. With the obvious split within the ranks of the LDP, and with no signs that the two factions would come to an agreement, the COMELEC decided to informally split the party into the Aquino and the Angara wings. Lacson then ran under the LDP – Aquino Wing, and Poe under the LDP – Angara Wing, which would later become the KNP.

During the campaign period, there had been numerous unification talks between the two factions. The opposition saw the need to become united under one banner to boost their chances of winning the presidential election against the organized political machinery of Arroyo. The plans of unification did not materialize due to the stubbornness of both Poe and Lacson. Lacson wanted Poe to concede to him and run as his vice-presidential candidate while the supporters of Poe wanted Lacson to back out from his candidacy and instead support Poe, citing his low performance in the surveys.

=== COMELEC's move for an automated elections ===
Elections in the Philippines have always been a manual process with the results for national positions often being announced more than a month after election day. An attempt to rectify this was done by the Commission on Elections by automating the process of counting the votes. More than 30 billion pesos were spent in acquiring counting machines that were never used in this elections because of numerous controversies and political opposition.

== Timeline ==
2002

- December 30 – President Arroyo declares that she will not run for president in 2004.

2003

- October 4 – President Arroyo announces her intention to run for president.
- November 26 – Fernando Poe Jr. declares his intention to run for president.
- December 29 – Raul Roco, together with Herminiño Lagunzad filed their candidacies for the position of president and vice president. Senator Panfilo Lacson filed his candidacy as president without a running mate.
- December 30 – Fernando, Poe Jr. together with running mate Senator Loren Legarda filed their candidacies for the position of president and vice president.

2004

- January 5 – President Gloria Arroyo and Senator Noli de Castro filed their candidacies for the position of president and vice president.
- January 13 – The Supreme Court nullified a contract for the computerization of the ballot-counting process, effectively forcing the Commission on Elections to revert to the manual counting of votes.
- February 10 – Start of the official campaign period for national positions
- March 3 – Poe was deemed as a natural born Filipino by the Supreme Court, thereby blocking any legal obstacles for his candidacy.
- March 25 – Start of the official campaign period for local positions
- May 10 – Election day
- May 10 – NAMFREL starts its quickcount tally.
- May 14 – Panfilo Lacson resigns from his party, the Laban ng Demokratikong Pilipino (LDP).
- May 14 – Grenade explodes at the General Santos City Hall where canvassing was taking place. No one was hurt.
- May 17 – Opposition groups stage protest at the PICC, site of the official COMELEC canvass for senators and party-list representatives.
- May 17 – Raul Roco concedes to Gloria Macapagal Arroyo.
- May 19 – Fernando Poe Jr., proclaims himself winner in Zamboanga City.
- May 25 – COMELEC proclaims the top 11 senators in its official canvass.
- May 28 – Congress approves the rules for the canvassing of the Certificates of Canvass for the presidential and vice-presidential positions.
- June 2 – The Catholic Bishops Conference of the Philippines issued a statement saying that the elections were generally peaceful and that there was no sign of massive electoral fraud on a nationwide scale.
- June 3 – The 12th senator, Rodolfo Biazon, was proclaimed by the COMELEC.
- June 4 – Congress, through the Joint Committee, starts canvassing the votes for the president and vice-president.
- June 8 – Supreme Court votes 14–0 against the KNP petition to declare the Congressional Joint Committee as the National Board of Canvassers unconstitutional.
- June 20 – The Congressional Joint Committee finishes the canvassing of votes for the president and vice-president; Arroyo is declared the winner.
- June 24 – The Congress approves the report of the Joint Committee officially proclaiming Arroyo the winner.
- June 30 – Gloria Macapagal Arroyo is inaugurated in Cebu City.

== Parties and coalitions ==
This election has seen strong shifts of alliances and new parties as candidates switched allegiances. The two major coalitions seen in this elections were the K-4 (Koalisyon ng Katapatan at Karanasan sa Kinabukasan), of the administration, and the KNP (Koalisyon ng Nagkakaisang Pilipino), the united opposition.

=== Koalisyon ng Katapatan at Karanasan sa Kinabukasan (K-4) ===
The Koalisyon ng Katapatan at Karanasan sa Kinabukasan (Coalition of Truth and Experience for Tomorrow) or K-4, is the remnant of the People Power Coalition that was formed following the ascendancy of president Gloria Macapagal Arroyo to power. Arroyo is seeking a complete term under this coalition with Noli de Castro, an independent, yet popular, broadcaster, as her running mate. The leading party in this coalition is the ruling Lakas-CMD, of which Arroyo is a member. Other parties under this coalition are the Liberal Party, the Nacionalista Party, the Nationalist People's Coalition and the People's Reform Party.

=== Koalisyon ng Nagkakaisang Pilipino (KNP) ===
The Koalisyon ng Nagkakaisang Pilipino (Coalition of United Filipinos), or KNP, is the coalition of the united opposition. Its standard bearers are Fernando Poe Jr. for president and Sen. Loren Legarda for vice-president. The leading parties of this coalition is the Laban ng Demokratikong Pilipino (LDP-Angara Wing), the PDP–Laban and the Pwersa ng Masang Pilipino. the LDP split is caused by stubbornness between Fernando Poe Jr. and Ping Lacson. especially with the support of the former president Joseph Estrada and former first lady Imelda Marcos. The other major party under this coalition is Estrada's Partido ng Masang Pilipino (PMP, Party of the Filipino Masses).

=== Alyansa ng Pag-asa ===
The third major coalition running in this election is the Alyansa ng Pag-asa (Alliance of Hope), This coalition fielded Raul Roco for president and Herminiño Lagunzad Jr for vice-president. The three major parties supporting this coalition are Roco's Aksyon Demokratiko (Democratic Action), former Defense Sec. Renato de Villa's Reporma Party, and Lito Osmeña's Promdi (Probinsya Muna [Provinces First] Development Party). The three parties were the ones that bolted out of the People Power Coalition.

=== Bangon Pilipinas Movement (BPM) ===
The Bangon Pilipinas (Rise up, Philippines) Movement is the political party of Bro. Eddie Villanueva. It consists mostly of volunteers, a majority of whom came from Villanueva's Jesus Is Lord church (Villanueva resigned from the church before submitting his candidacy, to prevent questions on separation of church and state).

=== Laban ng Demokratikong Pilipino (LDP) (Aquino Wing) ===
This was composed of Panfilo Lacson's supporters in the LDP Party.

=== Partido Isang Bansa, Isang Diwa ===
This was Eddie Gil's organization. Gil was deemed a nuisance candidate and was disqualified from the presidential race, however, the party qualified for other positions.

== Candidates ==
=== Administration coalition ===
K4 ticket
For President
Gloria Macapagal Arroyo	Lakas
For Vice President
Noli De Castro	Independent
For Senators
Robert Barbers	Lakas
Rodolfo Biazon	Liberal
Pia Cayetano	Lakas
Dick Gordon	Lakas
Parouk Hussin	Lakas
Robert Jaworski	Lakas
Lito Lapid	Lakas
Orly Mercado	Lakas
John Henry Osmeña	NPC
Mar Roxas	Liberal
Bong Revilla	Lakas
Miriam Defensor Santiago	PRP

=== Primary opposition coalition ===
KNP ticket
For President
Fernando Poe Jr.	KNP
For Vice President
Loren Legarda	KNP
For Senators
Boots Anson-Roa	KNP
Digs Dilangalen	KNP
Juan Ponce Enrile	KNP
Salvador Escudero	KNP
Jinggoy Estrada	KNP
Boy Herrera	KNP
Alfredo Lim	KNP
Ernesto Maceda	KNP
Jamby Madrigal	KNP
Nene Pimentel	KNP
Amina Rasul	KNP
Francisco Tatad	PMP

=== Third party ===
Alyansa ng Pag-asa ticket
For President
Raul Roco	Aksyon
For Vice President
Hermie Aquino	Aksyon
For Senators
Francisco Chavez	Reporma–LM
Bong Coo	Aksyon
Nicanor Gatmaytan Jr.	Aksyon
Eduardo Nonato Joson	Aksyon
Atty Batas Mauricio	Aksyon
Jay Sonza	Aksyon
Perfecto Yasay	Aksyon

=== Other coalitions ===
==== Bangon Pilipinas ====
Bangon Pilipinas ticket
For President
Eddie Villanueva	Bangon Pilipinas

==== KBL ====
KBL ticket
For Senators
Alvin Alvincent Almirante	KBL
Oliver Lozano	KBL
Norma Nueva	KBL

==== LDP ====
LDP-Aquino wing ticket
For President
Ping Lacson	LDP-Aquino wing
For Senators
Heherson Alvarez	LDP-Aquino wing
Carlos Padilla	LDP-Aquino wing

==== PIBID ====
Partido Isang Bansa Isang Diwa ticket
For Vice President
Rodolfo Pajo	PIBID
For Senators
Ismael Aparri	PIBID
Carmen Borja	PIBID
Pendatun Decampong	PIBID
Arturo Estuita	PIBID
El Cid Fajardo	PIBID
Ramon Montaño	PIBID
Iderlina Pagunuran	PIBID
Angel Rosario	PIBID
Matuan Usop	PIBID

==== Independents ====
Independents
Name	Party
Gerardo del Mundo	Independent
Eddie Ilarde	Independent
Pilar Pilapil	Independent

== Results ==
The official results of the election were released in staggered dates with most winners in local elective positions declared within two weeks from the May 10 election date. The winners in the Senatorial and Party-list Representative elections were declared on May 24, with the exception of the 12th senator which was announced on June 3. The results of the presidential and vice-presidential races were finalized by the Congress on June 20, more than a month after the elections. Out of the 43,536,028 registered voters, about 35.4 million ballots were cast giving a voter turn-out of 81.4%.

Shown below are the official tallies of the presidential, vice-presidential, and senatorial races as well as the last tallies of the Quickcount conducted by the National Movement for Free Elections (NAMFREL), the citizens' arm of the COMELEC.

=== President ===
Candidate	Party	Votes	%
Gloria Macapagal Arroyo (incumbent)	Lakas–CMD	12,905,808	39.99
Fernando Poe Jr.	Koalisyon ng Nagkakaisang Pilipino	11,782,232	36.51
Panfilo Lacson	Laban ng Demokratikong Pilipino (Aquino wing) (Note: Lacson ran under the wing of the LDP led by Butz Aquino; the rest of the party supported Poe's candidacy.)	3,510,080	10.88
Raul Roco	Aksyon Demokratiko	2,082,762	6.45
Eddie Villanueva	Bangon Pilipinas	1,988,218	6.16
Total		32,269,100	100.00
Valid votes		32,269,100	96.30
Invalid/blank votes		1,240,992	3.70
Total votes		33,510,092	100.00
Registered voters/turnout		43,895,324	76.34

=== Vice president ===
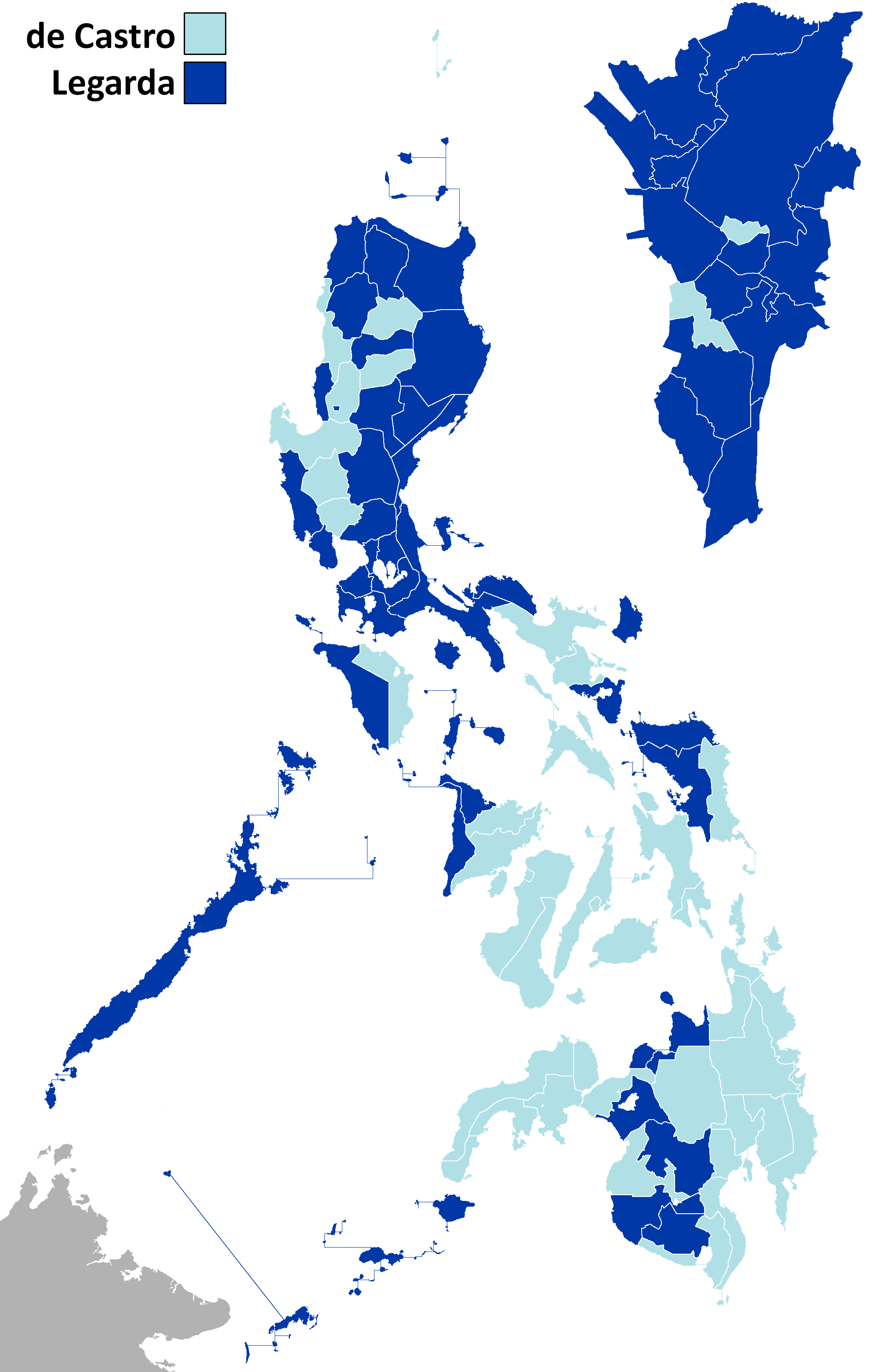
Vice presidential election results per province/city.

Candidate	Party	Votes	%
Noli de Castro (Note: Running mate of Gloria Macapagal Arroyo (Lakas–CMD))	Independent	15,100,431	49.80
Loren Legarda	Koalisyon ng Nagkakaisang Pilipino	14,218,709	46.89
Herminio Aquino	Aksyon Demokratiko	981,500	3.24
Rodolfo Pajo (Note: Running mate of Eddie Gil (Partido Isang Bansa, Isang Diwa) who was disqualified)	Partido Isang Bansa, Isang Diwa	22,244	0.07
Total		30,322,884	100.00
Valid votes		30,322,884	90.49
Invalid/blank votes		3,187,208	9.51
Total votes		33,510,092	100.00
Registered voters/turnout		43,895,324	76.34

==== Legarda vs. De Castro electoral protest ====
On January 18, 2008, in a 21-page resolution, penned by Senior Justice Leonardo Quisumbing, the Supreme Court of the Philippines, acting as the Presidential Electoral Tribunal (PET), dismissed Sen. Loren Legarda's electoral protest against Noli de Castro. 3 reasons supported the judgment: first, the PET approved the recommendation of Hearing Commissioner and former Commission on Elections (Comelec) Chair retired SC Justice Bernardo P. Pardo that "the pilot-tested revision of ballots or re-tabulation of the certificates of canvass would not affect the winning margin of the protestee in the final canvass of the returns, in addition to the ground of abandonment or withdrawal by reason of Protestant's candidacy for, election and assumption of the office Senator of the Philippines;" second, Legarda's failure to pay the P 3.9 million ($1 = P 40) revision of ballots (in 124,404 precincts) fee despite court extension under Rule 33 of the PET; and third, jurisprudence of Defensor Santiago v. Ramos, teaches that Legarda "effectively abandoned or withdrawn her protest when she ran in the Senate, which term coincides with the term of the Vice-Presidency 2004–2010." Meanwhile, Noli De Castro on television stated: "This is the triumph of truth. The truth that I won fair and square. I thank the Supreme Court for echoing the true voice of the people. From the very beginning I was confident that I received the overwhelming mandate of our people as Vice President." Legarda stated that she will file a motion for reconsideration in due course.

=== Congress ===
In the legislative elections, voters elected twelve Senators (half the members of the Senate), who are elected at large with the whole country voting as one constituency, and all 208 members of the House of Representatives, who are elected from single-member districts.

==== Senate ====
Representation of results; seats contested are inside the box. Lakas-NUCD-UMDP KNP Liberal Party LDP PDP–Laban PRP Independent Vacancy

The COMELEC sits as the National Board of Canvassers for the 12 senatorial positions.

Candidate	Party or alliance		Votes	%
Mar Roxas	Koalisyon ng Katapatan at Karanasan sa Kinabukasan	Liberal Party	19,372,888	54.56
Bong Revilla	Koalisyon ng Katapatan at Karanasan sa Kinabukasan	Lakas–CMD	15,801,531	44.50
Nene Pimentel	Koalisyon ng Nagkakaisang Pilipino		13,519,998	38.07
Jamby Madrigal	Koalisyon ng Nagkakaisang Pilipino		13,253,692	37.32
Dick Gordon	Koalisyon ng Katapatan at Karanasan sa Kinabukasan	Lakas–CMD	12,707,151	35.78
Pia Cayetano	Koalisyon ng Katapatan at Karanasan sa Kinabukasan	Lakas–CMD	12,542,054	35.32
Miriam Defensor Santiago	Koalisyon ng Katapatan at Karanasan sa Kinabukasan	People's Reform Party	12,187,401	34.32
Alfredo Lim	Koalisyon ng Nagkakaisang Pilipino		11,286,428	31.78
Juan Ponce Enrile	Koalisyon ng Nagkakaisang Pilipino		11,191,162	31.52
Jinggoy Estrada	Koalisyon ng Nagkakaisang Pilipino		11,094,120	31.24
Lito Lapid	Koalisyon ng Katapatan at Karanasan sa Kinabukasan	Lakas–CMD	10,970,941	30.90
Rodolfo Biazon	Koalisyon ng Katapatan at Karanasan sa Kinabukasan	Liberal Party	10,635,270	29.95
Robert Barbers	Koalisyon ng Katapatan at Karanasan sa Kinabukasan	Lakas–CMD	10,624,585	29.92
Ernesto Maceda	Koalisyon ng Nagkakaisang Pilipino		9,944,328	28.00
John Henry Osmeña	Koalisyon ng Katapatan at Karanasan sa Kinabukasan	Independent	9,914,179	27.92
Orly Mercado	Koalisyon ng Katapatan at Karanasan sa Kinabukasan	Lakas–CMD	8,295,024	23.36
Robert Jaworski	Koalisyon ng Katapatan at Karanasan sa Kinabukasan	Lakas–CMD	6,921,425	19.49
Boots Anson-Roa	Koalisyon ng Nagkakaisang Pilipino		5,873,845	16.54
Francisco Tatad	Koalisyon ng Nagkakaisang Pilipino	Pwersa ng Masang Pilipino	5,718,740	16.10
Heherson Alvarez	Independent		4,791,085	13.49
Ernesto Herrera	Koalisyon ng Nagkakaisang Pilipino		4,612,036	12.99
Perfecto Yasay	Alyansa ng Pag-asa	Aksyon Demokratiko	4,408,808	12.42
Francisco Chavez	Alyansa ng Pag-asa	Partido ng Demokratikong Reporma–Lapiang Manggagawa	4,286,838	12.07
Carlos Padilla	Independent		3,863,693	10.88
Salvador Escudero	Koalisyon ng Nagkakaisang Pilipino		3,780,469	10.65
Amina Rasul	Koalisyon ng Nagkakaisang Pilipino		3,456,480	9.73
Jay Sonza	Alyansa ng Pag-asa	Aksyon Demokratiko	2,839,442	8.00
Parouk Hussin	Koalisyon ng Katapatan at Karanasan sa Kinabukasan	Lakas–CMD	2,821,522	7.95
Didagen Dilangalen	Koalisyon ng Nagkakaisang Pilipino		2,222,069	6.26
Melanio Mauricio Jr.	Alyansa ng Pag-asa	Aksyon Demokratiko	1,144,279	3.22
Pilar Pilapil	Independent		692,137	1.95
Eduardo Nonato Joson	Alyansa ng Pag-asa	Aksyon Demokratiko	631,041	1.78
Eddie Ilarde	Independent		527,865	1.49
Nicanor Gatmaytan Jr.	Alyansa ng Pag-asa	Aksyon Demokratiko	453,693	1.28
Bong Coo	Alyansa ng Pag-asa	Aksyon Demokratiko	338,846	0.95
Oliver Lozano	Kilusang Bagong Lipunan		238,272	0.67
Alvin Alvincent Almirante	Kilusang Bagong Lipunan		206,097	0.58
Ramon Montaño	Partido Isang Bansa, Isang Diwa		159,735	0.45
Matuan Usop	Partido Isang Bansa, Isang Diwa		137,376	0.39
Angel Rosario	Partido Isang Bansa, Isang Diwa		98,932	0.28
Ismael Aparri	Partido Isang Bansa, Isang Diwa		97,430	0.27
Norma Nueva	Kilusang Bagong Lipunan		96,129	0.27
Carmen Borja	Partido Isang Bansa, Isang Diwa		95,755	0.27
Pendatun Decampong	Partido Isang Bansa, Isang Diwa		94,713	0.27
Gerardo del Mundo	Independent		88,962	0.25
El Cid Fajardo	Partido Isang Bansa, Isang Diwa		79,471	0.22
Iderlina Pagunuran	Partido Isang Bansa, Isang Diwa		59,712	0.17
Arturo Estuita	Partido Isang Bansa, Isang Diwa		39,094	0.11
Total			254,216,743	100.00
Total votes			35,510,092	–
Registered voters/turnout			43,536,028	81.56
Source: COMELEC (vote totals), NCSB (turnout)

==== House of Representatives ====
===== Elections at congressional districts =====
Party	Seats	+/–
Lakas–CMD	92	+13
Nationalist People's Coalition	53	+11
Liberal Party	29	+10
Laban ng Demokratikong Pilipino	15	−6
Pwersa ng Masang Pilipino	5	+1
Aksyon Demokratiko	2	0
Kabalikat ng Malayang Pilipino	2	+1
Nacionalista Party	2	New
PDP–Laban	2	0
Kilusang Bagong Lipunan	1	0
Partido Demokratiko Sosyalista ng Pilipinas	1	0
Partido para sa Demokratikong Reporma	1	−1
Independent	4	−4
Party-list seats (Note: Only 28 were seated in the party-list election.)	52	0
Total	261	0

===== Party-list election =====
Party	Votes	%	+/–	Seats	+/–
Bayan Muna	1,203,305	9.46	−1.84	3	0
Association of Philippine Electric Cooperatives	934,995	7.35	+2.04	3	0
Akbayan	852,473	6.70	+4.20	3	+1
Buhay Hayaan Yumabong	705,730	5.55	+3.63	2	+1
Anakpawis	538,396	4.23	+4.23	2	+1
Citizens' Battle Against Corruption	495,193	3.89	+1.75	2	+1
Gabriela Women's Party	464,586	3.65	New	2	+1
Partido ng Manggagawa	448,072	3.52	+2.09	2	+1
Butil Farmers Party	429,259	3.37	+1.19	2	+1
Alliance of Volunteer Educators	343,498	2.70	New	1	New
Alagad	340,977	2.68	+1.91	1	New
Veterans Freedom Party	340,759	2.68	−1.16	1	+1
Cooperative NATCCO Network Party	270,950	2.13	+0.63	1	New
Anak Mindanao	269,750	2.12	+0.43	1	0
Ang Laban ng Indiginong Filipino	269,345	2.12	New	1	New
An Waray	268,164	2.11	New	1	New
Alyansang Bayanihan ng mga Magsasaka Mangagawang Bukid at Mangingisda and Adhikain at Kilusan ng Ordinaryong Tao	251,597	1.98	New	0	–
Alliance for Nationalism and Democracy	244,137	1.92	New	0	–
Senior Citizens/Elderly	236,571	1.86	New	0	–
Philippines Guardians Brotherhood	213,662	1.68	New	0	–
Ang Nagkakaisang Kabataan para sa Sambayanan	213,068	1.67	New	0	–
Trade Union Congress Party	201,396	1.58	New	0	–
Sanlakas	189,517	1.49	+0.49	0	−1
Bigkis Pinoy Movement	186,264	1.46	+0.43	0	–
Suara Bangsamoro	164,494	1.29	New	0	–
Philippine Coconut Producers Federation	163,952	1.29	−0.23	0	−1
Sagip-Kapwa Foundation	161,797	1.27	New	0	–
Aksyon Sambayan	156,467	1.23	New	0	–
People's Movement Against Poverty	144,740	1.14	New	0	–
Barangay Association for National Advancement and Transparency	143,454	1.13	New	0	–
Abay Pamiliya Foundation	133,952	1.05	+0.98	0	–
Samahan ng mga Mangangakal para sa Ikauunlad ng Lokal na Ekonomiya	133,425	1.05	New	0	–
Abanse! Pinay	115,855	0.91	+0.02	0	−1
Migrante Sectoral Party of Overseas Filipinos and their Families	110,507	0.87	New	0	–
Alab Katipunan	92,262	0.73	New	0	–
Assalam Bangsamoro People's Party	91,975	0.72	New	0	–
Gabay ng Manggagawang Pilipino Party	89,978	0.71	+0.59	0	–
Alyansa ng may Kapansanang Pinoy	86,673	0.68	New	0	–
Pinoy Overseas	79,214	0.62	New	0	–
Ahonbayan	68,203	0.54	+0.35	0	–
Advocates and Adherents of Social Justice for School Teachers and Allied Workers	65,596	0.52	New	0	–
Seaman's Party	65,231	0.51	+0.01	0	–
Bahandi sa Kaumahan ug Kadagatan	61,665	0.48	New	0	–
National Federation of Small Coconut Farmers Organization	55,378	0.44	New	0	–
Bagong Tao Movement	52,919	0.42	New	0	–
Alyansa ng Sambayanan para sa Pagbabago	50,063	0.39	New	0	–
Maritime Party	48,037	0.38	−0.27	0	–
Visayas Farmers Party	42,920	0.34	New	0	–
The True Marcos Loyalist (For God Country and People)	42,050	0.33	−0.81	0	–
Mindanao Federation of Small Coconut Farmers Organization	39,194	0.31	New	0	–
Philippine Confederation of Drivers Organization and Alliance of Concerned Transport Operators	38,093	0.30	New	0	–
Organisasyon ng Manggagawang Mag-aangat sa Republika	38,389	0.30	New	0	–
Confederation of Grains Retailers Association of the Philippines	33,950	0.27	New	0	–
Lapiang Manggagawa	31,386	0.25	New	0	–
Philippine Association of Retired Persons	30,984	0.24	New	0	–
Farmers and Fisherfolks Aggrupation of the Philippines	28,739	0.23	New	0	–
Aging Pilipino Organization	27,609	0.22	New	0	–
Kaisang Loob para sa Marangal na Paninirahan	26,392	0.21	New	0	–
Partido Katutubo Pilipino	22,370	0.18	New	0	–
Partido Isang Bansa, Isang Diwa	17,994	0.14	New	0	–
Visayan Association of the Philippines	13,340	0.10	New	0	–
Novelty Entrepreneurship & Livelihood for Food	13,266	0.10	New	0	–
Tribal Association of the Philippines	8,753	0.07	New	0	–
Federation of Land Reform Farmers of the Philippines	8,660	0.07	New	0	–
Sandigang Maralita	7,992	0.06	−0.01	0	–
Democratic Workers of the Philippines	3,900	0.03	−0.01	0	–
Total	12,723,482	100.00	–	28	+11
Valid votes	12,723,482	35.83	+13.70		
Invalid/blank votes	22,786,610	64.17	−13.70		
Total votes	35,510,092	100.00	–		
Registered voters/turnout	44,872,007	79.14	−2.12		
Source: COMELEC

=== Local ===
In the local elections, voters elected governors, vice-governors, and board members of the country's 79 provinces, and the mayor, vice-mayor and councilors of the nation's more than 1,600 cities and municipalities.

==== Gubernatorial elections ====
The following are the results of the gubernatorial elections by party:

Party	Seats
Lakas–NUCD–UMDP	39
Nationalist People's Coalition	13
Liberal Party	10
Laban ng Demokratikong Pilipino	7
Pwersa ng Masang Pilipino	3
Aksyon Demokratiko	1
Kilusang Bagong Lipunan	1
Koalisyon ng Nagkakaisang Pilipino	1
Partido Demokratiko Sosyalista ng Pilipinas	1
Sarangani Reconciliation and Reformation Organization	1
Independents	2
Total	79
Source: Commission on Elections

The following are the results of the gubernatorial elections by province:

Province	Elected governor	Party
Abra	Vicente Valera	NPC
Agusan del Norte	Erlpe John Amante	Lakas
Agusan del Sur	Adolph Edward Plaza	Lakas
Aklan	Carlito Marquez	Lakas
Albay	Fernando Gonzales	Independent
Antique	Salvacion Z. Perez	Liberal
Apayao	Elias Bulut Sr.	PMP
Aurora	Bella Angara	LDP
Basilan	Wahab Akbar	Lakas
Bataan	Joet Garcia	Lakas
Batanes	Vicente Gato	Liberal
Batangas	Armando Sanchez	Liberal
Benguet	Borromeo Melchor	LDP
Biliran	Rogelio Espina	Lakas
Bohol	Erico Aumentado	Lakas
Bukidnon	Jose Maria Zubiri Jr.	Lakas
Bulacan	Josefina dela Cruz	Lakas
Cagayan	Edgar Lara	NPC
Camarines Norte	Jesus Typoco Jr.	Lakas
Camarines Sur	Luis Raymund Villafuerte	Lakas
Camiguin	Pedro Romualdo	Lakas
Capiz	Vicente Bermejo	Liberal
Catanduanes	Leandro Verceles Jr.	Lakas
Cavite	Ayong Maliksi	LDP
Cebu	Gwendolyn Garcia	Lakas
Compostela Valley	Jose Caballero	Lakas
Cotabato	Emmanuel Piñol	Lakas
Davao del Norte	Gelacio Gementiza	Lakas
Davao del Sur	Benjamin Bautista Jr.	NPC
Davao Oriental	Maria Elena Palma Gil	Lakas
Eastern Samar	Ben Evardone	LDP
Guimaras	JC Rahman Nava	Liberal
Ifugao	Benjamin Cappleman	Independent
Ilocos Norte	Bongbong Marcos	KBL
Ilocos Sur	Chavit Singson	Lakas
Iloilo	Niel Tupas	Liberal
Isabela	Grace Padaca	Aksyon
Kalinga	Dominador Belac	Liberal
La Union	Victor Ortega	Lakas
Laguna	Teresita Lazaro	Lakas
Lanao del Norte	Imelda Dimaporo	Lakas
Lanao del Sur	Mamintal Adiong Sr.	Lakas
Leyte	Jericho Petilla	NPC
Maguindanao	Andal Ampatuan Sr.	Lakas
Marinduque	Carmencita Reyes	Lakas
Masbate	Antonio Kho	Lakas
Misamis Occidental	Loreto Leo Ocampos	Lakas
Misamis Oriental	Oscar Moreno	Lakas
Mountain Province	Maximo Dalog	LDP
Negros Occidental	Joseph Marañon	NPC
Negros Oriental	George Arnaiz	NPC
Northern Samar	Raul Daza	Liberal
Nueva Ecija	Tomas Joson III	NPC
Nueva Vizcaya	Luisa Cuaresma	LDP
Occidental Mindoro	Josephine Sato	NPC
Oriental Mindoro	Bartolome Marasigan	Lakas
Palawan	Mario Joel Reyes	Lakas
Pampanga	Mark Lapid	Lakas
Pangasinan	Victor Agbayani	Lakas
Quezon	Wilfrido Enverga	KNP
Quirino	Pedro Bacani	Liberal
Rizal	Casimiro Ynares Jr.	PMP
Romblon	Perpetuo Ylagan	NPC
Samar	Milagrosa Tan	Liberal
Sarangani	Paul Rene Dominguez	SARRO
Siquijor	Orlando Fua Sr.	Lakas
Sorsogon	Raul Lee	Lakas
South Cotabato	Daisy Fuentes	NPC
Southern Leyte	Rosette Lerias	NPC
Sultan Kudarat	Pax Mangudadatu	Lakas
Sulu	Benjamin Loong	Lakas
Surigao del Norte	Robert Lyndon Barbers	Lakas
Surigao del Sur	Vicente Pimentel Jr.	Lakas
Tarlac	Jose Yap	NPC
Tawi-Tawi	Sadikul Sahali	PMP
Zambales	Vicente Magsaysay	Lakas
Zamboanga del Norte	Rolando Yebes	PDSP
Zamboanga del Sur	Aurora E. Cerilles	NPC
Zamboanga Sibugay	George T. Hofer	LDP
Source: Commission on Elections

==== Vice gubernatorial elections ====
The following are the results of the vice gubernatorial elections by party:

Party	Seats
Lakas–NUCD–UMDP	38
Nationalist People's Coalition	15
Laban ng Demokratikong Pilipino	7
Liberal Party	7
Partido Demokratiko Sosyalista ng Pilipinas	2
Pwersa ng Masang Pilipino	2
Aksyon Demokratiko	1
Kilusang Bagong Lipunan	1
Ompia Party	1
Partido para sa Demokratikong Reporma	1
Pwersa ng Masang Pilipino/Nationalist People's Coalition	1
Independents	3
Total	79
Source: Commission on Elections

The following are the results of the vice gubernatorial elections by province:

Province	Elected vice governor	Party
Abra	Jaime Lo	NPC
Agusan del Norte	Dale Corvera	Lakas
Agusan del Sur	Virginia Getes	Lakas
Aklan	Ronquillo Tolentino	Lakas
Albay	Jesus Calisin	Lakas
Antique	Rhodora Cadiao	Lakas
Apayao	Paul Delwasen	NPC
Aurora	Annabelle Tangson	LDP
Basilan	Al-Rasheed Ahmad Sakkalahul	Aksyon
Bataan	Benjamin Alonzo	PDSP
Batanes	Constante Castillejos	Liberal
Batangas	Richard Recto	Lakas
Benguet	Cresencio Pacalso	NPC
Biliran	Carlos Chan	Lakas
Bohol	Julius Caesar Herrera	Lakas
Bukidnon	Alex Calingasan	Lakas
Bulacan	Aurelio Plamenco	Lakas
Cagayan	Oscar Pagulayan	LDP
Camarines Norte	Edgar Tallado	PMP/NPC
Camarines Sur	Salvio Fortuno	Lakas
Camiguin	Leo Lasacar	Lakas
Capiz	Victor Tanco	Liberal
Catanduanes	Vincent Villaluna	Independent
Cavite	Jonvic Remulla	LDP
Cebu	Gregorio Sanchez Jr.	Independent
Compostela Valley	Ramil Gentugaya	Lakas
Cotabato	Jesus Sacdalan	Lakas
Davao del Norte	Antonio del Rosario	Lakas
Davao del Sur	Romualdo Garcia	NPC
Davao Oriental	Edgardo Lopez	Lakas
Eastern Samar	Leander Geli	NPC
Guimaras	Aurelio Tionado	Liberal
Ifugao	Glenn Prudenciano	Lakas
Ilocos Norte	Windell Chua	KBL
Ilocos Sur	Deogracias Victor Savellano	Lakas
Iloilo	Roberto Armada	Lakas
Isabela	Ramon Reyes	Lakas
Kalinga	Rommel Diasen	LDP
La Union	Augusto Nisce	Lakas
Laguna	Edwin Olivarez	Lakas
Lanao del Norte	Irma Ali	Lakas
Lanao del Sur	Bashier Manalo	Ompia
Leyte	Maria Mimietta Bagulaya	NPC
Maguindanao	Bimbo Sinsuat Sr.	Lakas
Marinduque	Leandro Palma	Lakas
Masbate	Raul Estrella	Lakas
Misamis Occidental	Francisco Paylaga Jr.	Reporma
Misamis Oriental	Julio Uy	Lakas
Mountain Province	Benjamin Dominguez	Independent
Negros Occidental	Isidro Zayco	Lakas
Negros Oriental	Jose Baldado	NPC
Northern Samar	Guido Lavin Jr.	Liberal
Nueva Ecija	Mariano Cristino Joson	NPC
Nueva Vizcaya	Jose Gambito	LDP
Occidental Mindoro	Mario Gene Mendiola	NPC
Oriental Mindoro	Arnan Panaligan	Lakas
Palawan	David Ponce de Leon	NPC
Pampanga	Yeng Guiao	Lakas
Pangasinan	Oscar Lambino	Lakas
Quezon	David Suarez	Liberal
Quirino	Dakila Cua	Liberal
Rizal	Jestoni Alarcon	PMP
Romblon	Samuel Romero	Lakas
Samar	Jesus Redaja	Liberal
Sarangani	Bridget Chiongbian-Huang	Lakas
Siquijor	Carl Mark Ganhinhin	LDP
Sorsogon	Antonio Escudero	NPC
South Cotabato	Eliordo Ogena	NPC
Southern Leyte	Miguel Maamo II	NPC
Sultan Kudarat	Donato Ligo	Lakas
Sulu	Nur-Ana Sahidulla	Lakas
Surigao del Norte	Rodolfo Navarro	Lakas
Surigao del Sur	Librado Navarro	Lakas
Tarlac	Marcelino Aganon Jr.	NPC
Tawi-Tawi	Jilkasi Usman	PMP
Zambales	Ramon Lacbain II	LDP
Zamboanga del Norte	Francis Olvis	PDSP
Zamboanga del Sur	Roseller Ariosa	NPC
Zamboanga Sibugay	Eric Cabarios	Lakas
Source: Commission on Elections

==== Provincial board elections ====
The following are the results of the provincial board elections by party:

Party	Seats
Lakas–NUCD–UMDP	350
Nationalist People's Coalition	128
Liberal Party	77
Laban ng Demokratikong Pilipino	44
Pwersa ng Masang Pilipino	32
Koalisyon ng Nagkakaisang Pilipino	8
Partido Demokratiko Sosyalista ng Pilipinas	8
Bagong Lakas ng Nueva Ecija/Nationalist People's Coalition	7
Kilusang Bagong Lipunan	7
Partido para sa Demokratikong Reporma	7
Nationalist People's Coalition/Sama Sama Tarlac	6
Kabalikat ng Malayang Pilipino	5
Aksyon Demokratiko	3
United Negros Alliance	3
Barug Alang sa Kauswagan ug Demokrasya/Nationalist People's Coalition	2
Buklod Capampangan	2
Laban ng Demokratikong Pilipino/Partido Magdalo	2
Partido Magdalo/Laban ng Demokratikong Pilipino	2
Nationalist People's Coalition/Lakas–NUCD–UMDP	2
Nationalist People's Coalition/United Negros Alliance	2
Nagkakaisang Partido ng mga Kapampangan/Nationalist People's Coalition	2
Alayon Alang sa Kalambu-an ng Kalinaw/MASA	1
FND/MASA	1
Independent Nacionalistas and Allies/Nationalist People's Coalition	1
Lakas–NUCD–UMDP/Bileg Party	1
Lakas–NUCD–UMDP/Liberal Party	1
Lihok/Lakas–NUCD–UMDP	1
Nacionalista Party	1
Nationalist People's Coalition/Alayon Alang sa Kalambu-an ng Kalinaw	1
Nagkakaisang Partido ng mga Kapampangan/Lakas–NUCD–UMDP/Nationalist People's Coalition	1
Ompia Party	1
Ompia Party/Nationalist People's Coalition	1
PDP–Laban	1
Sarangani Reconciliation and Reformation Organization/Laban ng Demokratikong Pilipino	1
Ugyon Party	1
No party	4
Independents/MASA	2
Independents	37
Total	756
Source: Commission on Elections

The following are the results of the provincial board elections by province:

Province	Elected seats	Party	Seats won
Abra	8	NPC	3
Abra	8	PDSP	3
Abra	8	Lakas	1
Abra	8	Liberal	1
Agusan del Norte	10	Lakas	6
Agusan del Norte	10	Liberal	4
Agusan del Sur	10	Lakas	10
Aklan	10	Lakas	5
Aklan	10	Liberal	3
Aklan	10	LDP	1
Aklan	10	PDP–Laban	1
Albay	10	Lakas	7
Albay	10	PMP	2
Albay	10	Independent	1
Antique	10	Lakas	4
Antique	10	Liberal	4
Antique	10	LDP	1
Antique	10	NPC	1
Apayao	8	NPC	8
Aurora	8	Lakas	5
Aurora	8	LDP	3
Basilan	8	Lakas	6
Basilan	8	Liberal	1
Basilan	8	PMP	1
Bataan	10	NPC	7
Bataan	10	Lakas	3
Batanes	6	Liberal	6
Batangas	10	Lakas	4
Batangas	10	Liberal	4
Batangas	10	LDP	1
Batangas	10	Independent	1
Benguet	10	NPC	6
Benguet	10	Liberal	2
Benguet	10	Aksyon	1
Benguet	10	Lakas	1
Biliran	8	Lakas	7
Biliran	8	Independent	1
Bohol	10	Lakas	9
Bohol	10	KNP	1
Bukidnon	10	Lakas	10
Bulacan	10	Lakas	10
Cagayan	10	NPC	7
Cagayan	10	Lakas	1
Cagayan	10	LDP	1
Cagayan	10	Independent	1
Camarines Norte	10	Lakas	9
Camarines Norte	10	KNP	1
Camarines Sur	10	Lakas	7
Camarines Sur	10	NPC	2
Camarines Sur	10	Liberal	1
Camiguin	8	Lakas	8
Capiz	10	Liberal	9
Capiz	10	Lakas	1
Catanduanes	8	Lakas	3
Catanduanes	8	NPC	2
Catanduanes	8	Reporma	2
Catanduanes	8	Kampi	1
Cavite	10	LDP	3
Cavite	10	LDP/Magdalo	2
Cavite	10	Magdalo/LDP	2
Cavite	10	Lakas	2
Cavite	10	Nacionalista	1
Cebu	12	Bakud/NPC	2
Cebu	12	NPC	2
Cebu	12	Alayon/MASA	1
Cebu	12	FND/MASA	1
Cebu	12	Lakas	1
Cebu	12	NPC/Alayon	1
Cebu	12	Independent/MASA	2
Cebu	12	Independent	2
Compostela Valley	10	Lakas	10
Cotabato	10	Lakas	8
Cotabato	10	Lihok/Lakas	1
Cotabato	10	Independent	1
Davao del Norte	10	Lakas	9
Davao del Norte	10	NPC	1
Davao del Sur	10	NPC	9
Davao del Sur	10	Lakas	1
Davao Oriental	10	Lakas	4
Davao Oriental	10	Kampi	3
Davao Oriental	10	NPC	3
Eastern Samar	10	NPC	8
Eastern Samar	10	LDP	2
Guimaras	8	Liberal	8
Ifugao	8	Liberal	3
Ifugao	8	Lakas	3
Ifugao	8	Independent	2
Ilocos Norte	10	KBL	7
Ilocos Norte	10	Aksyon	1
Ilocos Norte	10	Lakas	1
Ilocos Norte	10	Independent	1
Ilocos Sur	10	Lakas	5
Ilocos Sur	10	Lakas/Bileg	1
Ilocos Sur	10	Lakas/Liberal	1
Ilocos Sur	10	LDP	1
Ilocos Sur	10	NPC	1
Ilocos Sur	10	Independent	1
Iloilo	10	Liberal	5
Iloilo	10	Aksyon	1
Iloilo	10	PMP	1
Iloilo	10	Ugyon	1
Iloilo	10	No party	1
Iloilo	10	Independent	1
Isabela	10	NPC	5
Isabela	10	PMP	3
Isabela	10	Lakas	2
Kalinga	8	Lakas	1
Kalinga	8	Liberal	1
Kalinga	8	NPC	1
Kalinga	8	NPC/Lakas	1
Kalinga	8	No party	1
Kalinga	8	Independent	3
La Union	10	Lakas	7
La Union	10	NPC	2
La Union	10	LDP	1
Laguna	10	Lakas	9
Laguna	10	LDP	1
Lanao del Norte	10	Lakas	9
Lanao del Norte	10	LDP	1
Lanao del Sur	10	Lakas	4
Lanao del Sur	10	LDP	2
Lanao del Sur	10	Ompia	1
Lanao del Sur	10	Ompia/NPC	1
Lanao del Sur	10	No party	1
Lanao del Sur	10	Independent	1
Leyte	10	NPC	7
Leyte	10	Liberal	2
Leyte	10	LDP	1
Maguindanao	10	Lakas	10
Marinduque	8	Lakas	3
Marinduque	8	Independent	5
Masbate	10	Lakas	6
Masbate	10	NPC	3
Masbate	10	INA/NPC	1
Misamis Occidental	10	Lakas	4
Misamis Occidental	10	Reporma	4
Misamis Occidental	10	No party	1
Misamis Occidental	10	Independent	1
Misamis Oriental	10	Lakas	7
Misamis Oriental	10	LDP	3
Mountain Province	8	LDP	5
Mountain Province	8	Independent	3
Negros Occidental	12	UNegA	3
Negros Occidental	12	NPC	2
Negros Occidental	12	NPC/UNegA	2
Negros Occidental	12	Lakas	1
Negros Occidental	12	Reporma	1
Negros Occidental	12	Independent	3
Negros Oriental	10	Lakas	6
Negros Oriental	10	NPC	2
Negros Oriental	10	KNP	1
Negros Oriental	10	LDP	1
Northern Samar	10	Liberal	9
Northern Samar	10	Lakas	1
Nueva Ecija	10	Balane/NPC	7
Nueva Ecija	10	Lakas	2
Nueva Ecija	10	Kampi	1
Nueva Vizcaya	10	Lakas	4
Nueva Vizcaya	10	LDP	4
Nueva Vizcaya	10	NPC	2
Occidental Mindoro	10	NPC	5
Occidental Mindoro	10	Lakas	3
Occidental Mindoro	10	LDP	2
Oriental Mindoro	10	Lakas	5
Oriental Mindoro	10	LDP	3
Oriental Mindoro	10	Liberal	2
Palawan	10	Lakas	8
Palawan	10	NPC	2
Pampanga	10	Lakas	3
Pampanga	10	Buklod Capampangan	2
Pampanga	10	NPC	2
Pampanga	10	NPK/NPC	2
Pampanga	10	NPK/Lakas/NPC	1
Pangasinan	12	Lakas	7
Pangasinan	12	NPC	3
Pangasinan	12	LDP	1
Pangasinan	12	PMP	1
Quezon	10	KNP	5
Quezon	10	Liberal	3
Quezon	10	Lakas	2
Quirino	8	Liberal	4
Quirino	8	LDP	1
Quirino	8	PMP	1
Quirino	8	Independent	2
Rizal	10	PMP	7
Rizal	10	Lakas	1
Rizal	10	Liberal	1
Rizal	10	Independent	1
Romblon	8	Lakas	7
Romblon	8	LDP	1
Samar	10	Liberal	4
Samar	10	LDP	3
Samar	10	Lakas	2
Samar	10	Independent	1
Sarangani	10	Lakas	9
Sarangani	10	SARRO/LDP	1
Siquijor	8	Lakas	5
Siquijor	8	LDP	1
Siquijor	8	NPC	1
Siquijor	8	PDSP	1
Sorsogon	10	Lakas	6
Sorsogon	10	NPC	2
Sorsogon	10	PMP	1
Sorsogon	10	Independent	1
South Cotabato	10	NPC	10
Southern Leyte	8	NPC	4
Southern Leyte	8	Lakas	2
Southern Leyte	8	PMP	2
Sultan Kudarat	10	Lakas	7
Sultan Kudarat	10	NPC	3
Sulu	8	Lakas	6
Sulu	8	PDSP	1
Sulu	8	PMP	1
Surigao del Norte	10	Lakas	10
Surigao del Sur	10	Lakas	6
Surigao del Sur	10	NPC	3
Surigao del Sur	10	NPC/Lakas	1
Tarlac	10	NPC/SST	6
Tarlac	10	NPC	3
Tarlac	10	Lakas	1
Tawi-Tawi	8	Lakas	5
Tawi-Tawi	8	PMP	1
Tawi-Tawi	8	Independent	2
Zambales	10	Lakas	6
Zambales	10	PMP	2
Zambales	10	Independent	2
Zamboanga del Norte	10	PMP	5
Zamboanga del Norte	10	PDSP	3
Zamboanga del Norte	10	Lakas	2
Zamboanga del Sur	10	NPC	6
Zamboanga del Sur	10	Lakas	4
Zamboanga Sibugay	10	Lakas	6
Zamboanga Sibugay	10	PMP	4
Source: Commission on Elections

==== Mayoral elections ====
The following are the results of the mayoral elections in highly urbanized and independent component cities and independent municipalities by party:

Party	Seats
Lakas–NUCD–UMDP	17
Laban ng Demokratikong Pilipino	7
Nationalist People's Coalition	4
PDP–Laban	3
Liberal Party	2
Kilusang Diwa ng Taguig	1
Pwersa ng Masang Pilipino	1
Independents	1
Total	36
Source: Commission on Elections

The following are the results of the mayoral elections in highly urbanized and independent component cities and independent municipalities:

City/Municipality	Elected mayor	Party
Angeles City	Carmelo Lazatin Sr.	Lakas
Bacolod	Evelio Leonardia	NPC
Baguio	Braulio Yaranon	LDP
Butuan	Democrito Plaza II	Lakas
Cagayan de Oro	Vicente Emano	Lakas
Caloocan	Recom Echiverri	LDP
Cebu City	Tomas Osmeña	Lakas
Cotabato City	Muslimin Sema	Lakas
Dagupan	Benjamin Lim	Lakas
Davao City	Rodrigo Duterte	PDP–Laban
General Santos	Pedro Acharon Jr.	NPC
Iligan	Lawrence Cruz	LDP
Iloilo City	Jerry Treñas	Lakas
Las Piñas	Imelda Aguilar	Independent
Lucena	Ramon Talaga	Lakas
Makati	Jejomar Binay	PDP–Laban
Malabon	Canuto Oreta	LDP
Mandaluyong	Neptali Gonzales II	Lakas
Mandaue	Thadeo Ouano	Lakas
Manila	Lito Atienza	Liberal
Marikina	Marides Fernando	Lakas
Muntinlupa	Jaime Fresnedi	Lakas
Naga	Jesse Robredo	Liberal
Navotas	Toby Tiangco	NPC
Olongapo	James Gordon	Lakas
Ormoc	Eric Codilla	Lakas
Parañaque	Florencio Bernabe Jr.	Lakas
Pasay	Wenceslao Trinidad	LDP
Pasig	Vicente Eusebio	PDP–Laban
Pateros	Rosendo Capco	Lakas
Quezon City	Feliciano Belmonte Jr.	Lakas
San Juan	JV Ejercito	PMP
Santiago	Amelita Navarro	LDP
Taguig	Sigfrido Tiñga	KDT
Valenzuela	Sherwin Gatchalian	NPC
Zamboanga City	Celso Lobregat	LDP
Source: Commission on Elections

==== Vice mayoral elections ====
The following are the results of the vice mayoral elections in highly urbanized and independent component cities and independent municipalities by party:

Party	Seats
Lakas–NUCD–UMDP	17
Laban ng Demokratikong Pilipino	4
PDP–Laban	3
Liberal Party	2
Kilusang Diwa ng Taguig	1
Laban ng Demokratikong Pilipino/Nationalist People's Coalition/Pwersa ng Masang Pilipino	1
Lakas–NUCD–UMDP/PDP–Laban	1
Nationalist People's Coalition	1
Nationalist People's Coalition/PDP–Laban	1
Partido Demokratiko Sosyalista ng Pilipinas/Laban ng Demokratikong Pilipino	1
Pwersa ng Masang Pilipino	1
Independents	3
Total	36
Source: Commission on Elections

The following are the results of the vice mayoral elections in highly urbanized and independent component cities and independent municipalities:

City/Municipality	Elected vice mayor	Party
Angeles City	Ricardo Zalamea	Lakas
Bacolod	Renecito Novero	Lakas
Baguio	Reinaldo Bautista Jr.	PDSP/LDP
Butuan	Angelo Calo	Lakas
Cagayan de Oro	Michelle Tagarda	Lakas
Caloocan	Tito Varela	Lakas
Cebu City	Mike Rama	Lakas
Cotabato City	Japal Guiani Jr.	NPC/PDP–Laban
Dagupan	Alvin Fernandez	Lakas
Davao City	Luis Bonguyan	PDP–Laban
General Santos	Florentino Congson	LDP
Iligan	Henry Dy	LDP
Iloilo City	Guillermo dela Llana	Lakas
Las Piñas	Luis Bustamante	Lakas
Lucena	Roderick Alcala	Liberal
Makati	Ernesto Mercado	PDP–Laban
Malabon	Arnold Vicencio	LDP/NPC/PMP
Mandaluyong	Jesus Cruz	Lakas
Mandaue	Amadeo Seno Jr.	Lakas
Manila	Danny Lacuna	PDP–Laban
Marikina	Marion Andres	Lakas
Muntinlupa	Aldrin San Pedro	Independent
Naga	Gabriel Bordado	Liberal
Navotas	Patrick Joseph Javier	Independent
Olongapo	Rolen Paulino	Independent
Ormoc	Nepomuceno Aparis	Lakas
Parañaque	Anjo Yllana	Lakas
Pasay	Antonino Calixto	LDP
Pasig	Yoyong Martirez	Lakas/PDP–Laban
Pateros	Dominador Rosales Jr.	Lakas
Quezon City	Herbert Bautista	Lakas
San Juan	Leonardo Celles	PMP
Santiago	Armando Tan	Lakas
Taguig	George Elias	KDT
Valenzuela	Antonio Espiritu	NPC
Zamboanga City	Beng Climaco	LDP
Source: Commission on Elections

==== City and municipal council elections ====
The following are the results of the city and municipal council elections in highly urbanized and independent component cities and independent municipalities by party:

Party	Seats
Lakas–NUCD–UMDP	225
Liberal Party	52
Laban ng Demokratikong Pilipino	43
PDP–Laban	36
Nationalist People's Coalition	23
Pwersa ng Masang Pilipino	19
Kilusang Diwa ng Taguig	10
Kabatak	6
Nationalist People's Coalition/Achievers with Integrity Movement	4
Aksyon Demokratiko	3
Laban ng Demokratikong Pilipino/Achievers with Integrity Movement	3
Pwersa ng Masang Pilipino/Achievers with Integrity Movement	3
Nationalist People's Coalition/PDP–Laban/Pwersa ng Masang Pilipino	2
Partido Demokratiko Sosyalista ng Pilipinas/Laban ng Demokratikong Pilipino	2
Achievers with Integrity Movement/Laban ng Demokratikong Pilipino	1
Alayon Alang sa Kalambu-an ng Kalinaw	1
Bayan Muna	1
Lakas–NUCD–UMDP/Achievers with Integrity Movement	1
Lakas–NUCD–UMDP/Hugpong sa Tawong Lungsod	1
Lakas–NUCD–UMDP/Partido Demokratiko Sosyalista ng Pilipinas	1
Laban ng Demokratikong Pilipino/Pwersa ng Masang Pilipino	1
Nationalist People's Coalition/PDP–Laban	1
Partido Demokratiko Sosyalista ng Pilipinas	1
Partido Demokratiko Sosyalista ng Pilipinas/Lakas–NUCD–UMDP	1
Partido para sa Demokratikong Reporma	1
Partido para sa Demokratikong Reporma/Hugpong sa Tawong Lungsod	1
PDP–Laban/Lakas–NUCD–UMDP	1
Pwersa ng Masang Pilipino/Nationalist People's Coalition/PDP–Laban	1
Pwersa ng Masang Pilipino/PDP–Laban	1
No party	3
Independents	25
Total	474
Source: Commission on Elections

The following are the results of the vice mayoral elections in highly urbanized and independent component cities and independent municipalities:

City/municipality	Elected seats	Party	Seats won
Angeles City	10	Lakas	6
Angeles City	10	NPC	4
Bacolod	12	Lakas	8
Bacolod	12	NPC	1
Bacolod	12	Independent	3
Baguio	12	Lakas	6
Baguio	12	LDP	2
Baguio	12	PDSP/LDP	2
Baguio	12	NPC	1
Baguio	12	PDSP	1
Butuan	10	Lakas	8
Butuan	10	PMP/PDP–Laban	1
Butuan	10	Independent	1
Cagayan de Oro	12	Lakas	10
Cagayan de Oro	12	PDP–Laban	1
Cagayan de Oro	12	Independent	1
Caloocan	12	Lakas	9
Caloocan	12	LDP	1
Caloocan	12	Liberal	1
Caloocan	12	NPC	1
Cebu City	16	Lakas	15
Cebu City	16	No party	1
Cotabato City	10	Lakas	4
Cotabato City	10	NPC/PDP–Laban/PMP	2
Cotabato City	10	PMP/NPC/PDP–Laban	1
Cotabato City	10	NPC/PDP–Laban	1
Cotabato City	10	PMP	1
Cotabato City	10	Independent	1
Dagupan	10	Lakas	7
Dagupan	10	Lakas/PDSP	1
Dagupan	10	LDP	1
Dagupan	10	PDSP/Lakas	1
Davao City	24	PDP–Laban	8
Davao City	24	Lakas	5
Davao City	24	NPC	3
Davao City	24	PMP	2
Davao City	24	Bayan Muna	1
Davao City	24	Lakas/Hugpong	1
Davao City	24	LDP	1
Davao City	24	PDP–Laban/LDP	1
Davao City	24	Reporma	1
Davao City	24	Reporma/Hugpong	1
General Santos	12	NPC/AIM	4
General Santos	12	LDP/AIM	3
General Santos	12	PMP/AIM	3
General Santos	12	AIM/LDP	1
General Santos	12	Lakas/AIM	1
Iligan	10	LDP	6
Iligan	10	Lakas	3
Iligan	10	NPC	1
Iloilo City	12	Lakas	8
Iloilo City	12	LDP	2
Iloilo City	12	Liberal	1
Iloilo City	12	NPC	1
Las Piñas	12	Lakas	12
Lucena	10	Lakas	5
Lucena	10	Liberal	5
Makati	16	PDP–Laban	11
Makati	16	Aksyon	1
Makati	16	LDP	1
Makati	16	Liberal	1
Makati	16	Independent	2
Malabon	12	Lakas	4
Malabon	12	LDP	4
Malabon	12	Liberal	3
Malabon	12	Independent	1
Mandaluyong	12	Lakas	11
Mandaluyong	12	Independent	1
Mandaue	10	Lakas	9
Mandaue	10	Alayon	1
Manila	36	Liberal	25
Manila	36	PDP–Laban	4
Manila	36	NPC	3
Manila	36	Lakas	1
Manila	36	No party	1
Manila	36	Independent	2
Marikina	12	Lakas	10
Marikina	12	PMP	2
Muntinlupa	16	Lakas	12
Muntinlupa	16	Liberal	2
Muntinlupa	16	Independent	2
Naga	10	Liberal	8
Naga	10	Independent	2
Navotas	12	Lakas	9
Navotas	12	PMP	2
Navotas	12	Independent	1
Olongapo	10	Lakas	9
Olongapo	10	Independent	1
Ormoc	10	Lakas	5
Ormoc	10	NPC	3
Ormoc	10	Aksyon	1
Ormoc	10	No party	1
Parañaque	16	Lakas	8
Parañaque	16	Kabatak	6
Parañaque	16	LDP	1
Parañaque	16	LDP/PMP	1
Pasay	12	Lakas	7
Pasay	12	LDP	5
Pasig	12	PDP–Laban	12
Pateros	12	Lakas	7
Pateros	12	Liberal	4
Pateros	12	Independent	1
Quezon City	24	Lakas	19
Quezon City	24	LDP	2
Quezon City	24	Aksyon	1
Quezon City	24	NPC	1
Quezon City	24	Independent	1
San Juan	12	PMP	11
San Juan	12	LDP	1
Santiago	10	LDP	4
Santiago	10	Lakas	2
Santiago	10	Independent	4
Taguig	12	KDT	10
Taguig	12	Liberal	2
Valenzuela	12	Lakas	5
Valenzuela	12	NPC	4
Valenzuela	12	LDP	3
Zamboanga City	12	LDP	9
Zamboanga City	12	Lakas	1
Zamboanga City	12	PMP	1
Zamboanga City	12	Independent	1
Source: Commission on Elections

=== Exit polls ===
During and immediately after the elections, exit polls were conducted by various organizations including the Social Weather Stations. According to "The SWS 2004 Day of Election Survey: Final Exit Poll Scores Excluding Blank Answers", released by the SWS on May 19, 2004, the national vote percentages are: GMA 45%, FPJ 34%, Lacson 10%, Roco 6%, Villanueva 5% (slightly different numbers from May 11; error margin 2%, n = 4,445)."

These results are affirmed when compared to the NAMFREL Quick Count as of May 21, as tabulated in "Comparison of ABS-CBN/SWS Exit Poll 2004 Results (as of May 17, 9 am; excluding No Answer) and NAMFREL Quick Count as of May 21 1:00 p.m. (Report #63)". The NAMFREL Quick Count shows GMA at 40.4%, FPJ at 36.5%, Lacson at 10.8%, Roco at 6.2%, and Villanueva at 6.1%.

It is notable in light of the subsequent Hello Garci scandal how exit polling revealed the candidates' performance in the Autonomous Region in Muslim Mindanao. To wit, the SWS exit poll shows that GMA won only 44% of ARMM while FPJ won 50% (in short, 44–50); the NAMFREL Quick Count showed a score of 34.3–56.5. However, the final official COMELEC Canvass showed a result of 62% vs. 31% in favor of Gloria Macapagal Arroyo. This highly irregular result constituted prima facie evidence of cheating in the ARMM.

The SWS also published the number of registered voters per region as of April 28, 2004—or just a week before the elections—for the purpose of comparing their sample sizes with the actual number of voters. The ARMM had 1,057,458 voters.

However, recall that in the final official COMELEC canvass, FPJ won 31% of ARMM votes. If he had won 100% of ARMM, he could gain only 69% more of the ARMM voters, or 729,646 votes. Given that the final difference between GMA and FPJ was 1,123,576 votes, GMA would still have won the election by a total of 393,930 votes.

Hypothetically, if FPJ won 100% of the ARMM, GMA would still have won. GMA's lead was successful, that even if they padded ARMM voter rolls so that it would present 1.5 million voters, 69% of that would only be 1.035 million votes, still not enough to overcome the 1.123-million vote lead.

This result is actually consistent with the trend of the pre-election opinion polls conducted also by the SWS. On April 23, just a little over two weeks before the election, the SWS released a poll, and the headline of the SWS report by itself was historically significant: "SWS April 10–17, 2004 Survey: Roco Depleted, Voters Go To GMA and Undecided". The report's first line gives away the game: "Raul Roco's sudden departure for abroad cost him almost half of his voting strength, allowing Gloria Macapagal Arroyo to gain a slim lead ..." That lead could not be reversed: at the last pre-election SWS opinion poll (conducted from May 1 to 4) released on May 8, 2004, or just two days before the election, "GMA Leads FPJ By 7%", 37% to 30%, with 12% undecided.

=== Official Congressional canvass ===
Under the constitution, the Congress is mandated to become the National Board of Canvassers for the top two positions, the president and the vice-president. Tallying in the 216,382 precincts nationwide are submitted in Election Returns that are forwarded to the municipal and city board of canvassers. These are then tabulated and forwarded to the provincial board of canvassers which prepare the 176 Certificates of Canvass (CoC). These CoCs were forwarded to the joint session of the Congress at the Batasang Pambansa in Quezon City on May 25, 2004.

Senators and representatives from the administration and opposition have debated heatedly on the procedure of counting the CoCs. The traditional way of counting the certificates, as used in the 1992 and 1998 elections, was to appoint a joint committee consisting of seven senators and seven representatives. Many opposition legislators, notably, Cong. Didagen Dilangalen of Maguindanao, opposed this traditional method as unconstitutional saying that it should be the whole Congress, not a committee, who should count the votes. Part of the argument was that "power delegated cannot be further delegated", referring to the delegation of counting to a committee. The proposal of some legislators was for the whole Congress to sit in a joint session counting each and every single Certificate of Canvass.

The debates and deliberations for the rules of canvassing were finished by the Congressional joint session on May 28. The rules decided were very similar to the ones used in the 1992 and 1998 elections, which called for a joint committee to act as the National Board of Canvassers. The notable difference is the increase of the number of committee members from 14 to 22, this time consisting of 11 senators and 11 representatives. The composition of the committee was also announced by the senate president, Franklin Drilon, and the Speaker of the House, Jose de Venecia. The composition was immediately lambasted by the Opposition; the House portion of the committee consisted of 9 administration representatives and 2 opposition. The Poe camp called for a more equal representation for all the involved political parties in the committee, despite the appointed commission mirroring the current composition of the House: there are 190 administration representatives in a 220-seat House.

The official canvassing by the Congressional Joint Committee started on June 4, a little less than one month after election day. Canvassing was done in a slow pace, averaging about 12 Certificates of Canvass per day, as the Opposition accused Administration politicians of railroading the canvass. The Opposition lawyers wanted to question the validity of 25 CoCs, especially in those areas where Arroyo posted a wide margin over Poe. They wanted the committee to examine the Statement of Votes at the municipal level and even down to the Election Returns at the precinct level to prove their claim that the Certificates of Canvass have been tampered with in favor of Arroyo. Administration lawyers contend that the committee is not the proper place to lodge complaints of fraud and that the Opposition should go to the Presidential Election Tribunal (the Supreme Court) after the winner has been proclaimed.

== See also ==
- Commission on Elections
- Politics of the Philippines
- Philippine elections
- President of the Philippines
- 13th Congress of the Philippines

== Literature ==
- Teehankee, Julio (2006). Consolidation or Crisis of Clientelistic Democracy?: The 2004 Synchronized Elections in the Philippines. Berlin: Lit. pp. 215–276.
