= 2007 Philippine House of Representatives elections =

21st Philippine House of Representatives elections

- May 14, 2007
- All 270 seats in the House of Representatives; 136 seats needed for a majority
- Congressional district elections
- All 218 seats from congressional districts
Party	Seats	+/–
Lakas	89	−3
KAMPI	44	+42
NPC	28	−25
Liberal	23	−6
Nacionalista	11	+9
LDP	5	−10
PDP–Laban	5	+3
PMP	4	−1
PDSP	3	+2
KBL	1	0
Others	5	+1
This lists parties that won seats. See the complete results below.
- Party-list election
- All 53 seats under the party-list system
Party	Vote %	Seats	+/–
Buhay	7.30	3	+1
Bayan Muna	6.11	3	0
CIBAC	4.72	2	0
Gabriela	3.88	2	0
APEC	3.87	2	−1
A TEACHER	3.06	2	+2
Akbayan	2.91	2	−1
Alagad	2.64	2	+1
Coop-NATCCO	2.56	2	+1
Butil	2.55	2	0
ARC	2.34	2	+2
Anakpawis	2.31	2	0
Anak Mindanao	2.17	2	+1
Abono	2.12	2	+2
YACAP	2.07	2	+2
AGAP	2.05	2	+2
An Waray	2.01	1	0
Others	22.85	18	+15
This lists parties that won seats. See the complete results below.
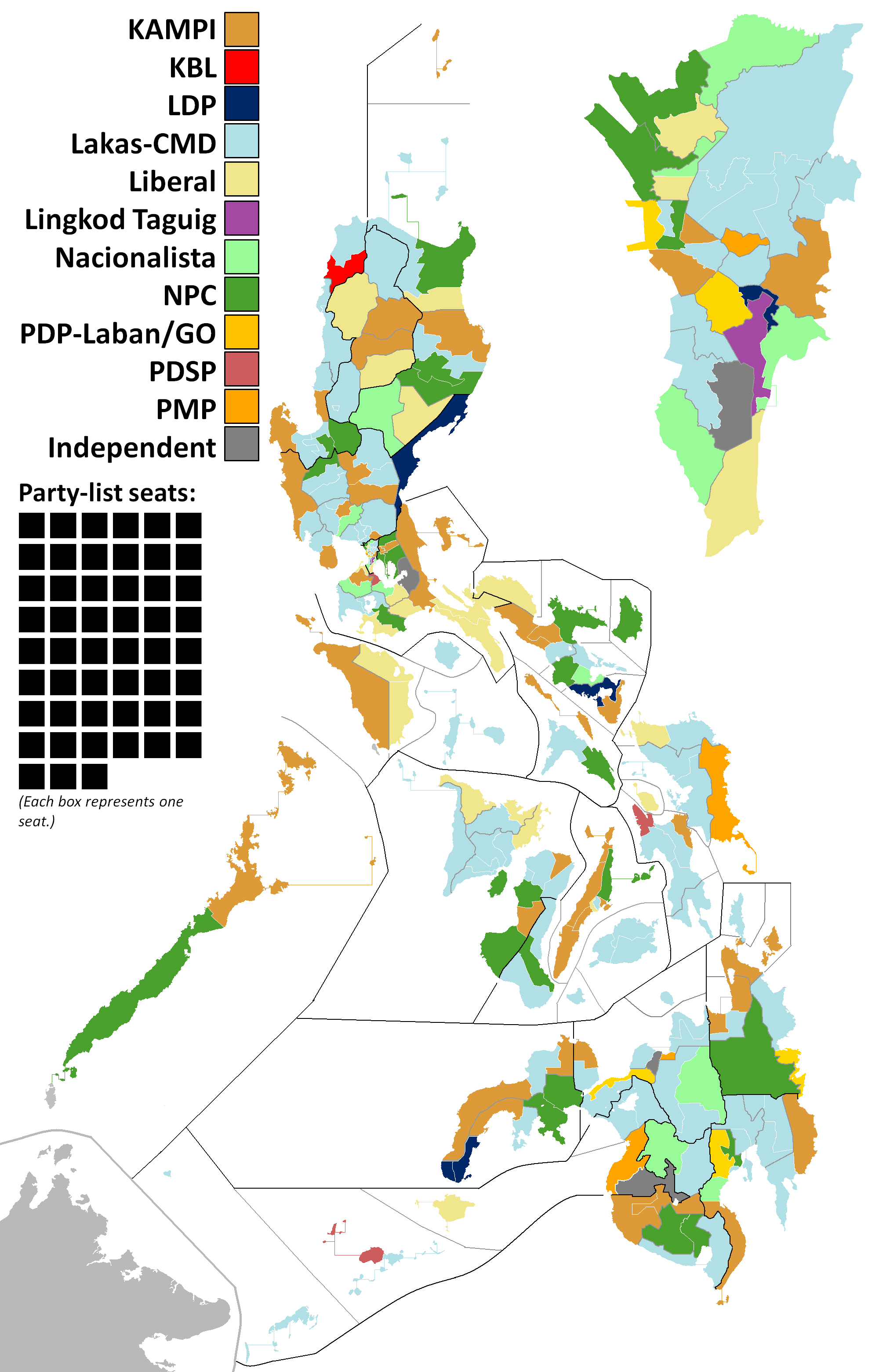
Speaker before	Speaker after
Jose de Venecia Jr. Lakas	Jose de Venecia Jr. Lakas

Elections for the House of Representatives of the Philippines were held on May 14, 2007, to elect members to the House of Representatives of the Philippines to serve in the 14th Congress of the Philippines from June 30, 2007, until June 30, 2010. The Philippines uses parallel voting for seats in the House of Representatives.

The administration-led TEAM Unity maintained control of the House of Representatives although the opposition-backed Genuine Opposition won control of the Senate. Incumbent Speaker Jose de Venecia Jr. of Pangasinan was elected Speaker after being the only one nominated: 186 voted for De Venecia, 1 against (Eduardo Joson) and 24 abstentions.

== Electoral system ==
The House of Representatives shall have not more than 250 members, unless otherwise fixed by law, of which 20% shall be elected via the party-list system, while the rest are elected via congressional districts.

In this election, there are 218 seats voted via first-past-the-post in single-member districts. Each province, and a city with a population of 250,000, is guaranteed a seat, with more populous provinces and cities divided into two or more districts.

Congress has the power of redistricting three years after each census.

As there are 218 congressional districts, there shall be 53 seats available under the party-list system. A party has to cross the 2% electoral threshold to win a guaranteed seat. Next, the court ruled that the first-placed party should always have more seats than the other parties, and that the prior 2%–4%–6% method will only be used for the first-placed party. As for parties that got 2% of the vote but did not have the most votes, they will automatically have one more seat, then any extra seats will be determined via dividing their votes to the number of votes of the party with the most votes, then the quotient will be multiplied by the number of seats the party with the most votes has. The product, disregarding decimals (it is not rounded), will be the number of seats a party will get.

The Supreme Court ruled the 2% electoral threshold as unconstitutional in 2009, which then allocated a new way to allocate seats.

== Redistricting ==
Reapportioning (redistricting) the number of seats is either via national reapportionment three years after the release of every census, or via piecemeal redistricting for every province or city. National reapportionment has not happened since the 1987 constitution took effect, and aside from piecemeal redistricting, the apportionment was based on the ordinance from the constitution, which was in turn based from the 1980 census.

For this election, 7 new districts were added, with 1 from the 10th Congress, 1 from the immediately preceding 12th Congress, and 5 from the outgoing 13th Congress. Cagayan de Oro, Dinagat Islands, Marikina, Sultan Kudarat, Taguig–Pateros, Zamboanga City and Zamboanga Sibugay all increased their number of districts by one each.

=== Changes from previous congresses ===
- Division of Taguig–Pateros's at-large district to two districts:
  - Taguig attains cityhood, and its western barangays and Pateros becomes the 1st district.
  - Taguig's eastern barangays becomes the 2nd district.
  - Enacted into law as Republic Act No. 8487.
  - Defeated in a plebiscite on April 25, 1998.
  - Declaration of result of plebiscite nullified by the Supreme Court, ordered the Commission on Elections to handle the case.
  - Announced as being approved after recount on December 8, 2004.
- Division of Zamboanga City's at-large district to two districts
  - Zamboanga City's western barangays becomes the 1st district.
  - The eastern barangays becomes the 2nd district.
  - Enacted into law as Republic Act No. 9269.

=== Changes from the outgoing Congress ===
- Creation of Dinagat Islands province
  - This created the province of Dinagat Islands from the municipalities of Surigao del Norte's 1st district wholly located in Dinagat Island.
  - Enacted into law as Republic Act No. 9355.
  - Approved in a plebiscite on December 2, 2006.
- Division of Sultan Kudarat's at-large district to two districts
  - Sultan Kudarat's eastern municipalities and Tacurong becomes the 1st district.
  - The western municipalities becomes the 2nd district.
  - Enacted into law as Republic Act No. 9357.
- Division of Zamboanga SIbugay's at-large district to two districts
  - Zamboanga Sibugay's municipalities bordering Zamboanga del Sur except Kabasalan becomes the 1st district.
  - The municipalities bordering Zamboanga del Norte becomes the 2nd district.
  - Enacted into law as Republic Act No. 9360.
- Division of Marikina's at-large district to two districts
  - Marikina's southwestern barangays becomes the 1st district.
  - The northeastern barangays becoming the 2nd district.
  - Enacted into law as Republic Act No. 9364.
- Division of Cagayan de Oro's at-large district to two districts
  - Cagayan de Oro's barangays to the west of the Cagayan River becomes the 1st district.
  - The barangays to the east of the river becomes the 2nd district.
  - Enacted into law as Republic Act No. 9371.

=== Summary of changes ===
As there were 218 seats from congressional districts, and since the constitution requires that there should be 1 party-list seat for every 4 seats from congressional districts, this means there were 53 party-list seats up for this election, or for a total of 270 seats.

Category	Total
Congressional districts in the outgoing Congress	211
New districts from redistricting laws from previous congresses	2
New districts from redistricting laws from outgoing Congress	5
Congressional districts in the next Congress	218
Party-list seats for the next Congress	53
Total seats for the next Congress	270

== Campaign ==
=== Genuine Opposition ===
The Genuine Opposition (GO) targeted to win at least 80 seats to be able to impeach President Gloria Macapagal Arroyo; however the administration's TEAM Unity prevented GO in winning several of those seats by fielding in strong candidates against GO in those districts.

=== Lakas vs. KAMPI ===
The administration's two main parties, Lakas-CMD and Kabalikat ng Malayang Pilipino (KAMPI), was seen to win majority of the seats, with most contests contested by the two parties. This inevitably produced a split in the administration ranks on who would be their candidate for Speaker in the impending victory. However, the two parties were united in supporting President Arroyo and were able to prevent any impeachment proceeding against her or her allies from reaching the Senate.

Lakas-CMD party leader and House Speaker Jose de Venecia was challenged by KAMPI's Pablo P. Garcia for the speakership in the incoming 14th Congress of the Philippines which has caused a battle between administration allies. Recently, Garcia was accused by Parañaque 1st District Rep. Eduardo Zialcita and Manila 6th District Rep. Bienvenido Abante, Jr. both under the party Lakas-CMD of using Government Service Insurance System or GSIS pension funds care of Garcia's son GSIS Vice-Chairman, General Manager and President Winston Garcia to bribe congressmen of PHP 300,000 to 400,000 to support his father's speakership bid.

== Retiring and term limited incumbents ==
=== Lakas-CMD ===
- Agusan del Norte's 1st District: Leovigildo Banaag: Term-limited in 2007
- Agusan del Norte's 2nd District: Ma. Angelica Rosedell Amante
- Albay's 3rd District: Joey Salceda: Term-limited in 2007, ran and won as Governor of Albay
- Basilan's Lone District: Gerry Salapuddin: Term-limited in 2007
- Bohol's 3rd District: Eladio Jala: Term-limited in 2007
- Bukidnon's 3rd District: Juan Miguel Zubiri: Term-limited in 2007, ran and won as Senator. However, replaced by Koko Pimentel in 2011
- Bulacan's 1st District: Wilhelmino Sy-Alvarado: Term-limited in 2007, ran and won as Vice Governor of Bulacan
- Cagayan de Oro City's Lone District: Constantino Jaraula: Term-limited in 2007, ran and won as Mayor of Cagayan de Oro
- Cebu's 4th District: Clavel Martinez: Term-limited in 2007, ran and lost as Vice Governor of Cebu
- Compostela Valley's 2nd District: Prospero Amatong: Term-limited in 2007
- Davao del Norte's 2nd District: Antonio Floirendo, Jr.: Term-limited in 2007
- Ilocos Sur's 1st District: Salacnib Baterina: Term-limited in 2007
- Leyte's 3rd District: Eduardo Veloso: Term-limited in 2007
- Mandaluyong's Lone District: Benjamin Abalos, Jr.: Ran and won as Mayor of Mandaluyong
- Manila's 1st District: Ernesto Nieva: Term-limited in 2007
- Marinduque's Lone District: Edmundo Reyes, Jr.: Term-limited in 2007
- Pasig's Lone District: Robert "Dodot" Jaworski, Jr.: Ran and lost in the Mayoralty race in Pasig
- San Jose del Monte City's Lone District: Eduardo Roquero: Ran and won as Mayor of San Jose del Monte City
- Siquijor's Lone District: Orlando Fua, Jr.: Term-limited in 2007, ran and won as Governor of Siquijor
- Sulu's 1st District: Hussin Amin: Term-limited in 2007
- Surigao del Norte's 2nd District: Ace Barbers: Term-limited in 2007, ran and won as Governor of Surigao del Norte
- Surigao del Sur's 1st District: Prospero Pichay: Term-limited in 2007, ran and lost in the Senatorial race
- Valenzuela City's 1st District: Jose Emmanuel Carlos: Ran and lost in the Mayoralty race in Valenzuela City

=== Kabalikat ng Malayang Pilipino ===
- Antipolo City's 2nd District: Victor Sumulong: Term-limited in 2007, ran and won as Mayor of Antipolo City
- Batangas 4th District: Oscar Gozos: Ran and won as Mayor of Lipa
- Davao Oriental's 1st District: Corazon Malanyaon: Ran and won as Governor of Davao Oriental
- La Union's 2nd District: Tomas Dumpit: Term-limited in 2007
- Misamis Oriental's 2nd District: Augusto Baculio: Term-limited in 2007
- Pangasinan's 2nd District: Amado Espino, Jr.: Ran and won as Governor of Pangasinan
- Pangasinan's 3rd District: Generoso Tulagan: Term-limited in 2007
- Pasay City's Lone District: Consuelo Dy: Ran and lost in the Mayoralty race in Pasay

=== Kilusang Bagong Lipunan ===
- Ilocos Norte's 1st District: Imee Marcos: Term-limited in 2007

=== Laban ng Demokratikong Filipino ===
- Iloilo's 5th District: Rolex Suplico: Term-limited in 2007, ran and won as Vice Governor of Iloilo
- Makati's 2nd District: Agapito Aquino: Term-limited in 2007
- Negros Oriental's 1st District: Jacinto Paras: Term-limited in 2007
- Nueva Vizcaya's Lone District: Rodolfo Agbayani: Ran and lost as Governor of Nueva Vizcaya

=== Liberal Party ===
- Bataan's 1st District: Antonio Roman: Term-limited in 2007
- Bukidnon's 1st District: J.R. Nereus Acosta: Term-limited in 2007
- Kalinga's Lone District: Lawrence Wacnang: Term-limited in 2007
- Laguna's 3rd District: Danton Bueser: Term-limited in 2007, ran and lost in the Mayoralty race in San Pablo
- Malabon-Navotas's Lone District: Federico Sandoval: Term-limited in 2007, ran and lost in the Mayoral race in Navotas
- Manila's 4th District: Rodolfo Bacani: Term-limited in 2007, ran and lost in the Mayoralty race in Manila
- Northern Samar's 1st District: Harlin Abayon: Term-limited in 2007
- Quezon's 1st District: Rafael Nantes: Term-limited in 2007, ran and won as Governor of Quezon
- Tarlac's 2nd District: Benigno Aquino III: Term-limited in 2007, ran and won in the Senatorial race

=== Nacionalista Party ===
- Manila's 5th District: Joey Hizon: Term-limited in 2007, ran and lost in the Vice Mayoral race in Manila
- Taguig City-Pateros's Lone District: Alan Peter Cayetano: Term-limited in 2007, ran and won in the Senatorial race

=== Nationalist People's Coalition ===
- Apayao's Lone District: Elias Bulut, Jr.: Term-limited in 2007, ran and won as Governor
- Cagayan's 1st District: Juan Ponce Enrile, Jr.: Term-limited in 2007
- Caloocan's 2nd District: Luis Asistio: Ran and lost in the Mayoralty race in Caloocan
- Camiguin's Lone District: Jurdin Jesus Romualdo: Term-limited in 2007, ran and won as Governor
- Cebu's 2nd District: Simeon Kintanar: Term-limited in 2007
- Cebu's 3rd District: Antonio Yapha: Term-limited in 2007
- Cotabato's 2nd District: Gregorio Ipong: Term-limited in 2007
- Davao City's 3rd District: Ruy Elias Lopez: Term-limited in 2007
- Davao del Sur's 1st District: Douglas Cagas: Term-limited in 2007, ran and won as Governor
- Laguna's 1st District: Uliran Joaquin: Term-limited in 2007, ran and lost in the Mayoralty race in San Pedro, Laguna
- Lanao del Norte's 1st District: Alipio Badelles: Term-limited in 2007
- Lanao del Sur's 2nd District: Benansing Macarambong: Term-limited in 2007
- Masbate's 2nd District: Emilio Espinosa: Term-limited in 2007
- Negros Occidental's 4th District: Carlos Cojuangco: Term-limited in 2007
- Negros Oriental's 2nd District: Emilio Macias: Term-limited in 2007, ran and won as Governor
- Nueva Ecija's 1st District: Josefina Joson: Term-limited in 2007
- Pampanga's 1st District: Francis Nepomuceno: Term-limited in 2007, ran and won as Mayor of Angeles City
- Rizal's 2nd District: Isidro Rodriguez, Jr.: Term-limited in 2007
- Sorsogon's 1st District: Francis "Chiz" Escudero: Term-limited in 2007, ran and won in the Senatorial Race
- Tarlac's 1st District: Gilbert Teodoro: Term-limited in 2007, later appointed as Secretary of the Department of National Defense
- Zamboanga del Norte's 2nd District: Roseller Barinaga: Term-limited in 2007, ran and lost in the Mayoralty race in Dipolog City

== Results ==
=== District elections results ===
District representatives are allocated 80% of the seats in the House:

Party	Seats	+/–
Lakas–CMD	89	−3
Kabalikat ng Malayang Pilipino	44	+42
Nationalist People's Coalition	28	−25
Liberal Party	23	−6
Nacionalista Party	11	+9
Laban ng Demokratikong Pilipino	5	−10
PDP–Laban	5	+3
Pwersa ng Masang Pilipino	4	−1
Partido Demokratiko Sosyalista ng Pilipinas	3	+2
Kilusang Bagong Lipunan	1	0
Lingkod Taguig	1	New
Independent	4	0
Party-list seats	53	+1
Total	271	+10

=== Party-list election result ===
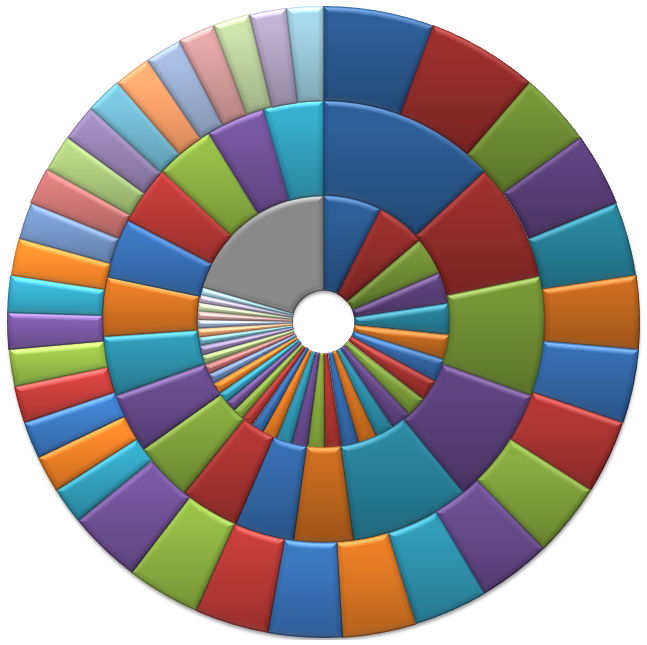
Result of the Philippine House of Representatives party-list election. Proportion of votes (inner ring) as compared to proportion of seats (according to VFP vs. COMELEC, middle ring; final allocation according to BANAT vs. COMELEC, outer ring) of the political parties. Parties that did not win any seat are represented by a gray pie slice.

Party-list representatives are allocated 20% of the seats in the House; however, due to the 2% threshold and the 3-seat cap rule, the 20% requirement was not met. On the 2009 BANAT vs. COMELEC decision of the Supreme Court, it declared the 2% threshold unconstitutional; instead it mandated that parties surpassing the 2% threshold automatically having seats, then allocating one seat for every party with less than 2% of the vote until the 20% allocation was met. With the formula used, this meant that the party with the highest number of votes usually gets three seats, the other parties with 2% or more of the vote winning two seats, and parties with less than 2% of the vote getting one seat.

Party	Votes	%	+/–	Seats	+/–
Buhay Party-List	1,169,338	7.62	+1.75	3	+1
Bayan Muna (Note: Proclaimed to have won an additional seat on April 24, 2009 by virtue of a Supreme Court ruling nullifying certain provisions of the Party-List Law as unconstitutional.)	979,189	6.38	−3.35	3	0
Citizens' Battle Against Corruption	755,735	4.93	+0.83	2	0
Gabriela Women's Party	621,266	4.05	+0.23	2	0
APEC Partylist	619,733	4.04	−3.48	2	−1
A Teacher Partylist	490,853	3.20	New	2	New
Akbayan	466,448	3.04	−3.79	2	−1
Alagad	423,165	2.76	−0.04	2	+1
Coop-NATCCO	409,987	2.67	+0.43	2	+1
Butil Farmers Party	409,168	2.67	−0.82	2	0
Alliance of Rural Concerns	374,349	2.44	New	2	New
Anakpawis	370,323	2.41	−1.92	2	0
Anak Mindanao	347,527	2.27	+0.05	2	+1
Abono	340,002	2.22	New	2	New
You Against Corruption and Poverty	331,623	2.16	New	2	New
AGAP Partylist	328,814	2.14	New	2	New
An Waray	321,516	2.10	−0.10	2	+1
United Movement Against Drug (Note: Proclaimed have a seat on April 24, 2009 by virtue of a Supreme Court ruling nullifying certain provisions of the Party-List Law as unconstitutional.)	251,804	1.64	New	1	New
Arts, Business and Science Professionals	235,152	1.53	New	1	New
Ang Laban ng Indiginong Filipino	229,267	1.49	−0.68	1	0
Kapatiran ng mga na Kulong na Walang Sala	229,036	1.49	New	1	New
Kabataan	228,700	1.49	−0.24	1	New
ABA AKO Partylist	219,363	1.43	−0.61	1	New
Senior Citizens Partylist	213,095	1.39	−0.53	1	New
Aangat Tayo	200,030	1.30	New	1	New
Veterans Freedom Party	196,358	1.28	−1.45	1	0
Alliance for Nationalism and Democracy	188,573	1.23	−0.74	1	0
Barangay Natin	177,068	1.15	−0.33	1	New
Kasangga sa Kaunlaran	170,594	1.11	New	1	New
Bantay Partylist	169,869	1.11	+0.73	1	New
Abakada Guro	166,897	1.09	New	1	New
1-United Transport Coalition	165,012	1.08	New	1	New
Trade Union Congress Party	162,678	1.06	−0.56	1	New
Philippine Coconut Producers Federation	156,007	1.02	−0.32	1	New
AGHAM Partylist	146,062	0.95	New	0	0
Angat Ating Kabuhayan Pilipinas	141,860	0.92	New	0	0
Abanse! Pinay	130,649	0.85	−0.09	0	0
Partido ng Manggagawa	119,082	0.78	−2.78	0	−1
Suara Bangsamoro	114,024	0.74	−0.58	0	0
Assalam Bangsamoro People's Party	113,966	0.74	−0.01	0	0
Alliance of Volunteer Educators	111,002	0.72	−2.01	0	0
Democratic Independent Workers Association	107,193	0.70	New	0	0
Alliance of Neo-Conservatives	99,658	0.65	New	0	0
Sanlakas	97,425	0.64	−0.88	0	0
Alliance for Barangay Concerns	90,125	0.59	New	0	0
Kalahi-Advocates for Overseas Filipinos	89,461	0.58	New	0	0
Ahonbayan	80,932	0.53	−0.03	0	0
Akbay Pinoy OFW-National	79,460	0.52	New	0	0
Biyaheng Pinoy	78,716	0.51	New	0	0
Bigkis Pinoy Movement	77,351	0.50	−0.98	0	0
People's Movement Against Poverty	75,230	0.49	−0.67	0	0
Alyansa ng May Kapansanang Pinoy	74,704	0.49	−0.21	0	0
PBA Partylist	72,395	0.47	New	0	0
Confederation of Grains Retailers Association of the Philippines	62,247	0.41	+0.12	0	0
Bagong Tao Movement	61,089	0.40	−0.04	0	0
Novelty Entrepreneurship and Livelihood For Food	58,773	0.38	+0.10	0	0
SMILE Partylist	58,772	0.38	−0.68	0	0
Aksyon Sambayanan	57,032	0.37	New	0	0
Bago National Cultural Society of the Philippines	55,852	0.36	New	0	0
Bandila Partylist	54,779	0.36	New	0	0
Ahon Pinoy	54,628	0.36	New	0	0
Advocates for Special Children and the Handicapped Movement	51,805	0.34	New	0	0
Agbiag	50,878	0.33	New	0	0
Seaman's Party	50,605	0.33	−0.32	0	0
Action for Dynamic Development	48,665	0.32	New	0	0
Bahandi Sa Kaumahan Ug Kadagatan	46,640	0.30	−0.19	0	0
Asosasyon ng mga Maliliit na Negosyanteng Gumaganap	43,154	0.28	New	0	0
Alay sa Bayan ng Malayang Propesyonal at Repormang Kalakal	42,308	0.28	New	0	0
Babae Para sa Kaunlaran	36,531	0.24	New	0	0
Sulong! Barangay Movement	34,893	0.23	New	0	0
Alyansa ng Sambayanan Para sa Pagbabago	34,117	0.22	−0.18	0	0
Parents Enabling Parents Coalition Party	34,054	0.22	+0.21	0	0
Abante Ilonggo	33,928	0.22	New	0	0
Alliance of Vendors and Traders of the Philippines	33,726	0.22	New	0	0
Action for Democracy and Development for the Tribal People	33,209	0.22	New	0	0
Alyansa ng Mamamayang Naghihirap	32,270	0.21	New	0	0
Angat Antas Kabuhayan Pilipino Movement	29,190	0.19	New	0	0
Association of Administrators Professionals and Seniors	26,305	0.17	New	0	0
Hanay ng Aping Pinoy	25,947	0.17	New	0	0
Sandigang Maralita	23,239	0.15	+0.09	0	0
Alliance of Associations of Accredited Workers in the Water Sector	22,963	0.15	New	0	0
Ang Galing Pinoy	16,975	0.11	New	0	0
Aging Pilipino Organization	16,759	0.11	−0.12	0	0
Alliance of People's Organization	16,442	0.11	New	0	0
Biyayang Bukid	16,286	0.11	New	0	0
Alliance Transport Sector	14,196	0.09	New	0	0
Union of the Masses for Democracy and Justice	9,624	0.06	New	0	0
Kabukluran ng mga Kababaihang Filipina sa Timog Katagalugan	8,930	0.06	New	0	0
Youth League for Peace Advancement	8,495	0.06	New	0	0
Kasosyo Producer-Consumer Exchange Association	8,422	0.05	New	0	0
Koalisyon ng Katutubong Samahan ng Pilipinas	6,246	0.04	New	0	0
Total	15,337,808	100.00	–	53	+25
Valid votes	16,024,795	53.32	+17.49		
Invalid/blank votes (Note: Includes 385,956 votes for BATAS Partylist, which the Commission on Elections (COMELEC) cancelled its registration on November 19, 2007, and 301,031 votes for FPJPM Partylist which the COMELEC cancelled its registration on July 1, 2008)	14,031,900	46.68	−17.49		
Total votes	30,056,695	100.00	–		
Registered voters/turnout	43,180,216	69.61	−9.53		
Source: COMELEC

== Media websites ==
- Halalan 2007 - Election coverage by ABS-CBN
- Eleksyon 2007 - Election coverage by GMA Network
- Eleksyon 2007 - Election coverage by the Philippine Daily Inquirer
