= Alliance for Rural Concerns =

Political party in the Philippines

The Alliance for Rural Concerns is a political party in the Philippines. In the 14 May 2007 election, the party won 1 seat in the nationwide party-list vote.

== Electoral performance ==
Election	Votes	%	Seats
2007	374,288	2.35%	2
2010	57,515	0.20%	0
2013	45,009	0.16%	0

== Representatives to Congress ==
Period	1st Representative	2nd Representative
14th Congress; 2007–2010	Narciso D. Santiago III	Oscar D. Francisco
15th Congress; 2010–2013	Out of Congress	
16th Congress; 2013–2016	Out of Congress	
