= 13th Congress of the Philippines =

34th legislative term of the Philippines

←	12th	14th	→
- GSIS Building (2010) (top) and Batasang Pambansa Complex (2010) (bottom)

Overview
- Term: July 26, 2004 – June 8, 2007
- President: Gloria Macapagal Arroyo
- Vice President: Noli de Castro

Senate
- Members: 24
- President: Franklin Drilon (until July 24, 2006); Manny Villar (from July 24, 2006)
- President pro tempore: Juan Flavier
- Majority leader: Francis Pangilinan
- Minority leader: Aquilino Pimentel Jr.

House of Representatives
- Members: 261
- Speaker: Jose de Venecia Jr.
- Deputy Speakers: Emilio Espinosa Jr.; Raul del Mar; Abdulgani Salapuddin; Benigno Aquino III (October 27, 2004 – February 21, 2006); Eric Singson (from February 21, 2006)
- Majority leader: Prospero Nograles
- Minority leader: Francis Escudero

The 13th Congress of the Philippines (Filipino: Ikalabintatlong Kongreso ng Pilipinas), composed of the Philippine Senate and House of Representatives, met from July 26, 2004, until June 8, 2007, during the fourth, fifth, and sixth years of Gloria Macapagal Arroyo's presidency. The convening of the 13th Congress followed the 2004 national elections, which replaced half of the Senate membership and the entire membership of the House of Representatives.

== Events ==
=== Charter change ===
President Gloria Macapagal Arroyo, in her several State of the Nation Addresses has repeatedly called on Congress to pave the way for the amending of the 1987 Constitution to provide for a unicameral–parliamentary–federal form of government. On December 8, 2006, the administration-dominated House of Representatives, bypassing the Senate, passed in haste House Resolution 1450, which called on Congress to convene into a Constituent Assembly (ConAss) to propose amendments to the Constitution. The House move however, was faced with stiff opposition from the outmaneuvered members of the opposition and all but 1 member of the Senate, which was later bolstered by support from several sectors of the civil society and the influential Roman Catholic Church, which threatened to hold nationwide protest rallies to denounce the House move. Succumbing to the mounting opposition and the apparent withdrawal of support of the President, House Speaker Jose De Venecia later on scrapped the entire resolution and called instead for a constitutional convention, challenging the Senate to concur it in 72 hours. But this too was rejected by the Senate, which preferred to hold a constitutional convention after the 2007 elections. Efforts to amend the constitution during the 13th Congress were eventually shelved.

== Sessions ==
- First Regular Session: July 26, 2004 – June 7, 2005
  - First Special Session: January 5 – February 10, 2005
  - Second Special Session: March 1 – April 1, 2005
- Second Regular Session: July 25, 2005 – June 5, 2006
- Third Regular Session: July 24, 2006 – June 8, 2007
  - Third Special Session: February 19 – 20, 2007
  - Special Centennial Session: June 7, 2007

== Legislation ==
Laws passed by the 13th Congress: 149 (Republic Act No. 9333 to 9495), as of September 7, 2007

=== Major legislation ===
- Republic Act No. 9334 — Increase of Excise Tax on Alcohol and Tobacco Products
- Republic Act No. 9335 — Attrition Act of 2005
- Republic Act No. 9337 — Expanded Value-Added Tax Law
- Republic Act No. 9341 — Rent Control Act of 2005
- Republic Act No. 9343 — Special Purpose Vehicle Act of 2002 Amendments
- Republic Act No. 9344 — Juvenile Justice and Welfare Act of 2006
- Republic Act No. 9346 — Death Penalty Abolition
- Republic Act No. 9347 — Rationalizing the Composition and Functions of the National Labor Relations Commission
- Republic Act No. 9359 — Appropriation of a Standby Fund for the Guimaras Oil Spill Clean Up, Mayon Volcano Relief Operations, OFW Repatriation
- Republic Act No. 9367 — Biofuels Act of 2006
- Republic Act No. 9369 — Amending the Election Modernization Act
- Republic Act No. 9372 — Human Security Act of 2007
- Republic Act No. 9379 — Handline Fishing Law
- Republic Act No. 9396 — Redefining the term "Veteran"
- Republic Act No. 9399 — One-Time Amnesty for Businesses in the Special Economic Zones and Freeports
- Republic Act No. 9400 — Amending the Bases Conversion and Development Act of 1992
- Republic Act No. 9406 — Reorganization and Strengthening of the Public Attorney's Office
- Republic Act No. 9416 — Unlawful Cheating in the Civil Service Commission Examinations
- Republic Act No. 9417 — Strengthening the Office of the Solicitor General
- Republic Act No. 9418 — Institutionalizing Strategy for Rural Development
- Republic Act No. 9422 — Amending the Migration Workers and Overseas Act of 1995
- Republic Act No. 9433 — Magna Carta for Public Social Workers

== Leadership ==
=== Senate ===
Senate President

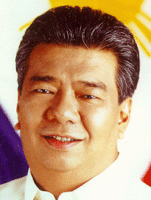
Franklin Drilon,
until July 24, 2006

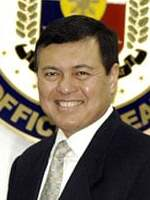
Manny Villar,
from July 24, 2006

- President:
  - Franklin Drilon (Liberal), until July 24, 2006
  - Manny Villar (Nacionalista), from July 24, 2006
- President pro tempore: Juan Flavier (Lakas)
- Majority Floor Leader: Francis Pangilinan (Liberal)
- Minority Floor Leader: Nene Pimentel (PDP–Laban)

=== House of Representatives ===
House Speaker

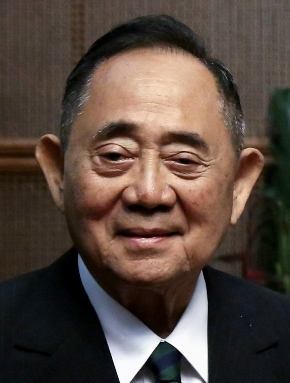
Jose de Venecia Jr.

- Speaker: Jose de Venecia Jr. (Pangasinan–4th, Lakas)
- Deputy Speakers:
  - Luzon:
    - Emilio Espinosa Jr. (Masbate–2nd, INA/NPC)
    - Benigno Aquino III (Tarlac–2nd, Liberal), October 27, 2004 – February 21, 2006
    - Eric Singson (Ilocos Sur–2nd, Liberal), from February 21, 2006
  - Visayas: Raul del Mar (Cebu City–1st, Lakas)
  - Mindanao: Abdulgani Salapuddin (Basilan–Lone, Lakas)
- Majority Floor Leader: Prospero Nograles (Davao City–1st, Lakas)
- Minority Floor Leader: Francis Escudero (Sorsogon–1st, NPC)

== Members ==
=== Senate ===
Final Senate composition.

The following are the terms of the senators of this Congress, according to the date of election:

- For senators elected on May 14, 2001: June 30, 2001 – June 30, 2007
- For senators elected on May 10, 2004: June 30, 2004 – June 30, 2010

Senator	Party (Note: Party affiliation as of the 2007 election.)	Term	Term end	Bloc
Edgardo Angara	LDP	1	2007	Minority
Joker Arroyo	Independent	1	2007	Majority
Rodolfo Biazon	Liberal	2	2010	Majority
Pia Cayetano	Lakas	1	2010	Majority
Miriam Defensor Santiago	PRP	1	2010	Majority
Franklin Drilon	Liberal	2	2007	Majority
Loi Ejercito	PMP	1	2007	Minority
Jinggoy Estrada	PMP	1	2010	Minority
Juan Flavier	Lakas	2	2007	Majority
Dick Gordon	Lakas	1	2010	Majority
Panfilo Lacson	Independent	1	2007	Minority
Lito Lapid	Lakas	1	2010	Majority
Alfredo Lim (Note: Alfredo Lim resigned on June 29, 2007, upon taking office as Mayor of Manila.)	PMP	1	2010	Minority
Jamby Madrigal	LDP	1	2010	Minority
Ramon Magsaysay Jr.	Lakas	2	2007	Majority
Serge Osmeña	PDP–Laban	2	2007	Minority
Kiko Pangilinan	Liberal	1	2007	Majority
Nene Pimentel	PDP–Laban	2	2010	Minority
Juan Ponce Enrile	PMP	1	2010	Minority
Ralph Recto	Nacionalista	1	2007	Majority
Bong Revilla	Lakas	1	2010	Majority
Mar Roxas	Liberal	1	2010	Majority
Manny Villar	Nacionalista	1	2007	Majority

=== House of Representatives ===
Final House of Representatives composition.

Thirteenth Congress representation map of the Philippines

Province/City	District	Representative	Party (Note: Party affiliation at election.)	Term	Bloc
Abra	Lone	Luis Bersamin Jr. (Note: Luis Bersamin Jr. was assassinated on December 16, 2006.)	Lakas	2	Majority
Agusan del Norte	1st	Leovigildo Banaag	Lakas	3	Majority
Agusan del Norte	2nd	Angelica Amante	Lakas	1	Majority
Agusan del Sur	Lone	Rodolfo Plaza	NPC	2	Minority
Aklan	Lone	Florencio Miraflores	Lakas	1	Majority
Albay	1st	Edcel Lagman	Aksyon	1	Majority
Albay	2nd	Carlos R. Imperial	Lakas	2	Majority
Albay	3rd	Joey Salceda (Note: Joey Salceda resigned on February 10, 2007, upon being appointed as Presidential Chief of Staff.)	Lakas	3	Majority
Antipolo	1st	Ronaldo Puno (Note: Ronaldo Puno resigned on February 5, 2006, upon being appointed as Secretary of the Interior and Local Government.)	Lakas	1	Majority
Antipolo	2nd	Victor Sumulong	Lakas	3	Majority
Antique	Lone	Exequiel Javier	Lakas	2	Majority
Apayao	Lone	Elias Bulut Jr.	NPC	2	Majority
Aurora	Lone	Sonny Angara	LDP	1	Minority
Bacolod	Lone	Monico Puentevella	Lakas	2	Majority
Baguio	Lone	Mauricio Domogan	Lakas	2	Majority
Basilan	Lone	Abdulgani Salapuddin	Lakas	3	Majority
Bataan	1st	Antonino Roman	Liberal	3	Majority
Bataan	2nd	Albert Garcia	Lakas	1	Majority
Batanes	Lone	Henedina Abad	Liberal	1	Majority
Batangas	1st	Eileen Ermita-Buhain	Lakas	2	Majority
Batangas	2nd	Hermilando Mandanas	Liberal	1	Majority
Batangas	3rd	Victoria Hernandez-Reyes	Lakas	2	Majority
Batangas	4th	Oscar Gozos	Lakas	2	Majority
Benguet	Lone	Samuel Dangwa	Lakas	2	Majority
Biliran	Lone	Gerardo Espina Jr.	NPC	1	Majority
Bohol	1st	Edgar Chatto	Lakas	2	Majority
Bohol	2nd	Roberto Cajes	Lakas	2	Majority
Bohol	3rd	Eladio Jala	Lakas	3	Majority
Bukidnon	1st	Nereus Acosta	Liberal	3	Majority
Bukidnon	2nd	TG Guingona	LDP	1	Minority
Bukidnon	3rd	Migz Zubiri	Lakas	3	Majority
Bulacan	1st	Wilhelmino Sy-Alvarado	Lakas	3	Majority
Bulacan	2nd	Pedro Pancho	PMP	1	Majority
Bulacan	3rd	Lorna Silverio	Lakas	2	Majority
Bulacan	4th	Reylina Nicolas	Lakas	2	Majority
Cagayan	1st	Jack Enrile	NPC	3	Minority
Cagayan	2nd	Florencio Vargas	PMP	1	Majority
Cagayan	3rd	Manuel Mamba	Lakas	2	Majority
Cagayan de Oro	Lone	Constantino Jaraula	Lakas	3	Majority
Caloocan	1st	Oscar Malapitan	LDP	1	Minority
Caloocan	2nd	Luis Asistio	NPC	1	Minority
Camarines Norte	Lone	Renato Unico Jr.	Lakas	2	Majority
Camarines Sur	1st	Rolando Andaya Jr. (Note: Rolando Andaya Jr. resigned on February 5, 2006, upon being appointed as Secretary of Budget and Management.)	Liberal	3	Majority
Camarines Sur	2nd	Luis Villafuerte	Lakas	1	Majority
Camarines Sur	3rd	Arnulfo Fuentebella	NPC	1	Majority
Camarines Sur	4th	Felix Alfelor Jr.	Lakas	2	Majority
Camiguin	Lone	Jurdin Jesus Romualdo	NPC	3	Majority
Capiz	1st	Rodriguez Dadivas	Liberal	2	Majority
Capiz	2nd	Fredenil Castro	Liberal	2	Majority
Catanduanes	Lone	Joseph Santiago	NPC	2	Majority
Cavite	1st	Jun Abaya	Liberal	1	Majority
Cavite	2nd	Gilbert Remulla	LDP	2	Majority
Cavite	3rd	Jesus Crispin Remulla	LDP	1	Majority
Cebu	1st	Eduardo Gullas	Nacionalista	1	Majority
Cebu	2nd	Simeon Kintanar	NPC	3	Majority
Cebu	3rd	Antonio Yapha	NPC	3	Majority
Cebu	4th	Clavel Martinez	Independent	3	Majority
Cebu	5th	Ace Durano (Note: Ace Durano resigned on August 19, 2004, upon being appointed as Secretary of Tourism.)	Lakas	3	Majority
Cebu	5th	Ramon Durano VI (Note: Ramon Durano VI was elected on May 30, 2005, to succeed Ace Durano. He took office on June 9, 2005.)	NPC	0	Majority
Cebu	6th	Nerissa Soon-Ruiz	NPC	2	Majority
Cebu City	1st	Raul del Mar	Lakas	2	Majority
Cebu City	2nd	Antonio Cuenco	Lakas	2	Majority
Compostela Valley	1st	Manuel E. Zamora	Lakas	2	Majority
Compostela Valley	2nd	Prospero Amatong	Lakas	3	Majority
Cotabato	1st	Emmylou Taliño-Mendoza	Independent	2	Majority
Cotabato	2nd	Gregorio Ipong	NPC	3	Majority
Davao City	1st	Prospero Nograles	Lakas	2	Majority
Davao City	2nd	Vincent Garcia	NPC	2	Majority
Davao City	3rd	Ruy Elias Lopez	NPC	3	Minority
Davao del Norte	1st	Arrel Olaño	Lakas	2	Majority
Davao del Norte	2nd	Antonio Floirendo Jr.	Lakas	3	Majority
Davao del Sur	1st	Douglas Cagas	NPC	3	Majority
Davao del Sur	2nd	Claude Bautista	NPC	2	Majority
Davao Oriental	1st	Corazon Malanyaon	NPC	2	Majority
Davao Oriental	2nd	Joel Mayo Almario	Lakas	3	Majority
Eastern Samar	Lone	Marcelino Libanan (Note: Marcelino Libanan resigned on April 18, 2007, upon being appointed as Commissioner of the Bureau of Immigration.)	NPC	3	Majority
Guimaras	Lone	Edgar Espinosa	Lakas	2	Majority
Ifugao	Lone	Solomon Chungalao	Liberal	2	Majority
Ilocos Norte	1st	Roque Ablan Jr.	Lakas	2	Majority
Ilocos Norte	2nd	Imee Marcos	KBL	3	Minority
Ilocos Sur	1st	Salacnib Baterina	Lakas	3	Majority
Ilocos Sur	2nd	Eric Singson	Liberal	2	Majority
Iloilo	1st	Janette Garin	Lakas	1	Majority
Iloilo	2nd	Judy Syjuco	Lakas	1	Majority
Iloilo	3rd	Arthur Defensor Sr.	Lakas	2	Majority
Iloilo	4th	Ferjenel Biron	Kampi	1	Majority
Iloilo	5th	Rolex Suplico	LDP	3	Minority
Iloilo City	Lone	Raul Gonzalez Jr.	Lakas	1	Majority
Isabela	1st	Rodolfo Albano III	NPC	1	Majority
Isabela	2nd	Edwin Uy	Lakas	2	Majority
Isabela	3rd	Bojie Dy	NPC	2	Majority
Isabela	4th	Anthony Miranda	PDP–Laban	1	Majority
Kalinga	Lone	Lawrence Wacnang	Liberal (Note: Also affiliated with Lakas–CMD.)	3	Majority
La Union	1st	Manuel Ortega	NPC	3	Majority
La Union	2nd	Tomas Dumpit	Lakas (Note: Also affiliated with the Nationalist People's Coalition.)	3	Majority
Laguna	1st	Uliran Joaquin	NPC	3	Majority
Laguna	2nd	Timmy Chipeco	LDP	1	Minority
Laguna	3rd	Danton Bueser	Liberal	3	Majority
Laguna	4th	Benjamin Agarao Jr.	LDP	1	Minority
Lanao del Norte	1st	Alipio Cirilo Badelles	NPC	3	Majority
Lanao del Norte	2nd	Abdullah Dimaporo	Lakas	2	Majority
Lanao del Sur	1st	Faysah Dumarpa	Lakas	2	Majority
Lanao del Sur	2nd	Benasing Macarambon Jr.	NPC	3	Majority
Las Piñas	Lone	Cynthia Villar	Nacionalista	2	Majority
Leyte	1st	Remedios Petilla	Lakas	1	Majority
Leyte	2nd	Trinidad Apostol	Lakas	2	Majority
Leyte	3rd	Eduardo Veloso	NPC	3	Majority
Leyte	4th	Eufrocino Codilla Sr.	Lakas	2	Majority
Leyte	5th	Carmen Cari	Lakas	2	Majority
Maguindanao	1st	Bai Sendig Dilangalen	PMP	1	Minority
Maguindanao	2nd	Simeon Datumanong	Lakas	1	Majority
Makati	1st	Teodoro Locsin Jr.	PDP–Laban	2	Majority
Makati	2nd	Butz Aquino	LDP	3	Minority
Malabon-Navotas	Lone	Ricky Sandoval	Liberal	3	Majority
Mandaluyong	Lone	Benjamin Abalos Jr.	Lakas	1	Majority
Manila	1st	Ernesto Nieva	Liberal	3	Majority
Manila	2nd	Jaime Lopez	Lakas	2	Majority
Manila	3rd	Miles Roces	Liberal	1	Majority
Manila	4th	Rodolfo Bacani	Liberal	3	Majority
Manila	5th	Joey Hizon	LDP	3	Majority
Manila	6th	Benny Abante	Lakas	1	Majority
Marikina	Lone	Del de Guzman	Lakas	2	Majority
Marinduque	Lone	Edmundo Reyes Jr.	Lakas	3	Majority
Masbate	1st	Narciso Bravo Jr.	NPC	1	Majority
Masbate	2nd	Emilio Espinosa Jr.	INA	3	Majority
Masbate	3rd	Rizalina Seachon-Lanete	NPC	1	Majority
Misamis Occidental	1st	Ernie Clarete	Reporma	2	Majority
Misamis Occidental	2nd	Herminia Ramiro	Lakas	2	Majority
Misamis Oriental	1st	Danilo Lagbas	KNP (Note: Also affiliated with the Laban ng Demokratikong Pilipino.)	1	Majority
Misamis Oriental	2nd	Augusto Baculio	Lakas	3	Majority
Mountain Province	Lone	Victor Dominguez	Independent	1	Majority
Muntinlupa	Lone	Ruffy Biazon	NPC	2	Majority
Negros Occidental	1st	Tranquilino Carmona	NPC	1	Majority
Negros Occidental	2nd	Alfredo Marañon III	NPC	1	Majority
Negros Occidental	3rd	Jose Carlos Lacson	Lakas	2	Majority
Negros Occidental	4th	Charlie Cojuangco	NPC	3	Majority
Negros Occidental	5th	Iggy Arroyo	Kampi	1	Majority
Negros Occidental	6th	Genaro Rafael Alvarez III	NPC	1	Majority
Negros Oriental	1st	Jacinto Paras	Lakas	3	Minority
Negros Oriental	2nd	Emilio Macias	NPC	3	Majority
Negros Oriental	3rd	Herminio Teves	Lakas	3	Majority
Northern Samar	1st	Harlin Abayon	Liberal	3	Majority
Northern Samar	2nd	Romualdo Vicencio (Note: Romualdo Vicencio died on July 26, 2006.)	Lakas	3	Majority
Nueva Ecija	1st	Josefina Joson	NPC	3	Majority
Nueva Ecija	2nd	Eleuterio Violago	Lakas	2	Majority
Nueva Ecija	3rd	Aurelio Umali	Lakas	2	Majority
Nueva Ecija	4th	Rodolfo Antonino	NPC	1	Majority
Nueva Vizcaya	Lone	Rodolfo Agbayani	LDP	1	Minority
Occidental Mindoro	Lone	Girlie Villarosa	Lakas	1	Majority
Oriental Mindoro	1st	Rodolfo Valencia	Liberal	1	Majority
Oriental Mindoro	2nd	Alfonso Umali Jr.	Liberal	2	Majority
Palawan	1st	Antonio Alvarez	Lakas	1	Majority
Palawan	2nd	Abraham Mitra	Liberal	2	Majority
Pampanga	1st	Francis Nepomuceno	NPC	3	Majority
Pampanga	2nd	Mikey Arroyo	Lakas	1	Majority
Pampanga	3rd	Rey Aquino	Lakas	1	Majority
Pampanga	4th	Anna York Bondoc	NPC	1	Majority
Pangasinan	1st	Arthur Celeste	Lakas	2	Majority
Pangasinan	2nd	Amado Espino Jr.	NPC	2	Majority
Pangasinan	3rd	Generoso Tulagan	NPC	3	Majority
Pangasinan	4th	Jose de Venecia Jr.	Lakas	2	Majority
Pangasinan	5th	Mark Cojuangco	NPC	2	Majority
Pangasinan	6th	Conrado Estrella III	NPC	2	Majority
Parañaque	1st	Eduardo Zialcita	Lakas	2	Majority
Parañaque	2nd	Roilo Golez	Kampi	1	Majority
Pasay	Lone	Consuelo Dy	Lakas	2	Majority
Pasig	Lone	Robert Jaworski Jr.	Lakas	1	Majority
Quezon	1st	Rafael Nantes	Liberal	3	Majority
Quezon	2nd	Proceso Alcala	Liberal	1	Majority
Quezon	3rd	Danilo Suarez	Liberal	1	Majority
Quezon	4th	Erin Tañada	Liberal	1	Majority
Quezon City	1st	Vincent Crisologo	LDP	1	Minority
Quezon City	2nd	Annie Rosa Susano	Lakas	1	Majority
Quezon City	3rd	Matias Defensor Jr.	Liberal	1	Majority
Quezon City	4th	Nanette Castelo-Daza	Lakas	2	Majority
Quirino	Lone	Junie Cua	Liberal	2	Majority
Rizal	1st	Jack Duavit	NPC	2	Majority
Rizal	2nd	Isidro Rodriguez Jr.	NPC	3	Majority
Romblon	Lone	Eduardo Firmalo	LDP	1	Majority
Samar	1st	Reynaldo Uy	Liberal	2	Majority
Samar	2nd	Catalino Figueroa	LDP	1	Majority
San Jose del Monte	Lone	Eduardo Roquero	Lakas	1	Majority
San Juan	Lone	Ronaldo Zamora	Independent	2	Minority
Sarangani	Lone	Erwin Chiongbian	Lakas	2	Majority
Siquijor	Lone	Orlando Fua Jr.	Lakas	3	Majority
Sorsogon	1st	Francis Escudero	NPC	3	Minority
Sorsogon	2nd	Jose Solis	Lakas	2	Majority
South Cotabato	1st	Darlene Antonino Custodio	NPC	2	Minority
South Cotabato	2nd	Arthur Pingoy Jr.	NPC	2	Majority
Southern Leyte	Lone	Roger Mercado	Lakas	1	Majority
Sultan Kudarat	Lone	Suharto Mangudadatu	Lakas	1	Majority
Sulu	1st	Hussin Ututalum Amin	Lakas	3	Majority
Sulu	2nd	Abdulmunir Arbison	Lakas	2	Majority
Surigao del Norte	1st	Glenda Ecleo	Lakas	2	Majority
Surigao del Norte	2nd	Ace Barbers	Lakas	3	Majority
Surigao del Sur	1st	Prospero Pichay Jr.	Lakas	3	Majority
Surigao del Sur	2nd	Peter Paul Jed Falcon	NPC	1	Majority
Taguig–Pateros	Lone	Alan Peter Cayetano	Lakas	3	Minority
Tarlac	1st	Gilbert Teodoro	NPC	3	Majority
Tarlac	2nd	Benigno Aquino III	Liberal	3	Majority
Tarlac	3rd	Jesli Lapus (Note: Jesli Lapus resigned on July 24, 2006, upon being appointed as Secretary of Education.)	NPC	3	Majority
Tawi-Tawi	Lone	Anuar Abubakar (Note: Anuar Abubakar was removed by the House of Representatives Electoral Tribunal on June 30, 2006, after an electoral protest.)	PMP	1	Majority
Tawi-Tawi	Lone	Nur Jaafar (Note: Nur Jaafar took office on August 9, 2006, after winning an electoral protest against Anuar Abubakar.)	Lakas	0	Majority
Valenzuela	1st	Bobbit Carlos	Lakas	1	Majority
Valenzuela	2nd	Antonio Serapio (Note: Antonio Serapio died on February 19, 2007.)	NPC	1	Minority
Zambales	1st	Mitos Magsaysay	Independent	1	Majority
Zambales	2nd	Antonio Diaz	Aksyon	1	Majority
Zamboanga City	Lone	Erbie Fabian	LDP	1	Minority
Zamboanga del Norte	1st	Cecilia Jalosjos-Carreon	PDSP	1	Majority
Zamboanga del Norte	2nd	Roseller Barinaga	NPC	3	Majority
Zamboanga del Norte	3rd	Cesar Jalosjos	PMP	1	Majority
Zamboanga del Sur	1st	Isidoro Real Jr.	Lakas	2	Majority
Zamboanga del Sur	2nd	Antonio Cerilles	NPC	1	Majority
Zamboanga Sibugay	Lone	Belma Cabilao	Lakas	2	Majority
Party-list		Mario Aguja	Akbayan	1	Majority
Party-list		Risa Hontiveros	Akbayan	1	Majority
Party-list		Etta Rosales	Akbayan	1	Majority
Party-list		Rodante Marcoleta	Alagad	1	Majority
Party-list		Acmad Tomawis	ALIF	1	Majority
Party-list		Mujiv Hataman	AMIN	1	Minority
Party-list		Bem Noel	An Waray	1	Minority
Party-list		Crispin Beltran	Anakpawis	1	Majority
Party-list		Rafael V. Mariano	Anakpawis	1	Majority
Party-list		Sunny Rose Madamba	APEC	1	Majority
Party-list		Ernesto Pablo	APEC	1	Majority
Party-list		Edgar Valdez	APEC	1	Majority
Party-list		Eulogio Magsaysay	AVE	1	Majority
Party-list		Teodoro Casiño	Bayan Muna	1	Majority
Party-list		Satur Ocampo	Bayan Muna	1	Majority
Party-list		Joel Virador	Bayan Muna	1	Majority
Party-list		Christian Señeres	Buhay	1	Majority
Party-list		Rene Velarde	Buhay	1	Majority
Party-list		Benjamin Cruz (Note: Benjamin Cruz died on October 15, 2004.)	Butil	1	Majority
Party-list		Leonila Chavez (Note: Leonila Chavez succeeded Benjamin Cruz.)	Butil	0	Majority
Party-list		Joel Villanueva	CIBAC	1	Minority
Party-list		Guillermo Cua	Coop-NATCCO	1	Majority
Party-list		Liza Maza	Gabriela	1	Majority
Party-list		Rene Magtubo	PM	1	Minority
Party-list		Ernesto Gidaya (Note: Ernesto Gidaya died on January 29, 2007.)	VFP	1	Majority
Party-list		Estrella de Leon Santos (Note: Estrella de Leon Santos took office on January 31, 2007, to succeed Ernesto Gidaya.)	VFP	0	Majority

== See also ==
- Congress of the Philippines
- Senate of the Philippines
- House of Representatives of the Philippines
- 2004 Philippine general election
