= Veterans Freedom Party =

Party-list in the Philippines

The Veterans Freedom Party (originally Veterans Federation Party) is a party-list in the Philippines. It is the electoral wing of the Veterans Federation of the Philippines.

In the 2004 elections for the House of Representatives the party-list got 340,759 votes (2.6785% of the nationwide vote) and one seat (Ernesto Gidaya). VFP was one of 5 party-lists said to have received presidential support in connection with the Garci tapes affair.

Gidaya died on December 4, 2006. Two former candidates of the party contested to replace him, Estrella Santos and Rodolfo Gutang. Gutang is the general secretary of the party.

== Electoral performance ==
Election	Votes	%	Seats
1998	304,902	3.33%	1
2001	580,781	3.84%	2
2004	340,759	2.68%	1
2007	196,266	1.23%	1
2010	155,672	0.52%	0
2013	148,372	0.54%	0
