= Democratic Workers of the Philippines =

- — Philippine partylist —
- Full name: Democratic Workers of the Philippines Party-List

Democratic Workers of the Philippines was a party-list that contested the 2004 legislative election in the Philippines. The list obtained 3,900 votes (0.03%) and failed to win any seats. The list obtained its highest share of votes in the Central Visayas region, where it won 1,119 votes (0.14%).

== Electoral performance ==
Election	Votes	%	Seats
2004	3,900	0.03%	0
