= Suara Bangsamoro =

- Founded: March 18, 2002
- Ideology: Moro self-determinism Anti-imperialism
- Political position: Left-wing
- National affiliation: Bayan Muna; Makabayan
- Colors: Green
- Seats in the House of Representatives of the Philippines: 0 / 316
- House of Representatives party-list seats: 0 / 63

Suara Bangsamoro (transl. Voice of Moro People) is a political organization and Moro advocacy group which made a bid for party-list representation in the House of Representatives of the Philippines.

== History ==
Suara Bangsamoro was established on March 18, 2002 as a political representation of the leftist organization Bayan Muna specifically catering to the interest of the Moro people of Mindanao. It participated in the 2004 Philippine House of Representatives elections as an aspirant party-list group with Amirah Ali Lidasan, Suara Bangsamoro's secretary-general who was also a former chairman of the National Union of Students of the Philippines (NUSP) as its first nominee. However the organization failed to win a single seat alleging that it has been a victim of voter fraud in Mindanao. It also made a second failed bid in the 2007 elections.

== Political position ==
Suara Bangsamoro's advocacies is centered on the self-determinism and self-reliance of the Moro people, as well as fostering inter-ethnic relations between Moros and non-Moro Filipinos in the context of the Mindanao peace process. It also seeks what it believes is genuine industrialization and land reform. It is also against actions by foreign parties which it equates to "foreign aggression, domination, exploitation, and oppression", and is particularly critical of the role of the United States in the Moro conflict.

== Electoral performance ==
Election	Votes	%	Seats
2004	164,494	1.29%	0
2007	114,024	0.71%	0
