= Alliance of Volunteer Educators =

Alliance of Volunteer Educators is a NGO and party-list in the Philippines.

In the 2004 elections for the House of Representatives the party-list got 343,498 votes (2.7% of the nationwide party-list vote) and one seat (Eulogio Magsaysay).

== Electoral performance ==
Election	Votes	%	Seats
2004	343,498	2.70%	1
2007	110,769	0.69%	0
2010	214,750	0.71%	1
2013	270,159	0.99%	1
2016	157,792	0.49%	0
2019	25,025	0.09%	0
