= 2001 Philippine Senate election =

27th election of members to the Senate of the Philippines

- May 14, 2001

12 (of the 24) seats to the Senate of the Philippines and one mid-term vacancy 13 seats needed for a majority
Alliance	PPC	PnM	Independent
Seats won	8	4	1
Popular vote	123,491,617	95,072,114	22,303,310
Percentage	50.81	39.12	9.18
Senate President before election
Aquilino Pimentel Jr.
PDP–Laban
Elected Senate President
Franklin Drilon
Independent

The 27th election of members to the Senate of the Philippines was held on Monday, May 14, 2001, to elect 12 of the 24 seats and one mid-term vacancy in the Senate. Independent candidate Noli de Castro, a journalist and former television anchor, was announced as the topnotcher. This became the first synchronized national and local elections held after the ouster of former President Joseph Estrada in January due to a military-backed civilian uprising, popularly known as EDSA II.

The PPC won eight seats, the Puwersa ng Masa won four, and Noli de Castro as an independent won one; PPC's Ralph Recto edged out Puwersa ng Masa's Gregorio Honasan for the twelfth place and Honasan was elected to serve the remainder of Guingona's term. On February 20, 2007, the Supreme Court of the Philippines ruled that Honasan did lose the election but declared the special election constitutional for the remaining three-year term of Teofisto Guingona Jr.

== Electoral system ==
Philippine Senate elections are via pluraity block voting, with the entire country as an at-large "district". Each voter has 12 votes, and can vote for up to 12 candidates. Seats up were the seats last contested in 1995.

With the appointment of Teofisto Guingona Jr. as vice president in 2001, the COMELEC ruled that the thirteenth placed candidate shall serve for Guingona's unexpired term.

== Candidates ==
The two competing coalitions in this election were the anti-Estrada People Power Coalition (PPC) and the pro-Estrada Puwersa ng Masa coalition.

The PPC was composed of Lakas—National Union of Christian Democrats—United Muslim Democrats of the Philippines, Partido para sa Demokratikong Reporma—Lapiang Manggagawa, Aksyon Demokratiko, Probinsya Muna Development Initiative, Liberal Party and Partido Demokratiko Pilipino—Lakas ng Bayan.

The Puwersa ng Masa included Laban ng Demokratikong Pilipino and Partido ng Masang Pilipino along with pro-Estrada independent candidates.

The Kilusang Bagong Lipunan put up a 4-candidate slate, while three parties had one candidate each. There were also 4 independents not associated with the PPC, Puwersa ng Masa, or other parties.

With the mid-term vacancy due to Guingona's appointment, both slates now had 13 candidates instead of the usual 12.

=== Administration coalition ===
People Power Coalition ticket
Name	Party
Joker Arroyo	Lakas
Liwayway Vinzons-Chato	Independent
Franklin Drilon	Independent
Juan Flavier	Lakas
Ernesto Herrera	Lakas
Ramon Magsaysay Jr.	Independent
Winnie Monsod	Aksyon
Serge Osmeña	PDP–Laban
Roberto Pagdanganan	Lakas
Kiko Pangilinan	Liberal
Ralph Recto	Lakas
Wigberto Tañada	Liberal
Manny Villar	Independent

=== Opposition coalition ===
Puwersa ng Masa ticket
Name	Party
Edgardo Angara	LDP
Reuben Canoy	LDP
Noli de Castro	Independent
Miriam Defensor Santiago	PRP
Juan Ponce Enrile	LDP
Loi Ejercito	Independent
Gregorio Honasan	Independent
Panfilo Lacson	LDP
Jamby Madrigal	LDP
Orly Mercado	Independent
Dong Puno	LDP
Santanina Rasul	Independent
Ombra Tamano	LDP

=== Others ===
Kilusang Bagong Lipunan ticket
Name	Party
Juan Casil	KBL
Melchor Chavez	KBL
Oliver Lozano	KBL
Norma Nueva	KBL

Non-independents not in tickets
Name	Party
Homobono Adaza	Nacionalista
Moner Bajunaid	PDSP
Eddie Gil	PIBID

Independents not in tickets
Name	Party
Manuel Morato	Independent
Rod Navarro	Independent
Camilo Sabio	Independent
Perfecto Yasay	Independent

Note: Party affiliation based on Certificate of Candidacy.

== Retiring and term limited incumbents ==
1. Nikki Coseteng (NPC), term limited; ran for senator in 2007 and lost
2. Francisco Tatad (PRP), term limited; ran for senator in 2004 and in 2010 and lost both times

=== Mid-term vacancies ===
1. Gloria Macapagal Arroyo (Lakas), ran for Vice President of the Philippines and won in 1998
  - Arroyo subsequently became president on January 20, 2001, after the Second EDSA Revolution which resulted in the overthrow of Joseph Estrada.
2. Marcelo Fernan (LDP), died on July 11, 1999
3. Teofisto Guingona Jr. (Lakas), appointed Vice President of the Philippines on February 7, 2001
4. Raul Roco (Aksyon), appointed Secretary of Education, Culture and Sports on February 10, 2001

== Results ==
The People Power Coalition (PPC) won eight seats, the Puwersa ng Masa won four, and an independent candidate won one. Of the four seats Puwersa ng Masa won, one was for the seat of Vice President Teofisto Guingona Jr., whose senatorial term would have ended on June 30, 2004.

Four incumbent senators won: Franklin Drilon, Juan Flavier, Ramon Magsaysay Jr. and Serge Osmeña of PPC. Puwersa ng Masa's Gregorio Honasan finished 13th and served the Guingona's unexpired term.

There are seven neophyte senators: PPC's Joker Arroyo, Francis Pangilinan, Ralph Recto, Manny Villar, Puwersa ng Masa's Loi Ejercito and Panfilo Lacson, independent candidate Noli de Castro.

Returning is Edgardo Angara, who was term limited in the previous election.

Puwersa ng Masa senators Miriam Defensor Santiago and Juan Ponce Enrile did not successfully defend their seats.

	1	2	3	4	5	6	7	8	9	10	11	12	13	14	15	16	17	18	19	20	21	22	23	24
Before election							‡	‡	‡	‡	‡	‡	‡^	‡^	‡^	‡^	‡	‡	‡					
Election result	Not up						Puwersa ng Masa				People Power Coalition								Ind	Not up				
After election							*	+	√	+	+	√	√	*	+	+	√	+	+					
Senate bloc	Minority bloc											Majority bloc												

Key:

- ‡ Seats up
- + Gained by a party from another party
- √ Held by the incumbent
- * Held by the same party with a new senator
- ^ Vacancy

=== Per candidate ===
Candidate	Party or alliance		Votes	%
Noli de Castro	Independent (Note: Guest candidate of Puwersa ng Masa)		16,237,386	55.09
Juan Flavier	People Power Coalition	Lakas–NUCD–UMDP	11,735,897	39.82
Serge Osmeña	People Power Coalition	PDP–Laban	11,593,389	39.33
Franklin Drilon	People Power Coalition	Independent	11,301,700	38.34
Joker Arroyo	People Power Coalition	Lakas–NUCD–UMDP	11,262,402	38.21
Ramon Magsaysay Jr.	People Power Coalition	Independent	11,250,677	38.17
Manny Villar	People Power Coalition	Independent	11,187,375	37.96
Kiko Pangilinan	People Power Coalition	Liberal Party	10,971,896	37.23
Edgardo Angara	Puwersa ng Masa	Laban ng Demokratikong Pilipino	10,805,177	36.66
Panfilo Lacson	Puwersa ng Masa	Laban ng Demokratikong Pilipino	10,535,559	35.74
Loi Ejercito	Puwersa ng Masa	Independent	10,524,130	35.71
Ralph Recto (Note: 18,000 votes deducted in Zamboanga del Norte as per Resolution No. NBC 01-003)	People Power Coalition	Lakas–NUCD–UMDP	10,480,940	35.56
Gregorio Honasan (Note: Elected to serve the unexpired term (until 2004) of Teofisto Guingona Jr., who was appointed Vice President in February 2001.)	Puwersa ng Masa	Independent	10,454,527	35.47
Juan Ponce Enrile	Puwersa ng Masa	Laban ng Demokratikong Pilipino	9,677,209	32.83
Miriam Defensor Santiago	Puwersa ng Masa	People's Reform Party	9,622,742	32.65
Dong Puno	Puwersa ng Masa	Laban ng Demokratikong Pilipino	8,701,205	29.52
Wigberto Tañada	People Power Coalition	Liberal Party	8,159,836	27.68
Orly Mercado	Puwersa ng Masa	Independent	7,395,092	25.09
Roberto Pagdanganan	People Power Coalition	Lakas–NUCD–UMDP	7,185,415	24.38
Ernesto Herrera	People Power Coalition	Lakas–NUCD–UMDP	6,801,861	23.08
Winnie Monsod	People Power Coalition	Aksyon Demokratiko	6,728,728	22.83
Santanina Rasul	Puwersa ng Masa	Independent	5,222,490	17.72
Jamby Madrigal	Puwersa ng Masa	Laban ng Demokratikong Pilipino	5,043,043	17.11
Liwayway Vinzons-Chato	People Power Coalition	Independent	4,831,501	16.39
Perfecto Yasay	Independent		4,557,364	15.46
Ombra Tamano	Puwersa ng Masa	Laban ng Demokratikong Pilipino	3,548,480	12.04
Reuben Canoy	Puwersa ng Masa	Laban ng Demokratikong Pilipino	3,542,460	12.02
Homobono Adaza	Nacionalista Party		770,647	2.61
Rod Navarro	Independent		652,012	2.21
Manuel Morato	Independent		625,789	2.12
Moner Bajunaid	Partido Demokratiko Sosyalista ng Pilipinas		503,437	1.71
Oliver Lozano	Kilusang Bagong Lipunan		470,572	1.60
Melchor Chavez	Kilusang Bagong Lipunan		244,553	0.83
Camilo Sabio	Independent		230,759	0.78
Norma Nueva	Kilusang Bagong Lipunan		83,700	0.28
Juan Casil	Kilusang Bagong Lipunan		74,481	0.25
Eddie Gil	Partido Isang Bansa, Isang Diwa		15,522	0.05
Total			243,029,953	100.00
Total votes			29,474,309	–
Registered voters/turnout			36,271,782	81.26
Source: COMELEC vote totals, NCSB (turnout)

=== Per coalition ===
Party or alliance		Votes	%	Seats
People Power Coalition	Lakas–NUCD–UMDP	47,466,515	19.53	3
People Power Coalition	Liberal Party	19,131,732	7.87	1
People Power Coalition	PDP–Laban	11,593,389	4.77	1
People Power Coalition	Aksyon Demokratiko	6,728,728	2.77	0
People Power Coalition	Independent	38,571,253	15.87	3
People Power Coalition	Total	123,491,617	50.81	8
Puwersa ng Masa	Laban ng Demokratikong Pilipino	51,853,133	21.34	2
Puwersa ng Masa	People's Reform Party	9,622,742	3.96	0
Puwersa ng Masa	Independent (Note: Includes one candidate elected for a three-year term.)	33,596,239	13.82	2
Puwersa ng Masa	Total	95,072,114	39.12	4
Kilusang Bagong Lipunan		873,306	0.36	0
Nacionalista Party		770,647	0.32	0
Partido Demokratiko Sosyalista ng Pilipinas		503,437	0.21	0
Partido Isang Bansa, Isang Diwa		15,522	0.01	0
Independent		22,303,310	9.18	1
Total		243,029,953	100.00	13
Total votes		29,474,309	–	
Registered voters/turnout		36,271,782	81.26	
Source: "Electoral Politics in the Philippines" (PDF). quezon.ph.

Vote share
PPC	50.81%
PnM	39.12%
Others	10.07%

Senate seats
PPC	61.53%
PnM	30.76%
Others	7.69%

=== Per party ===
Party	Votes	%	+/–	Seats				
Party	Votes	%	+/–	Up	Before	Won	After	+/−
Laban ng Demokratikong Pilipino	51,853,133	21.34	−5.97	1	5	2	6	+1
Lakas–NUCD–UMDP	47,466,515	19.53	−25.91	1	5	3	7	+2
Liberal Party	19,131,732	7.87	+5.22	0	0	1	1	New
PDP–Laban	11,593,389	4.77	−0.21	1	2	1	2	0
People's Reform Party	9,622,742	3.96	New	1	1	0	0	−1
Aksyon Demokratiko	6,728,728	2.77	New	0	0	0	0	0
Kilusang Bagong Lipunan	873,306	0.36	New	0	0	0	0	0
Nacionalista Party	770,647	0.32	New	0	0	0	0	0
Partido Demokratiko Sosyalista ng Pilipinas	503,437	0.21	New	0	0	0	0	0
Partido Isang Bansa, Isang Diwa	15,522	0.01	New	0	0	0	0	0
Independent	94,470,802	38.87	+35.33	3	3	6	6	+3
Grand Alliance for Democracy/Gabaybayan				1	1	0	0	−1
Nationalist People's Coalition				1	2	0	1	−1
Partido ng Masang Pilipino				0	1	0	1	0
Vacancy				4	4	0	0	−4
Total	243,029,953	100.00	–	13	24	13	24	0
Total votes	29,474,309	–						
Registered voters/turnout	36,271,782	81.26						
Source: "Electoral Politics in the Philippines" (PDF). quezon.ph.

Vote share
LDP	21.34%
Lakas	19.53%
LP	7.87%
PDP-Laban	4.77%
Independent	38.87%
Others	7.62%

Senate seats won
LDP	15.38%
Lakas	23.08%
LP	7.69%
PDP-Laban	7.69%
Independent	46.15%
Others	0.00%

== Defeated incumbents ==
1. Miriam Defensor Santiago (PRP/Puwersa ng Masa), ran in 2004 and won
2. Juan Ponce Enrile (LDP/Puwersa ng Masa), ran in 2004 and won

== See also ==
- Commission on Elections
- Politics of the Philippines
- Philippine elections
- Philippine midterm election
- 12th Congress of the Philippines
