= List of senators of the Philippines in the 10th Congress by seniority =

This is a complete list of senators of the Philippines during the 10th Congress of the Philippines listed by seniority from June 30, 1995, to June 30, 1998.

The criteria for seniority used in this article are derived from the cumulative length of service of a member of the Senate prior to the current Congress. Although an official roster ranking senators by seniority is not publicly available, their total cumulative years of service have been used to determine seniority. It has long been customary, following the practice of the United States Senate, to elect the most senior senator as either president of the Senate or president pro tempore, although this practice has become less common in the modern Senate. Furthermore, seniority is traditionally considered in the selection of chairpersons of major Senate committees.

In cases where senators have equal cumulative service, seniority is determined by the following criteria, in order:

- Longest uninterrupted period of service
- Earlier date on which the cumulative length of service was achieved
- Alphabetical order of surnames

In this Congress, Ernesto Maceda was the most senior senator, having previously served eight years in Senate, while Serge Osmeña was the most junior senator.

== List of senators by seniority ==
Rank	Senator	Party		Length of previous tenures (Dates of previous tenures)	Notes
Rank	Senator	Start of Congress	End of Congress	Length of previous tenures (Dates of previous tenures)	Notes
1	Ernesto Maceda	NPC		8 years, 268 days (December 30, 1971 – September 23, 1972; June 30, 1987 – June 30, 1995)	Senate president (October 10, 1996 – January 26, 1998)
2	Heherson Alvarez	LDP	Lakas	8 years, 0 days (June 30, 1987 – June 30, 1995)	
3	Edgardo Angara	LDP		8 years, 0 days (June 30, 1987 – June 30, 1995)	Senate president (until August 28, 1995)
4	Neptali Gonzales	LDP		8 years, 0 days (June 30, 1987 – June 30, 1995)	Senate president (August 29, 1995 – October 10, 1996; from January 26, 1998)
5	Ernesto Herrera	LDP	LAMMP	8 years, 0 days (June 30, 1987 – June 30, 1995)	
6	Orly Mercado	LDP		8 years, 0 days (June 30, 1987 – June 30, 1995)	
7	Leticia Ramos-Shahani	Lakas		8 years, 0 days (June 30, 1987 – June 30, 1995)	Senate president pro tempore (until October 10, 1996)
8	Alberto Romulo	LDP		8 years, 0 days (June 30, 1987 – June 30, 1995)	
9	Juan Ponce Enrile	Independent		4 years, 320 days (August 15, 1987 – June 30, 1992)	
10	Nikki Coseteng	NPC		3 years, 0 days (June 30, 1992 – June 30, 1995)	
11	Gloria Macapagal Arroyo	LDP	Lakas	3 years, 0 days (June 30, 1992 – June 30, 1995)	Resigned on June 30, 1998, upon taking office as Vice President of the Philippines.
12	Blas Ople	LDP		3 years, 0 days (June 30, 1992 – June 30, 1995)	Senate president pro tempore (from October 10, 1996)
13	Ramon Revilla Sr.	LDP	Lakas	3 years, 0 days (June 30, 1992 – June 30, 1995)	
14	Raul Roco	LDP	Aksyon	3 years, 0 days (June 30, 1992 – June 30, 1995)	
15	Tito Sotto	LDP		3 years, 0 days (June 30, 1992 – June 30, 1995)	
16	Francisco Tatad	LDP	Gabay Bayan	3 years, 0 days (June 30, 1992 – June 30, 1995)	
17	Freddie Webb	LDP		3 years, 0 days (June 30, 1992 – June 30, 1995)	
18	Miriam Defensor Santiago	PRP			
19	Franklin Drilon	Lakas	LAMMP		
20	Marcelo Fernan	LDP			
21	Juan Flavier	Lakas			
22	Gregorio Honasan	Independent			
23	Ramon Magsaysay Jr.	Lakas	LAMMP		
24	Serge Osmeña	Lakas	Independent		
