= 2001 Philippine general election =

- May 14, 2001
- Registered: 36,271,782
- Turnout: 29,474,309
- Senate election
- May 14, 2001

12 (of the 24) seats to the Senate of the Philippines and one mid-term vacancy 13 seats needed for a majority
Alliance	PPC	PnM
Seats won	8	4
Popular vote	123,491,617	95,072,114
Percentage	50.81	39.12
Senate President before election
Aquilino Pimentel Jr.
PDP–Laban
Elected Senate President
Franklin Drilon
Independent
- House of Representatives elections
- May 14, 2001
- All 261 seats in the House of Representatives (including underhangs); 130 seats needed for a majority
Party	Seats	+/–
Lakas	79	−32
NPC	42	+33
LDP	21	+21
Liberal	19	+4
Others	48	+33
Party-list	16	+2
This lists parties that won seats. See the complete results below.
Speaker before	Speaker after
Feliciano Belmonte Jr. Lakas	Jose de Venecia Jr. Lakas

Legislative elections and local elections were held in the Philippines on May 14, 2001, independent candidate Noli de Castro, a former television anchor of TV Patrol of ABS-CBN was announced as the topnotcher in the Senate race. This was the first synchronized national and local elections held after the ouster of former president Joseph Estrada in January due to a military-backed civilian uprising (popularly known as EDSA II) with pro-Estrada counter-protests that followed right before Election Day. On February 20, 2007, the Supreme Court of the Philippines ruled that former senator Gregorio Honasan lost in the 2001 Philippine elections and lost to Sen. Ralph Recto but declared constitutional the special election for the remaining three-year term of Teofisto Guingona.

== Candidates ==
=== Administration coalition ===
People Power Coalition
Joker Arroyo	Aksyon
Liwayway Vinzons-Chato	Reporma
Franklin Drilon	Independent
Juan Flavier	Lakas
Ernesto Herrera	Lakas
Ramon Magsaysay Jr.	Lakas
Winnie Monsod	Aksyon
Serge Osmeña	PDP–Laban
Roberto Pagdanganan	Aksyon
Kiko Pangilinan	Liberal
Ralph Recto	Lakas
Wigberto Tañada	Liberal
Manuel Villar	Independent

=== Opposition coalition ===
Puwersa ng Masa
Edgardo Angara	LDP
Reuben Canoy	LDP
Noli de Castro	Independent
Miriam Defensor Santiago	PRP
Juan Ponce Enrile	Independent
Loi Ejercito	Independent
Gregorio Honasan	Independent
Panfilo Lacson	LDP
Jamby Madrigal	LDP
Orly Mercado	Independent
Ricardo Puno	LDP
Santanina Rasul	Independent
Ombra Tamano	LDP

=== Other notable candidates ===
Kilusang Bagong Lipunan
Oliver Lozano	KBL
Melchor Chavez	KBL

Partido Isang Bansa, Isang Diwa
Eddie Gil	PIBID

Nacionalista Party
Homobono Adaza	Nacionalista

Independent
Perfecto Yasay	Independent

== Results ==
=== Senate ===
Representation of results; seats contested are inside the box. Lakas-NUCD-UMDP LDP PDP–Laban Liberal Party NPC PMP Independent

Final COMELEC Tally for Senators as of August 30, 2001.

Candidate	Party or alliance		Votes	%
Noli de Castro	Independent (Note: Guest candidate of Puwersa ng Masa)		16,237,386	55.09
Juan Flavier	People Power Coalition	Lakas–NUCD–UMDP	11,735,897	39.82
Serge Osmeña	People Power Coalition	PDP–Laban	11,593,389	39.33
Franklin Drilon	People Power Coalition	Independent	11,301,700	38.34
Joker Arroyo	People Power Coalition	Lakas–NUCD–UMDP	11,262,402	38.21
Ramon Magsaysay Jr.	People Power Coalition	Independent	11,250,677	38.17
Manny Villar	People Power Coalition	Independent	11,187,375	37.96
Kiko Pangilinan	People Power Coalition	Liberal Party	10,971,896	37.23
Edgardo Angara	Puwersa ng Masa	Laban ng Demokratikong Pilipino	10,805,177	36.66
Panfilo Lacson	Puwersa ng Masa	Laban ng Demokratikong Pilipino	10,535,559	35.74
Loi Ejercito	Puwersa ng Masa	Independent	10,524,130	35.71
Ralph Recto (Note: 18,000 votes deducted in Zamboanga del Norte as per Resolution No. NBC 01-003)	People Power Coalition	Lakas–NUCD–UMDP	10,480,940	35.56
Gregorio Honasan (Note: Elected to serve the unexpired term (until 2004) of Teofisto Guingona Jr., who was appointed Vice President in February 2001.)	Puwersa ng Masa	Independent	10,454,527	35.47
Juan Ponce Enrile	Puwersa ng Masa	Laban ng Demokratikong Pilipino	9,677,209	32.83
Miriam Defensor Santiago	Puwersa ng Masa	People's Reform Party	9,622,742	32.65
Dong Puno	Puwersa ng Masa	Laban ng Demokratikong Pilipino	8,701,205	29.52
Wigberto Tañada	People Power Coalition	Liberal Party	8,159,836	27.68
Orly Mercado	Puwersa ng Masa	Independent	7,395,092	25.09
Roberto Pagdanganan	People Power Coalition	Lakas–NUCD–UMDP	7,185,415	24.38
Ernesto Herrera	People Power Coalition	Lakas–NUCD–UMDP	6,801,861	23.08
Winnie Monsod	People Power Coalition	Aksyon Demokratiko	6,728,728	22.83
Santanina Rasul	Puwersa ng Masa	Independent	5,222,490	17.72
Jamby Madrigal	Puwersa ng Masa	Laban ng Demokratikong Pilipino	5,043,043	17.11
Liwayway Vinzons-Chato	People Power Coalition	Independent	4,831,501	16.39
Perfecto Yasay	Independent		4,557,364	15.46
Ombra Tamano	Puwersa ng Masa	Laban ng Demokratikong Pilipino	3,548,480	12.04
Reuben Canoy	Puwersa ng Masa	Laban ng Demokratikong Pilipino	3,542,460	12.02
Homobono Adaza	Nacionalista Party		770,647	2.61
Rod Navarro	Independent		652,012	2.21
Manuel Morato	Independent		625,789	2.12
Moner Bajunaid	Partido Demokratiko Sosyalista ng Pilipinas		503,437	1.71
Oliver Lozano	Kilusang Bagong Lipunan		470,572	1.60
Melchor Chavez	Kilusang Bagong Lipunan		244,553	0.83
Camilo Sabio	Independent		230,759	0.78
Norma Nueva	Kilusang Bagong Lipunan		83,700	0.28
Juan Casil	Kilusang Bagong Lipunan		74,481	0.25
Eddie Gil	Partido Isang Bansa, Isang Diwa		15,522	0.05
Total			243,029,953	100.00
Total votes			29,474,309	–
Registered voters/turnout			36,271,782	81.26
Source: COMELEC vote totals, NCSB (turnout)

=== House of Representatives ===
==== Elections at congressional districts ====
Party	Seats	+/–
Lakas–NUCD–UMDP	79	−32
Nationalist People's Coalition	42	+33
Laban ng Demokratikong Pilipino	21	+21
Liberal Party	19	+4
Alayon Alang sa Kalambu-an ng Kalinaw	4	New
Partido ng Masang Pilipino	4	+4
Nationalist People's Coalition–INA	3	New
United Negros Alliance	3	New
PROMDI	3	−1
Aksyon Demokratiko	2	+1
Partido Magdalo	2	New
PDP–Laban	2	+2
Partido para sa Demokratikong Reporma–Lapiang Manggagawa	2	−2
Barug Alang sa Kauswagan ug Demokrasya–Alayon Alang sa Kalambu-an ng Kalinaw	1	New
Kabayani	1	New
Kabalikat ng Malayang Pilipino	1	+1
Kilusang Bagong Lipunan	1	+1
Laban ng Demokratikong Pilipino–Nationalist People's Coalition	1	New
Liping Kalookan	1	New
Nationalist People's Coalition–Achievers with Integrity Movement	1	New
Nationalist People's Coalition–United Negros Alliance	1	New
Partido Demokratiko Sosyalista ng Pilipinas	1	+1
People Power Coalition	1	New
Not indicated and undeclared	5	+1
Independent	8	+6
Party-list seats (Note: Only 16 were seated in the party-list election.)	52	+1
Total	261	+3
Source: COMELEC (via Wayback Machine NCR, Luzon, Visayas, Mindanao)

==== Party-list election ====
Party	Votes	%	Seats
Bayan Muna	1,708,253	26.19	3
Association of Philippine Electric Cooperatives	802,060	12.30	3
Akbayan	377,852	5.79	2
Luzon Farmers Party	330,282	5.06	1
Citizens' Battle Against Corruption	323,810	4.96	1
Buhay Hayaan Yumabong	290,760	4.46	1
Anak Mindanao	252,051	3.86	1
Alyansang Bayanihan ng mga Magsasaka, Manggagawang Bukid at Mangingisda	242,199	3.71	1
Philippine Coconut Producers Federation	229,165	3.51	1
Partido ng Manggagawa	216,823	3.32	1
Sanlakas	151,017	2.32	1
Abanse! Pinay	135,211	2.07	1
Adhikain at Kilusan ng Ordinaryong Tao para sa Lupa, Pabahay, Hanapbuhay at Kaunlaran	126,012	1.93	0
Alagad	117,161	1.80	0
Senior Citizens/Elderly Sectoral Party	106,496	1.63	0
All Trade Union Congress of the Philippines	103,273	1.58	0
Maritime Party	98,946	1.52	0
Ang Bagong Bayani-OFW Labor Party	97,085	1.49	0
Aniban ng mga Magsasaka, Mangingisda at Manggagawa sa Agrikultura Katipunan	65,735	1.01	0
Alyansa ng Nagkakaisang Kabataan ng Sambayanan Para sa Kaunlaran	63,312	0.97	0
Alyansa ng may Kapansanan sa Pilipinas	54,925	0.84	0
Mindanao Federation of Small Coconut Farmers Organization	49,914	0.77	0
Womenpower	46,831	0.72	0
Aggrupation and Alliance Farmers and Fisherfolks of the Phils.	43,882	0.67	0
All Workers Alliance Trade Unions	42,149	0.65	0
National Confederation of Tricycle Operators and Driver's Association of the Phils.	38,898	0.60	0
National Federation of Small Coconut Farmers Organization	37,470	0.57	0
Tribal Communities Association of the Philippines	35,807	0.55	0
Pilipinong May Kapansanan	32,151	0.49	0
Veterans Care and Welfare Organization	31,694	0.49	0
Union of the Filipino Overseas Workers	29,400	0.45	0
Pilipino Workers Party	24,182	0.37	0
Democratic Alliance	24,029	0.37	0
Philippine Association of Retired Persons	23,297	0.36	0
Alliance of Retired Postal Employees and Senior Citizens	22,497	0.34	0
Agrarian Reform Beneficiaries Association	22,345	0.34	0
Federation of Jeepney Operators and Drivers Association of the Phils.	21,335	0.33	0
Gabay ng Manggagawang Pilipino Party	17,777	0.27	0
Alternative Approaches of Settlers Advocacy for the Holistic Advancement of the Nation Party	16,787	0.26	0
Alliance for Youth Solidarity	15,871	0.24	0
Party for Overseas Workers and Empowerment and Re-Integration	13,050	0.20	0
Kilos Kabataang Pilipino	11,170	0.17	0
Kaloob-Ka Isang Loob para sa Marangal na Paninirahan	9,137	0.14	0
Alyansa ng Mga Mamamayan at Magdaragat Sa Lawa ng Laguna	7,882	0.12	0
Partido Katutubong Pilipino	6,602	0.10	0
Development Foundation of the Philippines	6,600	0.10	0
Total	6,523,185	100.00	17
Valid votes	6,523,185	22.13	
Invalid/blank votes	22,951,124	77.87	
Total votes	29,474,309	100.00	
Registered voters/turnout	36,271,782	81.26	
Source: Supreme Court (G.R. No. 147589); COMELEC (Canvass report (archived))

=== Local elections ===
Local elections for all positions above the barangay level, but below the regional level, were held on this day.

The newly created province of Zamboanga Sibugay held its first local elections on this day as well.

==== Gubernatorial elections ====
The following are the results of the gubernatorial elections by party:

Party	Seats
Lakas–NUCD–UMDP	28
Nationalist People's Coalition	17
Laban ng Demokratikong Pilipino	10
Partido ng Masang Pilipino	5
Liberal Party	4
Partido para sa Demokratikong Reporma	4
Kabalikat ng Mamamayang Pilipino	2
Kilusang Bagong Lipunan	1
Partido Demokratiko Sosyalista ng Pilipinas	1
Partido Isang Bansa, Isang Diwa	1
Partido Magdalo	1
PROMDI	1
Independents	3
No data	1
Total	79
Source: Commission on Elections

The following are the results of the gubernatorial elections by province:

Province	Elected governor	Party
Abra	Vicente Valera	PDSP
Agusan del Norte	Angelica Amante	Lakas
Agusan del Sur	Adolph Edward Plaza	LDP
Aklan	Florencio Miraflores	LDP
Albay	Al Francis Bichara	Lakas
Antique	Salvacion Z. Perez	LDP
Apayao	Elias Bulut Sr.	NPC
Aurora	Ramoncita Ong	Lakas
Basilan	Wahab Akbar	PMP
Bataan	Leonardo Roman	NPC
Batanes	Vicente Gato	Liberal
Batangas	Hermilando Mandanas	Reporma
Benguet	Raul Molintas	NPC
Biliran	Rogelio Espina	LDP
Bohol	Erico Aumentado	Lakas
Bukidnon	Jose Maria Zubiri Jr.	Lakas
Bulacan	Josefina dela Cruz	Lakas
Cagayan	Edgar Lara	NPC
Camarines Norte	Jesus Typoco Jr.	Lakas
Camarines Sur	Luis Villafuerte	LDP
Camiguin	Pedro Romualdo	Lakas
Capiz	Vicente Bermejo	Liberal
Catanduanes	Leandro Verceles Jr.	Lakas
Cavite	Ayong Maliksi	Magdalo
Cebu	Pablo P. Garcia	PROMDI
Compostela Valley	Jose Caballero	Reporma
Cotabato	Emmanuel Piñol	PIBID
Davao del Norte	Rodolfo del Rosario	Lakas
Davao del Sur	Reynerio Llanos	NPC
Davao Oriental	Maria Elena Palma Gil	Lakas
Eastern Samar	Clotilde Salazar	NPC
Guimaras	JC Rahman Nava	LDP
Ifugao	Teddy Baguilat	Independent
Ilocos Norte	Bongbong Marcos	KBL
Ilocos Sur	Deogracias Victor Savellano	Lakas
Iloilo	Niel Tupas	LDP
Isabela	Faustino Dy Jr.	NPC
Kalinga	Macario Duguiang	NPC
La Union	Victor Ortega	Lakas
Laguna	Teresita Lazaro	PMP
Lanao del Norte	Imelda Dimaporo	Lakas
Lanao del Sur	Mamintal Adiong Sr.	PMP
Leyte	Remedios Petilla	Lakas
Maguindanao	Andal Ampatuan Sr.	PMP
Marinduque	Carmencita Reyes	Independent
Masbate	Antonio Kho	Reporma
Misamis Occidental	Loreto Leo Ocampos	Lakas
Misamis Oriental	Antonio Calingin	LDP
Mountain Province	Sario Malinias	NPC
Negros Occidental	Joseph Marañon	Independent
Negros Oriental	George Arnaiz	NPC
Northern Samar	Raul Daza	Liberal
Nueva Ecija	Tomas Joson III	NPC
Nueva Vizcaya	Rodolfo Agbayani	NPC
Occidental Mindoro	Jose Villarosa	Lakas
Oriental Mindoro	Bartolome Marasigan	Lakas
Palawan	Mario Joel Reyes	Lakas
Pampanga	Lito Lapid	Lakas
Pangasinan	Victor Agbayani	Lakas
Quezon	Wilfrido Enverga	Reporma
Quirino	Pedro Bacani	LDP
Rizal	Rebecca Ynares	NPC
Romblon	Eleandro Jesus Madrona	Liberal
Samar	Milagrosa Tan	PMP
Sarangani	Miguel Escobar	Lakas
Siquijor	Orlando Fua Sr.	Lakas
Sorsogon	Raul Lee	LDP
South Cotabato	Daisy Avance Fuentes	NPC
Southern Leyte	Rosette Lerias	NPC
Sultan Kudarat	Pax Mangudadatu	Kampi
Sulu	Yusop Jikiri	Lakas
Surigao del Norte	Robert Lyndon Barbers	Lakas
Surigao del Sur	Vicente Pimentel Jr.	Lakas
Tarlac	Jose Yap	NPC
Tawi-Tawi	No data	
Zambales	Vicente Magsaysay	Lakas
Zamboanga del Norte	Isagani Amatong	Lakas
Zamboanga del Sur	Aurora E. Cerilles	NPC
Zamboanga Sibugay	George T. Hofer	Kampi
Source: Commission on Elections

==== Vice gubernatorial elections ====
The following are the results of the vice gubernatorial elections by party:

Party	Seats
Lakas–NUCD–UMDP	33
Nationalist People's Coalition	15
Laban ng Demokratikong Pilipino	12
Liberal Party	4
Partido para sa Demokratikong Reporma	4
Alayon Alang sa Kalambu-an ng Kalinaw	1
Kabalikat ng Mamamayang Pilipino	1
Kilusang Bagong Lipunan	1
Partido Demokratiko Sosyalista ng Pilipinas	1
Partido ng Masang Pilipino	1
Partido Magdalo	1
Independents	4
No data	1
Total	79
Source: Commission on Elections

The following are the results of the vice gubernatorial elections by province:

Province	Elected vice governor	Party
Abra	Jaime Lo	PDSP
Agusan del Norte	Roberto Tejano	Lakas
Agusan del Sur	Virginia Getes	LDP
Aklan	Jean Rodriguez	LDP
Albay	Jesus Calisin	Lakas
Antique	Roberto Operiano	Lakas
Apayao	Paul Delwasen	NPC
Aurora	Annabelle Tangson	LDP
Basilan	Lukman Ampao	Independent
Bataan	Rogelio Roque	NPC
Batanes	Constante Castillejos	Liberal
Batangas	Peter Laurel	Lakas
Benguet	Edna Tabanda	NPC
Biliran	Carlos Chan	NPC
Bohol	Julius Caesar Herrera	Lakas
Bukidnon	Alex Calingasan	Lakas
Bulacan	Aurelio Plamenco	Lakas
Cagayan	Oscar Pagulayan	LDP
Camarines Norte	Alexis Pardo	LDP
Camarines Sur	Imelda Papin	LDP
Camiguin	Domingo Talian	Lakas
Capiz	Victor Tanco	Liberal
Catanduanes	Cesar Sarmiento	Reporma
Cavite	Jonvic Remulla	Magdalo
Cebu	John Henry Osmeña	Alayon
Compostela Valley	Ruwel Peter Gonzaga	Reporma
Cotabato	Jesus Sacdalan	Lakas
Davao del Norte	Victorio Suaybaguio Jr.	Kampi
Davao del Sur	Benjamin Bautista Jr.	NPC
Davao Oriental	Thelma Almario	Lakas
Eastern Samar	Federico Suyot	NPC
Guimaras	Edgardo Jabasa	Lakas
Ifugao	Bella Takinan	Independent
Ilocos Norte	Windell Chua	KBL
Ilocos Sur	Jerry Singson	Lakas
Iloilo	Roberto Armada	Lakas
Isabela	Santiago Respicio	Lakas
Kalinga	Joseph Delson	Lakas
La Union	Aureo Augusto Nisce	Lakas
Laguna	Dan Fernandez	NPC
Lanao del Norte	Timoteo Dacalos	Lakas
Lanao del Sur	Dimapuno Datu Ramos	LDP
Leyte	Nestor Villasin	Lakas
Maguindanao	Bimbo Sinsuat Sr.	PMP
Marinduque	Teodorito Rejano	Independent
Masbate	Edgar Legaspi	LDP
Misamis Occidental	Francisco Paylaga Jr.	Reporma
Misamis Oriental	Miguel de Jesus	LDP
Mountain Province	Anthony Wooden	Lakas
Negros Occidental	Isidro Zayco	Independent
Negros Oriental	Jose Baldado	Lakas
Northern Samar	Ramon Lubos	Liberal
Nueva Ecija	Eduardo Joson IV	NPC
Nueva Vizcaya	Luisa Cuaresma	LDP
Occidental Mindoro	Ramon Atienza	Lakas
Oriental Mindoro	Thaddeus Venturanza	Lakas
Palawan	David Ponce de Leon	NPC
Pampanga	Mikey Arroyo	Lakas
Pangasinan	Oscar Lambino	Lakas
Quezon	Jovito Talabong	Reporma
Quirino	Dakila Cua	LDP
Rizal	Jovita Rodriguez	Lakas
Romblon	Jose Cesar Fonte	Liberal
Samar	Ernesto Arcales	Lakas
Sarangani	Felipe Constantino	Lakas
Siquijor	Cyprus Olpoc	Lakas
Sorsogon	Antonio Escudero	NPC
South Cotabato	Eliordo Ogena	NPC
Southern Leyte	Eva Tomol	NPC
Sultan Kudarat	Miguel Domingo Jacalan III	Lakas
Sulu	Abdel Anni	Lakas
Surigao del Norte	Rodolfo Navarro	Lakas
Surigao del Sur	Librado Navarro	Lakas
Tarlac	Marcelino Aganon Jr.	NPC
Tawi-Tawi	No data	
Zambales	Ramon Lacbain II	LDP
Zamboanga del Norte	Eduardito Pacatang	Lakas
Zamboanga del Sur	Roseller Ariosa	NPC
Zamboanga Sibugay	Eugenio Famor	NPC
Source: Commission on Elections

==== Provincial board elections ====
The following are the results of the provincial board elections by party:

Party	Seats
Lakas–NUCD–UMDP	297
Nationalist People's Coalition	146
Laban ng Demokratikong Pilipino	85
Liberal Party	39
Partido ng Masang Pilipino	27
Partido para sa Demokratikong Reporma	26
Kabalikat ng Mamamayang Pilipino	8
Partido Demokratiko Sosyalista ng Pilipinas	8
PDP–Laban	8
Aksyon Demokratiko	6
Partido Isang Bansa, Isang Diwa	6
PROMDI	6
Partido Magdalo	5
Sama Sama Tarlac	5
Alayon Alang sa Kalambu-an ng Kalinaw	4
Kilusang Bagong Lipunan	3
Barug Alang sa Kauswagan ug Demokrasya/Alayon Alang sa Kalambu-an ng Kalinaw	2
Ompia Party	2
Partido Pundok Biliranon	2
Ummah Party	2
Akbayan	1
No party	3
Independents	44
No data	7
Total	742
Source: Commission on Elections

The following are the results of the provincial board elections by province:

Province	Elected seats	Party	Seats won
Abra	8	PDSP	6
Abra	8	Lakas	1
Abra	8	Independent	1
Agusan del Norte	8	Lakas	8
Agusan del Sur	10	LDP	8
Agusan del Sur	10	Lakas	2
Aklan	8	LDP	6
Aklan	8	Liberal	1
Aklan	8	Independent	1
Albay	10	Lakas	7
Albay	10	Aksyon	3
Antique	8	Lakas	5
Antique	8	NPC	2
Antique	8	Independent	1
Apayao	8	NPC	7
Apayao	8	Lakas	1
Aurora	8	Lakas	5
Aurora	8	LDP	3
Basilan	8	PMP	4
Basilan	8	Lakas	2
Basilan	8	LDP	1
Basilan	8	PDSP	1
Bataan	10	NPC	10
Batanes	6	Lakas	3
Batanes	6	Liberal	3
Batangas	10	Lakas	8
Batangas	10	LDP	2
Benguet	10	Lakas	5
Benguet	10	NPC	5
Biliran	8	NPC	6
Biliran	8	PPB	2
Bohol	10	PDP–Laban	6
Bohol	10	Lakas	4
Bukidnon	10	Lakas	6
Bukidnon	10	PMP	4
Bulacan	10	Lakas	9
Bulacan	10	PMP	1
Cagayan	10	LDP	3
Cagayan	10	NPC	3
Cagayan	10	Lakas	2
Cagayan	10	PMP	1
Cagayan	10	Independent	1
Camarines Norte	8	Lakas	4
Camarines Norte	8	LDP	2
Camarines Norte	8	NPC	2
Camarines Sur	10	LDP	5
Camarines Sur	10	NPC	2
Camarines Sur	10	Aksyon	1
Camarines Sur	10	Lakas	1
Camarines Sur	10	No party	1
Camiguin	8	Lakas	8
Capiz	10	Liberal	7
Capiz	10	Lakas	3
Catanduanes	8	Reporma	3
Catanduanes	8	Aksyon	2
Catanduanes	8	Lakas	2
Catanduanes	8	Independent	1
Cavite	10	Lakas	5
Cavite	10	Magdalo	5
Cebu	12	PROMDI	6
Cebu	12	Alayon	4
Cebu	12	Bakud/Alayon	2
Compostela Valley	10	Reporma	6
Compostela Valley	10	Lakas	4
Cotabato	10	PIBID	6
Cotabato	10	Lakas	2
Cotabato	10	NPC	1
Cotabato	10	Independent	1
Davao del Norte	10	Lakas	8
Davao del Norte	10	Kampi	1
Davao del Norte	10	Reporma	1
Davao del Sur	10	NPC	9
Davao del Sur	10	Lakas	1
Davao Oriental	10	Lakas	5
Davao Oriental	10	NPC	4
Davao Oriental	10	LDP	1
Eastern Samar	10	NPC	8
Eastern Samar	10	Lakas	2
Guimaras	8	Lakas	4
Guimaras	8	LDP	4
Ifugao	8	LDP	1
Ifugao	8	Independent	7
Ilocos Norte	10	Lakas	3
Ilocos Norte	10	KBL	3
Ilocos Norte	10	NPC	2
Ilocos Norte	10	No party	1
Ilocos Norte	10	Independent	1
Ilocos Sur	10	Lakas	8
Ilocos Sur	10	Liberal	2
Iloilo	10	LDP	5
Iloilo	10	Lakas	4
Iloilo	10	NPC	1
Isabela	10	NPC	5
Isabela	10	Lakas	3
Isabela	10	PMP	1
Isabela	10	No party	1
Kalinga	8	NPC	4
Kalinga	8	Lakas	2
Kalinga	8	LDP	1
Kalinga	8	Independent	1
La Union	10	Lakas	6
La Union	10	NPC	2
La Union	10	LDP	1
La Union	10	Liberal	1
Laguna	10	Lakas	5
Laguna	10	Kampi	2
Laguna	10	LDP	2
Laguna	10	PMP	1
Lanao del Norte	10	Lakas	8
Lanao del Norte	10	LDP	1
Lanao del Norte	10	Independent	1
Lanao del Sur	8	Ompia	2
Lanao del Sur	8	Ummah	2
Lanao del Sur	8	Lakas	1
Lanao del Sur	8	PDP–Laban	1
Lanao del Sur	8	Independent	2
Leyte	10	NPC	4
Leyte	10	Lakas	3
Leyte	10	LDP	2
Leyte	10	Liberal	1
Maguindanao	10	PMP	7
Maguindanao	10	Lakas	2
Maguindanao	10	Akbayan	1
Marinduque	8	Lakas	3
Marinduque	8	PDP–Laban	1
Marinduque	8	Independent	4
Masbate	10	Lakas	5
Masbate	10	Reporma	3
Masbate	10	Liberal	1
Masbate	10	PMP	1
Misamis Occidental	8	Reporma	4
Misamis Occidental	8	Lakas	3
Misamis Occidental	8	NPC	1
Misamis Oriental	10	LDP	8
Misamis Oriental	10	Lakas	2
Mountain Province	8	Lakas	2
Mountain Province	8	Liberal	1
Mountain Province	8	Independent	5
Negros Occidental	12	Independent	12
Negros Oriental	10	Lakas	6
Negros Oriental	10	NPC	3
Negros Oriental	10	LDP	1
Northern Samar	10	Liberal	7
Northern Samar	10	Lakas	3
Nueva Ecija	10	NPC	10
Nueva Vizcaya	10	LDP	6
Nueva Vizcaya	10	Lakas	2
Nueva Vizcaya	10	NPC	2
Occidental Mindoro	10	Lakas	7
Occidental Mindoro	10	Reporma	2
Occidental Mindoro	10	LDP	1
Oriental Mindoro	10	Lakas	5
Oriental Mindoro	10	Liberal	4
Oriental Mindoro	10	LDP	1
Palawan	10	Lakas	6
Palawan	10	NPC	3
Palawan	10	Kampi	1
Pampanga	10	Lakas	4
Pampanga	10	NPC	4
Pampanga	10	Liberal	1
Pampanga	10	Independent	1
Pangasinan	12	Lakas	10
Pangasinan	12	NPC	1
Pangasinan	12	Independent	1
Quezon	10	Lakas	5
Quezon	10	Reporma	3
Quezon	10	Liberal	2
Quirino	8	LDP	7
Quirino	8	Independent	1
Rizal	10	NPC	7
Rizal	10	Lakas	1
Rizal	10	LDP	1
Rizal	10	Liberal	1
Romblon	8	Liberal	4
Romblon	8	Lakas	3
Romblon	8	Reporma	1
Samar	10	Lakas	7
Samar	10	Liberal	2
Samar	10	PMP	1
Sarangani	8	Lakas	7
Sarangani	8	PMP	1
Siquijor	8	Lakas	7
Siquijor	8	PMP	1
Sorsogon	10	NPC	5
Sorsogon	10	Lakas	3
Sorsogon	10	LDP	1
Sorsogon	10	Liberal	1
South Cotabato	10	NPC	8
South Cotabato	10	LDP	1
South Cotabato	10	Independent	1
Southern Leyte	8	NPC	4
Southern Leyte	8	Lakas	3
Southern Leyte	8	LDP	1
Sultan Kudarat	10	NPC	6
Sultan Kudarat	10	Kampi	2
Sultan Kudarat	10	Lakas	2
Sulu	8	Lakas	5
Sulu	8	PMP	3
Surigao del Norte	10	Lakas	6
Surigao del Norte	10	LDP	4
Surigao del Sur	10	Lakas	5
Surigao del Sur	10	NPC	4
Surigao del Sur	10	LDP	1
Tarlac	10	SST	5
Tarlac	10	Lakas	4
Tarlac	10	LDP	1
Tawi-Tawi	8	LDP	1
Tawi-Tawi	8	No data	7
Zambales	10	NPC	3
Zambales	10	Reporma	3
Zambales	10	Lakas	2
Zambales	10	LDP	2
Zamboanga del Norte	10	Lakas	7
Zamboanga del Norte	10	NPC	1
Zamboanga del Norte	10	PDSP	1
Zamboanga del Norte	10	PMP	1
Zamboanga del Sur	10	Lakas	5
Zamboanga del Sur	10	NPC	4
Zamboanga del Sur	10	Independent	1
Zamboanga Sibugay	10	Lakas	5
Zamboanga Sibugay	10	NPC	3
Zamboanga Sibugay	10	Kampi	2
Source: Commission on Elections

==== Mayoral elections ====
The following are the results of the mayoral elections in highly urbanized and independent component cities and independent municipalities by party:

Party	Seats
Lakas–NUCD–UMDP	15
Laban ng Demokratikong Pilipino	5
Nationalist People's Coalition	5
Partido ng Masang Pilipino	2
PDP–Laban	2
PROMDI	2
Kabayani	1
Kabalikat ng Mamamayang Pilipino	1
Liberal Party	1
Independents	2
Total	36
Source: Commission on Elections

The following are the results of the mayoral elections in highly urbanized and independent component cities and independent municipalities:

City/Municipality	Elected mayor	Party
Angeles City	Carmelo Lazatin Sr.	Lakas
Bacolod	Luzviminda Valdez	Lakas
Baguio	Bernardo Vergara	NPC
Butuan	Leonides Theresa Plaza	LDP
Cagayan de Oro	Vicente Emano	LDP
Caloocan	Rey Malonzo	Lakas
Cebu City	Tomas Osmeña	PROMDI
Cotabato City	Muslimin Sema	Lakas
Dagupan	Benjamin Lim	Lakas
Davao City	Rodrigo Duterte	PDP–Laban
General Santos	Pedro Acharon Jr.	NPC
Iligan	Franklin Quijano	LDP
Iloilo City	Jerry Treñas	Lakas
Las Piñas	Vergel Aguilar	Independent
Lucena	Ramon Talaga Jr.	Lakas
Makati	Jejomar Binay	PDP–Laban
Malabon	Amado Vicencio	NPC
Mandaluyong	Benhur Abalos	Lakas
Mandaue	Thadeo Ouano	PROMDI
Manila	Lito Atienza	Liberal
Marikina	Marides Fernando	Kabayani
Muntinlupa	Jaime Fresnedi	Lakas
Naga	Jesse Robredo	Lakas
Navotas	Toby Tiangco	NPC
Olongapo	Katherine Gordon	Lakas
Ormoc	Carmelo Locsin	NPC
Parañaque	Joey Marquez	Lakas
Pasay	Wenceslao Trinidad	LDP
Pasig	Soledad Eusebio	Lakas
Pateros	Rosendo Capco	Kampi
Quezon City	Feliciano Belmonte Jr.	Lakas
San Juan	JV Ejercito	PMP
Santiago	Jose Miranda	PMP
Taguig	Sigfrido Tiñga	Independent
Valenzuela	Bobbit Carlos	Lakas
Zamboanga City	Maria Clara Lobregat	LDP
Source: Commission on Elections

==== Vice mayoral elections ====
The following are the results of the vice mayoral elections in highly urbanized and independent component cities and independent municipalities by party:

Party	Seats
Lakas–NUCD–UMDP	12
Laban ng Demokratikong Pilipino	5
PDP–Laban	4
Nationalist People's Coalition	3
Liberal Party	2
PROMDI	2
Aksyon Demokratiko	1
Kabayani	1
Lapian ng Masang Pilipino	1
Partido ng Masang Pilipino	1
Independents	4
Total	36
Source: Commission on Elections

The following are the results of the vice mayoral elections in highly urbanized and independent component cities and independent municipalities:

City/Municipality	Elected vice mayor	Party
Angeles City	Ricardo Zalamea	Lakas
Bacolod	Ramiro Garcia Jr.	Independent
Baguio	Betty Lourdes Tabanda	Lakas
Butuan	Angelo Calo	LDP
Cagayan de Oro	John Elizaga	LDP
Caloocan	Tito Varela	Lakas
Cebu City	Mike Rama	PROMDI
Cotabato City	Japal Guiani Jr.	Liberal
Dagupan	Alvin Fernandez	Lakas
Davao City	Luis Bonguyan	PDP–Laban
General Santos	Florentino Congson	LDP
Iligan	Lawrence Cruz	Independent
Iloilo City	Victor Facultad	Independent
Las Piñas	Luis Bustamante	Lakas
Lucena	Roderick Alcala	Liberal
Makati	Ernesto Mercado	PDP–Laban
Malabon	Mark Allan Jay Yambao	NPC
Mandaluyong	Jesus Cruz	Lakas
Mandaue	Amadeo Seno Jr.	PROMDI
Manila	Danny Lacuna	PDP–Laban
Marikina	Marion Andres	Kabayani
Muntinlupa	Jo Jason Alcaraz	Lakas
Naga	Esteban Abonal Jr.	Aksyon
Navotas	Lutgardo Cruz	NPC
Olongapo	Cynthia Cajudo	Lakas
Ormoc	Celso Adolfo	LAMMP
Parañaque	Florencio Bernabe Jr.	Lakas
Pasay	Antonino Calixto	LDP
Pasig	Lorna Bernardo	Lakas
Pateros	Willie Buenaventura	Lakas
Quezon City	Herbert Bautista	Independent
San Juan	Leonardo Celles	PMP
Santiago	Clarito Manubay	PDP–Laban
Taguig	Maria Loida Labao-Alzona	Lakas
Valenzuela	Antonio Espiritu	NPC
Zamboanga City	Erbie Fabian	LDP
Source: Commission on Elections

==== City and municipal council elections ====
The following are the results of the city and municipal council elections in highly urbanized and independent component cities and independent municipalities by party:

Party	Seats
Lakas–NUCD–UMDP	179
Laban ng Demokratikong Pilipino	66
Nationalist People's Coalition	49
Liberal Party	38
PDP–Laban	33
PROMDI	21
Partido ng Masang Pilipino	17
Aksyon Demokratiko	12
Kabayani	10
Nacionalista Party	9
Kabalikat ng Mamamayang Pilipino	7
People Power Coalition	7
Padayon Pilipino	3
Partido para sa Demokratikong Reporma	3
Akbayan	1
Bayan Muna	1
Kugi Uswag Sugbo	1
Paglaum Party	1
Independents	14
Total	472
Source: Commission on Elections

The following are the results of the city and municipal council elections in highly urbanized and independent component cities and independent municipalities:

City/municipality	Elected seats	Party	Seats won
Angeles City	10	Lakas	10
Bacolod	12	Lakas	1
Bacolod	12	Liberal	1
Bacolod	12	Paglaum	1
Bacolod	12	PDP–Laban	1
Bacolod	12	Independent	8
Baguio	12	Lakas	8
Baguio	12	PDP–Laban	3
Baguio	12	Reporma	1
Butuan	10	LDP	8
Butuan	10	Lakas	1
Butuan	10	Independent	1
Cagayan de Oro	12	LDP	12
Caloocan	12	Lakas	7
Caloocan	12	LDP	2
Caloocan	12	NPC	2
Caloocan	12	PPC	1
Cebu City	16	PROMDI	11
Cebu City	16	Padayon	3
Cebu City	16	Kusug	1
Cebu City	16	NPC	1
Cotabato City	10	Lakas	6
Cotabato City	10	Akbayan	1
Cotabato City	10	Aksyon	1
Cotabato City	10	Kampi	1
Cotabato City	10	Reporma	1
Dagupan	10	Lakas	7
Dagupan	10	Aksyon	3
Davao City	24	LDP	7
Davao City	24	NPC	7
Davao City	24	Lakas	6
Davao City	24	Bayan Muna	1
Davao City	24	PDP–Laban	1
Davao City	24	Reporma	1
Davao City	24	Independent	1
General Santos	12	NPC	4
General Santos	12	PMP	4
General Santos	12	LDP	3
General Santos	12	Lakas	1
Iligan	10	LDP	6
Iligan	10	Lakas	2
Iligan	10	NPC	2
Iloilo City	12	Lakas	8
Iloilo City	12	LDP	2
Iloilo City	12	Liberal	2
Las Piñas	12	Lakas	12
Lucena	10	Lakas	6
Lucena	10	Liberal	4
Makati	16	PDP–Laban	12
Makati	16	Aksyon	1
Makati	16	LDP	1
Makati	16	Nacionalista	1
Makati	16	Independent	1
Malabon	14	NPC	9
Malabon	14	Lakas	5
Mandaluyong	12	Lakas	10
Mandaluyong	12	LDP	1
Mandaluyong	12	PMP	1
Mandaue	10	PROMDI	10
Manila	36	Liberal	29
Manila	36	Lakas	3
Manila	36	NPC	2
Manila	36	LDP	1
Manila	36	PDP–Laban	1
Marikina	12	Kabayani	10
Marikina	12	Liberal	1
Marikina	12	PDP–Laban	1
Muntinlupa	16	Lakas	14
Muntinlupa	16	LDP	2
Naga	10	Aksyon	7
Naga	10	Lakas	3
Navotas	12	NPC	11
Navotas	12	Lakas	1
Olongapo	10	Nacionalista	8
Olongapo	10	Lakas	1
Olongapo	10	Independent	1
Ormoc	10	Lakas	8
Ormoc	10	NPC	2
Parañaque	12	Lakas	9
Parañaque	12	PDP–Laban	2
Parañaque	12	NPC	1
Pasay	12	Lakas	7
Pasay	12	LDP	3
Pasay	12	PDP–Laban	2
Pasig	12	Lakas	12
Pateros	12	Lakas	6
Pateros	12	Kampi	3
Pateros	12	PDP–Laban	2
Pateros	12	Liberal	1
Quezon City	24	Lakas	14
Quezon City	24	LDP	8
Quezon City	24	NPC	1
Quezon City	24	Independent	1
San Juan	12	PMP	12
Santiago	10	PDP–Laban	7
Santiago	10	Lakas	3
Taguig	12	Lakas	6
Taguig	12	PPC	6
Valenzuela	12	NPC	7
Valenzuela	12	Kampi	3
Valenzuela	12	Lakas	1
Valenzuela	12	Independent	1
Zamboanga City	12	LDP	10
Zamboanga City	12	Lakas	1
Zamboanga City	12	PDP–Laban	1
Source: Commission on Elections

== See also ==
- Commission on Elections
- Politics of the Philippines
- Philippine elections
- Philippine midterm election
- 12th Congress of the Philippines
