= EDSA III =

2001 Philippine protests after former President Joseph Estrada's arrest

May 1 Riots EDSA III
- Date: April 25–May 1, 2001
- Location: Manila, Philippines
- Caused by: Arrest of newly deposed President Joseph Estrada
- Methods: Protest; Riot
- Result: Riots suppressed; declaration of a state of rebellion and arrest leaders of the opposition.

Parties
Philippine government: Lakas; People Power Coalition; Armed Forces; Presidential Security Group; Philippine National Police	Opposition, Estrada loyalists: Pwersa ng Masang Pilipino; Laban ng Demokratikong Pilipino; Puwersa ng Masa; People's Movement Against Poverty; Labor Reform Bloc; Union of the Masses for Democracy and Justice; Other Mass Organizations; Marcos Loyalists; Estrada loyalists; El Shaddai; Iglesia ni Cristo

Lead figures
Gloria Macapagal Arroyo; Angelo Reyes; Leandro Mendoza	Loi Ejercito; Ronald Lumbao; Roberto Oca; Virgilio Eustaquio; Miriam Defensor Santiago; Oliver Lozano; Didagen Dilangalen; JV Ejercito; Juan Ponce Enrile; Imelda Marcos; Panfilo Lacson; Gringo Honasan; Eraño Manalo

Number
	700,000 - 3 Million protesters 50,000 (Opposition, government claim)

Casualties and losses
3 officers wounded	4 dead, many injured

The May 1 Riots, or EDSA III (or EDSA Tres, the Spanish word for "three"), were protests sparked by the arrest of newly deposed president Joseph Estrada of the Philippines from April 25 to May 1, 2001. The protest was held for 7 days on a major highway in Metro Manila, Epifanio de los Santos Avenue (EDSA), which eventually culminated in an attempt to storm the Malacañang Palace.

Taking place four months after the Second EDSA Revolution, the protests were considered as a more populist uprising in comparison to the previous demonstrations in the same location in January 2001. The protests and the attack on the presidential palace, however, failed in their objectives. Participants continue to claim that it was a genuine People Power event, a claim disputed by the participants and supporters of EDSA II. President Gloria Macapagal Arroyo has acknowledged the divisive nature of the two terminologies by saying in one statement that she hoped to be the president of "EDSA II and EDSA III".

== Background ==
The Second EDSA Revolution (or EDSA II) in January 2001 saw the ouster of Joseph Estrada as Philippine president and Vice President Gloria Macapagal Arroyo succeeding him.

Despite the ouster, Senator Miriam Defensor Santiago expressed vehement support for Estrada and opposition to Arroyo's presidency throughout her reelection campaign in early 2001. Her speeches were marked by hyperbolic statements and inflammatory rhetoric: among others, she mentioned that if Estrada is arrested, she will jump off an airplane without a parachute in response, and there would be the possibility of civil war "in Luzon, the Visayas and Mindanao". Loi Ejercito, the wife of Estrada, also claimed during her Senate campaign speech on April 4, 2001 that arresting him will cause people to "get mad" and "revolt".

In mid-April 2001, hundreds of supporters of former president Joseph Estrada situated themselves outside the gates of North Greenhills subdivision in Greenhills, San Juan where Estrada resided in an attempt to guard him from arrest. At this time, residents of a resettlement site that Estrada established in Taytay, Rizal planned to soon stage a protest against his arrest, with a businesswoman from the area stating her firm belief in his innocence: "If Estrada is arrested, we will stage People Power III."

On April 19, Estrada's birthday, the former president visited the resettlement site for his customary birthday celebration in the area and gave a radio interview mentioning that he was ready to give himself over to authorities upon arrest, stating that "I always submit myself to the rule of law." In addition, he discouraged his supporters from becoming violent: "I want to fight off these charges in a peaceful way."

== April 24: Prelude to arrest ==
On April 24, 2001, the Sandiganbayan ordered the arrest of Estrada, his son San Juan mayor Jinggoy Estrada, gambling consultant Charlie Atong Ang, and lawyer Edward Serapio over charges of plunder and graft. As early as 6:00 am the next day, six thousand police officers at Camp Crame in Quezon City stood by for the order to arrest Estrada, headed by Philippine National Police (PNP) chief Director-General Leandro Mendoza alongside troopers of the Philippine Marine Corps and the PNP Special Action Force in seven vehicles and five buses.

However, an estimated 6,000 loyalists of Estrada had mobilized to Greenhills to block the police and military from arresting the former president. The PNP had floated the possibility of having to forcibly airlift Estrada from his home with airborne troops if the police squad headed by Mendoza was unable to enter the subdivision, as loyalists blocked the combined police and military forces from accessing the subdivision's Buchanan gate along Club Filipino Avenue with a blockade made out of jeepneys and human barricades.

At 2:00 pm, the situation between the police and the loyalists became tense when anti-riot personnel began approaching the human barricades. Out of fear of antagonizing the loyalists and instigating a riot, the anti-riot personnel withdrew. However, at around 3 pm, the police and military forces aborted the operation for the day as the Sandiganbayan had not yet issued the warrant for Estrada's arrest.

== April 25–30: Arrest of Joseph Estrada and EDSA rallies ==
On April 25, the Sandiganbayan finally issued the arrest order at noon. At 3:00 pm, court-appointed sheriff Ed Urieta, two thousand police officers, and troopers of the Philippine Marine Corps accompanied by PNP Chief Mendoza arrived at Estrada's home and served the warrant. The arresting team escorted Estrada and his son Jinggoy into a PNP-owned Toyota Coaster to take them both to a detention center at Camp Crame. Estrada's lawyers were able to persuade the police to let them ride in a private vehicle instead of the police Coaster, as armed police officers escorted a privately owned van as it moved out of the North Greenhills subdivision towards Camp Crame.

After both Estrada and his son were processed and put into a cell, Estrada released a statement maintaining his innocence and denounced the Arroyo government's efforts to persecute him as a "violation of his human rights", calling Filipinos to "witness this denial of justice and mockery of the Bill of Rights."

As a result, a crowd of an alleged 700,000 loyalists (although according to Eagle Broadcasting Corporation-owned broadcast network Net 25 and to Senator Tito Sotto, a high of over 3 million in the evening from April 25–30), most of whom were members of the urban poor and devotees of the Iglesia ni Cristo, which institutionally supported Estrada, gathered at the Roman Catholic EDSA Shrine, the site of the January EDSA II revolt that had toppled Estrada from the presidency. There was no uniform consensus on the number of protesters in EDSA III. Police estimated around 150,000 pro-Estrada protesters at EDSA Shrine on April 26, which decreased to around 65,000 on April 29 before morning. Meanwhile, the Puwersa ng Masa coalition, which mainly consisted of candidates from the Laban ng Demokratikong Pilipino and the Pwersa ng Masang Pilipino parties, claimed that at least 50,000 joined the rally as of April 26. Some personalities who went into the crowd to observe the rallies in late April included historian Manolo Quezon and activist Ronald Llamas.

News organizations aiming to cover the rally were advised not to approach the area, as there were reports of hostility towards cameramen, particularly those from ABS-CBN and GMA. Rally leaders also refused to give interviews to newspaper media representatives, claiming that the news organizations were biased against Estrada. Estrada's son, JV Ejercito, later apologized for the hostility of the protesters and requested the news organizations to cover the event, assuring the safety of their journalists. However, Net 25 and foreign news organizations such as CNN, BBC, NHK, and Reuters were able to provide coverage of the protests.

The protest was led by members of the political opposition of the time, most notably Senators Juan Ponce Enrile, Vicente Sotto III, Gringo Honasan, Panfilo Lacson and Miriam Defensor-Santiago.

On the night of April 30, the scene turned violent as riot police fired warning shots and tear gas on crowds of supporters of Estrada. Some of the estimated 20,000 marchers picked up abandoned shields and raided a construction site for scrap wood to use as clubs. Volleys of shots later rang out from a second line of officers, and again when the crowds reached the palace and tried to force their way into the fenced compound. They then broke through a third police line, the last before a phalanx of heavily armed officers that waited at Mendiola, a key bridge entrance to the presidential palace. A policeman, laying injured and bloody, was pelted with rocks by protesters. Marchers used a dump truck to break through an initial line of riot police who dropped their plastic shields and scattered. At least one person died and many injured as thousands of protestors clashed with riot police outside the palace.

== May 1: Estrada supporters march to Malacañang ==
The rebellion sought to remove Arroyo from the presidency and reinstate Estrada. The rebellion came to a head in the early morning of May 1, 2001, as most of the people left EDSA Shrine, specifically the Iglesia ni Cristo members, as an agreement between their leaders and the government occurred. However, pro-Estrada demonstrators still stormed towards Malacañang Palace, the presidential residence. The number of protesters overwhelmed anti-riot police patrolling all possible routes to Manila, such as Ortigas Avenue and Santolan Road. Some of the protesters approaching Malacañang were even met with little resistance, with the government blockade mistaking the crowd for a pro-government rally. Pro-Estrada protesters were "prepared" for the storming, as demonstrators were reported to breach blockade outposts with dump trucks and homemade firearms. Estimates of the number of protestors who stormed Malacañang varied. The Philippine Star reported at least 50,000 pro-Estrada demonstrators who marched to Malacanang on the dawn of May 1. Meanwhile, a report from the Philippine Center for Investigative Journalism stated that around 150,000 Estrada supporters marched towards Malacañang.

Two of Estrada's sons, JV Ejercito and Jude Estrada, were observed marching with the crowd and leaving before they reached Mendiola Street. Several broadcast vans of ABS-CBN were torched by members of the crowd, while others attacked the police and soldiers with rocks, sticks, and pipes. The government continued enforcing a "maximum tolerance" policy for the police and military in responding to the protesters, with them dispersing the marchers with warning shots and tear gases. Although the Daily Tribune denounced in its editorial the "bloodbath" caused by the alleged "excessive military and police might used against the masses", the enforcement of the "maximum tolerance" policy was later credited by other news organizations with preventing an escalation of the violence.

President Arroyo declared a state of rebellion in the National Capital Region pursuant to Proclamation No. 38 and arrested leaders who participated in the said rebellion, such as Senator Juan Ponce Enrile and former ambassador Ernesto Maceda, but released them on bail. She also announced the death of two police officers, expressing sympathy towards their families. Journalists however later corrected their initial reports and stated that one officer (PO1 Grant Fausto Savedia) turned out to be alive while the other officer was killed in Manila in a prior incident unrelated to the riots.

According to CNN, they interviewed on the phone with President Arroyo and told them that rebellions are no more and that many of the plotters have been arrested.

=== Casualties ===
Three protesters and one bystander were killed during the riots and dispersal. Around 113 were reported to be injured.

1. Jhun Bado
2. Efren Malacer, 32
3. Raul T. Rosal, 30, employee of Friends of Gringo Honasan Movement (FOGHOM)
4. Tiburcio Arciage, 54, bystander

== Aftermath ==
On May 7, 2001, President Arroyo lifted the notice of a state of rebellion. Hours after the crowds of EDSA III were dispersed, representatives of the Archdiocese of Manila and Civil Society supporters of the Arroyo administration reclaimed the EDSA Shrine where there had been alleged acts of vandalism and desecration of the site.

Unlike previous upheavals under the EDSA name, EDSA III was marred by widespread destruction and vandalism of public utilities (stop lights and street posts were thrown down), torching of media equipment, particularly those of ABS-CBN, and attacks on stores fronting the protest routes at Claro M. Recto Avenue, Legarda Street, Chino Roces (Mendiola) Street, Rizal Avenue, Nicanor Reyes (Morayta Street), and Quezon Boulevard as protesters approached Malacañang Palace and retreated after intervention of the police and military.

Most of the protesters arrested who were unable to post bail were later pardoned and set free. Several public figures who supported the rallies, including Enrile and Honasan, denied involvement in the protests. JV Ejercito remarked that the May 1 storming was a "spontaneous gathering". On the other hand, Miriam Defensor-Santiago openly defended the demonstrations. President Arroyo remarked in a statement that the alleged leaders of EDSA III only incited the demonstrators to storm Malacañang and were "hiding in fear" from the arrests.

President Arroyo gave an award to Navy Lt. Cmdr. Edwin Mackay on May 23, 2001 for leading his Navy contingent in the defense of Malacañang during the riots.

On July 3, 2001, the Department of Justice dropped charges against 147 pro-Estrada rallyists upon the orders of President Arroyo, with the protesters signing affidavits that stated "they had nothing to do with the siege and that they were merely used." Three days later, they were released from the custody of the Department of Social Welfare and Development and Pampanga Governor Lito Lapid.

On October 20, 2001, an arrest warrant was issued by the Manila Regional Trial Court Branch 27 against Ronald Lumbao, spokesman of the People's Movement Against Poverty (PMAP), due to charges of rebellion for his alleged role as leader in the attempted storming of Malacañang by rallyists on May 1. On April 25, 2002, Lumbao was captured by police authorities in an apartment building in Quezon City.

== Criticism ==
Critics of EDSA III, styled after the People Power Revolution (EDSA Revolution) and EDSA Revolution of 2001, argue that while this was a major protest, the spirit of it was unlike of the first and second protests. Supporters of EDSA III allege that EDSA I and II participants were made up of the professional–managerial class and as such not democratically representative unlike those who had participated in EDSA III. Other arguments also point to the success of the first two to remove the presidents targeted, versus this event's failure to do so.
