= Pwersa ng Masang Pilipino =

Populist political party in the Philippines

- President: Joseph Estrada
- Founder: Joseph Estrada
- Founded: August 20, 1991; 35 years ago
- Headquarters: Pasay
- Ideology: Populism
- Political position: Big tent
- National affiliation: UniTeam (2021–2024); HNP (2018–2021); PGP (2015–2016); UNA (2012–2015); Genuine Opposition (2007); KNP (2004); Puwersa ng Masa (2001); LAMMP (1997–2001); NPC (1995)
- Colors: Orange; Green
- Senate: 1 / 24
- House of Representatives: 0 / 317
- Provincial governors: 0 / 82
- Provincial vice governors: 0 / 82

Website
- fb/Pwersa ng Masang Pilipino

The Pwersa ng Masang Pilipino (lit. 'Force of the Filipino Masses'), formerly Partido ng Masang Pilipino (lit. 'Party of the Filipino Masses'), is a populist political party in the Philippines. It is the political party of former Philippine President Joseph E. Estrada. In the May 1998 presidential election, it aligned itself with other political parties to form the Laban ng Makabayang Masang Pilipino (Struggle of the Patriotic Filipino Masses). Estrada won the presidential election, and the party later led the Puwersa ng Masa opposition coalition in 2001. The party originated from an organization that was an offshoot of the Economic Recovery Action Program in 1990.

== History ==
=== Partido ng Masang Pilipino ===
==== Formation ====
PMP's logo as early as 1990s when the acronym is still Partido ng Masang Pilipino

Originally named the Partido ng Masang Pilipino, the Pwersa ng Masang Pilipino emanated from an organization which was an offshoot of the Economic Recovery Action Program (ERAP) organized by George S. Antonio in May 1990. The ERAP organization was formally launched on October 4, 1990 with 21 original members.

The organization grew exponentially with the recruitment of members nationwide. It was then that the PMP was accredited as a political party with the objective of helping to uplift the lives of the Filipino people, especially the poor and the disadvantaged, through effective and efficient social and economic reforms. Its first campaign headquarters was located at the 4th floor of San Buena Building, EDSA corner Shaw Boulevard, Mandaluyong. On August 20, 1991, PMP was formally accredited as a national political party.

==== 1992: Erap's victory ====
In 1992, PMP took its first major political step by fielding then-Senator Joseph Estrada as its presidential candidate. But, after being convinced by a religious sect to be Danding Cojuangco's runningmate, Estrada slide down as vice presidential candidate. Cojuangco is the founder and standard-bearer of the Nationalist People's Coalition (NPC), which Estrada also joined. Estrada overwhelmingly won the vice-presidency, defeating former Chief Justice Marcelo Fernan of the Laban ng Demokratikong Pilipino (LDP) along with five other candidates.

==== 1998: LAMMP and Erap's presidency ====
In 1997, a permanent and fully operational headquarters was established at 409 Shaw Boulevard in Mandaluyong. In the 1998 Philippine general election, PMP was very much involved in the election with the candidacy of Estrada as president and other local candidates nationwide. PMP played a lead role in the establishment of the opposition coalition Laban ng Makabayang Masang Pilipino (LAMMP), which also counted among its members the LDP (formerly known as Laban), NPC and PDP–Laban. The coalition fielded full slates for the national and local levels. Card-bearing members reached as high as 3.2 million nationwide. Estrada won the presidential election, garnering almost 11 million votes and defeating nine other candidates including House Speaker Jose de Venecia Jr. of Lakas–NUCD–UMDP.

==== 2001: Pwersa ng Masa ====
In 2001, PMP led the opposition coalition, fielding senatorial candidates from People's Reform Party and LDP as well as independent candidates. The Puwersa ng Masa coalition won four seats in the Senate, including one for Estrada's wife Luisa "Loi" Ejercito Estrada.

=== Pwersa ng Masang Pilipino ===
==== 2003: Koalisyon ng Nagkakaisang Pilipino ====
PMP logo used in 2010 while Estrada was campaigning

In 2003, the party's name Partido ng Masang Pilipino was changed to Pwersa ng Masang Pilipino. In April 2004, the PMP agreed to enter into a coalition with the LDP and PDP–Laban to form the Koalisyon ng Nagkakaisang Pilipino (KNP), the dominant opposition coalition for the 2004 Philippine general election. The coalition fielded actor Fernando Poe Jr. and Senator Loren Legarda (who recently bolt Lakas) as candidates for president and vice-president, respectively. Poe and Legarda lost the election to incumbent President Gloria Macapagal Arroyo and Senator Noli de Castro.

==== 2008 ====
On January 18, 2008, PMP placed full-page advertisements in Metro Manila newspapers, blaming EDSA 2 of having "inflicted a dent on Philippine democracy". Its featured clippings questioned the constitutionality of the revolution. The published featured clippings were taken from Time, New York Times, Straits Times, Los Angeles Times, Washington Post, Asia Times Online, The Economist, and International Herald Tribune. Former Supreme Court justice Cecilia Muñoz Palma opined that EDSA 2 violated the 1987 Constitution.

Alfredo Lim, on August 20, 2008, resigned as head of Joseph Estrada's Pwersa ng Masang Pilipino (Partido ng Masang Pilipino – PMP) following a PMP's executive committee resolution removing him as president of the party. He was replaced by Joseph Estrada who is also the PMP chairman.

==== 2010: Erap–Binay ====
In 2010, Estrada launched his comeback bid for presidency, tapping longtime ally and Makati Mayor Jejomar Binay. Even though Estrada lost to Liberal Senator Noynoy Aquino, Binay clinched victory against Liberal Mar Roxas (a former Estrada cabinet member).

== PMP-affiliated parties ==
- Partido Magdiwang – San Juan
- Partido Navoteño – Navotas
- Asenso Manileño – Manila (2013-2019)
- Partido Magdalo – Cavite
- Hugpong ng Pagbabago – Davao Region

== Notable members ==
- Joseph Estrada – 13th President of Philippines, 11th Vice President, Senator, former San Juan Mayor, former Manila Mayor
- Loi Estrada – Former Senator and 12th First Lady of the Philippines
- Jinggoy Estrada – Acting Senate President, 22nd Senate President Pro-Temporate of the Philippines, Senator, former San Juan Mayor and Vice-Mayor.
- Juan Ponce Enrile – 26th Senate President, Senator, Minister (Secretary) of National Defense, Assemblyman for Cagayan Valley, and Congressman of the 1st District of Cagayan.
- Joseph Victor Ejercito – Senator, Congressman & former mayor of San Juan; Lone district of San Juan
- Guia Gomez – Mayor of San Juan, First Lady of San Juan (to then Mayor Joseph Ejercito-Estrada)
- Tobias Reynald Tiangco – Congressman & former mayor of Navotas; Lone district of Navotas
- John Reynald Tiangco – Mayor of Navotas
- Melencio "Jun" De Sagun, Jr. – former mayor of Trece Martires
- Melandres De Sagun – Mayor of Trece Martires
- Leonisa Joana "Ona" Virata – Mayor of General Mariano Alvarez, Cavite
- Harry William Acosta – Sangguniang Kabataan Federation, Pasay, former PMP Youth Chairman of National Capital Region
- Didagen "Digs" Dilangalen – former Congressman of 1st district of Maguindanao
- Atty. Rufus Rodriguez – Congressman of 2nd district of Cagayan de Oro City
- Jonvic Remulla – Governor of Cavite
- Boying Remulla – Congressman of 7th District of Cavite
- Jocel Baac – Governor of Kalinga
- Emilio Ramon Ejercito – Governor of Laguna
- Armando Sanchez – former governor of Batangas (deceased)
- Lito Atienza – former mayor of Manila, Mambabatas Pambansa (Assemblyman) from Manila, Vice Mayor of Manila, Secretary of Environment and Natural Resources
- Connie Dy – former Representative of Pasay
- Hermogenes "HB" Perez, Sr. – former mayor of Hagonoy, Bulacan
- Roberto Oca – former mayor of Pandi, Bulacan
- Edwin C. Santos – Businessman Obando, Bulacan
- Romeo G. Ramos – Mayor Cavite City
- Francisco M. Domagoso – Mayor of Manila, former Vice Mayor of Manila, former director of North Luzon Railways Corporation, former undersecretary of Social Welfare and Development
- Gary Jayson Ejercito-Estrada – Incumbent Board Member of Quezon Province 2nd district

== Candidates ==
=== For Philippine General Elections 2010 ===
- Joseph Estrada – Presidential Candidate (lost)
- Jejomar Binay – Vice-Presidential Candidate (won)

Senatorial Slate (8)

- JV Bautista (lost)
- Juan Ponce Enrile (won)
- Jinggoy Estrada (won)
- Jun Lozada (lost)
- Regalado Maambong (lost)
- Francisco Tatad (lost)
- Rodolfo Plaza (lost)
- Joey de Venecia (lost)

=== For the 2013 Philippine general election ===
Senatorial Slate (9): United Nationalist Alliance

- Nancy Binay, PDP–Laban (won)
- Tingting Cojuangco, PDP–Laban (lost)
- JV Ejercito Estrada, PMP (won)
- Jack Enrile, Nationalist People's Coalition (lost)
- Dick Gordon, Bagumbayan-VNP (lost)
- Gringo Honasan, Independent (won)
- Ernesto Maceda, Jr., PMP (lost)
- Mitos Magsaysay, PDP–Laban (lost)
- Migz Zubiri, PMP (lost)

=== For the 2016 Philippine general election ===
- Rommel Mendoza – Presidential Candidate (backed out, supported the candidacy of former Vice President Jejomar Binay)

Senatorial Slate

- Isko Moreno (lost)
- Sandra Cam (lost)

== Electoral performance ==
=== Presidential and vice presidential elections ===
Year	Presidential election			Vice presidential election		
Year	Candidate	Vote share	Result	Candidate	Vote share	Result
1992	None (Note: Estrada originally ran as president, but withdraw candidacy.)		Fidel Ramos (Lakas–NUCD)	None (Note: Estrada ran as candidate of NPC, even though retaining PMP membership.)		Joseph Estrada (NPC)
1998	Joseph Estrada (Note: Estrada stood under the banner of the multi-party electoral alliance LAMMP.)	39.86%	Joseph Estrada (PMP)	None (Note: Estrada's running mate was Edgardo Angara of the LAMMP–LDP.)		Gloria Macapagal Arroyo (Lakas–NUCD)
2004	None (Note: PMP endorsed Fernando Poe Jr. for president.)		Gloria Macapagal Arroyo (Lakas–CMD)	None (Note: PMP endorsed Loren Legarda for vice president.)		Noli de Castro (Independent)
2010	Joseph Estrada	26.25%	Benigno Aquino III (Liberal)	None (Note: Estrada's running mate was Jejomar Binay of PDP–Laban.)		Jejomar Binay (PDP–Laban)
2016	None (Note: PMP endorsed Grace Poe for president.)		Rodrigo Duterte (PDP–Laban)	None (Note: PMP endorsed Bongbong Marcos for vice president.)		Leni Robredo (Liberal)
2022	None (Note: PMP endorsed Bongbong Marcos for president.)		Bongbong Marcos (Partido Federal)	None (Note: PMP Endorsed Sara Duterte for vice president.)		Sara Z. Duterte (Lakas–CMD)

=== Legislative elections ===
Congress of the Philippines
Year	Seats won	Result	Year	Seats won	Ticket	Result
1992	Not participating	LDP plurality	1992	0 / 24	Single party ticket	LDP win 16/24 seats
1995	1 / 204	Lakas–Laban majority	1995	Not participating		Lakas–Laban win 9/12 seats
1998 (Note: Contested in an electoral alliance with LDP and NPC as LAMMP. Seat total consists of 55 LAMMP representatives. No PMP representatives were elected outside the LAMMP alliance.)	55 / 258	Lakas plurality	1998	1 / 24	LAMMP	LAMMP win 7/12 seats
2001	2 / 256	Lakas plurality	2001	Not participating		People Power Coalition win 8/13 seats
2004	5 / 261	Lakas plurality	2004	3 / 12	KNP	K4 win 7/12 seats
2007	4 / 270	Lakas plurality	2007	Not participating		Genuine Opposition win 8/12 seats
2010	4 / 286	Lakas plurality	2010	2 / 12	Single party ticket	Liberal win 4/12 seats
2013	0 / 292	Liberal plurality	2013	Not participating		Team PNoy win 9/12 seats
2016	0 / 297	Liberal plurality	2016	0 / 12	Single party ticket	Daang Matuwid win 7/12 seats
2019	1 / 304	PDP–Laban plurality	2019	0 / 12	Split ticket	Hugpong win 9/12 seats
2022	0 / 316	PDP–Laban plurality	2022	1 / 12	UniTeam	UniTeam alliance win 6/12 seats
2025	2 / 317	Lakas plurality	2025	Not participating		Bagong Pilipinas win 6/12 seats

== See also ==
- Nationalist People's Coalition
- Laban ng Demokratikong Pilipino
- Partido Demokratiko Pilipino
- United Nationalist Alliance
