= Second EDSA Revolution =

2001 revolution that overthrew Joseph Estrada in the Philippines

- Date: January 17–20, 2001 (3 days)
- Location: Philippines, primarily EDSA, Metro Manila
- Caused by: Breakdown in negotiations during the impeachment trial of President Joseph Estrada that began in December 2000
- Goals: Removal of Joseph Estrada as President
- Methods: Demonstrations, defections
- Result: Opposition victory: Estrada and his family leaves Malacañang Palace; Resignation of President Joseph Estrada; Gloria Macapagal Arroyo becomes President

Parties
Opposition; Military defectors: Armed Forces of the Philippines; Philippine National Police; Others: Anti-Estrada civilian protesters; Religious groups: Archdiocese of Manila; CBCP; Couples for Christ; Militant groups: Estrada Resign Movement; SANLAKAS; Akbayan Citizens Action Party; Bagong Alyansang Makabayan; Kongreso ng Mamayang Pilipino II; Individual groups: Makati Business Club	Government; Government parties: Pwersa ng Masang Pilipino; Lapian ng Masang Pilipino; Others: Pro-Estrada civilian supporters; People's Movement Against Poverty; Labor Reform Bloc; Religious groups: Iglesia ni Cristo; El Shaddai; Military loyalists: Presidential Security Group

Lead figures
Gloria Macapagal (Vice President) Others: Teofisto Guingona Jr.; Orly Mercado; Angelo Reyes; Panfilo Lacson; Corazon Aquino; Fidel Ramos; Jaime Sin; Joey Lina; Teodoro Casiño; Raymond Palatino; Gari Lazaro	Joseph Estrada (President) Others: Loi Estrada; Jinggoy Estrada; Miriam Defensor Santiago; Imelda Marcos; Juan Ponce Enrile; Eraño Manalo; Mike Velarde; Ronald Lumbao; Roberto Oca

Number
100,000 — close to 2 million protesters	6,000 - 150,000 protesters

The Second EDSA Revolution (Filipino: Ikalawang Rebolusyon sa EDSA), also known as the Second People Power Revolution, EDSA 2001, or EDSA II (pronounced EDSA Two or EDSA Dos, the Spanish and Filipino slang word for "two"), was a political protest from January 17–20, 2001 which peacefully overthrew the government of Joseph Estrada, the thirteenth president of the Philippines. Following allegations of corruption against Estrada and his subsequent investigation by Congress, impeachment proceedings against the president were opened on January 16. The decision by several senators not to examine a letter which would purportedly prove Estrada's guilt sparked large protests at the EDSA Shrine in Metro Manila, and calls for Estrada's resignation intensified in the following days, with the Armed Forces withdrawing their support for the president on January 19. On January 20 Estrada left office without formally resigning and fled Malacañang Palace with his family. He was succeeded by Vice President Gloria Macapagal Arroyo, who had been sworn into the presidency by Chief Justice Hilario Davide Jr. several hours earlier.

== Name ==
EDSA is an acronym derived from Epifanio de los Santos Avenue, the major thoroughfare connecting six cities in Metro Manila, namely Pasay, Makati, Mandaluyong, San Juan, Quezon City and Caloocan. The revolution's epicenter was the EDSA Shrine church at the northern tip of the Ortigas Center business district.

== Background ==
On October 4, 2000, Ilocos Sur Governor Chavit Singson, a longtime friend of President Joseph Estrada, went public with accusations that Estrada and his friends and family had received millions of pesos from operations of jueteng, a numbers game which is illegal in the Philippines.

The exposé immediately ignited reactions of rage. The next day, Senate Minority Leader Teofisto Guingona, Jr. delivered a fiery privilege speech accusing Estrada of receiving ₱220 million in jueteng money from Governor Singson from November 1998 to August 2000, as well as taking ₱70 million-worth of excise tax money from cigarettes intended for Ilocos Sur. He also allegedly received ₱130 million in kickbacks released by then budget secretary Benjamin Diokno for tobacco farmers, while his wife Loi Ejercito's foundation allegedly received ₱100 million "to the detriment of regular beneficiaries." Estrada was also accused of misusing 52 smuggled luxury vehicles, nepotism, and he allegedly hid assets and bought mansions for his mistresses. The privilege speech was referred by Senate President Franklin Drilon, to the Senate Blue Ribbon Committee and the Philippine House Committee on Justice for joint investigation. Another committee in the House of Representatives decided to investigate the exposé, while other House members spearheaded a move to impeach the president. On October 20, 2000, an early anti-Estrada rally was allegedly held in Naga City, led by former mayor Jesse Robredo, Mayor Sulpicio Roco Jr., and Ateneo de Naga president Joel Tabora who demanded the resignation of President Estrada.

More calls for resignation came from Manila Cardinal Archbishop Jaime Sin, the Catholic Bishops Conference of the Philippines, former Presidents Corazon Aquino and Fidel Ramos, and Vice President Gloria Macapagal Arroyo (who had resigned her cabinet position of Secretary of the Department of Social Welfare and Development). Cardinal Sin's statement read, "In the light of the scandals that besmirched the image of presidency, in the last two years, we stand by our conviction that he has lost the moral authority to govern." More resignations came from Estrada's cabinet and economic advisers, and other members of congress defected from his ruling party. Congressman Rene Magtubo of the partylist Sanlakas called for the resignation of both Estrada and Arroyo, the latter for the vice president to show solidarity with the opposition and join demonstrations; his call was criticized by activist and Bayan secretary general Teodoro Casiño as seeking to "drive a wedge in the united front against Estrada."

On November 13, 2000, the House of Representatives led by Speaker Manuel Villar transmitted the Articles of Impeachment, signed by 115 representatives, to the Senate. This caused shakeups in the leadership of both houses of congress. The impeachment trial was formally opened on November 20, with twenty-one senators taking their oaths as judges, and Supreme Court Chief Justice Hilario Davide, Jr. presiding. The trial began on December 7.

The day-to-day trial was covered on live television and received the highest viewing rating, mostly by the broadcasting giant ABS-CBN at the time. Among the highlights of the trial was the testimony of Clarissa Ocampo, senior vice president of Equitable PCI Bank, who testified that she was one foot away from Estrada when he signed the name "Jose Velarde" on documents involving a ₱500 million investment agreement with their bank in February 2000.

== Timeline ==
=== Impeachment trial ===
On January 16, 2001, the impeachment trial of President Estrada moved to the investigation of an envelope containing crucial evidence that would allegedly prove acts of political corruption by Estrada. Senators allied with Estrada moved to block the evidence. The conflict between the senator-judges and the prosecution became deeper, but then-Senate Majority Floor Leader Francisco Tatad requested that the impeachment court have a vote on opening the second envelope. The vote resulted in 10 senators in favor of examining the evidence, and 11 senators in favor of suppressing it. The list of senators who voted for the second envelope are as follows:

Tally of votes on the motion to examine the envelope
Voted yes	Voted no	Did not vote	Vacant	Total
10	11	1	2 (Note: Senator Marcelo Fernan died on July 11, 1999 and the seat of Senator Gloria Macapagal Arroyo was left vacant upon her election as Vice President.)	24

Senator	Party	Voted to examine?
Tessie Aquino-Oreta	LDP	No
Robert Barbers	Lakas	Did not vote
Rodolfo Biazon	LDP	Yes
Rene Cayetano	Lakas	Yes
Nikki Coseteng	NPC	No
Miriam Defensor Santiago	PRP	No
Franklin Drilon	LAMMP	Yes
Teofisto Guingona Jr.	Lakas	Yes
Juan Flavier	Lakas	Yes
Gregorio Honasan	Independent	No
Robert Jaworski	LAMMP	No
Loren Legarda	Lakas	Yes
Ramon Magsaysay Jr.	LAMMP	Yes
Blas Ople	LDP	No
John Henry Osmeña	LDP	No
Serge Osmeña	Liberal	Yes
Nene Pimentel	PDP–Laban	Yes
Juan Ponce Enrile	Independent	No
Ramon Revilla Sr.	LAMMP	No
Raul Roco	Aksyon	Yes
Tito Sotto	LDP	No
Francisco Tatad	Gabay Bayan	No

After the vote, Senator Nene Pimentel resigned as Senate President and walked out of the impeachment proceedings together with the nine opposition senators and 11 prosecutors in the Estrada impeachment trial. The 11 administration senators who voted to block the opening of the second envelope remained in the Senate session hall together with members of the defense panel. The phrase "Joe's Cohorts" quickly surfaced as a mnemonic device for remembering their names (Joe's Cohorts: Jaworski, Oreta, Enrile, Santiago, Coseteng, Osmeña, Honasan, Ople, Revilla, Tatad, Sotto). On February 14, 2001, at the initiative of Pimentel, the second envelope was opened before the local and foreign media. It contained the document that stated that businessman Jaime Dichaves and not Estrada owned the "Jose Velarde" account.

=== Day 1: January 17, 2001 ===
Senator Tessie Aquino-Oreta, one of eleven senators who voted against opening the envelope, was seen on national television as the opposition walked out; it was assumed that she was booing back and jigging at the crowd in the Senate gallery after the Ayala group jeered her and other pro-Erap senators. This further fueled the growing anti-Erap sentiments of the crowd gathered at EDSA Shrine, and she became the most vilified of the 11 senators. She was labeled a "prostitute" and a "concubine" of Estrada for her dancing act, while Senator Defensor-Santiago was also ridiculed by the crowd who branded her a "lunatic".

As he did in the first EDSA protest, Cardinal Jaime Sin called on the people to join the rally at the shrine. During the night, people began to gather in large numbers around the shrine, including protesters who received free transportation from nearby provinces such as Pampanga and Bulacan. Similar anti-Estrada rallies took place in regional centers nationwide, including Baguio, Naga, Iloilo City, and Davao.

=== Day 2: January 18, 2001 ===
The crowd continued to grow, bolstered by students from private schools and left-wing organizations. Activists from Bagong Alyansang Makabayan, Sanlakas, and Akbayan as well as lawyers of the Integrated Bar of the Philippines and other bar associations joined the thousands of protesters. A 10-kilometer human chain was formed from the Ninoy Aquino statue in Ayala Avenue, Makati to the EDSA Shrine as a demand for Estrada's resignation. At the shrine area, just as in 1986, stars and icons from the music industry entertained the crowds.

=== Day 3: January 19, 2001 ===
The Philippine National Police and the Armed Forces of the Philippines withdrew their support for Estrada, joining the crowds at the EDSA Shrine.

At 2:00 PM, Joseph Estrada appeared on television for the first time since the beginning of the protests and maintained that he would not resign. He said he wanted the impeachment trial to continue, stressing that only a guilty verdict would remove him from office.

At 6:15 PM, Estrada again appeared on television, calling for a snap presidential election to be held concurrently with congressional and local elections on May 14, 2001. He added that he would not run in this election.

=== Day 4: January 20, 2001 ===
Oath Taking of then Vice President Gloria Macapagal Arroyo as 14th President of the Philippines

At 12:30 in the afternoon, Gloria Macapagal-Arroyo took her oath of office as president before Chief Justice Hilario Davide Jr. in the presence of the crowd at EDSA. At the same time, however, a large anti-Estrada crowd had already gathered at the historic Mendiola Bridge, having left the shrine earlier in the day, only to face PNP personnel and the pro-Estrada supporters behind them, who had by now already attacked both the police and the anti-Estrada protesters and heckling them and even members of the press.

At 2:00 PM, Estrada released a letter saying he had "strong and serious doubts about the legality and constitutionality of her proclamation as president". In that same letter, however, he said he would give up his office to allow for national reconciliation.

Later, Estrada and his family evacuated Malacañang Palace on a boat along the Pasig River. They were smiling and waving to reporters, shaking hands with the remaining Cabinet members and palace employees. He was initially placed under house arrest in San Juan but was later transferred to his rest home in Sampaloc, a small village in Tanay, Rizal.

== Aftermath ==
On the last day of protests on EDSA on January 20, 2001, Estrada left his office as president without issuing a formal resignation. Vice President Gloria Macapagal Arroyo was thus sworn into office by Supreme Court Chief Justice Hilario G. Davide Jr. Among those who opposed Arroyo's succession of Estrada as president was Senator Miriam Defensor Santiago, who vehemently argued that Arroyo's administration was illegitimate under the constitution due to the lack of a formal resignation from president Estrada.

On March 2, 2001, the Supreme Court upheld the constitutionality of Estrada's ouster based on his implied resignation in a unanimous 13-0 decision in Estrada vs. Desierto.

In the days after Estrada and his son Jinggoy were arrested for plunder in their home on April 25, 2001, several rallies were held along EDSA by his supporters and congressional allies calling for both his release and the removal of Arroyo as president, culminating in the rallyists heading to Malacañang on May 1 and attempting to storm the government premises.

On September 12, 2007, Estrada was found guilty of plunder beyond reasonable doubt by the Philippine anti-graft court and sentenced to life imprisonment. He was pardoned by Macapagal-Arroyo on October 25, 2007.

== Reactions ==
=== International ===
International reaction to the administration change was mixed. While some foreign nations, including the United States, immediately recognized the legitimacy of Arroyo's presidency, foreign commentators described the revolt as "a defeat for due process of law", "mob rule", and a "de facto coup". The only means of legitimizing the event was the last-minute Supreme Court ruling that "the welfare of the people is the supreme law." But by then, the Armed Forces of the Philippines had already withdrawn support for the president, which some analysts called unconstitutional, a view shared by many foreign political analysts. William Overholt, a Hong Kong-based political economist, said that "It is either being called mob rule or mob rule as a cover for a well-planned coup, but either way, it's not democracy."

=== Domestic ===
Opinion was divided during EDSA II about whether Gloria Macapagal Arroyo as the incumbent vice president should be president if Joseph Estrada was ousted; many groups who participated in EDSA II expressly stated that they did not want Arroyo for president either, and some of these groups would later participate in EDSA III. The prevailing Constitution of the Philippines calls for the Vice President of the Philippines, Arroyo at the time, to act as interim president only when the sitting president dies, resigns, or becomes incapacitated. Estrada had resigned from office and the constitutionality of his resignation was upheld by the Supreme Court on March 2, 2001.

After Estrada's plunder conviction and subsequent pardon, on January 18, 2008, Estrada's Pwersa ng Masang Pilipino (PMP) bought full-page advertisements in Metro Manila newspapers, blaming EDSA 2 for having "inflicted a dent on Philippine democracy". It featured clippings that questioned the constitutionality of the revolution. The published featured clippings were taken from Time, The New York Times, The Straits Times, The Los Angeles Times, The Washington Post, Asia Times Online, The Economist, and International Herald Tribune. Former Supreme Court justice Cecilia Muñoz Palma opined that EDSA 2 violated the 1987 Constitution.

In February 2008, several parts of the Catholic Church, which played a vital role during EDSA II, issued an apology of sorts. The sitting Catholic Bishops' Conference of the Philippines (CBCP) president, Iloilo Archbishop Angel Lagdameo, expressed disappointment in Arroyo's presidency and called EDSA II a mistake.

=== By Estrada ===
On March 13, 2008, Estrada named Lucio Tan, Jaime Sin, Fidel Ramos, Chavit Singson, and the Ayala and Lopez clans (who were both involved in water businesses) as co-conspirators of the EDSA Revolution of 2001.

In October 2016, Estrada claimed without evidence that it was the U.S. that ousted him from office.

== See also ==
- People Power Revolution - a similar event in the Philippines that ousted dictator Ferdinand Marcos
- 2001 Philippine general election
- People Power Coalition
