= Puwersa ng Masa =

Defunct Philippine political alliance in 2001

- Abbreviation: PnM
- Leader: Loi Ejercito
- Senate leader: Edgardo Angara
- Campaign manager: Tito Sotto
- Spokesperson: Juanito Remulla
- Founded: 2001
- Dissolved: 2001
- Preceded by: Laban ng Makabayang Masang Pilipino
- Succeeded by: Koalisyon ng Nagkakaisang Pilipino
- Coalition members: PMP; LDP; PRP
- Colors: Orange, Blue

Puwersa ng Masa (PnM, Force of the Masses, also known as LDP–Pwersa ng Masa) was the Philippine opposition's political multi-party electoral alliance in the May 14, 2001, midterm Legislative elections. The coalition was created after the EDSA Revolution of 2001 that ousted Joseph Estrada from the presidency on January 20.

The coalition was led by former First Lady Loi Estrada who successfully ran for a Senate seat. The coalition featured candidates from the Laban ng Demokratikong Pilipino and the Partido ng Masang Pilipino, and Miriam Defensor Santiago's People's Reform Party, as well as independent candidates.

== Platforms ==
Puwersa campaigned that the senators should be elected by region, as said by Ed Angara and Juan Ponce Enrile.

While campaigning in March, Puwersa advocated for women and children's rights via legislation.

In April, its candidate from Mindanao Ombra Tamano advocated for Christian-Muslim unity and lasting peace in Mindanao, and being against secessionist groups, and for federalism that can solve the island's long standing problem. He also campaign for the country's shift to parliamentary government.

After the loss of Tamano, he said that the loss of a candidate for Senate from Mindanao make the island underrepresented in the upper legislative chamber.

== Harassment ==
=== Media ===
Senatorial candidates Dong Puno and Ed Angara received harassment from anti-Estrada media.

=== Attack ads ===
People Power Coalition's (PPC) 13-0 movement bombed the television with ads attacking each candidates of Puwersa ng Masa. Later, it was pulled out because of complaint by a foreign media respondent. The respondent said that the 13-0 movement did not gained their permission to use their media in the attack ads. Later, PPC used flyers and posters to promote the ads. Also, Puwersa camp filed charges against PPC camp.

=== Arrest ===
In May, days before election day, Senator Enrile, one of its candidates is arrested for rebellion charges. While former PNP Chief Panfilo Lacson facing his pending case, and Gregorio "Gringo" Honasan is hiding due to filed charges against him.

== The senatorial slate ==
Name	Party	Occupation	Elected
Edgardo Angara	LDP	Former Executive Secretary, former Senator and 1998 LAMMP vice presidential nominee (lost to Gloria Macapagal Arroyo)	Yes
Reuben Canoy	LDP	Former mayor of Cagayan de Oro	No
Noli de Castro	Independent	Journalist and TV and radio personality	Yes
Miriam Defensor Santiago	PRP	Senator, 1992 and 1998 PRP presidential nominee (lost to Fidel V. Ramos and Joseph Estrada respectively)	No
Juan Ponce Enrile	LDP	Senator and 1998 independent presidential candidate (lost to Joseph Estrada), former Defense Secretary	No
Loi Ejercito	Independent	Medical doctor and former First Lady of the Philippines	Yes
Gregorio Honasan	Independent	Senator, former Army officer	No
Panfilo Lacson	LDP	Former Chief of the Philippine National Police	Yes
Jamby Madrigal	LDP	Former Presidential Adviser on Children's Affairs and Undersecretary of Social Welfare and Development	No
Orly Mercado	Independent	Former Secretary of National Defense and former Senator	No
Dong Puno	LDP	Lawyer, journalist, TV and radio personality and former Press Secretary and government spokesman	No
Nina Rasul	Independent	Former Senator	No
Ombra Tamano	LDP	Medical doctor	No

== Election results ==
Four out of 13 candidates won the possible 13 seats in the Senate. These are, in order of votes received:

- Edgardo Angara
- Noli de Castro
- Loi Ejercito
- Panfilo Lacson

The other candidate was only elected to serve the remaining unexpired term of Tito Guingona.

- Gregorio Honasan

== Criticism ==
=== Namesake ===
Mail.com reader Joe dela Cruz says of the senatorial ticket put together by Estrada should be called as Perwisyo ng Masa, (Nuisance of the Masses).

=== Jump in a plane challenge ===
After the arrest of Estrada in April, Defensor Santiago challenged critics that she would jump off from a plane without a parachute if Estrada is arrested for plunder. PPC allies such as Akbayan and KOMPIL II, berated her statement, and challenged her to fulfill the challenge, and the other one like being gunned down if 13-0 is achieved.

=== Lack of finances ===
Lakas of PPC berated the opposition coalition for not having enough cash, but Pwersa berated the former for having 'trapo tactics'.

== See also ==
- People Power Coalition, Puwersa ng Masa's rival coalition
- Laban ng Makabayang Masang Pilipino, the predecessor coalition of Puwersa ng Masa
- Koalisyon ng Nagkakaisang Pilipino, the successor coalition of Puwersa ng Masa
