= People's Reform Party =

Reformist political party founded by Miriam Defensor Santiago

- President: Narciso Santiago Jr.
- Secretary-General: Ariel Nepomuceno
- Spokesperson: Narciso D. Santiago III
- Founder: Miriam Defensor Santiago
- Founded: April 12, 1991
- Headquarters: Quezon City
- Youth wing: Force of Reform
- Ideology: Reformism
- Political position: Center-left
- National affiliation: UniTeam (2021–2024); HNP (2018–2021); K4 (2004); Puwersa ng Masa (2001); NPC (1995)
- Colors: Red; Light red (customary)
- Senate: 0 / 24
- House of Representatives: 0 / 317
- Provincial Governors: 0 / 82
- Provincial Vice Governors: 0 / 82

Website
- www.miriam.com.ph fb/People's Reform Party

The People's Reform Party (PRP) is a political party in the Philippines. Founded on April 12, 1991, as the political party of former Agrarian Reform Secretary Miriam Defensor Santiago for her bid as president in the 1992 presidential elections.

During the 1992 Elections, the party nominated Santiago as president and Ramon "Jun" Magsaysay, Jr. as vice president, however both Santiago and Magsaysay lost the elections to former Defense Secretary Fidel Ramos and then-Senator Joseph Estrada, respectively. The Force of Reform Philippines (FORPH) serves as the official youth-wing of the People's Reform Party. While under the same Miriam Defensor Santiago wing, the Youth Reform Movement is not related to the PRP. Since the death of Miriam Defensor-Santiago in 2016, the party has spiraled down under the management of Miriam's widow, Narciso Jr., who largely began supporting Duterte groups.

In 2021, the party's old vanguards and pro-Miriam supporters left in protest against Narciso Jr.'s political positions that favored the Duterte political dynasty, effectively gutting the party into a Duterte puppet organization. The party, under Narciso Jr., continued to back Duterte-associated politicians again in 2025 when former president Rodrigo Duterte was charged with crimes against humanity by the International Criminal Court.

== History ==
=== Formation and 1992 elections: Kay Miriam Kami! ===
On April 12, 1991, the party was founded by former Immigration Commissioner and Agrarian Reform Secretary Miriam Defensor Santiago. As Santiago being known for cleaning the immigration bureau against corruption, she is then being considered as preferred presidential candidate to win. In the party convention for the 1992 elections, she berated her opponents who throwing black propaganda (like of nicknaming her Brenda for brain damage due to her rants), and belittlement on her, with choosing former Congressman and Ramon Magsaysay's son Jun. Also, tandem of former NBI director Alfredo Lim and former Housing Agency administrator Lito Atienza joined PRP for their 1992 elections in Manila for its mayoral and vice mayoral positions.

Our task is to reform the culture of corruption. In this archipelago, the land of our birth, the cradle of our hopes and dreams, we find it intolerable and immoral that of 62 million Filipinos, 2/3 are living at the poverty line. We find it unacceptable that despite our great wealth in natural resources, despite our gifts in human resources, our country today bears the onus of a negative reputation as one of the most corrupt governments in Southeast Asia.

— Miriam Defensor Santiago

Her campaign was known for gathering the vote of the youth, with campaigning and speaking in the universities, with presenting herself as the reformist one. At first, she gathered at least 40% to 50% survey ratings, but in those times where the election day is near, she have a tight race with Lakas nominee and former Defense Secretary Fidel Ramos, who have been endorsed by then-incumbent President Corazon Aquino.

In the first days of counting votes, Santiago leading the race, with being the topnotcher in all cities and municipalities in Metro Manila. But after incident of power outages, Ramos lead the counting, and eventually won the elections. Santiago used that incident as an evidence for filing an electoral protest. Various media personnel became witnesses to the fraud made in the election, where the phrase, 'Miriam won in the election, but lost in the counting' became popular. However, her protest was eventually dismissed by the Supreme Court. But in local elections, Lim and Atienza secured their victory in Manila.

=== 1995 elections: Drafting with NPC ===
For the 1995 Senate elections, Santiago joined the opposition Nationalist People's Coalition (NPC) led by then-Senate President Ernesto Maceda. Santiago snatched victory, placing 6th. In the local elections, Lim and Atienza together with some city council candidates who joined PRP won the elections in Manila.

=== 1998 elections: Running again for presidency ===
In 1998 elections, Santiago launched her second run for presidency, with selection of Kit Tatad as her running-mate, but both of them lost to then-popular Vice President Joseph Estrada and Senator Gloria Arroyo.

=== 2001 elections: Pwersa ng Masa ===
For the 2001 Senate election, Santiago and PRP joined the opposition and Pro-Estrada Pwersa ng Masa. After the arrest of Estrada in April, she challenged critics that she would jump off from a plane without a parachute if Estrada is arrested for plunder. People Power Coalition's (PPC) left-wing partners such as Akbayan and KOMPIL II, blasted the statement, and challenged her to fulfill the challenge, and the other one like being gunned down if 13-0 is achieved, and berated PPC's acronym as Puro Palpak Coalition. Even though got the endorsement of a religious sect, she lost the election 15th.

=== 2004 elections: Joining K-4 ===
In 2004 elections, Santiago and the PRP joined President Arroyo's K-4 coalition, and successfully got a senate seat placing 7th.

=== 2010 elections: Coalition with Nacionalista ===
For the 2010 elections, Miriam supported Nacionalista Senator Manny Villar's presidential candidacy, and joined his slate as a guest candidate. PRP also a guest coalition member of Lakas–Kampi and Pwersa ng Masang Pilipino on the senatorial election. She won placing 3rd. She did not vote for Senate presidency election between her former Pwersa ng Masa colleague Juan Ponce Enrile and Nacionalista Alan Peter Cayetano.

Also, her nephew Mike Defensor ran under PRP banner in the Quezon City mayoralty race but lost the polls. Arthur Defensor, Sr. ran for the governorship of Iloilo and won the polls, who also caucuses with the Nacionalista and Lakas–Kampi.

=== 2016 elections: Si Miriam ang Sagot ===
On October 13, 2015, Senator Miriam Defensor Santiago announced her intention to run for president in the 2016 elections. She also announced she picked her Senate colleague Bongbong Marcos as her running mate for vice president. Some people criticized the move, as when Santiago is still a RTC judge, she berated her running-mate's father before about human rights abuses and bailed some activists like movie director Lino Brocka. Both Defensor and Marcos lost the election.

=== Miriam Defensor Santiago's death and 2019 elections ===
Santiago died September 29, 2016, at St. Luke's Medical Center in Taguig from lung cancer. After which, Santiago's widow, Narciso Jr., tried to manage the party, although no member sittting in government constituted the party by that time. To the surprise of many, the party under Narciso Jr. nominated Harry Roque as candidate for the Philippine Senate, despite Roque being unsupportive of Miriam Defensor-Santiago's presidential runs when she was still alive. It was later made public that Roque's nomination was arranged through the auspices of Davao City mayor Sara Duterte, daughter of then-President Rodrigo Duterte. The nomination of Roque sparked wide criticism, garnering massive backlash notably from stern supporters of the late senator and PRP founder Santiago. Various organizations called Roque a 'user' and was 'destroying the image' of PRP and the late Santiago. Additionally, Roque's already low public appeal degraded further from 8.7% in March 2018 into 8% in October 2018.

=== 2022 elections ===
The PRP, still under Narciso Jr., announced support for Sara Duterte's potential presidential run and renewed their ties with the Hugpong ng Pagbabago (HNP) for the 2022 elections. Former Lakas presidential nominee Gilbert Teodoro and Roque are tapped in to be their senatorial candidates. All party members loyal to the late party founder, Miriam Defensor-Santiago, left the party after Narciso Jr's political decision to support Sara Duterte in the 2022 presidential elections. The original members, as well as Miriam's supporters vocally disowned the party's decision and left the party, leaving the party under the management of a few pro-Duterte newbies in the aftermath, effectively gutting the organization as a Duterte puppet party.

=== 2025 elections ===
For the 2025 elections, PRP still under Narciso Santiago Jr. endorsed SAGIP Partylist congressman Rodante Marcoleta's senate campaign, who was also affiliated with the DuterTen candidates and the family of former president Rodrigo Duterte who was charged with crimes against humanity by the International Criminal Court, the institution that was widely supported by the late senator Miriam Defensor-Santiago.

== Electoral candidates ==
=== 1992 General Election ===
These are the following members who ran under the People's Reform Party for the following positions:

- Presidential Election
  - President: Miriam Defensor Santiago
  - Vice President: Ramon Magsaysay, Jr.
- Senatorial Election
  - Fortunato Abat
  - Cris Abasolo
  - Carlos Cajelo
  - Dominico Casas
  - Jose Cordova
  - Dante de Guzman
  - Renato Ecarma
  - Melchor Ines
  - Antonio Leviste
  - Abdullah Abe Madale
  - Jaime Muyargas
  - Antonio Policarpio
  - Mario Reyes
  - Blue Rivera
  - Efren Sumajit
  - Albert Umali
- Local Election: The following politicians won under the People's Reform Party during the 1992 general elections in the Philippines:
  - Manila
    - Mayor: Alfredo Lim
    - Vice Mayor: Lito Atienza
  - Baguio City
    - Mayor: Mauricio Domogan
  - Caloocan
    - Mayor: Rey Malonzo
    - Vice Mayor:
  - San Mateo, Rizal
    - Mayor: Jose Peping Diaz
    - Vice Mayor: Ike Rodriguez
    - Councilor: Rodolfo John Ortiz Teope

=== 1995 General Election ===
The following run under the banner of People's Reform Party in the 1995 election:

- Senatorial Election
1. Miriam Defensor Santiago (won, joined NPC coalition)
2. Herman Tiu Laurel (lost)
3. Brigido Simon (withdrew and slide to run for Mayor of Quezon City)
- Congressional Election
1. Reynaldo Calalay - First District, Quezon City
2. Leopoldo San Buenaventura - Camarines Sur
3. Narciso Monfort - Iloilo
4. Prospero Nograles - Davao City
5. Dabs Abdullah Mangotara - Lanao del Norte
- Board Members
- Albay
  - Andres Serrano
- Biliran
  - Romulo Bernardes
- Local Election
- Manila
  - Mayor: Alfredo Lim
  - Vice Mayor: Lito Atienza
  - Councilors:
1. Banzai Nieva
2. Berting Ocampo
3. Toting Cailian
4. Erning Dionisio
5. Nesto Ponce
6. Bert Basco
7. Marlon Lacson
8. Joe Lopez
9. Pete de Jesus
10. Nilo Roces
11. Vic Melendez
12. Rino Tolentino
13. Paz Herrera
14. Edward Maceda
15. Rudy Bacani
16. Joey Hizon
17. Felix Espiritu
18. Rogie dela Paz
19. Kim Atienza
20. Roger Gernale
21. Ging Logarta
22. Lou Veloso
23. Joy Dawis
24. Butch Belgica
- Catbalogan City
  - Mayor: Jess Redaja
- Padre Garcia, Batangas
  - Mayor: Victor Reyes
- Mandaluyong
  - Vice Mayor: Ernesto Domingo
- Biñan, Laguna
  - Vice Mayor: Alexis Desuasido
- Sta. Rosa, Laguna
  - Vice Mayor: Jose Catindig
- Baguio City
  - Councilors:
1. Elmo Nevada
2. Edilberto Claraval
3. Richard Carino
4. Rolando dela Cruz
5. Lilia Yaranon
- Bamban, Tarlac
  - Councilors:
1. Ricarte Rivera
- Norzagaray, Bulacan
  - Councilors:
1. Mario Villegas

=== 1998 General Election ===
Candidates

- Presidential Election
  - President: Miriam Defensor Santiago
  - Vice President: Francisco Tatad
- Senatorial Election

(none)

=== 2001 General Election ===
- Senatorial Election

The leader Miriam Defensor Santiago and her PRP joined the Puwersa ng Masa coalition of the opposition ticket under deposed President Joseph Estrada.

=== 2004 General Election ===
- Senatorial Election

The leader Miriam Defensor Santiago and her PRP joined the K-4 coalition of the administration ticket under Gloria Macapagal Arroyo.

=== 2010 General Election ===
- Senatorial Election

=== 2016 General Election ===
==== Candidates ====
- Presidential Election
  - President: Miriam Defensor Santiago (Lost)
  - Vice President: Bongbong Marcos (Lost)
- Senatorial Election
  - Greco Belgica (Lost)
  - Martin Romualdez (Lost)
  - Dionisio Santiago (Lost)
  - Francis Tolentino (Lost)
- Local Election - Pasay
  - City Councilor - District 2: Ramon Yabut (Lost)

=== 2019 General Election ===
The following run under the banner of People's Reform Party in the 2019 election:

- Congressional Election
1. Maricel Natividad-Nagaño - Fourth District, Nueva Ecija (won)

=== 2022 General Election ===
The following run under the Banner of PRP for 2022 elections:

- Senatorial Slate
1. Harry Roque - Former Presidential Spokesperson (Lost)
2. Gilberto Teodoro - Former Secretary of National Defense (Lost)

== Electoral performance ==
=== Presidential and vice presidential elections ===
Year	Presidential election			Vice presidential election		
Year	Candidate	Vote share	Result	Candidate	Vote share	Result
1992	Miriam Defensor Santiago	19.72%	Fidel Ramos (Lakas)	Ramon Magsaysay Jr.	14.20%	Joseph Estrada (NPC)
1998	Miriam Defensor Santiago	2.96%	Joseph Estrada (PMP)	Francisco Tatad	2.92%	Gloria Macapagal Arroyo (Lakas)
2004	None		Gloria Macapagal Arroyo (Lakas)	None		Noli de Castro (Independent)
2010	None		Benigno Aquino III (Liberal)	None		Jejomar Binay (PDP–Laban)
2016	Miriam Defensor Santiago	3.42%	Rodrigo Duterte (PDP–Laban)	None (Note: Santiago's running mate was Bongbong Marcos, a Nacionalista who stood as an independent candidate.)		Leni Robredo (Liberal)
2022	None		Bongbong Marcos (Partido Federal)	None (Note: PRP adopted Sara Duterte as their candidate for vice president.)		Sara Z. Duterte (Lakas)

=== Legislative elections ===
Congress of the Philippines
House of Representatives			Senate			
Year	Seats won	Result	Year	Seats won	Ticket	Result
1992	Did not participate	LDP plurality	1992	0 / 24	Single party ticket	LDP win 16/24 seats
1995	0 / 204	Lakas / Laban majority	1995	1 / 12	Split ticket	Lakas–Laban win 9/12 seats
1998	0 / 258	Lakas plurality	1998	Did not participate		LAMMP win 7/12 seats
2001	Did not participate	Lakas plurality	2001	0 / 13	Puwersa ng Masa	People Power win 8/13 seats
2004	Did not participate	Lakas plurality	2004	1 / 12	K4	K4 win 7/12 seats
2007	Did not participate	Lakas plurality	2007	Did not participate		GO win 8/12 seats
2010	Did not participate	Lakas plurality	2010	1 / 12	Nacionalista ticket	Liberal win 4/12 seats
2013	Did not participate	Liberal plurality	2013	Did not participate		Team PNoy win 9/12 seats
2016	Did not participate	Liberal plurality	2016	Did not participate		Daang Matuwid win 7/12 seats
2019	1 / 304	PDP–Laban plurality	2019	Did not participate		HNP win 9/12 seats
2022	3 / 316	PDP–Laban plurality	2022	0 / 12	UniTeam	UniTeam win 6/12 seats
2025	1 / 317	Lakas plurality	2025	Did not participate		Bagong Pilipinas win 6/12 seats

== Party leadership history ==
Party leader
Leader	Term start	Term end
Miriam Defensor Santiago	1991	2016
Party president
President	Term start	Term end
Narciso Santiago, Jr.	2016	present

== Notable party members ==
1. Sen. Miriam Defensor Santiago
2. Sec. Esperanza Cabral (DOH)
3. Mike Defensor
4. Arthur Defensor, Sr.
5. Harry Roque
6. Gilbert Teodoro
7. Oscar Albayalde
