= Ramon Magsaysay Jr. =

Filipino politician and businessman

The Honorable Ramon B. Magsaysay Jr.
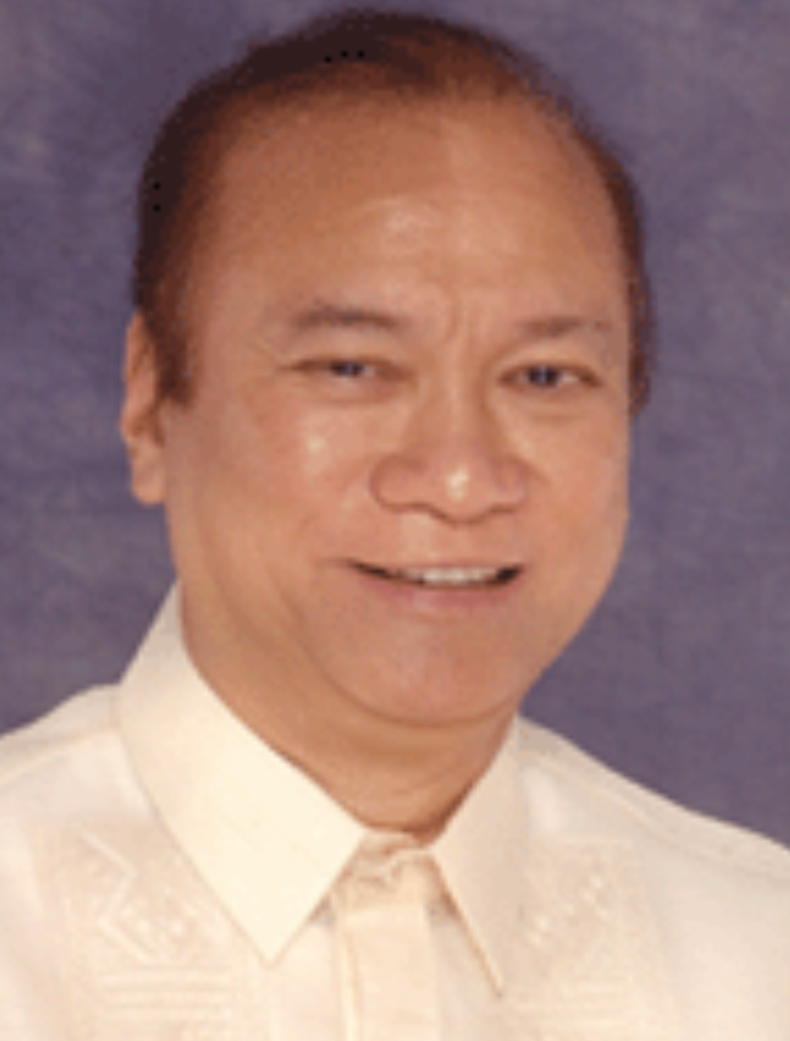
- Magsaysay in 2004

Senator of the Philippines
- In office June 30, 1995 – June 30, 2007

Member of the Philippine House of Representatives from Zambales
- In office December 30, 1965 – December 30, 1969
- Preceded by: Virgilio Afable
- Succeeded by: Antonio Diaz

Personal details
- Born: Ramon Banzon Magsaysay Jr. June 5, 1938 (age 88) Manila, Philippine Commonwealth
- Party: Liberal (1965–1992; 2005–present)
- Other political affiliations: Independent (2000–2001); LAMMP (1998–2000); Lakas (1995–1998, 2001–2005); PRP (1992–1995)
- Spouse(s): Isabel Delgado (m. 1964, annulled) Marie Louise Kahn
- Children: 2
- Parent(s): Ramon Magsaysay; Luz Banzon Magsaysay
- Education: De La Salle College (BS); Harvard University; New York University
- Occupation: Politician
- Profession: Businessman

Ramon Banzon Magsaysay Jr. (born June 5, 1938) is a Filipino politician and businessman. He is the son of former Philippine President Ramon Magsaysay.

== Early life and career ==
Magsaysay Jr. was born in Manila to Ramon Magsaysay and Luz Banzon. He is the youngest and the only son among the three children. He was 15 when his father was elected president and was 18 when his father died in a plane crash in Cebu. He attended De La Salle College, where he earned a degree in mechanical engineering. He pursued post-graduate studies in 1962 at Harvard School of Business Administration in Boston, Massachusetts, and spent another year in New York University Graduate School of Business Administration. In 1960, he worked as an engineer trainee at Procter & Gamble Philippines. From 1961 to 1962, he was a supervising engineer for operations for Caltex Philippines.

== Business career ==
After a productive four-year in Congress representing the lone district of Zambales, he returned to work in the private sector where he ventured into various industries including garment manufacturing and export, semi-conductor, and travel and tourism. Educated in business and engineering skills, Jun pioneered the cable television industry in the country. With over 550 cable operators nationwide at present, the cable TV business spawned a multi-billion broadband industry. In recognition of conceiving the blueprint for the sector, Magsaysay is accepted as The Father of Philippine Cable Television.

- 1969–1995 Reserve officer, Lt. Jr. Grade, Philippine Navy
- 1972–1995 Company president, Colorview CATV Inc.
- 1975–1995 Company president/chairman of the board, RMJ Development Corporation
- 1970–1975 Company vice president, Gelmart Industries Phils. Inc.
- 1978–1985 Company director, Labtech Manufacturing Industries Inc.
- 1988–1990 Business columnist, Philippine Daily Inquirer
- 1989–1995 Company president, Cable Communications Inc.,
- 1989–1995 Chairman of the board, Dynatravel Management Corp.
- 1991–1995 Company president, Country Communications Network Inc.
- 1994–1995 Chairman of the board, Asian Cable Communications Inc.
- 2011–2012 Chairman of the board, Legaspi Oil Corp. and co-chairman of the CIIF-Oil Mills Group

== Political career ==
=== House of Representatives (1965–1969) ===
In 1965, he was elected as a congressman for the lone district of Zambales. He was the youngest Congressman to be elected to the Lower House at the age of 27. He only served for one term and after stepping down in 1969, he went back to the private sector.

=== 1992 Vice-Presidential bid ===
In the 1992 elections, he accepted the offer by Agrarian Reform secretary Miriam Defensor Santiago to be her vice presidential candidate under the People's Reform Party. Running for the elections and hoping to follow his father's footsteps, he lost to actor Senator Joseph Estrada. He went back to the private sector soon after.

=== Senator of the Philippines (1995–2007) ===
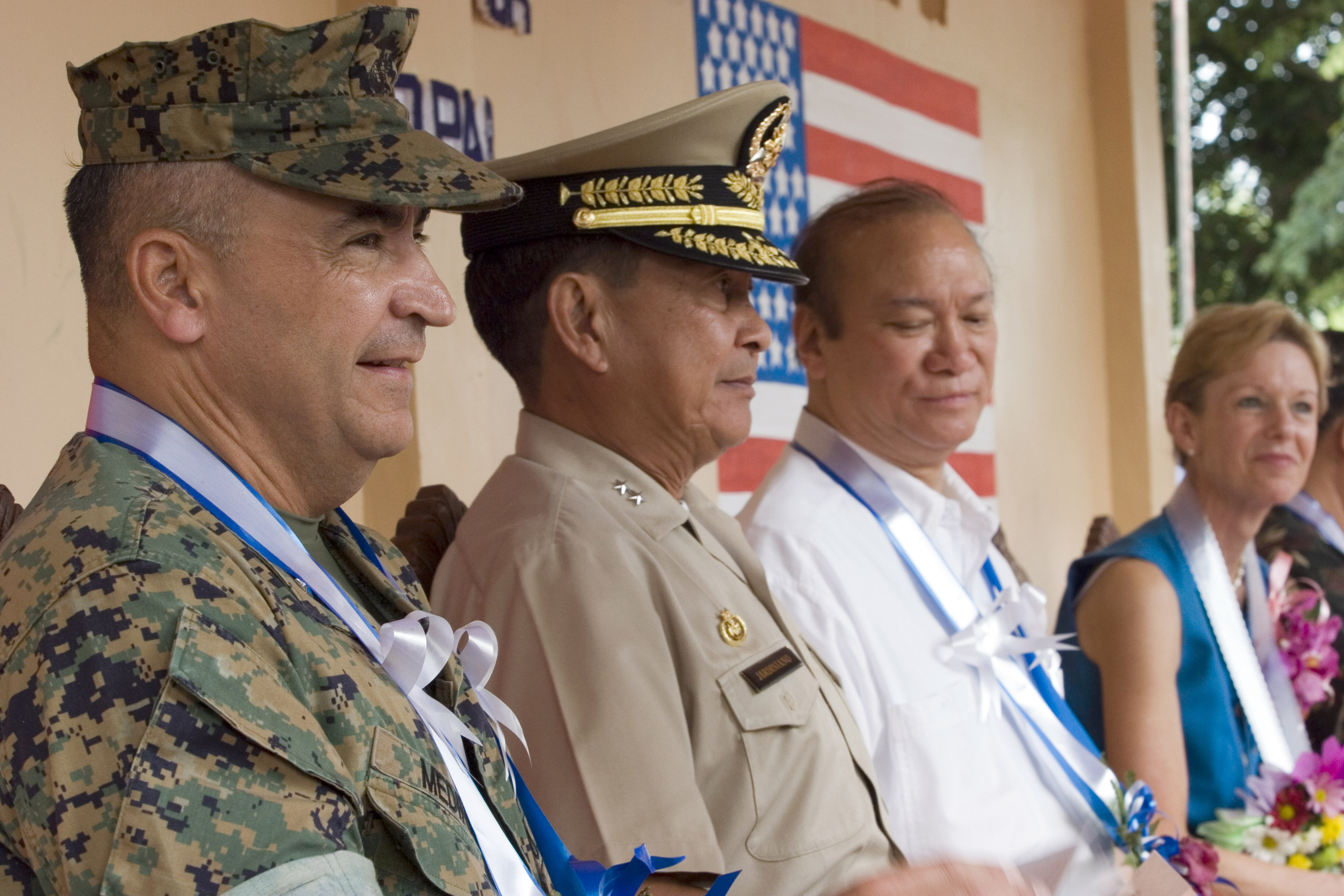
Senator Magsaysay attending a ceremony marking the completion of an engineering civil action project conducted by the United States and Philippine Armed Forces

In the 1995 elections, President Fidel Ramos invited Magsaysay to join the senatorial slate of the Lakas-Laban Coalition. He won the election and received the third highest vote among the twelve elected senators. In 1996, he was commissioned by the Senate to look for a suitable place to relocate the Senate offices. The building would be renovated as the National Museum would be expanding in time for the Philippine Centennial celebrations in 1998. The Senate session hall and offices found its new home at the GSIS Building in the Financial Center in Pasay City.

On January 16, 2001, Magsaysay voted in favor of opening the bank envelope containing evidence in the impeachment case of President Joseph Estrada. The request was overturned by a negative vote that led to the second EDSA People Power Revolution. In the 2001 elections, he was reelected to the senate under the Lakas and was affiliated with the People Power Coalition (PPC). In the electoral crisis involving President Gloria Macapagal Arroyo, Magsaysay distanced himself from the ruling party Lakas and returned to his former party the Liberal which then led by Senate President Franklin Drilon.

As a legislator, he has co-authored several laws including:

- Anti-Money Laundering Act of 2001 (RA 9160)
- Electronic Commerce Law (RA 8792)
- Ban on Hard Surfactants (RA 8970)
- Magna Carta for Small and Medium Enterprises (RA 8289)
- New Foreign Investments Act (RA 8179)
- Mechanical Engineering Law (RA 8495)
- Amending the Omnibus Investments Code – Regional Headquarters (RA 8756)
- Jewelry Manufacturing Act (RA 8502)

=== Senate comeback attempt ===
In 2013, Magsaysay ran for senator under Team PNoy, the administration coalition. He also received an endorsement from Makabayan on May 5, 2013. However, he was unsuccessful, placing 16th, thus outside the Magic 12.

== Personal life ==
Jun, as many people call him, is married to Marie Louise (Marilou) Kahn, and they have no children. However, he had two children from his first marriage with Isabel Delgado (m. October 1964), Margarita and Francisco (Paco), an entrepreneur.
