= Laban ng Makabayang Masang Pilipino =

Philippine political alliance in 1998 led by Joseph Estrada

- Abbreviation: LAMMP
- Leader: Joseph Estrada
- Deputy leader: Edgardo Angara
- Senate leader: Marcelo Fernan
- House leader: Manny Villar
- Founder: Joseph Estrada
- Founded: 1997
- Dissolved: 2001
- Preceded by: Nationalist People's Coalition; Lakas–Laban (Laban/LDP faction)
- Succeeded by: Puwersa ng Masa
- Headquarters: Pasay City
- Ideology: Populism
- Political position: Centre to centre-left
- Coalition members: PMP; LDP; NPC; PDP–Laban
- Colors: Orange, Blue

The Laban ng Makabayang Masang Pilipino (LAMMP; lit. 'Struggle of the Patriotic Filipino Masses') was the umbrella political opposition coalition during the 1998 Philippine general election that led to the election of then Vice President Joseph Estrada as President of the Philippines. It was the largest political party during that time, uniting the major Philippine political parties which included Laban ng Demokratikong Pilipino, Nationalist People's Coalition and Partido ng Masang Pilipino, along with minor and regional parties.

Estrada won the presidential election against then-House Speaker Jose de Venecia Jr.. Meanwhile, Estrada's running mate Edgardo Angara lost to fellow senator Gloria Macapagal Arroyo of Lakas–NUCD–UMDP.

Shortly after the 1998 elections, the party's name was changed into Lapian ng Masang Pilipino (Organization of the Filipino Masses), as the "struggle" ended with Estrada's victory.

== Post-1998 elections ==
After Estrada seized victory, many Lakas candidates secretly supported him jumped into LAMP, including Lakas Senators Ramon Revilla, Franklin Drilon, and Jun Magsaysay. It also includes former Lakas congressmen such as Las Piñas' Manny Villar, who have been serving as coalition's leader in the House of Representatives, and become its Speaker.

In 2000, House Speaker Villar left LAMMP before presiding over Estrada's Impeachment. He was then ousted as speaker by pro-Estrada congressmen and was replaced with Camarines Sur representative Arnulfo Fuentebella. During this time, Senators Revilla, Drilon, Magsaysay, Biazon, Coseteng, and Jaworski left the coalition.

== Slogan ==
The coalition devised an acronym for the Senate slate which is: TPW (The Pilipino Win/The Philippine Way), JOBS and LABOR. T stands for Torres; P for Pimentel; W for Webb; J for Jaworski; O for Ople; B for Bagatsing; S for Sotto; L for Lagman; A for Aquino-Oreta; B for Biazon; O for Osmeña; R for Romero.

== Senatorial slate ==
Below is the official senatorial slate of LAMMP for the 1998 Philippine senatorial election.

Name	Party	Occupation
Tessie Aquino-Oreta	LDP	Representative from Malabon-Navotas
Ramon Bagatsing Jr.	LDP	Representative from Manila's 4th congressional district
Rodolfo Biazon	LDP	Marine Corps officer and Senator
Robert Jaworski	PMP	Professional basketball player
Edcel Lagman	LDP	Representative from Albay's 1st congressional district
Blas Ople	LDP	Former Labour Secretary and Senator
John Henry Osmeña	NPC	Representative from Cebu's 3rd congressional district
Aquilino Pimentel Jr.	PDP–Laban	former Senator
Miguel Romero	LDP	Representative from Negros Oriental's 2nd congressional district
Vicente Sotto III	LDP	Former singer, actor, and Senator
Ruben Torres	Independent	former Executive Secretary
Freddie Webb	LDP	Former athlete, actor, and Senator

== Election results ==
=== Presidential and vice presidential elections ===
Year	Presidential election			Vice presidential election		
Year	Candidate	Vote share	Result	Candidate	Vote share	Result
1998	Joseph Estrada	39.86%	Joseph Estrada (LAMMP)	Edgardo Angara	22.11%	Gloria Macapagal Arroyo (Lakas)

=== Legislative elections ===
House election	House Seats won	Result	President	Senate election	Senate Seats won	Ticket	Result
1998 (Note: Only who stood up under the banner. Does not include 9 Nationalist People's Coalition who independently stood up.)	55 / 257	Lakas–Victory '98 plurarity	Joseph Estrada	1998	7 / 24	Single party ticket	LAMMP win 7/12 seats

=== Senate results ===
The success of the coalition was partly because of the popularity of its presidential bet, Vice President Estrada who won the presidential election. His senatorial slate also gained majority of 7 out of 12 available seats in the Senate. The following were the LAMMP senatorial bets who won:

- Tito Sotto
- Nene Pimentel
- Rodolfo Biazon
- Blas Ople
- John Henry Osmeña
- Robert Jaworski
- Tessie Aquino-Oreta

The coalition also gained great majority in the House of Representatives and majority of elected local officials who ran as members of the coalition.

== Abolishment ==
LAMMP was abolished during the 2001 midterm legislative elections and was replaced by a new coalition of pro-Estrada legislators led by Angara's LDP, named Puwersa ng Masa (Force of the Masses) which was led by Estrada's wife, Luisa Pimentel-Ejercito.

== See also ==
- Puwersa ng Masa
- Pwersa ng Masang Pilipino
