= People Power Coalition =

Philippine political alliance in 2001

- Leader: Gloria Macapagal Arroyo
- Senate leader: Franklin Drilon
- Spokesperson: Conrado "Dodi" Limcaoco
- Founded: 2001
- Dissolved: 2003
- Succeeded by: K4; Alyansa ng Pag-asa
- Ideology: Conservative liberalism; Christian democracy
- Political position: Centre
- Coalition members: Aksyon; Lakas; Liberal; Nacionalista; NPC; PDP–Laban; PROMDI; Reporma; UMDP
- Colors: Yellow
- Slogan: Bagong Politika, Ating Pag-asa

People Power Coalition (PPC), formerly called "EDSA Forces", was a Philippine administration-based political multi-party electoral alliance in the May 14, 2001 midterm legislative elections. The coalition was created after the EDSA Revolution of 2001 that ousted Joseph Estrada from the presidency.

== Coalition members ==
The coalition included Lakas, the United Muslim Democrats of the Philippines, Liberal Party, the Nationalist People's Coalition, Aksyon Demokratiko, Nacionalista Party, Partido Demokratiko Pilipino–Lakas ng Bayan, Partido para sa Demokratikong Reporma–Lapiang Manggagawa, the Probinsya Muna Development Initiative, and numerous major regional and party-list political parties.

== Campaign ==
Arroyo presented the PPC senatorial slate as members of "good governance" and "new politics".

== Election day ==
In the voting day of May 2001 elections, PPC accused the Pwersa ng Masa camp of disinforming the public by saying that the PPC and the administration extends the voting hours into 5 o'clock of the afternoon.

== Slogan ==
The Coalition devised an acronym for the 13 senatorial candidates of PPC which is: VOT FOR D CHAMMP (stands for Vote for the Champ or Champion) V for Villar; O for Osmeña; T for Tañada, F for Flavier; O for Obet, R for Recto; D for Drilon; C for Chato; H for Herrera; A for Arroyo; M for Monsod; M for Magsaysay; and P for Pangilinan.

== The Senatorial Slate ==
Name	Party	Occupation	Elected
Joker Arroyo	Lakas	former Executive Secretary, Representative from Makati; Lead Prosecutor from the Joseph Estrada Impeachment trial	Yes
Liwayway Vinzons-Chato	Independent	former Bureau of Internal Revenue Commissioner	No
Franklin Drilon	Independent	Senator, and former Secretary of Justice	Yes
Juan Flavier	Lakas	Senator, and former Secretary of Health (1992–1995)	Yes
Ernesto Herrera	Lakas	former Senator	No
Ramon Magsaysay Jr.	Lakas	Senator	Yes
Winnie Monsod	Aksyon	Former Director General of the National Economic Development Authority, economist, UP Economics professor and TV personality	No
Serge Osmeña	PDP–Laban	Senator and 1998 Liberal Party vice presidential nominee (lost to Gloria Macapagal Arroyo)	Yes
Roberto Pagdanganan	Lakas	former Governor of Bulacan and 1998 Lakas–NUCD presidential candidate (nomination lost to Jose de Venecia)	No
Kiko Pangilinan	Liberal	lawyer, former Quezon City councilor and TV personality	Yes
Ralph Recto	Lakas	Economist, Representative from Batangas 4th district	Yes
Wigberto Tañada	Liberal	Representative from Quezon, former Senator	No
Manny Villar	Independent	Representative from Las Piñas at-large, and former Speaker of the House of Representatives (1998–2000)	Yes

== Election results ==
=== Legislative elections ===
Senate Election	Seats won	+/–	Result	House Election	House Seats	+/–	Result
2001 (Note: Multi-party coalition: (3 from Lakas, 3 Independents, 1 from PDP–Laban, 1 from Liberal))	8 / 13	▲8	Majority	2001 (Note: Only who stood under the PPC banner)	1 / 256	▲1	Majority

Eight out of 13 candidates won the possible 13 seats in the Senate namely. These are, in order of votes received:

- Joker Arroyo
- Franklin Drilon
- Juan Flavier
- Ramon Magsaysay Jr.
- Serge Osmeña
- Kiko Pangilinan
- Ralph Recto
- Manny Villar

== Criticism ==
Miriam Defensor Santiago, a member of PPC's rival coalition Puwersa ng Masa mocked the coalition's abbreviation into Puro Palpak Coalition. She also challenged the PPC's 13-0 movement, saying that if it succeeded, she should be gunned down in Luneta.

== Dissolve ==
In October 2002, PPC is predicted to be dissolved, as Congressman Buyson Villarama said that the PPC could be divided into two factions: a group composed of the "purists and fundamentalists" among the EDSA Dos players, and the other consisting of "backsliders." With the Partido Reporma, Aksyon, and Promdi left in November, PPC was totally dissolved in December 2003 for the upcoming elections in May 2004, being replaced by K-4.

== See also ==
- Sunshine Coalition, their lower house counterpart
- Puwersa ng Masa, People Power Coalition's rival coalition
- Koalisyon ng Katapatan at Karanasan sa Kinabukasan, successor coalition in 2004
- Lakas–NUCD 1998 Senatorial slate, the Ramos' administration's senatorial slate during the 1998 national elections
