= Loi Ejercito =

Filipina politician and physician (born 1930)

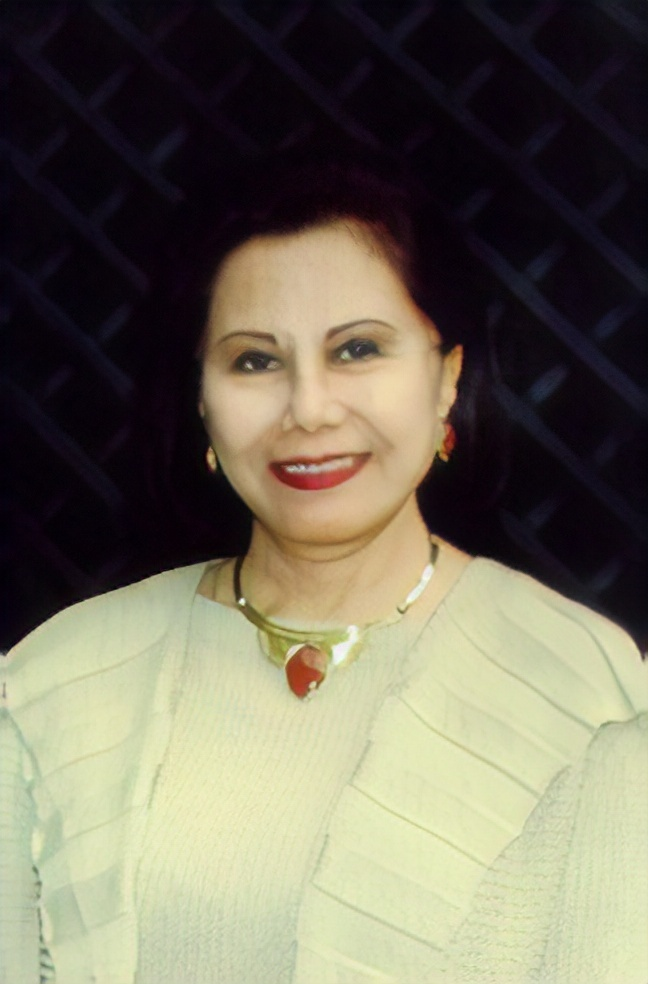
- Ejercito in 1999

First Lady of the Philippines
- In role June 30, 1998 – January 20, 2001
- President: Joseph Estrada
- Preceded by: Amelita Ramos
- Succeeded by: Jose Miguel Arroyo (First Gentleman)

Senator of the Philippines
- In office June 30, 2001 – June 30, 2007

Personal details
- Born: Luisa Fernández Pimentel; June 2, 1930 (age 96) Iba, Zambales, Philippine Islands
- Party: PMP (2004–present); Independent (2001–2004)
- Spouse: Joseph Estrada (m. 1959)
- Children: 3, including Jinggoy
- Education: University of Santo Tomas (AA, MD)
- Occupation: Physician
- Profession: Psychiatrist

Luisa Fernández Pimentel-Ejército (Tagalog pronunciation: [pi.mɛnˈtɛl ʔɛˌhɛːɾ.sɪˈto]; born June 2, 1930), commonly known as Loi Ejército, is a Filipina politician and physician who last served as a Senator of the Philippines from 2001 to 2007. She is married to former Philippine President Joseph Ejercito Estrada, and was the twelfth First Spouse of the Philippines from 1998 to 2001. Her son, Jinggoy Ejercito Estrada, is an incumbent senator since 2022 and previously from 2004 to 2016.

== Early life and career ==
Ejercito was born Luisa Fernandez Pimentel on June 2, 1930 to Rufino Pimentel and Manuela Fernandez (1907–1994). She grew up and received her primary and secondary education in the town of Iba in Zambales. She later pursued higher education at University of Santo Tomas, where she obtained an associate in arts degree from the College of Liberal Arts in 1949 and doctor of medicine in 1954. After which, she worked as a professor at the university's Faculty of Medicine and Surgery and as a physician at the University of Santo Tomas Hospital. She later worked at the National Center for Mental Health (NCMH), where she became a Junior Resident. There, she met her husband, actor Joseph Estrada.

In 1960, she was a training-fellow at the Royal Park Hospital in Melbourne, Australia and Ballarat Mental Hospital Department. She also served as a Training Fellow at Ararat Mental Hospital in 1961. In 1962, she returned to the Philippines and established the Mental Health Department at Davao General Hospital in Davao City. For fifteen years, starting in 1972, she has also been involved as a volunteer doctor at San Martin de Porres Charity Hospital in San Juan.

Due to Estrada's extramarital affair with Guia Gomez in the 1960s, Ejercito separated from her husband for 18 years and moved to the United States with their three children. She and Estrada were seen reunited again when he ran for senator in 1987.

== Public role ==
A psychiatrist by profession, Loi was dubbed First Lady ng Masa (First Lady of the Masses), and Doktora ng Masa (Doctor of the Masses) because of her medical and outreach missions during her term.

On October 12, 1999, she received an Honorary Doctorate degree in philosophy from Kyung Hee University.

After her husband was deposed in the Second EDSA Revolution in January 2001 and replaced by Vice President Gloria Macapagal Arroyo, she ran as a candidate of the Puwersa ng Masa opposition coalition for a seat in Senate. In the days after Estrada and her son Jinggoy were arrested on April 25 for plunder, she was among the politicians who spoke out against the arrest at pro-Estrada rallies that preceded the May 1 riots near Malacañang Palace. She won her senate seat after placing 11th overall in the Senate election in May 2001 and served in the 12th and the 13th Congress, making her the first First Lady to win a seat in the Senate. With the election of her son Jinggoy in 2004, they became the first ever mother-and-son as incumbent senators in Philippine Senate history.

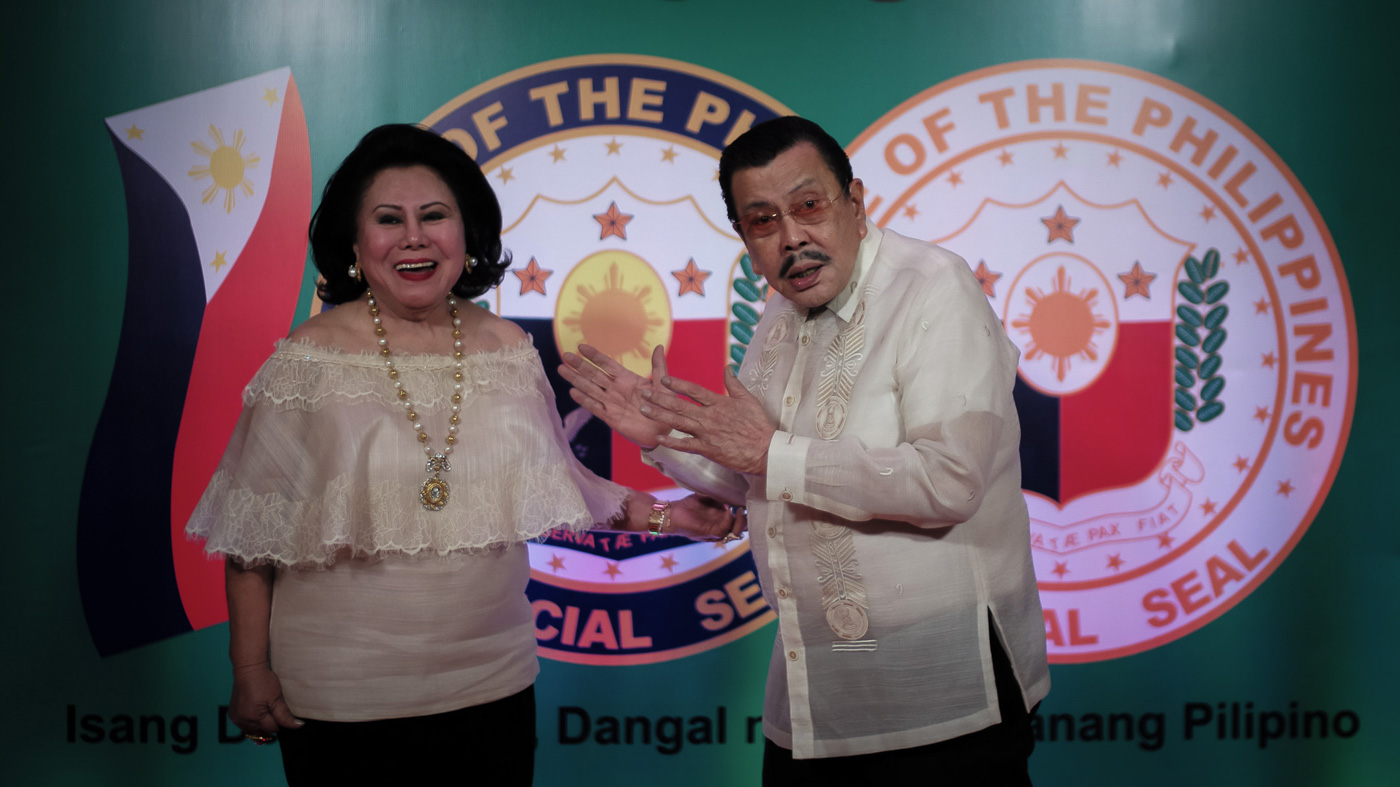
Estrada in 2016 with husband Joseph Estrada

During her tenure (2001–2007), she authored 121 bills and 13 resolutions, some of which have already been enacted into law:

- R.A. No. 9241, The National Health Insurance Program;
- R.A. No. 9211, The No Smoking Act;
- R.A. No. 9167, The Film Development Council of the Philippines,
- R.A. No. 9165, The Comprehensive Dangerous Drugs Act; and
- R.A. No. 9275, The Clean Water Act.

Ejercito decided to seek re-election in 2007, but she didn't push through with it. At the end of her Senate term, she retired from politics.

== Post-Senate ==
In January 2014, letters sent to the Department of Agriculture showed that Ejercito allocated her pork barrel to at least two non-governmental organizations linked to Janet Lim-Napoles during her Senate term.

In June 2014, she was named as the personal physician of her son Jinggoy, who was one of the senators implicated and detained for their alleged involvement in the pork barrel scam.

On June 2, 2022, coinciding with her 92nd birthday, she released her memoir entitled “Love, Mommyla: My Memories of 9 Decades,” a 104-pager published by her daughter Jackie. Percentage of the sales of the memoir would go to their medical missions.

Honorary titles
Preceded by Amelita Ramos	First Lady of the Philippines; 1998–2001	Succeeded by Jose Miguel Arroyo as First Gentleman
