= Youth Reform Movement =

Youth group supporting Miriam Defensor Santiago

- Predecessor: Youth for Miriam
- Formation: August 9, 2017 (date incorporated)
- Type: Reformist Centre; Political sociology Civil society Youth activism Media activism
- Headquarters: Caloocan
- Key people: Gerard Peñero; Paolo Quimbo; Angela Bautista; Angel Salonga; Jan Langomez; Kreig Abesamis; Julius Payawal Fernandez; Rissa Ofilada
- Website: www.fb.com/YRMPH

Youth Reform Movement Philippines (YRMPH) is a non-profit sociopolitical organization composed of the youth sector registered within the Philippine Securities and Exchange Commission, operating globally through a network of young Filipino university students and youth leaders with particular interest in Philippine political and sociocivic affairs. The organization was formerly known as Youth for Miriam, the youth arm of the 2016 presidential campaign of Miriam Defensor Santiago, initially partnering with People's Reform Party, the political party of Defensor Santiago.

It envisions to educate and encourage more youth to be involved in civic and public affairs in the Philippines, with adherence to the political philosophies espoused by the highly decorated jurist and statesperson Miriam Defensor Santiago. The organization is also cited in the Supreme Court decision related to the ouster of Maria Lourdes Sereno as Chief Justice of the Supreme Court of the Philippines.

== History ==
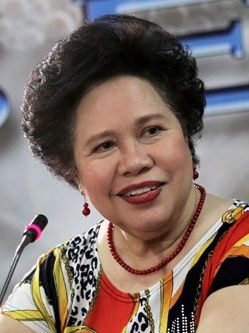
Miriam Defensor Santiago

Gaining media traction at the height of Defensor Santiago's consistent delivery of tirades against the key people involved with several political scandals in the Philippines on all political sides, particularly the trial of Chief Justice Renato Corona and Priority Development Assistance Fund scam, coinciding with the rolling out of free Facebook access in the Philippines, several independent Facebook pages showing support for the presidential candidacy of Miriam Defensor Santiago in the Philippines started, even when the late Defensor Santiago has made it public her having lung cancer.

In an effort to unify the strategies for the presidential campaign, two key people close to Defensor Santiago: Kim Patria (former Yahoo! News contributor, then media coordinator for Senator Defensor Santiago) and Rissa Ofilada (then vice president at Credit Suisse and former chief of staff of Defensor Santiago, specially tapped for the 2016 presidential campaign), reached out to the social media group administrators to aid in the upcoming campaign. On October 16, 2015, Miriam Defensor Santiago filed her certificate of candidacy and the social media groups have started mobilizing their campaign materials on key social media platforms Facebook, Twitter, and Instagram independent of strategies provided by People's Reform Party.

On February 14, 2016, Youth for Miriam was launched, convening the different youth support groups of Defensor Santiago from different parts of the Philippines, with 20 chapters of around 5,000 members in total from all around the world. Around this time, the group also launched the Youth for Miriam Provincial Caravan, which was a public gimmick to campaign for the senator who has limited herself from local sorties. On May 1, 2016, YRMPH represented the Defensor Santiago campaign in a forum organized and aired by The Filipino Channel from its former studios at Redwood City, California, catering to the overseas absentee voters in North America.

After Defensor Santiago's unsuccessful try for the presidency, the organization has rebranded itself as a youth group in civil society, inspired by the teachings and writings of the then retired senator, and renamed the organization as Youth Reform Movement. Upon the death of Defensor Santiago on September 29, 2016, the organization has served as volunteers for her funeral services, and is in constant partnership and communication with the family of the late senator for other public affairs since. Through the efforts of United States-based law student Angela Bautista, the organization was formally registered into the Securities and Exchange Commission as Youth Reform Movement PH Inc. on August 9, 2017, and is in constant partnership with other youth organizations and university student councils in the Philippines for several conferences, symposiums, and outreach projects, and has since been using the acronym YRMPH in public releases.

== Pillar Projects ==
=== Pamaskong Bigas ni Miriam ===
Pamaskong Bigas ni Miriam is an annual gift-giving project of the late Miriam Defensor Santiago while she was still alive. In 2016, under the leadership of chairperson Rhyan Malandog and core members Ejhay Talagtag and Vincent Agustin, YRMPH formally took over the continuation of the gift-giving project with the help of private donors and other organizations. In this project, the organization deliberates on which impoverished barangays in the Philippines will receive the sacks of rice to be shared with the beneficiaries during December of each year.

=== Quezon City Youth Reform Congress 2017 ===
The flagship project of YRMPH is the Youth Reform Congress which was first held at the Quezon City Hall on March 4, 2017. The conference was a partnership project with the City Government of Quezon City under Mayor Joy Belmonte. The event was covered by the University of the Philippines' DZUP and When In Manila.

=== Harana Para Kay Miriam ===
YRMPH held Harana Para Kay Miriam at the Loyola Memorial Park on the late senator's first death anniversary on September 29, 2017. The event was an open-mic night organized by Rissa Ofilada, former Chief of Staff of Defensor Santiago, attended by family and friends of the late senator. Among the featured performers was Jes Dizon, who was known for her impersonations of the late senator in theatre and television skits such as her performances at UP SAMASKOM'S Live Aids and at Sunday PinaSaya on GMA Network.

=== TALKhang: Human Rights Forum ===
On November 29, 2017, at the height of the Philippine government's crackdown on illegal drugs came the issues on human rights abuses by the enforcing authorities. YRMPH executed the organization's first of many several university-based conference events, under the helm of Jan Langomez. YRMPH partnered with the student council of the Philippine Women's University, and launched TALKhang which tackled the Philippine drug war from perspectives of different public sectors. The title of the event was a wordplay on the informal name used to refer to the government's crackdown on illegal drugs which is tokhang.

=== Quezon Service Cross Campaign ===
A core member and then California State University East Bay communication instructor Julius Fernandez rallied the organization through a Change.org petition page to lobby at the Philippine Senate and House of Representatives for the posthumous conferment of the Quezon Service Cross to Defensor Santiago in 2017. The Senate quickly moved for the nomination, securing majority of votes for the conferment with the leadership of Senators Grace Poe and Sonny Angara. The Quezon Service Cross is the highest national recognition of the Republic of the Philippines, necessitating concurrence of both houses of Congress and approval of the President. The awarding ceremony was held at the Malacañang Palace on December 3, 2018, attended by the Youth Reform Movement and Heart Evangelista.

=== Mumshie on Fire ===
At the height of the Quo warranto petition against Maria Lourdes Sereno and with consideration to favorable words and praise delivered by the late Senate Defensor Santiago towards Maria Lourdes Sereno, YRMPH, under the leadership of Paolo Quimbo and Julius Fernandez, invited then Chief Justice on-leave Maria Lourdes Sereno to speak at the forum held at the University of the Philippines Diliman on May 5, 2018. The event was entitled The Mumshie on Fire: Speak Truth To Power in an effort to boost awareness of the quo warranto issue among younger generations who have been exposed to the Filipino slang word mumshie, meaning mother, and to make the event more informal amid having a guest of such stature.

=== Paskong Manileño ===
Paskong Manileño is a joint project of YRMPH with the City Government of Manila under Mayor Isko Moreno, and the University of the East-Sandigan sa Silangan organization catering to the elderly. It was a project coordinated by Vincent Agustin, held on December 21, 2019, at the Home for the Aged-Luwalhati ng Maynila facility.

=== BOOsina ===
While in the middle of the COVID-19 pandemic, the Philippine government prioritized the revision of the Human Security Act, gaining considerable amount of dissent from religious and civil society groups espousing civil liberties and human rights. The revised law, entitled "Anti-Terrorism Act of 2020" has already merited Congressional approval in both houses by the time that YRMPH, as initiated by its vice chairperson Paolo Quimbo and core member Julius Fernandez, planned to execute the #BOOsina (a wordplay on 'boo' and the Filipino word busina, which means 'automobile horn') campaign - an invitation for Filipinos to honk their horns for 12 minutes on June 12, 2020, coinciding with the commemoration of the Independence Day while practicing physical distancing prescribed for health reasons. The main location was at the University of the Philippines Diliman. The protestation occurred amidst stern warnings from the Department of Justice on the prohibitions for mass gatherings. Former Chief Justice Maria Lourdes Sereno joined the #BOOsina campaign.

=== Ambagan Para sa Bayan ===
Coming from the dearth in a widespread centralized effort for donation drives to support the flooded communities at the onset of typhoons Ulysses and Rolly, YRMPH partnered with youth leaders in Rizal, led by Cyron Aranas, and created Ambagan Para Sa Bayan via Facebook, with a fully transparent tracker of donors publicly visible through Google Sheets platform. The drive garnered an estimated Php 160,000.00.

== See also ==
- Miriam Defensor Santiago
- People's Reform Party
