= Chief Presidential Legal Counsel =

Office of the Chief Presidential Legal Counsel
- Tanggapan ng Punong Tagapayo sa Batas ng Pangulo
- Office seal

- Incumbent; Anna Liza Logan since December 16, 2025
- Member of: Cabinet; National Security Council
- Appointer: President of the Philippines
- Constituting instrument: OP MEMORANDUM ORDER NO. 139
- Formation: June 7, 1993

The Chief Presidential Legal Counsel (CPLC) (Filipino: Tanggapan ng Punong Tagapayo sa Batas ng Pangulo) is a key unit within the Office of the President of the Philippines, responsible for providing direct legal advice, assistance, and counsel to the president on various matters including policy, litigation, and executive functions.

== History ==
The office traces its roots to the early 1990s under president Fidel V. Ramos, formalized through Office of the president Memorandum Order No. 139 dated June 7, 1993 (adopted June 24, 1993), which delineated its authority over certain appointments, appealed cases, and duties overlapping with the Executive Secretary.

== List of Chief Presidential Legal Counsels ==
No.	Name	Image	Term	President(s) served
1.	Antonio Carpio		June 7, 1993 – June 30, 1998	Fidel V. Ramos
2.	Antonio Nachura		June 30, 1998 – January 20, 2001	Joseph Estrada
3.	Sergio Apostol		January 20, 2001 – June 30, 2010	Gloria Macapagal Arroyo
4.	Eduardo de Mesa		June 30, 2010 – January 10, 2013	Benigno Aquino III
5.	Alfredo Benjamin Caguioa		January 10, 2013 – October 12, 2015	Benigno Aquino III
6.	Judd H. Polloso		October 12, 2015 – June 30, 2016	Benigno Aquino III
7.	Salvador Panelo		June 30, 2016 – October 8, 2021	Rodrigo Duterte
8.	Jesus Melchor Quitain		October 19, 2021 – June 30, 2022	Rodrigo Duterte
9.	Juan Ponce Enrile		June 30, 2022 – November 13, 2025	Bongbong Marcos
10.	Anna Liza Logan		December 16, 2025 – present	Bongbong Marcos

== See also ==
- Executive Secretary (Philippines)
- Office of the President of the Philippines
