= Miriam Defensor Santiago =

Filipino politician, lawyer, and author (1945–2016)

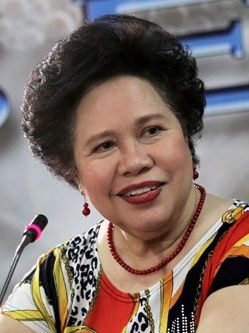
- Defensor Santiago in 2012

Senator of the Philippines
- In office June 30, 2004 – June 30, 2016
- In office June 30, 1995 – June 30, 2001

Judge of the International Criminal Court
- Elect
- In role March 11, 2012 – June 4, 2014
- Nominated by: Philippines
- Appointed by: Assembly of States Parties
- Succeeded by: Raul Pangalangan

Chair of the Senate Foreign Relations Committee
- In office July 22, 2013 – June 30, 2016
- Preceded by: Loren Legarda
- Succeeded by: Alan Peter Cayetano

4th Secretary of Agrarian Reform
- In office July 20, 1989 – January 4, 1990
- President: Corazon Aquino
- Preceded by: Philip Ella Juico
- Succeeded by: Florencio Abad

Commissioner of the Bureau of Immigration
- In office January 4, 1988 – July 17, 1989

Personal details
- Born: Miriam Palma Defensor; June 15, 1945 Iloilo City, Philippines
- Died: September 29, 2016 (aged 71) Taguig, Philippines
- Resting place: Loyola Memorial Park, Marikina
- Party: People's Reform Party (1991–2016)
- Spouse: Narciso Santiago Jr. (m. 1970)
- Children: Narciso III; Alexander Robert
- Education: University of the Philippines Visayas (BA); University of the Philippines Diliman (LLB); University of Michigan (LLM, SJD); Maryhill School of Theology (MA)
- Website: Official website

Miriam Palma Defensor-Santiago GCS QSC (June 15, 1945 – September 29, 2016) was a Filipino stateswoman, judge and lawyer who served in all three branches of the Philippine government: judicial, executive, and legislative. Defensor Santiago was known for being a long serving senator of the Philippines and an elected judge of the International Criminal Court. She is the sole female recipient of the Philippines' highest national honor, the Quezon Service Cross.

In 1988, Defensor Santiago was named laureate of the Ramon Magsaysay Award for government service, with a citation for bold and moral leadership in cleaning up a graft-ridden government agency. After being appointed by President Corazon Aquino as secretary of agrarian reform from 1989 to 1990, she ran in the 1992 presidential election but was defeated in events that involved a car crash injury and power outages during voting process. Defensor Santiago would then serve three terms in the Philippine Senate. After former president Joseph Estrada was arrested on April 25, 2001, she was among the politicians who spoke against EDSA II at pro-Estrada rallies that preceded the May 1 riot near Malacañang Palace.

In 2012, Defensor Santiago was elected as a judge of the International Criminal Court. She later resigned from the post, citing chronic fatigue syndrome. On October 13, 2015, Defensor Santiago declared her third candidacy for president of the Philippines in the 2016 election after her doctors from the United States declared her cancer "stable" and "receded" but lost the election. She died from complications from her cancer on September 29, 2016, and was buried days later at Loyola Memorial Park in Marikina. In December 2018, the prestigious Quezon Service Cross was posthumously conferred upon Defensor Santiago, making her the first woman and the sixth person ever to be awarded. Defensor Santiago was known as the "Iron Lady of Asia". She is colloquially known in Philippine pop culture as simply Miriam or MDS and is cited for her dedication to public service in the Philippine government.

== Early life and education ==
Defensor Santiago was born Miriam Palma Defensor in Iloilo City to Benjamin Defensor, a local judge, and Dimpna Palma, a college dean as the eldest of seven children on June 15, 1945. She was a class valedictorian in grade school, high school, and undergraduate school. She graduated from high school in Iloilo Provincial High School. (Note: Now the Iloilo National High School) In 1965, Defensor Santiago graduated with a Bachelor of Arts degree in political science, magna cum laude from the then University of the Philippines College Iloilo. After graduation, she was elected to the Pi Gamma Mu and Phi Kappa Phi honor societies. She proceeded to the University of the Philippines College of Law. There, she was champion in numerous oratorical contests, debates, and topped written examinations. She became the first female editor of the student newspaper, The Philippine Collegian, and was twice appointed Reserve Officers' Training Corps muse. She graduated with a Bachelor of Laws, cum laude, from the University of the Philippines College of Law in Diliman.

Defensor Santiago went on a fellowship to the United States and earned the Master of Laws and Doctor of Juridical Science degrees at the University of Michigan, studying there from 1974 to 1976. Following her fellowship, she studied in numerous schools including Oxford, Harvard, Cambridge, The Hague Academy of International Law, and the Sophia University. In Oxford, she was a research fellow at St. Hilda's College. At Cambridge, she was a research fellow at the Lauterpacht Research Centre for International Law. When she was already a senator, she earned the Master of Religious Studies degree at the Maryhill School of Theology. Her inspiration to become a lawyer and legislator growing up was Arturo Tolentino; she gained experience by being mentored by him.

== Early career ==
Defensor Santiago served as a special assistant at the Department of Justice before the martial law under Ferdinand Marcos. In the position, she served as one of Marcos' speechwriters. Defensor Santiago served as Legal Officer of the United Nations High Commissioner for Refugees at Geneva, Switzerland. She was assigned to the Conferences and Treaties Section and gained experience at treaty negotiation and drafting. She resigned her position when her father developed prostate cancer.

In 1983, Defensor Santiago was appointed judge of the Regional Trial Court (RTC) of Quezon City. She was the youngest judge appointed to Metro Manila, exempt from the rule for newcomers to be appointed to provinces outside Metro Manila. The Ramon Magsaysay Award Foundation said she handled a record 50 cases a month by avoiding delays and postponements. She also disposed of the highest number of cases in Metro Manila.

Defensor Santiago's decision against martial law drew public attention. At that time, alleged illegal public assemblies were declared as crimes and were punishable by death. A group of activist students from the University of the Philippines and Ateneo, as well as activists in the film industry, staged a rally in a central business district, and denounced the First Lady for her excesses. This caused Marcos to issue an order which authorized the military to hold suspects indefinitely without bail. Defensor Santiago suspended hearings on all other pending cases and conducted whole-day trials. She eventually ordered the military to allow the students to post bail.

=== Immigration Commissioner ===
After martial law ended, President Corazon Aquino appointed Defensor Santiago as commissioner of the Bureau of Immigration and Deportation in 1988. According to The New York Times, the BID was one of the most corrupt government agencies in Southeast Asia. Defensor Santiago declared the Philippines "the fake passport capital of the world", and directed raids against criminal syndicates, including the Yakuza. She filled the CID detention center with alien criminals and ordered the construction of another detention center. She protected legal aliens from extortion by requesting President Aquino to issue an executive order that authorized the "alien legalization program". She received serious death threats but proclaimed: "I eat death threats for breakfast". A member of the House of Representatives, Laguna Rep. Nereo Joaquin delivered a privilege speech in 1992 and denounced her raids against pedophile communities in Central Luzon run by alien pedophiles. Defensor Santiago responded by calling him "fungus face".

=== Secretary of Agrarian Reform ===
President Aquino promoted Defensor-Santiago to a member of her cabinet as Secretary of Agrarian Reform in 1989. She eventually returned to private citizenship. She served as the chair of the Presidential Agrarian Reform Council Executive Committee in 1989.

== 1992 presidential campaign ==
Defensor Santiago's candidacy for President of the Philippines was confirmed on February 19, 1990. She ran under the People's Reform Party (PRP) with a senatorial ticket of 16 candidates during the 1992 presidential campaign; Ramon Magsaysay Jr. was her running mate. Due to a lack of funding, she called on university students to campaign house-to-house for her. She had a large fanbase during her campaigns and rallies. While campaigning on April 28, 1991, she was injured in a car crash, which she claimed was an assassination attempt. According to Cynthia Balana of Philippine Daily Inquirer, she was stationed at the V. Luna General Hospital. She eventually went to the Metropolitan Hospital College of Nursing. At the hospital, a Catholic priest administered the last rites of the dying. Two months later, she recovered and continued campaigning. When she continued campaigning, numerous presidential surveys including ones from the Social Weather Stations and the University of Santo Tomas predicted her as the winner. Since Defensor Santiago did not have funding, her youth supporters served as poll watchers in precincts. During the first televised presidential debates in the election, she won the award of "Best Debater".

Defensor Santiago was leading the canvassing of votes for the first five days. Following a string of power outages, the tabulation concluded, and Ramos was declared president-elect with a vote count of 5,342,521, 23.6 percent of the votes. Defensor Santiago, on the other hand, gained a smaller 4,468,173 votes, 19.7 percent of the votes. According to the Senate of the Philippines, 100 candidates from the PRP won; in Western Visayas, her home region, she won 98 percent of the votes. Defensor Santiago filed a protest before the Supreme Court as an electoral tribunal, citing power outages during the counting of votes as evidence of massive fraud. Her election protest was eventually dismissed on a technicality. Public outrage over the presidential results prompted Newsweek to feature her and her rival on the cover with the question: "Was the Election Fair?" In another cover story, Philippines Free Press magazine asked: "Who's the Real President?". The quote, "Miriam won in the elections but lost in the counting" became popularized due to her loss.

== Senator ==
=== First term, 1995–2001; EDSA II and III ===
Summer sa Senado Program (1999)

Miriam Defensor‑Santiago started Summer sa Senado in 1999. This summer internship program helps young Filipinos see how the legislative process works. Participants learn about the Senate’s history how it is organized and what it does. They also get to suggest and defend their bills. A resolution from the Senate in 2010 said that more, than 300 interns have gone through Summer sa Senado since it began. Summer sa Senado shows how Miriam Defensor‑Santiago wanted to get youth involved in affairs and ready young Filipinos for future leadership roles.

Defensor Santiago was first elected senator in 1995. She was among the yearly topnotchers by the number of bills filed. She ran in the 1998 Philippine presidential election and did not field any senatorial candidates. In the election, she gained 7th place out of 10 candidates with 797,206 votes, serving as 3 percent of the votes. In 2000, she filed in the Senate the first version of the anti-discrimination bill which would later become the SOGIE Equality Bill. She was one of the few senators who were against the opening of the second envelope—an envelope which allegedly contained evidence against then-President Joseph Estrada—during Estrada's impeachment trial; he was her foe in the 1998 presidential elections. She said afterwards:

At that time, I wanted to apply the rules of court technically. Since there is no allegation of wrongdoing in connection with the notorious second envelope, I voted that we should not open the second envelope until and after the complaint had already been amended [...] I was among those demonized because I voted against the opening of the second envelope – dahil ang paniwala ng taong bayan, kung ayaw namin buksan ang second envelope na 'yan, may tinatago kami. (transl. because in the belief of the masses if we don't want to open the envelope, then we are hiding something.)

—

Estrada was ousted in the Second EDSA Revolution in January 2001 and succeeded by Vice President Gloria Macapagal Arroyo, which Defensor Santiago considered illegal under the Philippine Constitution due to the lack of a formal resignation from Estrada. In her support for Estrada, she once mentioned that she would jump off an airplane without a parachute if Estrada is arrested. After Estrada's arrest on April 25, 2001, Defensor Santiago joined other politicians in attending and speaking at pro-Estrada rallies held in the succeeding days at EDSA Shrine, where she demanded the resignation of Arroyo and her entire cabinet and the reinstatement of Estrada as president lest the protesters storm Malacañang Palace. The rallies she spoke in were soon followed by the May 1 riots initiated by the rallyists going to Malacañang, where reporters from the Philippine Daily Inquirer noted their attempts to storm the institution's premises being preceded by statements from Santiago the previous night that went: "I am bored. Let's not wait for the military and police. Let's do it, just us. Now!" After the May 1 incident, Santiago remained defiant in her stance against the Arroyo presidency, and was denounced by her cousin, Governor Arthur Defensor Sr. of Iloilo, for her rhetoric. Defensor Santiago lost re-election to the Senate in the 2001 elections, gaining 15th place with 9,622,742 votes.

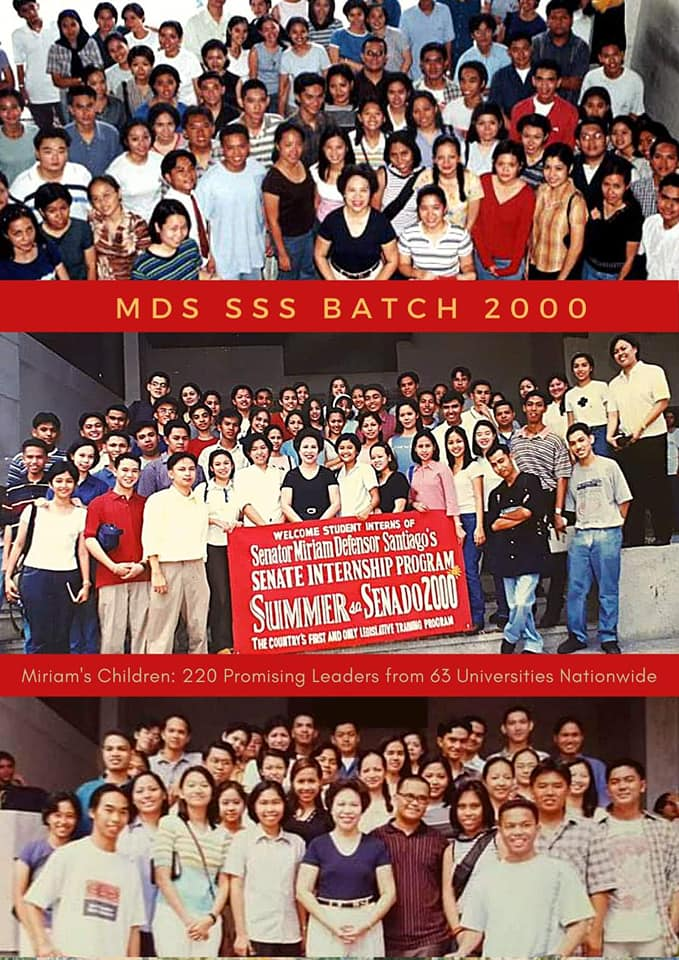
Interns of Defensor-Santiago's program Summer Sa Senado

=== Second term, 2004–2010 ===
Defensor Santiago ran for senator in 2004 and was elected as a part of the People's Reform Party. Estrada was pardoned by President Arroyo on October 26, 2007. The Renewable Energy Act of 2008 mandated the government to shift the energy source of the country from coal and oil into solar, wind, and other renewable sources; Defensor Santiago included a proposal in the bill. Senate Bill No. 2583, known as the Climate Change Act of 2009, was passed by the Senate on June 3, 2009, incorporating amendments from Defensor Santiago. The bill highlights the action needed in solving climate change.

=== Third term, 2010–2016 ===
She ran again for senator in 2010 and won, gaining third place with a vote count of 15,231,194 votes. During this term, she served as the chair of the Foreign Affairs Committee of the Commission on Appointments. In 2011, Defensor Santiago was elected as a judge of the International Criminal Court (ICC), gaining 79 votes in the first round. She was the first Asian from a developing country to be elected to such a post. However, she deferred her March 2012 oath-taking, citing poor health. She then submitted her resignation on June 4, 2014, due to "personal reasons" according to the ICC; according to them, she did not assume her functions in the court.

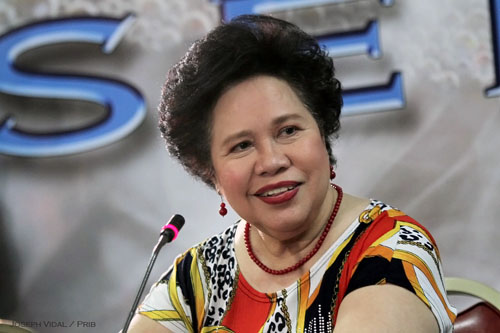
Defensor-Santiago in 2012, talking about her priority bills during the weekly Kapihan sa Senado

She was one of the three senators who voted against the conviction of Supreme Court Chief Justice Renato Corona during his impeachment trial on May 29, 2012; Corona was ultimately found guilty of his failure to disclose to the public his statement of assets, liabilities and net worth. On December 4, she exposed that the Senate president, Juan Ponce Enrile, used Senate funds to give away as cash gifts. Every senator, except Defensor Santiago and two others, received ₱2 million. This led to the Priority Development Assistance Fund scandal, which charged the Senate president with charges of plunder from Defensor Santiago's live Senate hearings.

On December 17, the Reproductive Health Act of 2012, which instilled reproductive health education throughout the nation, was passed. The law was created by Pia Cayetano along with Defensor Santiago. The Philippine Act on Crimes Against International Humanitarian Law proposed to safeguard human rights in the nation. Defensor Santiago was the senator who filed the act. She exposed and named numerous jueteng (illegal gambling) lords and illegal-logging lords throughout this term. She was the first Filipino elected as a commissioner for the International Development Law Organization (IDLO) in 2016. Her role in the organization was advisory to the international law community.

== 2016 presidential campaign ==
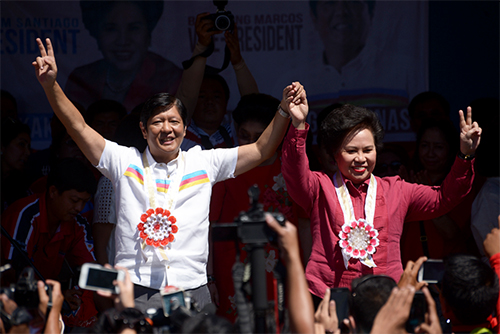
Senators Defensor-Santiago and Bongbong Marcos in Batac during the 2016 presidential campaign

When she was in the Senate in September 2014, Defensor Santiago named Rodrigo Duterte, Gilbert Teodoro, and Grace Poe to be her potential running mates if she ran for president. She had lung cancer which developed in the years preceding the election. In October 2015, Defensor Santiago announced her intention to run in the 2016 Philippine presidential election after her cancer was deemed 'stable' and 'receded' by doctors from the United States. She eventually confirmed that Senator Bongbong Marcos would serve as her running mate for vice president. Her senatorial slate consisted of Jericho Petilla, Susan Ople, Francis Tolentino, Joel Villanueva, Dionisio Santiago, and Edu Manzano. An additional four people were also added in the slate, namely Ralph Recto, Martin Romualdez, Manny Pacquiao, and Isko Moreno. She held her proclamation rally at the Mariano Marcos State University in Batac on February 9.

In an interview with the ANC, Duterte said: 'If you want extraordinary competence and integrity, vote for Miriam [Defensor-Santiago]." Her campaign focused on the youth sector, making use of social media. She was a landslide winner in numerous polls conducted in various public and private universities and colleges in the country. Despite this, she lost in the elections, gaining fifth place out of six candidates with 1,424,520 votes. Marcos fared better, gaining second place out of six candidates with 13,803,966 votes. Despite her loss, she reacted positively, telling her followers to "cheer up". Defensor Santiago was subsequently called "the greatest president we never had", a title which had been associated with her prior to her presidential run.

== Death ==
Defensor Santiago was placed in an Intensive care unit (ICU) on May 31 due to her cancer which had developed in the preceding years. According to her husband, she was "bearing well with her trademark sense of humor." In September, her daughter-in-law said that she was still undergoing treatment for her cancer, but not at an ICU.

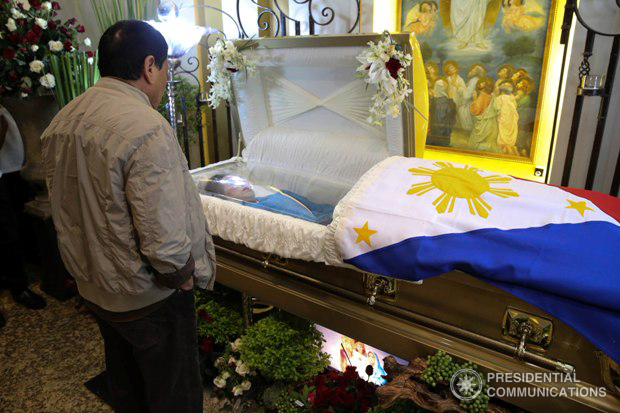
President Rodrigo Duterte attends the wake of Defensor Santiago at the Cubao Cathedral on October 2, 2016.

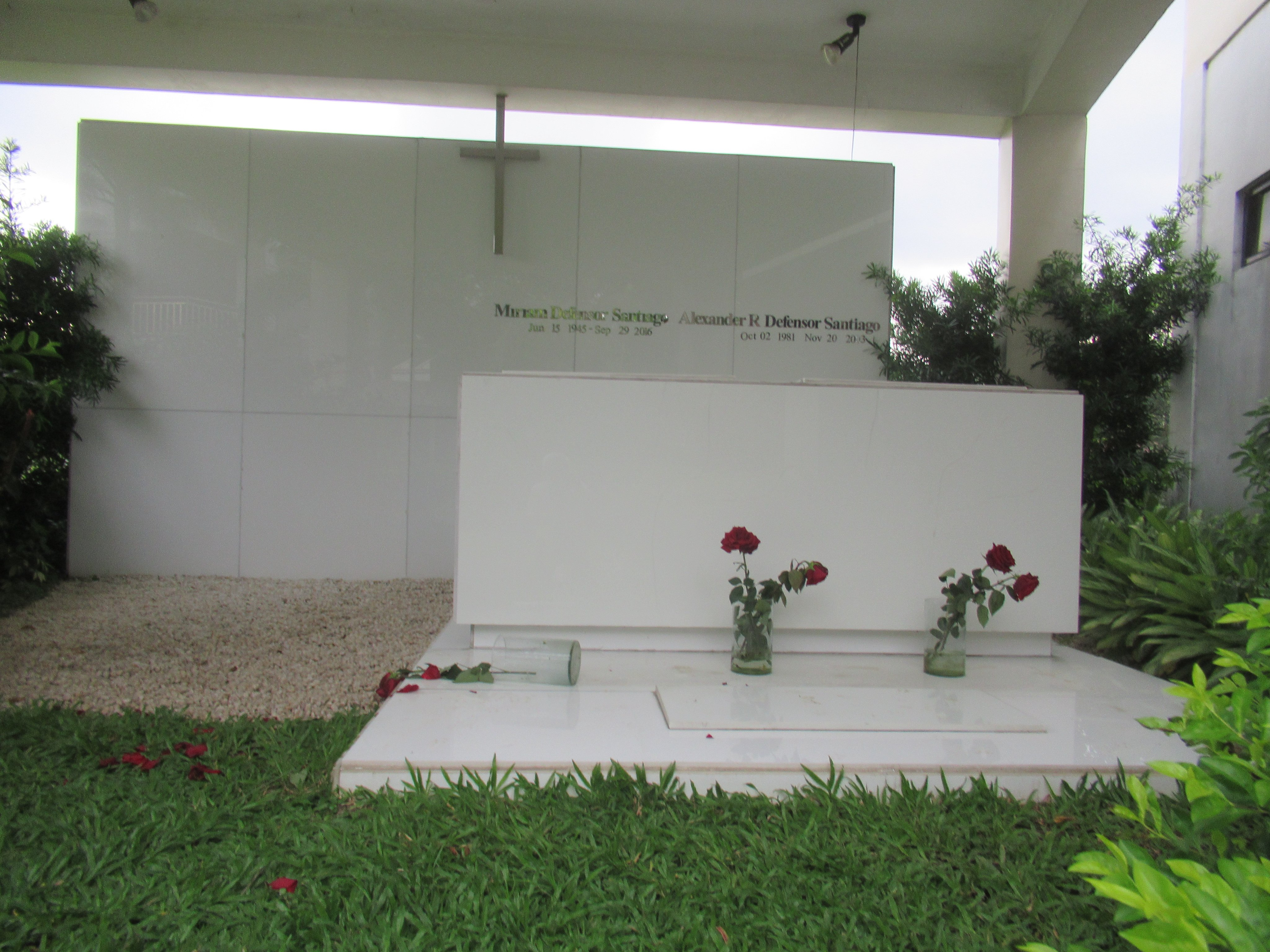
Tomb of Defensor Santiago and her son Alexander at Loyola Memorial Park, Marikina

At the age of 71, Defensor Santiago died in her sleep at exactly 8:52 a.m. PHT (UTC+08:00) on September 29, 2016, while she was confined at the St. Luke's Medical Center - Global City in Taguig from lung cancer. Santiago's last words according to her husband were, "I accept this. I do not want to do anything heroic." While her last wish was to remain only in the memory of her own family, her body lay in state at the Cathedral Grottos of the Immaculate Conception Cathedral in Cubao the following day. Following a Catholic funeral Mass, she was interred at the Loyola Memorial Park in Marikina on October 2, beside the tomb of her son, Alexander, who died in 2003. Santiago's hometown, Iloilo City, declared a day of mourning for Defensor Santiago and flew the Philippine flag half-mast from September 29 to October 17, 2016. The local government said in an official statement that Defensor Santiago 'brought pride and honor to her hometown'. Senator Franklin Drilon described her as a "pillar" of the national justice system.

== Legacy and awards ==
In 1985, Defensor Santiago was awarded The Outstanding Young Men Award by the Philippine Jaycees. She was then awarded The Outstanding Women in the Nation's Service Award by the Philippine Lions the next day. Shortly after she was selected as the Immigration Commissioner in 1988, the Rockefeller Foundation named her a laureate of the Magsaysay Award for government service "for bold and moral leadership in cleaning up a graft-ridden government agency." That same year, she was awarded the Most Outstanding Alumna in Law award by the University of the Philippines, the Gold Vision Triangle Award by YMCA Philippines, and the Republic Anniversary Award by the Civic Assembly of Women of the Philippines. In 1990, she was given the Golden Jubilee Achievement Award by the Girl Scouts of the Philippines. The next year, the Gintong Ina Awards Foundation gave her the Celebrity Mother Award.

On November 30, 2007, the Spanish government gave Defensor Santiago the Grand Cross of the Order of Civil Merit. She was part of the Google Top 20 Most Influential Filipinas of 2010. She was inducted in the Philippine Judges' Hall of Fame in 2015 by the Philippine Judges Association and was branded a "Distinguished Icon of Legal Excellence and Public Service" by the University of the Philippines in September 2016.

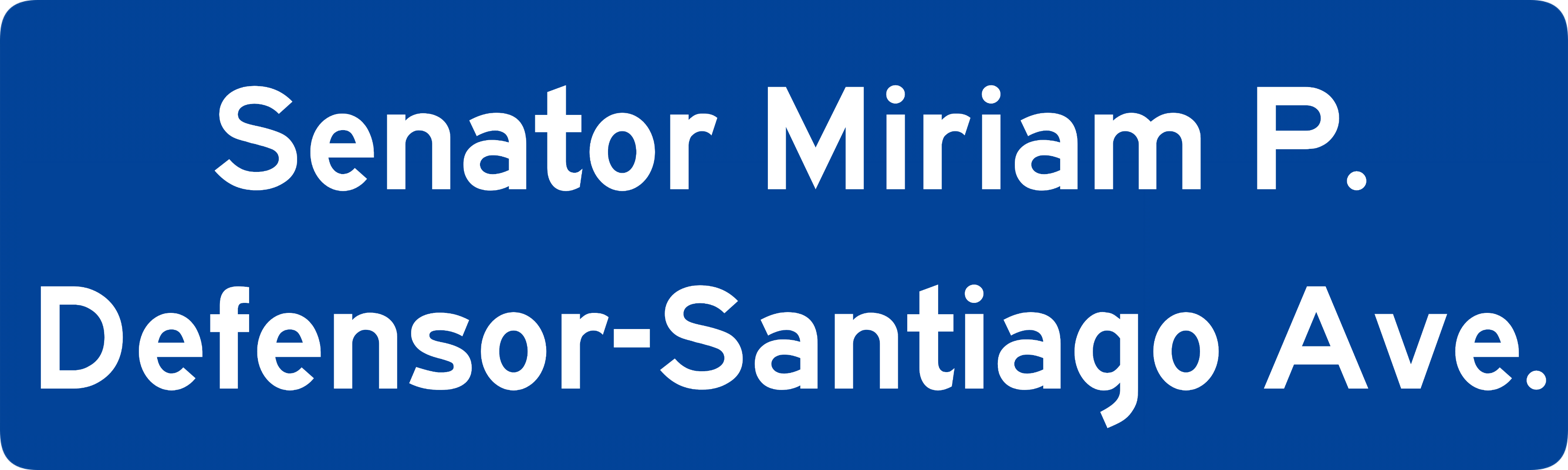
Senator Miriam P. Defensor Santiago Avenue street sign

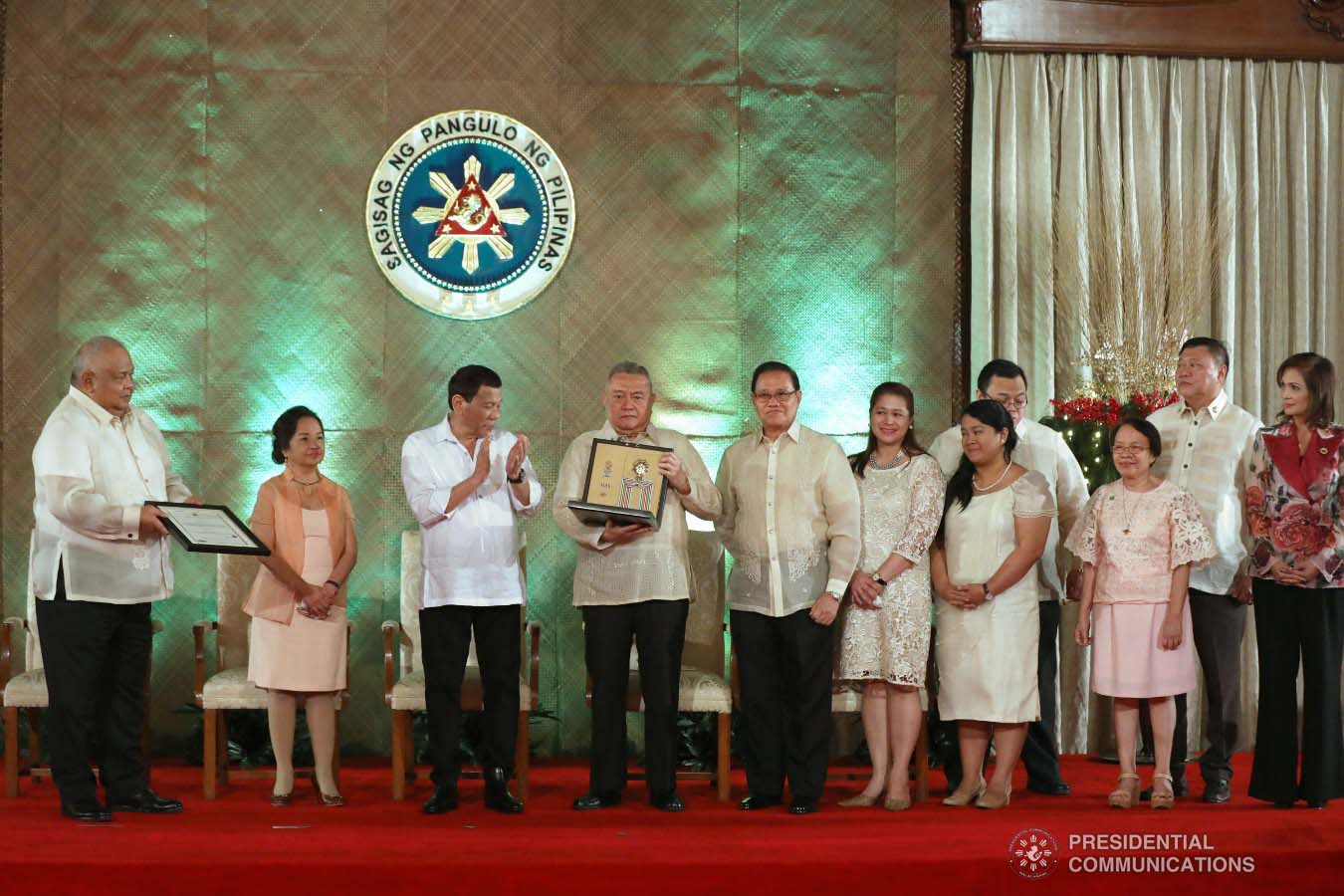
President Rodrigo Duterte (3rd from left) posthumously confers the Quezon Service Cross to Defensor Santiago at the Malacañan Palace on December 3, 2018. Accepting the award is Defensor Santiago's widower, Narciso Santiago Jr.

=== Posthumous ===
She was awarded, posthumously, the "PUP Online Personality of the Year Award" by the Polytechnic University of the Philippines in November 2016. In September 2017, Senator Grace Poe nominated Defensor Santiago to be awarded the Quezon Service Cross, the highest honor in the entire Republic, subject for approval by President Rodrigo Duterte. On the same month, Senator Sonny Angara followed suit by filing another resolution nominating Defensor Santiago to become a laureate of the Quezon Service Cross, just days before the first anniversary of her death on September 29. The president, through the Malacañang Palace, welcomed the proposal to bestow the award to Defensor Santiago once both houses of Congress have ratified the document conferring such award. On December 5, 2017, the president officially nominated Defensor Santiago for the award. On December 11, 2017, the Senate approved the bestowing of the award to Defensor Santiago. On February 20, 2018, the House of Representatives also approved the bestowing of the award to her. On December 3, 2018, the Quezon Service Cross was officially posthumously conferred upon Santiago, making her the sixth recipient and first and only woman to be included in the national award. On October 12, 2023, Republic Act No. 11963 was enacted to jointly rename Agham Road and BIR Road in Triangle Park, Quezon City as Senator Miriam P. Defensor Santiago Avenue in her honor.

Defensor Santiago was known as the Dragon Lady, the Platinum Lady, the Incorruptible Lady, the Impregnable Lady, Feisty Senator, The Doctor of All Laws, the Omniscient Woman and most popularly, the Iron Lady of Asia. She is colloquially known in Philippine pop culture as simply Miriam or MDS, and is cited for her dedication to public service in the Philippine government.

== Political positions ==
Defensor Santiago was not in favor of federalism but was in favor of amending the Constitution of the Philippines. Defensor Santiago publicly advocated for the passage of a divorce law in the Philippines. Defensor-Santiago took a critical perspective of abortion and supported maintaining laws against it. She was a strong supporter of the Philippines' Reproductive Health Law and supported the passage of the SOGIE Equality Bill. She was the first senator in Philippine history to push for the bill's legislation, filing it repeatedly since 2000. Defensor Santiago favored the death penalty but limited it to heinous crimes. Defensor Santiago vehemently opposed mining causing an interview conducted by Haribon Foundation during the 2016 Presidential campaign voting her as the "greenest" of all of the candidates.

== Electoral history ==
Electoral history of Miriam Defensor Santiago
Year	Office	Party	Votes received				Result
Year	Office	Party	Total	%	P.	Swing	Result
1992	President of the Philippines	PRP	4,468,173	19.72%	2nd	—N/a	Lost
1998	President of the Philippines	PRP	797,206	2.96%	7th	-16.76	Lost
2016	President of the Philippines	PRP	1,455,532	3.42%	5th	+0.46	Lost
1995	Senator of the Philippines	PRP	9,497,231	36.90%	6th	—N/a	Won
2001	Senator of the Philippines	PRP	9,622,742	32.65%	15th	-4.25	Lost
2004	Senator of the Philippines	PRP	12,187,401	34.32%	7th	+1.67	Won
2010	Senator of the Philippines	PRP	17,344,742	45.47%	3rd	+11.15	Won

== Writings ==
Defensor Santiago wrote at least 30 books, many of which are about law and social sciences. Among her works is the Code Annotated Series Project 2000, a series of books about laws passed by the Philippine Congress and Supreme Court decisions. The Code Annotated Series is the main part of Defensor Santiago's Legal Outreach Program. These were published as the 2015 edition of her Code Annotated Series, by Rex Bookstore. The doctoral dissertation she wrote for the University of Michigan was published as a book: Political Offences in International Law. She wrote two autobiographies, Inventing Myself and Cutting Edge: The Politics of Reform in the Philippines, the latter being praised by UK Prime Minister Margaret Thatcher. She published a joke book in 2014, Stupid is Forever, a collection of jokes, comebacks, one-liners, and pick-up lines she used in speeches. A sequel, titled Stupid is Forevermore, was published a year later. Both books were published by ABS-CBN Publishing. The former was named the best-selling book of 2014, selling about 110,000 copies in one month.

== Personal life ==
Defensor Santiago grew up in a household with both parents having higher educational attainments. She was married to Narciso "Jun" Santiago Jr., with whom she had two sons: one of her sons, Alexander, committed suicide in 2003. She and her husband renewed their wedding vows on their 40th wedding anniversary in 2011. She has close relationships with actress and visual artist, Heart Evangelista, who she has mentored. Defensor Santiago was featured in an episode of ABS-CBN's drama anthology Maalaala Mo Kaya in 2016. That same year, GMA Network's television drama anthology Wagas featured the story of Defensor Santiago and her husband Narciso, where she was played by Heart Evangelista.

=== Religious views ===
In general, Defensor Santiago had a complex relationship with religion, at times affirming her membership in the Catholic Church while at other times heavily criticizing and even entertaining the nonexistence of the Christian god. In 2012, she cited Ecclesiastes as her favorite book in the Bible and had once considered becoming a nun. In an interview with Esquire years after the death of her son who committed suicide, she said she was "clueless" about God, although the only thing she knew was that "God is inscrutable". In a 2012 interview, she openly questioned how an all-loving God could allow suffering and even said that possibly “God does not exist,” but later, in 2013 during an interview with Karen Davila, expressed a more nuanced perspective in which she believed in the existence of a higher intelligence, possibly responsible for the Big Bang and the creation of multiple universes, which some people might call God.

== See also ==
- Youth Reform Movement
