= Anna Liza Logan =

Filipino Chief Presidential Legal Counsel (born 1974)

10th Chief Presidential Legal Counsel
- Incumbent
- Assumed office December 16, 2025
- President: Bongbong Marcos
- Preceded by: Juan Ponce Enrile

Deputy Executive Secretary for Legal Affairs
- In office October 11, 2022 – December 16, 2025

Personal details
- Born: Anna Liza Gonzalez; August 10, 1974 (age 52) Manila, Philippines
- Party: Independent
- Spouse: Michael Logan
- Education: San Beda University (LLB)
- Profession: Lawyer and civil servant

Anna Liza Gonzalez–Logan (born August 10, 1974) is a Filipino lawyer and civil servant who has served as Chief Presidential Legal Counsel since December 16, 2025, under President Bongbong Marcos, replacing Juan Ponce Enrile who died during his tenure.

== Education ==
Logan obtained her law degree from San Beda University and was admitted to the Philippine Bar in 1998.

== Early career ==
Logan was an associate at the law firm Agabin Verzola Hermoso Layaoen & De Castro, whose partners include Pacifico Agabin, counsel for impeached and convicted President Joseph Estrada. She later became a junior partner at Marcos Ochoa Serapio and Tan (MOST), the now-defunct law firm of First Lady Liza Araneta Marcos. In 2019, Logan co-founded Logan Masukat Ronulo Huang Law Office. She also served on the board of directors of the Philippine National Railroad and previously held the position of Deputy Executive Secretary for Legal Affairs in the Office of the President.

== Ombudsman application ==
In 2025, Logan applied for the position of Ombudsman. Regarding Statement of Assets, Liabilities and Net Worth (SALN) transparency, Logan stated that if chosen, she would abandon the memorandum issued by former Ombudsman Samuel Martires that restricted access to SALNs, noting that it does not promote transparency. On lifestyle checks, Logan indicated it had been a program of the Ombudsman previously and stated she would continue it if appointed. However, she emphasized that prior to relaunching it, she would ensure guidelines are in place and that personnel in the Ombudsman's office receive proper training to conduct these checks.

== Personal life ==
Logan is married to Michael Logan.

Legal offices
Preceded by Juan Ponce Enrile	Chief Presidential Legal Counsel; 2025–present	Incumbent
Order of precedence
Preceded by Darlene Berberabe as Solicitor-General	Order of Precedence of the Philippines as Chief Presidential Legal Counsel	Succeeded by Romando Artes; Acting as Chairman of the Metropolitan Manila Development Authority
