= Juan Ponce Enrile =

President of the Senate of the Philippines from 2008 to 2013

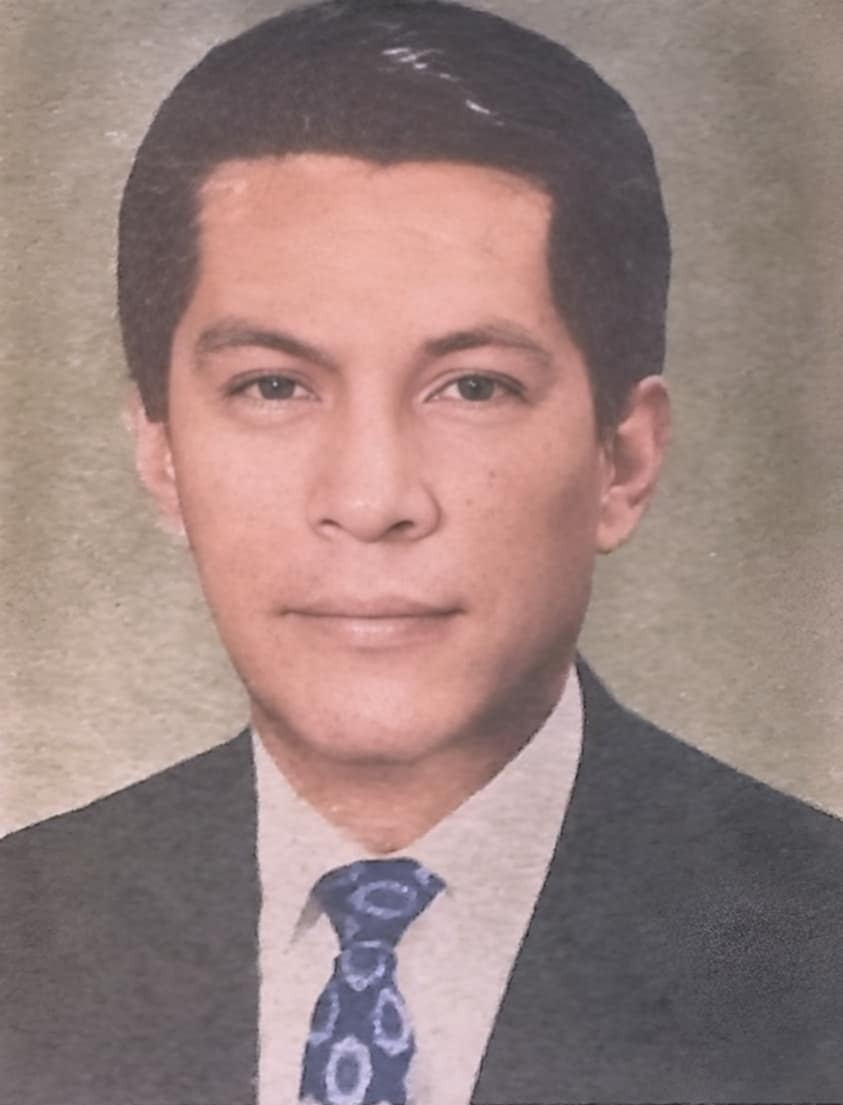
- Official portrait, undated

26th President of the Senate of the Philippines
- In office November 17, 2008 – June 5, 2013
- Preceded by: Manny Villar
- Succeeded by: Jinggoy Estrada (Acting)

9th Chief Presidential Legal Counsel
- In office June 30, 2022 – November 13, 2025
- President: Bongbong Marcos
- Preceded by: Jesus Melchor Quitain
- Succeeded by: Anna Liza Logan

Senate Minority Leader
- In office August 24, 2015 – June 30, 2016
- Preceded by: Tito Sotto (Acting)
- Succeeded by: Ralph Recto
- In office July 22, 2013 – July 28, 2014
- Preceded by: Alan Peter Cayetano
- Succeeded by: Tito Sotto (Acting)
- In office August 17, 1987 – January 18, 1992
- Preceded by: Joseph Estrada
- Succeeded by: Wigberto Tañada

Senator of the Philippines
- In office June 30, 2004 – June 30, 2016
- In office June 30, 1995 – June 30, 2001
- In office August 15, 1987 – June 30, 1992

Member of the House of Representatives from Cagayan's 1st district
- In office June 30, 1992 – June 30, 1995
- Preceded by: Domingo A. Tuzon
- Succeeded by: Patricio T. Antonio

Member of the Regular Batasang Pambansa from Cagayan
- In office June 30, 1984 – March 25, 1986

Member of the Interim Batasang Pambansa from Region II
- In office June 12, 1978 – June 5, 1984

15th Minister of National Defense
- In office January 4, 1972 – November 23, 1986
- President: Ferdinand Marcos; Corazon Aquino
- Preceded by: Ferdinand Marcos
- Succeeded by: Rafael Ileto
- In office February 9, 1970 – August 27, 1971
- President: Ferdinand Marcos
- Preceded by: Ernesto Mata
- Succeeded by: Ferdinand Marcos

36th Secretary of Justice
- In office December 17, 1968 – February 7, 1970
- President: Ferdinand Marcos
- Preceded by: Claudio Teehankee Sr.
- Succeeded by: Felix Makasiar

Undersecretary of Finance
- In office January 1, 1966 – December 17, 1968
- President: Ferdinand Marcos

Commissioner of the Bureau of Customs
- In office 1966–1968
- President: Ferdinand Marcos
- Preceded by: Jacinto T. Gavino
- Succeeded by: Rolando G. Geotina

Personal details
- Born: Juanito Furagganan; February 14, 1924 (Note: Based on official records, Enrile was born on February 14, 1924. However, records from the Aglipayan Church in Cagayan showed that Enrile was born on June 22, 1922, but this is not officially recognized.) Gonzaga, Cagayan, Philippine Islands
- Died: November 13, 2025 (aged 101) Dasmariñas, Makati, Metro Manila, Philippines
- Resting place: Libingan ng mga Bayani, Taguig, Metro Manila
- Party: PMP (2004–2025)
- Other political affiliations: LDP (2001–2004); Independent (1995–2001); KBL (1978–1987); Nacionalista (1965–1978; 1987–1995)
- Spouse: Cristina Castañer (m. 1957)
- Children: 2, including Jack
- Relatives: Armida Siguion-Reyna (half-sister)
- Education: Ateneo de Manila University (AA); University of the Philippines Diliman (LL.B); Harvard University (LL.M)
- Occupation: Politician
- Profession: Lawyer
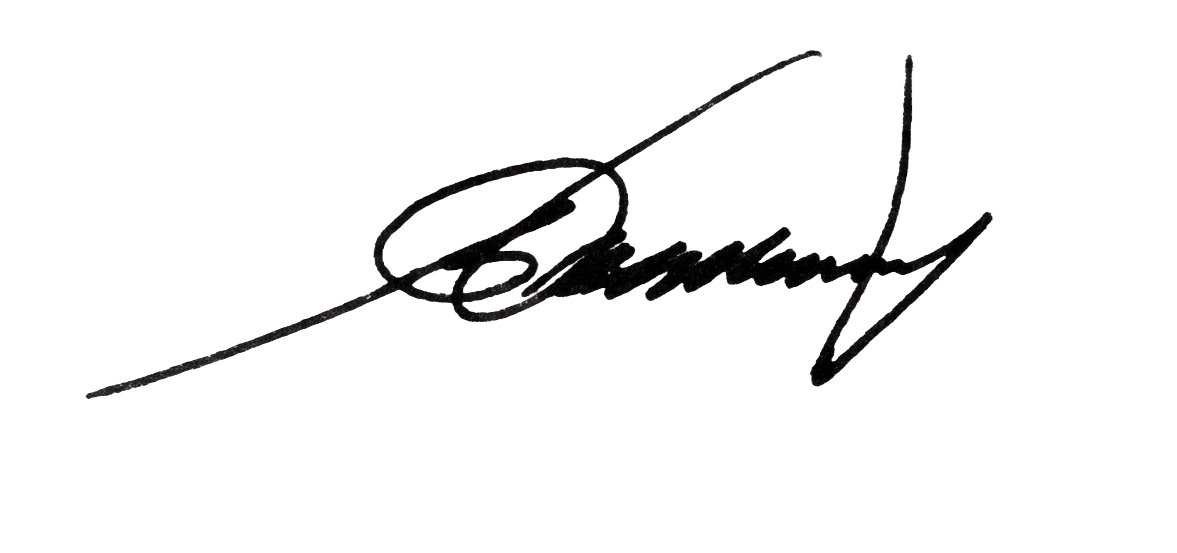
- Signature

Juan Furagganan Ponce Enrile Sr. CLH (born Juanito Furagganan; February 14, 1924 – November 13, 2025), also referred to by his initials JPE, was a Filipino politician and lawyer, who served as 26th President of the Senate of the Philippines from 2008 until his resignation in 2013. Enrile was one of the longest-serving Filipino politicians in history, and one of the few to reach the age of 100. He was known for his role in the administration of Philippine president Ferdinand Marcos; his role in the failed coup that helped hasten the 1986 People Power Revolution and the ouster of Marcos; and his tenure in the Philippine legislature in the years after the revolution. Enrile also participated in rallies supporting ousted president Joseph Estrada in April 2001 that preceded the May 1 riots near Malacañang Palace. Enrile served four terms in the Senate, in a total of twenty-two years and three-hundred twenty days, one of the longest-tenures in the history of the upper chamber. In 2022, at the age of 98, he returned to government office as the Chief Presidential Legal Counsel in the administration of President Bongbong Marcos, serving until his death in 2025.

Enrile was a protégé of President Ferdinand Marcos who served as Justice Secretary and Defense Minister during the Marcos administration. Enrile played a key role in the planning and documentary legwork for martial law, and was in charge of the Philippine Military during its implementation. His other roles during this period included Presidency of the Philippine Coconut Authority through which he gained control of the copra industry together with Danding Cojuangco, and being the general put in charge of logging in the Philippines under martial law—a period during which lumber exports were so extensive that the forest cover of the Philippines shrank until only 8% remained. By the 1980s, however, rising factionalism in the Marcos administration led to a reduction in Enrile's influence within the administration.

Enrile and the Reform the Armed Forces Movement organized a plot to overthrow Marcos in February 1986, but they were discovered. Deciding to stage a last stand in Camp Aguinaldo, Enrile sought support from other units of the Armed Forces of the Philippines and received it from Philippine Constabulary General Fidel Ramos in nearby Camp Crame, who joined Enrile in withdrawing support for Marcos in February 1986. Marcos moved to put down the dissenters in Camps Aguinaldo and Crame, but civilians who were already preparing mass protests in response to electoral fraud during the 1986 Philippine presidential election went en masse to Epifanio de los Santos Avenue near Enrile and Ramos's forces, and prevented Marcos from assaulting the coup organizers. This mass movement of citizens to protect Enrile and Ramos was one of the key moments of the 1986 People Power Revolution which drove Marcos out of power and into exile. After 1986, Enrile continued on as a politician. He gained the 24th Senate seat in a contested 1987 election win against Bobbit Sanchez, which involved the Supreme Court decision Sanchez vs. Comelec to dismiss the recount petition, and benefited from the "dagdag-bawas" scam in the 1995 Senate election.

== Early life and education ==
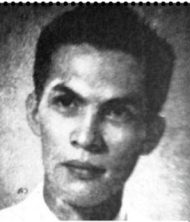
Enrile's high school graduation in 1948

Enrile was born as Juanito Furagganan on February 14, 1924, in Gonzaga, Cagayan, based on official records, to Petra Furagganan, the stepdaughter of a poor fisherman. He was born out of wedlock, as his father, the Spanish mestizo lawyer and influential provincial politician Alfonso Ponce Enrile, was already married. His mother later married a fisherman. Records from the Philippine Independent Church (Aglipayan) in Cagayan also showed that Enrile was born on June 22, 1922, as revealed by his son Jack in 2025. At the time of his birth, Alfonso served as a representative from the 1st district of Cagayan. He was baptized into the Aglipayan church as Juanito Furagganan. He lived a life of poverty with his mother and six half-siblings by a river in Barrio Mission (now Barangay Casitan), Gonzaga, Cagayan. Starting at age 7, he worked for his aunt Consorcia Calasan, his mother's distant cousin also from Gonzaga, as a houseboy and later as a chef to support his schooling. He was expelled from school after being caught in a love triangle. This perceived injustice over his expulsion led him to abandon his initial dream of becoming an engineer and instead aimed to become a lawyer. His schooling was disrupted once again due to the outbreak of World War II.

During the Japanese occupation of the Philippines, the teenage Enrile joined the guerilla movement against Imperial Japan. He converted to Roman Catholicism at age 20. At age 21, he was reunited with his father in Manila and began staying with his second family in Malabon, Rizal. There, he met his three half-siblings, including Armida Siguion-Reyna. He eventually continued his schooling, taking his secondary education at St. James Academy in Malabon. His father took legal steps in changing his name to Juan Ponce Enrile, the name that he would use for his pre-law enrollment.

He graduated cum laude in 1949 with an Associate of Arts degree from the Ateneo de Manila. Afterward, he attended the University of the Philippines College of Law and graduated cum laude with a Bachelor of Laws degree. While in law school, he joined the Sigma Rho fraternity, the oldest law-based fraternity in Asia with other Senate colleagues such as Franklin Drilon and father and son duo Edgardo Angara and Sonny Angara, among many others. Upon graduation, he was elected to the Pi Gamma Mu and Phi Kappa Phi international honor societies. He scored 11th in the 1953 bar examinations with a 91.72% rating and a perfect score in mercantile law. As a scholar at Harvard Law School, he earned a Master of Laws degree with specialized training in international tax law.

== Early career ==
Enrile taught law at the Far Eastern University and practiced law in his father's law firm before taking responsibility for then-Senator Ferdinand Marcos' personal legal affairs in 1964, especially during the latter's term as Senate President. After Marcos was elected president in 1965, he became part of his inner circle. His success as a lawyer allowed him to achieve financial security, initially enabling him to build a home for his family in the Phil-am Life Subdivision in Quezon City. They subsequently relocated to Urdaneta Village and later to Dasmariñas Village, both in Makati.

== Career in the Marcos Sr. cabinet ==
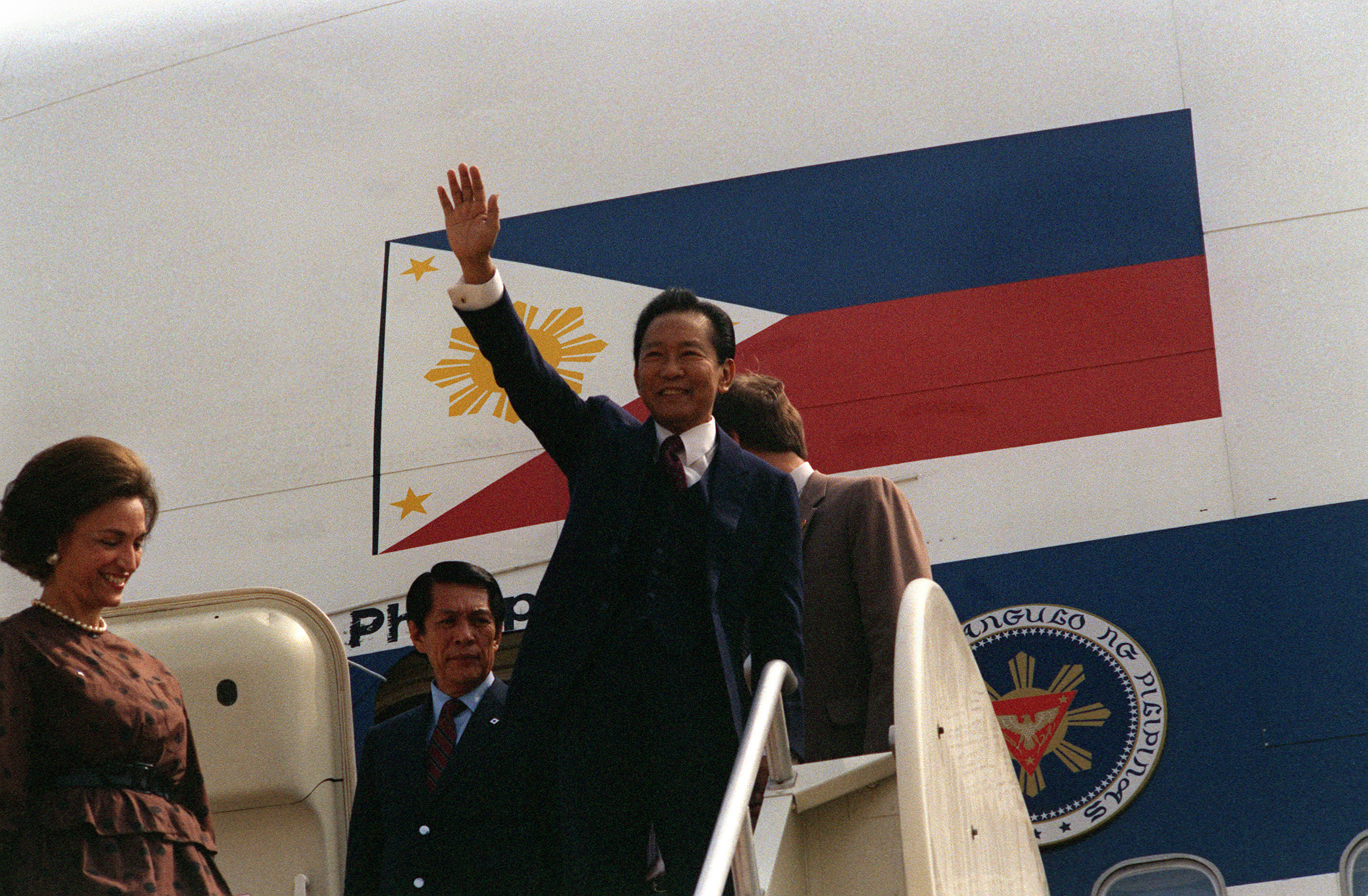
Defense Minister Juan Ponce Enrile with President Ferdinand Marcos boarding to a Philippine Airlines Boeing 747-200 Presidential Flight

=== Before martial law ===
Enrile, as did Ferdinand Marcos, hailed from the northern Philippines, a region that had become Marcos's recruiting ground for key political and military leaders. Enrile was with Marcos since his election in 1965.

From 1966 to 1968, he was the Undersecretary and sometime Acting Secretary of the Department of Finance. He concurrently became acting Insurance Commissioner and Commissioner of the Bureau of Customs. From 1968 to 1970, he was the Secretary of Justice. Enrile later spoke about social justice and equality, reflecting wider debates on legal reform in the country.

The Department of National Defense would expand its power when Marcos assumed the presidency in 1965. Marcos appointed Enrile as his Secretary of National Defense on February 9, 1970, a position Enrile held until he resigned on August 27, 1971, to run for Senator. However, he failed to secure one of the eight Senate seats in the 1971 election, finishing 12th with 3,044,461 votes. He was re-appointed Defense Secretary by Marcos in 1972.

=== Martial law ===
==== Preparations for the declaration of martial law ====
From the beginning of Marcos's period in government, Enrile was one of the few that the Philippine leader trusted, and was seen by many as Marcos's protégé. For almost the entire period of martial law, Enrile served officially as the martial law administrator as he was in charge of all the armed forces' services during that time. Furthermore, as early as Marcos's planning and preparation for the declaration of martial law, Enrile was involved. In his memoir, Enrile recalled Marcos's careful preparations. He noted that as early as December 1969, Marcos instructed him to study the 1935 Constitution, specifically the powers of the President as Commander-in-Chief. Marcos had already foreseen a rise in violence and chaos in the country and wanted to know the exact extent of his powers.

At the end of January of the following year, Enrile, with help from Efren Plana and Minerva Gonzaga Reyes, submitted the only copy of the report regarding the detailed nature and extent of martial law to Marcos. Soon after, Marcos allegedly ordered Enrile to prepare all documents necessary for the implementation of Martial Law in the Philippines. In August 1972, Marcos once again met with Enrile and a few of his other most trusted commanders to discuss tentative dates for the declaration. By September 23, 1972, Marcos appeared on television to announce that he had placed the entire country under martial law as of 9 p.m. via Proclamation No. 1081 which, as historians claimed, he signed on September 21, 1972.

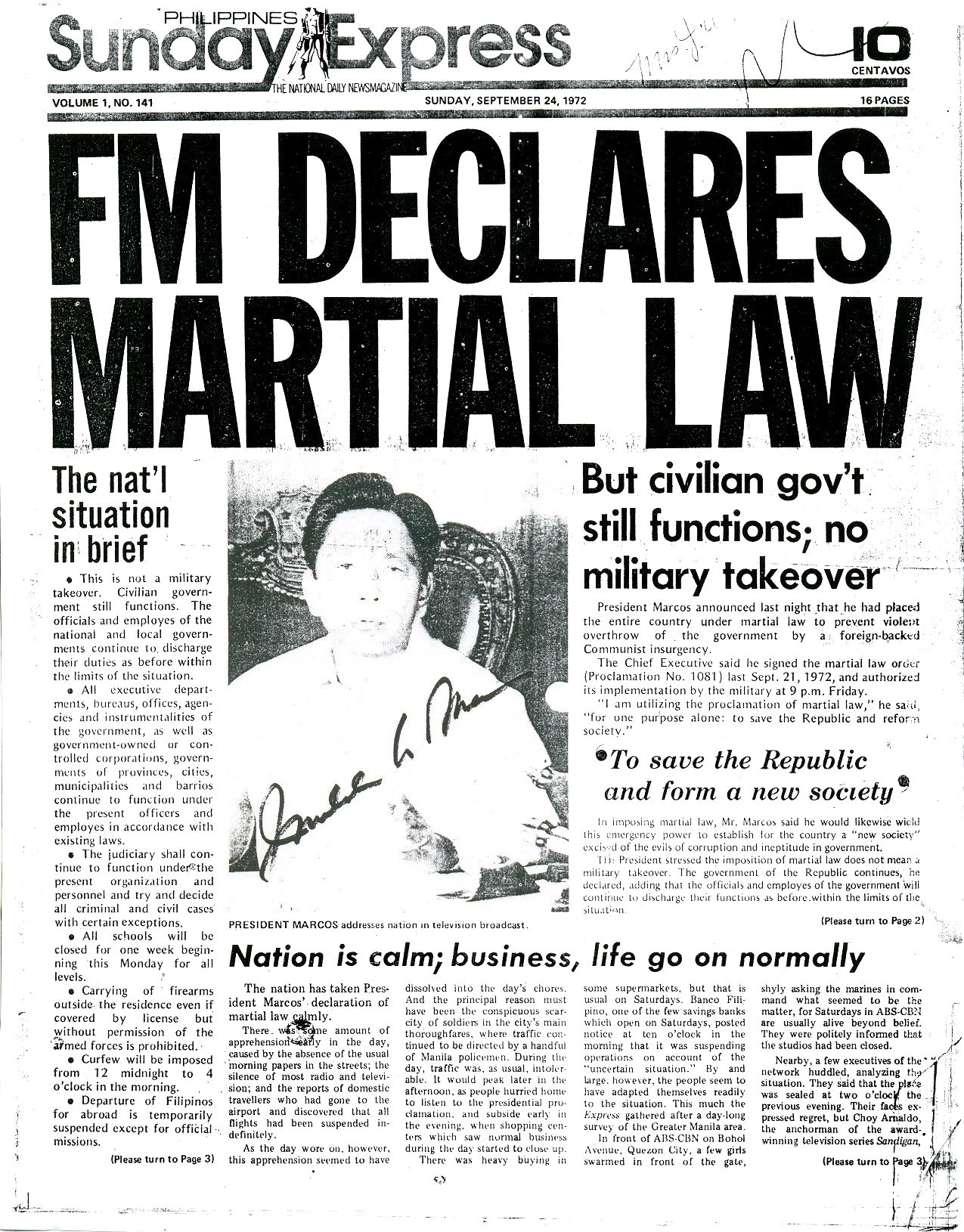
"FM Declares Martial Law"—the headline of the September 24, 1972 issue of the Sunday Express, which was the Sunday edition of the Philippines Daily Express. The Daily Express was the only newspaper allowed to circulate upon the declaration of martial law.

==== Alleged September 22, 1972 ambush ====
One of Marcos's justifications for the declaration of martial law that year was terrorism. He cited the alleged ambush attack on Enrile's white Mercedes-Benz sedan on September 22, 1972, as a pretext for martial law. At the time, many people doubted that the attack took place. Marcos, in his diary entry for September 1972, wrote that Enrile had been ambushed near Wack-Wack that night. He said .."it was a good thing he was riding in his security car as a protective measure... This makes the martial law proclamation a necessity."

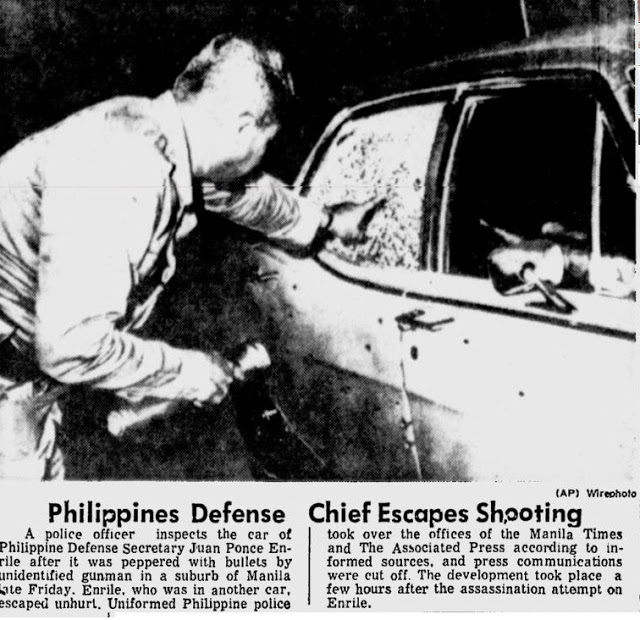
Juan Ponce Enrile's bullet-riddled car

The doubts surrounding the alleged ambush were further confirmed in a press conference on February 23, 1986, when then Lieutenant General Fidel Ramos and Enrile admitted that the attack was staged to justify the declaration of martial law. Both radio and television media covered this and millions of Filipinos witnessed the said confession. Furthermore, in several interviews, Enrile was reported as indeed confirming that the attempted assassination was faked to justify the declaration of martial law. Conflicting accounts arise in his book, Juan Ponce Enrile: A Memoir. In the said book, Enrile accused his political opponents of spreading rumors of the ambush being staged despite having already admitted several times that the attempted assassination was indeed fake.

==== Martial law administration role ====
Despite the later controversy, at the time, Enrile remained one of Marcos's most loyal allies. In 1973, under the new modified parliamentary system then in place under the country's new constitution under martial law, Enrile's title became Defense Minister. Enrile focused his efforts on a broad review of defense policies and on dealing with pressing social unrest. The abolition of civilian institutions such as Congress, the weakening of the judiciary, and the outlawing of political parties, left the military as the only other instrumentality of the national government outside of the Presidency.

==== Role in logging, and in the Coconut Authority ====
According to the National Historical Commission of the Philippines, Enrile was also appointed as the middleman for logging in the Philippines during martial law. He was tasked by Marcos to give certificates to logging companies, which eventually led to one of Asia's most devastating environmental disasters. During that time, the forest cover of the Philippines shrank until only 8% remained. Enrile also owned numerous logging companies such as Ameco in Bukidnon, Dolores Timber in Samar, San Jose Timber in Northern Samar, Kasilagan Softwood Development Corp in Butuan, Eurasia Match in Cebu, Pan Oriental which operates in Cebu and Butuan, Palawan-Apitong Corp in Palawan, and Royal Match. He also invested heavily in a rubber plantation in Basilan. A share of Marcos's ill-gotten wealth was siphoned into those companies.

==== Supreme Court dismissal of coco levy case vs Enrile ====
Enrile was also appointed by Marcos as the President of the Philippine Coconut Authority, where he established control of the copra industry together with Danding Cojuangco. The two were accused of corruption. Enrile denied the allegations and even filed a libel case against a newspaper over claims that he benefited from the coco levy funds.

The Supreme Court of the Philippines dismissed the coco levy–related graft case against Juan Ponce Enrile and several others primarily on procedural and evidentiary grounds rather than a full determination of guilt or innocence. The Court found that there were significant legal issues affecting the case, including questions about the sufficiency of the evidence presented and the long delay in pursuing the charges, which undermined the accused’s constitutional right to a speedy disposition of cases. Because of these factors, the case could not proceed to trial or conviction, leading to its dismissal. This means the ruling effectively cleared Enrile from criminal liability in that particular case, although it did not serve as a definitive historical judgment on the broader controversy surrounding the coco levy funds.

==== Sandiganbayan / later dismissals of coco levy cases ====
The Sandiganbayan has, in several instances, dismissed civil cases tied to the coco levy funds involving figures such as Juan Ponce Enrile, largely on procedural grounds rather than a conclusive ruling on the merits of the allegations. A key reason cited in these dismissals was “inordinate delay,” meaning the cases had remained unresolved for decades, which the court found to be a violation of the defendants’ constitutional right to the speedy disposition of cases. In some rulings, the court also pointed to weaknesses in how the claims were pursued or documented over time. As a result, the cases were terminated without a full trial, effectively relieving the defendants of legal liability in those specific proceedings, though the decisions did not settle the broader historical and political debate over accountability for the coco levy funds.

==== Reduced influence ====
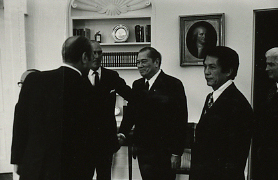
Defense Secretary Enrile (second from right) and Philippine Ambassador to the U.S. Eduardo Romualdez (center) meeting U.S. President Gerald Ford at the White House in 1976.

With rising factionalism in the Marcos administration towards its latter years, Enrile's influence began to be reduced. On November 28, 1978, Marcos issued the Letter of Instruction no. 776, which stated that "No changes of assignment of senior officers including provincial commanders, brigade commanders, division commanders, and special unit commanders shall be made without clearance from the president."

By the 1980s, Marcos began to more aggressively bypass Enrile's authority. He clipped the powers of the Minister of National Defense and the Chief of Staff over the Armed Forces of the Philippines. Enrile started to break away from the Marcos dictatorship. He began aligning himself with dissident elements in the army, particularly the Reform the Armed Forces Movement (RAM) - which was then headed by his aide-de-camp, Lieutenant Colonel Gregorio Honasan. In a 1986 press conference, Enrile was quoted as having said:

As far back as 1982, we have been getting persistent reports that there were efforts to eliminate us ... and it was [at] that point that we decided to organize a group to protect ourselves ... now known as the AFP Reform Movement.

== Role in aborted coup and the People Power Revolution ==
Under pressure from the U.S. government, Marcos agreed to hold the 1986 Philippine presidential election on February 7, 1986. Despite widespread allegations of fraud, which included a protest walkout by election tabulators, Marcos was proclaimed the winner against his opponent Corazon Aquino on February 15. Aquino protested and declared victory, launching a civil disobedience campaign at a massive rally in Luneta on February 16, 1986, and then going to Cebu to organize more mass protests.

Officers from the Reform the Armed Forces Movement, with Enrile's support, had been planning to launch a coup d'état against Marcos since 1985, which they delayed when Marcos announced the 1986 election. Enrile and the RAM decided to launch the coup against Marcos in February 1986 in order to take advantage of the political instability in the wake of the controversial election. However, this RAM coup d'état failed when it was discovered by Ver in the early morning hours of February 22, 1986 - a day before it was supposed to be implemented.

At 2:00 pm on February 22, 1986, Enrile asked for the support of then Lieutenant General Fidel Ramos, the head of the Philippine Constabulary and concurrent vice-chief of staff of the armed forces, who agreed to join Enrile. With the plot already uncovered by Marcos, Enrile decided to encamp at Camp Aguinaldo in Quezon City, across Epifanio de los Santos Avenue from Ramos' headquarters in Camp Crame. With their forces trapped in the two camps 5 PM on February 22, Enrile called Cardinal Jaime Sin, Manila Archbishop, asking for support. Enrile was quoted as having told Cardinal Sin:

I will be dead within one hour. I don't want to die... If it is possible, do something. I'd still like to live.

Shortly after 10 pm a few hours later, Cardinal Sin went on the air through Radio Veritas to appeal to Filipinos in the area to support Enrile and Ramos by going to the section of Epifanio de Los Santos Avenue (EDSA) between the two camps, giving the rebels emotional support and supplies. Already prepared for protests linked to Aquino's civil disobedience campaign, People began gathering at EDSA, and this was the beginning of the citizens' revolt that became known as the People Power Revolution.

For the next three days, they continued their rally in EDSA now containing two million people in support. The growing number encouraged many more leaders to support the movement against Marcos. Enrile stated:

It was funny ... We in the defense and military organizations who should be protecting the people were being protected by them.

Enrile wanted Corazon Aquino to hold her inauguration as new president in Camp Crame, but Aquino refused, emphasizing that the People Power Revolution was a civilian victory by the Filipino people, not by a rebel military faction. She held her inauguration on February 25, 1986, at the nearby Club Filipino instead, with Enrile and Ramos invited only as guests. The People Power Revolution forced Marcos out of power on February 25, 1986, and Marcos, along with his family, some servants, and millions of dollars in stocks, jewelry, and cash, flew to exile in Hawaii on U.S. Government-provided DC-9 Medivac and C-141B planes.

== Career in the Aquino Cabinet ==
=== Appointment and disagreements ===
The quick development of events in the wake of the People Power Revolution prevented both Enrile's original plan of forming a ruling junta, and his backup plan of forming a coalition government with him and Corazon Aquino as co-equal partners. So he accepted Aquino as president, and accepted the post of Secretary of National Defense, believing that the politically and militarily inexperienced president would rely on him for advice. However, Aquino did not rely on Enrile's advice as much as he expected her to.

Enrile publicly took up an anticommunist persona, organizing rallies to publicly decry Aquino's ceasefires and peace talks with the Communist Party of the Philippines. This led to confrontations with numerous members of Aquino's coalition cabinet, but eased tensions between Enrile and Marcos loyalists.

Enrile's relations with the rest of the administration further soured when the newly created Presidential Commission on Good Government, led by Jovito Salonga, began a probe of Enrile's business transactions during the Marcos years.

Even though Marcos had been exiled, the Aquino administration continued to face challenges, particularly from forces loyal to Marcos, and from some members of the Reform the Armed Forces Movement which began to express dissatisfaction with her policies. This resulted in several coup d'état attempts from 1986 to 1990 which sought to oust Aquino from the presidency.

Enrile and Ramos were tasked with addressing the first of these coups, which was the July 1986 Manila Hotel Incident in which loyalist soldiers and officials briefly took over the Manila Hotel and declared their own government. The incident was resolved without violence and without much impact to the broader public, and the Aquino administration pursued a policy of maximum leniency towards the instigators.

Within Aquino's own "coalition cabinet", there was significant conflict, with Enrile and other rightwing cabinet members demanding that Aquino let go of cabinet members associated with the left, and to take a more hardline stance against the Communist Party of the Philippines and the left in general.

=== "God Save the Queen" plot and resignation ===
Enrile was then implicated in the God Save the Queen Plot that was to supposedly take place on November 11, 1986. The investigation of the coup done by the Fact-Finding Commission found Enrile and some members of the RAM as the primary instigators of the coup. After revealing the result of the investigation, Aquino forced Enrile to resign as Defense Secretary in November 1986 as she had lost confidence in him. Enrile was then replaced with Rafael Ileto.

== Congressional career ==
=== First Senate term ===
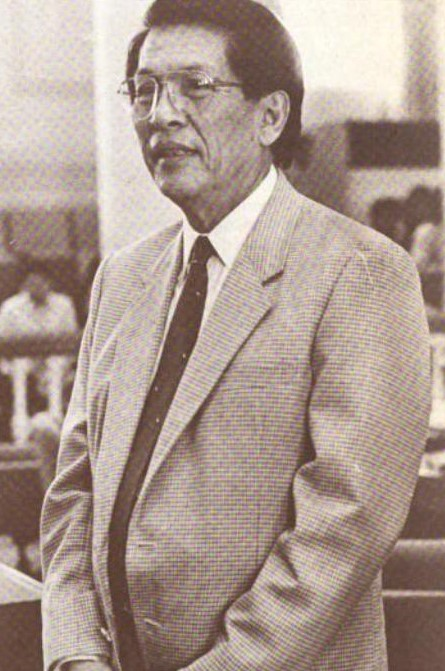
Enrile as a senator, photograph released by the Philippine Congress, c. 1988

In May 1987, Enrile won a seat in the 1987 election as one of two opposition members in the country's 24-member Senate (the other being Joseph Estrada), finishing 24th. He was unable to be proclaimed until August when the electoral protest filed by Augusto "Bobbit" Sanchez was dismissed. He formally assumed office on August 15, 1987. In later years, Enrile continued alleging that the Aquino government manipulated the vote count during the 1987 elections, which he called "Cory Magic".

In the same month Enrile assumed office as senator, an attempted coup against Aquino escalated and led to the destruction of the Armed Forces General Headquarters (AFPGHQ) in Camp Aguinaldo in Quezon City. He was detained in Camp Aguinaldo over suspicion of planning the coup with Lt. Col. Gregorio Honasan but was released days later for lack of evidence. Enrile later stated numerous recalls about the martial law era, of which all were flip-flops from his previous statements during his term as secretary of defense and during the ouster of Marcos. He was dubbed by then-President Corazon Aquino as Pambansang Balimbing (national political turncoat) for his contradicting statements and Dakilang Miron (great bystander) for his inconvenient bystander and opportunistic attitude.

=== Member of the House of Representatives ===
In 1992, before his term in the Senate had ended, Enrile predicted that he might lose the senatorial election or win, but only serve three years in office. He ran instead for the House of Representatives of the Philippines. He was elected and represented the First District of Cagayan.

=== Second to fourth senate terms ===
In 1995, Enrile ran in the Senate election as an independent candidate and was also a guest candidate under the Lakas–Laban coalition. He won as a senator after placing 11th among the 12 winning candidates, holding his Senate seat until 2001. In the years after the 1995 election, Enrile was revealed to have benefited from the "Dagdag-Bawas" scam that removed votes from other candidates such as Aquilino Pimentel Jr. and placed them under his name. Enrile, however, attempted to claim in 1996 that he was also a victim of the Dagdag-Bawas scam, challenging Pimentel to a one-on-one poll contest and suing him for his claims of election fraud during the Senate election.

During his term as senator, he ran as an independent candidate in the 1998 Philippine presidential election. He lost to then-Vice President Joseph Estrada.

On January 16, 2001, he was one of those who voted against the opening of the second envelope, which was later revealed to have contained the document that stated that businessman Jaime Dichaves was the owner of "Jose Velarde" bank account. That vote led to the second EDSA revolution that eventually ousted President Estrada. From April 30 to May 1, 2001, together with Miriam Defensor Santiago, Gregorio Honasan, Panfilo Lacson, and Vicente Sotto III, he led the EDSA III protests in support of Joseph Estrada. On May 1, 2001, the protesters attempted to storm Malacañang Palace. In May 2001 he was indicted by the military for alleged involvement in the siege but was released a day later. He ran for reelection as part of the Puwersa ng Masa coalition. Due to the issues that haunted him over the incident, he lost the election.

In the 2004 election, he made a comeback bid for the Senate under the Koalisyon ng Nagkakaisang Pilipino (KNP) banner. He actively opposed the imposition of the Purchased Power Adjustment (PPA) on consumers' electric bills. Due to his exposé of the PPA and the Supreme Court decision in favor of a refund on electric bills, the public responded positively and elected him. He thus became a senator in three non-consecutive terms. He was re-elected as a senator in the 2010 elections. At 86, he became the oldest senator of the 15th Congress of the Philippines.

== Senate Presidency ==
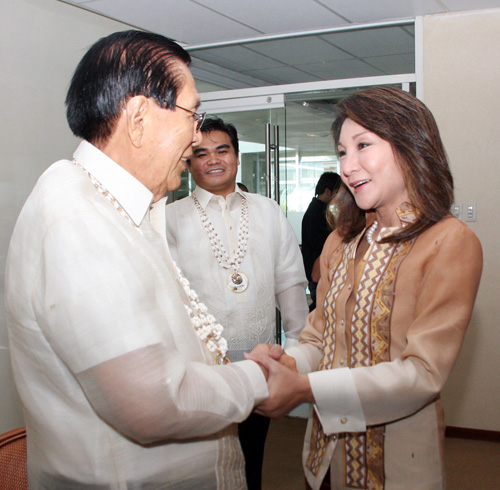
Enrile meets former Cebu Governor Gwen Garcia

=== Election ===
On November 17, 2008, Senate President Manuel Villar resigned due to a lack of support, and Enrile succeeded him the same day. Enrile was nominated by Panfilo Lacson; 14 senators supported the nomination and five abstained.

=== Maguindanao martial law ===
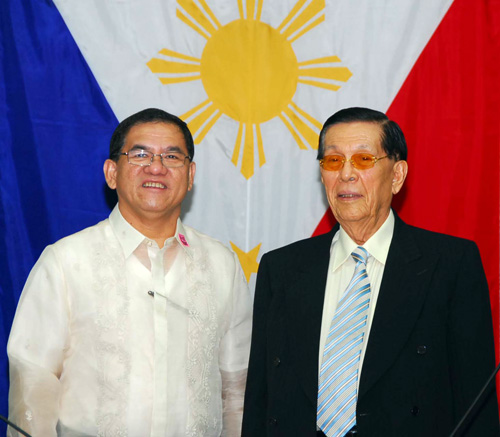
Secretary Marianito Roque (left) and Enrile (right)

In December 2009, the Congress used Proclamation No. 1959 of the Arroyo administration, declaring a state of martial law and suspending the privilege of the writ of habeas corpus in the province of Maguindanao, while in May 2010, Congress convened to constitute itself as the national board to canvass the votes for president and vice president, and proclaim the winners.

=== Re-election as Senate President ===
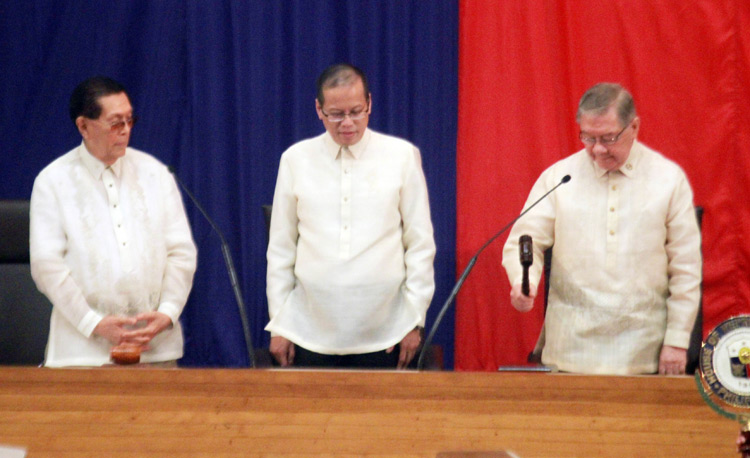
Enrile (left) during President Benigno Aquino III's first SONA in 2010

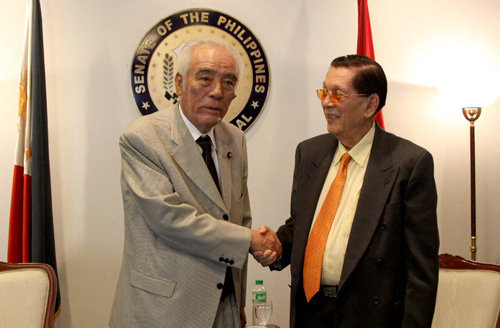
Enrile with Hajime Ishii (left) on May 4, 2011

Enrile was re-elected to a fourth term in the 2010 Senate election, placing fifth among the 12 winning candidates. On July 26, 2010, he was re-elected President of the Senate. Enrile committed himself to "discharge my duties and responsibilities with honor, with total devotion to our institution, and with fairness to all members. No partisan consideration will blur or color the treatment of any member of the Senate. We are all Senators elected by the people to serve them with the dedication to their interest and well-being and devotion to our responsibilities." Furthermore, in his acceptance speech, he enjoined his colleagues to "uphold the independence and integrity of this Senate, without abandoning our duty to cooperate with the other departments of the government to achieve what is good for our people."

=== Corona's impeachment, various feuds, and controversies ===
In early 2012, Enrile was the presiding officer of the impeachment of Chief Justice Renato Corona. He was one of the 20 Senators who voted guilty for the impeachment. In September 2012, he started a feud with Antonio Trillanes when he asked Trillanes why he secretly visited Beijing to talk about the Philippines and the Spratly Islands dispute on Spratlys and the Scarborough Shoal. Trillanes said that his visit to China was authorized by the Palace. He also alleged that Enrile was being pushed by former President Gloria Macapagal Arroyo to pass a bill splitting the province of Camarines Sur into two but Enrile denied the allegation.

In late 2012, Enrile also started a feud with Miriam Defensor Santiago when Santiago authored the Responsible Parenthood and Reproductive Health Act of 2012 with Pia Cayetano, which he opposed. In January 2013, Santiago alleged that Enrile gave ₱1.6 million each to his fellow Senators, except for her, Pia Cayetano, Alan Peter Cayetano, and Trillanes, who was reported to have been only given ₱250 thousand each. He admitted giving the said amount to the senators, saying that it was part of the balance of the maintenance and other operating expenses (MOOE) funds allowed per senator. On January 21, 2013, because of the controversies involving him, he attempted to vacate his position as Senate President but his motion was rejected.

=== Resignation ===
Amid accusations against him, including the alleged distribution of MOOE funds to senators, Enrile stepped down as Senate President after his privilege speech on June 5, 2013.

== Post-Senate career (2016–2025) ==
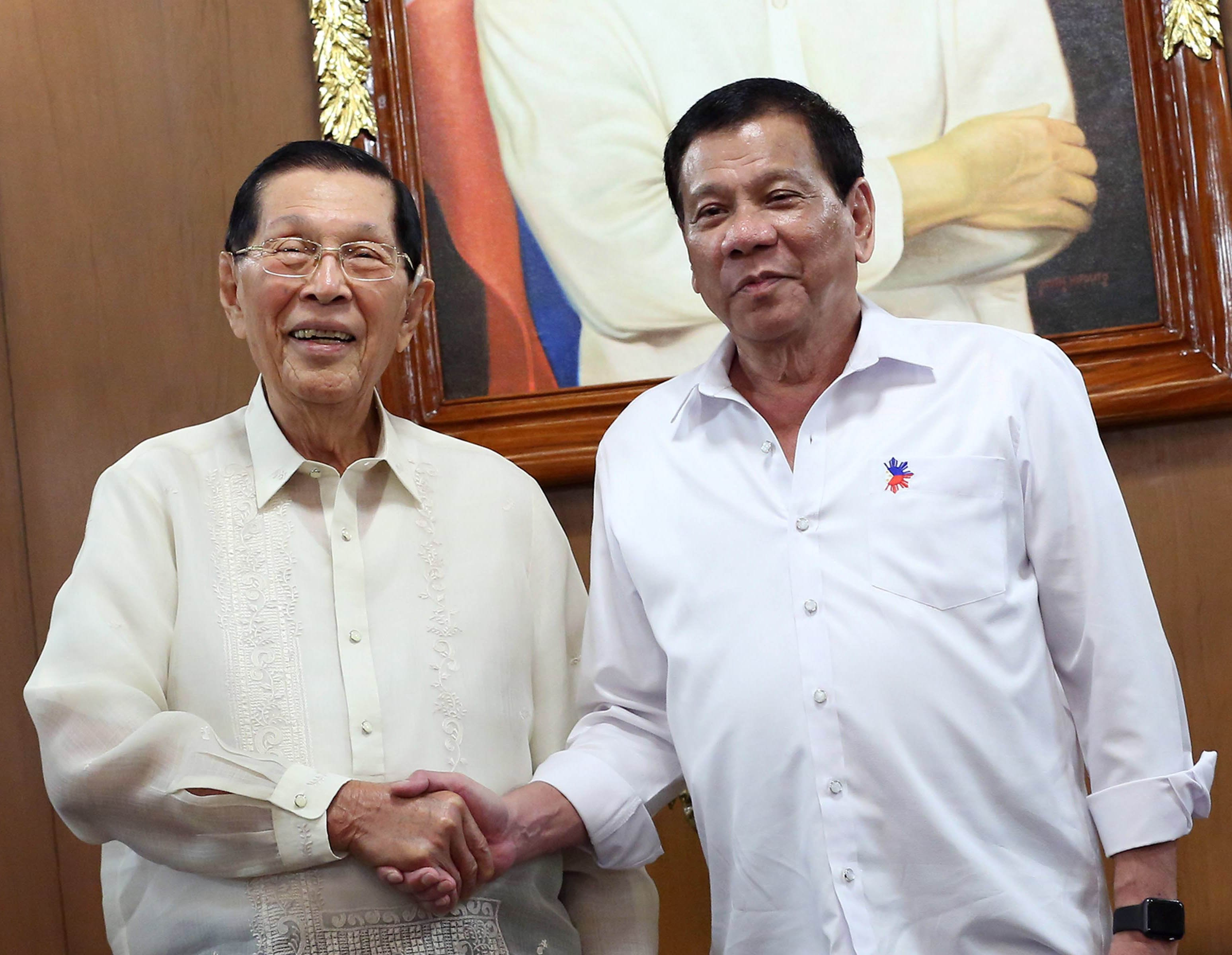
Enrile with President Rodrigo Duterte in 2017

Enrile left politics after his term in the Senate ended in 2016. He attempted to make a comeback in 2019 but was defeated, placing 22nd in a field of 62 candidates.

=== Chief Presidential Legal Counsel (2022–2025) ===
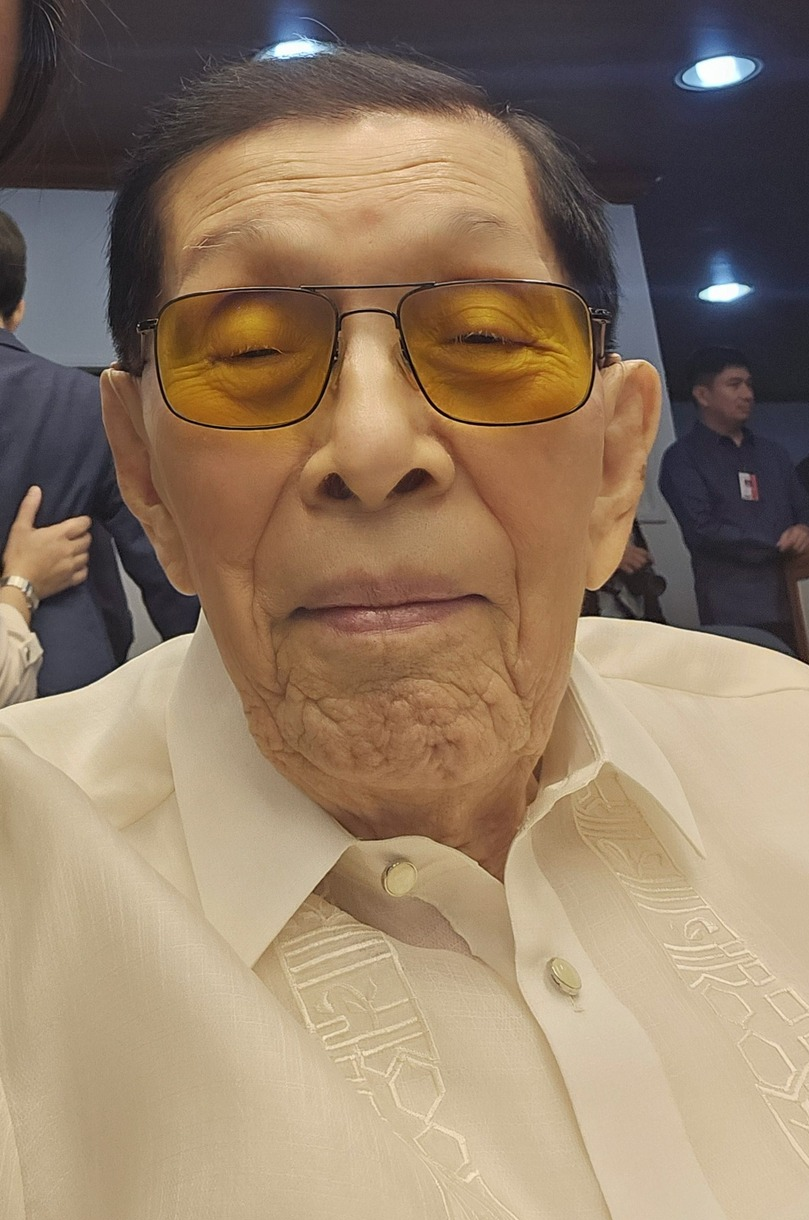
Enrile in 2024

In 2022, Enrile officially returned to government as the Chief Presidential Legal Counsel in the administration of President Bongbong Marcos, whom he supported in that year's presidential election. He played a role in forcing the resignation of Executive Secretary Vic Rodriguez on September 17 by rejecting the latter's appointing of himself as Presidential Chief of Staff with extensive powers. At the age of 101, he was the oldest serving member of the Marcos administration.

== Controversies ==
=== Enrile cash gift ===
In January 2013, while sitting as the Senate President, Enrile was accused of using Senate funds called MOOE as Christmas gifts to members of the Senate who did not oppose him. This led to his resignation as Senate President without sufficiently answering the controversy.

=== Involvement in the pork barrel scam ===
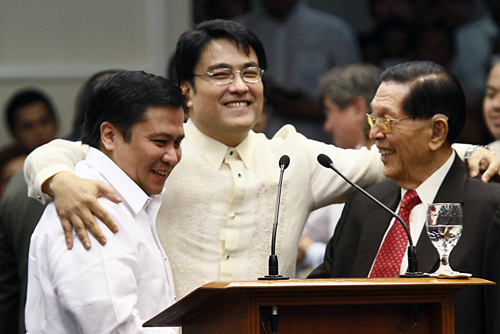
Enrile with Senators Jinggoy Estrada (left) and Bong Revilla (center) after Revilla's privilege speech "Salamat, Kaibigan" on June 9, 2014

In September 2013, Enrile was again involved in misappropriated funds, this time about the PDAF or what is commonly called the pork barrel fund. Twenty billion pesos worth of Priority Development Fund was illegally channeled through various bogus NGOs of Janet Lim-Napoles most of it being used by the Senator.

Enrile, along with fellow senators Bong Revilla, and Jinggoy Estrada, were indicted for plunder and for the violation of the Anti-Graft and Corrupt Practices Act before the Sandiganbayan on June 6, 2014, in connection to the Priority Development Assistance Fund scam. Alleged mastermind Janet Lim Napoles and Enrile's former chief of staff Gigi Reyes were also charged. Enrile allegedly received ₱172 million in kickbacks from public funds.

He was detained on July 3, 2014 and suspended from his Senate post on September 1, 2014, for these charges, after his motions to post bail to lift the suspension order were denied.

The Supreme Court of the Philippines en banc in its decision dated February 24, 2024, denied Enrile's petition to dismiss and directed the Sandiganbayan to proceed with the trial of the P172-million plunder case on the alleged pork barrel scam. On October 24, 2025, the Sandiganbayan acquitted Enrile, along with Gigi Reyes. This promulgation was Enrile's last public appearance before his death, albeit virtually via Zoom as he was on a hospital bed.

== Personal life ==
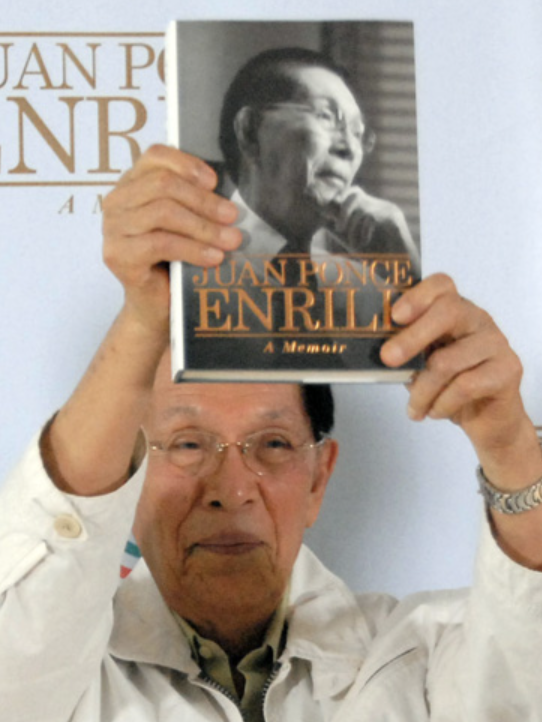
Enrile promoting his autobiography

Enrile, or "Manong Johnny" as he was often called (manong is an Ilocano term of endearment for an older brother), was married to Hispano-Filipina Cristina Castañer García on September 17, 1957, daughter of Cándido Castañer Rius of Barcelona and María del Pilar García-Granda y Pérez de Tagle of Manila (born in 1937) who has served as the Philippine Ambassador to the Holy See. They first met at a party organized by the Bachelors’ Club in the 1950s. They had two children: Juan Jr. (Jack) and Katrina. Juan Jr. is a former congressman for the 1st District of Cagayan (1998–2007; 2010–2013) who unsuccessfully ran for a Senate seat under the banner of the UNA in 2013, while Katrina is currently CEO of Enrile's company Jaka Group, which owns the Philippine Match Company, a matchbox manufacturer, and Delimondo, a food processing company. Enrile had a half-sister, Armida Siguion-Reyna, who was a singer, as well as a theater and film actress.

=== Extra-marital affair with Gigi Reyes ===
Enrile's rumored affair with his former long-time employee and chief of staff Jessica Lucila "Gigi" Reyes, 38 years his junior, came out after reports that Enrile's wife, Cristina, walked out on him in January 1998 after charging him with adultery. The news made both local and international headlines.

Gigi Reyes was regarded as "the door, if not the bridge" to Enrile, referring to the extent of closeness between the two. Enrile's special fondness for Reyes was again called out by Sen. Alan Peter Cayetano after Reyes accused Cayetano in a media interview of hypocrisy for supposedly receiving a "cash gift" from Enrile. The incident led to Reyes's resignation from Enrile's office, which Reyes said was also for her criticizing how Enrile responded to the issue of fund misuse. Enrile insisted the resignation was because of rumors of their illicit relationship. During the Priority Development Assistance Fund scandal, Reyes was once again linked to Enrile for signing documents that facilitated the release of Enrile's PDAF to fake non-governmental organizations (NGOs) linked to Janet Lim Napoles.

=== Longevity and public image ===
Having been one of the longest and oldest serving politicians in the Philippines, Enrile was often the subject of jokes and internet memes revolving around his longevity among Filipino humorists, with his alleged "immortality", supposed witnessing of prehistoric and biblical events, outliving domestic and international politicians and surviving disasters and health scares such as the COVID-19 pandemic being common themes.

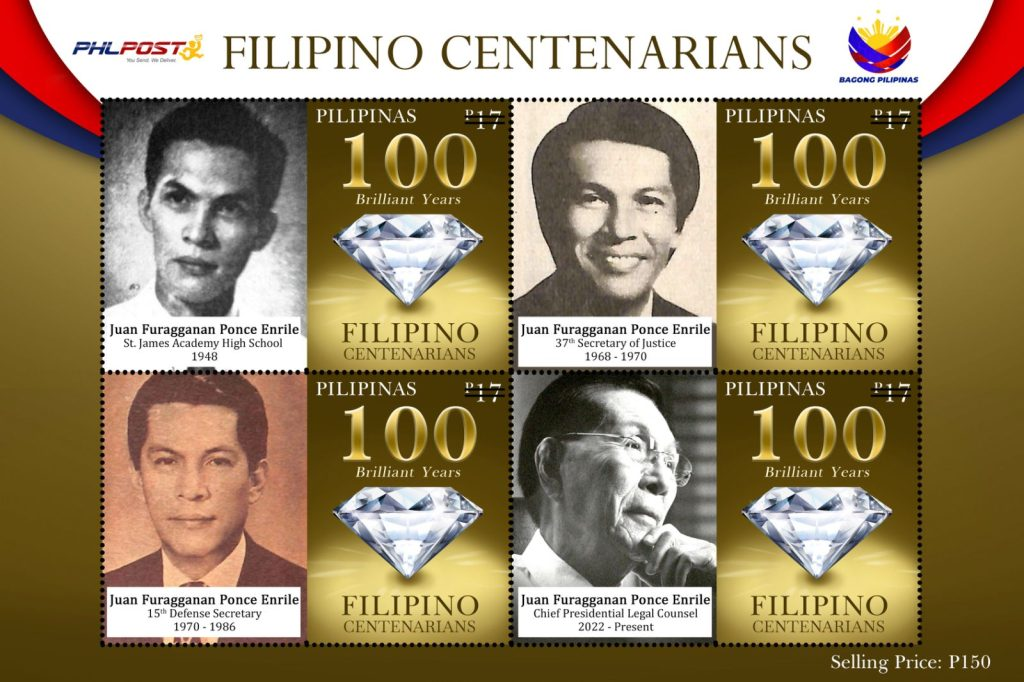
Enrile featured on a commemorative stamp issued by the Philippine Postal Corporation in honor of centennial birthday in 2024.

On February 14, 2024, he turned 100. He celebrated his centennial in Malacanang, during which President Bongbong Marcos said that he had "attained the status of an icon, in the pantheon of Philippine history". In honour of Enrile's centenary, the Philippine Postal Corporation issued a special personalised commemorative stamp that denotes the various offices held by Enrile through the decades. This was pursuant to provisions under Republic Act No. 10868, otherwise known as the Centenarian Act of 2016, which honours and grants additional benefits and privileges to Filipino centenarians. Enrile attributed his longevity to consuming leafy vegetables and conducting religious exercises. In November 2024, Francis Escudero introduced Senate Resolution No. 1223, a Resolution honoring the contributions of Juan Ponce Enrile to the country.

== Illness and death ==
By the early 1990s, Enrile was diagnosed with chronic hypertension. He rushed to the hospital due to his high blood pressure on September 14, 2013. He had diabetes mellitus, dyslipidemia, hypertension, extensive coronary artery calcification in the right coronary, left anterior descending and left circumflex, premature heart beats, macular degeneration, and several other age-related diseases according to medical certificate on May 6, 2014. He took 22 kinds of medication for his illnesses. The Sandiganbayan granted hospital arrest at the Philippine National Police General Hospital. He suffered pneumonia in 2015. He tested positive for COVID-19 on June 27, 2022.

On November 11, 2025, Enrile was reported to have been confined to the intensive care unit (ICU) of an undisclosed hospital due to pneumonia. He died at his home surrounded by his family on November 13, 2025, at the age of 101.

Public viewing of Enrile's remains were held on November 16–18 and 21, 2025, at his residence in Dasmariñas Village, Makati. On November 17, Tito Sotto introduced Senate Resolution No. 176 extending the Senate's condolences to Enrile's family. All the members of the Senate were co-sponsors and co-authors of the resolution. Necrological services were held on November 19, 2025, at the Senate session hall at GSIS Building in Pasay and at Camp Aguinaldo in Quezon City and on November 21 at the Malacañang Palace. On November 22, a funeral Mass for Enrile was held at the Santuario de San Antonio Parish in Forbes Park, Makati, followed by his interment at the Libingan ng mga Bayani in Taguig.

== Portrayals ==
Enrile was portrayed by Joonee Gamboa in the 1988 TV drama film A Dangerous Life, whose filming Enrile unsuccessfully tried to stop in court citing privacy issues. He was also portrayed by Bugoy Cariño and Enrique Gil in a two-part special on the television drama anthology series Maalaala Mo Kaya, featuring his life story. Both part of the program's 21st season, the first part that was aired on April 27, 2013, is entitled Sapatos (lit. transl. Shoes), while the second part that was aired on May 4, 2013, is entitled Diploma.

== Bibliography ==
- Enrile, Juan Ponce (2012). Navarro, Nelson A. (ed.). Juan Ponce Enrile: A Memoir. Manila: ABS-CBN Publishing. ISBN 978-971-816-117-3. OCLC 815873749.

== Electoral history ==
Electoral history of Juan Ponce Enrile
Year	Office	Party	Votes received				Result
Year	Office	Party	Total	%	P.	Swing	Result
1971	Senator of the Philippines	Nacionalista	3,044,461	32.32%	12th	—N/a	Lost
1987	Senator of the Philippines	Nacionalista	7,964,966	35.03%	24th	—N/a	Won
1995	Senator of the Philippines	Independent	8,701,191	33.81%	11th	—N/a	Won
2001	Senator of the Philippines	LDP	9,677,209	32.83%	14th	—N/a	Lost
2004	Senator of the Philippines	PMP	11,191,162	31.52%	9th	—N/a	Won
2010	Senator of the Philippines	PMP	15,665,618	41.06%	5th	—N/a	Won
2019	Senator of the Philippines	PMP	5,319,298	11.25%	22nd	—N/a	Lost
1978	Mambabatas Pambansa (Assemblyman) from Region II	KBL	847,090	13.44%	1st	—N/a	Won
1984	Mambabatas Pambansa (Assemblyman) from Cagayan	KBL	307,507	—N/a	1st	—N/a	Won
1992	Representative (Cagayan–1st)	Nacionalista	55,555	58.73%	1st	—N/a	Won
1998	President of the Philippines	Independent	297,801	1.43%	8th	—N/a	Lost

== Notes ==
Legal offices
Preceded by Jesus Melchor Quitain	Chief Presidential Legal Counsel; 2022–2025	Succeeded by Anna Liza Logan
Political offices
Preceded by Jacinto Gavino	Commissioner of the Bureau of Customs; 1966–1968	Succeeded by Rolando Geotina
Preceded by Claudio Teehankee	Secretary of Justice; 1968–1970	Succeeded by Felix Makasiar
Preceded by Ernesto Mata	Secretary of National Defense; 1970–1971	Succeeded by Ferdinand Marcos as Acting Secretary of National Defense
Preceded by Ferdinand Marcos as Acting Secretary of National Defense	Secretary/Minister of National Defense; 1972–1986	Succeeded by Rafael M. Ileto as Minister of National Defense
Senate of the Philippines
Recreated Title last held by Gerardo Roxas	Senate Minority Leader; 1987–1992	Succeeded by Wigberto Tañada
Preceded by Manny Villar	President of the Senate of the Philippines; 2008–2013	Succeeded by Jinggoy Estrada as Acting President of the Senate
Preceded by Alan Peter Cayetano	Senate Minority Leader; 2013–2014	Succeeded by Tito Sotto as Acting Senate Minority Leader
Preceded by Tito Sotto as Acting Senate Minority Leader	Senate Minority Leader; 2015–2016	Succeeded by Ralph Recto
House of Representatives of the Philippines
Preceded by Domingo Tuazon	Member of the Philippine House of Representatives from Cagayan–1st; 1992–1995	Succeeded by Patricio Antonio
