= Quezon Service Cross =

Philippine order

- Badge of the Quezon Service Cross
- Type: Decoration
- Awarded for: "Exemplary service to the nation in such a manner and such a degree as to add great prestige to the Republic of the Philippines, or as to contribute to the lasting benefit of its people."
- Country: Philippines
- Presented by: the President of the Philippines with the concurrence of the Congress of the Philippines
- Eligibility: Filipino citizens
- Motto: SIC FLORET RESPUBLICA; And thus, he distinguished the republic
- Status: Currently awarded
- Established: October 21, 1946
- First award: June 12, 1956
- Final award: December 3, 2018

Highlights
- Total: 6
- Total awarded posthumously: 5
- Total recipients: 6
- Ribbon bar of the award

Precedence
- Next (higher): None (highest)
- Next (lower): Order of Lakandula; Order of Sikatuna; Philippine Legion of Honor

The Quezon Service Cross (Filipino: Krus ng Serbisyo ni Quezon) is the highest order of the Republic of the Philippines. It has been awarded to only a handful of Filipinos since its creation in 1946.

== Background ==
The award was created by Joint Resolution No. 4 dated October 21, 1946, of the 1st Congress of the Philippines. A joint resolution of the Congress of the Philippines has the force of law. The Quezon Service Cross is a decoration conferred by the President of the Philippines with the concurrence of the Congress of the Philippines on Filipino citizens for "exemplary service to the nation in such a manner and such a degree as to add great prestige to the Republic of the Philippines, or as to contribute to the lasting benefit of its people".

Nominations for the Quezon Service Cross need to state the services meriting the award and are made only in cases where the service performed or contribution made can be measured on the scale established by what the joint resolution terms "the benefaction" of the late President Manuel L. Quezon, after whom the decoration is named.

The Quezon Service Cross was proposed by President Manuel Roxas. It is also referred to as the Congressional Quezon Service Cross, as conferment requires the approval of the Congress of the Philippines and is seldom awarded.

== Awardees ==
Only six Filipinos have been conferred this decoration:

Awardee		Designation	Date Awarded	President
Image	Name	Designation	Date Awarded	President
	Emilio Aguinaldo	President	June 12, 1956	Ramon Magsaysay
	Manuel Roxas	President	July 3, 1956 (posthumous)	Ramon Magsaysay
	Ramon Magsaysay	President	July 4, 1957 (posthumous)	Carlos P. Garcia
	Benigno Aquino Jr.	Senator	August 21, 2004 (posthumous)	Gloria Macapagal Arroyo
	Jesse Robredo	Secretary of the Interior and Local Government	November 26, 2012 (posthumous)	Benigno Aquino III
	Miriam Defensor Santiago	Senator	December 3, 2018 (posthumous)	Rodrigo Duterte

== Gallery ==
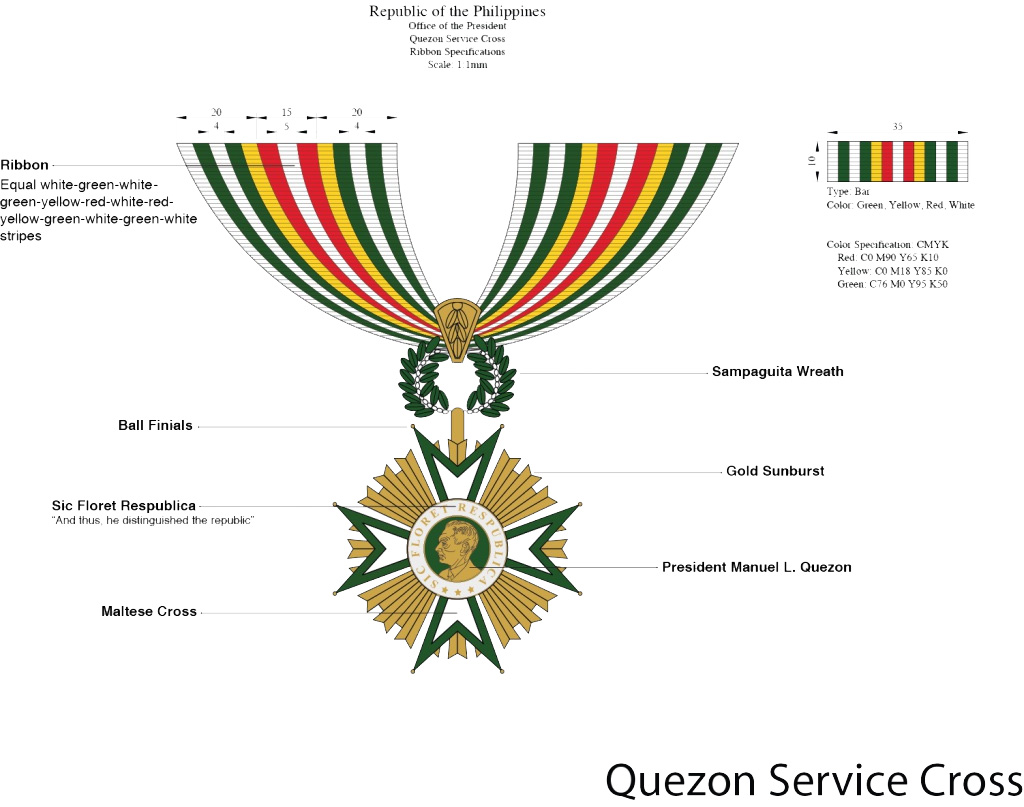
Quezon Service Cross design specification

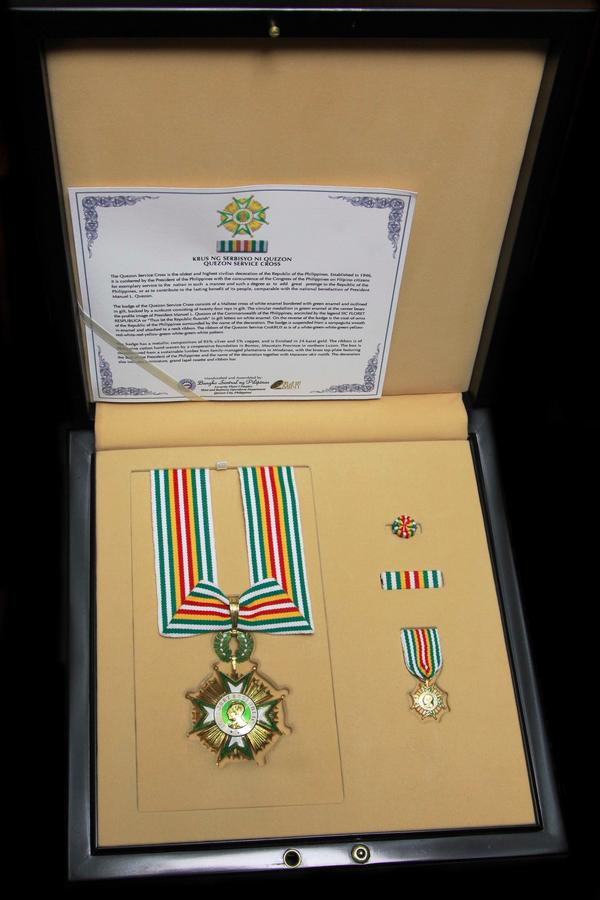
Quezon Service Cross given to Jesse Robredo in 2012

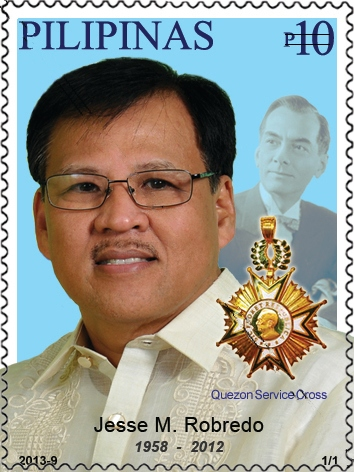
Robredo on a 2013 stamp of the Philippines featuring the QSC

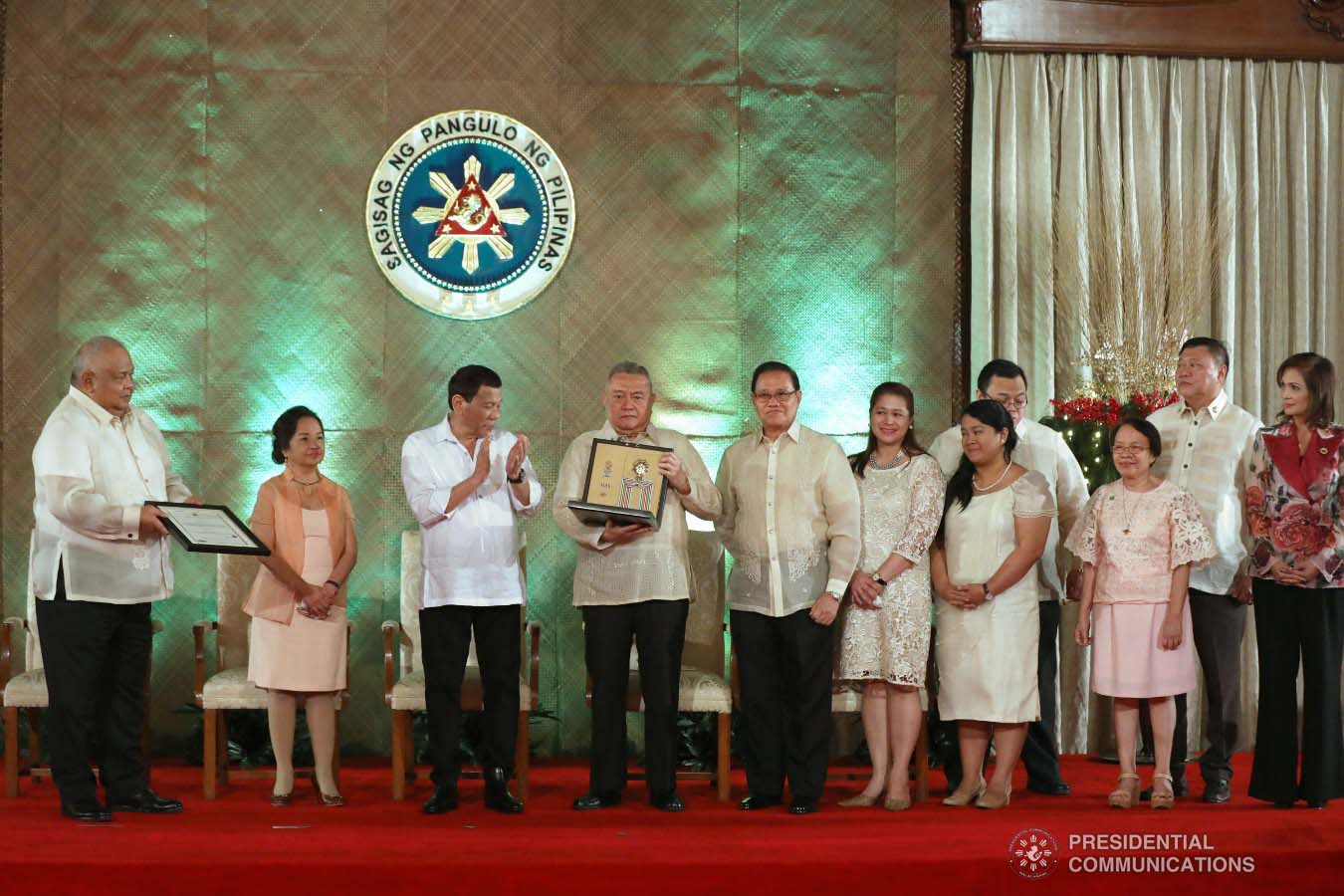
President Rodrigo Duterte posthumously confers the Quezon Service Cross to Miriam Defensor-Santiago at the Malacañan Palace on December 3, 2018. Accepting the award is Santiago's husband, Narciso Santiago, Jr.

== See also ==
- Orders, decorations, and medals of the Philippines
