= List of presidents of the Senate of the Philippines =

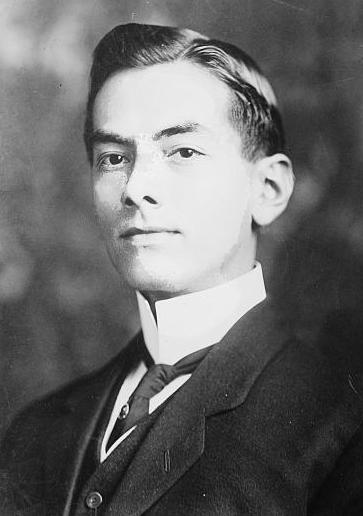
Manuel L. Quezon was the first and longest-serving president of the Senate.

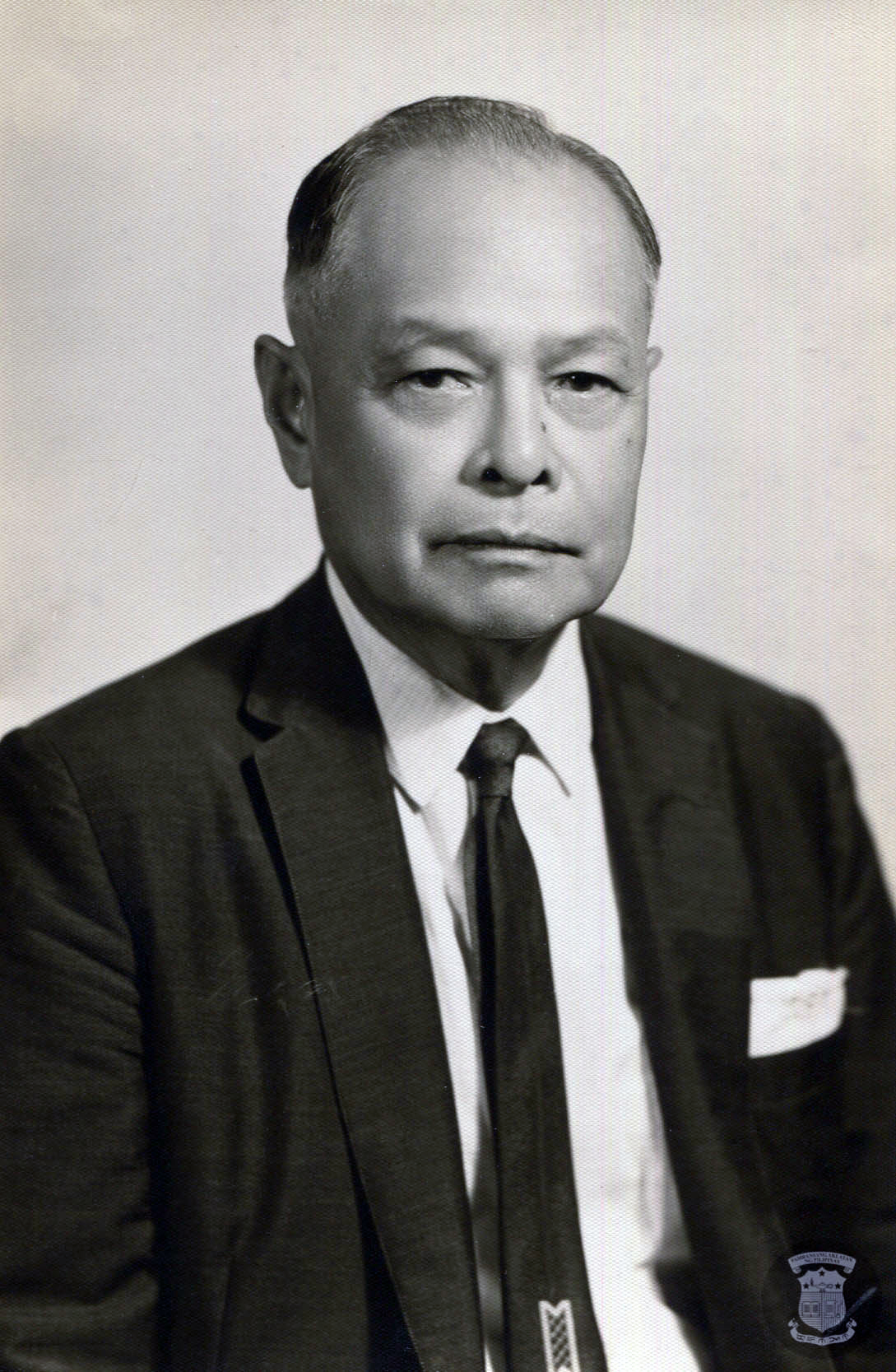
Camilo Osías served the shortest single term as president of the Senate.

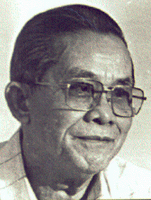
Jovito Salonga was the first post-martial law president of the Senate.

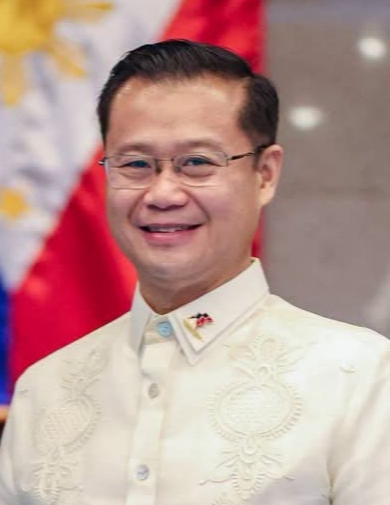
Sherwin Gatchalian is the current president of the Senate.

The president of the Senate of the Philippines is the presiding officer and the highest-ranking official of the Senate of the Philippines. The Senate president is second in the line of succession to the presidency, after the vice president and before the speaker of the House of Representatives.

The office was created in 1916, following the establishment of the Senate to replace the Philippine Commission as the upper house of the bicameral Philippine Legislature. The Senate president is the administrative head of the chamber and the ex officio chairperson of the Commission on Appointments.

The Senate elects a new president by roll call vote when it convenes during the first session of a new Congress, or when the incumbent Senate president dies, resigns, or is removed from office through a leadership coup. A majority of votes cast is required to elect a Senate president. If there is only one nominee for the position, the candidate is elected by acclamation.

Altogether, 27 individuals have served as president of the Senate. The incumbent Senate president is Sherwin Gatchalian, who assumed office on June 17, 2026. (Note: Gatchalian served as acting Senate president from June 3 to June 17, 2026, in his capacity as Senate president pro tempore, after the office of the Senate president was declared vacant. He was formally elected Senate president on June 17, 2026.)

== List of Senate presidents ==
All senators from 1941 onwards were elected at-large, with the whole Philippines as one constituency.

Every president of the Senate has been a member of a political party or faction; the number affiliated with each is:

Nacionalista – 9; (Note: Includes the tenures of Manuel L. Quezon from 1916 to 1922 and 1925 to 1934, Manuel Roxas from 1945 to 1946 and Ferdinand Marcos from 1964 to 1965.) Liberal – 7; (Note: Includes the tenures of Manuel Roxas in 1946, Ferdinand Marcos from 1963 to 1964, and Franklin Drilon from 2003 to 2006 and 2013 to 2016.) NPC – 4; LDP – 4; LAMP – 1; (Note: Includes the tenure of Franklin Drilon from July to November 3, 2000.) PDP–Laban – 2; Nacionalista Colectivista – 1; (Note: Includes the tenure of Manuel L. Quezon from 1922 to 1925.) Nacionalista Democratico – 1; (Note: Includes the tenure of Manuel L. Quezon from 1934 to 1935.) PMP – 2; Independent – 3. (Note: Includes the tenures of Franklin Drilon from November 3–13, 2000 and 2001 to 2003.)

No.	Portrait	Name (Birth–Death)	Term of office		Party/Coalition	Legislature
No.	Portrait	Name (Birth–Death)	Took office	Left office	Party/Coalition	Legislature
1		Manuel L. Quezon; Senator for the 5th District (1878–1944)	October 16, 1916	November 15, 1935	Nacionalista (until 1922)	4th Legislature
1		Manuel L. Quezon; Senator for the 5th District (1878–1944)	October 16, 1916	November 15, 1935	Nacionalista (until 1922)	5th Legislature
1		Manuel L. Quezon; Senator for the 5th District (1878–1944)	October 16, 1916	November 15, 1935	Nacionalista Colectivista (1922–1925)	6th Legislature
1		Manuel L. Quezon; Senator for the 5th District (1878–1944)	October 16, 1916	November 15, 1935	Nacionalista Consolidado (1925–1934)	7th Legislature
1		Manuel L. Quezon; Senator for the 5th District (1878–1944)	October 16, 1916	November 15, 1935	Nacionalista Consolidado (1925–1934)	8th Legislature
1		Manuel L. Quezon; Senator for the 5th District (1878–1944)	October 16, 1916	November 15, 1935	Nacionalista Consolidado (1925–1934)	9th Legislature
1		Manuel L. Quezon; Senator for the 5th District (1878–1944)	October 16, 1916	November 15, 1935	Nacionalista Democratico (from 1934)	10th Legislature
Senate abolished (November 15, 1935 – June 9, 1945)
2		Manuel Roxas (1892–1948)	June 9, 1945	May 28, 1946	Nacionalista (until 1946)	1st Commonwealth Congress
2		Manuel Roxas (1892–1948)	June 9, 1945	May 28, 1946	Liberal (from 1946)	1st Commonwealth Congress
3		José Avelino (1890–1986)	May 28, 1946	February 21, 1949	Liberal	2nd Commonwealth Congress
3		José Avelino (1890–1986)	May 28, 1946	February 21, 1949	Liberal	1st Congress
4		Mariano Cuenco (1888–1964)	February 21, 1949	December 30, 1951	Liberal	1st Congress
4		Mariano Cuenco (1888–1964)	February 21, 1949	December 30, 1951	Liberal	2nd Congress
Vacant (Note: The Senate was deadlocked in electing a Senate president from the first ballot on the opening of the third regular session in the 2nd Congress on January 28, 1952 until Quintín Paredes was elected Senate president on March 5. Paredes, who was then the incumbent president pro tempore, served as presiding officer after Mariano Cuenco's term as senator and concurrent Senate president ended.) (January 28 – March 5, 1952)						2nd Congress
5		Quintín Paredes (1884–1973)	March 5, 1952	April 17, 1952	Liberal	2nd Congress
6		Camilo Osías (1889–1976)	April 17, 1952	April 30, 1952	Nacionalista	2nd Congress
7		Eulogio Rodriguez (1883–1964)	April 30, 1952	April 17, 1953	Nacionalista	2nd Congress
8		Camilo Osías (1889–1976)	April 17, 1953	April 30, 1953	Nacionalista	2nd Congress
9		Jose Zulueta (1889–1972)	April 30, 1953	May 20, 1953	Nacionalista	2nd Congress
10		Eulogio Rodriguez (1883–1964)	May 20, 1953	April 5, 1963	Nacionalista	2nd Congress
10		Eulogio Rodriguez (1883–1964)	May 20, 1953	April 5, 1963	Nacionalista	3rd Congress
10		Eulogio Rodriguez (1883–1964)	May 20, 1953	April 5, 1963	Nacionalista	4th Congress
10		Eulogio Rodriguez (1883–1964)	May 20, 1953	April 5, 1963	Nacionalista	5th Congress
11		Ferdinand Marcos (1917–1989)	April 5, 1963	December 30, 1965	Liberal (until 1964)	5th Congress
11		Ferdinand Marcos (1917–1989)	April 5, 1963	December 30, 1965	Nacionalista (from 1964)	5th Congress
12		Arturo Tolentino (1910–2004)	January 17, 1966	January 26, 1967	Nacionalista	6th Congress
13		Gil Puyat (1907–1980)	January 26, 1967	January 17, 1973	Nacionalista	6th Congress
13		Gil Puyat (1907–1980)	January 26, 1967	January 17, 1973	Nacionalista	7th Congress
Senate abolished (Note: The ratification of the 1973 Constitution abolished the Senate, and a unicameral legislature was established, later known as the Batasang Pambansa.) (January 17, 1973 – February 2, 1987)
14		Jovito Salonga (1920–2016)	July 27, 1987	January 18, 1992	Liberal	8th Congress
15		Neptali Gonzales (1923–2001)	January 18, 1992	January 18, 1993	LDP	8th Congress
15		Neptali Gonzales (1923–2001)	January 18, 1992	January 18, 1993	LDP	9th Congress
16		Edgardo Angara (1934–2018)	January 18, 1993	August 28, 1995	LDP	9th Congress
16		Edgardo Angara (1934–2018)	January 18, 1993	August 28, 1995	LDP	10th Congress
17		Neptali Gonzales (1923–2001)	August 29, 1995	October 10, 1996	LDP	10th Congress
18		Ernesto Maceda (1935–2016)	October 10, 1996	January 26, 1998	NPC	10th Congress
19		Neptali Gonzales (1923–2001)	January 26, 1998	June 30, 1998	LDP	10th Congress
20		Marcelo Fernan (1927–1999)	July 27, 1998	June 28, 1999	LDP	11th Congress
—		Blas Ople (Note: Blas Ople served as acting president of the Senate until July 26, 1999.) (1927–2003)	June 28, 1999	July 26, 1999	LDP	11th Congress
21		Blas Ople (1927–2003)	July 26, 1999	April 12, 2000	LDP	11th Congress
22		Franklin Drilon (born 1945)	April 12, 2000	November 13, 2000	LAMP (until 2000)	11th Congress
22		Franklin Drilon (born 1945)	April 12, 2000	November 13, 2000	Independent (from 2000)	11th Congress
23		Nene Pimentel (1933–2019)	November 13, 2000	June 30, 2001	PDP–Laban	11th Congress
24		Franklin Drilon (born 1945)	July 23, 2001	July 24, 2006	Independent (until 2003)	12th Congress
24		Franklin Drilon (born 1945)	July 23, 2001	July 24, 2006	Liberal (from 2003)	12th Congress
24		Franklin Drilon (born 1945)	July 23, 2001	July 24, 2006	Liberal (from 2003)	13th Congress
25		Manny Villar (born 1949)	July 24, 2006	November 17, 2008	Nacionalista	13th Congress
25		Manny Villar (born 1949)	July 24, 2006	November 17, 2008	Nacionalista	14th Congress
26		Juan Ponce Enrile (1924–2025)	November 17, 2008	June 5, 2013	PMP	14th Congress
26		Juan Ponce Enrile (1924–2025)	November 17, 2008	June 5, 2013	PMP	15th Congress
—		Jinggoy Estrada (born 1963); Acting	June 5, 2013	July 22, 2013	PMP	15th Congress
27		Franklin Drilon (born 1945)	July 22, 2013	June 30, 2016	Liberal	16th Congress
28		Koko Pimentel (born 1964)	July 25, 2016	May 21, 2018	PDP–Laban	17th Congress
29		Tito Sotto (born 1948)	May 21, 2018	June 30, 2022	NPC	17th Congress
29		Tito Sotto (born 1948)	May 21, 2018	June 30, 2022	NPC	18th Congress
30		Juan Miguel Zubiri (born 1969)	July 25, 2022	May 20, 2024	Independent	19th Congress
31		Francis Escudero (born 1969)	May 20, 2024	September 8, 2025	NPC	19th Congress
31		Francis Escudero (born 1969)	May 20, 2024	September 8, 2025	NPC	20th Congress
32		Tito Sotto (born 1948)	September 8, 2025	May 11, 2026	NPC	20th Congress
33		Alan Peter Cayetano (born 1970)	May 11, 2026	June 3, 2026	Independent	20th Congress
—		Sherwin Gatchalian (Note: Sherwin Gatchalian served as acting president of the Senate from until June 17, 2026.) (born 1974)	June 3, 2026	June 17, 2026	NPC	20th Congress
34		Sherwin Gatchalian (born 1974)	June 17, 2026	Incumbent	NPC	20th Congress

== Senate presidents by time in office ==
Rank	Name	Time in office (Note: Cumulative tenure)	TE	Year(s) in which elected
1	Manuel L. Quezon	19 years, 30 days	7	1916; 1919; 1922; 1925; 1928; 1931; 1934
2	Eulogio Rodriguez	10 years, 307 days	6	1952; 1953; 1954; 1956; 1958; 1960
3	Franklin Drilon	8 years, 104 days	4	2000; 2001; 2004; 2013
4	Gil Puyat	5 years, 241 days	4	1967; 1968; 1970; 1972
5	Tito Sotto	4 years, 285 days	3	2018; 2019; 2025
6	Juan Ponce Enrile	4 years, 200 days	2	2008; 2010
7	Jovito Salonga	4 years, 175 days	1	1987
8	Mariano Cuenco	2 years, 312 days	2	1949; 1952
9 (tie)	José Avelino	2 years, 269 days	2	1946; 1948
9 (tie)	Ferdinand Marcos	2 years, 269 days	2	1963; 1964
11	Edgardo Angara	2 years, 222 days	2	1993; 1995
12	Neptali Gonzales	2 years, 197 days	4	1992 (2); 1995; 1998
13	Manny Villar	2 years, 116 days	2	2006; 2007
14 (tie)	Koko Pimentel	1 year, 300 days	1	2016
14 (tie)	Migz Zubiri	1 year, 300 days	1	2022
16	Francis Escudero	1 year, 111 days	2	2024; 2025
17	Ernesto Maceda	1 year, 108 days	1	1996
18	Arturo Tolentino	1 year, 9 days	1	1966
19	Manuel Roxas	353 days	1	1945
20	Blas Ople	352 days	1	1999
21	Marcelo Fernan	336 days	1	1998
22	Nene Pimentel	229 days	1	2000
23	Sherwin Gatchalian	152 days	1	2026
24	Quintín Paredes	43 days	1	1952
25	Camilo Osías	26 days	2	1952; 1953
26	Alan Peter Cayetano	23 days	1	2026
27	Jose Zulueta	20 days	1	1953

== See also ==
- List of President of the Senate of the Philippines elections
- Floor leaders of the Senate of the Philippines
- List of current presidents of legislatures
