= List of President of the Senate of the Philippines elections =

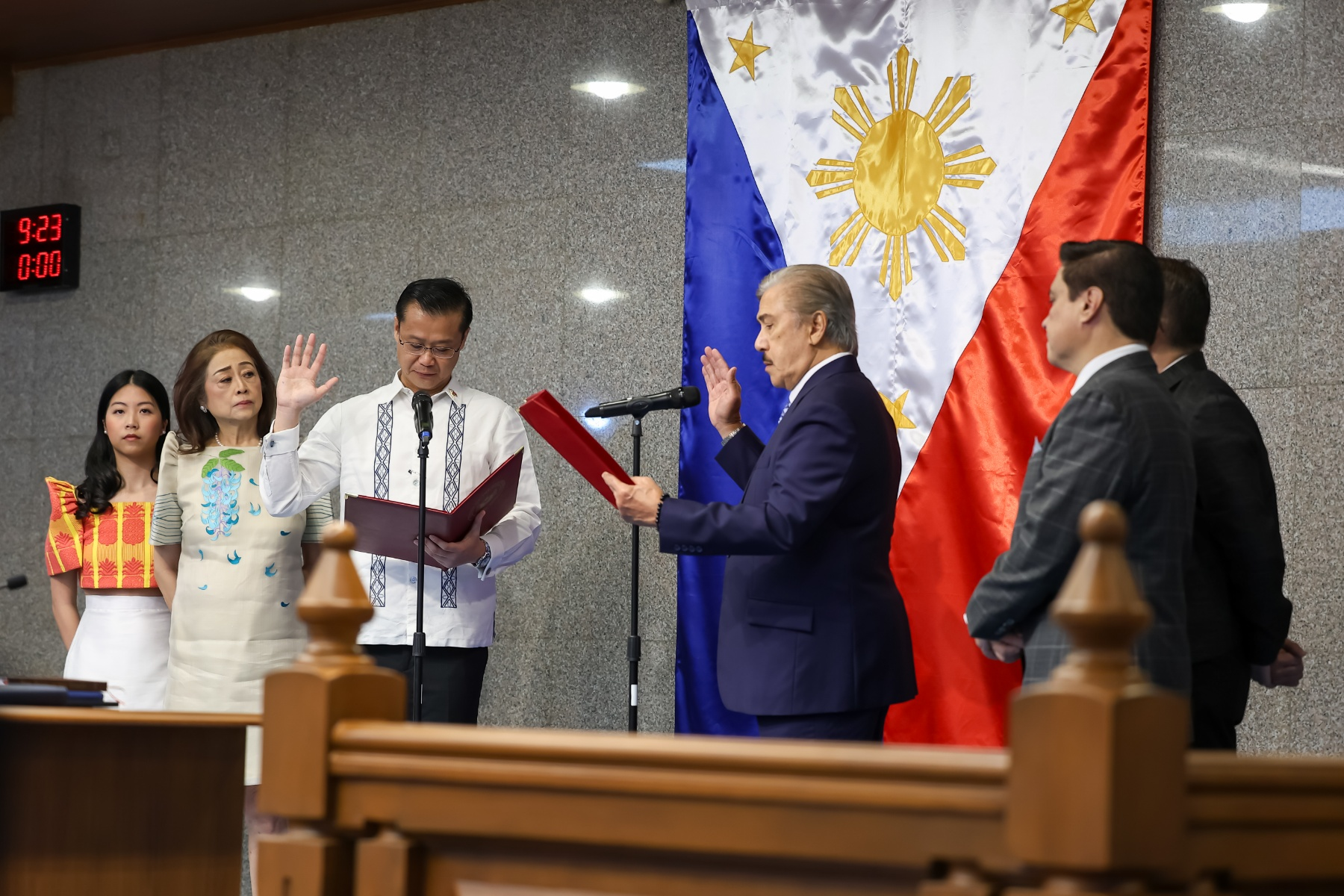
Sherwin Gatchalian (third from left) is sworn in by Tito Sotto (third from right) as president of the Senate on June 17, 2026.

An election for the president of the Senate of the Philippines is held when the Senate convenes at the opening of a new Congress; when the incumbent president is ousted from the position through a motion of no confidence, declaring the presidency as vacant, or a resolution containing the signatures of a majority of senators supporting another senator as Senate president; dies in office; or resigns. The Senate President is the highest-ranking official of the upper chamber as its presiding officer.

Elections for the Senate presidency are held at least every three years, and have been held 56 times since the establishment of the office in 1916. Prior to the emergence of the multi-party system in the Philippines after the reestablishment of the bicameral legislature in 1987, major political parties in the Senate selected a candidate for the body's presidency from among its members as their nominee. In recent decades, where multiple parties are represented in the Senate, internal alliances between different parties are formed to create a bloc that enables its members to choose a candidate for Senate president. The votes are traditionally cast by roll call, or, if there is only one nominee for the position, the candidate is elected by acclamation. Thirteen votes out of the full membership of the Senate are required to elect a president, although past elections held in rump sessions were conducted with the minimum number of members in session for a quorum. Only senators who are present are eligible to vote and to become candidates for the presidency of the Senate.

In elections in which no candidate receives a majority of the votes, the roll call is repeated until the Senate elects a president.

Altogether, 27 individuals have served as Senate president throughout Philippine legislative history, five of whom served non-consecutive terms and twelve of whom served tenures across two or more legislatures or Congresses. The first and longest-serving president of the Senate, Manuel L. Quezon, who served for 16 consecutive years from 1916 to 1935, holds the record for most electoral victories, having been elected seven times to the Senate presidency.

- Elections from 1916 to 1935
- 1916
- 1919
- 1922
- 1925
- 1928
- 1931
- 1934
- Elections from 1945 to 1972
- 1945
- 1946
- 1948
- February 1949
- December 1949
- March 1952
- April 17, 1952
- April 30, 1952
- April 17, 1953
- April 30, 1953
- May 1953
- 1954
- 1956
- 1958
- 1960
- 1962–63
- 1964
- 1966
- 1967
- 1968
- 1970
- 1972
- Elections since 1987
- 1987
- 1991
- 1992
- 1993
- July 1995
- August 1995
- 1996
- January 1998
- July 1998
- 1999
- April 2000
- November 2000
- 2001
- 2004
- 2006
- 2007
- 2008
- 2010
- 2013
- 2016
- 2018
- 2019
- 2022
- 2024
- July 2025
- September 2025
- May 2026
- June 2026

== Elections from 1916 to 1935 ==
=== October 1916 ===
The first election for the president of the Senate took place on October 16, 1916, the day when the Philippine Senate was established and when the 4th Legislature began, following the 1916 elections in which members of the Nacionalista Party won a majority of the seats. Manuel L. Quezon, a senator from the fifth district, was elected president of the Senate by acclamation.

1916 election for president of the Senate
Party	Candidate	Votes	%
Nacionalista	Manuel L. Quezon (5th district)	24	100.00
Total votes		24	100.00

=== October 1919 ===
An election for the president of the Senate took place on October 16, 1919, at the start of the 5th Legislature, following the 1919 elections in which members of the Nacionalista Party won a majority of the seats. Manuel L. Quezon was re-elected president of the Senate.

1919 election for president of the Senate
Party	Candidate	Votes	%
Nacionalista	Manuel L. Quezon (5th district) (incumbent)	≥13	(Note: As the specific number of votes in the election is not known, a candidate vote percentage is indeterminable.)
Total votes		(?)	100.00

=== October 1922 ===
An election for the president of the Senate took place on October 16, 1922, at the start of the 6th Legislature, following the 1922 elections in which members of the Colectivista faction of the Nacionalista Party won a majority of the seats. Manuel L. Quezon was re-elected president of the Senate.

1922 election for president of the Senate
Party	Candidate	Votes	%
Nacionalista Colectivista	Manuel L. Quezon (5th district) (incumbent)	≥13	
Total votes		(?)	100.00

=== July 1925 ===
An election for the president of the Senate took place on October 16, 1919, at the start of the 7th Legislature, following the 1925 elections in which members of the Nacionalista Consolidado Party won a majority of the seats. Manuel L. Quezon was re-elected president of the Senate.

1925 election for president of the Senate
Party	Candidate	Votes	%
Nacionalista Consolidado	Manuel L. Quezon (5th district) (incumbent)	≥13	
Total votes		(?)	100.00

=== July 1928 ===
An election for the president of the Senate took place on July 16, 1928, at the start of the 8th Legislature, following the 1928 elections in which members of the Nacionalista Consolidado Party won a majority of the seats. Manuel L. Quezon was re-elected president of the Senate.

1928 election for president of the Senate
Party	Candidate	Votes	%
Nacionalista Consolidado	Manuel L. Quezon (5th district) (incumbent)	≥13	
Total votes		(?)	100.00

=== July 1931 ===
An election for the president of the Senate took place on July 16, 1931, at the start of the 9th Legislature, following the 1931 elections in which members of the Nacionalista Consolidado Party won a majority of the seats. Manuel L. Quezon was re-elected president of the Senate.

1931 election for president of the Senate
Party	Candidate	Votes	%
Nacionalista Consolidado	Manuel L. Quezon (5th district) (incumbent)	≥13	
Total votes		(?)	100.00

=== July 1934 ===
An election for the president of the Senate took place on July 16, 1934, at the start of the 10th Legislature, following the 1934 elections in which members of the Democratico faction of the Nacionalista Party won a majority of the seats. Manuel L. Quezon was re-elected president of the Senate.

1934 election for president of the Senate
Party	Candidate	Votes	%
Nacionalista Democratico	Manuel L. Quezon (5th district) (incumbent)	14	
Nacionalista Democrata Pro-Independencia	Sergio Osmeña (10th district)	4	
Total votes		18+	100.00

== Elections from 1945 to 1972 ==
=== June 1945 ===
An election for the president of the Senate took place on June 9, 1945, when the 1st Commonwealth Congress finally convened after the end of World War II which had prevented senators elected in 1941 from taking office, following the 1941 elections in which members of the Nacionalista Party won all twenty-four Senate seats. Manuel Roxas was elected president of the Senate by acclamation.

1945 election for president of the Senate
Party	Candidate	Votes	%
Nacionalista	Manuel Roxas	13	100.00
Total votes		13	100.00

=== May 1946 ===
On May 25, 1946, on the opening day of the 2nd Commonwealth Congress, senators from the minority walked out of session after the majority argued that a majority vote shall be enough for the chamber to organize itself. The minority senators, led by Tomás Confesor, insisted that the rules of the pre-World War II Senate should apply. An election for the president of the Senate took place three days later on May 28, 1946, following the 1946 elections in which members of the Liberal Party won a majority of the seats. José Avelino was elected president of the Senate.

1946 election for president of the Senate
Party	Candidate	Votes	%
Liberal	José Avelino	≥13	
Total votes		(?)	100.00

=== January 1948 ===
An election for the president of the Senate took place on January 26, 1948, at the opening of the third regular session of the 1st Congress, following the 1947 elections in which members of the Liberal won a majority of the seats. José Avelino was re-elected president of the Senate.

1948 election for president of the Senate
Party	Candidate	Votes	%
Liberal	José Avelino (incumbent)	≥13	
Total votes		(?)	100.00

=== February 1949 ===
On February 21, 1949, José Avelino was ousted from the Senate presidency after Avelino and nine of his supporters walked out of session. Consequently, an intra-term election for a new Senate president was held on the same day, during the 1st Congress. Mariano Jesús Cuenco was elected president of the Senate. Avelino branded the subsequent session, his ouster and Cuenco's election as illegal, while President Elpidio Quirino recognized Cuenco as the new Senate president.

February 1949 election for president of the Senate
Party	Candidate	Votes	%
Liberal	Mariano Jesús Cuenco	12	100.00
Total votes		12	100.00

=== December 1949 ===
An election for the president of the Senate took place on December 30, 1949, at the start of the 2nd Congress, following the 1949 elections in which members of the Liberal Party won a majority of the seats. Mariano Jesús Cuenco was re-elected president of the Senate.

December 1949 election for president of the Senate
Party	Candidate	Votes	%
Liberal	Mariano Jesús Cuenco (incumbent)	≥13	
Total votes		(?)	100.00

=== March 1952 ===
An election for the president of the Senate took place on March 5, 1952, at the resumption of session of the 2nd Congress, wherein both the Nacionalista Party and Liberal Party had twelve senators each. 35 days after the opening of the third regular session on January 28, Felisberto Verano of the Nacionalista Party crossed the floor and broke the tie for the Liberals. Quintín Paredes was elected president of the Senate.

March 1952 election for president of the Senate
Party	Candidate	Votes	%
Liberal	Quintín Paredes	13	54.17
Nacionalista	Eulogio Rodriguez	11	45.83
Total votes		24	100.00

=== April 17, 1952 ===
On April 17, 1952, Quintín Paredes resigned from the Senate presidency. Consequently, an intra-term election for a new Senate president was held on the same day, during the 2nd Congress. Camilo Osías was elected president of the Senate.

April 17, 1952 election for president of the Senate
Party	Candidate	Votes	%
Nacionalista	Camilo Osías	≥13	
Total votes		(?)	100.00

=== April 30, 1952 ===
On April 30, 1952, Camilo Osías was ousted from the Senate presidency through a motion to vacate. Consequently, an intra-term election for a new Senate president was held on the same day, during the 2nd Congress. Eulogio Rodriguez was elected president of the Senate.

April 30, 1952 election for president of the Senate
Party	Candidate	Votes	%
Nacionalista	Eulogio Rodriguez	21	95.45
Against		1	4.55
Total votes		22	100.00

=== April 17, 1953 ===
On April 17, 1953, Eulogio Rodriguez was ousted from the Senate presidency. Consequently, an intra-term election for a new Senate president was held on the same day, during the 2nd Congress. Camilo Osías was elected president of the Senate.

April 17, 1953 election for president of the Senate
Party	Candidate	Votes	%
Nacionalista	Camilo Osías	≥13	
Total votes		(?)	100.00

=== April 30, 1953 ===
On April 30, 1953, Camilo Osías was ousted from the Senate presidency. Consequently, an intra-term election for a new Senate president was held on the same day, during the 2nd Congress. Jose Zulueta was elected president of the Senate.

April 30, 1953 election for president of the Senate
Party	Candidate	Votes	%
Liberal	Jose Zulueta	≥13	
Total votes		(?)	100.00

=== May 1953 ===
On May 20, 1953, Jose Zulueta resigned from the Senate presidency. Consequently, an intra-term election for a new Senate president was held on the same day, during the 2nd Congress. Eulogio Rodriguez was elected president of the Senate by acclamation.

May 1953 election for president of the Senate
Party	Candidate	Votes	%
Nacionalista	Eulogio Rodriguez	Unanimous (Note: Eulogio Rodriguez was elected unanimously, although the Congressional Record does not state the number of senators present during the vote.)	100.00
Total votes		13+	100.00

=== January 1954 ===
An election for the president of the Senate took place on January 25, 1954, at the start of the 3rd Congress, following the 1953 elections in which members of the Nacionalista Party won a majority of the seats. Eulogio Rodriguez was re-elected president of the Senate.

1954 election for president of the Senate
Party	Candidate	Votes	%
Nacionalista	Eulogio Rodriguez (incumbent)	20	83.33
Liberal	Quintín Paredes	1	4.17
Liberal	Macario Peralta Jr.	1	4.17
Abstention		1	4.17
Total votes		24	100.00

=== January 1956 ===
An election for the president of the Senate took place on January 23, 1956, at the opening of the third regular session of the 3rd Congress, following the 1955 elections in which members of the Nacionalista Party won a majority of the seats. Eulogio Rodriguez was re-elected president of the Senate by acclamation.

1956 election for president of the Senate
Party	Candidate	Votes	%
Nacionalista	Eulogio Rodriguez (incumbent)	22	100.00
Total votes		22	100.00

=== January 1958 ===
An election for the president of the Senate took place on January 27, 1958, at the start of the 4th Congress, following the 1957 elections in which members of the Nacionalista Party won a majority of the seats. Eulogio Rodriguez was re-elected president of the Senate by acclamation.

1958 election for president of the Senate
Party	Candidate	Votes	%
Nacionalista	Eulogio Rodriguez (incumbent)	24	100.00
Total votes		24	100.00

=== January 1960 ===
An election for the president of the Senate took place on January 25, 1960, at the opening of the third regular session of the 4th Congress, following the 1959 elections in which members of the Nacionalista Party won a majority of the seats. Eulogio Rodriguez was re-elected president of the Senate by acclamation.

1960 election for president of the Senate
Party	Candidate	Votes	%
Nacionalista	Eulogio Rodriguez (incumbent)	24	100.00
Total votes		24	100.00

=== January 1962 – April 1963 ===
An election for the president of the Senate took place on January 24, 1962, two days after the start of the 5th Congress, following the 1961 elections. The Nacionalista and Liberal parties each had 12 members, resulting in a deadlock across multiple ballots. Incumbent Senate president pro tempore Fernando Lopez (Nacionalista) and Minority Leader Ferdinand Marcos (Liberal) were their respective parties' candidates.

On April 5, 1963, Eulogio Rodriguez, who had been serving as Senate president in a holdover capacity, was unseated after a deadlock was broken by Alejandro Almendras, a Nacionalista senator, who voted for Ferdinand Marcos. Marcos's election was notably preceded by what became known as Roseller T. Lim's "Great Filibuster," an attempt to delay the vote until Almendras's arrival.

1962–63 election for president of the Senate
January 24, 1962 – 1st ballot
Party	Candidate	Votes	%
Nacionalista	Fernando Lopez	12	50.00
Liberal	Ferdinand Marcos	12	50.00
Total votes		24	100.00
April 5, 1963 – Final ballot
Party	Candidate	Votes	%
Liberal	Ferdinand Marcos	13	54.17
Nacionalista	Eulogio Rodriguez (incumbent)	11	45.83
Total votes		24	100.00

=== January 1964 ===
An election for the president of the Senate took place on January 27, 1964, at the opening of the third regular session of the 5th Congress, following the 1963 elections in which members of the Liberal won a majority of the seats. Ferdinand Marcos was re-elected president of the Senate.

1964 election for president of the Senate
Party	Candidate	Votes	%
Liberal	Ferdinand Marcos (incumbent)	≥13	
Total votes		(?)	100.00

=== January 1966 ===
An election for the president of the Senate took place on January 17, 1966, at the start of the 6th Congress, following the 1965 elections in which members of the Nacionalista Party won a majority of the seats. Arturo Tolentino was elected president of the Senate.

1966 election for president of the Senate
Party	Candidate	Votes	%
Nacionalista	Arturo Tolentino	≥13	
Total votes		(?)	100.00

=== January 1967 ===
On January 26, 1967, Arturo Tolentino was ousted from the Senate presidency. Consequently, an intra-term election for a new Senate president was held on the same day, during the 6th Congress. Gil Puyat was elected president of the Senate.

1967 election for president of the Senate
Party	Candidate	Votes	%
Nacionalista	Gil Puyat	13	61.90%
Nacionalista	Arturo Tolentino (incumbent)	8	38.10%
Total votes		21	100.00

=== January 1968 ===
An election for the president of the Senate took place on January 22, 1968, at the opening of the third regular session of the 6th Congress, following the 1967 elections in which members of the Nacionalista Party won a majority of the seats. Gil Puyat was re-elected president of the Senate.

1968 election for president of the Senate
Party	Candidate	Votes	%
Nacionalista	Gil Puyat (incumbent)	16	66.67
Abstention		8	33.33
Total votes		24	100.00

=== January 1970 ===
An election for the president of the Senate took place on January 26, 1970, at the start of the 7th Congress, following the 1969 elections in which members of the Nacionalista Party won a majority of the seats. Gil Puyat was re-elected president of the Senate.

1970 election for president of the Senate
Party	Candidate	Votes	%
Nacionalista	Gil Puyat (incumbent)	19	82.61
Abstention		4	17.39
Total votes		23	100.00

=== January 1972 ===
An election for the president of the Senate took place on January 24, 1972, at the opening of the third regular session of the 7th Congress, following the 1971 elections in which members of the Nacionalista Party won a majority of the seats. Gil Puyat was re-elected president of the Senate.

1967 election for president of the Senate
Party	Candidate	Votes	%
Nacionalista	Gil Puyat (incumbent)	≥13	
Total votes		(?)	100.00

== Elections since 1987 ==
=== July 1987 ===
An election for the president of the Senate took place on July 27, 1987, at the start of the 8th Congress, following the 1987 elections on the inauguration of the restored Senate. Only 23 senators were present, as the 24th and final senator was still undetermined due to delays in the tallying of votes. In a near-unanimous vote, Jovito Salonga was elected president of the Senate.

1987 election for president of the Senate
Party	Candidate	Votes	%
Liberal	Jovito Salonga	22	95.65
Against		1	4.35
Total votes		23	100.00

=== December 1991 ===
On December 12, 1991, Salonga, agreeing that there was no quorum, adjourned the session. Later that morning in a rump session of 13 senators (the smallest number that can constitute a quorum), an intra-term election for a new Senate president was held. Neptali Gonzales was elected president of the Senate, while the pro-Salonga senators closeted themselves in his office.

1991 election for president of the Senate
Party	Candidate	Votes	%
LDP	Neptali Gonzales	13	100.00
Total votes		13	100.00

=== July 1992 ===
An election for the president of the Senate took place on July 27, 1992, at the start of the 9th Congress, following the 1992 elections. Neptali Gonzales was re-elected president of the Senate.

1992 election for president of the Senate
Party	Candidate	Votes	%
LDP	Neptali Gonzales (incumbent)	23	95.83
Abstention		1	4.17
Total votes		24	100.00

=== January 1993 ===
On January 18, 1993, Neptali Gonzales resigned from the Senate presidency after losing support of the majority, including renegade members of his party, LDP, and Lakas–NUCD senators. Consequently, an intra-term election for a new Senate president was held on the same day, during the 9th Congress. Edgardo Angara was elected president of the Senate.

1993 election for president of the Senate
Party	Candidate	Votes	%
LDP	Edgardo Angara	≥13	
Total votes		(?)	100.00

=== July 1995 ===
An election for the president of the Senate took place on July 24, 1995, at the start of the 10th Congress, following the 1995 elections. Edgardo Angara was re-elected president of the Senate.

July 1995 election for president of the Senate
Party	Candidate	Votes	%
LDP	Edgardo Angara (incumbent)	20	86.96
Abstention		3	13.04
Total votes		23	100.00

=== August 1995 ===
On August 29, 1995, Edgardo Angara was ousted from the Senate presidency. Consequently, an intra-term election for a new Senate president was held on the same day, during the 10th Congress. Neptali Gonzales was elected president of the Senate.

August 1995 election for president of the Senate
Party	Candidate	Votes	%
LDP	Neptali Gonzales	19	82.61
LDP	Edgardo Angara (incumbent)	4	17.39
Total votes		23	100.00

=== October 1996 ===
On October 10, 1996, Neptali Gonzales resigned from the Senate presidency, admitting that he had lost the support the majority of his peers. Consequently, an intra-term election for a new Senate president was held on the same day, during the 10th Congress. Ernesto Maceda was elected president of the Senate.

1996 election for president of the Senate
Party	Candidate	Votes	%
NPC	Ernesto Maceda	13	100.00
Total votes		13	100.00

=== January 1998 ===
On January 26, 1998, Ernesto Maceda was ousted from the Senate presidency. Consequently, an intra-term election for a new Senate president was held on the same day, during the 10th Congress. Neptali Gonzales was elected president of the Senate.

January 1998 election for president of the Senate
Party	Candidate	Votes	%
LDP	Neptali Gonzales	≥13	
Total votes		(?)	100.00

=== July 1998 ===
An election for the president of the Senate took place on July 27, 1998, at the start of the 11th Congress, following the 1998 elections. Marcelo Fernan was elected president of the Senate.

July 1998 election for president of the Senate
Party	Candidate	Votes	%
LDP	Marcelo Fernan	22	91.67
Gabay Bayan	Francisco Tatad	2	8.33
Total votes		24	100.00

=== July 1999 ===
On June 28, 1999, Marcelo Fernan resigned from the Senate presidency due to failing health. Senate president pro tempore Blas Ople was designated acting Senate president the same day. Fernan had died on July 11, 1999, between the first and second sessions of the 11th Congress. Consequently, an intra-term election for a new president of the Senate was held on July 26, 1999, when Congress reconvened. Blas Ople received a majority of the votes cast and was elected president of the Senate.

1999 election for president of the Senate
Party	Candidate	Votes	%
LDP	Blas Ople	≥13	
Total votes		(?)	100.00

=== April 2000 ===
On April 12, 2000, Blas Ople resigned from the Senate presidency due to a term-sharing agreement with Franklin Drilon. Consequently, an intra-term election for a new Senate president was held on the same day, during the 11th Congress. Franklin Drilon was elected president of the Senate via unanimous vote after Teofisto Guingona Jr. withdrew his candidacy after being nominated by Robert Barbers.

April 2000 election for president of the Senate
Party	Candidate	Votes	%
LAMMP	Franklin Drilon	23	100.00
Total votes		23	100.00

=== November 2000 ===
On November 13, 2000, Franklin Drilon was ousted from the Senate presidency, with the impending impeachment trial of president Joseph Estrada. Drilon had previously attended anti-Estrada protests a week before, and had resigned from the ruling Lapian ng Masang Pilipino party. Juan Ponce Enrile motioned to declare all leadership positions vacant, which was sustained by a vote of 12–7. Consequently, an intra-term election for a new Senate president was held on the same day, during the 11th Congress. Nene Pimentel received a majority of the votes cast and was elected president of the Senate. Had Pimentel not voted for himself, no one would have won the election, and a second ballot would have been called.

November 2000 election for president of the Senate
Party	Candidate	Votes	%
PDP–Laban	Nene Pimentel	13	61.90
Lakas–NUCD–UMDP	Teofisto Guingona Jr.	6	28.57
Abstention		2	9.52
Total votes		21	100.00

=== July 2001 ===
An election for the president of the Senate took place on July 23, 2001, on the opening day of the 12th Congress, two months after the 2001 elections. Franklin Drilon received a majority of the votes cast and was elected president of the Senate.

2001 election for president of the Senate
Party	Candidate	Votes	%
Independent	Franklin Drilon	13	54.17
PDP–Laban	Nene Pimentel (incumbent)	11	45.83
Total votes		24	100.00

=== July 2004 ===
An election for the president of the Senate took place on July 26, 2004, on the opening day of the 13th Congress, two months after the 2004 elections. Franklin Drilon received a majority of the votes cast and was re-elected president of the Senate.

2004 election for president of the Senate
Party	Candidate	Votes	%
Liberal	Franklin Drilon (incumbent)	13	56.52
PDP–Laban	Nene Pimentel	10	43.48
Total votes		23	100.00

=== July 2006 ===
On July 24, 2006, Franklin Drilon resigned from the Senate presidency. Consequently, an intra-term election for a new Senate president was held on the same day, during the 13th Congress. Manny Villar was elected president of the Senate by acclamation.

2006 election for president of the Senate
Party	Candidate	Votes	%
Nacionalista	Manny Villar	21	100.00
Total votes		21	100.00

=== July 2007 ===
An election for the president of the Senate took place on July 23, 2007, on the opening day of the 14th Congress, two months after the 2007 elections. Manny Villar received a majority of the votes cast and was re-elected president of the Senate.

2007 election for president of the Senate
Party	Candidate	Votes	%
Nacionalista	Manny Villar (incumbent)	15	68.18
PDP–Laban	Nene Pimentel	7	31.82
Total votes		22	100.00

=== November 2008 ===
On November 17, 2008, Manny Villar resigned from the Senate presidency on the heels of the C-5 Road Extension controversy. Consequently, an intra-term election for a new Senate president was held on the same day, during the 14th Congress. Juan Ponce Enrile was elected president of the Senate.

2008 election for president of the Senate
Party	Candidate	Votes	%
PMP	Juan Ponce Enrile	14	70.00
Abstention		6	30.00
Total votes		20	100.00

=== July 2010 ===
An election for the president of the Senate took place on July 26, 2010, on the opening day of the 15th Congress, two months after the 2010 elections. Juan Ponce Enrile received a majority of the votes cast and was re-elected president of the Senate.

2010 election for president of the Senate
Party	Candidate	Votes	%
PMP	Juan Ponce Enrile (incumbent)	17	85.00
Nacionalista	Alan Peter Cayetano	3	15.00
Total votes		20	100.00

=== July 2013 ===
An election for the president of the Senate took place on July 22, 2013, on the opening day of the 16th Congress, two months after the 2013 elections. Franklin Drilon received a majority of the votes cast and was elected president of the Senate.

2013 election for president of the Senate
Party	Candidate	Votes	%
Liberal	Franklin Drilon	17	73.91
UNA	Juan Ponce Enrile	6	26.09
Total votes		23	100.00

=== July 2016 ===
An election for the president of the Senate took place on July 25, 2016, on the opening day of the 17th Congress, two months after the 2016 elections. Koko Pimentel received a majority of the votes cast and was elected president of the Senate.

2016 election for president of the Senate
Party	Candidate	Votes	%
PDP–Laban	Koko Pimentel	20	86.96
Liberal	Ralph Recto	3	13.04
Total votes		23	100.00

=== May 2018 ===
On May 21, 2018, Koko Pimentel resigned from the Senate presidency. Consequently, an intra-term election for a new Senate president was held on the same day, during the 17th Congress. On a basis of a term-sharing agreement, Tito Sotto was elected president of the Senate.

2018 election for president of the Senate
Party	Candidate	Votes	%
NPC	Tito Sotto	15	78.95
Abstention		4	21.05
Total votes		19	100.00

=== July 2019 ===
An election for the president of the Senate took place on July 22, 2019, on the opening day of the 18th Congress, two months after the 2019 elections. Tito Sotto received a majority of the votes cast and was re-elected president of the Senate.

2019 election for president of the Senate
Party	Candidate	Votes	%
NPC	Tito Sotto (incumbent)	19	86.36
Abstention		3	13.64
Total votes		22	100.00

=== July 2022 ===
An election for the president of the Senate took place on July 25, 2022, on the opening day of the 19th Congress, two months after the 2022 elections. Migz Zubiri received a majority of the votes cast and was elected president of the Senate.

2022 election for president of the Senate
Party	Candidate	Votes	%
Independent	Juan Miguel Zubiri	20	83.33
Abstention		2	8.33
Against		2	8.33
Total votes		24	100.00

=== May 2024 ===
On May 20, 2024, Migz Zubiri resigned from the Senate presidency following public criticisms over investigations conducted by the Senate Committee on Public Order and Dangerous Drugs linking alleged leaked documents of the Philippine Drug Enforcement Agency to president Bongbong Marcos for illegal drug use, and his opposition to calls for constitutional reform via people's initiative. Consequently, an intra-term election for a new Senate president was held on the same day, during the 19th Congress. Francis Escudero was elected president of the Senate.

2024 election for president of the Senate
Party	Candidate	Votes	%
NPC	Francis Escudero	22	91.67
Abstention		2	8.33
Total votes		24	100.00

=== July 2025 ===
An election for president of the Senate took place on July 28, 2025, at the start of the 20th Congress, two months after the 2025 elections. Francis Escudero received a majority of the votes cast and was re-elected president of the Senate.

July 2025 election for president of the Senate
Party	Candidate	Votes	%
NPC	Francis Escudero (incumbent)	19	79.17
NPC	Tito Sotto	5	20.83
Total votes		24	100.00

=== September 2025 ===
On September 8, 2025, Francis Escudero was ousted from the Senate presidency through a motion to vacate. Consequently, an intra-term election for a new Senate president on the same day, during the 20th Congress. Tito Sotto was elected president of the Senate by acclamation.

September 2025 election for president of the Senate
Party	Candidate	Votes	%
NPC	Tito Sotto	24	100.00
Total votes		24	100.00

=== May 2026 ===
On May 11, 2026, Tito Sotto was ousted from the Senate presidency through a motion to vacate. Consequently, an intra-term election for a new Senate president on the same day, during the 20th Congress. Alan Peter Cayetano received a majority of the votes cast and was elected president of the Senate.

May 2026 election for president of the Senate
Party	Candidate	Votes	%
Independent	Alan Peter Cayetano	13	54.17
NPC	Tito Sotto (incumbent)	9	37.50
Abstention		2	8.33
Total votes		24	100.00

=== June 2026 ===
On June 17, 2026, Alan Peter Cayetano was formally ousted from the Senate presidency, following the declaration of a vacancy in the office on June 3 and the installation of Sherwin Gatchalian as Senate president pro tempore and acting Senate president. Consequently, another intra-term election for a new Senate president on the same day, during the 20th Congress. Sherwin Gatchalian was elected president of the Senate by acclamation.

June 2026 election for president of the Senate
Party	Candidate	Votes	%
NPC	Sherwin Gatchalian	13	100.00
Total votes		13	100.00

== See also ==
- List of Speaker of the Philippine House of Representatives elections
