= Senate President Neptali A. Gonzales General Hospital =

Government hospital in Mandaluyong, Philippines

Geography
- Location: Mauway, Mandaluyong, National Capital Region, Philippines
- Coordinates: 14°34′53″N 121°02′39″E

Organization
- Type: Tertiary

Services
- Beds: 300

History
- Founded: June 24, 2021; 5 years ago

The Senate President Neptali A. Gonzales General Hospital is a government tertiary training and general hospital in the Philippines. It is located at Barangay Mauway, Mandaluyong, Metropolitan Manila. Established in 2021, it is named in honor of Neptali Gonzales, a Mandaluyong native and the 13th President of the Senate.
