= Philippine presidential line of succession =

The Philippine presidential line of succession defines who becomes or acts as president upon the incapacity, death, resignation, or removal from office (by impeachment and subsequent disqualification) of a sitting president or a president-elect.

== Current order ==
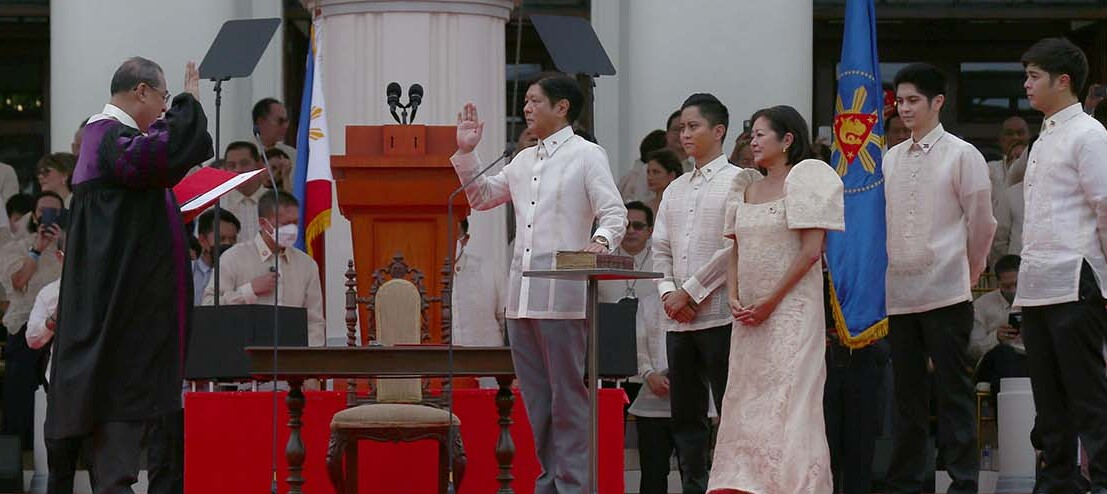
Bongbong Marcos takes the oath of office as the 17th president of the Philippines at the National Museum of Fine Arts on June 30, 2022. Sara Duterte had taken her own oath of office as vice president ahead on June 19, 2022.

The current presidential line of succession to the office of the president of the Philippines is specified by the 1987 Constitution. The line of presidential succession follows the order of: vice president, president of the Senate and speaker of the House of Representatives. In case of death, permanent disability, or inability of these officials, Congress shall, by law, provide for the manner of selection of the person who is to act as president until a president or vice president shall have qualified and the line of succession will change of who those new national officials are.

Contrary to popular belief, the presidential line of succession does not include the chief justice.

=== Current line of succession ===
No.	Position	Incumbent	Party
1	Vice President of the Philippines	Sara Duterte	HNP
2	President of the Senate of the Philippines	Sherwin Gatchalian	NPC
3	Speaker of the House of Representatives of the Philippines	Bojie Dy	PFP

== Constitutional provisions ==
=== Historical provisions ===
==== 1973–1984 ====
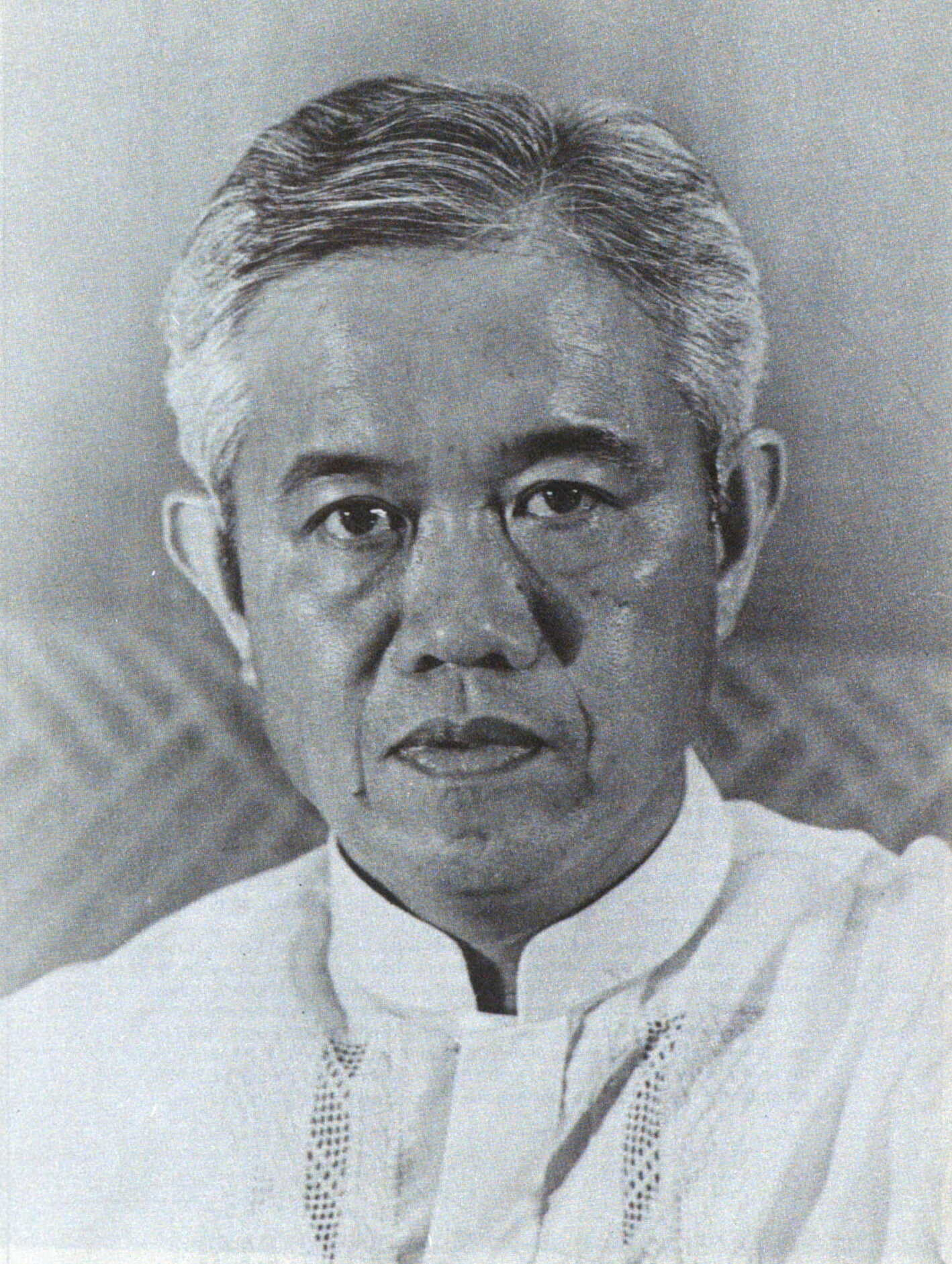
Cesar Virata as Prime Minister was head of the Executive Committee created in 1973 and abolished in 1984. The body could have assumed the powers of the presidency if Ferdinand Marcos, Sr. vacated the office.

Under the 1973 constitution, the Executive Committee led by the Prime Minister of the Philippines was to exercise the powers and discharge the duties of the President, if the president-elect had died, failed to qualify, or if a President had not been chosen. If the Batasang Pambansa, the national legislature, withdraws confidence in the Prime Minister, its Speaker would have presided over the Executive Committee. In the absence of an Executive Committee, the Speaker would be acting President until a new President was elected or qualified. If the presidency was vacated with more than 18 months left in the term of the previous President, the Batasang Pambansa was obliged to organize a special election, with the elected President to serve the unexpired term of their predecessor.

The Executive Committee was created under the said constitution, which should have at most 14 members and at least half of which should be Assemblymen. The Executive Committee was an advisory body assisting the President in fulfilling their executive function.

There was uncertainty regarding the presidential line of succession in the later years of Ferdinand Marcos’ rule towards the mid-1980s. It is implied the member deemed the best performing would succeed Marcos, whose health was already deteriorating. Economic failure also called for clarity on the matter, so in 1983 Marcos himself announced the sitting Prime Minister would succeed him. Among those considered as candidates to succeed Marcos were Prime Minister Cesar Virata, who was Chairman of the Executive Committee, and First Lady Imelda Marcos who was also a committee member. A member of the Committee, former Vice-President Emmanuel Pelaez, lobbied for a constitutional amendment which would allow Prime Minister Virata to be acting president in the event Marcos vacated the presidency, while Assemblyman Arturo Tolentino campaigned for the restoration of the post of Vice- President.

==== 1984–1987 ====
Another plebiscite was held in 1984 which restored the position of vice president, as well as restoring the holder of the position as the first in line in the presidential succession. A vice president should have been elected in a scheduled national elections in 1987, which was never held because President Marcos announced snap elections in 1985. The ratified provisions of the 1984 plebiscite also obliged the speaker of the Batasang Pambansa to act as acting president should the presidency be vacated prior to the scheduled 1987 elections. Corazon Aquino was installed as president when President Ferdinand Marcos was ousted in the People Power Revolution of 1986.

=== Current provisions ===
The following are the provisions for the Philippine presidential line of succession of the current Constitution of the Philippines adopted in 1987.

==== Prior to the start of the term ====
- If a president was elected but failed to qualify, the vice president who was elected will act as president until the president qualifies
- If there was no president elected, the vice president who was elected will act as president until a president is elected and qualifies
- If at the beginning of the term of the president, the president-elect dies or has become permanently disabled, the vice president who was elected becomes president
- If neither a president nor a vice president had been chosen or had qualified, or if both had died or had become permanently disabled, the president of the Senate or, in case of their inability, the speaker of the House of Representatives, will act as president until a president or a vice president is chosen and qualifies.

==== During the term ====
- If the president dies, becomes permanently disabled, is removed from office, or resigns, the vice president becomes the president and serves the unexpired term
- If both the president and the vice president die, become permanently disabled, are removed from office, or resign, the president of the Senate or, in case of their inability, the speaker of the House of Representatives, will act as president until a president or vice president is elected and qualifies
- If the acting president dies, becomes permanently disabled, is removed from office, or resigns, Congress shall, by law, provide who shall serve as president. They shall serve until the president or the vice president shall have been elected and qualified, and be subject to the same restrictions of powers and disqualifications as the acting president

== Succession in practice ==
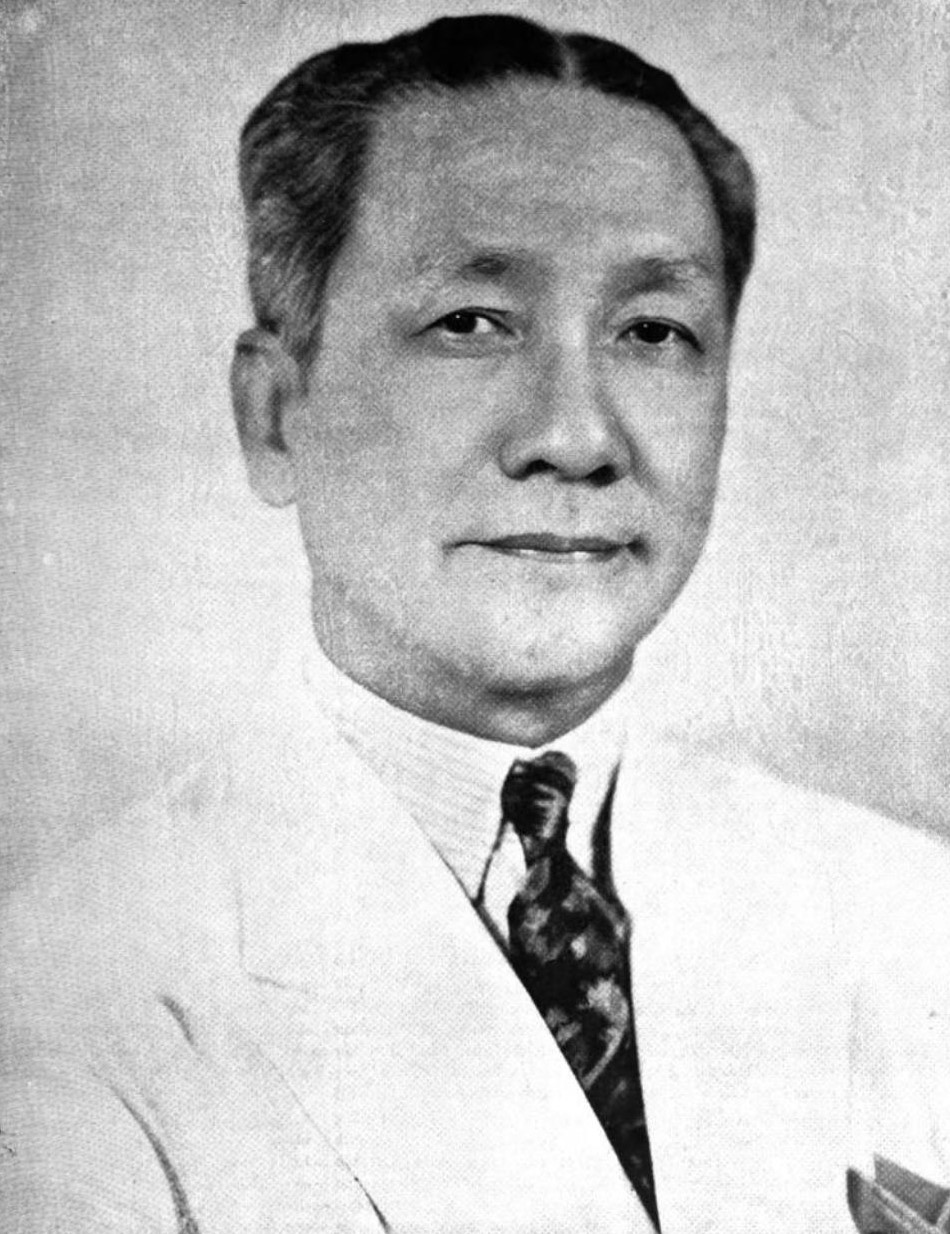
In 1944, following the death of Manuel L. Quezon, Sergio Osmeña became the first vice president to succeed to the presidency

- On August 1, 1944, following the death of President Manuel L. Quezon due to tuberculosis, Vice President Sergio Osmeña took his oath of office and became the second president of the Commonwealth of the Philippines, then a government-in-exile in the United States. As the war in the Pacific Theatre continued, he returned to the Philippines two months later with General Douglas MacArthur and began the campaign to liberate the country. After the war, he restored the Commonwealth government and the various executive departments. Osmeña, who assumed the presidency at age 65, lost to Manuel Roxas in his bid for a full four-year term in his own right in the 1946 presidential election.
- On April 17, 1948, Vice President Elpidio Quirino assumed the presidency, taking his oath of office two days after the death of Manuel Roxas. His first official act as the president was the proclamation of a state of mourning throughout the country for Roxas' death. Since Quirino was a widower, his surviving daughter Victoria Quirino served as the official hostess and performed the functions traditionally ascribed to the first lady. Quirino won the 1949 presidential election and secured a four-year term in his own right.
- On March 17, 1957, Vice President Carlos P. Garcia was heading the Philippine delegation to the Southeast Asia Treaty Organization conference, then being held at Canberra, Australia. Vice President Garcia hastily traveled back to Manila when he was informed of the death of President Ramon Magsaysay in a plane crash in Cebu. Upon his arrival, he immediately returned to Malacañang Palace to assume the duties of President. Supreme Court Chief Justice Ricardo Paras was at hand to administer the oath of office and Garcia became the 8th president of the Philippines. President Garcia's first actions dealt with the declaration of a period of mourning for the whole nation and the burial of his late predecessor. Garcia was elected to a full four-year term in the 1957 presidential election, which was held a few months after Magsaysay's death.
- On January 20, 2001, Vice President Gloria Macapagal Arroyo took her oath of office as the 14th president of the Philippines before Chief Justice Hilario Davide Jr. following the ouster of President Joseph Estrada. She had earlier resigned her cabinet position as Secretary of Social Welfare and Development and joined the growing opposition to the president, who faced impeachment. Estrada was forced from office by the EDSA Revolution of 2001. She was elected to a full six-year term in the 2004 presidential election and was sworn in on June 30, 2004. Following her presidency, she was elected to the House of Representatives, making her the second Philippine president after Jose P. Laurel to pursue a lower office after their presidency.

Successor	Party	President	Reason	Date of succession
Sergio Osmeña	Nacionalista	Manuel L. Quezon	Death	August 1, 1944, 8 years, 8 months and 17 days days into Quezon's presidency.
Elpidio Quirino	Liberal	Manuel Roxas	Death	April 17, 1948, 1 year, 10 months and 20 days into Roxas's presidency.
Carlos P. Garcia	Nacionalista	Ramon Magsaysay	Death	March 18, 1957, 3 years, 2 months and 18 days into Magsaysay's presidency.
Gloria Macapagal Arroyo	Lakas-NUCD	Joseph Estrada	Resignation	January 20, 2001, 2 years, 6 months and 21 days into Estrada's presidency.

== Historical lines of succession ==
=== 1935 and 1943 Constitutions ===
Period	First in line		President	
November 15, 1935 – August 1, 1944	Sergio Osmeña; Vice President	Nacionalista	Manuel L. Quezon	Nacionalista
October 14, 1943 – August 17, 1945	Claro M. Recto; Minister of Foreign Affairs	KALIBAPI	Jose P. Laurel	KALIBAPI
August 1, 1944 – May 28, 1946			Sergio Osmeña	Nacionalista
May 28, 1946 – April 15, 1948	Elpidio Quirino; Vice President	Liberal	Manuel Roxas	Liberal
April 17, 1948 – December 30, 1949			Elpidio Quirino	Liberal
December 30, 1949 – December 30, 1953	Fernando Lopez; Vice President	Liberal	Elpidio Quirino	Liberal
December 30, 1949 – December 30, 1953	Fernando Lopez; Vice President	Democratic	Elpidio Quirino	Liberal
December 30, 1953 – March 17, 1957	Carlos P. Garcia; Vice President	Nacionalista	Ramon Magsaysay	Nacionalista
March 18 – December 30, 1957			Carlos P. Garcia	Nacionalista
December 30, 1957 – December 30, 1961	Diosdado Macapagal; Vice President	Liberal	Carlos P. Garcia	Nacionalista
December 30, 1961 – December 30, 1965	Emmanuel Pelaez; Vice President	Liberal	Diosdado Macapagal	Liberal
December 30, 1961 – December 30, 1965	Emmanuel Pelaez; Vice President	Nacionalista	Diosdado Macapagal	Liberal
December 30, 1965 – January 17, 1973	Fernando Lopez; Vice President	Nacionalista	Ferdinand Marcos	Nacionalista

=== 1973 Constitution ===
Period	First in line		Second in line		Third in line		Fourth in line		President	
January 17, 1973 – June 30, 1981									Ferdinand Marcos	Nacionalista
January 17, 1973 – June 30, 1981									Ferdinand Marcos	KBL
June 30, 1981 – February 1, 1984	Cesar Virata; Prime Minister and Head of the Executive Committee	KBL							Ferdinand Marcos	KBL
February 1 – June 30, 1984	Querube Makalintal; Speaker of the Batasang Pambansa	KBL							Ferdinand Marcos	KBL
June 30 – July 23, 1984									Ferdinand Marcos	KBL
July 23, 1984 – December 3, 1985	Nicanor Yñiguez; Speaker of the Batasang Pambansa	KBL							Ferdinand Marcos	KBL
December 3, 1985 – March 25, 1986	Nicanor Yñiguez; Speaker of the Batasang Pambansa	KBL	Cesar Virata; Prime Minister	KBL	Jose Roño; Deputy Prime Minister	KBL	Macacuna Dimaporo; Speaker pro tempore of the Batasang Pambansa	KBL	Ferdinand Marcos	KBL

=== Freedom Constitution and 1987 Constitution ===
Period	First in line		Second in line		Third in line		President	
March 25, 1986 – June 30, 1987	Salvador Laurel; Vice President	UNIDO					Corazon Aquino	UNIDO
June 30, 1987 – January 18, 1992	Salvador Laurel; Vice President	UNIDO	Jovito Salonga; Senate President	Liberal	Ramon Mitra Jr. Speaker of the House	LnB	Corazon Aquino	UNIDO
June 30, 1987 – January 18, 1992	Salvador Laurel; Vice President	Nacionalista	Jovito Salonga; Senate President	Liberal	Ramon Mitra Jr. Speaker of the House	LDP	Corazon Aquino	Independent
January 18 – June 30, 1992	Salvador Laurel; Vice President	Nacionalista	Neptali Gonzales; Senate President	LDP	Ramon Mitra Jr. Speaker of the House	LDP	Corazon Aquino	Independent
June 30 – July 27, 1992	Joseph Estrada; Vice President	NPC					Fidel V. Ramos	Lakas
July 27, 1992 – January 18, 1993	Joseph Estrada; Vice President	NPC	Neptali Gonzales; Senate President	LDP	Jose de Venecia Jr. Speaker of the House	Lakas	Fidel V. Ramos	Lakas
January 18, 1993 – August 28, 1995	Joseph Estrada; Vice President	NPC	Edgardo Angara; Senate President	LDP	Jose de Venecia Jr. Speaker of the House	Lakas	Fidel V. Ramos	Lakas
August 29, 1995 – October 10, 1996	Joseph Estrada; Vice President	NPC	Neptali Gonzales; Senate President	LDP	Jose de Venecia Jr. Speaker of the House	Lakas	Fidel V. Ramos	Lakas
October 10, 1996 – January 26, 1998	Joseph Estrada; Vice President	NPC	Ernesto Maceda; Senate President	NPC	Jose de Venecia Jr. Speaker of the House	Lakas	Fidel V. Ramos	Lakas
October 10, 1996 – January 26, 1998	Joseph Estrada; Vice President	LAMMP	Ernesto Maceda; Senate President	NPC	Jose de Venecia Jr. Speaker of the House	Lakas	Fidel V. Ramos	Lakas
January 26 – June 30, 1998	Joseph Estrada; Vice President	LAMMP	Neptali Gonzales; Senate President	LDP	Jose de Venecia Jr. Speaker of the House	Lakas	Fidel V. Ramos	Lakas
June 30 – July 27, 1998	Gloria Macapagal Arroyo; Vice President	Lakas					Joseph Estrada	LAMMP
July 27, 1998 – June 28, 1999	Gloria Macapagal Arroyo; Vice President	Lakas	Marcelo Fernan; Senate President	LDP	Manny Villar; Speaker of the House	LAMP	Joseph Estrada	LAMMP
June 28 – July 26, 1999	Gloria Macapagal Arroyo; Vice President	Lakas	Blas Ople; Acting Senate President	LAMP	Manny Villar; Speaker of the House	LAMP	Joseph Estrada	LAMMP
July 26, 1999 – April 13, 2000	Gloria Macapagal Arroyo; Vice President	Lakas	Blas Ople; Senate President	LAMP	Manny Villar; Speaker of the House	LAMP	Joseph Estrada	LAMMP
April 13 – November 13, 2000	Gloria Macapagal Arroyo; Vice President	Lakas	Franklin Drilon; Senate President	LAMP	Manny Villar; Speaker of the House	LAMP	Joseph Estrada	LAMMP
April 13 – November 13, 2000	Gloria Macapagal Arroyo; Vice President	Lakas	Franklin Drilon; Senate President	Independent	Manny Villar; Speaker of the House	Independent	Joseph Estrada	LAMMP
November 13, 2000 – January 20, 2001	Gloria Macapagal Arroyo; Vice President	Lakas	Nene Pimentel; Senate President	PDP–Laban	Arnulfo Fuentebella; Speaker of the House	NPC	Joseph Estrada	LAMMP
January 20 – January 24, 2001	Nene Pimentel; Senate President	PDP–Laban	Arnulfo Fuentebella; Speaker of the House	NPC			Gloria Macapagal Arroyo	Lakas
January 24 – February 7, 2001	Nene Pimentel; Senate President	PDP–Laban	Feliciano Belmonte Jr. Speaker of the House	Lakas			Gloria Macapagal Arroyo	Lakas
February 7 – June 30, 2001	Teofisto Guingona Jr. Vice President	Lakas	Nene Pimentel; Senate President	PDP–Laban	Feliciano Belmonte Jr. Speaker of the House	Lakas	Gloria Macapagal Arroyo	Lakas
June 30 – July 23, 2001	Teofisto Guingona Jr. Vice President	Lakas					Gloria Macapagal Arroyo	Lakas
July 23, 2001 – June 30, 2004	Teofisto Guingona Jr. Vice President	Lakas	Franklin Drilon; Senate President	Independent	Jose de Venecia Jr. Speaker of the House	Lakas	Gloria Macapagal Arroyo	Lakas
July 23, 2001 – June 30, 2004	Teofisto Guingona Jr. Vice President	Independent	Franklin Drilon; Senate President	Liberal	Jose de Venecia Jr. Speaker of the House	Lakas	Gloria Macapagal Arroyo	Lakas
June 30, 2004 – July 24, 2006	Noli de Castro; Vice President	Independent	Franklin Drilon; Senate President	Liberal	Jose de Venecia Jr. Speaker of the House	Lakas	Gloria Macapagal Arroyo	Lakas
June 30, 2004 – July 24, 2006	Noli de Castro; Vice President	Independent	Manny Villar; Senate President	Nacionalista	Jose de Venecia Jr. Speaker of the House	Lakas	Gloria Macapagal Arroyo	Lakas
July 24, 2006 – February 5, 2008	Noli de Castro; Vice President	Independent	Manny Villar; Senate President	Nacionalista	Jose de Venecia Jr. Speaker of the House	Lakas	Gloria Macapagal Arroyo	Lakas
February 5 – November 17, 2008	Noli de Castro; Vice President	Independent	Manny Villar; Senate President	Nacionalista	Prospero Nograles; Speaker of the House	Lakas	Gloria Macapagal Arroyo	Lakas
November 17, 2008 – June 30, 2010	Noli de Castro; Vice President	Independent	Juan Ponce Enrile; Senate President	PMP	Prospero Nograles; Speaker of the House	Lakas	Gloria Macapagal Arroyo	Lakas
June 30 – July 26, 2010	Jejomar Binay; Vice President	PDP–Laban					Benigno Aquino III	Liberal
July 26, 2010 – June 5, 2013	Jejomar Binay; Vice President	PDP–Laban	Juan Ponce Enrile; Senate President	PMP	Feliciano Belmonte Jr. Speaker of the House	Liberal	Benigno Aquino III	Liberal
July 26, 2010 – June 5, 2013	Jejomar Binay; Vice President	UNA	Juan Ponce Enrile; Senate President	PMP	Feliciano Belmonte Jr. Speaker of the House	Liberal	Benigno Aquino III	Liberal
June 5 – June 30, 2013	Jejomar Binay; Vice President	UNA	Jinggoy Estrada; Acting Senate President	PMP	Feliciano Belmonte Jr. Speaker of the House	Liberal	Benigno Aquino III	Liberal
June 30 – July 22, 2013	Jejomar Binay; Vice President	UNA					Benigno Aquino III	Liberal
July 22, 2013 – June 30, 2016	Jejomar Binay; Vice President	UNA	Franklin Drilon; Senate President	Liberal	Feliciano Belmonte Jr. Speaker of the House	Liberal	Benigno Aquino III	Liberal
June 30 – July 25, 2016	Leni Robredo; Vice President	Liberal					Rodrigo Duterte	PDP–Laban
July 25, 2016 – May 21, 2018	Leni Robredo; Vice President	Liberal	Koko Pimentel; Senate President	PDP–Laban	Pantaleon Alvarez; Speaker of the House	PDP–Laban	Rodrigo Duterte	PDP–Laban
May 21 – July 23, 2018	Leni Robredo; Vice President	Liberal	Tito Sotto; Senate President	NPC	Pantaleon Alvarez; Speaker of the House	PDP–Laban	Rodrigo Duterte	PDP–Laban
July 23, 2018 – June 30, 2019	Leni Robredo; Vice President	Liberal	Tito Sotto; Senate President	NPC	Gloria Macapagal Arroyo; Speaker of the House	PDP–Laban	Rodrigo Duterte	PDP–Laban
June 30 – July 22, 2019	Leni Robredo; Vice President	Liberal					Rodrigo Duterte	PDP–Laban
July 22, 2019 – October 12, 2020	Leni Robredo; Vice President	Liberal	Tito Sotto; Senate President	NPC	Alan Peter Cayetano; Speaker of the House	Nacionalista	Rodrigo Duterte	PDP–Laban
October 12, 2020 – June 30, 2022	Leni Robredo; Vice President	Liberal	Tito Sotto; Senate President	NPC	Lord Allan Velasco; Speaker of the House	PDP–Laban	Rodrigo Duterte	PDP–Laban
June 30 – July 25, 2022	Sara Duterte; Vice President	Lakas					Bongbong Marcos	PFP
July 25, 2022 – May 20, 2024	Sara Duterte; Vice President	Lakas	Juan Miguel Zubiri; Senate President	Independent	Martin Romualdez; Speaker of the House	Lakas	Bongbong Marcos	PFP
July 25, 2022 – May 20, 2024	Sara Duterte; Vice President	HNP	Juan Miguel Zubiri; Senate President	Independent	Martin Romualdez; Speaker of the House	Lakas	Bongbong Marcos	PFP
May 20, 2024 – September 8, 2025	Sara Duterte; Vice President	HNP	Francis Escudero; Senate President	NPC	Martin Romualdez; Speaker of the House	Lakas	Bongbong Marcos	PFP
September 8–17, 2025	Sara Duterte; Vice President	HNP	Tito Sotto; Senate President	NPC	Martin Romualdez; Speaker of the House	Lakas	Bongbong Marcos	PFP
September 17, 2025 – May 11, 2026	Sara Duterte; Vice President	HNP	Tito Sotto; Senate President	NPC	Bojie Dy; Speaker of the House	PFP	Bongbong Marcos	PFP
May 11, 2026 – June 3, 2026	Sara Duterte; Vice President	HNP	Alan Peter Cayetano; Senate President	Independent	Bojie Dy; Speaker of the House	PFP	Bongbong Marcos	PFP
June 3–17, 2026	Sara Duterte; Vice President	HNP	Sherwin Gatchalian; Acting Senate President	NPC	Bojie Dy; Speaker of the House	PFP	Bongbong Marcos	PFP
June 17, 2026 – present	Sara Duterte; Vice President	HNP	Sherwin Gatchalian; Senate President	NPC	Bojie Dy; Speaker of the House	PFP	Bongbong Marcos	PFP

== Proposed amendments ==
- 2018: In line with President Rodrigo Duterte's campaign for the adoption of a federal system of government in the Philippines, the presidential line of succession has been a subject of debate within the House of Representatives in the creation of a draft federal charter. A version of the draft proposed that the Senate president to be next in line in the presidential succession ahead of the vice president in an event Duterte would be unable to perform his duties as president during the transition period to federal form of government. House constitutional amendments panel chairperson Vicente Veloso justified the provision as a means to avert political instability due to the ongoing electoral protest filed by losing candidate Bongbong Marcos against Vice President Leni Robredo at the time. The provision was criticized by Robredo herself who characterized the move as "too desperate".
- 2019, 2025: Senator Panfilo Lacson filed a bill that would expand the presidential line of succession which included a "designated survivor" clause. In addition to the vice president, the Senate president, and the House speaker, Lacson proposed that the next set of officials in the line of succession would be as follows: the most senior senator, based on the length of service in the Senate; the most senior representative, based on the length of service in the House of Representatives; and a member of the Cabinet designated by the president. The measure was filed as a contingency in an event that the president, and the three named officials in the presidential line of succession all died or rendered incapacitated such as a hypothetical terrorist attack during a State of the Nation Address. Lacson refiled the said bill under the title Presidential Succession Act at the beginning of his term in the 20th Congress, also providing that, prior to the attendance of the president, vice president, and other high-ranking officials at any public or private function, the president must designate a Cabinet member to be isolated in an undisclosed location.
