= President of the Senate of the Philippines =

Highest-ranking official of the Senate of the Philippines

- Pangulo ng Senado ng Pilipinas
- Seal of the Senate of the Philippines

- Flag of the Senate President

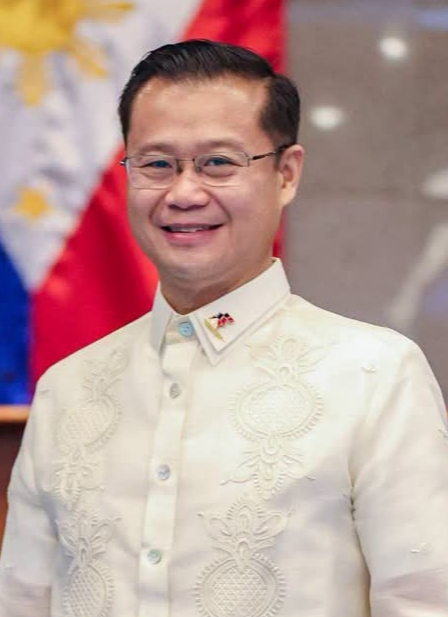
- Incumbent; Sherwin Gatchalian since June 17, 2026
- Senate of the Philippines
- Style: Mr. President (informal; within the Senate); The Honorable (formal); His Excellency (formal, diplomatic)
- Member of: Senate of the Philippines; National Security Council; Commission on Appointments
- Seat: GSIS Building, Pasay
- Appointer: Senate
- Term length: At the Senate's pleasure; elected at the beginning of the new Congress by a majority of the senators-elect, and upon a vacancy during a Congress
- Inaugural holder: Manuel L. Quezon
- Formation: October 16, 1916; 110 years ago
- Succession: Second
- Deputy: President pro tempore of the Senate
- Salary: Vary from ₱325,807 to ₱374,678 monthly

The president of the Senate of the Philippines (Filipino: Pangulo ng Senado ng Pilipinas), commonly referred to as the Senate President (SP), is the presiding officer and highest-ranking official of the Senate of the Philippines and is elected by the current senators from among themselves. The Senate president holds the third-highest rank in the country's government and is second in the line of succession to the presidency – behind the vice president and ahead of the speaker of the House of Representatives.

As of June 2026, the president of the Senate is Sherwin Gatchalian, a member of the Nationalist People's Coalition.

== Election ==
The Senate president is elected by a majority vote of the members of the Senate from among themselves. Since there are 24 senators, 13 votes are needed to win the Senate presidency, including any vacant seats or senators not attending the session. Although Senate presidents are elected at the start of each Congress, there had been numerous instances of Senate leadership elections in which a sitting Senate president has been unseated in the middle of a session. Term-sharing agreements among senators who are both eyeing the position of the Senate president also played a role in changing the leadership of the Senate, but in a smooth manner, through the peaceful transition of power. Three known instances were in 1999, 2006, and 2018.

Newly elected Senate presidents are traditionally sworn in by the youngest senator, known as the "Benjamin" of the chamber, usually one belonging to the majority bloc, as in the cases of Bam Aquino administering the oath of office to Franklin Drilon in 2013, Manny Pacquiao to Koko Pimentel in 2016, Mark Villar to Francis Escudero in 2024, and Camille Villar to Alan Peter Cayetano in 2026.

Unlike the symbolic presiding officers of upper houses in some other governments, the Senate president of the Philippines has considerable power to influence the legislative agenda, and has a normal vote rather than acting only as a tie-breaker, though the tradition that the presiding officer is the last to vote has been maintained. A tied vote in the Senate therefore means that the motion is lost; the Senate president, having already voted in the normal way, cannot also cast a tie-breaking vote.

== History ==
=== 20th century ===
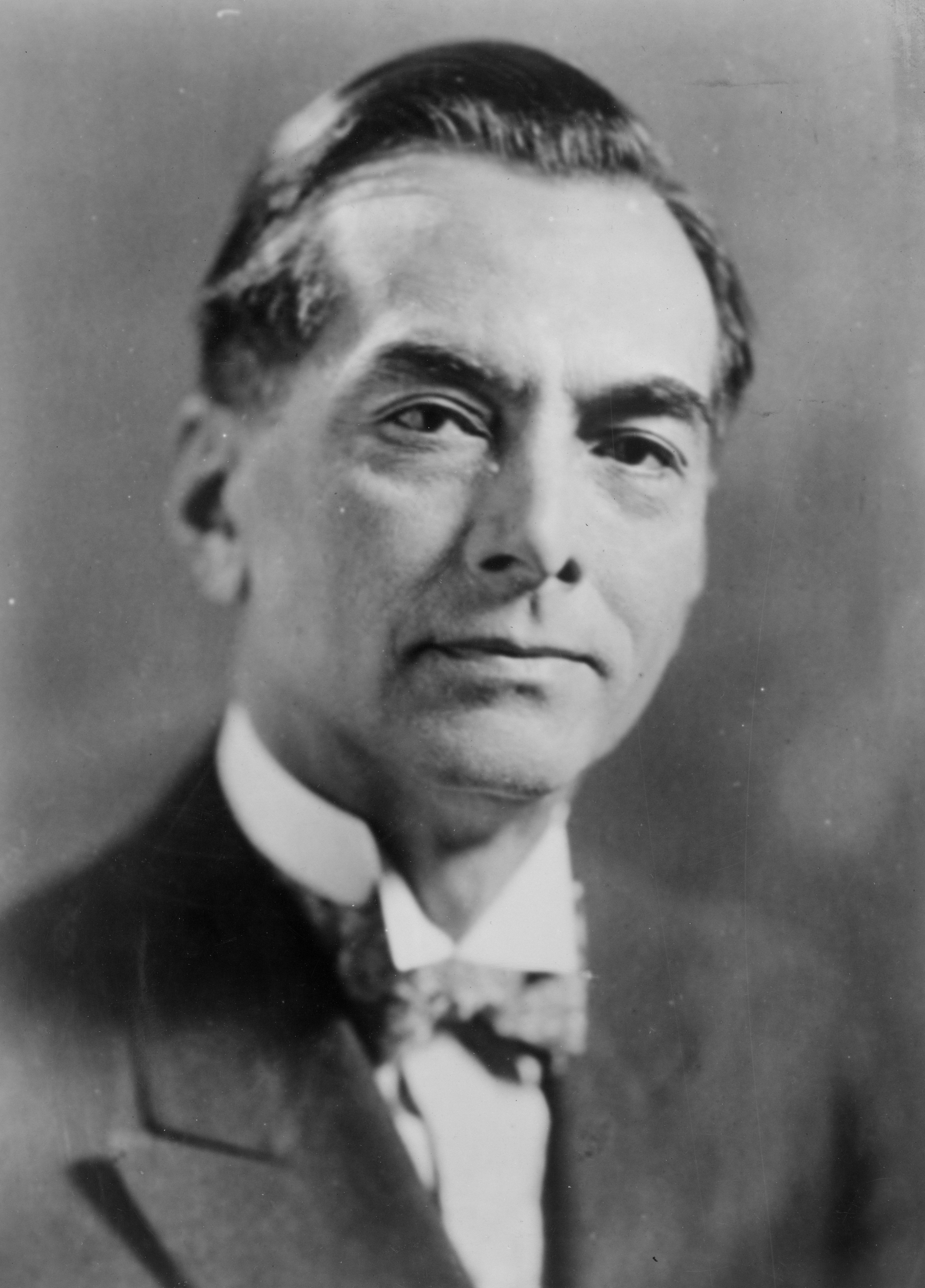
Manuel L. Quezon, the first president of the Philippine Senate, was the longest serving in history, with a total of 19 years in office.

The position was established upon the inauguration of the Senate of the Philippines in 1916, replacing the Philippine Commission as the upper house of the Philippine Legislature. The first Senate president, Manuel L. Quezon, was elected on October 16, 1916 by unanimous acclamation. He served until 1935 when he was sworn in as the first president of the Commonwealth of the Philippines.

The next officeholder was Manuel Roxas, who served from after the bicameral Congress was restored in 1945 until his election as president the following year. Control of the Senate actively shifted between Nacionalistas and Liberals from then until 1972 under a two-party system, resulting in various presiding officers from both parties in a single Congress.

The first known ouster of a president of the Senate of the Philippines occurred in 1949, when Liberal Party senators supporting president Elpidio Quirino’s bid for reelection joined forces with senators from the Nacionalista Party to unseat José Avelino, a fellow Liberal, as Senate president. The move stemmed from the rivalry between Quirino and Avelino over who would become the party’s standard-bearer in the upcoming presidential election. Quirino and Avelino ultimately ran for the presidency under separate Liberal Party factions, with Quirino defeating Avelino by receiving more than 50% of the votes. Mariano Jesús Cuenco was elected to replace Avelino and retained the position despite Avelino’s subsequent attempt to reclaim the Senate presidency during the Second Congress.

This Congress also saw the greatest number of changes in the Senate presidency. Quintín Paredes succeeded Cuenco in March 5, 1952 after a two-month deadlock in electing a new Senate president. Paredes resigned on April 17, 1952 and was replaced by Nacionalista senator Camilo Osías. Osías was later unseated by Eulogio Rodriguez on April 30, 1952 who served as Senate president for a year before Osías regained the position on April 17, 1953, after two Nacionalistas joined 10 Liberals to elect him to the post. On April 30, 1953, senator Jose Zulueta was elected Senate president, serving until his resignation and Rodriguez's subsequent reelection on May 20 of the same year. Rodriguez went on to serve as Senate president for ten consecutive years.

His successor, Ferdinand Marcos, was the only pre-martial law Senate president who switched parties in the middle of his tenure, when he left the Liberal Party after failing to gain its nomination as their presidential candidate for the 1965 elections and ran under the Nacionalista ticket. Marcos was elected president of the Senate on April 5, 1963, during a session in which Senator Roseller T. Lim delivered the longest filibuster in Philippine Senate history in an unsuccessful attempt to block Marcos's election.

Gil Puyat served as the last president of the Senate before his and other senators' terms were cut short after Marcos declared martial law. The bicameral Congress was eventually abolished upon the ratification of the 1973 Constitution, providing for a unicameral legislature, which would be later convened as the Batasang Pambansa.

The 1987 Constitution restored the Senate and the House of Representatives as the two houses of Congress under the presidency of Corazon Aquino, a year after Marcos was ousted by the People Power Revolution. Jovito Salonga, who previously served as senator from 1965 to 1972, was the first president elected by the reestablished Senate in the 8th Congress. He was ousted upon the election of Neptali Gonzales as Senate president, after a rump session was held by only 13 senators, enough to constitute a quorum, while senators supporting Salonga boycotted the session. The ouster was primarily attributed to declining public approval of the Senate’s leadership, as Salonga was one of the candidates in the 1992 presidential election, and many senators felt that a presidential candidate should not preside over a joint session of Congress that would canvass the election returns. Salonga questioned the legality of Gonzales’s election, as the official mace of the Senate was not present in the session hall when an aide from the Office of the Sergeant-at-Arms seized it. A makeshift mace was instead used (a framed seal of the Senate tied by Ernesto Maceda to the mace of the 1986 Constitutional Commission). For a brief period, the Senate had two presidents sworn into office, until Salonga relinquished his position to Gonzales after the session resumed in January 1992.

Gonzales stepped down on January 18, 1993, after fellow senators from Laban ng Demokratikong Pilipino and two senators from other rival parties voted Edgardo Angara into the Senate presidency. Angara was reelected when the 10th Congress first convened, only to be replaced by Gonzales in August 1995. Gonzales resigned the presidency of the chamber for a second time on October 10, 1996 after a coup staged by 16 senators. Ernesto Maceda of the Nationalist People's Coalition was installed in his place and served until January 1998. Neptali Gonzales then assumed the Senate presidency for a final, third time, serving until the end of his senatorial term on June 30 of the same year.

Marcelo Fernan was elected over Francisco Tatad on July 27, 1998, and served until his resignation on June 28, 1999 due to failing health; he died two weeks later. President pro tempore Blas Ople acted as presiding officer until he was formally elected Senate president on July 26, 1999.

=== 21st century ===
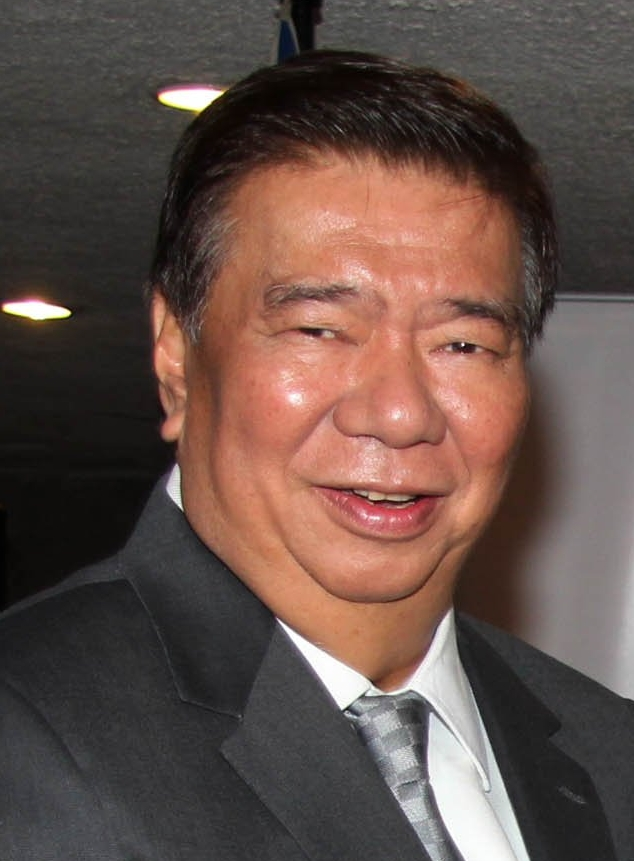
Franklin Drilon was the second, and to date, last Senate president to serve three non-consecutive terms, after Neptali Gonzales.

Ople resigned the Senate presidency on July 12, 2000, honoring a term-sharing deal with Franklin Drilon, who succeeded him, with the former assuming the post of president pro tempore. Drilon was then replaced by Aquilino Pimentel Jr. on November 14, 2000, after 13 senators voted Drilon out following his decision to break away from the Lapian ng Masang Pilipino, the ruling coalition led by president Joseph Estrada, whom he called on to resign, to join the opposition supporting then–vice president Gloria Macapagal Arroyo in light of Estrada being impeached by the House of Representatives. Pimentel himself resigned at the height of the controversial trial of Estrada when 11 out of the 21 senators present voted not to open the second envelope containing crucial evidence that could prove acts of corruption committed by the president.

The Senate had its first president from the Nacionalista Party since 1972, with Manny Villar assuming the position on July 24, 2006 after agreeing to a term-sharing arrangement with Drilon two years earlier. Juan Ponce Enrile was unanimously elected to replace Villar on November 17, 2008, serving until his resignation in 2013 following criticisms of mishandling Senate funds, particularly the disparity in the distribution of his so-called "cash gifts," with 18 senators receiving ₱1.6 million each and six receiving only ₱250,000 each.

Franklin Drilon served a third term as chief of the Senate during the 16th Congress. Koko Pimentel, a member of the ruling party PDP–Laban, was elected in 2016 and remained Senate president until May 21, 2018, when he resigned in favor of, and nominated, Tito Sotto as his successor. Sotto, who was term-limited, was reelected in 2019 and led the Senate throughout the COVID-19 pandemic until 2022.

Juan Miguel Zubiri was elected on July 25, 2022, at the start of the 19th Congress. He resigned the Senate presidency in May 2024 following criticisms from both supporters of president Bongbong Marcos and former president Rodrigo Duterte over investigations conducted by the Senate Committee on Public Order and Dangerous Drugs linking alleged leaked documents of the Philippine Drug Enforcement Agency to Marcos for illegal drug use, and due to his opposition to moves calling for charter change through people's initiative.

On May 20, 2024, Francis Escudero was elected Senate president, with 15 senators voting in favor, following a resolution signed by 13 senators circulating to oust Zubiri. Escudero defended his seat at the opening of the 20th Congress against Tito Sotto, winning with 19 votes to remain president of the Senate. However, on September 8, 2025, during a plenary session of the Senate, Sotto replaced Escudero as Senate president, on his second term as such, as the sole nominee for the position.

To date, no woman has been elected president of the Senate. Prior to the opening of the 19th Congress, Cynthia Villar was reported to be vying for the position. However, she later withdrew from the race and supported the bid of Juan Miguel Zubiri for Senate president.

==== 2026 leadership coups ====
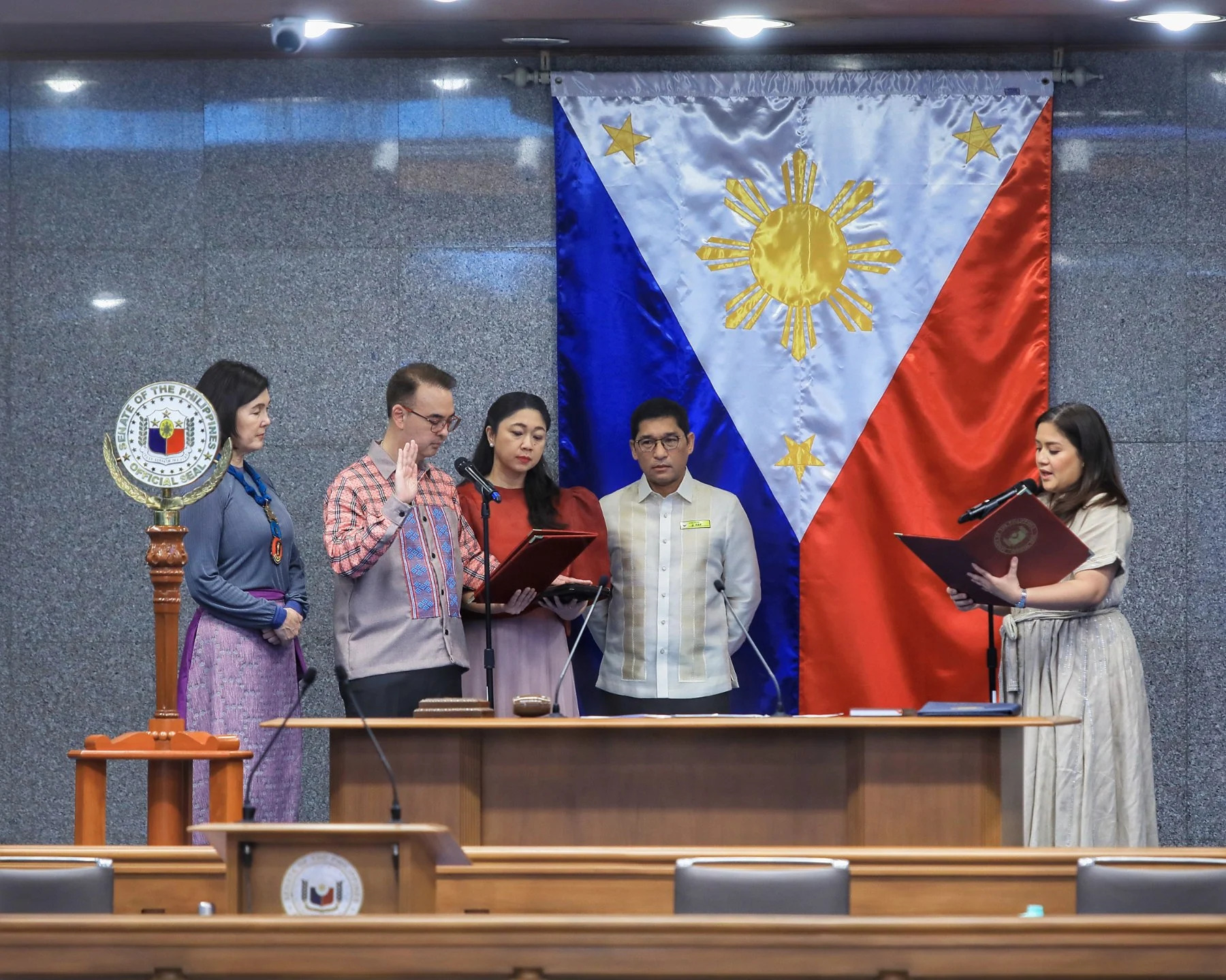
Alan Peter Cayetano (second from left) is sworn in by Camille Villar (right) as the new president of the Senate on May 11, 2026.

In February 2026, speculation arose regarding a possible coup in the Senate leadership. Reports stated that several minority members urged Loren Legarda to accept the position of Senate president to unseat incumbent Tito Sotto, following alleged dissatisfaction among some senators over an unofficial, partial Blue Ribbon Committee report recommending the filing of charges against Senators Joel Villanueva, Jinggoy Estrada, and Francis Escudero regarding their involvement in the scandals on anomalous flood control projects.

According to Sotto, an attempt to install Legarda as Senate president was averted by the majority bloc on February 4, 2026. He also confirmed that no term-sharing arrangements were in place, and that there have been discussions within the majority regarding the possible election of Legarda as the first female president of the Senate before the end of her term in 2028, following deliberations on the 2027 national budget.

On May 11, 2026, Sotto was removed from his position following a leadership change described as a coup. In a vote involving all senators, 13 voted to elect minority floor leader Alan Peter Cayetano as the new Senate president per nomination of Imee Marcos, while nine voted in the negative and two abstained. This comes before the House of Representatives votes whether to impeach Vice President Sara Duterte or not; however, in Cayetano's speech as the new Senate president, he said that the leadership change was not about the second impeachment of Sara Duterte. Following Sotto's removal, he said the coup was not a surprise for him.

Prior to the change in leadership, several senators have spoken about, confirmed, and denied the senate coup allegations. Senator Erwin Tulfo on May 4 dismissed rumors about a possible shift in Senate leadership in connection with the anticipated impeachment trial of Vice President Sara Duterte, adding on May 10 that a senate coup is "not the answer" to stop the impeachment trial of Duterte. On the same day, then-Senate president Tito Sotto confirmed there is indeed a plan to remove him as the leader of the upper house, saying he "leaves everything to God's plan". Hours before the coup takes place, minority Senators Robin Padilla and Bong Go denied claims that the minority bloc is plotting a coup d'état to change the Senate leadership and block the impeachment trial of the Vice President. Senator Panfilo Lacson later confirmed that discussions within the Senate minority bloc regarding an attempt to oust then-Senate president Sotto were active and said they are monitoring the situation. Minutes before the session opened, Cayetano denied rumors of a coup; however, during his manifestation on the Senate floor, he said that the minority bloc had secured enough votes to oust Sotto as Senate president.

Senator Sherwin Gatchalian presiding over the session June 3, 2026 session of the Senate

Politiko previously reported on May 10, 2026 that a group led by Senate minority leader Alan Peter Cayetano had allegedly revived efforts to oust Sotto in connection with Sara Duterte's impeachment proceedings. According to the outlet's sources, Cayetano was reportedly seeking support from Senator Loren Legarda to replace Sotto as Senate president, which could happen on May 11. Senator Legarda was then elected as the new Senate president pro tempore on May 11, following the election of Cayetano as the new leader of the Senate.

On June 1 and 2, 2026, the Senate experienced a two-day legislative impasse when Cayetano and the members of the majority failed to attend the scheduled sessions of those days. The following day, on June 3, Senator Escudero joined the eleven members of the Senate minority to establish a quorum of twelve senators. Upon convening, the new majority motioned to declare all leadership positions vacant, unseating Cayetano and Legarda from their offices, and electing Senator Sherwin Gatchalian as Senate president pro tempore and acting Senate president, as a 13-seat Senate quorum is required for an election of a permanent Senate president.

From June 3 to 17, the office of the Senate president was disputed. Cayetano later conceded the Senate presidency on June 17, stating that, if Senator Joel Villanueva were to join Gatchalian's bloc, the latter would have the 13 votes necessary to be formally elected Senate president. He added that he would no longer claim the presidency and would not obstruct the election of a new Senate president. On the same day, Gatchalian was formally elected president of the Senate.

== Powers and duties ==
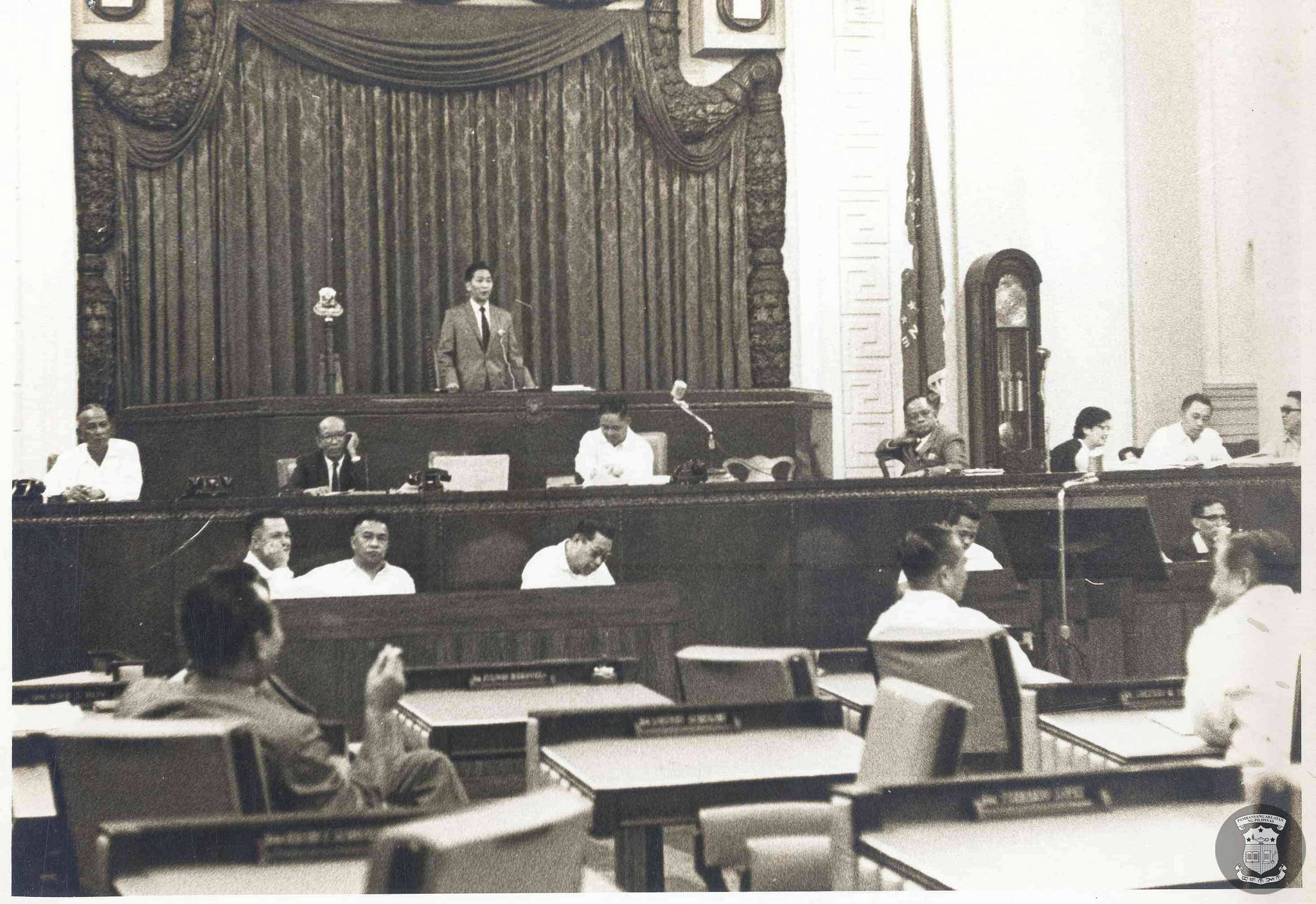
Senate president Ferdinand Marcos presiding over a plenary session, circa 1964

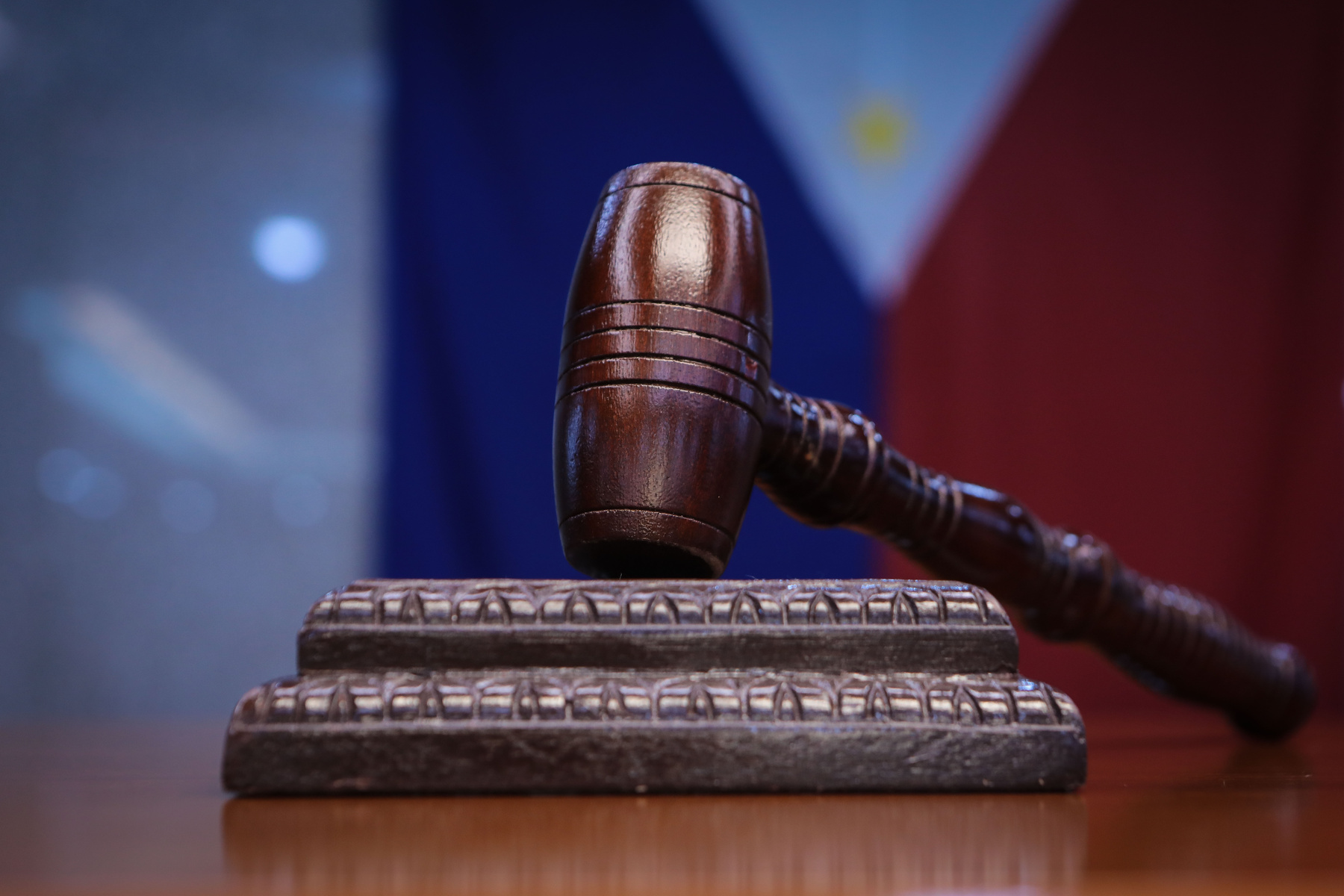
The gavel of the Philippine Senate, used by the presiding officer.

According to the Rule III, Section 3 of the Rules of the Senate, the Senate president has the following powers and duties:

- To preside over the sessions of the Senate on the days and at the hours designated by it; to call the Senate to order and, if there is a quorum, to order the reading of the Journal of the preceding session and, after the Senate shall have acted upon it, to dispose of the matters appearing in the Order of Business in accordance with the Rules;
- To decide all points of order;
- To sign all measures, memorials, joint and concurrent resolutions; issue warrants, orders of arrest, subpoena and subpoena duces tecum;
- To see to it that all resolutions of the Senate are complied with;
- To have general control over the session hall, the antechambers, corridors and offices of the Senate;
- To maintain order in the session hall, the antechambers, corridors and in the offices of the Senate, and whenever there is disorder, to take appropriate measures to quell it;
- To designate an acting sergeant-at-arms, if the sergeant-at-arms resigns, is replaced or becomes incapacitated;
- To appoint the subordinate personnel of the Senate in conformity with the provisions of the General Appropriations Act;
- To dismiss any employee for cause, which dismissal in the case of permanent and classified employees shall be in conformity with the Civil Service Law; and
- To diminish or increase the number of authorized personnel by consolidating or separating positions or items whenever the General Appropriations Act so authorizes and the total amount of salaries or allocations does not exceed the amount earmarked therein.

The Senate president is also the ex officio chairman of the Commission on Appointments, a constitutional body within the Congress that has the sole power to confirm all appointments made by the president of the Philippines. Under Section 3 of Chapter II of the Rules of the Commission on Appointments, the powers and duties of the Senate president as its ex officio chairman are as follows:

- to issue calls for the meetings of the commission;
- to preside at the meetings of the commission;
- to preserve order and decorum during the session and, for that purpose, to take such steps as may be convenient or as the commission may direct;
- to pass upon all questions of order, but from his decision, any member may appeal to the commission; and,
- to execute such decisions, orders, and resolutions as may have been approved by the commission.

The Senate president also supervises the committees and attended its hearings and meetings if necessary and such committee reports are being submitted to their office.

In joint sessions of Congress, the Senate president presides on behalf of the upper chamber, such as during State of the Nation Addresses, where they traditionally sit to the left of the president on the rostrum.

== Residence ==
The Senate president does not have an official residence in Metro Manila where the Senate is holding its sessions but it maintains a residence (cottage) in Romulo Drive, Baguio City.

== Related officials ==
=== Acting Senate president ===
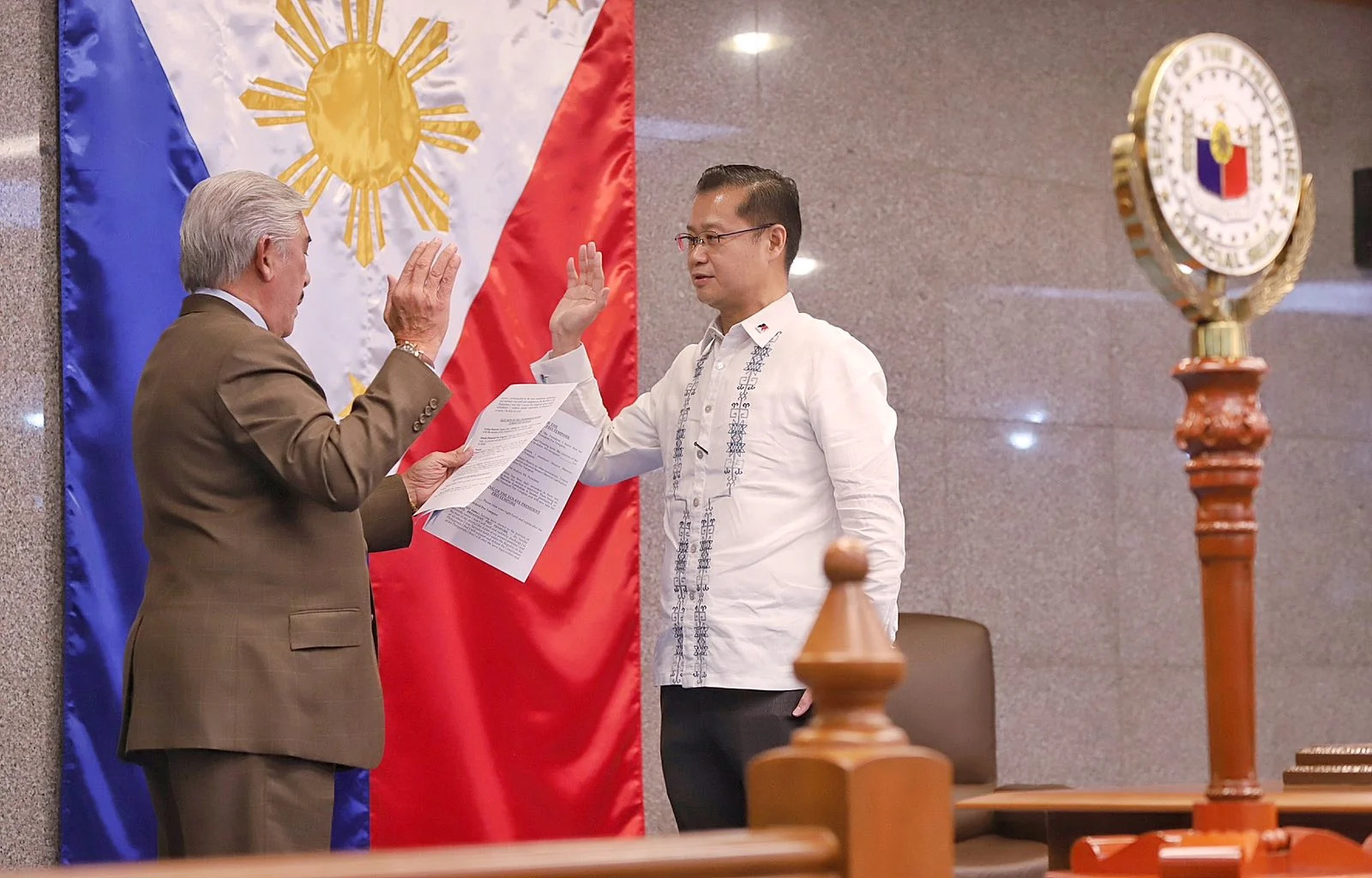
Sherwin Gatchalian (right) is sworn in by Tito Sotto (left) as the president pro tempore of the Senate on June 3, 2026. Gatchalian was later designated acting Senate president.

During the absence of the Senate president, the rules of the chamber provide that the president pro tempore presides over Senate sessions as part of discharging his duties. However, on five occasions in which the Senate president was absent for an extended period (such as during official travel abroad) or had resigned, the Senate designated acting presiding officers to conduct its legislative business.

Since 1930, six senators, including five who were serving as the incumbent president pro tempore (Note: The five incumbent presidents pro tempore who have acted as president of the Senate were Sergio Osmeña, Fernando Lopez, Blas Ople, Jinggoy Estrada, and Sherwin Gatchalian.), have acted as president of the Senate:

- Sergio Osmeña, who filled in for Manuel Quezon during his illness in 1930;
- José Clarín who served from 1932 to 1933 during Quezon's brief leave and trip to the United States over the Hare–Hawes–Cutting Act;
- Fernando Lopez during a trip abroad by Eulogio Rodriguez;
- Blas Ople in 1999 after the resignation of Marcelo Fernan;
- Jinggoy Estrada in 2013 after the resignation of Juan Ponce Enrile; and
- Sherwin Gatchalian in 2026 after Alan Peter Cayetano was ousted from his position as Senate President. (Note: After all elected positions in the Senate were declared vacant in the June 2026 Senate leadership shakeup, Gatchalian was elected Senate President pro tempore and became the acting Senate President. There was no election to elect a new Senate president due to the absence of a 13-seat Senate quorum.)

=== Presiding Officer of the Senate Impeachment Court ===
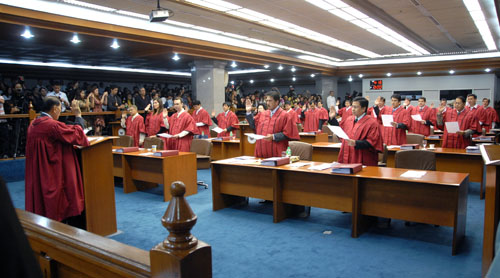
Senate president Juan Ponce Enrile (left) administers the oath to 22 senator-judges before officially starting the impeachment proceedings of chief justice Renato Corona.

According to Article XI, Section 3, Paragraph 6 of the 1987 Constitution, the Senate has the sole power to try and decide all cases of impeachment. It provides that when the president of the Philippines, after being impeached by the House of Representatives, is on trial and the articles of impeachment have been transmitted to the Senate, the chief justice of the Supreme Court shall preside over the Senate convened as an impeachment court. If an impeachable officer other than the president is on trial, the president of the Senate serves as the presiding officer and casts the last vote on the judgment in accordance with the Senate Rules of Procedure in Impeachment Trials.

Chief justice Hilario Davide Jr. presided over the trial of president Joseph Estrada from December 7, 2000, until January 16, 2001, when several senators voted not to open an envelope containing a letter purportedly proving Estrada's guilt on the charges against him. During the trial of chief justice Renato Corona in 2012, Juan Ponce Enrile served as the presiding officer of the impeachment court, becoming the first president of the Senate to serve in such capacity.

After lengthy debates on the constitutionality of the articles of impeachment filed by the House of Representatives against vice president Sara Duterte, Senate president Francis Escudero was sworn in as presiding officer of the Senate impeachment court on June 9, 2025. However, this occurred prior to a formal trial, as a majority of senators in the 19th Congress voted the following day to remand the articles to the House, effectively halting the proceedings. The Supreme Court later unanimously nullified the complaint against Duterte for violating the “one-year bar rule” in the Constitution regarding the filing of cases against impeachable officers. The Senate subsequently adopted a resolution clarifying that the case was not being closed but merely set aside pending the Court’s resolution of the motion for reconsideration filed by the House. A trial in the Senate would have only proceeded if the Court reversed its decision, directed the Senate to conduct one, and the chamber voted to retrieve the case from the archives and act upon it.

Alan Peter Cayetano, who was elected Senate president on May 11, 2026, was sworn in as the presiding officer of the Senate impeachment court on May 18, when it convened for the trial of vice president Duterte following her second impeachment.

On June 3, 2026, the Senate amended its rules of procedure on impeachment trials, specifically Rule II, (Note: According to Senate Resolution No. 430 as adopted: "The President of the Senate shall preside in all other cases of impeachment [and] UNLESS THE SENATE, BY A MAJORITY VOTE OF THE MEMBERS PRESENT, ELECTS ANOTHER SENATOR AS THE PRESIDING OFFICER. THE PRESIDING OFFICER SHALL, for that purpose, be placed under the prescribed oath or affirmation by any person authorized by law to administer an oath.") to allow any senator to be elected presiding officer of the impeachment court by a majority of the members present if the chamber decides to have a member other than the Senate president preside. Senate President Sherwin Gatchalian opened the first day of the impeachment trial on July 6, 2026, and presided until the election of Francis Escudero as presiding officer of the impeachment court.

== See also ==
- List of presidents of the Senate of the Philippines

== Sources ==
- List of Senators of the Philippines
- Roll of Senate Presidents

Order of precedence
Preceded by Vice President; Sara Duterte	2nd in line	Succeeded by Speaker of the House of Representatives; Bojie Dy
