= Blas Ople =

President of the Senate of the Philippines from 1999 to 2000

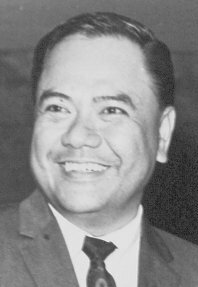

21st President of the Senate of the Philippines
- In office June 29, 1999 – July 12, 2000
- Preceded by: Marcelo Fernan
- Succeeded by: Franklin Drilon

President pro tempore of the Senate of the Philippines
- In office October 10, 1996 – June 29, 1999
- Preceded by: Leticia Ramos Shahani
- Succeeded by: John Henry Osmeña
- In office July 12, 2000 – June 30, 2001
- Preceded by: John Henry Osmeña
- Succeeded by: Manuel Villar

22nd Secretary of Foreign Affairs
- In office July 16, 2002 – December 14, 2003
- President: Gloria Macapagal Arroyo
- Preceded by: Gloria Macapagal Arroyo (acting)
- Succeeded by: Franklin Ebdalin (acting)

Senator of the Philippines
- In office June 30, 1992 – July 16, 2002

Minister of Labor
- In office 1972 – February 25, 1986
- President: Ferdinand Marcos
- Preceded by: Adrian E. Cristobal
- Succeeded by: Augusto Sanchez

Secretary of Labor
- In office September 16, 1967 – 1971
- President: Ferdinand Marcos
- Preceded by: Emilio Espinosa Jr.
- Succeeded by: Adrian E. Cristobal

Mambabatas Pambansa (Assemblyman) from Bulacan
- In office June 30, 1984 – March 25, 1986; Served with: Jesus S. Hipolito; Rogaciano M. Mercado; Teodulo C. Natividad

Mambabatas Pambansa (Assemblyman) from Central Luzon
- In office June 12, 1978 – June 5, 1984

Member of the Philippine Constitutional Commission
- In office June 2, 1986 – October 15, 1986
- President: Corazon Aquino

Personal details
- Born: Blas Fajardo Ople; February 3, 1927 Hagonoy, Bulacan, Philippine Islands
- Died: December 14, 2003 (aged 76) Taoyuan, Taiwan
- Resting place: Libingan ng mga Bayani; 14°31′16″N 121°2′34″E
- Party: LDP (1992–2003)
- Other political affiliations: Nacionalista/PNP (1971–1972; 1986–1992); KBL (1978–1986)
- Spouse: Susana Vasquez
- Children: 7, including Susan
- Education: Manuel L. Quezon University (BA)
- Occupation: Politician
- Profession: Journalist

Blas Fajardo Ople (February 3, 1927 – December 14, 2003) was a Filipino journalist and politician who held several high-ranking positions in the executive and legislative branches of the Philippine government, including as Senate President from 1999 to 2000, and as Secretary of Foreign Affairs from 2002 until his death. Perceived as a leftist-nationalist at the onset of his career in public service, Ople was, in his final years, a vocal supporter for allowing a limited United States military presence in the Philippines, and for American initiatives in the war on terror including the 2003 U.S. invasion of Iraq.

Ople's most enduring role was his nineteen years as Secretary (later Minister) of Labor and Employment during the administration of President Ferdinand Marcos, when Philippine labor laws were overhauled through the enactment of the Labor Code of the Philippines that he had helped author.

== Early life and career ==
Ople was born in Hagonoy, Bulacan on February 3, 1927, to Felix Antonio Ople, a craftsman who repaired boats, and his wife Segundina Fajardo. He graduated valedictorian of his grade school class at the Hagonoy Elementary School in 1941. Upon the invasion of the Philippines by Japan during World War II, he also had been to Hagonoy Institute during his secondary schooling, the teenage Ople joined the guerilla movement and fought under the Del Pilar Regiment and the Buenavista Regiment of the Bulacan Military Area founded by Alejo Santos.

In 1948, he finished his high school studies at the Far Eastern University High School in Manila. He worked towards a degree in liberal arts at the Educational Center of Asia (formerly Quezon College) in Manila. After graduation, Ople pursued a career in journalism. He became a desk editor at the Daily Mirror and the author of its Jeepney Tales column. Still in his twenties, Ople was one of the youngest newspaper columnists of that era. Ople also established a public relations consulting firm.

He soon became known for his nationalist views. He co-founded the Kilusang Makabansa (National Progress Movement), an organization which frequently spoke out on issues of nationalism and social justice in the 1950s. In 1953, he joined the Magsaysay-for-President Movement, a volunteer group supporting the presidential campaign of Ramon Magsaysay, heading its Executive Planning Committee and working as a speechwriter for candidates of the Nacionalista Party. After Magsaysay's election, he joined the government as special assistant to the Secretary of Labor and technical assistant on labor and agrarian affairs.

== Secretary of Labor ==
In 1965, Ople was appointed as Social Security Commissioner by President Ferdinand E. Marcos. In 1967, he was appointed Secretary of Labor and Employment (in 1978 the position was renamed Minister of Labor and Employment). He resigned briefly in 1971 to run an unsuccessful campaign for election to the Philippine Senate, but was re-appointed to his post in 1972, retaining the position until 1986. At the time of his appointment, Ka Blas was perceived as a "leftist Nationalist". His leftist credentials were enhanced when he co-founded, in 1972, the Philippine-Soviet Friendship Society.

As Labor Secretary, Ka Blas was instrumental in the framing of the Labor Code of the Philippines, which codified the labor laws of the country and introduced innovations such as prohibiting the termination of workers without legal cause. Ople instituted labor policies institutionalizing the technical education of workers. In 1976, Ople initiated a program for the overseas employment of Filipino workers. It was during his tenure at Labor that the Philippine Overseas Employment Administration and the Overseas Workers Welfare Administration were created. Ople obtained recognition from the International Labour Organization during his stint as Labor Minister. In 1975, he was elected president of the 60th International Labour Conference of the ILO, the first Filipino to hold that post. In 1983, that organization awarded Ople a Gold Medal of Appreciation. He was a close adviser of President Marcos, though he was not later to be associated with the corruption of the Marcos' government and was perceived as "not corrupt". He created international headlines in December 1984 when he admitted to the press that the lupus-stricken Marcos was incapacitated to the point of being unable "to take major initiatives", and that the President's illness had placed the Philippines in "a kind of interregnum". Marcos responded a few days later by baring his chest to his Cabinet before television cameras to dispel rumors that he was seriously ill or had undergone surgery.

In 1978, Ople was elected an assemblyman of the Interim Batasang Pambansa representing Central Luzon, and reelected in 1984. During the 1986 presidential elections, Ople served as a political campaign manager of President Marcos, who was running against Corazon Aquino. Shortly before the outbreak of the 1986 People Power Revolution, Marcos dispatched Ople to Washington, D.C. to lobby the American government on behalf of the President. Ople was in Washington D.C. upon the outbreak of the revolt, and was advised by U.S. Secretary of State, George P. Shultz, to call on Marcos to resign. Ople publicly reiterated his support for Marcos in the American media in such fora as on This Week with David Brinkley.

== 1986 Constitutional Commission Member ==
Following the success of the People Power Revolution and the installation to the presidency of Corazon Aquino, Ople was relieved of his Cabinet post. Ople returned to the Philippines and immediately attempted to position himself as the leader of the political opposition against Aquino. Nonetheless in May 1986, Ople accepted an offer by President Aquino to serve in the Constitutional Commission that drafted a new Philippine Constitution.

In the 1987 congressional elections, Ople ran a second time for the Philippine Senate, under the banner of the Grand Alliance for Democracy coalition. He was defeated in this attempt, and returned to private life, serving as chairman of the Institute for Public Policy (IPP), a policy research institute.

== Senator of the Philippines ==
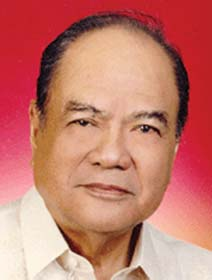
Ople's official portrait as senator

In 1992, he ran again for the Senate under the Laban ng Demokratikong Pilipino. He was elected to a six-year term. In the Senate, Ople served as chairman of the Foreign Relations Committee and on the Commission of Appointments. He became Senate president pro tempore in 1998.

Ople won a re-election for the senate in 1998, under the Laban ng Makabayang Masang Pilipino. In 1999, upon the resignation of the terminally-ill Marcelo Fernan, Ople became the President of the Senate. In that capacity, he was a key proponent of the 1999 Visiting Forces Agreement between the Philippines and the United States, which allowed American forces to enter the Philippines for short-term training exercises. He yielded the Senate presidency in 2000 to Franklin Drilon.

Later that year, he sat as one of the senator-judges in the impeachment trial of his ally, President Joseph Estrada. He was one of the eleven votes during the trial that successfully voted to block the opening of an envelope that was believed to contain proof of the corruption charges against Estrada. Public anger over the Senate vote triggered the EDSA Revolution of 2001, leading to the ouster of Estrada and the accession of Vice-President Gloria Macapagal Arroyo to the presidency.

== Secretary of Foreign Affairs ==
In July 2002, President Gloria Macapagal Arroyo appointed Ople, a member of the political opposition in the Senate, as Secretary of Foreign Affairs in her cabinet. The appointment was with some controversy. Weeks earlier, Arroyo's hand-picked Vice-President Teofisto Guingona had resigned as Foreign Affairs Secretary after voicing disagreement with the plan of the Philippine and United States governments to allow American troops to help combat Islamic terrorist groups such as the Abu Sayyaf as part of the post-9/11 "war on terror". Ople, who had earlier been a vocal supporter of the 1999 Visiting Forces Agreement, was perceived to be more amenable to the plan. In addition, left-wing labor activists denounced the appointment of Ople, citing his Marcos-era role in promoting overseas employment of Filipino workers which, they said, had resulted in abuses inflicted on Filipino workers abroad.

During his stint as Secretary of Foreign Affairs, Ople was at the forefront of the negotiations that led to the deployment of American military forces inside the Philippines, though he insisted that the American troops would not participate in combat missions. Under his watch, the American and Filipino governments signed an agreement that provided immunity to each other's citizens facing charges before international tribunals such as the International Criminal Court. Ople was also a vocal supporter of the Iraq War, and pushed for the deployment of a small Filipino contingent in Iraq. He predicted in November 2003, "Baghdad will be transformed from a symbol of brutal despotism to a new, shining symbol of human freedom. The sacrifices invested in the liberation of Iraq, to which Filipinos made a significant contribution, will be fully vindicated and cherished for all time."

== Death and legacy ==
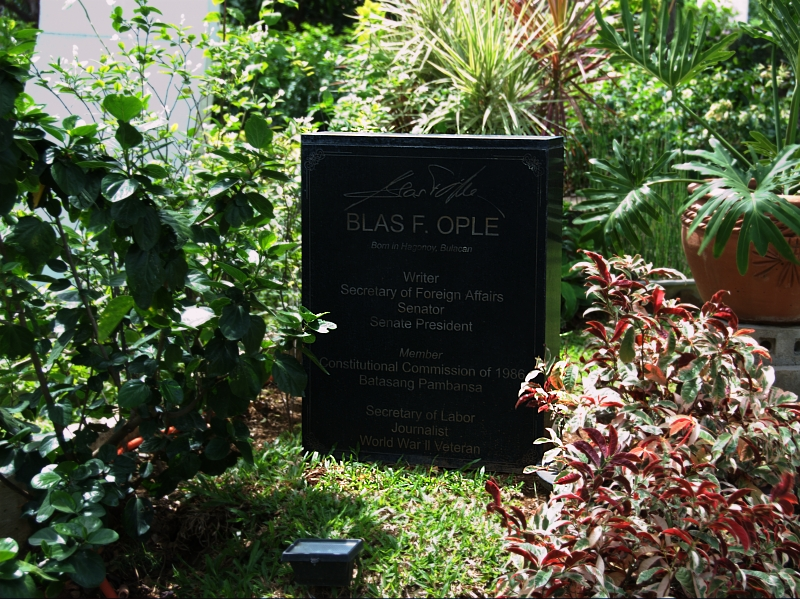
Gravesite of Blas Ople at the Libingan ng mga Bayani

In the months prior to his death, Ople, a longtime chain smoker, had suffered from ill health and often attended international conferences in a wheelchair. On the night of December 13, 2003, Ople had difficulty breathing and lost consciousness while aboard a Japan Asia Airways flight from Bangkok to Tokyo. The flight was diverted to Chiang Kai-shek International Airport in Taoyuan County, Taiwan (now Taoyuan City), and Ople was rushed to a nearby hospital where he was initially pronounced dead on arrival, but given medical treatment nonetheless. Efforts to revive him were futile, and his death on Sunday, December 14, 2003, was announced by his family.

President Arroyo mourned Ople as "an architect of Philippine foreign policy in the finest tradition of enlightened and pragmatic diplomacy", while U.S. Secretary of State Colin Powell hailed him as "one of the pivotal figures of the late Twentieth Century for Philippine history". More critical of Ople, Teddy Casiño, secretary-general of the leftist coalition BAYAN, called him a "political chameleon" who "tried to pass himself off as a nationalist but [was] most pro-American". Nonetheless, Casiño acknowledged that Ople was "a consistent, brilliant and very astute politician".

Ople was eulogized in Time magazine, which recalled his erudition, his skill at political survival, and his trademark "extraordinary baritone". The eulogy also said that at the height of the People Power Revolution, Ople in Washington, D.C. had reported to Marcos in Manila that the President's support within the Reagan administration was falling. Marcos responded by asking Ople to reach out to his contacts in the Soviet government. Ople rebuffed Marcos, and as Time noted, declined "to help make the Philippines a Soviet colony three years before the Berlin Wall fell".

Ople is buried at the Libingan ng mga Bayani. In 2004, President Arroyo named Ople's daughter, Susan Ople, as Undersecretary of the Department of Labor and Employment.

The building housing the former Philippine Overseas Employment Administration and currently the Department of Migrant Workers at the corner of EDSA and Ortigas Avenue in Mandaluyong was renamed Blas F. Ople Building in his honor on February 4, 2004.

== Electoral history ==
Electoral history of Blas Ople
Year	Office	Party	Votes received				Result
Year	Office	Party	Total	%	P.	Swing	Result
1978	Assemblyman (Region III)	KBL	1,369,038	6.54%	1st	—N/a	Won
1984	Assemblyman (Bulacan)	KBL	347,482	14.40%	2nd	—N/a	Won
1971	Senator of the Philippines	Nacionalista	2,654,067	28.18%	14th	—N/a	Lost
1987	Senator of the Philippines	Nacionalista	5,736,911	25.23%	30th	−2.95	Lost
1992	Senator of the Philippines	LDP	6,024,930	24.84%	11th	−0.39	Won
1998	Senator of the Philippines	LDP	9,278,448	31.68%	7th	+6.84	Won

Political offices
Preceded by Marcelo B. Fernan	President of the Senate; 1999–2000	Succeeded by Franklin M. Drilon
Preceded by Gloria Macapagal Arroyo (acting)	Secretary of Foreign Affairs; 2002–2003	Succeeded by Franklin Ebdalin (acting)
Preceded by Emilio Espinosa Jr.	Secretary/Minister of Labor; 1967–1986	Succeeded by Augusto Sanchez
