= Neptali Gonzales =

Former president of the Senate of the Philippines

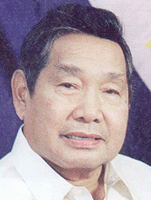
- Gonzales in 1997

15th, 17th, & 19th President of the Senate of the Philippines
- In office January 26, 1998 – June 30, 1998
- Preceded by: Ernesto Maceda
- Succeeded by: Marcelo Fernan
- In office August 29, 1995 – October 10, 1996
- Preceded by: Edgardo Angara
- Succeeded by: Ernesto Maceda
- In office January 18, 1992 – January 18, 1993
- Preceded by: Jovito Salonga
- Succeeded by: Edgardo Angara

Senate Minority Leader
- In office October 10, 1996 – January 26, 1998
- Preceded by: Edgardo Angara
- Succeeded by: Ernesto Maceda

Senator of the Philippines
- In office June 30, 1987 – June 30, 1998

Minister of Justice
- In office February 28, 1986 – March 8, 1987
- President: Corazon Aquino
- Preceded by: Estelito Mendoza
- Succeeded by: Sedfrey Ordoñez

Mambabatas Pambansa (Assemblyman) from San Juan–Mandaluyong
- In office June 30, 1984 – March 25, 1986
- Preceded by: District established
- Succeeded by: Ronaldo Zamora (Note: As Member of the Philippine House of Representatives)

Member of the Philippine House of Representatives from Rizal's 1st District
- In office December 30, 1969 – September 23, 1972
- Preceded by: Eddie Ilarde
- Succeeded by: Post dissolved (Note: Gonzales' term ended when Congress was officially dissolved due to Martial Law.)

3rd Vice Governor of Rizal
- In office December 30, 1967 – December 30, 1969
- Governor: Isidro Rodriguez
- Preceded by: Mario G. Bauza
- Succeeded by: Ruperto C. Gaite

Personal details
- Born: Neptali Alvaro Gonzales; June 10, 1923 San Felipe Neri, Rizal, Insular Government of the Philippine Islands, United States
- Died: September 16, 2001 (aged 78) Makati, Philippines
- Party: LDP (1988–2001)
- Other political affiliations: UNIDO (1984–1988); Laban (1978–1984); Liberal (1967–1978)
- Spouse: Candida Medina
- Children: 4 (including Neptali II)
- Education: Philippine Law School (LL.B)
- Profession: Lawyer, Politician

Neptali Alvaro Gonzales (June 10, 1923 – September 16, 2001), better known as Neptali Gonzales Sr., was a Filipino politician and lawyer who served as the President of the Philippine Senate from 1992 to 1993, 1995 to 1996, and 1998. He previously served as minister of justice from 1986 to 1987, as representative of San Juan–Mandaluyong from 1984 to 1986, as representative of Rizal's 1st district from 1969 to 1972 and as vice governor of Rizal from 1967 to 1969. He also served as dean of the Far Eastern University Institute of Law from 1976 to 1986.

After the Plaza Miranda bombing in August 1971, Gonzales campaigned on behalf of injured Liberal senatorial candidate Jovito Salonga, who then topped the 1971 Senate election. Gonzales ran for the Interim Batasang Pambansa in 1978 as a LABAN assemblyman for Metro Manila (Region IV) alongside imprisoned opposition leader Ninoy Aquino, but failed to win a seat. After the People Power Revolution ousted Ferdinand Marcos as president, Gonzales wrote the Freedom Constitution that served as a transitional charter prior to the current 1987 Constitution.

== Early life and career ==
Neptali Alvaro Gonzales was born in 1923. He graduated class valedictorian in the Philippine Law School. He placed 9th in the 1949 bar examinations with the grade of 92.50%.

He practiced law for 31 years, and was a professor and reviewer in leading law schools. He wrote five law books used by law students and practitioners. He was Dean of the Far Eastern University Institute of Law from 1976 to 1986.

He served as Vice Governor of the Province of Rizal from 1967 to 1969, Congressman of the First District of Rizal from 1969 to 1973 and the Congressional District of the Philippines with three cities and ten municipalities, Assemblyman for the District of Mandaluyong-San Juan (1984–1986) and Senator for two consecutive terms (1987–1998). Before his election as Senator, he was appointed Minister, later Secretary of Justice (1986–1987) by then President Corazon C. Aquino.

During Martial Law, he was the one of its active critics from the opposition and lawyered for some political detainees including then Senator Ninoy Aquino.

He had a distinguished career in law as professor, and dean of the Institute of Law at the Far Eastern University and bar reviewer in different schools.

== Vice governor of Rizal (1967–1969) ==
In 1967, Gonzales ran for vice governor of Rizal under the Liberal Party as the running mate of actor Pancho Magalona. Gonzales won as vice governor, while Magalona lost to incumbent governor Isidro Rodriguez.

== Senate Presidency ==
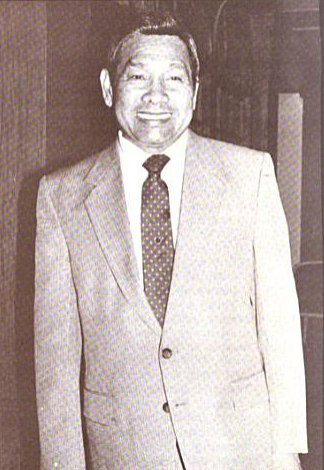
Gonzales as a senator, photograph released by the Philippine Congress, c. 1988

=== First term (1992-1993) ===
Gonzales first served as Senate President, from January 18, 1992 to January 18, 1993. He also served as the Minority Leader of the Senate's Progressive Coalition from October 10, 1996 to January 26, 1998.

Senator Gonzales was the permanent delegate of the Congress of the Philippines to the century-old Inter-Parliamentary Union and the ASEAN Inter-Parliamentary Assembly. He was also a delegate to the International Labor Organization.

=== Second term (1995-1996) ===
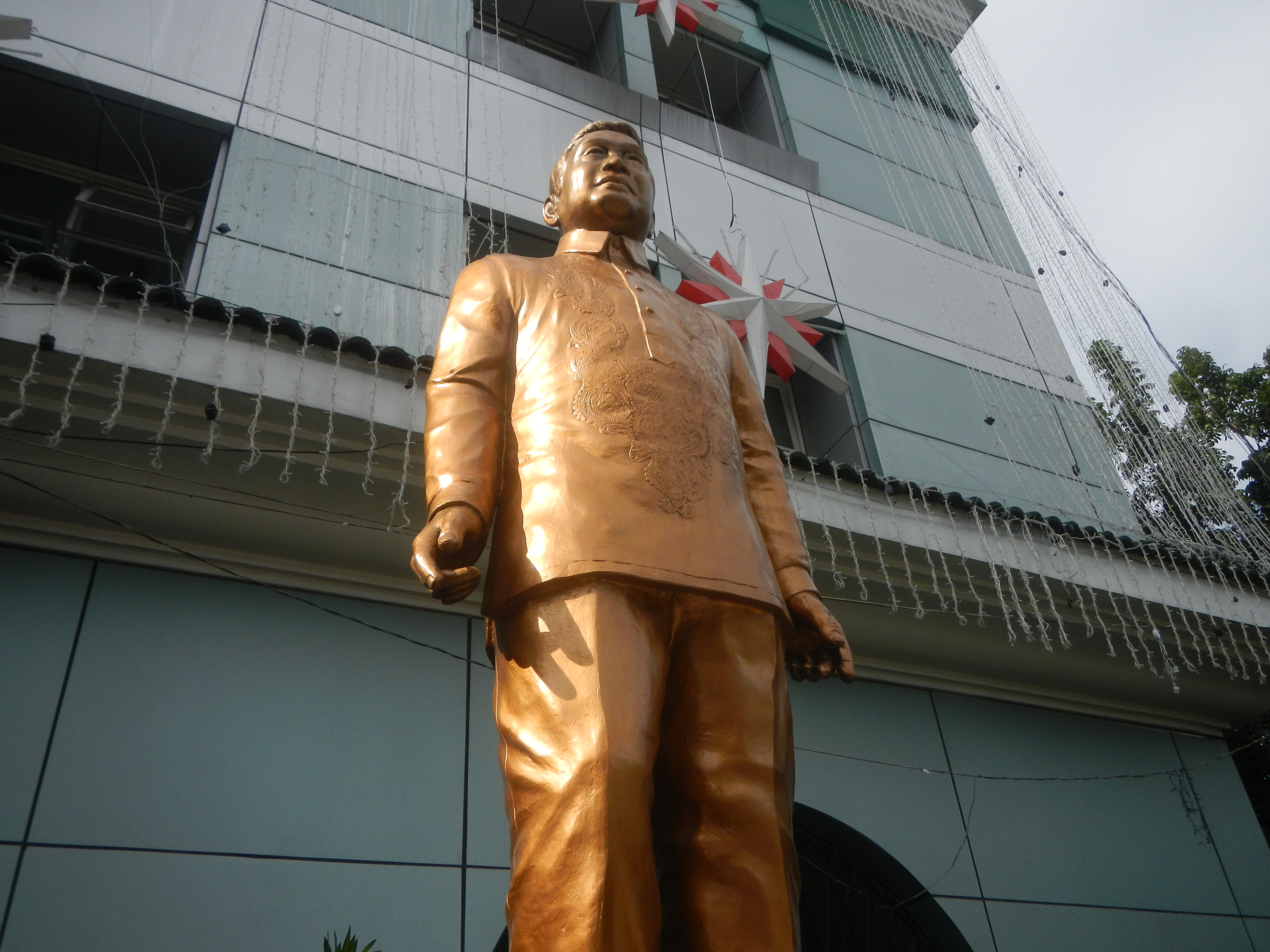
Senator Gonzales' monument in Mandaluyong, Philippines

He again served as Senate President from August 29, 1995 to October 10, 1996.

For his outstanding achievements and contributions in the fields of law, education, and public service, he was conferred the degrees of Doctor of Laws, honoris causa, both by the University of Bohol and the University of Misamis (1987); Doctor of Public Administration, honoris causa, by the Polytechnic University of the Philippines (1991); and Doctor of Technology Education, honoris causa, by the Rizal Technological Colleges (1995). He was also a recipient of the "Dr. M.V. Delos Santos Memorial Medallion of Honor" by the University of Manila in 1996.

Gonzales sponsored the General Appropriations Bill from 1988 to 1992, 1994, and 1998.

As a Senator of the Republic, some of the numerous laws he principally authored/sponsored include Republic Act (R.A.) No. 6735, a law providing for a system of initiative and referendum; R.A. 6826, a law authorizing the President of the Philippines to exercise powers necessary and proper during a national emergency; R.A. 6981, a law providing for a "Witness Protection, Security and Benefits Program;" R.A. 7056, a law providing for synchronized and simultaneous national and local elections beginning 1995; R.A. 7309, a law providing for a victim compensation program to indemnify victims of violent crimes through a Board of Claims; R.A. 7323, a law institutionalizing the "Special Program for Employment of Students" (SPES) during summer and Christmas vacations; R.A. 7655, a law increasing the minimum wage of househelpers; R.A. 7876, an act establishing a senior citizens center in all cities and municipalities of the Philippines; R.A. 7904, a law requiring Comelec to furnish every registered voter with an official sample ballot, voter's information sheet and list of candidates; R.A. 8191, a law prescribing measures for the prevention and control of diabetes mellitus and providing for the creation of a National Commission on Diabetes; R.A. 8247, a law extending up to June 30, 1997, the deadline for the filing of applications for legal residence of illegal aliens; R.A. 8249, a law expanding the jurisdiction of the Sandiganbayan; and R.A. 8291, the Revised GSIS Act of 1997.

=== Third term (1998) ===
He again served as Senate President from January 26, 1998 to June 30, 1998.

Having been elected Senate president for the third time, he holds the distinction of presiding Congress twice in the canvassing of votes for president and vice president in 1992 (election of Fidel V. Ramos), and in 1998 (election of Joseph Estrada).

== Post-Senate Presidency ==
After Gonzales' third and last term as Senate President and his term as a senator ended on June 30, 1998, Gonzales then entered the corporate world by becoming the President and Publisher of the Manila Bulletin and was elected as member of its governing Board of Directors.

== Death ==
Gonzales died of heart failure on September 16, 2001 at the Makati Medical Center. He was 78. His body lies in their family estate in Mandaluyong.

== Personal life ==
Gonzales was married to Candida Medina for more than fifty years and was the father of four children: Myrna, Aida, Rhodora and Neptali II. His family remains a major pillar of life.

In recognition of his strong adherence to family values, he was presented with the "1994 ASEAN Father for Public Service Award" and the "1996 Ama ng Bayan Award" by the Golden Mother & Father Foundation and the "1996 Special Ideal Parents Award" from the Ideal Community Foundation of the Philippines and the Golden Mother & Father Foundation, and the "1996 Golden Parents Special Award" from the Golden Mother & Father Foundation.

He authored books on constitutional law, political law, administrative law and public corporations.

== Electoral history ==
Electoral history of Neptali Gonzales
Year	Office	Party	Votes received				Result
Year	Office	Party	Total	%	P.	Swing	Result
1967	Vice Governor of Rizal	Liberal	—N/a	—N/a	1st	—N/a	Won
1969	Representative (Rizal–1st)	Liberal	—N/a	—N/a	1st	—N/a	Won
1984	Assemblyman (San Juan–Mandaluyong)	UNIDO	101,156	58.16%	1st	—N/a	Won
1987	Senator of the Philippines	UNIDO	10,855,796	47.74%	9th	—N/a	Won
1992	Senator of the Philippines	LDP	6,578,582	27.12%	8th	—N/a	Won

== Awards and honours ==
- 1994 ASEAN Father for Public Service Award
- 1996 Ama ng Bayan Award by the Golden Mother & Father Foundation
- 1996 Special Ideal Parents Award from the GMFF and the Ideal Community Foundation of the Philippines
- 1996 Golden Parents Special Award from the GMFF
- 1996 - "Dr. M.V. Delos Santos Memorial Medallion of Honor" by the University of Manila
