= 1992 Philippine general election =

- May 11, 1992
- Registered: 32,141,079
- Turnout: 24,254,954
- 1992 Philippine presidential election
- May 11, 1992
- Turnout: 75.5% ▼3.3%
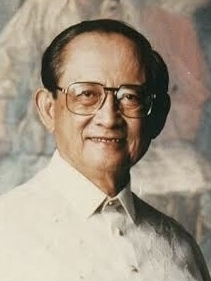

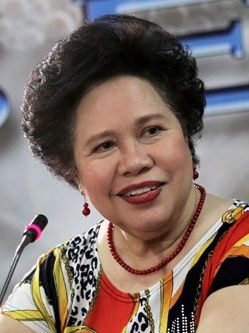

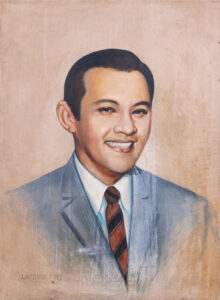
| Nominee | Fidel V. Ramos | Miriam Defensor-Santiago | Danding Cojuangco |
| Party | Lakas | PRP | NPC |
| Running mate | Lito Osmeña | Ramon Magsaysay Jr. | Joseph Estrada |
| Popular vote | 5,342,521 | 4,468,173 | 4,116,376 |
| Percentage | 23.58% | 19.72% | 18.17% |
President before election
Corazon Aquino
PDP–Laban
Elected President
Fidel V. Ramos
Lakas
- 1992 Philippine vice presidential election
- May 11, 1992
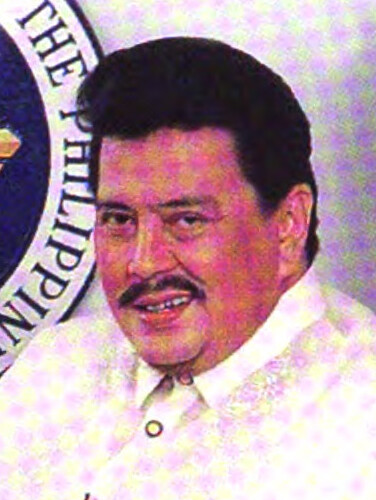

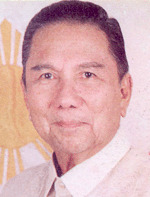

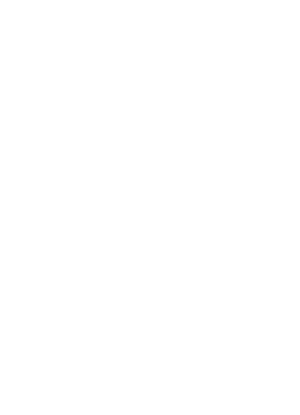
| Candidate | Joseph Estrada | Marcelo Fernan | Lito Osmeña |
| Party | NPC | LDP | Lakas |
| Popular vote | 6,739,738 | 4,438,494 | 3,362,467 |
| Percentage | 33.01% | 21.74% | 16.47% |
Vice President before election
Salvador Laurel
Nacionalista
Elected Vice President
Joseph Estrada
NPC
- 1992 Philippine Senate election
- May 11, 1992

All 24 seats in the Senate 13 seats needed for a majority
| | Majority party | Minority party | Third party |
|---|---|---|---|
| Party | LDP | NPC | Lakas |
| Seats won | 16 | 5 | 2 |
| Popular vote | 124,076,351 | 49,881,921 | 48,789,154 |
| Percentage | 44.95 | 18.07 | 17.67 |
Senate President before election
Neptali Gonzales
LDP
Elected Senate President
Neptali Gonzales
LDP
- 1992 Philippine House of Representatives elections
- May 11, 1992
- 200 (of the 216) seats in the House of Representatives of the Philippines; 109 seats needed for a majority
| Party | Vote % | Seats | +/– |
|---|---|---|---|
| LDP | 33.73 | 86 | +86 |
| Lakas | 21.20 | 41 | +41 |
| NPC | 18.66 | 30 | +30 |
| LP–PDP | 8.82 | 11 | +11 |
| Nacionalista | 3.92 | 7 | +3 |
| KBL | 2.35 | 3 | −8 |
| Coalitions/others | 6.28 | 16 | −39 |
| Independent | 5.04 | 6 | −17 |
This lists parties that won seats. See the complete results below.
| Speaker before | Speaker after |
|---|---|
| Ramon Mitra Jr. LDP | Jose de Venecia Jr. Lakas |

Presidential and vice presidential elections, legislative elections and local elections were held in the Philippines on May 11, 1992. An estimated 80,000 candidates ran for 17,000 posts from the presidency down to municipal councillors in the first general election under the 1987 Constitution. Even though she was permitted by the Constitution to run for a second term, President Corazon Aquino did not stand for re-election.

Retired general Fidel Ramos of Lakas-NUCD won a six-year term as president of the Philippines by a small margin, narrowly defeating populist candidate Miriam Defensor Santiago of the People's Reform Party. Ramos also got the lowest plurality in Philippine electoral history. Santiago led the canvassing of votes for the first five days, but was overtaken by Ramos afterwards. Santiago accused Ramos of fraud and filed an electoral protest citing power outages as evidence, but her protest was eventually dismissed.

The 1992 election was the second time both the president and vice-president came from different parties. Film actor and senator Joseph Estrada won a six-year term as Ramos' vice-president by a landslide victory.

Under the transitory provisions of the Constitution, 24 senators were elected in the polls. The first twelve senators who garnered the highest votes would have a six-year term while the next twelve senators would have a three-year term. Laban ng Demokratikong Pilipino (LDP) got a large share in the Senate race. Television personality and Quezon City Vice-Mayor Vicente Sotto III got the highest number of votes.

== Major political parties ==
- Kilusang Bagong Lipunan (KBL)
- Lakas ng Tao—National Union of Christian Democrats (Lakas–NUCD)
- Laban ng Demokratikong Pilipino (LDP)
- Liberal Party—Partido Demokratiko Pilipino–Lakas ng Bayan (LP—PDP–Laban; Koalisyong Pambansa)
- Nacionalista Party (NP)
- Nationalist People's Coalition (NPC)
- People's Reform Party (PRP)

== Results ==
=== President ===
| Candidate | Party | Votes | % |
|---|---|---|---|
| Fidel V. Ramos | Lakas–NUCD | 5,342,521 | 23.58 |
| Miriam Defensor Santiago | People's Reform Party | 4,468,173 | 19.72 |
| Danding Cojuangco | Nationalist People's Coalition | 4,116,376 | 18.17 |
| Ramon Mitra Jr. | Laban ng Demokratikong Pilipino | 3,316,661 | 14.64 |
| Imelda Marcos | Kilusang Bagong Lipunan | 2,338,294 | 10.32 |
| Jovito Salonga | Liberal Party | 2,302,124 | 10.16 |
| Salvador Laurel | Nacionalista Party | 770,046 | 3.40 |
| Total | | 22,654,195 | 100.00 |
| Valid votes | | 22,654,195 | 93.40 |
| Invalid/blank votes | | 1,600,759 | 6.60 |
| Total votes | | 24,254,954 | 100.00 |
| Registered voters/turnout | | 32,141,079 | 75.46 |
Source: Nohlen, Grotz, Hartmann, Hasall and Santos

=== Vice president ===
| Candidate | Party | Votes | % |
|---|---|---|---|
| Joseph Estrada | Nationalist People's Coalition | 6,739,738 | 33.01 |
| Marcelo Fernan | Laban ng Demokratikong Pilipino | 4,438,494 | 21.74 |
| Lito Osmeña | Lakas–NUCD | 3,362,467 | 16.47 |
| Ramon Magsaysay Jr. | People's Reform Party | 2,900,556 | 14.20 |
| Nene Pimentel (Note: Running mate of Jovito Salonga (Liberal Party)) | PDP–Laban | 2,023,289 | 9.91 |
| Vicente Magsaysay | Kilusang Bagong Lipunan | 699,895 | 3.43 |
| Eva Estrada Kalaw | Nacionalista Party | 255,730 | 1.25 |
| Total | | 20,420,169 | 100.00 |
| Valid votes | | 20,420,169 | 84.19 |
| Invalid/blank votes | | 3,834,785 | 15.81 |
| Total votes | | 24,254,954 | 100.00 |
| Registered voters/turnout | | 32,141,079 | 75.46 |
Source: Nohlen, Grotz, Hartmann, Hasall and Santos

=== Senate ===
The top 12 elected candidates served from June 30, 1992, until June 30, 1998, while the following 12 elected candidates were to serve from June 30, 1992, until June 30, 1995. A total of 165 candidates ran for senator.

Representation of results LDP NPC Lakas-NUCD Liberal Party

| Candidate | Party | Votes | % |
|---|---|---|---|
| Tito Sotto | Laban ng Demokratikong Pilipino | 11,792,121 | 48.62 |
| Ramon Revilla Sr. | Laban ng Demokratikong Pilipino | 8,321,278 | 34.31 |
| Edgardo Angara | Laban ng Demokratikong Pilipino | 8,019,011 | 33.06 |
| Ernesto Herrera | Laban ng Demokratikong Pilipino | 7,219,170 | 29.76 |
| Alberto Romulo | Laban ng Demokratikong Pilipino | 6,824,256 | 28.14 |
| Ernesto Maceda | Nationalist People's Coalition | 6,820,717 | 28.12 |
| Orly Mercado | Laban ng Demokratikong Pilipino | 6,691,132 | 27.59 |
| Neptali Gonzales | Laban ng Demokratikong Pilipino | 6,578,582 | 27.12 |
| Leticia Ramos-Shahani | Lakas–NUCD | 6,367,468 | 26.25 |
| Heherson Alvarez | Laban ng Demokratikong Pilipino | 6,360,898 | 26.23 |
| Blas Ople | Laban ng Demokratikong Pilipino | 6,024,930 | 24.84 |
| Freddie Webb | Laban ng Demokratikong Pilipino | 5,929,426 | 24.45 |
| Gloria Macapagal Arroyo | Laban ng Demokratikong Pilipino | 5,858,950 | 24.16 |
| Teofisto Guingona Jr. | Laban ng Demokratikong Pilipino | 5,830,044 | 24.04 |
| Santanina Rasul | Lakas–NUCD | 5,546,803 | 22.87 |
| Joey Lina | Laban ng Demokratikong Pilipino | 5,064,291 | 20.88 |
| Nikki Coseteng | Nationalist People's Coalition | 5,008,981 | 20.65 |
| Arturo Tolentino | Nationalist People's Coalition | 4,929,625 | 20.32 |
| Raul Roco | Laban ng Demokratikong Pilipino | 4,884,455 | 20.14 |
| Rodolfo Biazon | Laban ng Demokratikong Pilipino | 4,863,752 | 20.05 |
| Wigberto Tañada | Koalisyong Pambansa | 4,492,718 | 18.52 |
| Francisco Tatad | Nationalist People's Coalition | 4,487,896 | 18.50 |
| John Henry Osmeña | Nationalist People's Coalition | 4,408,145 | 18.17 |
| Butz Aquino | Laban ng Demokratikong Pilipino | 4,283,388 | 17.66 |
| Alfredo Bengzon | Lakas–NUCD | 3,964,000 | 16.34 |
| Carlos Padilla | Laban ng Demokratikong Pilipino | 3,828,679 | 15.79 |
| Alexander Aguirre | Nationalist People's Coalition | 3,755,837 | 15.48 |
| Mamintal A.J. Tamano | Laban ng Demokratikong Pilipino | 3,642,828 | 15.02 |
| Jose Concepcion Jr. | Laban ng Demokratikong Pilipino | 3,598,935 | 14.84 |
| Silvestre Bello III | Lakas–NUCD | 3,559,202 | 14.67 |
| Francisco Sumulong | Lakas–NUCD | 3,167,838 | 13.06 |
| Estelito Mendoza | Nationalist People's Coalition | 3,122,467 | 12.87 |
| Victor Ziga | Koalisyong Pambansa | 3,151,251 | 12.99 |
| Sotero Laurel | Nacionalista Party | 3,002,874 | 12.38 |
| Francisco Chavez | Lakas–NUCD | 2,948,912 | 12.16 |
| Ruben Torres | Lakas–NUCD | 2,737,112 | 11.28 |
| Rafael Recto | Kilusang Bagong Lipunan | 2,726,189 | 11.24 |
| Florencio Abad | Koalisyong Pambansa | 2,494,643 | 10.29 |
| Narciso Monfort | Laban ng Demokratikong Pilipino | 2,483,459 | 10.24 |
| Augusto Pangan | Kilusang Bagong Lipunan | 2,408,185 | 9.93 |
| Eduardo Pilapil | Lakas–NUCD | 2,065,900 | 8.52 |
| RJ Jacinto | Lakas–NUCD | 1,873,910 | 7.73 |
| Eddie Ilarde | Nacionalista Party | 1,800,077 | 7.42 |
| Arsenio Yulo Jr. | Lakas–NUCD | 1,774,931 | 7.32 |
| Gerardo Espina Sr. | Nationalist People's Coalition | 1,755,120 | 7.24 |
| Nemesio Prudente | Koalisyong Pambansa | 1,747,569 | 7.20 |
| Guillermo Carague | Lakas–NUCD | 1,743,896 | 7.19 |
| Wencelito Andanar | Laban ng Demokratikong Pilipino | 1,711,611 | 7.06 |
| Buddy Gomez | Lakas–NUCD | 1,696,311 | 6.99 |
| Adolfo Azcuna | Lakas–NUCD | 1,640,220 | 6.76 |
| Jose Tamayo | Nationalist People's Coalition | 1,634,268 | 6.74 |
| Ramon Villarama Jr. | Laban ng Demokratikong Pilipino | 1,629,846 | 6.72 |
| Homobono Adaza | Nacionalista Party | 1,551,366 | 6.40 |
| Vincent Crisologo | Nacionalista Party | 1,551,068 | 6.39 |
| Manuel Morato | Lakas–NUCD | 1,516,715 | 6.25 |
| Rodrigo Gutang | Laban ng Demokratikong Pilipino | 1,508,552 | 6.22 |
| Ruben Ancheta | Nationalist People's Coalition | 1,506,700 | 6.21 |
| Vivian Hultman | Nationalist People's Coalition | 1,459,535 | 6.02 |
| Leonor Luciano | Laban ng Demokratikong Pilipino | 1,445,179 | 5.96 |
| Aurelio Periquet | Lakas–NUCD | 1,243,438 | 5.13 |
| Vicente Rivera Jr. | Nationalist People's Coalition | 1,177,056 | 4.85 |
| Ramon Orosa | Nacionalista Party | 1,164,990 | 4.80 |
| Gerry Geronimo | Nationalist People's Coalition | 1,154,934 | 4.76 |
| Sanchez Ali | Lakas–NUCD | 1,073,750 | 4.43 |
| Lorna Verano-Yap | Koalisyong Pambansa | 1,050,304 | 4.33 |
| Felix Brawner Jr. | Nationalist People's Coalition | 1,036,963 | 4.28 |
| Zosimo Paredes | Nationalist People's Coalition | 1,029,813 | 4.25 |
| Leonardo Quisumbing | Lakas–NUCD | 1,021,627 | 4.21 |
| Rod Navarro | Kilusang Bagong Lipunan | 966,823 | 3.99 |
| Elsa Payumo | Nationalist People's Coalition | 936,926 | 3.86 |
| Fortunato Abat | People's Reform Party | 928,417 | 3.83 |
| Antonio Leviste | People's Reform Party | 919,229 | 3.79 |
| Katrina Legarda | Nationalist People's Coalition | 914,763 | 3.77 |
| Julio Cesar Climaco | Nationalist People's Coalition | 882,680 | 3.64 |
| Rufus Rodriguez | Nationalist People's Coalition | 812,144 | 3.35 |
| Macapanton Abbas | Koalisyong Pambansa | 806,434 | 3.32 |
| Wilson Gamboa Sr. | Nacionalista Party | 803,995 | 3.31 |
| Blo Umpar Adiong | Nationalist People's Coalition | 762,688 | 3.14 |
| Johnny Wilson | Kilusang Bagong Lipunan | 753,627 | 3.11 |
| Jose Malvar Romero Jr. | Lakas–NUCD | 739,919 | 3.05 |
| Marietta Corazon Primicias-Goco | Lakas–NUCD | 737,676 | 3.04 |
| Reynaldo San Juan | Koalisyong Pambansa | 729,610 | 3.01 |
| Ramon Garcia | Koalisyong Pambansa | 717,341 | 2.96 |
| Israel Bocobo | Lakas–NUCD | 707,568 | 2.92 |
| Rogelio Arienda | Nacionalista Party | 704,450 | 2.90 |
| Jose Villegas Jr. | Lakas–NUCD | 688,718 | 2.84 |
| Jesus Antonio Carpio | Koalisyong Pambansa | 668,746 | 2.76 |
| James Barbers | Kilusang Bagong Lipunan | 664,019 | 2.74 |
| Manuel Barcelona Jr. | Nationalist People's Coalition | 618,539 | 2.55 |
| Jaime Cura | Lakas–NUCD | 612,363 | 2.52 |
| Conrado Manicad | Lakas–NUCD | 606,577 | 2.50 |
| Fernando Barrican | Nationalist People's Coalition | 602,169 | 2.48 |
| Mario Leviste | Nationalist People's Coalition | 556,375 | 2.29 |
| Jose Lopez | Lakas–NUCD | 543,186 | 2.24 |
| Alejandro Fider | Nationalist People's Coalition | 507,580 | 2.09 |
| Jonathan Rivera | People's Reform Party | 502,858 | 2.07 |
| Miguel Acebedo | Koalisyong Pambansa | 477,778 | 1.97 |
| Elfren Cruz | Koalisyong Pambansa | 461,371 | 1.90 |
| Esteban Osmeña | Nacionalista Party | 447,196 | 1.84 |
| Vicente Piccio Jr. | Kilusang Bagong Lipunan | 439,995 | 1.81 |
| Marcelino Arias | Nacionalista Party | 428,716 | 1.77 |
| Mariano Reyes | People's Reform Party | 414,577 | 1.71 |
| Doroteo Salazar | Nacionalista Party | 414,061 | 1.71 |
| Arturo Padua | Kilusang Bagong Lipunan | 413,123 | 1.70 |
| Cristin Abasolo Jr. | People's Reform Party | 409,905 | 1.69 |
| Oliver Lozano | Kilusang Bagong Lipunan | 407,538 | 1.68 |
| Abdullah Madale | People's Reform Party | 391,723 | 1.62 |
| Jose Cordova | People's Reform Party | 379,383 | 1.56 |
| Nora Daza | Nacionalista Party | 379,157 | 1.56 |
| Josephus Ramas | Kilusang Bagong Lipunan | 378,451 | 1.56 |
| Dante de Guzman | People's Reform Party | 376,327 | 1.55 |
| Mariano Santiago | Nacionalista Party | 373,161 | 1.54 |
| Carlos Cajelo | People's Reform Party | 370,901 | 1.53 |
| Alfredo Lamen | Kilusang Bagong Lipunan | 349,796 | 1.44 |
| Camilo Diel Jr. | Koalisyong Pambansa | 345,728 | 1.43 |
| Edgardo Abenina | Nacionalista Party | 342,908 | 1.41 |
| Melchor Ines | People's Reform Party | 337,449 | 1.39 |
| Ramon Tagle | Koalisyong Pambansa | 326,153 | 1.34 |
| Albert Umali | People's Reform Party | 319,842 | 1.32 |
| Florangel Rosario-Braid | Koalisyong Pambansa | 310,953 | 1.28 |
| Simeon Alejandro | Kilusang Bagong Lipunan | 308,618 | 1.27 |
| Rommel Corro | Kilusang Bagong Lipunan | 307,832 | 1.27 |
| Antonio Policarpio | People's Reform Party | 299,538 | 1.23 |
| Renato Ecarma | People's Reform Party | 291,236 | 1.20 |
| Salvador Panelo | Kilusang Bagong Lipunan | 289,416 | 1.19 |
| Jaime Echevarria | Kilusang Bagong Lipunan | 287,342 | 1.18 |
| Pacifico Lopez de Leon | Kilusang Bagong Lipunan | 283,236 | 1.17 |
| Ponciano Subido | Koalisyong Pambansa | 270,608 | 1.12 |
| Jaime Muyargas | People's Reform Party | 258,711 | 1.07 |
| Jesus Martinez | Kilusang Bagong Lipunan | 257,276 | 1.06 |
| Abdul Sarip Macmod | Kilusang Bagong Lipunan | 250,548 | 1.03 |
| Roger Panotes | Nacionalista Party | 242,543 | 1.00 |
| Raul Contreras | Koalisyong Pambansa | 224,004 | 0.92 |
| Efren Sumajit | People's Reform Party | 215,563 | 0.89 |
| Oscar Morado | Koalisyong Pambansa | 203,859 | 0.84 |
| Leonora Petines | Kilusang Bagong Lipunan | 199,718 | 0.82 |
| Miguel Lopez Jr. | Independent | 199,593 | 0.82 |
| Madrino Muñoz | Kilusang Bagong Lipunan | 199,359 | 0.82 |
| Gerardo del Mundo | Koalisyong Pambansa | 197,249 | 0.81 |
| Crisostomo Vitug | Nacionalista Party | 193,222 | 0.80 |
| Wilfredo Rafols | Koalisyong Pambansa | 186,004 | 0.77 |
| Elpidio Valera | Kilusang Bagong Lipunan | 185,845 | 0.77 |
| Amado Gat Inciong | Nacionalista Party | 183,446 | 0.76 |
| Hjalmar Quintana | Nacionalista Party | 165,212 | 0.68 |
| Luis Garchitorena | Kilusang Bagong Lipunan | 158,500 | 0.65 |
| Jovencio Kintanar | Partido ng Masang Pilipino | 158,200 | 0.65 |
| Ramon Maronilla | Nacionalista Party | 156,138 | 0.64 |
| Bonifacio Tupaz | Nacionalista Party | 154,939 | 0.64 |
| Jose Tumbokon | Kilusang Bagong Lipunan | 151,748 | 0.63 |
| Benjamin Nuega | Kilusang Bagong Lipunan | 144,064 | 0.59 |
| Norberto Romualdez III | Nacionalista Party | 141,741 | 0.58 |
| Genaro Mabasa | Koalisyong Pambansa | 133,677 | 0.55 |
| Alfredo de Gracia | Kilusang Bagong Lipunan | 116,981 | 0.48 |
| Gonzalo Villa | Nacionalista Party | 111,753 | 0.46 |
| Juanito Arribas | Independent | 105,671 | 0.44 |
| Horacio Marasigan | Nacionalista Party | 105,172 | 0.43 |
| Alfredo Zerrudo | Koalisyong Pambansa | 96,614 | 0.40 |
| Dominico Casas | People's Reform Party | 90,804 | 0.37 |
| Antonio Fa. Muyot | Nacionalista Party | 61,339 | 0.25 |
| Conrado Leonardo | Partido ng Masang Pilipino | 48,337 | 0.20 |
| Rolando Quintos | Partido ng Masang Pilipino | 38,581 | 0.16 |
| Ruperto Martin | Koalisyong Pambansa | 11,784 | 0.05 |
| Datu Ray Ibrahim Uy | Nacionalista Party | 6,278 | 0.03 |
| Melchor Chavez (Note: Disqualified but remained on the ballot) | Koalisyong Pambansa | 0 | 0.00 |
| Ceferino Padua (Note: Withdrew but remained on the ballot) | Koalisyong Pambansa | 0 | 0.00 |
| Total | | 276,150,008 | 100.00 |
| Total votes | | 24,254,954 | – |
| Registered voters/turnout | | 32,141,079 | 75.46 |

=== House of Representatives ===
| Party | Votes | % | +/– | Seats | +/– |
|---|---|---|---|---|---|
| Laban ng Demokratikong Pilipino | 6,286,922 | 33.73 | New | 86 | New |
| Lakas–NUCD | 3,951,144 | 21.20 | New | 41 | New |
| Nationalist People's Coalition | 3,478,780 | 18.66 | New | 30 | New |
| Koalisyong Pambansa | 1,644,568 | 8.82 | New | 11 | New |
| Nacionalista Party | 730,696 | 3.92 | −3.27 | 7 | +3 |
| Kilusang Bagong Lipunan | 438,577 | 2.35 | −1.75 | 3 | −8 |
| Coalitions | 679,411 | 3.64 | New | 14 | New |
| Others | 491,970 | 2.64 | New | 2 | New |
| Independent | 938,558 | 5.04 | −8.21 | 6 | −17 |
| Appointed seats | | | | 16 | 0 |
| Total | 18,640,626 | 100.00 | – | 216 | +2 |
Source: Nohlen, Grotz and Hartmann and Teehankee

=== Local elections ===
Local elections for all positions above the barangay level, but below the regional level, were held on this day.

==== Gubernatorial elections ====
The following are the results of the gubernatorial elections by party:

| Party | Seats |
|---|---|
| Laban ng Demokratikong Pilipino | 26 |
| Lakas–NUCD | 18 |
| Nationalist People's Coalition | 13 |
| Koalisyong Pambansa | 5 |
| Lakas–NUCD/Koalisyong Pambansa | 2 |
| Koalisyong Pambansa/Lakas–NUCD/Nacionalista Party | 1 |
| Nacionalista Party | 1 |
| Nacionalista Party/Grand Alliance for Democracy/Kilusang Bagong Lipunan/Nationalist People's Coalition | 1 |
| Nacionalista Party/Nationalist People's Coalition | 1 |
| Nationalist People's Coalition/Bagong Lakas ng Nueva Ecija | 1 |
| Nationalist People's Coalition/Independent Nacionalistas and Allies | 1 |
| Nationalist People's Coalition/Kilusang Bagong Lipunan/Nacionalista Party | 1 |
| Independents | 2 |
| Total | 73 |
Source: Commission on Elections

The following are the results of the gubernatorial elections by province:

| Province | Elected governor | Party |
|---|---|---|
| Abra | Vicente Valera | Lakas |
| Agusan del Norte | Eduardo Rama Sr. | NPC |
| Agusan del Sur | Democrito Plaza | LDP |
| Aklan | Corazon Cabagnot | NPC |
| Albay | Romeo Salalima | NPC |
| Antique | Jovito Plameras Jr. | Lakas |
| Aurora | Edgardo Ong | LDP |
| Basilan | Gerry Salapuddin | LDP |
| Bataan | Tet Garcia | NPC |
| Batanes | Telesforo Castillejos | LDP |
| Batangas | Vicente Mayo | LDP |
| Benguet | Jaime Paul Panganiban | LP–PDP |
| Bohol | David Tirol | NPC |
| Bukidnon | Carlos Fortich | Lakas |
| Bulacan | Roberto Pagdanganan | LDP |
| Cagayan | Rodolfo Aguinaldo | NPC |
| Camarines Norte | Roy Padilla Jr. | NPC |
| Camarines Sur | Jose Bulaong | Nacionalista/NPC |
| Camiguin | Antonio Gallardo | Lakas/LP–PDP |
| Capiz | Esteban Evan Contreras | LP–PDP/Lakas/Nacionalista |
| Catanduanes | Rosalie Estacio | LDP |
| Cavite | Johnny Remulla | LDP |
| Cebu | Vicente dela Serna | LDP |
| Cotabato | Rosario Diaz | Lakas |
| Davao del Norte | Prospero Amatong | LDP |
| Davao del Sur | Rogelio Llanos | NPC |
| Davao Oriental | Rosalind Lopez | LDP |
| Eastern Samar | Lutgardo Barbo | Lakas/LP–PDP |
| Ifugao | Albert Pawingi | NPC |
| Ilocos Norte | Rodolfo Fariñas | Independent |
| Ilocos Sur | Chavit Singson | LDP |
| Iloilo | Arthur Defensor Sr. | Lakas |
| Isabela | Benjamin Dy | Lakas |
| Kalinga-Apayao | Lawrence Wacnang | LDP |
| La Union | Justo Orros Jr. | Lakas |
| Laguna | Felicisimo San Luis | LDP |
| Lanao del Norte | Abdullah Dimaporo | NPC/KBL/Nacionalista |
| Lanao del Sur | Mahid Mutilan | Lakas |
| Leyte | Leopoldo Petilla | LDP |
| Maguindanao | Norodin Matalam | LDP |
| Marinduque | Luisito Reyes | LDP |
| Masbate | Emilio Espinosa Jr. | NPC/INA |
| Misamis Occidental | Benito Chiongbian | Lakas |
| Misamis Oriental | Vicente Emano | LP–PDP |
| Mountain Province | Maximo Dalog | Lakas |
| Negros Occidental | Rafael Cosculluela | Lakas |
| Negros Oriental | Emilio Macias | NPC |
| Northern Samar | Harlin Abayon | LP–PDP |
| Nueva Ecija | Tomas Joson III | NPC/Balane |
| Nueva Vizcaya | Patricio Dumlao | Nacionalista/GAD/KBL/NPC |
| Occidental Mindoro | Josephine Ramirez | LDP |
| Oriental Mindoro | Rodolfo Valencia | LP–PDP |
| Palawan | Salvador Socrates | NPC |
| Pampanga | Bren Guiao | Lakas |
| Pangasinan | Aguedo Agbayani | Lakas |
| Quezon | Eduardo Rodriguez | LDP |
| Quirino | Pedro Bacani | LDP |
| Rizal | Casimiro Ynares Jr. | NPC |
| Romblon | Jose Madrid | Lakas |
| Samar | Antonio Bolastig | LP–PDP |
| Siquijor | Ben Aquino | LDP |
| Sorsogon | Juan Frivaldo | Lakas |
| South Cotabato | Hilario de Pedro III | LDP |
| Southern Leyte | Oscar Ma. Tan | LDP |
| Sultan Kudarat | Nesthur Gumana | Independent |
| Sulu | Tupay Loong | LDP |
| Surigao del Norte | Francisco Matugas | NPC |
| Surigao del Sur | Primo Murillo | Nacionalista |
| Tarlac | Tingting Cojuangco | LDP |
| Tawi-Tawi | Hadjaril Matba | LDP |
| Zambales | Amor Deloso | Lakas |
| Zamboanga del Norte | Isagani Amatong | Lakas |
| Zamboanga del Sur | Isidoro Real Jr. | Lakas |
Source: Commission on Elections

==== Vice gubernatorial elections ====
The following are the results of the vice gubernatorial elections by party:

| Party | Seats |
|---|---|
| Laban ng Demokratikong Pilipino | 26 |
| Nationalist People's Coalition | 17 |
| Lakas–NUCD | 13 |
| Koalisyong Pambansa | 6 |
| Nacionalista Party | 3 |
| Laban ng Demokratikong Pilipino/Lakas–NUCD/Nationalist People's Coalition | 1 |
| Nationalist People's Coalition/Bagong Lakas ng Nueva Ecija | 1 |
| Nationalist People's Coalition/Nacionalista Party | 1 |
| People's Reform Party | 1 |
| Independents | 3 |
| No party | 1 |
| Total | 73 |
Source: Commission on Elections

The following are the results of the vice gubernatorial elections by province:

| Province | Elected vice governor | Party |
|---|---|---|
| Abra | Constante Culangen | Lakas |
| Agusan del Norte | Roan Libarios | Lakas |
| Agusan del Sur | Alex Bascug | LDP |
| Aklan | Liberato Ibadlit | NPC |
| Albay | Danilo Azana | NPC |
| Antique | Robin Rubinos | Lakas |
| Aurora | Agapito Samano Jr. | Nacionalista |
| Basilan | Ping Kasim | LDP |
| Bataan | Efren Pascual Jr. | NPC |
| Batanes | Edmundo Puño | LP–PDP |
| Batangas | Guia Chavez | Nacionalista |
| Benguet | Walter Carantes | LDP |
| Bohol | Rene Relampagos | LDP |
| Bukidnon | Nemesio Beltran | NPC |
| Bulacan | Josefina dela Cruz | LDP |
| Cagayan | Oscar Pagulayan | LDP |
| Camarines Norte | Renato Verzo | Nacionalista |
| Camarines Sur | Crisanto Rances | NPC/Nacionalista |
| Camiguin | Francisco Calincin | LP–PDP |
| Capiz | Milagros Balgos | PRP |
| Catanduanes | Severo Alcantara | NPC |
| Cavite | Luis Ferrer III | LDP |
| Cebu | Apolonio Abines Jr. | LDP |
| Cotabato | Jose Tuburan Jr. | Lakas |
| Davao del Norte | Gelacio Gementiza | NPC |
| Davao del Sur | Antonio Sunga | Lakas |
| Davao Oriental | Cirilo Valles | LDP |
| Eastern Samar | Marcelino Libanan | Lakas |
| Ifugao | Herman Dinumla | NPC |
| Ilocos Norte | Mariano Nalupta Jr. | Independent |
| Ilocos Sur | Deogracias Victor Savellano | LDP |
| Iloilo | Robert Maroma | NPC |
| Isabela | Manuel Binag | LDP/Lakas/NPC |
| Kalinga-Apayao | Anthony Songgadan | LDP |
| La Union | Amparo Aspiras | NPC |
| Laguna | Restituto Luna | LDP |
| Lanao del Norte | Fred Tamula | LDP |
| Lanao del Sur | Omar Umpar | Lakas |
| Leyte | Aurelio Menzon | Lakas |
| Maguindanao | Ma'arouph Candao | LDP |
| Marinduque | Rosa Lecaroz | NPC |
| Masbate | Rainier Butalid | Independent |
| Misamis Occidental | Florencio Garcia | Lakas |
| Misamis Oriental | Miguel de Jesus | LP–PDP |
| Mountain Province | Leonard Mayaen | Independent |
| Negros Occidental | Romeo Gamboa Jr. | Lakas |
| Negros Oriental | George Arnaiz | NPC |
| Northern Samar | Sixto Balanquit Jr. | LP–PDP |
| Nueva Ecija | Oscar Tinio | NPC/Balane |
| Nueva Vizcaya | Rodolfo Agbayani | NPC |
| Occidental Mindoro | Crispin Perez Jr. | LDP |
| Oriental Mindoro | Pedrito Reyes | LDP |
| Palawan | Mario Joel Reyes | LDP |
| Pampanga | Lito Lapid | NPC |
| Pangasinan | Ranjit Shahani | Lakas |
| Quezon | Roberto Racelis | LDP |
| Quirino | Bonifacio Cristobal | LDP |
| Rizal | Nicandro Natividad | No party |
| Romblon | Peter Montojo | LDP |
| Samar | Terencio Uyloan | LP–PDP |
| Siquijor | Richard Quezon | LDP |
| Sorsogon | Antonio Escudero Jr. | NPC |
| South Cotabato | Miguel Escobar | LDP |
| Southern Leyte | Asisclo Munda | LDP |
| Sultan Kudarat | Sinsuat Andang | LP–PDP |
| Sulu | Hadji Munib Estino | LDP |
| Surigao del Norte | Alejandrino Echin | NPC |
| Surigao del Sur | Jesus Magno | NPC |
| Tarlac | Candido Guiam | LDP |
| Tawi-Tawi | Ismael Nurudin | LDP |
| Zambales | Saturnino Bactad | Lakas |
| Zamboanga del Norte | Eduardito Pacatang | Lakas |
| Zamboanga del Sur | Romeo Vera Cruz | NPC |
Source: Commission on Elections

==== Provincial board elections ====
The following are the results of the provincial board elections by party:

| Party | Seats |
|---|---|
| Laban ng Demokratikong Pilipino | 239 |
| Lakas–NUCD | 120 |
| Nationalist People's Coalition | 112 |
| Koalisyong Pambansa | 55 |
| Kilusang Bagong Lipunan | 12 |
| Nacionalista Party | 12 |
| Nacionalista Party/Nationalist People's Coalition | 8 |
| Lakas–NUCD/Laban ng Demokratikong Pilipino/Nationalist People's Coalition | 6 |
| Independent Nacionalistas and Allies/Nationalist People's Coalition | 4 |
| Nationalist People's Coalition/Pagtinabangay | 4 |
| Lakas–NUCD/Ompia Party | 3 |
| Laban ng Demokratikong Pilipino/Partido Magdalo | 3 |
| Kilusang Bagong Lipunan/Nationalist People's Coalition | 3 |
| Koalisyong Pambansa/Laban ng Demokratikong Pilipino | 3 |
| Koalisyong Pambansa/Nationalist People's Coalition | 3 |
| Nacionalista Party/Laban ng Demokratikong Pilipino | 3 |
| Nationalist People's Coalition/Bagong Lakas ng Nueva Ecija | 3 |
| Nationalist People's Coalition/Kilusang Bagong Lipunan | 3 |
| Kilusang Bagong Lipunan/Nacionalista Party/Nationalist People's Coalition | 2 |
| Lakas–NUCD/Koalisyong Pambansa | 2 |
| Nacionalista Party/Koalisyong Pambansa | 2 |
| Nationalist People's Coalition/Grand Alliance for Democracy/Kilusang Bagong Lipunan | 2 |
| Nationalist People's Coalition/Kilusang Bagong Lipunan/Nacionalista Party | 2 |
| Nationalist People's Coalition/Nacionalista Party | 2 |
| Partido ng Masang Pilipino | 2 |
| People's Reform Party | 2 |
| Islamic Party of the Philippines | 1 |
| Kilusang Bagong Lipunan/Lakas–NUCD | 1 |
| Kilusang Bagong Lipunan/Koalisyong Pambansa | 1 |
| Kilusang Bagong Lipunan/Nacionalista Party | 1 |
| Lakas–NUCD/Nationalist People's Coalition | 1 |
| Laban ng Demokratikong Pilipino/Independent | 1 |
| Koalisyong Pambansa/Lakas–NUCD | 1 |
| Koalisyong Pambansa/Lakas–NUCD/Nacionalista Party | 1 |
| Koalisyong Pambansa/Nacionalista Party | 1 |
| Koalisyong Pambansa/People's Reform Party | 1 |
| Nacionalista Party/Kilusang Bagong Lipunan | 1 |
| Nationalist People's Coalition/Laban ng Demokratikong Pilipino | 1 |
| Ompia Party | 1 |
| Independent/Laban ng Demokratikong Pilipino | 1 |
| Independents | 19 |
| No party | 5 |
| Total | 650 |
Source: Commission on Elections

The following are the results of the provincial board elections by province:

| Province | Elected seats | Party | Seats won |
|---|---|---|---|
| Abra | 8 | Lakas | 3 |
| Abra | 8 | NPC/GAD/KBL | 2 |
| Abra | 8 | KBL | 1 |
| Abra | 8 | KBL/Nacionalista/NPC | 1 |
| Abra | 8 | NPC | 1 |
| Agusan del Norte | 8 | Lakas | 4 |
| Agusan del Norte | 8 | NPC | 2 |
| Agusan del Norte | 8 | LDP/Independent | 1 |
| Agusan del Norte | 8 | Independent | 1 |
| Agusan del Sur | 8 | NPC/Pagtinabangay | 4 |
| Agusan del Sur | 8 | NPC | 3 |
| Agusan del Sur | 8 | LDP | 1 |
| Aklan | 8 | LDP | 3 |
| Aklan | 8 | Lakas | 2 |
| Aklan | 8 | NPC | 2 |
| Aklan | 8 | No party | 1 |
| Albay | 10 | NPC | 4 |
| Albay | 10 | Lakas | 2 |
| Albay | 10 | LDP | 2 |
| Albay | 10 | LP–PDP | 1 |
| Albay | 10 | Nacionalista | 1 |
| Antique | 8 | Lakas | 4 |
| Antique | 8 | LDP | 3 |
| Antique | 8 | PRP | 1 |
| Aurora | 6 | LDP | 4 |
| Aurora | 6 | LP–PDP | 1 |
| Aurora | 6 | NPC | 1 |
| Basilan | 6 | LP–PDP | 2 |
| Basilan | 6 | NPC | 2 |
| Basilan | 6 | Lakas | 1 |
| Basilan | 6 | PMP | 1 |
| Bataan | 10 | NPC | 4 |
| Bataan | 10 | LP–PDP/LDP | 3 |
| Bataan | 10 | LDP | 2 |
| Bataan | 10 | LP–PDP | 1 |
| Batanes | 6 | LP–PDP | 3 |
| Batanes | 6 | LDP | 2 |
| Batanes | 6 | Independent/LDP | 1 |
| Batangas | 10 | LDP | 4 |
| Batangas | 10 | Lakas | 3 |
| Batangas | 10 | Nacionalista | 2 |
| Batangas | 10 | No party | 1 |
| Benguet | 10 | LDP | 5 |
| Benguet | 10 | Lakas | 2 |
| Benguet | 10 | LP–PDP | 1 |
| Benguet | 10 | NPC | 1 |
| Benguet | 10 | Independent | 1 |
| Bohol | 10 | LDP | 8 |
| Bohol | 10 | Nacionalista/NPC | 1 |
| Bohol | 10 | NPC/Nacionalista | 1 |
| Bukidnon | 10 | NPC | 7 |
| Bukidnon | 10 | Lakas | 2 |
| Bukidnon | 10 | NPC/Nacionalista | 1 |
| Bulacan | 10 | LDP | 5 |
| Bulacan | 10 | NPC | 5 |
| Cagayan | 10 | Lakas | 5 |
| Cagayan | 10 | LP–PDP | 2 |
| Cagayan | 10 | NPC | 1 |
| Cagayan | 10 | Independent | 2 |
| Camarines Norte | 8 | LDP | 5 |
| Camarines Norte | 8 | NPC | 2 |
| Camarines Norte | 8 | Nacionalista/LP–PDP | 1 |
| Camarines Sur | 10 | LDP | 5 |
| Camarines Sur | 10 | Nacionalista/NPC | 4 |
| Camarines Sur | 10 | Nacionalista/LP–PDP | 1 |
| Camiguin | 6 | KBL | 1 |
| Camiguin | 6 | KBL/Lakas | 1 |
| Camiguin | 6 | Lakas | 1 |
| Camiguin | 6 | LP–PDP | 1 |
| Camiguin | 6 | Nacionalista/KBL | 1 |
| Camiguin | 6 | Independent | 1 |
| Capiz | 10 | NPC | 3 |
| Capiz | 10 | LP–PDP | 2 |
| Capiz | 10 | Lakas | 1 |
| Capiz | 10 | Lakas/LP–PDP | 1 |
| Capiz | 10 | LDP | 1 |
| Capiz | 10 | LP–PDP/Lakas/Nacionalista | 1 |
| Capiz | 10 | LP–PDP/Lakas | 1 |
| Catanduanes | 6 | LDP | 3 |
| Catanduanes | 6 | Lakas | 2 |
| Catanduanes | 6 | LP–PDP | 1 |
| Cavite | 10 | LDP | 6 |
| Cavite | 10 | LDP/Magdalo | 3 |
| Cavite | 10 | Lakas | 1 |
| Cebu | 10 | Lakas | 5 |
| Cebu | 10 | LDP | 3 |
| Cebu | 10 | NPC | 2 |
| Cotabato | 10 | LDP | 4 |
| Cotabato | 10 | Lakas | 3 |
| Cotabato | 10 | KBL | 2 |
| Cotabato | 10 | Independent | 1 |
| Davao del Norte | 10 | LDP | 9 |
| Davao del Norte | 10 | NPC | 1 |
| Davao del Sur | 10 | NPC | 6 |
| Davao del Sur | 10 | Lakas | 3 |
| Davao del Sur | 10 | Lakas/LP–PDP | 1 |
| Davao Oriental | 8 | LDP | 3 |
| Davao Oriental | 8 | NPC | 2 |
| Davao Oriental | 8 | Lakas | 1 |
| Davao Oriental | 8 | LP–PDP | 1 |
| Davao Oriental | 8 | No party | 1 |
| Eastern Samar | 8 | Lakas | 3 |
| Eastern Samar | 8 | NPC | 3 |
| Eastern Samar | 8 | LDP | 2 |
| Ifugao | 6 | Lakas | 2 |
| Ifugao | 6 | LP–PDP | 2 |
| Ifugao | 6 | KBL | 1 |
| Ifugao | 6 | LDP | 1 |
| Ilocos Norte | 10 | LDP | 5 |
| Ilocos Norte | 10 | NPC/KBL | 3 |
| Ilocos Norte | 10 | KBL | 2 |
| Ilocos Sur | 10 | LDP | 10 |
| Iloilo | 10 | LDP | 5 |
| Iloilo | 10 | Lakas | 4 |
| Iloilo | 10 | LP–PDP | 1 |
| Isabela | 10 | Lakas/LDP/NPC | 6 |
| Isabela | 10 | Lakas | 2 |
| Isabela | 10 | Lakas/NPC | 1 |
| Isabela | 10 | NPC/LDP | 1 |
| Kalinga-Apayao | 8 | LDP | 4 |
| Kalinga-Apayao | 8 | Lakas | 2 |
| Kalinga-Apayao | 8 | LP–PDP | 1 |
| Kalinga-Apayao | 8 | Independent | 1 |
| La Union | 10 | NPC | 9 |
| La Union | 10 | Lakas | 1 |
| Laguna | 10 | NPC | 5 |
| Laguna | 10 | LDP | 4 |
| Laguna | 10 | LP–PDP/NPC | 1 |
| Lanao del Norte | 8 | LDP | 4 |
| Lanao del Norte | 8 | NPC/KBL/Nacionalista | 2 |
| Lanao del Norte | 8 | Lakas | 2 |
| Lanao del Sur | 8 | Lakas/Ompia | 3 |
| Lanao del Sur | 8 | Lakas | 2 |
| Lanao del Sur | 8 | LDP | 1 |
| Lanao del Sur | 8 | NPC | 1 |
| Lanao del Sur | 8 | Ompia | 1 |
| Leyte | 10 | Lakas | 3 |
| Leyte | 10 | LDP | 3 |
| Leyte | 10 | KBL | 2 |
| Leyte | 10 | KBL/LP–PDP | 1 |
| Leyte | 10 | KBL/Nacionalista/NPC | 1 |
| Maguindanao | 10 | NPC | 3 |
| Maguindanao | 10 | LDP | 2 |
| Maguindanao | 10 | IPP | 1 |
| Maguindanao | 10 | KBL | 1 |
| Maguindanao | 10 | Lakas | 1 |
| Maguindanao | 10 | PMP | 1 |
| Maguindanao | 10 | Independent | 1 |
| Marinduque | 8 | LDP | 6 |
| Marinduque | 8 | Independent | 2 |
| Masbate | 10 | INA/NPC | 4 |
| Masbate | 10 | LDP | 3 |
| Masbate | 10 | LP–PDP | 2 |
| Masbate | 10 | Lakas | 1 |
| Misamis Occidental | 8 | Lakas | 4 |
| Misamis Occidental | 8 | Nacionalista/NPC | 2 |
| Misamis Occidental | 8 | NPC | 2 |
| Misamis Oriental | 10 | LP–PDP | 7 |
| Misamis Oriental | 10 | LDP | 3 |
| Mountain Province | 6 | Lakas | 3 |
| Mountain Province | 6 | Independent | 3 |
| Negros Occidental | 10 | Lakas | 4 |
| Negros Occidental | 10 | NPC | 3 |
| Negros Occidental | 10 | LP–PDP | 1 |
| Negros Occidental | 10 | KBL/NPC | 1 |
| Negros Occidental | 10 | Independent | 1 |
| Negros Oriental | 10 | LDP | 5 |
| Negros Oriental | 10 | Lakas | 3 |
| Negros Oriental | 10 | NPC | 2 |
| Northern Samar | 10 | LP–PDP | 8 |
| Northern Samar | 10 | KBL | 1 |
| Northern Samar | 10 | LDP | 1 |
| Nueva Ecija | 10 | LDP | 4 |
| Nueva Ecija | 10 | Lakas | 3 |
| Nueva Ecija | 10 | NPC/Balane | 3 |
| Nueva Vizcaya | 8 | LDP | 6 |
| Nueva Vizcaya | 8 | NPC | 1 |
| Nueva Vizcaya | 8 | No party | 1 |
| Occidental Mindoro | 8 | LDP | 7 |
| Occidental Mindoro | 8 | Lakas | 1 |
| Oriental Mindoro | 10 | LDP | 5 |
| Oriental Mindoro | 10 | LP–PDP | 4 |
| Oriental Mindoro | 10 | NPC | 1 |
| Palawan | 10 | LDP | 9 |
| Palawan | 10 | Independent | 1 |
| Pampanga | 10 | Lakas | 6 |
| Pampanga | 10 | LDP | 2 |
| Pampanga | 10 | LP–PDP | 1 |
| Pampanga | 10 | NPC | 1 |
| Pangasinan | 10 | LDP | 5 |
| Pangasinan | 10 | Lakas | 4 |
| Pangasinan | 10 | NPC | 1 |
| Quezon | 10 | LDP | 6 |
| Quezon | 10 | NPC | 2 |
| Quezon | 10 | LP–PDP | 1 |
| Quezon | 10 | Nacionalista/LDP | 1 |
| Quirino | 6 | LDP | 4 |
| Quirino | 6 | LP–PDP | 1 |
| Quirino | 6 | NPC | 1 |
| Rizal | 10 | LDP | 3 |
| Rizal | 10 | LP–PDP | 3 |
| Rizal | 10 | NPC | 2 |
| Rizal | 10 | LP–PDP/Nacionalista | 1 |
| Rizal | 10 | No party | 1 |
| Romblon | 6 | LDP | 5 |
| Romblon | 6 | Lakas | 1 |
| Samar | 10 | LP–PDP | 5 |
| Samar | 10 | Nacionalista | 5 |
| Siquijor | 6 | LDP | 2 |
| Siquijor | 6 | NPC | 2 |
| Siquijor | 6 | KBL | 1 |
| Siquijor | 6 | Lakas | 1 |
| Sorsogon | 10 | LDP | 4 |
| Sorsogon | 10 | NPC | 4 |
| Sorsogon | 10 | Lakas | 2 |
| South Cotabato | 10 | LDP | 6 |
| South Cotabato | 10 | LP–PDP/NPC | 2 |
| South Cotabato | 10 | LP–PDP | 1 |
| South Cotabato | 10 | Independent | 1 |
| Southern Leyte | 8 | LDP | 6 |
| Southern Leyte | 8 | KBL/NPC | 2 |
| Sultan Kudarat | 10 | LDP | 4 |
| Sultan Kudarat | 10 | Lakas | 1 |
| Sultan Kudarat | 10 | KBL/Nacionalista | 1 |
| Sultan Kudarat | 10 | LP–PDP | 1 |
| Sultan Kudarat | 10 | LP–PDP/PRP | 1 |
| Sultan Kudarat | 10 | Nacionalista | 1 |
| Sultan Kudarat | 10 | PRP | 1 |
| Sulu | 8 | LDP | 5 |
| Sulu | 8 | Lakas | 3 |
| Surigao del Norte | 8 | NPC | 4 |
| Surigao del Norte | 8 | LDP | 3 |
| Surigao del Norte | 8 | Lakas | 1 |
| Surigao del Sur | 10 | LDP | 5 |
| Surigao del Sur | 10 | Nacionalista | 3 |
| Surigao del Sur | 10 | Nacionalista/NPC | 1 |
| Surigao del Sur | 10 | NPC | 1 |
| Tarlac | 10 | NPC | 6 |
| Tarlac | 10 | LDP | 4 |
| Tawi-Tawi | 6 | LDP | 4 |
| Tawi-Tawi | 6 | Independent | 2 |
| Zambales | 10 | Lakas | 6 |
| Zambales | 10 | Nacionalista/LDP | 2 |
| Zambales | 10 | NPC | 1 |
| Zambales | 10 | Independent | 1 |
| Zamboanga del Norte | 10 | Lakas | 5 |
| Zamboanga del Norte | 10 | NPC | 4 |
| Zamboanga del Norte | 10 | LDP | 1 |
| Zamboanga del Sur | 10 | Lakas | 4 |
| Zamboanga del Sur | 10 | NPC | 4 |
| Zamboanga del Sur | 10 | LDP | 2 |
Source: Commission on Elections

==== Local plebiscites ====
Plebiscites to ratify the provincehood of Biliran and Guimaras were also done on this day. Both proposals were carried.

== See also ==
- Commission on Elections
- Politics of the Philippines
- Philippine elections
- President of the Philippines
- 9th Congress of the Philippines
