= 1992 Philippine Senate election =

24th election of members to the Senate of the Philippines

- May 11, 1992

All 24 seats in the Senate 13 seats needed for a majority
	Majority party	Minority party
Party	LDP	NPC
Seats won	16	5
Popular vote	124,076,351	49,881,921
Percentage	44.95	18.07
	Third party	Fourth party
Party	Lakas	LP–PDP
Seats won	2	1
Popular vote	48,789,154	19,104,398
Percentage	17.67	6.92
- Results showing the alliance affiliation of first-placed candidates by region
Senate President before election
Neptali Gonzales
LDP
Elected Senate President
Neptali Gonzales
LDP

The 24th election of members to the Senate of the Philippines was held on Monday, May 11, 1992. This was the first general election (where all positions were contested) under the 1987 Philippine Constitution. An estimated 80,000 candidates ran for 17,000 posts, from the presidency all the way down to municipal councilors.

The Laban ng Demokratikong Pilipino (LDP) got a large share in the Senate race. TV personality and former Quezon City Vice Mayor Tito Sotto got the highest number of votes.

== Electoral system ==
Philippine Senate elections are via pluraity block voting, with staggered elections, with the entire country as an at-large "district". Each voter has 24 votes, and can vote for up to 24 candidates.

Under the transitory provisions of the Philippine constitution, all 24 senators were elected in this election. The first 12 senators who garnered the highest votes would have a six-year term while the next 12 senators would also have a three-year term. For purposes of term limits, each term counts as 1 term regardless of length.

== Political parties in 1992 ==
As this was as held concurrently with the 1992 presidential election, presidential candidates also presented senatorial slates. Six of seven slates had 24 candidates, while one has 16.

- LDP: Laban ng Demokratikong Pilipino
- Lakas–NUCD: Lakas Tao–National Union of Christian Democrats
- NPC: Nationalist People's Coalition
- LP–PDP–Laban: Liberal Party–Partido ng Demokratikong Pilipino–Lakas ng Bayan (Koalisyong Pambansa)
- NP: Nacionalista Party
- KBL: Kilusang Bagong Lipunan
- PRP: People's Reform Party

== Candidates ==
As the Senate elections were held with the presidential election, all 7 presidential candidates put up senatorial tickets. These were as follows:

Party	Presidential candidate	Vice presidential candidate	Number of candidates
Kilusang Bagong Lipunan	Imelda Marcos	Vicente Magsaysay	24
Laban ng Demokratikong Pilipino	Ramon Mitra Jr.	Marcelo Fernan	24
Lakas–NUCD	Fidel V. Ramos	Lito Osmeña	24
Liberal Party–PDP–Laban (Koalisyong Pambansa)	Jovito Salonga	Nene Pimentel	23
Nationalist People's Coalition	Danding Cojuangco	Joseph Estrada	24
People's Reform Party	Miriam Defensor Santiago	Ramon Magsaysay Jr.	16
Nacionalista Party	Salvador Laurel	Eva Estrada Kalaw	24

These were the following tickets:

Kilusang Bagong Lipunan (Marcos-Magsaysay) ticket
Name	Name
Simeon Alejandro	Rod Navarro
James Barbers	Benjamin Nuega
Rommel Corro	Arturo Padua
Alfredo de Gracia	Salvador Panelo
Jaime Echeverria	Augusto Pangan, Sr.
Louie Garchitorena	Leonora Petines
Alfredo Lamen	Vicente Piccio
Pacifico Lopez de Leon	Josephus Ramas
Oliver Lozano	Rafael Recto
Abdul Sarip Macmod	Jose Tumbokon
Jesus Martinez	Elpidio Valera
Madrino Muñoz	Johnny Wilson

Koalisyong Pambansa (Salonga-Pimentel) ticket
Name	Name
Florencio Abad	Oscar Morado
Macapanton Abbas	Ceferino Padua, Jr. (withdraw)
Miguel Acebedo	Nemesio Prudente
Gerardo del Mundo	Wilfredo Rafols
Florangel Rosario-Braid	Ruperto Martin
Jesus Antonio M. Carpio Sr	Reynaldo San Juan
Raul Contreras	Ponciano Subido
Elfren Cruz	Ramon Tagle, Jr.
Camilo Diel	Wigberto Tañada
Genaro Mabasa	Lorna Verano Yap
Ramon Garcia	Victor Ziga
Alfredo Zerrudo	Melchor Chavez (disqualified)

Laban ng Demokratikong Pilipino (Mitra-Fernan) ticket
Name	Name
Heherson Alvarez	Leonor Luciano
Wencelito Andanar	Orlando S. Mercado
Edgardo Angara	Narciso Monfort
Butz Aquino	Blas Ople
Gloria Macapagal Arroyo	Carlos M. Padilla
Rodolfo Biazon	Ramon Revilla, Sr.
Jose S. Concepcion, Jr.	Raul Roco
Neptali Gonzales	Alberto Romulo
Teofisto Guingona, Jr.	Tito Sotto
Rodrigo Gutang	Mamintal Tamano
Ernesto Herrera	Ramon Villarama
Jose Lina, Jr.	Freddie Webb

Lakas–NUCD (Ramos-Osmeña) ticket
Name	Name
Sanchez Ali	Conrado Manicad
Adolfo Azcuna	Manuel Morato
Silvestre Bello III	Aurelio Periquet
Alfredo Bengzon	Eduardo Pilapil
Israel Bocobo	Leonardo Quisumbing
Guillermo Carague	Santanina Rasul
Francisco Chavez	Jose Villegas
Jaime Cura	Jose V. Romero Jr.
Marietta P. Goco	Leticia Ramos-Shahani
Tomas Gomez III	Francisco Sumulong
Ramon Jacinto	Ruben Torres
Jose Lopez	Arsenio Yulo

Nacionalista Party (Laurel-Kalaw) ticket
Name	Name
Edgardo Abenina	Sotero Laurel
Homobono Adaza	Horacio Marasigan
Marcelino Arias	Ramon Maronilla
Roger Arienda	Steve Osmeña
Edgar Ilarde	Roger Panotes
Ramon Orosa	Datu Ray Ibrahim Uy
Vincent Crisologo	Hjalmar Quintana
Nora Daza	Norberto Romualdez III
Wilson Gamboa	Dorotheo Salazar
Crisostomo Vitug	Mariano Santiago
Amado Gat Inciong	Bonifacio Tupaz
Antonio Fa. Muyot	Gonzalo Villa

Nationalist People's Coalition (Cojuangco-Estrada) ticket
Name	Name
Blo Umpar Adiong	Mario Leviste
Alexander Aguirre	Felix Brawner Jr.
Ruben Ancheta	Ernesto Maceda
Manuel Barcelona Jr.	Estelito Mendoza
Jerry Barican	Vicente Rivera Jr.
Julio Cesar Climaco	John Henry Osmeña
Nikki Coseteng	Jose Tamayo
Gerry Espina	Jesus Paredes
Alex Fider	Elsa Payumo
Gerry Geronimo	Rufus Rodriguez
Vivian Hultman	Francisco Tatad
Katrina Legarda-Santos	Arturo Tolentino

People's Reform Party (Santiago-Magsaysay) ticket
Name	Name
Fortunato Abat	Antonio Leviste
Cris Abasolo	Abdullah Abe Madale
Carlos Cajelo	Jaime Muyargas
Dominico Casas	Antonio Policarpio
Jose Cordova	Mariano Reyes
Dante de Guzman	Jonathan Rivera
Renato Ecarma	Efren Sumajit
Melchor Ines	Albert D. Umali

Partido ng Masang Pilipino ticket
Name
Conrado Leonardo
Jovencio Kintanar
Rolando Quintos

Independents
Name
Juanito Arribas
Miguel Lopez Jr.

== Retiring incumbents ==
1. Joseph Estrada (NPC), ran for Vice President of the Philippines and won
2. Vicente Paterno (PDP–Laban), retired from politics
3. Aquilino Pimentel Jr. (PDP–Laban), ran for Vice President of the Philippines and lost, ran for senator in 1995 and lost, ran again in 1998 and won
4. Juan Ponce Enrile (Nacionalista), ran for representative from Cagayan's 1st district and won; ran for senator in 1995 and won
5. Rene Saguisag (Liberal), originally promised to run for just one term; retired from politics
6. Jovito Salonga (Liberal), ran for President of the Philippines and lost

=== Mid-term vacancies ===
1. Raul Manglapus, appointed as Secretary of Foreign Affairs

== Results ==
The Laban ng Demokratikong Pilipino (LDP) winning 16 seats, the Nationalist People's Coalition (NPC) winning five, the Lakas-NUCD winning two, and the Liberal Party winning one.

These were the incumbents who won: Lakas's Leticia Ramos-Shahani and Nina Rasul, LDP's Heherson Alvarez, Edgardo Angara, Butz Aquino, Neptali Gonzales, Teofisto Guingona Jr., Ernesto Herrera, Joey Lina, Orlando S. Mercado, and Alberto Romulo, Liberal's Wigberto Tañada, and NPC's John Henry Osmeña and Ernesto Maceda,

Neophyte senators were LDP's Gloria Macapagal Arroyo, Rodolfo Biazon, Blas Ople, Ramon Revilla Sr., Raul Roco, Tito Sotto and Freddie Webb, and NPC's Nikki Coseteng.

Returning was Arturo Tolentino, who last served in the Senate in 1971.

Incumbents who were defeated were LDP's Mamintal A.J. Tamano, Liberal's Victor Ziga, and Nacionalista's Sotero Laurel.

For purposes of counting of terms the three-year terms of those that finished 13th to 24th in this election count as one term, just as those who have six-year terms

	1	2	3	4	5	6	7	8	9	10	11	12	13	14	15	16	17	18	19	20	21	22	23	24
Before election	‡	‡	‡	‡	‡	‡	‡	‡	‡	‡	‡	‡	‡	‡	‡	‡	‡	‡	‡	‡	‡	‡	‡	‡^
Election result	LDP																Lakas		LP	NPC				
After election	+	+	+	+	+	√	√	√	√	√	√	√	√	√	*	+	√	√	√	+	√	√	*	+
Senate bloc	Majority bloc																							Min bloc

Key:

- ‡ Seats up
- + Gained by a party from another party
- √ Held by the incumbent
- * Held by the same party with a new senator
- ^ Vacancy

=== Per candidate ===
The first 12 elected candidates were to serve from June 30, 1992, until June 30, 1998, while the following 12 elected candidates were to serve from June 30, 1992, until June 30, 1995.

Candidate	Party	Votes	%
Tito Sotto	Laban ng Demokratikong Pilipino	11,792,121	48.62
Ramon Revilla Sr.	Laban ng Demokratikong Pilipino	8,321,278	34.31
Edgardo Angara	Laban ng Demokratikong Pilipino	8,019,011	33.06
Ernesto Herrera	Laban ng Demokratikong Pilipino	7,219,170	29.76
Alberto Romulo	Laban ng Demokratikong Pilipino	6,824,256	28.14
Ernesto Maceda	Nationalist People's Coalition	6,820,717	28.12
Orly Mercado	Laban ng Demokratikong Pilipino	6,691,132	27.59
Neptali Gonzales	Laban ng Demokratikong Pilipino	6,578,582	27.12
Leticia Ramos-Shahani	Lakas–NUCD	6,367,468	26.25
Heherson Alvarez	Laban ng Demokratikong Pilipino	6,360,898	26.23
Blas Ople	Laban ng Demokratikong Pilipino	6,024,930	24.84
Freddie Webb	Laban ng Demokratikong Pilipino	5,929,426	24.45
Gloria Macapagal Arroyo	Laban ng Demokratikong Pilipino	5,858,950	24.16
Teofisto Guingona Jr.	Laban ng Demokratikong Pilipino	5,830,044	24.04
Santanina Rasul	Lakas–NUCD	5,546,803	22.87
Joey Lina	Laban ng Demokratikong Pilipino	5,064,291	20.88
Nikki Coseteng	Nationalist People's Coalition	5,008,981	20.65
Arturo Tolentino	Nationalist People's Coalition	4,929,625	20.32
Raul Roco	Laban ng Demokratikong Pilipino	4,884,455	20.14
Rodolfo Biazon	Laban ng Demokratikong Pilipino	4,863,752	20.05
Wigberto Tañada	Koalisyong Pambansa	4,492,718	18.52
Francisco Tatad	Nationalist People's Coalition	4,487,896	18.50
John Henry Osmeña	Nationalist People's Coalition	4,408,145	18.17
Butz Aquino	Laban ng Demokratikong Pilipino	4,283,388	17.66
Alfredo Bengzon	Lakas–NUCD	3,964,000	16.34
Carlos Padilla	Laban ng Demokratikong Pilipino	3,828,679	15.79
Alexander Aguirre	Nationalist People's Coalition	3,755,837	15.48
Mamintal A.J. Tamano	Laban ng Demokratikong Pilipino	3,642,828	15.02
Jose Concepcion Jr.	Laban ng Demokratikong Pilipino	3,598,935	14.84
Silvestre Bello III	Lakas–NUCD	3,559,202	14.67
Francisco Sumulong	Lakas–NUCD	3,167,838	13.06
Estelito Mendoza	Nationalist People's Coalition	3,122,467	12.87
Victor Ziga	Koalisyong Pambansa	3,151,251	12.99
Sotero Laurel	Nacionalista Party	3,002,874	12.38
Francisco Chavez	Lakas–NUCD	2,948,912	12.16
Ruben Torres	Lakas–NUCD	2,737,112	11.28
Rafael Recto	Kilusang Bagong Lipunan	2,726,189	11.24
Florencio Abad	Koalisyong Pambansa	2,494,643	10.29
Narciso Monfort	Laban ng Demokratikong Pilipino	2,483,459	10.24
Augusto Pangan	Kilusang Bagong Lipunan	2,408,185	9.93
Eduardo Pilapil	Lakas–NUCD	2,065,900	8.52
RJ Jacinto	Lakas–NUCD	1,873,910	7.73
Eddie Ilarde	Nacionalista Party	1,800,077	7.42
Arsenio Yulo Jr.	Lakas–NUCD	1,774,931	7.32
Gerardo Espina Sr.	Nationalist People's Coalition	1,755,120	7.24
Nemesio Prudente	Koalisyong Pambansa	1,747,569	7.20
Guillermo Carague	Lakas–NUCD	1,743,896	7.19
Wencelito Andanar	Laban ng Demokratikong Pilipino	1,711,611	7.06
Buddy Gomez	Lakas–NUCD	1,696,311	6.99
Adolfo Azcuna	Lakas–NUCD	1,640,220	6.76
Jose Tamayo	Nationalist People's Coalition	1,634,268	6.74
Ramon Villarama Jr.	Laban ng Demokratikong Pilipino	1,629,846	6.72
Homobono Adaza	Nacionalista Party	1,551,366	6.40
Vincent Crisologo	Nacionalista Party	1,551,068	6.39
Manuel Morato	Lakas–NUCD	1,516,715	6.25
Rodrigo Gutang	Laban ng Demokratikong Pilipino	1,508,552	6.22
Ruben Ancheta	Nationalist People's Coalition	1,506,700	6.21
Vivian Hultman	Nationalist People's Coalition	1,459,535	6.02
Leonor Luciano	Laban ng Demokratikong Pilipino	1,445,179	5.96
Aurelio Periquet	Lakas–NUCD	1,243,438	5.13
Vicente Rivera Jr.	Nationalist People's Coalition	1,177,056	4.85
Ramon Orosa	Nacionalista Party	1,164,990	4.80
Gerry Geronimo	Nationalist People's Coalition	1,154,934	4.76
Sanchez Ali	Lakas–NUCD	1,073,750	4.43
Lorna Verano-Yap	Koalisyong Pambansa	1,050,304	4.33
Felix Brawner Jr.	Nationalist People's Coalition	1,036,963	4.28
Zosimo Paredes	Nationalist People's Coalition	1,029,813	4.25
Leonardo Quisumbing	Lakas–NUCD	1,021,627	4.21
Rod Navarro	Kilusang Bagong Lipunan	966,823	3.99
Elsa Payumo	Nationalist People's Coalition	936,926	3.86
Fortunato Abat	People's Reform Party	928,417	3.83
Antonio Leviste	People's Reform Party	919,229	3.79
Katrina Legarda	Nationalist People's Coalition	914,763	3.77
Julio Cesar Climaco	Nationalist People's Coalition	882,680	3.64
Rufus Rodriguez	Nationalist People's Coalition	812,144	3.35
Macapanton Abbas	Koalisyong Pambansa	806,434	3.32
Wilson Gamboa Sr.	Nacionalista Party	803,995	3.31
Blo Umpar Adiong	Nationalist People's Coalition	762,688	3.14
Johnny Wilson	Kilusang Bagong Lipunan	753,627	3.11
Jose Malvar Romero Jr.	Lakas–NUCD	739,919	3.05
Marietta Corazon Primicias-Goco	Lakas–NUCD	737,676	3.04
Reynaldo San Juan	Koalisyong Pambansa	729,610	3.01
Ramon Garcia	Koalisyong Pambansa	717,341	2.96
Israel Bocobo	Lakas–NUCD	707,568	2.92
Rogelio Arienda	Nacionalista Party	704,450	2.90
Jose Villegas Jr.	Lakas–NUCD	688,718	2.84
Jesus Antonio Carpio	Koalisyong Pambansa	668,746	2.76
James Barbers	Kilusang Bagong Lipunan	664,019	2.74
Manuel Barcelona Jr.	Nationalist People's Coalition	618,539	2.55
Jaime Cura	Lakas–NUCD	612,363	2.52
Conrado Manicad	Lakas–NUCD	606,577	2.50
Fernando Barrican	Nationalist People's Coalition	602,169	2.48
Mario Leviste	Nationalist People's Coalition	556,375	2.29
Jose Lopez	Lakas–NUCD	543,186	2.24
Alejandro Fider	Nationalist People's Coalition	507,580	2.09
Jonathan Rivera	People's Reform Party	502,858	2.07
Miguel Acebedo	Koalisyong Pambansa	477,778	1.97
Elfren Cruz	Koalisyong Pambansa	461,371	1.90
Esteban Osmeña	Nacionalista Party	447,196	1.84
Vicente Piccio Jr.	Kilusang Bagong Lipunan	439,995	1.81
Marcelino Arias	Nacionalista Party	428,716	1.77
Mariano Reyes	People's Reform Party	414,577	1.71
Doroteo Salazar	Nacionalista Party	414,061	1.71
Arturo Padua	Kilusang Bagong Lipunan	413,123	1.70
Cristin Abasolo Jr.	People's Reform Party	409,905	1.69
Oliver Lozano	Kilusang Bagong Lipunan	407,538	1.68
Abdullah Madale	People's Reform Party	391,723	1.62
Jose Cordova	People's Reform Party	379,383	1.56
Nora Daza	Nacionalista Party	379,157	1.56
Josephus Ramas	Kilusang Bagong Lipunan	378,451	1.56
Dante de Guzman	People's Reform Party	376,327	1.55
Mariano Santiago	Nacionalista Party	373,161	1.54
Carlos Cajelo	People's Reform Party	370,901	1.53
Alfredo Lamen	Kilusang Bagong Lipunan	349,796	1.44
Camilo Diel Jr.	Koalisyong Pambansa	345,728	1.43
Edgardo Abenina	Nacionalista Party	342,908	1.41
Melchor Ines	People's Reform Party	337,449	1.39
Ramon Tagle	Koalisyong Pambansa	326,153	1.34
Albert Umali	People's Reform Party	319,842	1.32
Florangel Rosario-Braid	Koalisyong Pambansa	310,953	1.28
Simeon Alejandro	Kilusang Bagong Lipunan	308,618	1.27
Rommel Corro	Kilusang Bagong Lipunan	307,832	1.27
Antonio Policarpio	People's Reform Party	299,538	1.23
Renato Ecarma	People's Reform Party	291,236	1.20
Salvador Panelo	Kilusang Bagong Lipunan	289,416	1.19
Jaime Echevarria	Kilusang Bagong Lipunan	287,342	1.18
Pacifico Lopez de Leon	Kilusang Bagong Lipunan	283,236	1.17
Ponciano Subido	Koalisyong Pambansa	270,608	1.12
Jaime Muyargas	People's Reform Party	258,711	1.07
Jesus Martinez	Kilusang Bagong Lipunan	257,276	1.06
Abdul Sarip Macmod	Kilusang Bagong Lipunan	250,548	1.03
Roger Panotes	Nacionalista Party	242,543	1.00
Raul Contreras	Koalisyong Pambansa	224,004	0.92
Efren Sumajit	People's Reform Party	215,563	0.89
Oscar Morado	Koalisyong Pambansa	203,859	0.84
Leonora Petines	Kilusang Bagong Lipunan	199,718	0.82
Miguel Lopez Jr.	Independent	199,593	0.82
Madrino Muñoz	Kilusang Bagong Lipunan	199,359	0.82
Gerardo del Mundo	Koalisyong Pambansa	197,249	0.81
Crisostomo Vitug	Nacionalista Party	193,222	0.80
Wilfredo Rafols	Koalisyong Pambansa	186,004	0.77
Elpidio Valera	Kilusang Bagong Lipunan	185,845	0.77
Amado Gat Inciong	Nacionalista Party	183,446	0.76
Hjalmar Quintana	Nacionalista Party	165,212	0.68
Luis Garchitorena	Kilusang Bagong Lipunan	158,500	0.65
Jovencio Kintanar	Partido ng Masang Pilipino	158,200	0.65
Ramon Maronilla	Nacionalista Party	156,138	0.64
Bonifacio Tupaz	Nacionalista Party	154,939	0.64
Jose Tumbokon	Kilusang Bagong Lipunan	151,748	0.63
Benjamin Nuega	Kilusang Bagong Lipunan	144,064	0.59
Norberto Romualdez III	Nacionalista Party	141,741	0.58
Genaro Mabasa	Koalisyong Pambansa	133,677	0.55
Alfredo de Gracia	Kilusang Bagong Lipunan	116,981	0.48
Gonzalo Villa	Nacionalista Party	111,753	0.46
Juanito Arribas	Independent	105,671	0.44
Horacio Marasigan	Nacionalista Party	105,172	0.43
Alfredo Zerrudo	Koalisyong Pambansa	96,614	0.40
Dominico Casas	People's Reform Party	90,804	0.37
Antonio Fa. Muyot	Nacionalista Party	61,339	0.25
Conrado Leonardo	Partido ng Masang Pilipino	48,337	0.20
Rolando Quintos	Partido ng Masang Pilipino	38,581	0.16
Ruperto Martin	Koalisyong Pambansa	11,784	0.05
Datu Ray Ibrahim Uy	Nacionalista Party	6,278	0.03
Melchor Chavez (Note: Disqualified but remained on the ballot)	Koalisyong Pambansa	0	0.00
Ceferino Padua (Note: Withdrew but remained on the ballot)	Koalisyong Pambansa	0	0.00
Total		276,150,008	100.00
Total votes		24,254,954	–
Registered voters/turnout		32,141,079	75.46

=== Per party ===
Party	Votes	%	+/–	Seats	+/–
Laban ng Demokratikong Pilipino	124,076,351	44.95	New	16	New
Nationalist People's Coalition	49,881,921	18.07	New	5	New
Lakas–NUCD	48,789,154	17.67	New	2	New
Koalisyong Pambansa (Note: Electoral alliance of Liberal Party and PDP–Laban)	19,104,398	6.92	New	1	New
Nacionalista Party	14,485,802	5.25	New	0	New
Kilusang Bagong Lipunan	12,648,229	4.58	+0.23	0	0
People's Reform Party	6,506,463	2.36	New	0	0
Partido ng Masang Pilipino	245,118	0.09	New	0	0
Independent	305,264	0.11	−1.64	0	0
Vacancy				0	−1
Total	276,042,700	100.00	–	24	–
Total votes	24,254,954	–			
Registered voters/turnout	32,141,079	75.46			

Vote share
LDP	44.95%
NPC	18.07%
Lakas	17.67%
LP-PDP	6.92%
Others	12.39%

Senate seats won
LDP	66.67%
NPC	20.83%
Lakas	8.33%
LP-PDP	4.17%
Others	0%

== Defeated incumbents ==
1. Sotero Laurel (Nacionalista), retired from politics
2. Mamintal A. J. Tamano (LDP), retired from politics
3. Victor Ziga (Liberal), retired from politics

== See also ==
- Commission on Elections
- Politics of the Philippines
- Philippine elections
- President of the Philippines
- 9th Congress of the Philippines
