= List of senators of the Philippines in the 9th Congress by seniority =

This is a complete list of senators of the Philippines during the 9th Congress of the Philippines listed by seniority from June 30, 1992, to June 30, 1995.

The criteria for seniority used in this article are derived from the cumulative length of service of a member of the Senate prior to the current Congress. Although an official roster ranking senators by seniority is not publicly available, their total cumulative years of service have been used to determine seniority. It has long been customary, following the practice of the United States Senate, to elect the most senior senator as either president of the Senate or president pro tempore, although this practice has become less common in the modern Senate. Furthermore, seniority is traditionally considered in the selection of chairpersons of major Senate committees.

In cases where senators have equal cumulative service, seniority is determined by the following criteria, in order:

- Longest uninterrupted period of service
- Earlier date on which the cumulative length of service was achieved
- Alphabetical order of surnames

In this Congress, Arturo Tolentino was the most senior senator, having previously served 14 years in the pre-martial law Senate, while Freddie Webb was the most junior senator.

== List of senators by seniority ==
Rank	Senator	Party		Length of previous tenures (Dates of previous tenures)	Notes
Rank	Senator	Start of Congress	End of Congress	Length of previous tenures (Dates of previous tenures)	Notes
1	Arturo Tolentino	NPC		14 years, 268 days (December 30, 1965 – September 23, 1972)	
2	Ernesto Maceda	NPC		5 years, 268 days (December 30, 1971 – September 23, 1972; June 30, 1987 – June 30, 1992)	Senate president pro tempore (until January 18, 1993)
3	John Henry Osmeña	NPC	LDP	5 years, 268 days (December 30, 1971 – September 23, 1972; June 30, 1987 – June 30, 1992)	
4	Heherson Alvarez	LDP		5 years, 0 days (June 30, 1987 – June 30, 1992)	
5	Edgardo Angara	LDP		5 years, 0 days (June 30, 1987 – June 30, 1992)	Senate president (from January 18, 1993)
6	Butz Aquino	LDP		5 years, 0 days (June 30, 1987 – June 30, 1992)	
7	Neptali Gonzales	LDP		5 years, 0 days (June 30, 1987 – June 30, 1992)	Senate president (until January 18, 1993)
8	Teofisto Guingona Jr.	LDP		5 years, 0 days (June 30, 1987 – June 30, 1992)	Senate president pro tempore (from January 18, 1993); Resigned on July 6, 1993, upon being appointed as Executive Secretary.
9	Ernesto Herrera	LDP		5 years, 0 days (June 30, 1987 – June 30, 1992)	
10	Joey Lina	LDP		5 years, 0 days (June 30, 1987 – June 30, 1992)	
11	Orly Mercado	LDP		5 years, 0 days (June 30, 1987 – June 30, 1992)	
12	Leticia Ramos-Shahani	Lakas		5 years, 0 days (June 30, 1987 – June 30, 1992)	Senate president pro tempore (from July 26, 1993)
13	Alberto Romulo	LDP		5 years, 0 days (June 30, 1987 – June 30, 1992)	
14	Wigberto Tañada	Liberal (Note: Wigberto Tañada was affiliated with the Koalisyong Pambansa in 1992.)		5 years, 0 days (June 30, 1987 – June 30, 1992)	
15	Nina Rasul	Lakas		4 years, 340 days (July 26, 1987 – June 30, 1992)	
16	Rodolfo Biazon	LDP			
17	Nikki Coseteng	NPC			
18	Gloria Macapagal Arroyo	LDP			
19	Blas Ople	LDP			
20	Ramon Revilla Sr.	LDP			
21	Raul Roco	LDP			
22	Tito Sotto	LDP			
23	Francisco Tatad	NPC	LDP		
24	Freddie Webb	LDP			
