= List of senators of the Philippines in the 8th Congress by seniority =

This is a complete list of senators of the Philippines during the 8th Congress of the Philippines listed by seniority from June 30, 1987, to June 30, 1992.

The criteria for seniority used in this article are derived from the cumulative length of service of a member of the Senate prior to the current Congress. Although an official roster ranking senators by seniority is not publicly available, their total cumulative years of service have been used to determine seniority. It has long been customary, following the practice of the United States Senate, to elect the most senior senator as either president of the Senate or president pro tempore, although this practice has become less common in the modern Senate. Furthermore, seniority is traditionally considered in the selection of chairpersons of major Senate committees.

In cases where senators have equal cumulative service, seniority is determined by the following criteria, in order:

- Longest uninterrupted period of service
- Earlier date on which the cumulative length of service was achieved
- Alphabetical order of surnames

In this Congress, Jovito Salonga was the most senior senator, having previously served six years in the pre-martial law Senate, while Victor Ziga was the most junior senator.

== List of senators by seniority ==
Rank	Senator	Party		Length of previous tenures (Dates of previous tenures)	Notes
Rank	Senator	Start of Congress	End of Congress	Length of previous tenures (Dates of previous tenures)	Notes
1	Jovito Salonga	Liberal		6 years, 268 days (December 30, 1965 – September 23, 1972)	Senate president (until January 18, 1992)
2	Raul Manglapus	NUCD		6 years, 0 days (December 30, 1961 – December 30, 1967)	Resigned on October 9, 1987, upon being appointed as Secretary of Foreign Affairs.
3	Mamintal A. J. Tamano	Nacionalista	LDP	2 years, 268 days (December 30, 1969 – September 23, 1972)	Took office on July 6, 1987.
4	Ernesto Maceda	PDP–Laban	NPC	268 days (December 30, 1971 – September 23, 1972)	Senate president pro tempore (from January 18, 1992)
5	John Henry Osmeña	Liberal	NPC	268 days (December 30, 1971 – September 23, 1972)	
6	Heherson Alvarez	LnB	LDP		
7	Edgardo Angara	Independent	LDP		
8	Butz Aquino	BANDILA	LDP		
9	Joseph Estrada	Liberal	NPC		
10	Neptali Gonzales	UNIDO	LDP		Senate president (from January 18, 1992)
11	Teofisto Guingona Jr.	Liberal	LDP		Senate president pro tempore (until July 23, 1990)
12	Ernesto Herrera	Liberal	LDP		
13	Sotero Laurel	UNIDO	Nacionalista		Senate president pro tempore (July 23, 1990 – January 18, 1992)
14	Joey Lina	UNIDO	LDP		
15	Orly Mercado	Liberal	LDP		
16	Vicente Paterno	PDP–Laban			
17	Nene Pimentel	PDP–Laban			
18	Juan Ponce Enrile	Nacionalista			Took office on August 15, 1987.
19	Leticia Ramos-Shahani	UNIDO	Lakas		
20	Nina Rasul	Liberal	Lakas		Took office on July 26, 1987.
21	Alberto Romulo	UNIDO	LDP		
22	Rene Saguisag	Liberal			
23	Wigberto Tañada	Liberal			
24	Victor Ziga	UNIDO	Liberal		
