= Tomás Gómez =

Tomás Gómez may refer to:

- Tomás Gómez (Spanish politician) (born 1968)
- Tomas Gomez (Filipino politician) (1877–1926), Filipino physician and politician
- Tomas Gomez (soccer) (born 1993), American soccer player
- Buddy Gomez (Tomas Bayhon Gomez III, 1935–2021), Philippine journalist, businessman, and politician
