= Tañada (surname) =

Tañada is a surname. Notable people with the surname include:

- Erin Tañada (born 1963), Filipino nationalist lawyer, broadcaster, congressman, and human rights and labor rights advocate
- Lorenzo Tañada (1898–1992), Filipino nationalist lawyer, senator, and human and civil rights activist, Solicitor General, Judge, and known as the "Grand Old Man of Philippine Politics"
- Wigberto Tañada (born 1934), Filipino nationalist lawyer, politician, Senator, Congressman, Commissioner, and human rights and labor rights advocate
