= Jesus C. Azurin =

Filipino doctor and Minister of Health

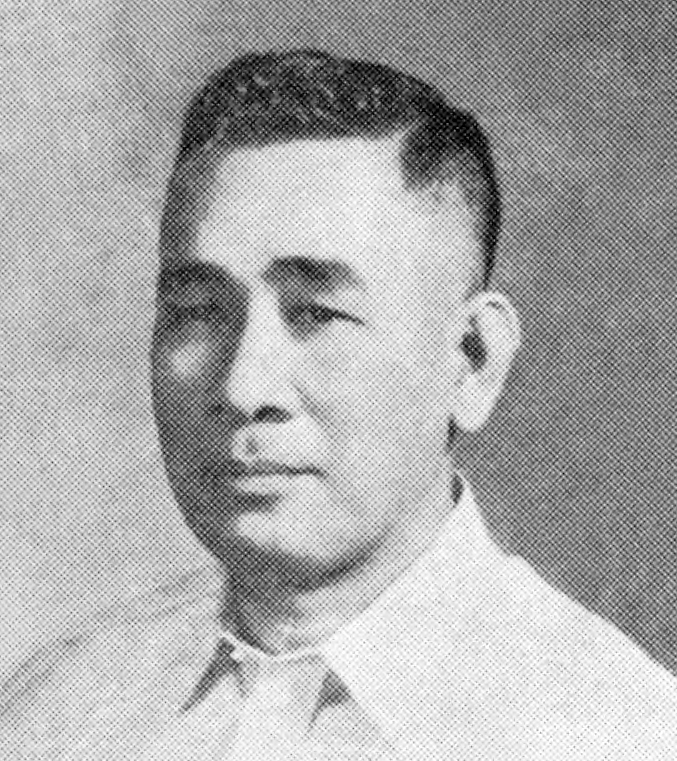

Minister of Health
- In office July 25, 1981 – February 25, 1986
- President: Ferdinand Marcos
- Preceded by: Enrique Garcia
- Succeeded by: Alfredo Bengzon

Personal details
- Born: Jesus Cruz Azurin; December 20, 1916 Iloilo, Philippine Islands
- Died: February 13, 1990 (aged 73) Manila, Philippines
- Spouse: Frances Edna Calabiao Battung
- Education: University of the Philippines

Jesus Cruz Azurin (December 20, 1916 – February 13, 1990) was a Filipino medical doctor who was the Philippines’ Minister of Health from July 1981 to February 1986. In 1985, he was the recipient of the first Sasakawa Prize awarded by the World Health Organization (WHO) for achievements in the public health field. At the 38th World Health Assembly on May 9, 1985 at the Palais des Nations, Geneva, Switzerland, Dr. Azurin was cited for accomplishments that "have been recognized nationally and internationally". Among several specific achievements mentioned in the Award's citation were that "Dr. Azurin personally initiated and promoted a series of innovative measures to make primary health care a reality in the Philippines", that he "reorganized the Ministry of Health in order to decentralize its activities" and "vigorously supported... community projects to bring essential drugs within the reach of the population at an affordable cost", and that he pioneered in the effort that "led to the establishment of a research institute for tropical medicine in Manila, as a support to the Ministry's programme to control communicable diseases".

According to the Verbatim Record of the 38th World Health Assembly, “The Sasakawa Health Prize rewards innovative work in health development.” Dr. Azurin's transformation of the Philippine public health system is documented in his 1988 book Primary Health Care: Innovations in the Philippine Health System 1981–1985.

Azurin was involved in the WHO's smallpox eradication effort as a member of the Global Commission for the Eradication of Smallpox. He was a signatory to the historic document – signed in Geneva on December 9, 1979 – declaring smallpox to have been eradicated as a devastating disease of mankind.

== Early life ==
Azurin graduated with a Doctor of Medicine degree from the University of the Philippines’ College of Medicine in 1941. An officer in the Reserve Officers Training Corps (ROTC) of the University of the Philippines, Azurin volunteered for military service when war broke out in the Philippines on December 8, 1941. He joined the Philippine Army, serving as medical officer with the 1st Battalion, 1st Regular Infantry Division of the USAFFE (United States Armed Forces in the Far East) and saw action on Bataan. When Bataan fell to the Japanese in April 1942, he became one of the prisoners of war who suffered through the brutal Death March and he was incarcerated at the infamous Capas Concentration Camp in Tarlac province.

On his release from the Capas Camp in 1943, he joined the Filipino guerrilla movement in northern Luzon and served as Regimental Surgeon of the 11th Infantry, USAFIP-NL.

After the war, he decided to remain in the public service. He joined the Philippines’ Bureau of Quarantine as a Quarantine Medical Officer in 1947. In 1952, he was awarded a scholarship to New York's Columbia University to learn more about public health methods, procedures, and systems. He earned his master's degree in Public Health from Columbia University in 1953.

== Public Health Career ==
Azurin spent over 40 years in the public health service. He was named Director of the Philippines’ Bureau of Quarantine in 1955. During his tenure as Director – from 1955 to 1974 – Azurin participated in the continuous upgrading and revision of International Health Regulations (conducted in Geneva) that made international quarantine more effective and yet less restrictive on international trade. During this period, he studied yellow fever in Central and South America, smallpox, cholera, and plague in India, and quarantine methods in the United States and the United Kingdom.

From 1964 to 1972, he was Overall Coordinator of a joint Philippines-Japan-WHO Cholera-El Tor research project, the first and most extensive of its kind (over 550,000 in the study population). This landmark study removed public health authorities’ then intense fear of cholera and set the mode for its prevention, treatment, and management (including the efficacy of cholera vaccines).

Azurin served as Vice Chairman of the World Health Organization's executive board and also served as Chairman of two WHO Expert Committees: the WHO Expert Committee on Cholera and the WHO Expert Committee on International Quarantine. He participated in more than 60 international conferences on various public health issues and published several notable papers on public health and preventive medicine. Among his numerous citations are the ‘Order of the Bifurcated Needle’ given by the WHO in 1976 and the ‘Most Distinguished Alumnus Award’ given by the University of the Philippines’ College of Medicine in 1972.

Azurin was appointed Undersecretary of the Philippines’ Department of Health in 1974. In 1981, he was named Minister of the Ministry of Health (the Philippines had then shifted to a parliamentary form of government and departments had become ministries). After he retired in 1986, he continued working as an international health consultant for World Bank-financed projects to improve the health delivery systems of countries in Africa and the Middle East.

== Personal Information ==
While a member of the Filipino guerrilla forces during World War II, then 1st Lt. Azurin met Frances Edna C. Battung in a church in Aparri, Cagayan (on the northern tip of Luzon island) and married her on November 29, 1944. They had four sons (René, Andre, Michel, and Jesus Carlo) and six grandchildren. Azurin died on February 13, 1990. A street in Quezon City near his home for four decades has been named after him.

== Selected publications ==
Azurin, Jesus C., et al., “A Controlled Field Trial of the Effectiveness of Cholera and Cholera El Tor Vaccines in the Philippines” – World Health Organization Bulletin, Vol. 37, 1967.

Azurin, Jesus C., et al., “Studies on Cholera Carriers” – World Health Organization Bulletin, Vol. 37, No. 5, 1967.

Azurin, Jesus C., et al., “Some Observations on the Detection of Cholera Carriers” – World Health Organization Bulletin, Vol. 5, 1967.

Azurin, Jesus C., et al., “A Long-term Carrier of Cholera: Cholera Dolores – World Health Organization Bulletin Vol. 38, No. 6, 1968.

Azurin, Jesus C., et al, “A Controlled Field Trial of the Effectiveness of Cholera El Tor Vaccine” – World Health Organization Bulletin, Vol. 38, No.6, 1968. Azurin, Jesus C., et al., “Cholera Incidence in a Population Offered Cholera Vaccination Comparison of Cooperative and Uncooperative Groups” – World Health Organization Bulletin, Vol. 44, No.6, 1971. Azurin, Jesus C., et al., “A Controlled Field Trial of the Effectiveness of Monovalent Classical and El Tor Cholera Vaccines in the Philippines” – World Health Organization Bulletin, Vol. 49, No.1, 1973.

Azurin, Jesus C., et al., “Field Evaluation of Environmental Sanitation Measures Against Cholera” – World Health Organization Bulletin, Vol. 51, 1974.

Azurin, Jesus C., et al., “ Disinfection of Aircraft at ‘Blocks Away’ in Tropical Areas", World Health Organization Bulletin.

Azurin, Jesus C., “An Analysis of the New York Quarantine Station”, unpublished monograph, 1953.

Azurin, Jesus C., “Rodent Control Measures Along the Manila Bay Area”, Philippine Public Health Journal.

Azurin, Jesus C., “The Program of Cholera El Tor Eradication in the Philippines”, Philippine Journal of Public Health.

Azurin, Jesus C., Primary Health Care: Innovations in the Philippine Health System 1981–1985. J.C. Azurin Foundation, 1988.
