= Ceferino Padua =

Filipino labor lawyer, educator

Ceferino "Cefie" Padua Padua (died February 25, 2015) was a Filipino labor lawyer, educator, and delegate to the 1971 Constitutional Convention. He was the former president of the Lawyers against Monopoly and Poverty (LAMP) and served as a bar examiner on international and political law.

He was a member of the Liberal Party.

== Early life and education ==
Padua graduated with a law degree from the University of the Philippines. In 1947, he joined the Upsilon Sigma Phi.

Padua then studied at Harvard University under Henry Kissinger.

== Legal career ==
In 1956, Padua was Chief Legal Counsel of the Welfare Administration. He taught as a professor of Law and Liberal Arts at Francisco College, Manila (founded by Senator Vicente Francisco) where he occasionally wrote in its law journal. He also served as Assistant Attorney to the Francisco Law Office.

In 1957, Padua was appointed Solicitor at the Office of the Solicitor General.

In 2002, Padua questioned the validity of issuances made by the Toll Regulatory Board which authorized a 300%-increase in the toll rate collected at the South Luzon Tollway.

Padua served as president of the Lawyers Against Monopoly and Poverty (LAMP), a group of lawyers that aimed to "dismantle all forms of political, economic or social monopoly in the country." In 2012, Padua and LAMP questioned the constitutionality of the Priority Development Assistance Fund (PDAF) in the Philippines' General Appropriations Act for 2004.

== 1971 Constitutional Convention ==
In 1970, he was elected as a Delegate to the 1971 Constitutional Convention representing the first district of Rizal Province. At the time, it was reported that Padua was nearly ousted from his seat in the Constitutional Convention for supporting a "Ban-Marcos" resolution.

His views on the Philippine sea territory during the proceedings of the Constitutional Convention has been cited to support the Philippines' claims in relation to the Treaty of Paris.

== 1992 Philippine Senate election ==
In the 1992 Philippine Senate election, Padua ran as Senator under the Liberal-PDP-Laban Party. He later on withdrew from the race.

== Personal life and death ==
Padua was married to Nelie Balangue-Padua. They had four children: Belihu, Anthony, Reggie, and Blitz. Padua is the maternal grandfather of English actress Rachel Grant.

Padua died on February 25, 2015, at the age of 90.
