= Alfredo Bengzon =

Filipino physician (1935–2026)

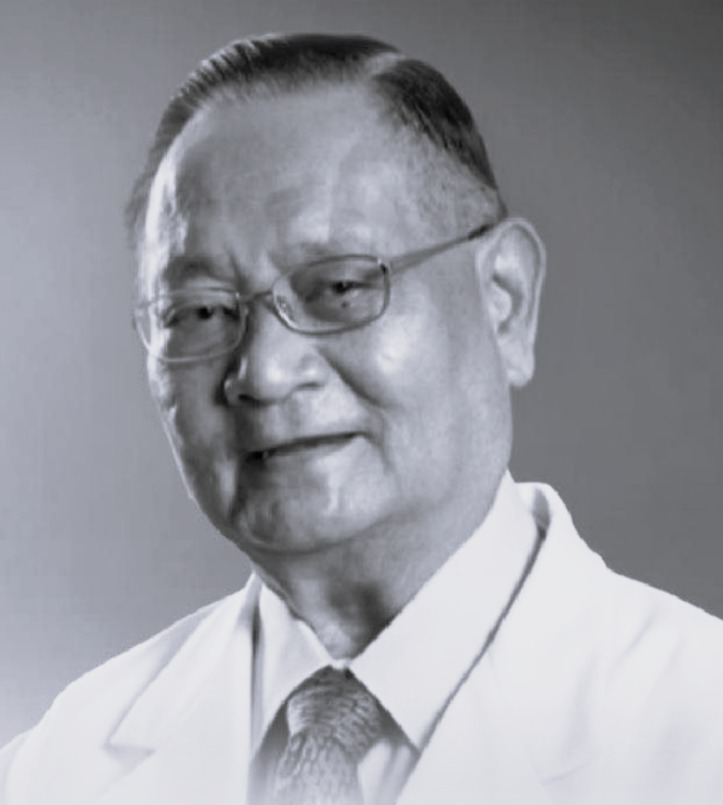

18th Minister/Secretary of Health
- In office March 25, 1986 – February 7, 1992
- Appointed by: Corazon Aquino
- Preceded by: Jesus Azurin
- Succeeded by: Antonio Periquet

Personal details
- Born: October 30, 1935
- Died: March 3, 2026 (aged 90)
- Party: Lakas (1992)
- Occupation: Hospital executive, medical professor and academic
- Profession: Doctor

Alfredo Rafael Antonio Bengzon (October 20, 1935 – March 3, 2026), also known as Alfredo R. A. Bengzon, was a Filipino physician, educator and public official. He also served as Vice-President for the Professional Schools of Ateneo de Manila University, dean of the Ateneo School of Medicine and Public Health, dean emeritus of the Ateneo Graduate School of Business, and President and CEO of The Medical City.

== Education ==
Bengzon graduated from the Ateneo de Manila in 1956 with a Bachelor of Arts degree. He attended the University of the Philippines College of Medicine at UP Manila where he got his doctor of medicine degree, and then completed his master of business administration degree at the Ateneo Graduate School of Business in 1972.

== Career ==
Bengzon had a long and distinguished career not only as a neurologist but also as leader and manager in both private and public sectors.

He was Secretary of Health, Peace Commissioner, and vice-chair of the Philippine Negotiating Panel for the U.S. Military Facilities during the presidency of Corazon C. Aquino. He has also served as chief operating officer of several private companies engaged in health services. In mid-1986, Aquino appointed Bengzon to head a board of inquiry to investigate the attempted coup of Arturo Tolentino at the Manila Hotel.

Bengzon ran unsuccessfully in the 1992 Philippine Senate election, placing 25th, just 900 votes short of senator Butz Aquino who placed 24th among the 24 contested seats. It is the closest margin between a winner and a losing candidate in election history. He contested his loss in an electoral protest but later withdrew it.

In 1993, Bengzon was appointed Dean of the Ateneo Graduate School of Business and Vice-President for the Professional Schools of the Ateneo de Manila University.

Later he was President and CEO of The Medical City. In 2007, he also founded the Ateneo School of Medicine and Public Health (ASMPH) and became its first Dean. ASMPH is the first medical school in the Philippines that seeks to bridge the gap between medicine and public health by producing doctors who are not only outstanding clinicians but also dynamic managers and social catalysts, three qualities that Bengzon himself exemplified in his career.

== Death ==
Bengzon died on March 3, 2026, at the age of 90.

== Recognition ==
In 1989, Bengzon was awarded the degree of Doctor of Science (honoris causa) by the Ateneo de Manila.

In 1991, he was conferred the Ramon Magsaysay Award.

In 2010, he was awarded the Lux In Domino Award by the Ateneo de Manila University.

In 2012, he received the 2012 Lifetime Achievement Award of Asia CEO.
