= Koalisyong Pambansa =

Political alliance in Philippines in 1992 supporting Jovito Salonga

- Leader: Jovito Salonga; Aquilino Pimentel Jr.
- Founded: 1992
- Dissolved: 1992
- Headquarters: Metro Manila
- Ideology: Liberalism; Social democracy Progressivism
- Political position: Center-left
- Coalition members: Liberal; PDP–Laban

The Koalisyong Pambansa (LP–PDP, from the acronyms of the constituent parties; transl. National Coalition) was the coalition formed by the Liberal Party (LP) and the PDP–Laban for the 1992 Philippine general election. The coalition was seen to lean left-of-center. It emerged as a coalition between activists and liberals, supporting candidates who explicitly adopted progressive positions.

== History ==
The coalition nominated Jovito Salonga of the Liberal Party for president, and PDP–Laban founder Aquilino Pimentel Jr. for vice president. It had a 23-person slate for the Senate election, and had common candidates in the House of Representatives elections. The coalition was cash strapped, as both Salonga and Pimentel voted to evict the U.S. bases in the country, a move which was unfavorably seen by the business community. Both Salonga and Pimentel ultimately lost, with Salonga finishing sixth of seven candidates, just behind Imelda Marcos, the former first lady. Wigberto Tañada won the coalition's sole seat in the Senate, and several congressmen and local officials won.

== Candidates ==
Name	Name
Florencio Abad	Oscar Morado
Macapanton Abbas	Ceferino Padua, Jr. (withdraw)
Miguel Acebedo	Nemesio Prudente
Gerardo del Mundo	Wilfredo Rafols
Florangel Rosario-Braid	Ruperto Martin
Jesus Antonio M. Carpio Sr	Reynaldo San Juan
Raul Contreras	Ponciano Subido
Elfren Cruz	Ramon Tagle, Jr.
Camilo Diel	Wigberto Tañada
Genaro Mabasa	Lorna Verano Yap
Ramon Garcia	Victor Ziga
Alfredo Zerrudo	Melchor Chavez (disqualified)
