= Nora Daza =

Filipina chef, restaurateur and media personality (1928-2013)

- Born: Nora Guanzon Villanueva; December 2, 1928; Batangas, Philippine Islands
- Died: September 13, 2013 (aged 84); Manila, Philippines
- Resting place: Loyola Memorial, Quezon City
- Education: University of the Philippines; Cornell University
- Occupations: Chef, restaurateur, TV host
- Years active: 1948–1958; Hiatus: 1958–1992; 1992–2004
- Known for: Filipino Cookbooks; Filipino Fine Dining
- Political party: Nacionalista (1992)
- Spouse(s): Gabriel Daza, Jr. (deceased)
- Children: Gabriel "Bong" Daza III; Alejandro "Sandy" Daza; Mariles Daza-Enriquez; Stella Daza-Belda; Nina Daza-Puyat
- Parent(s): Alejandro Jose Villanueva (father); Encarnacion Guanzon (mother)
- Relatives: Isabelle Daza (granddaughter)

Nora Guanzon Villanueva-Daza (December 2, 1928 – September 13, 2013), popularly known as Chef Nora Daza, was a Filipino veteran gourmet chef, restaurateur, socio-civic leader, television host, and best-selling cookbook author. Daza was considered as the Philippines' first culinary icon, and was also known as the "Julia Child of the Philippines" and the Philippines' first "culinary ambassador".

== Early life ==
Daza was born in Batangas, to Alejandro Jose Villanueva, a civil engineer from Batangas City, and his wife Encarnacion Guanzon, daughter of Olympio Guanzon former Governor of Pampanga. Her mother Guanzon never learned how to cook, but Daza persuaded her mother to collect recipes for her at a young age. As young as 8, Daza began cooking pancakes for her family, neighbours, and parent's friends.

== Education ==
In 1952, Daza graduated from the University of the Philippines with a Bachelor's degree in Home Economics. She learned about Filipino cooking and catering while working at the University of the Philippines cafeteria. She then went to the United States to study at Cornell University in Ithaca, New York, for a Master of Science in Restaurant and Institutional Management. At Cornell, she became a member of the Phi Kappa Phi honor society, and was in the top 10 of her class.

Daza later studied French cuisine in Paris, under the tutelage of Simone Beck, and Louisette Bertholle. Beck and Bertholle were co-authors of Julia Child's Mastering the Art of French Cooking, further cementing Daza being known as the "Julia Child of the Philippines." While living in Paris, Daza would drive an Austin Mini.

== Career ==
Daza was the first tri-media star of the sixties and seventies in the Philippines, with her best-selling cookbooks; TV cooking shows At Home with Nora, Bahala si Mommy, and Cooking It Up with Nora; radio shows At Home with Nora and At Home with the Stars; and columns for Women's Magazine, The Manila Chronicle, and The Philippine Daily Inquirer. Her cooking showcased the diverse history and ethnic makeup of the Philippines, as well as her American education and French training, by utilizing Filipino, Chinese, "Chinoy", Spanish, American, and Italian cuisines.

Daza became a judge of cooking contests held by the Manila Gas Corporation from 1957 to 1960. She hosted television cooking shows At Home with Nora and Cooking It Up with Nora to wide popular acclaim and viewership for several years. She was appointed Director of Manila Gas Cooking School where she selected, modified, checked, and kitchen-tested over five-hundred recipes for around three thousand students who enrolled over a period of four years.

In 1965, Daza opened Au Bon Vivant (The Good Life) in Ermita. Au Bon Vivant was reputedly the first restaurant in Manila to offer authentic French cuisine. She also opened up a Filipino restaurant in Manila called Galing Galing, that served Filipino comfort food such as kare-kare. Galing Galing later burned down, and with it Daza's recipe book collection. In 1974, Daza expanded her operation in the Philippines and opened an Au Bon Vivant in the NCR's business hub Makati.

In 1972, she opened Aux Iles Philippines (The Philippine Islands), the first Filipino restaurant in Paris. Daza gave her eldest son, Gabriel "Bong" Daza, 22-years-old at the time, full responsibility of Aus Iles Philippines. Aus Iles Philippines earned three forks in the Michelin Guide, was declared an outstanding restaurant by the Gault-Millau restaurant guide, and received praise from Le Monde and the International Herald Tribune. French Actress Brigitte Bardot and French Philosopher Simone de Beauvoir were a notable regulars.

In 1975, the Marcos Government asked her to open and run the Maharlika on the ground floor of the Philippine Center, in Manhattan, New York. Maharlika was the first Filipino fine-dining restaurant in New York and was named after the pre-colonial Filipino Maharlika martial class of freemen. Myra Waldo, author of the Restaurant Guide to New York City and Vicinity, and then food and travel editor of WCBS (AM) radio, described Maharlika as among the top restaurants in the city.

Daza's pioneering of haute Filipino cuisine in New York and Paris, and bringing Parisian cuisine to Manila led some to dub her the "Philippines' first culinary ambassador." In the sixties and seventies, Daza would bring some of the world's top chefs to the Philippines including Paul Bocuse and Gaston LeNôtre.

Daza was elected vice president of the Philippine Association of Nutrition, secretary of the Hotel and Restaurant Association of the Philippines, adviser-admiral of the Homemakers Club, director of Hotel and Tourist Industries of the Philippines, and president of Philippine Home Economists in Business.

In 1992, Daza's friend from U.P. vice-president Salvador "Doy" Laurel asked her to run for the Senate of the Philippines under the Nacionalista Party. She ran on the platform "Proper Nutrition for the Masses," but ended up losing the race.

== Private life ==
Daza's son, Sandy Daza, is a chef and restaurateur specializing in Filipino and Thai cuisines. He has hosted television cooking shows and has written books and articles on cooking and baking. Daza's other son, Bong Daza, is a food entrepreneur specializing in processed meats and fish. He is the estranged husband of Miss Universe 1969 winner Gloria Diaz. He ran for vice-mayor of Makati in 1998 but lost in the elections. Her granddaughter Isabelle Daza is also a TV host. Her grandson Turs is also a TV host and a VJ on MYX Channel.

== Personal life ==
She was married to Gabriel "Boy" Daza, Jr. whom she met in university.

She was survived by her children Gabriel "Bong" Daza III, Inquirer Lifestyle food columnist Alejandro "Sandy" Daza, Mariles Daza-Enriquez, Stella Daza-Belda and Nina Daza-Puyat; and grandchildren Arturo "Turs" Daza, Ali Daza, Joseph Puyat, Gio Puyat, Billie Puyat, Mario Puyat, Bolo Belda, Franco Daza, Bettina Belda, Toby Belda, Danielle Daza, Isabelle Daza, Ava Daza, Raphael Daza, Eduardo Taylor and Rodrigo Enriquez.

== Death ==
Daza died on September 13, 2013, in her sleep due to a heart attack. She was 84 years old. Daza's body lay in state at the Loyola Memorial Chapel on Commonwealth Avenue in Quezon City and was cremated.

== Publication ==
- Let's Cook with Nora. National Book Store, 1965.
- Let's Cook with Nora. Improved Edition. National Book Store, 1969.
- Galing Galing Philippine Cuisine: Food as Prepared in Philippine Homes. National Book Store Manila, 1974.
- The Best of the Maya Cookfest. Asia Book Corp of America, 1981
- Nora V. Daza A Culinary Life: Personal Recipe Collection with Michaela Fenix. Anvil Publishing, 1992.
- Festive Dishes: Nora V. Daza with family and friends. Anvil Publishing, 2011.
