= Buddy Gomez =

Philippine journalist, businessman, and politician (1935–2021)

Tomas "Buddy" Bayhon Gomez III
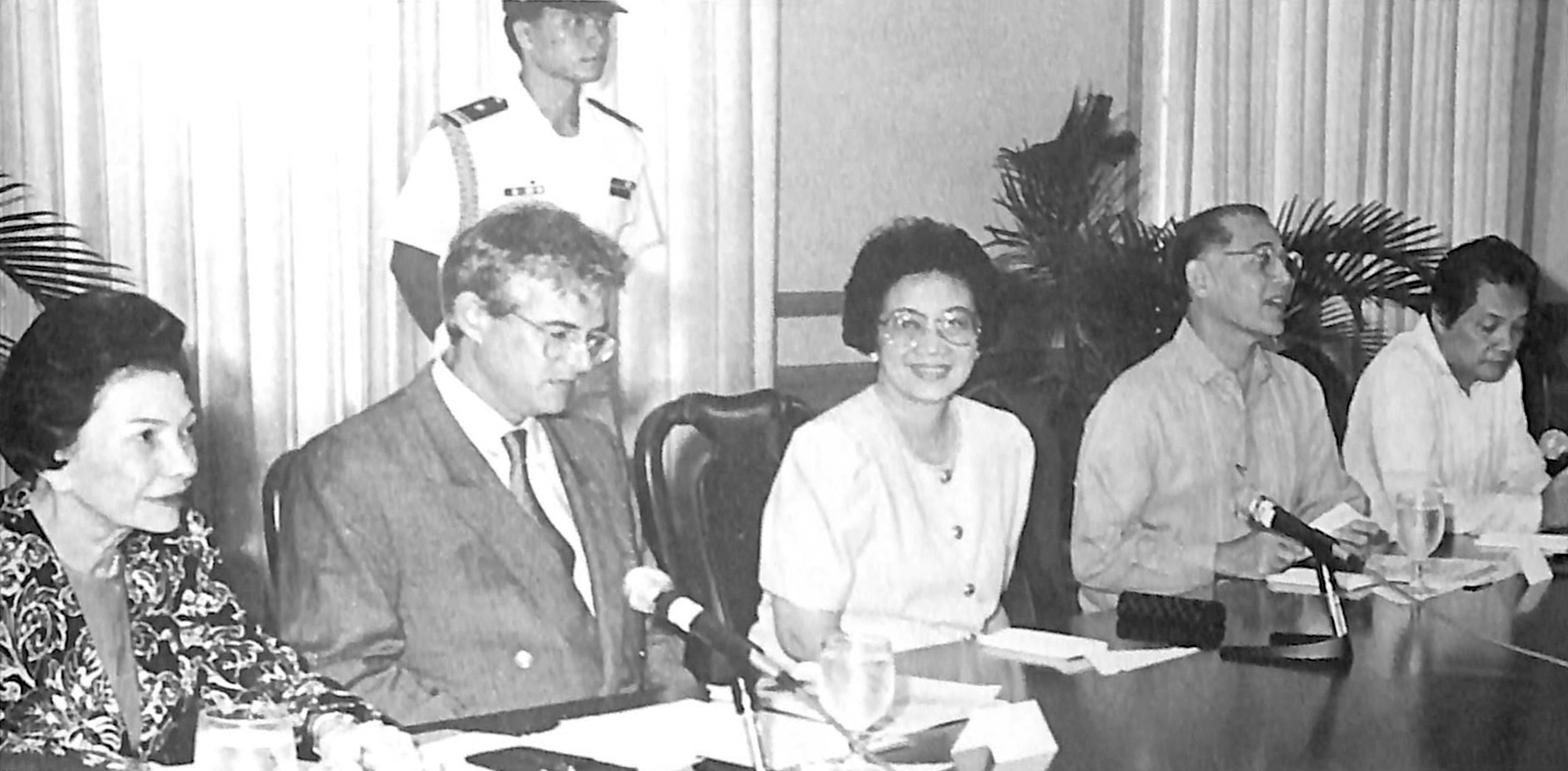
- Buddy Gomez (second from right) on November 11, 1991

Presidential Press Secretary
- In office January 4, 1990 – February 11, 1992
- President: Corazon Aquino
- Preceded by: Adolfo S. Azcuna
- Succeeded by: Horacio V. Paredes (acting)

Personal details
- Born: Tomas Gomez III; March 25, 1935 Calbayog, Samar, Philippines
- Died: July 22, 2021 (aged 86) Arzúa, Galicia, Spain
- Party: Lakas–CMD
- Spouse(s): Teresita Policarpio Samson (m.1962); Mary Egloff (?–2021)
- Children: 7

Tomas "Buddy" Bayhon Gomez III (March 25, 1935 – July 22, 2021) was a Philippine journalist, businessman, and politician, who most notably served in a number of posts in the administration of Corazon Aquino.

== Early life and career ==
Gomez was born on March 25, 1935, in Calbayog, Samar, to a prominent family. He is the son of Tomas Arquiza Gomez Jr. and Helen Rowland Bayhon. His grandfather was Senator Tomas Gomez, Sr., who represented Samar in the Commonwealth Senate.

He began his career in 1957 at DZCA Radio Reloj, which at the time was owned by the ABS-CBN network. In 1961 he began working as a management trainee at Ayala Corporation, where he would remain for 25 years. He spent much of that time working directly with the corporation's then-chief executive Enrique Zobel, first as his executive assistant and then in a number of more senior posts. By 1972 he was Manager of the Commercial Centers Division (now Ayala Malls); executive director of the Filipinas Foundation (now the Ayala Foundation), and the firm's Public Relations Director. In that year he was forced to go into an "involuntary exile" as a result of the imposition of martial law, continuing to work for Ayala abroad for a number years before eventually returning to the Philippines.

In April 1986, he was appointed by new President Corazon Aquino as the Consul-General of the Philippines in Honolulu, Hawaii. The position was an important one, not only because of sizable Filipino community in Hawaii, but because former President Ferdinand Marcos had taken up exile there, along with as well as his family and 89-person strong entourage. As such, Gomez acted as Aquino's "eyes and ears", keeping tabs on the ex-president. Colonel Arturo Aruiza, a Marcos confidant who joined the former dictator in Hawaii, described Gomez as a "plague in our lives, whose chief preoccupation was to keep track of our doings." During his tenure Gomez acquired a reputation as a "financial freak", who cut the consulate's headcount, and forwent his housing allowance (instead living on the consulate's second floor) in order to supplement those of his remaining staff. His vision of converting part of the historic consulate building into a museum and archive dedicated to the Filipino community in Hawaii, however, was unfulfilled at the time of his recall in December 1989, shortly after Marcos's death.

After returning to the Philippines, President Aquino appointed Gomez as her Presidential Press Secretary in January 1990. He was also appointed as Cabinet Officer for Regional Development (CORD) for Metro Manila, during which time he supported the election of Ignacio Bunye (who had worked for Gomez at Ayala in the 1970s) as Chairman of the Metropolitan Manila Authority. He served in both posts for just over two years until February 1992, when he stepped down to pursue a bid, backed by outgoing President Aquino, for the Senate in the May 1992 elections, hoping to follow in his grandfather's footsteps, as a candidate of the Lakas party. Although the Lakas presidential candidate, Fidel V. Ramos, was elected, the party struggled in the legislative elections, winning just two seats. Gomez came 49th, with 1.7 million votes and 5.8% of the vote, in a race where there were 24 seats up for election, and was not elected.

Following the election, he was appointed as president and Chairman of the then state-owned Intercontinental Broadcasting Corporation by President Ramos, serving for a number of years. Sometime in the 1990s, he emigrated to the United States, settling in San Antonio, Texas, working in the hospitality industry and as an antique furniture restorer. In later life, he returned to journalism, writing the "CyberBuddy" blog on Philippine history and culture for the ABS-CBN News website.

== Personal life and death ==
Gomez had four children with his first wife Teresita Samson - Maria Elena Gomez-Pulgar, Tomas "Mitch" Gomez IV, Karen Gomez-Dumpit, (former commissioner of the Commission on Human Rights), and Teresa Gomez-Coscolluela, and three children by his second wife Mary Egloff- Jose Maria Sebastian Gomez, Edward Joseph Gomez and Malia Gomez.

Gomez died on July 22, 2021, while undertaking the Camino de Santiago pilgrimage in Galicia, Spain, during the Year of Mercy in honor of St. James. Having departed from the town of Sarria on July 18, Gomez had completed 75 kilometers out of the 115 kilometers to Santiago de Compostela by the time he reached the town of Arzúa, where he died on the night of July 22 in a pilgrims' hostel. Gomez had chronicled his pilgrimage on his blog prior to his death, and following his death, his children went on to complete the remaining 40 kilometers in his memory obtaining his pilgrim's certificate posthumously.
