= Katrina Legarda =

Filipino lawyer

Personal details
- Party: Nationalist People's Coalition (1992)
- Profession: Lawyer

Katrina Legarda is a prominent Filipino lawyer who specializes in family law, and is an advocate of the rights of women and children.

== Education ==
She graduated from the University of Bristol, England (B.A Hons., History) in 1975, and obtained her degree in law from the University of the Philippines College of Law. She joined the Angara Abello Concepcion Regala and Cruz Law offices (ACCRALAW) in 1981 and left a Partner in 1992.

== Legal career ==
She is the Founding Chair of the Child Justice League, a foundation that provides free legal assistance to abused children and children in conflict with the law. She is also a founding member of the CASA/GAL- Philippines Foundation, Inc. She is a member of the Rotary Club and the Iota Tau Tau International Legal Sorority. She is the President of the U.P. Women Lawyers' Circle (an organization of women lawyers who are graduates of the University of the Philippines that provides free legal assistance to women and children, as well as funding a jail decongestion program for children in conflict with the law). Katrina was a member of the board of Museo Pambata (a museum for children in Manila), and is a faculty member of the Child Protection Unit Network, Inc. (CPU-Net). She is a member of the Research Committee of the Philippine Judicial Academy.

Under the auspices of the UNICEF, PLAN International, the British Embassy (Manila) and UNIFEM, she trains judges, prosecutors, social workers and police personnel around the country (as well as in Vientiane, Lao PDR, Goa, India and Lahore, Pakistan) on the investigation of crimes involving women and children.

She is a Professor in the College of Medicine of the University of the Philippines teaching Medical Jurisprudence and also a Professor at De La Salle University Tañada-Diokno School of Law, the College of Law of the Pamantasan Ng Lungsod ng Maynila (PLM), and Lyceum of the Philippines University-Makati (LPU) teaching Persons and Family Relations and Legal Writing. She is also a Professor in the College of Law of the University of the Philippines, teaching Persons and Family Relations.

== Media career ==
She once hosted, pro bono, an hourly legal segment on the radio station Crossover 105.1, called “Legal Log.” She has written for the Sunday Times, The Manila Times, SAVVY Magazine, K Magazine, the Business World, and the People’s Tonight. She has a legal segment on the ABS-CBN morning show, Umagang Kay Ganda, every Monday morning. She writes a column for ABS-CBN Interactive called "Kat's Eye." She contributes to various other newspapers and magazines for articles on family law. She co-authored A Time to Love, A Time to Leave (a book on marriage and divorce “Philippine-style”) with Jullie Yap-Daza, and is an essayist for Women with Fire (edited by Lorna Kalaw-Tirol) and Pinay: Autobiographical Narratives by Women Writers, 1926-1998 (edited by Cristina Pantoja-Hidalgo). She was the host of a legal talk show on the ABS-CBN News Channel entitled By Demand, and a co-host on ABS-CBN Channel 2 of a news and current affairs talk show entitled Off The Record.

== Awards ==
She has received Soroptimist International awards: “Woman Helping Women” and “Woman Advancing the Status of Women.” She is a Parangal Ng Bayan Awardee for 1999 and is featured as one of the Leaders of the Millennium in the 2000 Philippine Year Book.

She was the Chairperson of the 7th ISPCAN Asian Regional Conference that was held in Manila, Philippines, in September 2007.

== Personal life ==
Katrina Legarda has three children. Her grandmother was Trinidad Fernandez Legarda.

== Filmography ==
=== TV shows ===
- Off The Record (2000-2001)
- By Demand (2002-2004)
