= Mamintal A. J. Tamano =

Filipino politician (1928–1994)

The Honorable Mamintal A. J. Tamano
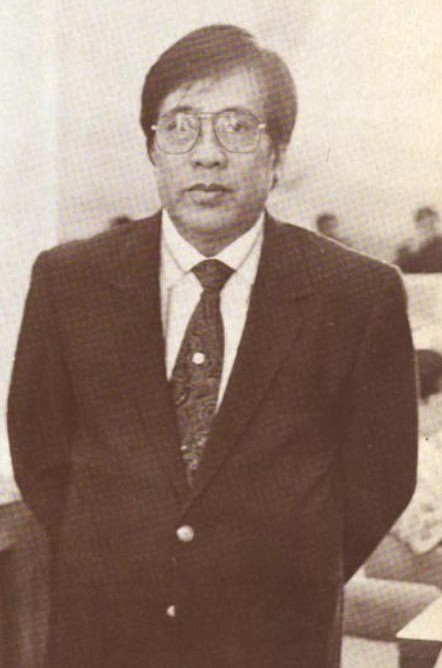
- Tamano as a senator, photograph released by the Philippine Congress, c. 1988

Senator of the Philippines
- In office July 6, 1987 – June 30, 1992
- In office December 30, 1969 – September 23, 1972

Vice Governor of Lanao del Sur
- In office December 30, 1959 – December 30, 1969
- Governor: Abdul Ghafur Madki Alonto (1959–1967); Linang Mandangan (1967–1969)
- Preceded by: Office established

Personal details
- Born: December 25, 1928 Tamparan, Lanao, Philippine Islands
- Died: May 18, 1994 (aged 65) Manila, Philippines
- Party: LDP (1992–1994); Nacionalista (1959–1992); UNIDO (1980–1988)
- Spouse: Hadja Putri Zorayda Abbas
- Children: 9, including Adel
- Relatives: Ombra Tamano (brother)
- Education: University of the Philippines Diliman; Cornell University
- Occupation: Politician
- Profession: Lawyer

Mamintal Abdul Jabbar Tamano (December 25, 1928 – May 18, 1994) was a Filipino politician and a former Senator of the Philippines.

== Early life and education ==
Tamano was born in Tamparan, Lanao. He graduated valedictorian at the Lanao High School in 1947. He obtained a Bachelor of Arts degree in 1952 and a Bachelor of Laws degree the following year, both from the University of the Philippines. He was a member of the Upsilon Sigma Phi fraternity. He also obtained a Master of Laws at Cornell University in 1958.

== Career and political life ==
In 1954, he was appointed as justice of the peace of Marantao, Lanao. In 1959, he became a provincial secretary. That same year, he was elected as vice-governor of the newly formed province of Lanao del Sur, serving until 1969.

He was elected as Senator in 1969 but he was unable to finish his term because President Ferdinand Marcos declared martial law. During the martial law years, he went on self-exile to Saudi Arabia staying there until 1986, when Marcos was ousted by the People Power Revolution. Shortly afterwards, he became a member of President Corazon Aquino's cabinet as Deputy Minister of Foreign Relations.

In 1987, he was elected again to the Senate. As a Senator, he worked for the autonomy for the Muslims and the rest of Mindanao and on Mindanao's natural resources to upgrade the conditions of that islands. He was the principal author of Republic Act 6848, which provided for the charter of the Al-Amanah Islamic Investment Bank of the Philippines.

In the 1992 elections, he sought reelection as senator under the Laban ng Demokratikong Pilipino ticket, but lost.

== Personal life ==
Senator Tamano was married to Haji Putri Zorayda Abbas with whom he had nine children, including Atty. Adel Tamano former president of Pamantasan ng Lungsod ng Maynila and current chief administrative officer of Dito Telecommunity, who unsuccessfully sought election to the Philippine Senate in 2010.

== Death ==
He died of cerebral hemorrhage on May 18, 1994.
