= Wencelito Andanar =

Filipino lawyer and politician (1947–2021)

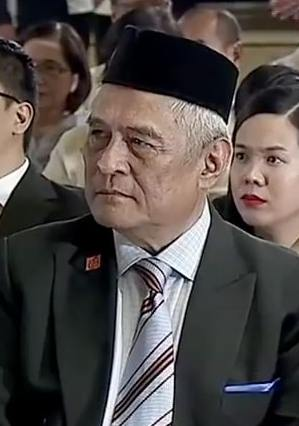
- Andanar in 2018

Governor of Surigao del Norte
- Officer-in-charge
- In office 1986–1988
- Preceded by: Rolando Geotina
- Succeeded by: Moises Ecleo

Personal details
- Born: Wencelito Tan Andanar; December 2, 1947
- Died: April 17, 2021 (aged 73)
- Children: including Martin

Wencelito Tan Andanar (December 2, 1947 – April 22, 2021) was a Filipino lawyer and politician who served as officer-in-charge (OIC) governor of Surigao del Norte from 1986 to 1988. He also served as chairman of the Philippine Coconut Authority (PCA) from 1982 to 1992, presidential assistant during the administration of Corazon Aquino and an undersecretary of the Department of the Interior and Local Government from 2001 to 2007. His last government position was as special envoy of President Rodrigo Duterte to Malaysia from 2018 until his death in 2021.

== Career ==
Andanar was appointed chairman of the Philippine Coconut Authority in 1982. In 1986, following the People Power Revolution, he was designated by President Cory Aquino to be the OIC-governor of Surigao del Norte serving until the 1988 local elections. From 1989 to 1992, he served as a presidential assistant under Cory Aquino's administration. He was also the deputy secretary general of the Laban ng Demokratikong Pilipino.

He ran for the Senate in 1992 but lost gaining only 1,711,611 votes which placed him 48th in the race. During his campaign, he faced issues related to his term as PCA chairman. A leader of a nationwide coconut industry association accused him of secretly collecting a levy of ₱1 for every 100 kilos of copra sold by coconut farmers starting in 1988. He was also asked to explain alleged fund misuse and anomalies at the PCA during his term which included unjustified expenditures totaling ₱92-million as reported by the Commission on Audit.

In 2001, he was appointed by President Gloria Macapagal Arroyo to the Department of the Interior and Local Government as the undersecretary for peace and order. In a cabinet shake-up in 2006, he became the acting Secretary of the Interior and Local Government prior to the appointment of Ronaldo Puno. Later, he became the deputy secretary of the alliance between the United Nationalist Alliance and PDP–Laban. In the 2007 House of Representatives elections, he ran for a congressional seat representing Surigao del Norte's 2nd congressional district but lost. On election day, his wife Annie and daughter survived an ambush attempt in San Francisco, Surigao del Norte.

In 2016, a case against Andanar was withdrawn by the Ombudsman. The case stemmed from an alleged failure of Andanar to declare a property in his 2004 and 2005 Statement of Assets, Liabilities and Net Worth however state prosecutors concluded that it was just an error in the property's title.

In 2018, President Duterte appointed Andanar to be his special envoy to Malaysia. He was reappointed in 2019. During his time as special envoy, he helped in linking the Bangsamoro with international markets and was active in the repatriation efforts of overseas Filipinos in Malaysia during the COVID-19 pandemic.

Andanar was a member of the Upsilon Sigma Phi fraternity and the father of Presidential Communications Operations Office Secretary Martin Andanar.

== Death ==
He died on the morning of April 22, 2021 at the Veterans Memorial Medical Center in Quezon City due to liver cancer.
