= Francisco Chavez =

Filipino lawyer and former Solicitor General

Frank Chavez
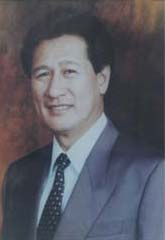

Solicitor General of the Philippines
- In office March 5, 1987 – February 5, 1992
- President: Corazon Aquino
- Preceded by: Sedfrey A. Ordoñez
- Succeeded by: Ramon S. Desuasido

Personal details
- Born: Francisco Ibrado Chavez; February 6, 1947 Sagay, Negros Occidental, Philippines
- Died: September 11, 2013 (aged 66) Pasig, Metro Manila, Philippines
- Party: Reporma–LM (1998–present); Lakas–NUCD (1992)
- Spouse: Ma. Juanita "Jean" Rivera-Chavez
- Children: 3
- Education: West Negros College (BA); University of the Philippines Diliman (LL.B)
- Occupation: Lawyer; Politician

Francisco "Frank" Chavez (6 February 1947 – 11 September 2013) was a Filipino lawyer. He was the Solicitor General of the Philippines during the Aquino administration.

== Early life ==
Born as Francisco Ibrado Chavez in Bateria, Sagay, Negros Occidental on February 6, 1947.

== Educational life ==
Frank Chavez finished his high school education in the University of Negros Occidental-Recoletos, graduating salutatorian in 1961. He then went to the West Negros College in Bacolod for his college education, graduating summa cum laude in 1967 with a degree in Bachelor of Arts major in English. He earned his Bachelor of Laws degree from the University of the Philippines, graduating cum laude in 1971. He was admitted to the Philippine Bar in 1972.

He was the youngest bar examiner at age of 38 when he served as examiner in remedial law during the 1985 Bar examinations. In 1986, he was named one of the Ten Outstanding Young Men (TOYM) of the country for his achievements in his chosen field of law and human rights. He is one of the founders of the Brotherhood of Nationalistic, Involved and Free Attorneys to Combat Injustice and Oppression (BONIFACIO) which provided free legal assistance to human rights violation victims. He is a partner in the Sycip Salazar Hernandez and Gatmaitan Law Offices and a founding partner of the Chavez Laureta & Associates law office.

== Timeline ==
Frank’s political activism was evident as a student demonstrator against the rule of Ferdinand Marcos. As First Quarter Stormer, he joined the student mass action on January 30, 1970, the First Battle of Mendiola Bridge. He was one of those manning the barricades when Metrocom soldiers stormed the University of the Philippines campus. His participation in numerous rallies notwithstanding, he finished the law course, cum laude, at the UP in 1971. Earlier, in 1967, he obtained a bachelor of science degree, cum laude from the West Negros College in Bacolod.

During the martial law years, he represented in court pro-bono more than 500 detainees who were hauled to various courts on trumped-up charges of sedition, rebellion, inciting to sedition, etc. by the Marcos regime (September 1983 to March 1986). He handled press freedom, religious freedom and the Lino Brocka cases, plus the Escalante massacre case and “mistrial of the century case” in 1985, the ban-Marcos proclamation case in February 1986, and he was a tireless, fearless street parliamentarian. These “fight for freedom and justice” involvements earned him the 1987 Ten Outstanding Young Men of the Philippines (TOYM) award for law and human rights. But importantly, they convinced President Corazon C. Aquino to appoint him as the youngest Solicitor General, from 1987 to 1992. As SolGen, he worked for the winning of 74 of the 81 government/policy cases decided by the Philippine Supreme Court. At the end of his term, President Aquino thanked him “most sincerely for the services you have rendered to the Government as Solicitor General with unwavering courage and impeccable integrity.”

He is known for his anti-graft and corruption exposes, which resulted in a complete revamp of the Presidential Committee on Good Government; the Philippine Air Lines scam of P2.2 billion, resulting in the dismissal of top ranking PAL executives, and the cessation of the small town lottery system, among others. He exposed the “immoral, illegal and unconstitutional” secret agreements between the PCGG and the Marcoses, and exposed the existence of $13.2 billion (as of June 1998) found in account No. 885931 of the Union Bank of Switzerland maintained under the name of a Marcos daughter. Said account was closed as of April 2001 with the Swiss Federal for Justice launching an investigation on the attempted transfer of funds from said account to the Deutsche Bank in Duesseldorf, Germany.

In 2010, he exposed the graft and corruption practices in government by Villaraza, Cruz, Marcelo and Angangco Law Offices, also known as "The Firm", of which his brods in Sigma Rho are partners. "The Firm" and Chavez filed several cases against each other.

== Personal life ==
He was married to Ma. Juanita "Jean" Rivera-Chavez with 3 daughters: Katrina, Tippi and Ingrid Chavez. His sons-in-law: Bern Reyes and Nico Lacson. His grandsons: Frank Ethan, Dylan Michael and Liam Duncan.

== Career history ==
- Founding Partner: Chavez Laureta & Associates (now Chavez Miranada Aseoche Law Offices)
- Partner: Sycip Salazar Hernandez and Gatmaitan Law Offices (1979–1987)
- Bar examiner (Remedial Law): Philippine Bar (1985)
- Member of the board of directors: Central Cement Corporation (1989–1991)
- Member of the board of directors: Philippine Charity Sweepstakes Office (1988–1991)
- Member of the board of directors: Philippine Air Lines (1988–1991)
- Solicitor General: Office of the Solicitor General (March 1987 – February 1992)
- Member of the board of directors: Petron-Aramco (1994–1997)

== Affiliations ==
- Philippine Bar Association: Member
- Operation Clean Hands – a campaign for removing corruption from the Judiciary of the Philippines: Founder
- Brotherhood Of Nationalistic, Involved and Free Attorneys To Combat Injustice And Oppression (BONIFACIO): Founder and former chairman
- The Executive Toastmasters Club of Makati: Former president
- Rotary Club of Makati: Member

== Death ==
Chavez died of a stroke on the night of September 11, 2013 at the age of 66. He had been hospitalized since July of that year at The Medical City – Ortigas in Pasig due to his bout with lymphoma. His remains were cremated and his ashes were interred at The Heritage Park in Taguig.

== Website ==
- Frank Chavez' website
