= Oliver Lozano =

Filipino lawyer

- Born: May 13, 1940; Ilocos Norte, Philippine Commonwealth
- Died: April 12, 2018 (aged 77); Quezon City, Metro Manila, Philippines
- Education: University of the Philippines
- Occupation: lawyer
- Political party: Kilusang Bagong Lipunan
- Spouse: Norma Junio Lozano

Oliver "Oli" Ocol Lozano (May 13, 1940 – April 12, 2018) was a Filipino lawyer who was the legal counsel of the Philippine president Ferdinand Marcos. In 1986, Lozano participated in a coup attempt against President Corazon Aquino at the Manila Hotel, and two weeks later, led a rally of Marcos loyalists in Rizal Park that resulted in the death of Stephen Salcedo. In 2001, Lozano attempted to lead pro-Joseph Estrada rallies against his ouster as president during EDSA II, and after Estrada's arrest, he participated in EDSA III protests that led to an attempt by a mob of Estrada supporters to storm Malacañang Palace.

Born in Ilocos Norte, he attempted to run for the Senate under the Kilusang Bagong Lipunan in 2004 and 2007, but lost both times. He filed six impeachment complaints against Gloria Macapagal Arroyo: one in 2000 during her vice presidency, and five from 2005 to 2008 amidst the Hello Garci scandal during her presidency. He also filed two impeachment complaints against president Noynoy Aquino and one against Chief Justice Renato Corona, but in 2017 he denounced the impeachment complaint filed against president Rodrigo Duterte.

== Education and career ==
Lozano graduated elementary and high school at Dingras Elementary and High School, respectively. He earned his Law and Bachelor of Arts degrees at the University of the Philippines.

As a practicing lawyer for 40 years, he was legal counsel for Philippine Consumers’ Foundation, Unification Movement, World Unification Church, Apostolic Catholic Church, Jesus is Lord Crusaders, The Lord Jesus Christ, The Great Commission World Ministry Inc., Active Civilian Force, Inc., Economic Recovery Action Program, Inc., Motherland International Foundation, Inc., National Organization of Women Agenda, Poverty, Inc., Muslim League of Welfare Development, Inc., Trade Union of the Philippines, Action Bayan, Inc. and Quezon City Federation of Women Civic Organizations.

=== 1986 coup attempt ===
In early July 1986, Lozano served as spokesman for rebel soldiers led by Arturo Tolentino in attempting a coup against the administration of President Corazon Aquino by occupying the Manila Hotel. The coup attempt occurred five months after President Ferdinand Marcos was overthrown by the People Power Revolution, with Marcos influencing the soldier's actions.

=== July 27 pro-Marcos rally and the death of Stephen Salcedo ===
On July 27, 1986, nearly three weeks after the coup attempt, Lozano and fellow lawyer Benjamin Nuega led an estimated 500 Marcos loyalists in a rally at Rizal Park, where they asked protesters to search the crowd for anti-Marcos infiltrators upon being dispersed by policemen. The resulting chaos from Lozano and Nuega's statement led to the murder of Stephen Salcedo, a supporter of President Corazon Aquino, by rallyists at the park due in part to the yellow shirt he was wearing. Criminal lawsuits Nos. 86-49007 and 86-49008 were filed against Lozano, Nuega and actress Annie Ferrer as accomplices to the murder. On December 16, 1988, the trial court acquitted Lozano for failure of the prosecution to prove his guilt beyond reasonable doubt.

=== Philippine general election, 2004 and 2007 ===
Lozano was the first senatorial candidate to file his certificate of candidacy, under the Kilusang Bagong Lipunan, the ruling party during the Marcos regime. Lozano was later joined by radio announcer and KBL candidate Melchor Chavez. Both Lozano and Chavez lost in previous senatorial derbies. In the 2004 Philippine general election and 2007 Philippine general election, (Independent) Lozano landed on the 36th and 32nd place, with measly 238,272 and 305,637 votes, respectively.

=== Impeachment complaints ===
Lozano filed an impeachment complaint against President Gloria Macapagal Arroyo in June 2005 in connection with the President's supposedly wiretapped conversations with former COMELEC commissioner Virgilio Garcillano. He also filed the 2006, September 2007, February and August 2008 impeachment complaints.

The 2005 Lozano impeachment was defeated principally due to technical deficiency rather than on merit. All the other complaints were dismissed for insufficiency in substance. On October 13, 2008, Lozano, together with his daughter Evangeline Lozano and Elly Pamatong, attempted but failed to file their 4-pages mailed impeachment complaint against President Gloria Macapagal Arroyo, due to tardiness, since the opposition and civil society groups led by Jose de Venecia III, filed ahead of their own 97-page complaint. The House secretariat accepted the Lozano complaint at 10:02 a.m., while the duly verified and endorsed De Venecia complaints, inter alia were received at 7:40 a.m.

=== Dispute over the KBL ===
There has been confusion recently in the 2007 election campaign within the party. This confusion stems from the recent endorsement (allegedly by the KBL) by Lozano of dubious senatorial candidate Joselito Pepito "Peter" Cayetano, who has the namesake of Rep. Alan Peter Cayetano, an opposition stalwart. Rep. Cayetano said that Gov. Bongbong Marcos, who is the president of the KBL, has certified that Joselito Cayetano has no party affiliation whatsoever with the KBL and that no endorsement was called for his namesake's candidacy. More recently, Marcos has denounced Lozano along with his candidates for turning the KBL into an "embarrassment". Marcos said that the party leadership will deal with the "renegade members" of the KBL after the elections. However, Lozano has repeatedly contended on television and radio that Marcos is an "honorary" president, and the real power within the party lies with Vicente Millora, who is the duly noted party chairman.

On his impeachment complaint when asked the reaction of Senator Francis Escudero “He [Escudero] was silent. He did not give me the go signal to file it but implied the fact that he did not also stop me.”

On the reaction of Opposition congressmen to his impeachment complaint “I feel insulted. But in fighting for my principle, I should never involve my personal emotion so I contained my pride, held my anger and gracefully exited. Very impliedly, they [opposition] don't want to talk to me.” -->

=== Later years ===
In March 2017, he criticized the impeachment complaint filed by Magdalo Party-List representative Gary Alejano against president Rodrigo Duterte, denouncing its "gross unfairness and baseless accusations".

== Death ==
On March 22, 2018, Lozano survived a heart attack after undergoing angioplasty. He was discharged from the hospital five days later after showing signs of recovery. However he was hospitalized at the Capitol Medical Center in Quezon City on April 11 due to weak pulse and general weakness. He died early morning of the following day.

== Personal life ==
Lozano was married to Norma Junio.
