= Nina Rasul =

Filipina politician (1930–2024)

The Honorable Santanina T. Rasul
- سَنْتَنِنَ رَسُلْ
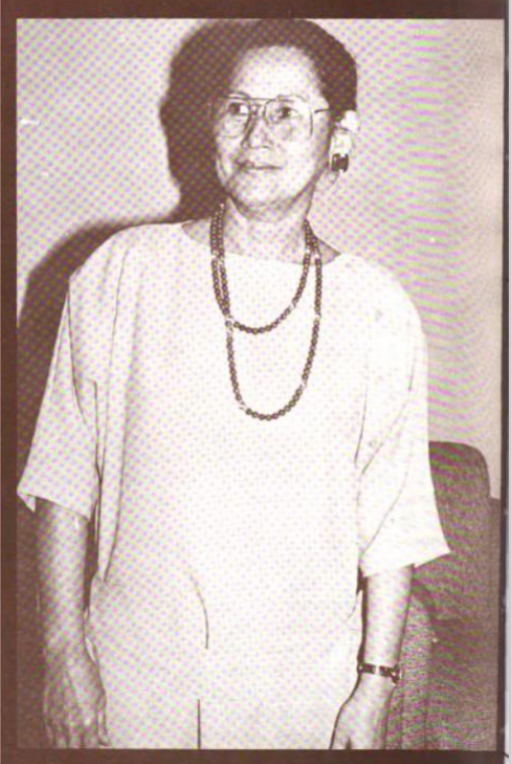
- Tillah-Rasul as a senator, photograph released by the Philippine Congress, c. 1988

Senator of the Philippines
- In office June 30, 1987 – June 30, 1995

Member of the Sulu Provincial Board
- In office 1971–1976

Personal details
- Born: Santanina Centi Tillah; September 14, 1930 Siasi, Sulu, Philippine Islands
- Died: November 28, 2024 (aged 94) Quezon City, Philippines
- Party: Independent (2001–2024)
- Other political affiliations: Lakas (1992–2001); Liberal (until 1992)
- Spouse: Abraham A. Rasul (m. 1953; died 2002)
- Children: 6, including Amina
- Education: University of the Philippines Diliman (BA); National Defense College of the Philippines (MNSA)
- Occupation: Educator, politician

Santanina Tillah Rasul (born Santanina Centi Tillah; September 14, 1930 – November 28, 2024) was a Filipina politician and the first Muslim woman member of the Senate of the Philippines.

== Early life and education ==
Rasul was born in Siasi, Sulu, on September 14, 1930. She attended elementary school in South Ubian, Tawi-Tawi and high school in Jolo, graduating in first place on both occasions. In 1952, Rasul earned a BA in Political Science cum laude from the University of the Philippines, Diliman, in Quezon City. She also obtained a master's degree in National Security Administration from the National Defense College of the Philippines. In 1978, Rasul earned doctoral credits in public administration from the University of the Philippines' College of Public Administration.

== Political career ==
Rasul, together with Senator Leticia Ramos-Shahani, was one of the first women senators in Congress reestablished during the Fifth Republic. Her first experience in government and public service, however, was as a public school teacher in Siasi and Jolo from 1952 to 1957. From 1963 to 1964, she became technical assistant to the Office of the President of the Philippines. She has been an advocate of adult literacy and peace-building for years through her affiliations with various non-government organizations.

The political career of Rasul started when she became a barrio councilor of Moore Avenue, Jolo for two consecutive terms; from 1960 to 1961 and from 1962 to 1963. From 1971 to 1976, she was a provincial board member of the Provincial Board of Sulu. She also served as a Commissioner for Muslim and other ethnic minorities from 1978 to 1987 while being affiliated with the Ministry of Education, Culture, and Sports (renamed the Department of Education, Culture, and Sports during the administration of President Corazon Aquino) as a member of its board.

=== Senate tenure ===
Rasul was elected senator and served for two consecutive terms; from 1987 to 1992 and from 1992 to 1995. As a senator for eight years, Rasul authored, co-authored, and/or sponsored important legislation concerning women's rights, Muslim affairs, family, and gender equality.

An important legislation that she co-authored with Senator Raul Roco was Republic Act No. 7192 or the Women in Development and Nation-Building Act of 1992. The Act outlawed discrimination against women, opened the doors of the Philippine Military Academy to women, and mandated that a substantial portion of government funds at all levels be used for programs that would benefit and develop women's capabilities. She also sponsored Republic Act No. 6949, the law declaring March 8 of every year as National Women's Day in the Philippines. Rasul was also the chairperson of such important Senate committees as Civil Service and Government Recognition, and Women and Family Relations.

Rasul was recognized by the Senate and the Women and Gender Institute of Miriam College for her dedication to her legislative duties and for her tireless effort to pursue gender equality, improve Philippine society, and promote and uphold democracy. She was also designated as Honorary Ambassador of UNESCO during the International Literacy Year in 1990.

== Personal life and death ==
Santanina Rasul was married to former Philippine Ambassador to Saudi Arabia Abraham A. Rasul (1922–2002), a Tausūg. They had six children. Rasul played the gambang.

Rasul died on November 28, 2024, at the age of 94. In a letter sent by Philippine president Bongbong Marcos to Rasul's family in December 2024, he expressed his condolences and praised Rasul for her contribution as a "trailblazer for equality and empowerment".
