= Wigberto Tañada =

Filipino politician (born 1934)

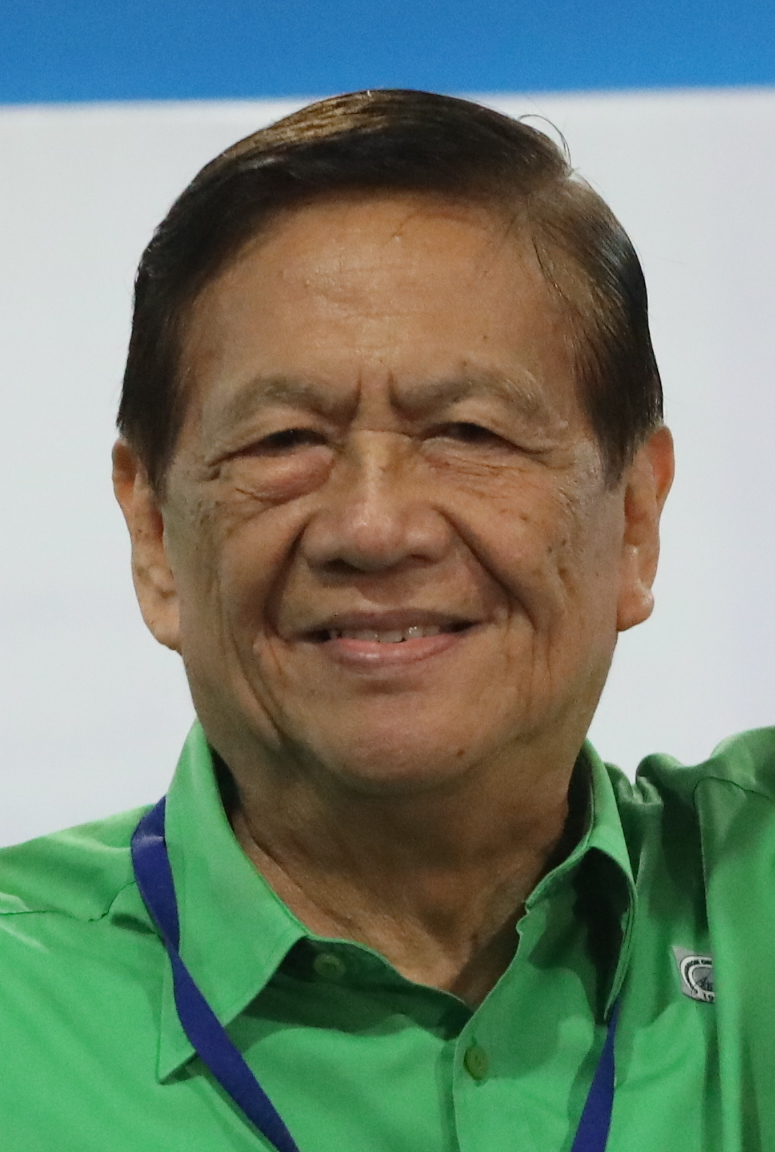
- Tañada in 2018

Senate Minority Leader
- In office January 18, 1992 – June 30, 1995
- Preceded by: Juan Ponce Enrile
- Succeeded by: Edgardo Angara

Senator of the Philippines
- In office June 30, 1987 – June 30, 1995

Member of the House of Representatives from Quezon's 4th district
- In office June 30, 1995 – June 30, 2001
- Preceded by: Manolet O. Lavides
- Succeeded by: Georgilu R. Yumul-Hermida

Chairman of the Bantayog ng mga Bayani Foundation
- In office October 24, 2016 – August 30, 2022
- Succeeded by: Chel Diokno

Commissioner of the Bureau of Customs
- In office 1986–1987
- President: Corazon Aquino
- Preceded by: Ramon J. Farolan
- Succeeded by: Alexander A. Padilla

10th President of the Liberal Party
- In office June 2, 1993 – October 17, 1994
- Preceded by: Jovito Salonga
- Succeeded by: Raul Daza

Personal details
- Born: Wigberto Ebarle Tañada; August 13, 1934 (age 92) Gumaca, Tayabas, Philippine Islands
- Party: Liberal
- Spouse: Azucena Reyes
- Relations: Vicente Tañada (grandfather); Lorenzo Tañada Jr. (brother)
- Children: 4, including Erin
- Parent(s): Lorenzo Tañada; Expedita Ebarle-Tañada
- Education: Ateneo de Manila University (BA); Manuel L. Quezon University (LL.B); Harvard University (LL.M)

Wigberto "Ka Bobby" Ebarle Tañada Sr. (Tagalog: [tɐˈɲada]; born August 13, 1934) is a Filipino politician and lawyer. He is member of the Liberal Party and a former member of the Senate of the Philippines (1987–1995) and Philippine House of Representatives representing the Quezon's 4th District (1995–2001). He is the son of the late former senator Lorenzo M. Tañada, known as the "grand old man of the Philippine politics".

== Early life and career ==
Tañada was one of nine children born to Lorenzo Tañada Sr. and Expedita Ebarle. He studied at Quezon Elementary School from 1942 to 1944. In 1944, he transferred to Gumaca Central School. The next year he moved to St. John's Academy. He finished his elementary and secondary education at Ateneo de Manila University in 1948. He received his Bachelor of Arts at Ateneo de Manila University in 1952. In 1956, he received his Bachelor of Laws degree at Manuel L. Quezon University and passed the bar exams four years later. He received his Master of Laws degree at Harvard Law School. His father taught him to save on money during his studies, while sending "balikbayan" (back home) gifts of San Miguel Beer to his dormitory.

== Political life ==
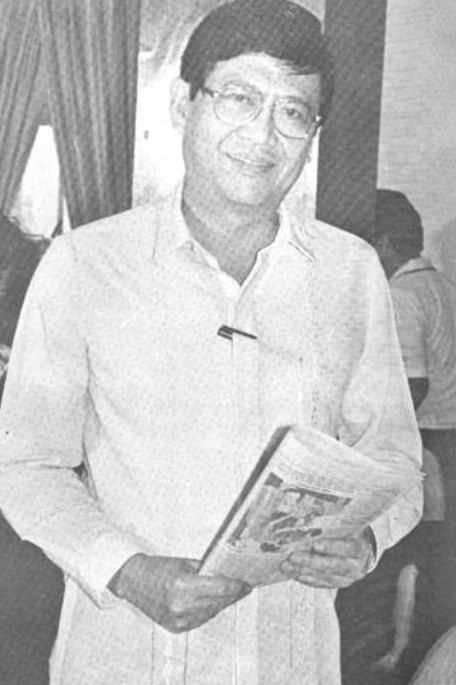
Tañada as a senator, photograph released by the Philippine Congress, c. 1988

In the 1980s, Tañada was a member of the Movement of Attorneys for Brotherhood, Integrity, and Nationalism Inc. (MABINI). In May 1985, Tañada became a member of the newly established Bagong Alyansang Makabayan (Bayan), where he was given the position of vice president for Southern Luzon while his father Lorenzo served as national chairman.

On March 7, 1986, after the People Power Revolution ousted the Marcos family from power, Tañada was appointed Commissioner of the Bureau of Customs by President Corazon Aquino, replacing Brigadier General Ramon Farolan. He ran for senator under the banner of LABAN (Coalition of the Liberal Party, PDP-Laban, NUCD, Bansang Nagkakaisa sa Diwa at Layunin (BANDILA), etc.) and won. In the same year, he became a member of Judicial Bar Council. In 1991, he led the "Magnificent 12", the group of the senators who support the rejection of a new lease for the Subic Bay Naval Base. The next year in 1992, he ran again for senator under the banner of Liberal Party–PDP–Laban alliance, and he was elected for a three-year term, the last remaining Liberal candidate that won in this election. In 1993, he became the president of the Liberal Party. After his tenure as a senator on 1995, he was elected as a member of the Philippine House of Representatives representing the Quezon's 4th District. He was re-elected on 1998. In 2001, he ran again for senator under the banner of Liberal Party (People Power Coalition) but did not win.

Recipient of the 1999 TOFIL Award for government and public service.

== Electoral History ==
1987 - Won Senate

1992 - Won Senate

1995 - Won House

1998 - Won House

2001 - Lost Senate

== See also ==
- Lorenzo M. Tañada
- Lorenzo "Erin" Tañada III
- Gumaca, Quezon

Senate of the Philippines
Preceded by Juan Ponce Enrile	Senate Minority Leader; 1992–1995	Succeeded by Edgardo Angara
House of Representatives of the Philippines
Preceded by Manolet Lavides	Member of the House of Representatives from Quezon's 4th district 1995–2001	Succeeded by Georgilu Yumul-Hermida
