= List of senators of the Philippines in the 13th Congress by seniority =

This is a complete list of senators of the Philippines during the 13th Congress of the Philippines listed by seniority from June 30, 2004, to June 30, 2007.

The criteria for seniority used in this article are derived from the cumulative length of service of a member of the Senate prior to the current Congress. Although an official roster ranking senators by seniority is not publicly available, their total cumulative years of service have been used to determine seniority. It has long been customary, following the practice of the United States Senate, to elect the most senior senator as either president of the Senate or president pro tempore, although this practice has become less common in the modern Senate. Furthermore, seniority is traditionally considered in the selection of chairpersons of major Senate committees.

In cases where senators have equal cumulative service, seniority is determined by the following criteria, in order:

- Longest uninterrupted period of service
- Earlier date on which the cumulative length of service was achieved
- Alphabetical order of surnames

In this Congress, Edgardo Angara was the most senior senator, having previously served 14 years in Senate, while Mar Roxas was the most junior senator.

== List of senators by seniority ==
| Rank | Senator | Party | | Length of previous tenures (Dates of previous tenures) | Notes |
| Rank | Senator | Start of Congress | End of Congress | Length of previous tenures (Dates of previous tenures) | Notes |
|---|---|---|---|---|---|
| 1 | Edgardo Angara | LDP | | 14 years, 0 days (June 30, 1987 – June 30, 1998; June 30, 2001 – June 30, 2004) | |
| 2 | Nene Pimentel | PDP–Laban | | 11 years, 0 days (June 30, 1987 – June 30, 1992; June 30, 1998 – June 30, 2004) | |
| 3 | Juan Ponce Enrile | PMP | | 10 years, 320 days (August 15, 1987 – June 30, 1992; June 30, 1995 – June 30, 2001) | |
| 4 | Rodolfo Biazon | Liberal | | 9 years, 0 days (June 30, 1992 – June 30, 1995, June 30, 1998 – June 30, 2004) | |
| 5 | Franklin Drilon | Liberal | | 9 years, 0 days (June 30, 1995 – June 30, 2004) | Senate president (until July 24, 2006) |
| 6 | Juan Flavier | Lakas | | 9 years, 0 days (June 30, 1995 – June 30, 2004) | Senate president pro tempore |
| 7 | Ramon Magsaysay Jr. | Lakas | Liberal | 9 years, 0 days (June 30, 1995 – June 30, 2004) | |
| 8 | Serge Osmeña | PDP–Laban | | 9 years, 0 days (June 30, 1995 – June 30, 2004) | |
| 9 | Miriam Defensor Santiago | PRP | | 6 years, 0 days (June 30, 1995 – June 30, 2001) | |
| 10 | Joker Arroyo | Independent | KAMPI | 3 years, 0 days (June 30, 2001 – June 30, 2004) | |
| 11 | Loi Ejercito | PMP | | 3 years, 0 days (June 30, 2001 – June 30, 2004) | |
| 12 | Panfilo Lacson | Independent | | 3 years, 0 days (June 30, 2001 – June 30, 2004) | |
| 13 | Kiko Pangilinan | Liberal | | 3 years, 0 days (June 30, 2001 – June 30, 2004) | |
| 14 | Ralph Recto | Nacionalista | Lakas | 3 years, 0 days (June 30, 2001 – June 30, 2004) | |
| 15 | Manny Villar | Nacionalista | | 3 years, 0 days (June 30, 2001 – June 30, 2004) | Senate president (from July 24, 2006) |
| 16 | Pia Cayetano | Lakas | Nacionalista | | |
| 17 | Jinggoy Estrada | PMP | | | |
| 18 | Dick Gordon | Lakas | | | |
| 19 | Lito Lapid | Lakas | | | |
| 20 | Alfredo Lim | PMP | | | Resigned on June 29, 2007, upon taking office as Mayor of Manila. |
| 21 | Jamby Madrigal | LDP | PDP–Laban | | |
| 22 | Bong Revilla | Lakas | | | |
| 23 | Mar Roxas | Liberal | | | |
