= 1998 Philippine Senate election =

26th election of members to the Senate of the Philippines

- May 11, 1998

12 (of the 24) seats in the Senate 13 seats needed for a majority
Alliance	Lakas	LAMMP
Seats won	5	7
Popular vote	93,261,379	91,421,394
Percentage	45.44	44.54
Senate President before election
Neptali Gonzales
LDP
Elected Senate President
Marcelo Fernan
LDP

The 26th election of members to the Senate of the Philippines was held on Monday, May 11, 1998, to elect 12 of the 24 seats in the Senate. The two main competing coalitions in the senatorial election were Lakas—National Union of Christian Democrats—United Muslim Democrats of the Philippines and the Laban ng Makabayang Masang Pilipino umbrella coalition composed of Laban ng Demokratikong Pilipino, Pwersa ng Masang Pilipino, Nationalist People's Coalition, and Partido Demokratiko Pilipino—Lakas ng Bayan. The two coalitions split the 12 contested seats 7–5 in favor of LAMMP.

== Electoral system ==
Philippine Senate elections are via pluraity block voting, with the entire country as an at-large "district". Each voter has 12 votes, and can vote for up to 12 candidates. Seats up were for the 1st to 12th placed candidates in 1992.

== Candidates ==
The two major presidential candidates, House Speaker Jose C. de Venecia Jr. of Lakas—NUCD—UMDP and Vice President Joseph E. Estrada of LAMMP presented full 12-person senatorial slates.

Former National Defense Secretary Renato de Villa's Partido ng Demokratikong Reporma, Santiago Dumlao's Kilusan para sa Pambansang Pagpapanibago, and Manila Mayor Alfredo Lim's Liberal Party also presented senatorial slates.

Oliver Lozano was the sole independent not included in senatorial slates who was allowed to run.

=== Administration coalition ===
Lakas–NUCD–UMDP ticket
Lisandro Abadia	Lakas
Rolando Andaya	Lakas
Robert Barbers	Lakas
Rene Cayetano	Lakas
Roberto De Ocampo	Lakas
Ricardo Gloria	Lakas
Teofisto Guingona Jr.	Lakas
Loren Legarda	Lakas
Roberto Pagdanganan	Lakas
Hernando Perez	Lakas
Nina Rasul	Lakas
Ramon Revilla Sr.	Lakas

=== Primary opposition coalition ===
Laban ng Makabayang Masang Pilipino ticket
Tessie Aquino-Oreta	LDP
Ramon Bagatsing Jr.	LDP
Rodolfo Biazon	LDP
Robert Jaworski	PMP
Edcel Lagman	LDP
Blas Ople	LDP
John Henry Osmeña	LDP
Nene Pimentel	PDP–Laban
Miguel Luis Romero	LDP
Tito Sotto	LDP
Ruben Torres	Independent
Freddie Webb	LDP

=== Other opposition coalitions ===
Partido para sa Demokratikong Reporma–Lapiang Manggagawa ticket
Adolfo Geromino	Reporma–LM
Rey Langit	Reporma–LM
Roberto Sebastian	Reporma–LM
Roy Señeres	Reporma–LM
Hadja Putri Tamano	Reporma–LM
Jose Villegas	Reporma–LM
Haydee Yorac	Reporma–LM
Abraham Iribani	Reporma–LM

Liberal Party ticket
Raul Daza	Liberal
Charito Plaza	Liberal

Kilusan para sa Pambansang Pagbabago ticket
Ludovico Badoy	BAGO
Eduardo Bondoc	BAGO
David Castro	BAGO
Renato Garcia	BAGO
Fred Henry Marallag	BAGO

=== Independents ===
Independent candidates
Oliver Lozano	Independent

== Retiring and term limited incumbents ==
1. Heherson Alvarez (LDP), term limited, ran for representative from Isabela's 4th district and won; ran for senator in 2004 and lost
2. Edgardo Angara (LDP), term limited, ran for Vice President of the Philippines and lost; ran for senator in 2001 and won
3. Neptali Gonzales (LDP), term limited, retired from politics
4. Ernesto Herrera (LDP), term limited, ran for representative from Bohol's 1st district and won; ran for senator in 2001 and in 2004 and lost both times
5. Ernesto Maceda (NPC), term limited, ran for mayor of Manila and lost; ran for senator in 2004 and lost
6. Orlando S. Mercado (LDP), term limited, was subsequently appointed as Secretary of National Defense; ran for senator in 2001 and in 2004 and lost both times
7. Alberto Romulo (LDP), term limited
8. Leticia Ramos-Shahani (Lakas), term limited, retired from politics

=== Incumbents running elsewhere ===
These all won in the 1995 election, and if lost, would have still returned to finish their six-year Senate term.

1. Miriam Defensor Santiago (PRP), ran for President of the Philippines and lost
2. Gloria Macapagal Arroyo (Lakas), ran for Vice President of the Philippines and won
3. Raul Roco (Aksyon), ran for President of the Philippines and lost
4. Francisco Tatad (GAD), ran for Vice President of the Philippines and lost

Arroyo's victory in the vice presidential election meant that she would vacate her Senate seat by June 30, 1998.

== Results ==
The Laban ng Makabayang Masang Pilipino (LAMMP) won seven seats, while the Lakas-NUCD won five.

Three incumbents, all from LAMMP, successfully defended their seats: Blas Ople, Ramon Revilla Sr., and Tito Sotto.

There are five neophyte senators: Rene Cayetano, Loren Legarda, and Robert Barbers of Lakas, and Robert Jaworski and Tessie Aquino-Oreta of LAMMP.

Returning senators are Rodolfo Biazon, John Henry Osmeña, and Aquilino Pimentel Jr. of LAMMP, and Teofisto Guingona, Jr. of Lakas.

Freddie Webb was the sole incumbent defeated.

The election of Gloria Macapagal Arroyo as Vice President of the Philippines in a concurrent election meant that her Senate seat was vacant until June 30, 2001.

	1	2	3	4	5	6	7	8	9	10	11	12	13	14	15	16	17	18	19	20	21	22	23	24
Before election							‡	‡	‡	‡	‡	‡	‡	‡	‡	‡	‡	‡						
Election result	Not up						LAMMP							Lakas coalition					Not up					
After election							*	√	√	√	*	+	+	*	+	+	+	+						^
Senate bloc	Minority bloc		Majority bloc																					

Key:

- ‡ Seats up
- + Gained by a party from another party
- √ Held by the incumbent
- * Held by the same party with a new senator
- ^ Vacancy

=== Per candidate ===
Candidate	Party or alliance		Votes	%
Loren Legarda	Lakas–NUCD–UMDP		14,933,965	50.99
Rene Cayetano	Lakas–NUCD–UMDP		13,177,584	45.00
Tito Sotto	Laban ng Makabayang Masang Pilipino	Laban ng Demokratikong Pilipino	11,520,678	39.34
Nene Pimentel	Laban ng Makabayang Masang Pilipino	PDP–Laban	10,227,765	34.92
Robert Barbers	Lakas–NUCD–UMDP		9,768,045	33.35
Rodolfo Biazon	Laban ng Makabayang Masang Pilipino	Laban ng Demokratikong Pilipino	9,352,964	31.94
Blas Ople	Laban ng Makabayang Masang Pilipino	Laban ng Demokratikong Pilipino	9,278,448	31.68
John Henry Osmeña	Laban ng Makabayang Masang Pilipino	Nationalist People's Coalition	9,242,652	31.56
Robert Jaworski	Laban ng Makabayang Masang Pilipino	Partido ng Masang Pilipino	8,968,616	30.62
Ramon Revilla Sr.	Lakas–NUCD–UMDP		8,683,500	29.65
Teofisto Guingona Jr.	Lakas–NUCD–UMDP		7,325,343	25.01
Tessie Aquino-Oreta	Laban ng Makabayang Masang Pilipino	Laban ng Demokratikong Pilipino	7,238,086	24.72
Roberto Pagdanganan	Lakas–NUCD–UMDP		6,938,178	23.69
Ruben Torres	Laban ng Makabayang Masang Pilipino	Independent	6,923,821	23.64
Edcel Lagman	Laban ng Makabayang Masang Pilipino	Laban ng Demokratikong Pilipino	6,831,441	23.33
Santanina Rasul	Lakas–NUCD–UMDP		6,695,955	22.86
Rolando Andaya Sr.	Lakas–NUCD–UMDP		5,722,871	19.54
Roberto de Ocampo	Lakas–NUCD–UMDP		5,663,401	19.34
Lisandro Abadia	Lakas–NUCD–UMDP		5,426,378	18.53
Haydee Yorac	Partido para sa Demokratikong Reporma–Lapiang Manggagawa		4,618,565	15.77
Ricardo Gloria	Lakas–NUCD–UMDP		4,589,190	15.67
Ramon Bagatsing Jr.	Laban ng Makabayang Masang Pilipino	Laban ng Demokratikong Pilipino	4,540,475	15.50
Freddie Webb	Laban ng Makabayang Masang Pilipino	Laban ng Demokratikong Pilipino	4,514,475	15.42
Hernando Perez	Lakas–NUCD–UMDP		4,336,969	14.81
Rey Langit	Partido para sa Demokratikong Reporma–Lapiang Manggagawa		3,930,085	13.42
Raul Daza	Liberal Party		2,995,851	10.23
Miguel Luis Romero	Laban ng Makabayang Masang Pilipino	Laban ng Demokratikong Pilipino	2,781,973	9.50
Charito Plaza	Liberal Party		2,433,272	8.31
Roy Señeres	Partido para sa Demokratikong Reporma–Lapiang Manggagawa		1,165,455	3.98
Gerry Geronimo	Partido para sa Demokratikong Reporma–Lapiang Manggagawa		871,518	2.98
Hadja Putri Zorayda Tamano	Partido para sa Demokratikong Reporma–Lapiang Manggagawa		855,738	2.92
Roberto Sebastian	Partido para sa Demokratikong Reporma–Lapiang Manggagawa		721,824	2.46
Jose Villegas	Partido para sa Demokratikong Reporma–Lapiang Manggagawa		608,186	2.08
Renato Garcia	Kilusan para sa Pambansang Pagpapanibago		554,818	1.89
David Castro	Kilusan para sa Pambansang Pagpapanibago		436,779	1.49
Ludovico Badoy	Kilusan para sa Pambansang Pagpapanibago		388,465	1.33
Oliver Lozano	Independent		352,037	1.20
Abraham Iribani	Partido para sa Demokratikong Reporma–Lapiang Manggagawa		319,410	1.09
Eduardo Bondoc	Kilusan para sa Pambansang Pagpapanibago		202,217	0.69
Fred Henry Marallag	Kilusan para sa Pambansang Pagpapanibago		106,496	0.36
Total			205,243,489	100.00
Total votes			29,285,775	–
Registered voters/turnout			33,873,665	86.46

=== Per coalition ===
Party or alliance		Votes	%	Seats
Lakas–NUCD–UMDP		93,261,379	45.44	5
Laban ng Makabayang Masang Pilipino	Laban ng Demokratikong Pilipino	56,058,540	27.31	4
Laban ng Makabayang Masang Pilipino	PDP–Laban	10,227,765	4.98	1
Laban ng Makabayang Masang Pilipino	Nationalist People's Coalition	9,242,652	4.50	1
Laban ng Makabayang Masang Pilipino	Partido ng Masang Pilipino	8,968,616	4.37	1
Laban ng Makabayang Masang Pilipino	Independent	6,923,821	3.37	0
Laban ng Makabayang Masang Pilipino	Total	91,421,394	44.54	7
Partido para sa Demokratikong Reporma–Lapiang Manggagawa		13,090,781	6.38	0
Liberal Party		5,429,123	2.65	0
Kilusan para sa Pambansang Pagbabago		1,688,775	0.82	0
Independent		352,037	0.17	0
Total		205,243,489	100.00	12
Total votes		29,285,775	–	
Registered voters/turnout		33,873,665	86.46	

Vote share
Lakas	45.44%
LAMMP	44.54%
Others	10.02%

Senate seats
Lakas	41.67%
LAMMP	58.53%
Others	0.00%

=== Per party ===
Party	Votes	%	+/–	Seats				
Party	Votes	%	+/–	Up	Before	Won	After	+/−
Lakas–NUCD–UMDP	93,261,379	45.44	+21.88	2	7	5	9	+2
Laban ng Demokratikong Pilipino	56,058,540	27.31	−7.41	9	10	4	5	−5
Partido para sa Demokratikong Reporma	13,090,781	6.38	New	0	0	0	0	0
PDP–Laban	10,227,765	4.98	+0.31	0	0	1	1	New
Nationalist People's Coalition	9,242,652	4.50	−11.59	1	2	1	2	0
Partido ng Masang Pilipino	8,968,616	4.37	New	0	0	1	1	New
Liberal Party	5,429,123	2.65	New	0	0	0	0	0
Kilusan para sa Pambansang Pagpapanibago	1,688,775	0.82	New	0	0	0	0	0
Independent	7,275,858	3.54	−1.88	0	2	0	2	0
Aksyon Demokratiko				0	1	0	1	0
Grand Alliance for Democracy/Gabaybayan				0	1	0	1	0
People's Reform Party				0	1	0	1	0
Vacancy				0	0	0	1	+1
Total	205,243,489	100.00	–	12	24	12	24	0
Total votes	25,736,505	–						
Registered voters/turnout	36,415,154	70.68						

Vote share
Lakas	45.44%
LDP	27.31%
Reporma	6.38%
PDP-Laban	4.98%
NPC	4.50%
PMP	4.37%
Independent	3.54%
Others	3.48%

Senate seats won
Lakas	41.67%
LDP	33.33%
Reporma	0.00%
PDP-Laban	8.33%
NPC	8.33%
PMP	8.33%
Independent	0.00%
Others	0.00%

== Defeated incumbents ==
1. Freddie Webb (LDP/LAMMP), ran as House representative from Pasay in 2001 and lost

== See also ==
- Commission on Elections
- Politics of the Philippines
- Philippine elections
- President of the Philippines
- 11th Congress of the Philippines
