= Lakas–Laban Coalition =

Filipino political alliance for 1995 Senate elections

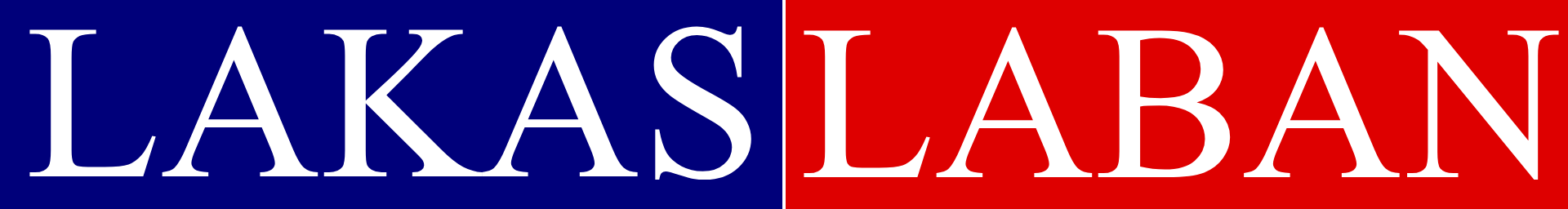
- Leader: Fidel Ramos; Edgardo Angara
- Senate leader: Edgardo Angara
- Founded: 1995
- Dissolved: 1995
- Ideology: Big tent
- Political position: Centre-right
- Coalition members: Lakas; Laban; PDP–Laban
- Colors: Blue, and Red

The Lakas–Laban Coalition was the multi-party electoral alliance supported by the administration of President Fidel V. Ramos for the 1995 Philippine midterm legislative and local elections. It was a coalition of two major parties in the Philippines, the Lakas–NUCD–UMDP of President Ramos, and the Laban ng Demokratikong Pilipino (LDP, then known as Laban) led by Senate President Edgardo "Ed" Angara.

== History ==
In December 1994, Lakas and Laban forged a coalition, but before that many Laban House members jumped to Lakas which led by then-House Speaker Jose "Joe" de Venecia. De Venecia is noted for building the Rainbow Coalition, which is formed by the both parties, while Angara led the Laban-majority Senate as its president. The two formally coalesced a partnership coalition, combining their common names Lakas–Laban. The slate is composed of some incumbent senators who are placed from 13th to 24th (who won in 1992 and can only serve half of a regular term) like Raul Roco and Gloria Macapagal Arroyo in the Laban side, while adding newbies like Health Secretary Dr. Juan Flavier, Justice Secretary Franklin Drilon, and businessman Serge Osmeña, and the addition of Nene Pimentel from Laban's predecessor Partido Demokratiko Pilipino–Lakas ng Bayan. But the negotiations of the coalition forming doesn't seen easy as first, as in the two camps expected that the coalition will not be materialized or easily break-up. Angara said that he has agreement to settle issues with de Venecia. Notably, Ramos bragged that their rival coalition party, the Nationalist People's Coalition (NPC) led by Senator Ernesto Maceda are willing to concede days before election to the coalition. After winning nine Senate seats in total, and 25 House seats under the banner, Lakas–Laban are falling out due to some of the coalition nominees' complaint of lack of support, on both financial or logistical from the machinery of the coalition, with some of them willing to bolt for the opposition. Some blame President Ramos, as they cited his broken promises, and Angara was warned that a post-election shake-up is inevitable, while many Ramos loyalist tagged de Venecia as power grabber, who they think has presidential ambition in the next presidential elections, and will probably get Ramos' backing. Also, local candidates backed by the coalition who are facing defeat, promised funds by their national bosses, but nothing received from them, and forced to find funding from other sources, and some of them leaned to opposition.

== Controversy ==
=== "Dagdag–Bawas" scam ===
With the vote counting happened in May 11, one of the Lakas–Laban candidates Senator Nene Pimentel stated that there are alleged senatorial candidates outside the unfinished tally's top twelve spots were beginning to rig votes by bribing people involved in the electoral process that time. He also said that two of candidates in Lakas–Laban revealed to him that a vote-buying scam called "Oplan Dagdag–Bawas" (lit. 'Add–Subtract') was occurring in Mindanao, where canvassers are bribed to shave off votes meant for Pimentel and transfer them to other candidates. Unfortunately, he admitted that he lacks evidence for that claim, while a Comelec Commissioner dismissed the allegation as false.

By late 1995, the Senate Electoral Tribunal ordered to deduct more than 58,000 "unlawfully credited" votes for Juan Ponce Enrile in Bataan and Isabela from his tally, alongside 7,000 votes for Ramon Mitra Jr.. By mid-1996, the Comelec Commissioner who dismissed the allegation, reversed his stance from the previous year and found that Comelec found evidence of widespread cheating during the election counting. An executive director of Comelec later stated that the most recent election was the first time "dagdag-bawas" was committed on a massive scale. Also, Senator Serge Osmeña discovered that there is 30,000 votes discrepancy for him in Pasig between the manual tally done by the Treasurer's Office and the certificates of canvass. By the end of 1996, Bataan RTC ordered the arrest of Cenon Uy, an assistant regional director for Comelec in Central Luzon, for having allegedly tampered with election results in the region to favor the candidacy of Enrile, though he would remain in office until late 2000 when a pending court case against him forced his resignation.

On February 10, 2000, Antonio Llorente and Ligaya Salayon, who were respectively Pasig City prosecutor and member of the Pasig board of canvassers at the time of the election, was charged by the Supreme Court for violating election laws after they admitted their "honest mistake" of taking away votes from Pimentel and transferring them to Enrile. Llorente eventually went on indefinite leave from his position as Justice Undersecretary in September due to the Supreme Court standing by its ruling. On September 11, 2000, Arsenia Garcia, who was chair of the Alaminos, Pangasinan municipal canvassers during the election, was convicted of electoral fraud by a Regional Trial Court in Alaminos due to her discarding more than 5,000 votes that were in favor of Pimentel, and sentenced to six years in prison.

== Senatorial Slate ==
Candidate	Party	Occupation	Elected
Gloria Macapagal Arroyo	Laban	Senator	Yes
Rodolfo Biazon	Laban	former Chief of Staff of the Armed Forces of the Philippines	No
Franklin Drilon	Lakas	Secretary of Justice	Yes
Juan Ponce Enrile	Independent	Senator	Yes
Marcelo Fernan	Laban	former Chief Justice of the Supreme Court of the Philippines	Yes
Juan Flavier	Lakas	former Secretary of Health	Yes
Ramon Magsaysay Jr.	Lakas	businessman	Yes
Ramon Mitra Jr.	Laban	former congressman from Palawan, former Speaker of the House of Representatives and 1992 Laban Presidential nominee (lost to Fidel Ramos)	No
Serge Osmeña	Lakas	businessman and grandson of former President Sergio Osmeña	Yes
Aquilino Pimentel Jr.	PDP–Laban	former Secretary of the Interior and Local Government and former mayor of Cagayan de Oro	No
Raul Roco	Laban	Senator	Yes
Francisco Tatad	Laban	Senator	Yes

== Results ==
=== Legislative elections ===
Congress of the Philippines
House of Representatives			Senate		
Year	Seats won	Result	Year	Seats won	Result
1995 (Note: Only who stood under the banner)	25 / 204	Lakas plurarity	1995	9 / 12	Lakas–Laban win 9/12 seats

Nine out of 12 candidates won the possible 12 seats in the Senate. These include, in order of votes received:

- Gloria Macapagal Arroyo
- Franklin Drilon
- Juan Ponce Enrile
- Marcelo Fernan
- Juan Flavier
- Ramon Magsaysay Jr.
- Serge Osmeña
- Raul Roco
- Francisco Tatad

== See also ==
- Nationalist People's Coalition, Lakas–Laban Coalition's rival coalition in the 1995 midterm elections.
- Rainbow Coalition (Philippines), their House of Representatives counterpart
