= 1995 Philippine general election =

- May 8, 1995
- Registered: 36,415,154
- Turnout: 25,736,505
- 1995 Philippine Senate election
- May 8, 1995

12 (of the 24) seats in the Senate 13 seats needed for a majority
Alliance	LABAN	NPC
Seats won	9	3
Popular vote	123,660,355	56,015,645
Percentage	67.71	30.67
Senate President before election
Edgardo Angara
Laban
Elected Senate President
Edgardo Angara
Laban
- 1995 Philippine House of Representatives elections
- May 8, 1995
- 204 (of the 226) seats in the House of Representatives; 114 seats needed for a majority
Party	Vote %	Seats	+/–
Lakas	40.66	100	+59
NPC	12.19	22	−8
LDP	10.83	17	−69
LABAN	10.40	25	+25
Others	13.72	33	+20
This lists parties that won seats. See the complete results below.
Speaker before	Speaker after
Jose de Venecia Jr. Lakas	Jose de Venecia Jr. Lakas

The 1995 Philippine general election was held on May 8, 1995.

The Philippine National Police (PNP) listed five people dead and more than 200 hotspots before and 300 hotspots during the election.

== Major senatorial candidates ==
=== Lakas–Laban Coalition ===
Lakas–Laban
For Senators
Gloria Macapagal Arroyo	Laban
Rodolfo Biazon	Laban
Franklin Drilon	Lakas
Juan Ponce Enrile	Nacionalista
Marcelo Fernan	Laban
Juan Flavier	Lakas
Ramon Magsaysay, Jr.	Lakas
Ramon Mitra, Jr.	Laban
Sergio Osmeña III	Lakas
Aquilino Pimentel, Jr.	PDP–Laban
Raul Roco	Laban
Francisco Tatad	Laban

=== Nationalist People's Coalition ===
NPC
For Senators
Rosemarie Arenas	NPC
Gaudencio Beduya	NPC
Nikki Coseteng	NPC
Amanda Cruz	NPC
Ramon Fernandez	NPC
Gringo Honasan	Independent
Bongbong Marcos	KBL
Adelisa Raymundo	NPC
Manuel C. Roxas	NPC
Miriam Defensor Santiago	PRP
Almarin C. Tillah	NPC
Arturo Tolentino	NPC

== Results ==
=== Senate ===
Representation of results; seats contested are inside the box. LDP / Laban Lakas–NUCD–UMDP NPC PRP Nacionalista Party Independent

Candidate	Party or alliance		Votes	%
Gloria Macapagal Arroyo	Lakas–Laban Coalition	Laban ng Demokratikong Pilipino	15,745,741	61.18
Raul Roco	Lakas–Laban Coalition	Laban ng Demokratikong Pilipino	12,509,736	48.61
Ramon Magsaysay Jr.	Lakas–Laban Coalition	Lakas–NUCD	11,862,458	46.09
Franklin Drilon	Lakas–Laban Coalition	Lakas–NUCD	11,032,476	42.87
Juan Flavier	Lakas–Laban Coalition	Lakas–NUCD	10,748,528	41.76
Miriam Defensor Santiago	Nationalist People's Coalition	People's Reform Party	9,497,231	36.90
Serge Osmeña	Lakas–Laban Coalition	Lakas–NUCD	9,390,935	36.49
Francisco Tatad	Lakas–Laban Coalition	Laban ng Demokratikong Pilipino	9,146,951	35.54
Gregorio Honasan	Nationalist People's Coalition	Independent	8,968,616	34.85
Marcelo Fernan	Lakas–Laban Coalition	Laban ng Demokratikong Pilipino	8,762,235	34.05
Juan Ponce Enrile	Lakas–Laban Coalition	Independent	8,701,191	33.81
Nikki Coseteng	Nationalist People's Coalition		8,700,278	33.81
Ramon Mitra Jr.	Lakas–Laban Coalition	Laban ng Demokratikong Pilipino	8,650,618	33.61
Rodolfo Biazon	Lakas–Laban Coalition	Laban ng Demokratikong Pilipino	8,587,338	33.37
Nene Pimentel	Lakas–Laban Coalition	PDP–Laban	8,522,148	33.11
Bongbong Marcos	Nationalist People's Coalition	Kilusang Bagong Lipunan	8,168,768	31.74
Arturo Tolentino	Nationalist People's Coalition		7,726,006	30.02
Ramon Fernandez	Nationalist People's Coalition		3,572,604	13.88
Rose Marie Arenas	Nationalist People's Coalition		3,178,837	12.35
Manuel C. Roxas	Nationalist People's Coalition		2,455,764	9.54
Herman T. Laurel	People's Reform Party		1,395,015	5.42
Almarin C. Tillah	Nationalist People's Coalition		1,165,164	4.53
Amanda T. Cruz	Nationalist People's Coalition		1,008,180	3.92
Gaudencio Beduya	Nationalist People's Coalition		829,082	3.22
Adelisa Raymundo	Nationalist People's Coalition		745,115	2.90
Ibrahim Amerel	Partido Demokratiko Sosyalista ng Pilipinas		482,328	1.87
Vicente N. Biego	Bicol Saro		417,901	1.62
Felino C. Polintan Jr.	Partido Nacionalista ng Pilipinas		393,712	1.53
Brigido Simon (Note: Withdrew but remained on the ballot)	People's Reform Party		152,161	0.59
Jose Misa	Bicol Saro		109,711	0.43
Total			182,626,828	100.00
Total votes			25,736,505	–
Registered voters/turnout			36,415,154	70.68

=== House of Representatives ===
Party	Votes	%	+/–	Seats	+/–
Lakas–NUCD–UMDP	7,811,625	40.66	+19.46	100	+59
Nationalist People's Coalition	2,342,378	12.19	−6.47	22	−8
Laban ng Demokratikong Pilipino	2,079,611	10.83	−22.90	17	−69
Lakas–Laban Coalition	1,998,810	10.40	New	25	New
Lakas–NUCD–UMDP/Liberal Party	437,080	2.28	New	5	New
Liberal Party	358,245	1.86	New	5	New
Lakas ng Bayan/Lakas–NUCD–UMDP/Nationalist People's Coalition	257,821	1.34	New	3	New
Lakas–NUCD–UMDP/Nationalist People's Coalition	195,532	1.02	New	4	New
Lakas ng Bayan/Nationalist People's Coalition	187,705	0.98	New	2	New
Nationalist People's Coalition/Kilusang Bagong Lipunan	183,256	0.95	New	1	New
People's Reform Party	171,454	0.89	New	0	0
Nacionalista Party	153,088	0.80	−3.12	1	−6
Lakas–NUCD–UMDP (independent)	139,427	0.73	New	0	0
PDP–Laban	130,695	0.68	New	1	Mew
Lakas ng Bayan/Liberal Party	106,387	0.55	New	2	New
Lapiang Manggagawa	104,407	0.54	New	0	0
Partido ng Masang Pilipino	101,624	0.53	New	1	New
Nationalist People's Coalition/Partido ng Masang Pilipino	100,879	0.53	New	1	New
Nationalist People's Coalition/PDP–Laban/People's Reform Party	87,241	0.45	New	1	New
Nationalist People's Coalition/Partido ng Masang Pilipino/Kilusang Bagong Lipunan	75,957	0.40	New	0	0
Lakas ng Bayan/Lakas–NUCD–UMDP/Partido ng Masang Pilipino	71,804	0.37	New	1	New
Lakas ng Bayan/Nationalist People's Coalition/Partido ng Masang Pilipino	71,692	0.37	New	0	0
Lakas–NUCD–UMDP/Nacionalista Party	68,542	0.36	New	0	0
Lakas ng Bayan/People's Reform Party	66,176	0.34	New	1	New
Lakas ng Bayan/Nacionalista Party	65,970	0.34	New	1	New
Nationalist People's Coalition/Liberal Party	62,338	0.32	New	0	0
Lakas–NUCD–UMDP/Lakas ng Bayan/Liberal Party	55,991	0.29	New	0	0
Lakas ng Bayan/PDP–Laban	54,508	0.28	New	1	New
Nationalist People's Coalition/Nacionalista Party	54,153	0.28	New	0	0
PDP–Laban/Partido ng Masang Pilipino/People's Reform Party	51,752	0.27	New	1	New
Lakas–NUCD–UMDP/Lakas ng Bayan/Nacionalista Party	43,589	0.23	New	0	0
Lakas–NUCD–UMDP/PDP–Laban	32,417	0.17	New	1	New
PDP–Laban/Nacionalista Party	24,076	0.13	New	0	0
Lakas–NUCD–UMDP/Lapiang Manggagawa	15,726	0.08	New	0	0
Lakas–NUCD–UMDP/Partido Panaghiusa	15,631	0.08	New	0	0
Lakas ng Bayan (independent)	8,366	0.04	New	0	0
Partido Demokratiko Sosyalista ng Pilipinas	7,563	0.04	New	0	0
Nationalist People's Coalition/People's Reform Party	6,523	0.03	New	0	0
People's Reform Party/Nacionalista Party	6,214	0.03	New	0	0
Lakas ng Bayan/Lapiang Manggagawa	3,814	0.02	New	0	0
Partido Nacionalista ng Pilipinas	123	0.00	New	0	0
Unidentified	162,752	0.85	New	0	0
Independent	1,238,214	6.45	+1.41	7	+1
Appointed seats				16	0
Total	19,211,156	100.00	–	220	+4
Valid votes	19,211,156	74.65			
Invalid/blank votes	6,525,349	25.35			
Total votes	25,736,505	100.00			
Registered voters/turnout	36,415,154	70.68			

=== Local elections ===
Local elections for all positions above the barangay level, but below the regional level, were held on this day.

==== Gubernatorial elections ====
The following are the gubernatorial election results by party:

Party	Seats
Lakas–NUCD–UMDP	50
Laban ng Demokratikong Pilipino	11
Nationalist People's Coalition	10
Liberal Party	2
Independent Nacionalistas and Allies	1
Padayon Pilipino	1
PDP–Laban	1
Total	76
Source: Commission on Elections

The following are the gubernatorial election results by party:

Province	Elected governor	Party
Abra	Vicente Valera	Lakas
Agusan del Norte	Angelica Amante	Lakas
Agusan del Sur	Democrito Plaza	LDP
Aklan	Florencio Miraflores	LDP
Albay	Al Francis Bichara	Lakas
Antique	Jovito Plameras Jr.	Lakas
Aurora	Edgardo Ong	Lakas
Basilan	Gerry Salapuddin	LDP
Bataan	Leonardo Roman	Lakas
Batanes	Telesforo Castillejos	Lakas
Batangas	Hermilando Mandanas	LDP
Benguet	Raul Molintas	NPC
Biliran	Wayne Jaro	Lakas
Bohol	Rene Relampagos	Lakas
Bukidnon	Carlos Fortich	Lakas
Bulacan	Roberto Pagdanganan	Lakas
Cagayan	Rodolfo Aguinaldo	Lakas
Camarines Norte	Roy Padilla Jr.	NPC
Camarines Sur	Luis Villafuerte	LDP
Camiguin	Antonio Gallardo	Lakas
Capiz	Esteban Evan Contreras	Lakas
Catanduanes	Severo Alcantara	Lakas
Cavite	Epimaco Velasco	Liberal
Cebu	Pablo P. Garcia	Lakas
Cotabato	Rosario Diaz	Lakas
Davao del Norte	Prospero Amatong	Lakas
Davao del Sur	Rogelio Llanos	Lakas
Davao Oriental	Rosalind Lopez	Lakas
Eastern Samar	Lutgardo Barbo	Lakas
Guimaras	Imelda Lopez	Lakas
Ifugao	Ildefonso Dulinayan	LDP
Ilocos Norte	Rodolfo Fariñas	Lakas
Ilocos Sur	Chavit Singson	LDP
Iloilo	Arthur Defensor Sr.	Lakas
Isabela	Benjamin Dy	NPC
Kalinga-Apayao	Lawrence Wacnang	Lakas
La Union	Justo Orros Jr.	Lakas
Laguna	Joey Lina	LDP
Lanao del Norte	Abdullah Dimaporo	Lakas
Lanao del Sur	Mahid Mutilan	NPC
Leyte	Remedios Petilla	LDP
Maguindanao	Zacaria Candao	LDP
Marinduque	Jose Antonio Carrion	NPC
Masbate	Emilio Espinosa Jr.	INA
Misamis Occidental	Florencio Garcia	NPC
Misamis Oriental	Vicente Emano	Padayon Pilipino
Mountain Province	Maximo Dalog	Lakas
Negros Occidental	Rafael Cosculluela	Lakas
Negros Oriental	Emilio Macias	Lakas
Northern Samar	Harlin Abayon	Liberal
Nueva Ecija	Eduardo Nonato Joson	NPC
Nueva Vizcaya	Rodolfo Agbayani	Lakas
Occidental Mindoro	Josephine Sato	Lakas
Oriental Mindoro	Rodolfo Valencia	Lakas
Palawan	Salvador Socrates	Lakas
Pampanga	Lito Lapid	NPC
Pangasinan	Oscar Orbos	Lakas
Quezon	Eduardo Rodriguez	Lakas
Quirino	Josie Co	Lakas
Rizal	Casimiro Ynares Jr.	NPC
Romblon	Jose Madrid	Lakas
Samar	Jose Roño	Lakas
Sarangani	Priscilla Chiongbian	Lakas
Siquijor	Lucito Balanay	Lakas
Sorsogon	Juan Frivaldo	PDP–Laban
South Cotabato	Hilario de Pedro III	Lakas
Southern Leyte	Oscar Tan	Lakas
Sultan Kudarat	Nesthur Gumana	Lakas
Sulu	Abdusakur Mahail Tan	Lakas
Surigao del Norte	Francisco Matugas	Lakas
Surigao del Sur	Primo Murillo	Lakas
Tarlac	Tingting Cojuangco	LDP
Tawi-Tawi	Hadjaril Matba	Lakas
Zambales	Amor Deloso	Lakas
Zamboanga del Norte	Roldan Dalman	NPC
Zamboanga del Sur	Isidoro Real Jr.	Lakas
Source: Commission on Elections

==== Vice gubernatorial elections ====
The following are the vice gubernatorial election results by party:

Party	Seats
Lakas–NUCD–UMDP	45
Laban ng Demokratikong Pilipino	13
Nationalist People's Coalition	8
Liberal Party	4
Kilusang Bagong Lipunan	1
People's Reform Party	1
Independent	3
Vacant	1
Total	76
Source: Commission on Elections

The following are the vice gubernatorial election results by party:

Province	Elected vice governor	Party
Abra	Constante Culangen	Lakas
Agusan del Norte	Roberto Tejano	Lakas
Agusan del Sur	Alex Bascug	LDP
Aklan	Jean Rodriguez	LDP
Albay	Danilo Azaña	NPC
Antique	Robin Rubinos	Lakas
Aurora	Agapito Samano Jr.	LDP
Basilan	Ping Kasim	Lakas
Bataan	Serafin Roman	Lakas
Batanes	Elena Alcantara	Lakas
Batangas	Ricky Recto	Lakas
Benguet	Wasing Sacla	Independent
Biliran	Danilo Parilla	PRP
Bohol	Edgar Chatto	LDP
Bukidnon	Nemesio Beltran	Lakas
Bulacan	Josefina dela Cruz	Lakas
Cagayan	Florencio Vargas	Lakas
Camarines Norte	Alexis Pardo	LDP
Camarines Sur	Salvio Fortuno	LDP
Camiguin	Nicolas Neri	Independent
Capiz	Luisito Escutin	Lakas
Catanduanes	Teofisto Verceles	Lakas
Cavite	Bong Revilla	Liberal
Cebu	Apolonio Abines Jr.	Lakas
Cotabato	Wilfredo Jalipa	Lakas
Davao del Norte	Pedro San Jose	Lakas
Davao del Sur	Antonio Sunga	Lakas
Davao Oriental	Capistrano Roflo	Lakas
Eastern Samar	German Alido	Lakas
Guimaras	Edgar Espinosa	Lakas
Ifugao	Juan Dacawe	LDP
Ilocos Norte	Mariano Nalupta Jr.	KBL
Ilocos Sur	Deogracias Victor Savellano	LDP
Iloilo	Demetrio Sonza	Lakas
Isabela	Edwin Uy	Lakas
Kalinga-Apayao	Jocel Baac	Lakas
La Union	Amparo Aspiras	Lakas
Laguna	Teresita Lazaro	LDP
Lanao del Norte	Timoteo Dacalos	Lakas
Lanao del Sur	Normala Lucman	Lakas
Leyte	Edgar Veloso	LDP
Maguindanao	Midpantao Midtimbang	LDP
Marinduque	Teodorito Rejano	Lakas
Masbate	Ricardo Celera	Liberal
Misamis Occidental	Jesus Sanciangco	Lakas
Misamis Oriental	Danilo Lagbas	Lakas
Mountain Province	Leonard Mayaen	Lakas
Negros Occidental	Romeo Gamboa Jr.	Lakas
Negros Oriental	George Arnaiz	Lakas
Northern Samar	Bayani Dato	Liberal
Nueva Ecija	Oscar Tinio	NPC
Nueva Vizcaya	Natalia Dumlao	NPC
Occidental Mindoro	Anita Villaroza	NPC
Oriental Mindoro	Bartolome Marasigan	NPC
Palawan	Mario Joel Reyes	LDP
Pampanga	Cielo Salgado	NPC
Pangasinan	Victor Agbayani	Lakas
Quezon	Roberto Racelis	Lakas
Quirino	Bonifacio Cristobal	Lakas
Rizal	Nicandro Natividad	Liberal
Romblon	Jose Cesar Fonte	Lakas
Samar	Ernesto Arcales	Lakas
Sarangani	Miguel Escobar	Lakas
Siquijor	Elpedio Arcamo	Lakas
Sorsogon	Oscar Deri	LDP
South Cotabato	Ludwig Morales	NPC
Southern Leyte	Eva Tomol	NPC
Sultan Kudarat	Rosila Jamison	Lakas
Sulu	Hadji Munib Estino	Lakas
Surigao del Norte	Regina Barbers	Lakas
Surigao del Sur	Johnny Pimentel	Lakas
Tarlac	No winner	
Tawi-Tawi	Mohammad Abubakar	Lakas
Zambales	Saturnino Bactad	Lakas
Zamboanga del Norte	Concordio Adriatico	Independent
Zamboanga del Sur	Romeo Vera Cruz	Lakas
Source: Commission on Elections

==== Provincial board elections ====
The following are the provincial board election results by party:

Party	Seats
Lakas–NUCD–UMDP	405
Laban ng Demokratikong Pilipino	101
Nationalist People's Coalition	78
Liberal Party	33
Independent Nacionalistas and Allies	4
Kilusang Bagong Lipunan	4
Padayon Pilipino	3
Partido ng Masang Pilipino	3
Nacionalista Party	2
Nationalist People's Coalition/Lakas–NUCD–UMDP	2
People's Reform Party	2
PDP–Laban	1
No party	2
Independents	33
No data	1
Total	674
Source: Commission on Elections

The following are the provincial board election results by province:

Province	Elected seats	Party	Seats won
Abra	8	Lakas	7
Abra	8	Independent	1
Agusan del Norte	8	Lakas	8
Agusan del Sur	10	LDP	7
Agusan del Sur	10	Lakas	3
Aklan	8	LDP	7
Aklan	8	Liberal	1
Albay	10	Lakas	7
Albay	10	NPC	2
Albay	10	LDP	1
Antique	8	Lakas	6
Antique	8	LDP	1
Antique	8	PRP	1
Aurora	8	Lakas	6
Aurora	8	NPC	1
Aurora	8	PRP	1
Basilan	6	Lakas	3
Basilan	6	LDP	3
Bataan	10	Lakas	6
Bataan	10	NPC	4
Batanes	6	Lakas	3
Batanes	6	Liberal	3
Batangas	10	Lakas	6
Batangas	10	LDP	2
Batangas	10	Nacionalista	1
Batangas	10	Independent	1
Benguet	10	Lakas	5
Benguet	10	LDP	3
Benguet	10	NPC	1
Benguet	10	Independent	1
Biliran	6	Lakas	4
Biliran	6	NPC	2
Bohol	10	LDP	6
Bohol	10	Lakas	4
Bukidnon	10	Lakas	9
Bukidnon	10	Liberal	1
Bulacan	10	Lakas	9
Bulacan	10	NPC	1
Cagayan	10	Lakas	6
Cagayan	10	Liberal	1
Cagayan	10	LDP	1
Cagayan	10	NPC	1
Cagayan	10	Independent	1
Camarines Norte	8	LDP	4
Camarines Norte	8	NPC	3
Camarines Norte	8	Lakas	1
Camarines Sur	10	Lakas	7
Camarines Sur	10	LDP	2
Camarines Sur	10	NPC	1
Camiguin	6	Lakas	4
Camiguin	6	NPC/Lakas	2
Capiz	10	Liberal	5
Capiz	10	Lakas	4
Capiz	10	Independent	1
Catanduanes	6	Lakas	2
Catanduanes	6	Liberal	1
Catanduanes	6	LDP	1
Catanduanes	6	NPC	1
Catanduanes	6	Independent	1
Cavite	10	LDP	10
Cebu	10	Lakas	9
Cebu	10	LDP	1
Cotabato	10	Lakas	8
Cotabato	10	NPC	2
Davao del Norte	10	Lakas	8
Davao del Norte	10	PDP–Laban	1
Davao del Norte	10	PMP	1
Davao del Sur	10	Lakas	5
Davao del Sur	10	NPC	5
Davao Oriental	8	Lakas	6
Davao Oriental	8	LDP	2
Eastern Samar	8	Lakas	7
Eastern Samar	8	LDP	1
Guimaras	6	Lakas	5
Guimaras	6	Independent	1
Ifugao	6	LDP	3
Ifugao	6	NPC	3
Ilocos Norte	10	LDP	4
Ilocos Norte	10	KBL	2
Ilocos Norte	10	Independent	4
Ilocos Sur	10	LDP	6
Ilocos Sur	10	Lakas	1
Ilocos Sur	10	NPC	1
Ilocos Sur	10	Independent	2
Iloilo	10	Lakas	10
Isabela	10	Lakas	5
Isabela	10	NPC	5
Kalinga-Apayao	8	Lakas	4
Kalinga-Apayao	8	Liberal	1
Kalinga-Apayao	8	NPC	1
Kalinga-Apayao	8	Independent	2
La Union	10	Lakas	10
Laguna	10	Lakas	7
Laguna	10	LDP	3
Lanao del Norte	8	Lakas	8
Lanao del Sur	8	Lakas	5
Lanao del Sur	8	Independent	2
Lanao del Sur	8	No data	1
Leyte	10	Lakas	7
Leyte	10	KBL	1
Leyte	10	LDP	1
Leyte	10	Liberal	1
Maguindanao	10	Lakas	5
Maguindanao	10	LDP	4
Maguindanao	10	No party	1
Marinduque	8	Lakas	4
Marinduque	8	Independent	4
Masbate	10	INA	4
Masbate	10	Lakas	4
Masbate	10	LDP	2
Misamis Occidental	8	Lakas	7
Misamis Occidental	8	NPC	1
Misamis Oriental	10	Lakas	7
Misamis Oriental	10	Padayon	3
Mountain Province	6	Lakas	4
Mountain Province	6	Independent	2
Negros Occidental	10	Lakas	6
Negros Occidental	10	NPC	3
Negros Occidental	10	Independent	1
Negros Oriental	10	Lakas	6
Negros Oriental	10	LDP	4
Northern Samar	10	Liberal	9
Northern Samar	10	Lakas	1
Nueva Ecija	10	Lakas	5
Nueva Ecija	10	NPC	5
Nueva Vizcaya	8	Lakas	5
Nueva Vizcaya	8	NPC	1
Nueva Vizcaya	8	Independent	2
Occidental Mindoro	8	Lakas	6
Occidental Mindoro	8	LDP	2
Oriental Mindoro	10	NPC	4
Oriental Mindoro	10	Lakas	3
Oriental Mindoro	10	Liberal	3
Palawan	10	Lakas	7
Palawan	10	Independent	3
Pampanga	10	Lakas	6
Pampanga	10	NPC	4
Pangasinan	10	Lakas	6
Pangasinan	10	NPC	2
Pangasinan	10	KBL	1
Pangasinan	10	LDP	1
Quezon	10	Lakas	6
Quezon	10	LDP	2
Quezon	10	Liberal	1
Quezon	10	Independent	1
Quirino	6	Lakas	3
Quirino	6	LDP	1
Quirino	6	NPC	1
Quirino	6	Independent	1
Rizal	10	NPC	6
Rizal	10	Lakas	2
Rizal	10	Liberal	2
Romblon	6	Lakas	6
Samar	10	Lakas	5
Samar	10	Liberal	3
Samar	10	Nacionalista	1
Samar	10	No party	1
Sarangani	8	Lakas	6
Sarangani	8	NPC	1
Sarangani	8	Independent	1
Siquijor	6	Lakas	6
Sorsogon	10	LDP	5
Sorsogon	10	Lakas	4
Sorsogon	10	Liberal	1
South Cotabato	10	Lakas	5
South Cotabato	10	NPC	5
Southern Leyte	8	Lakas	6
Southern Leyte	8	NPC	2
Sultan Kudarat	10	Lakas	9
Sultan Kudarat	10	LDP	1
Sulu	8	Lakas	8
Surigao del Norte	8	Lakas	5
Surigao del Norte	8	NPC	3
Surigao del Sur	10	Lakas	10
Tarlac	10	LDP	5
Tarlac	10	Lakas	3
Tarlac	10	NPC	2
Tawi-Tawi	6	Lakas	6
Zambales	10	Lakas	4
Zambales	10	LDP	3
Zambales	10	PMP	2
Zambales	10	Independent	1
Zamboanga del Norte	10	Lakas	9
Zamboanga del Norte	10	NPC	1
Zamboanga del Sur	10	Lakas	5
Zamboanga del Sur	10	NPC	3
Zamboanga del Sur	10	LDP	2
Source: Commission on Elections

==== Local plebiscites ====
Local plebiscites were also held on this day:

Location	Purpose	Result
Kalinga-Apayao	Division of the province to create Apayao and Kalinga	Approved
Jordan and Nueva Valencia, Guimaras	Creation of Sibunag	Approved
Jordan and Buenavista, Guimaras	Creation of San Lorenzo	Approved
Muntinlupa	Cityhood of Muntinlupa	Approved

== See also ==
- Commission on Elections
- Politics of the Philippines
- Philippine elections
- 10th Congress of the Philippines
