= 1995 Philippine Senate election =

25th Philippine senatorial election

- May 8, 1995

12 (of the 24) seats in the Senate 13 seats needed for a majority
Alliance	LABAN	NPC
Seats won	9	3
Popular vote	123,660,355	56,015,645
Percentage	67.71	30.67
Senate President before election
Edgardo Angara
Laban
Elected Senate President
Edgardo Angara
Laban

The 25th election of members to the Senate of the Philippines was held on Monday, May 8, 1995, to elect 12 of the 24 seats in the Senate. Filipinos protected the ballot boxes with their lives and campaigned against politicians who used bribery, flying voters, violence, election rigging, stealing of ballot boxes, etc. The Philippine National Police (PNP) listed five people dead and listed more than 200 hotspots before and 300 hotspots during the election.

The two largest parties, Lakas–NUCD and the Laban ng Demokratikong Pilipino (LDP, then known as Laban), contested the senate election under the Lakas–Laban Coalition and won nine out of the 12 seats contested. The opposition-led coalition was composed of the Nationalist People's Coalition (NPC) which had an alliance with the People's Reform Party (PRP), though they contested the election separately.

== Electoral system ==
Philippine Senate elections are via pluraity block voting, with the entire country as an at-large "district". Each voter has 12 votes, and can vote for up to 12 candidates. Seats up were for the 13th to 24th placed candidates in 1992. This is the first time that 12 seats will be up, and where the usual operation of the 1987 constitution is followed.

This was also the first midterm election for the 1987 constitution, and the first since 1971, as the date the elected candidates take office falls at the midway point of President Fidel V. Ramos' six-year term.

== Candidates ==
There were two major coalitions in this election:

- Lakas–Laban Coalition, a united ticket between the administration party Lakas–NUCD–UMDP (Lakas) and opposition Laban ng Demokratikong Pilipino (Laban)
- Nationalist People's Coalition (NPC), other opposition politicians who against the Fidel V. Ramos administration.

The People's Reform Party (PRP) were initially a third party, but its primary candidate, defeated 1992 presidential candidate Miriam Defensor Santiago, was drafted into the NPC slate.

Notably, the COMELEC did not allow any independents to run, but candidates from Bicol Saro, Partido Demokratiko Sosyalista ng Pilipinas (PDSP) and Partido Nacionalista ng Pilipinas (PNP; no relation to then moribund Nacionalista Party) were allowed to run.

=== Administration coalition ===
Lakas–Laban Coalition ticket
Name	Party
Gloria Macapagal Arroyo	Laban
Rodolfo Biazon	Laban
Franklin Drilon	Lakas
Juan Ponce Enrile	Nacionalista
Marcelo Fernan	Laban
Juan Flavier	Lakas
Ramon Magsaysay Jr.	Lakas
Ramon Mitra Jr.	Laban
Serge Osmeña	Lakas
Aquilino Pimentel Jr.	PDP–Laban
Raul Roco	Laban
Francisco Tatad	Laban

=== Opposition coalition ===
Nationalist People's Coalition ticket
Name	Party
Rosemarie Arenas	NPC
Gaudencio Beduya	NPC
Nikki Coseteng	NPC
Amanda T. Cruz	NPC
Ramon Fernandez	NPC
Gregorio Honasan	Independent
Bongbong Marcos	KBL
Adelisa A. Raymundo	NPC
Manuel C. Roxas	NPC
Miriam Defensor Santiago	PRP
Almarin C. Tillah	NPC
Arturo Tolentino	NPC

=== Other candidates ===
Bicol Saro ticket
Name	Party
Vicente N. Biego	Bicol Saro
Jose Misa	Bicol Saro

People's Reform Party ticket
Name	Party
Herman T. Laurel	PRP
Brigido Simon (withdrew)	PRP

Non-independents not in tickets
Name	Party
Ibrahim Amerel	PDSP
Felino C. Polintan Jr.	PNP

Note: Party affiliation based on Certificate of Candidacy.

== Retiring and term limited incumbents ==
This was the first Senate election where there were term-limited incumbents.

1. Butz Aquino (Laban), term limited, ran for representative from Makati's 2nd district in 1998 and won
2. Joey Lina (Laban), term limited, ran for governor of Laguna and won
3. John Henry Osmeña (NPC), term limited, ran for representative from Cebu's 3rd district and won; ran for senator in 1998 and won
4. Santanina Rasul (Lakas), term limited; ran for senator in 1998 and in 2001, both lost
5. Wigberto Tañada (Liberal), term limited, ran for representative from Quezon's 4th district and won; ran for senator in 2001 and lost

=== Mid-term vacancies ===
1. Teofisto Guingona Jr. (Laban), appointed Executive Secretary on July 6, 1993

== Controversies ==
=== "Dagdag-Bawas" scam ===
As the counting of votes was ongoing on May 11, former Senator Aquilino Pimentel Jr. alleged that some senatorial candidates currently outside the unfinished tally's top twelve spots were beginning to rig votes by bribing people involved in the electoral process. Pimentel also shared that two of his fellow Lakas-Laban senatorial candidates revealed to him that a vote-buying scam called "Oplan Dagdag-Bawas" (lit. 'Add-Subtract') was occurring in Mindanao, where canvassers are bribed to shave off votes meant for Pimentel and transfer them to other candidates. Pimentel later admitted that he lacks evidence for his claim, while a Comelec commissioner named Regalado Maambong dismissed the allegation as false. After the election, Pimentel established the Foundation for Clean Elections, Inc. in Mandaluyong, Metro Manila to help prevent fraud in the country's elections.

By late 1995, the Senate Electoral Tribunal ordered to deduct more than 58,000 "unlawfully credited" votes for Juan Ponce Enrile in Bataan and Isabela from his tally, alongside 10,000 votes for Gringo Honasan and 7,000 votes for Ramon Mitra Jr..

In May 1996, Maambong reversed his stance from the previous year and revealed that Comelec has found evidence of widespread cheating during the election. Resureccion Borra, then executive director of Comelec, later stated that the 1995 election was the first time "dagdag-bawas" was committed on a massive scale, and announced that they will attempt to prosecute canvassers in the provinces of Ilocos Norte, Isabela, Bataan, and Lanao del Sur. In July 1996, Senator Serge Osmeña revealed that he discovered a 30,000 vote discrepancy for him in Pasig City between the manual tally done by the Treasurer's Office and the certificates of canvass. By December, a regional trial court in Bataan ordered for the arrest of Cenon Uy, an assistant regional director for Comelec in Central Luzon, for having allegedly tampered with election results in the region to favor the candidacy of Enrile, though he would remain in office until late 2000 when a pending court case against him forced his resignation.

On February 10, 2000, Antonio Llorente and Ligaya Salayon, who were respectively Pasig City prosecutor and member of the Pasig board of canvassers at the time of the election, was charged by the Supreme Court for violating election laws after they admitted their "honest mistake" of taking away votes from Pimentel and transferring them to Enrile. Llorente eventually went on indefinite leave from his position as Justice Undersecretary in September due to the Supreme Court standing by its ruling.

On September 11, 2000, Arsenia Garcia, who was chair of the Alaminos, Pangasinan municipal canvassers during the election, was convicted of electoral fraud by a Regional Trial Court in Alaminos due to her discarding more than 5,000 votes that were in favor of Pimentel, and sentenced to six years in prison.

== Results ==
The Laban ng Demokratikong Pilipino (Laban) and the Lakas–NUCD won four each, while the Nacionalista Party, the Nationalist People's Coalition (NPC), People's Reform Party (PRP), and an independent won one seat each.

Three incumbent Laban senators won: Gloria Macapagal Arroyo, Raul Roco, and Francisco Tatad (originally elected as an NPC member). Nikki Coseteng was the sole NPC senator to successfully defend her seat.

Neophyte senators were Lakas's Franklin Drilon, Juan Flavier, Ramon Magsaysay Jr., and Serge Osmeña, Laban's Marcelo Fernan, Miriam Defensor Santiago of the PRP, and independent Gregorio Honasan.

Returning was Juan Ponce Enrile, who last served in the Senate in 1992.

Incumbents defeated were Laban's Rodolfo Biazon and NPC's Arturo Tolentino.

	1	2	3	4	5	6	7	8	9	10	11	12	13	14	15	16	17	18	19	20	21	22	23	24
Before election												‡	‡	‡	‡	‡	‡	‡	‡^	‡	‡	‡	‡	
Election result	Not up											PRP	LABAN									NPC		Not up
After election												+	+	+	+	*	*	√	√	√	+	√	+	
Senate bloc	Majority bloc																					Minority bloc		

Key:

- ‡ Seats up
- + Gained by a party from another party
- √ Held by the incumbent
- * Held by the same party with a new senator
- ^ Vacancy

=== Per candidate ===
Candidate	Party or alliance		Votes	%
Gloria Macapagal Arroyo	Lakas–Laban Coalition	Laban ng Demokratikong Pilipino	15,745,741	61.18
Raul Roco	Lakas–Laban Coalition	Laban ng Demokratikong Pilipino	12,509,736	48.61
Ramon Magsaysay Jr.	Lakas–Laban Coalition	Lakas–NUCD	11,862,458	46.09
Franklin Drilon	Lakas–Laban Coalition	Lakas–NUCD	11,032,476	42.87
Juan Flavier	Lakas–Laban Coalition	Lakas–NUCD	10,748,528	41.76
Miriam Defensor Santiago	Nationalist People's Coalition	People's Reform Party	9,497,231	36.90
Serge Osmeña	Lakas–Laban Coalition	Lakas–NUCD	9,390,935	36.49
Francisco Tatad	Lakas–Laban Coalition	Laban ng Demokratikong Pilipino	9,146,951	35.54
Gregorio Honasan	Nationalist People's Coalition	Independent	8,968,616	34.85
Marcelo Fernan	Lakas–Laban Coalition	Laban ng Demokratikong Pilipino	8,762,235	34.05
Juan Ponce Enrile	Lakas–Laban Coalition	Independent	8,701,191	33.81
Nikki Coseteng	Nationalist People's Coalition		8,700,278	33.81
Ramon Mitra Jr.	Lakas–Laban Coalition	Laban ng Demokratikong Pilipino	8,650,618	33.61
Rodolfo Biazon	Lakas–Laban Coalition	Laban ng Demokratikong Pilipino	8,587,338	33.37
Nene Pimentel	Lakas–Laban Coalition	PDP–Laban	8,522,148	33.11
Bongbong Marcos	Nationalist People's Coalition	Kilusang Bagong Lipunan	8,168,768	31.74
Arturo Tolentino	Nationalist People's Coalition		7,726,006	30.02
Ramon Fernandez	Nationalist People's Coalition		3,572,604	13.88
Rose Marie Arenas	Nationalist People's Coalition		3,178,837	12.35
Manuel C. Roxas	Nationalist People's Coalition		2,455,764	9.54
Herman T. Laurel	People's Reform Party		1,395,015	5.42
Almarin C. Tillah	Nationalist People's Coalition		1,165,164	4.53
Amanda T. Cruz	Nationalist People's Coalition		1,008,180	3.92
Gaudencio Beduya	Nationalist People's Coalition		829,082	3.22
Adelisa Raymundo	Nationalist People's Coalition		745,115	2.90
Ibrahim Amerel	Partido Demokratiko Sosyalista ng Pilipinas		482,328	1.87
Vicente N. Biego	Bicol Saro		417,901	1.62
Felino C. Polintan Jr.	Partido Nacionalista ng Pilipinas		393,712	1.53
Brigido Simon (Note: Withdrew but remained on the ballot)	People's Reform Party		152,161	0.59
Jose Misa	Bicol Saro		109,711	0.43
Total			182,626,828	100.00
Total votes			25,736,505	–
Registered voters/turnout			36,415,154	70.68

=== Per coalition ===
Party or alliance		Votes	%	Seats
Lakas–Laban Coalition	Laban ng Demokratikong Pilipino	63,402,619	34.72	4
Lakas–Laban Coalition	Lakas–NUCD	43,034,397	23.56	4
Lakas–Laban Coalition	PDP–Laban	8,522,148	4.67	0
Lakas–Laban Coalition	Independent	8,701,191	4.76	1
Lakas–Laban Coalition	Total	123,660,355	67.71	9
Nationalist People's Coalition	Nationalist People's Coalition	29,381,030	16.09	1
Nationalist People's Coalition	People's Reform Party	9,497,231	5.20	1
Nationalist People's Coalition	Kilusang Bagong Lipunan	8,168,768	4.47	0
Nationalist People's Coalition	Independent	8,968,616	4.91	1
Nationalist People's Coalition	Total	56,015,645	30.67	3
People's Reform Party		1,547,176	0.85	0
Bicol Saro		527,612	0.29	0
Partido Demokratiko Sosyalista ng Pilipinas		482,328	0.26	0
Partido Nacionalista ng Pilipinas		393,712	0.22	0
Total		182,626,828	100.00	12
Total votes		25,736,505	–	
Registered voters/turnout		36,415,154	70.68	

Vote share
Lakas-Laban	67.71%
NPC	30.67%
Others	1.62%

Senate seats
Lakas-Laban	75.00%
NPC	25.00%
Others	0%

=== Per party ===
Party	Votes	%	+/–	Seats				
Party	Votes	%	+/–	Up	Before	Won	After	+/−
Laban ng Demokratikong Pilipino	63,402,619	34.72	−10.28	6	16	4	14	−2
Lakas–NUCD	43,034,397	23.56	+5.96	1	2	4	5	+3
Nationalist People's Coalition	29,381,030	16.09	−1.62	4	5	1	2	−3
People's Reform Party	11,044,407	6.05	−3.83	0	0	1	1	New
PDP–Laban	8,522,148	4.67	New	0	0	0	0	0
Kilusang Bagong Lipunan	8,168,768	4.47	−0.12	0	0	0	0	0
Bicol Saro	527,612	0.29	New	0	0	0	0	0
Partido Demokratiko Sosyalista ng Pilipinas	482,328	0.26	New	0	0	0	0	0
Partido Nacionalista ng Pilipinas	393,712	0.22	New	0	0	0	0	–
Independent	17,669,807	9.68	+9.53	0	0	2	2	New
Liberal Party				1	1	0	0	−1
Total	182,626,828	100.00	–	12	24	12	24	0
Total votes	25,736,505	–						
Registered voters/turnout	36,415,154	70.68						

Vote share
Laban	34.72%
Lakas	23.56%
NPC	16.09%
PRP	6.05%
Independent	9.73%
Others	5.92%

Senate seats won
Laban	33.33%
Lakas	33.33%
NPC	8.33%
PRP	8.33%
Independent	16.66%
Others	0.00%

== Defeated incumbents ==
1. Rodolfo Biazon (Laban/Lakas–Laban), ran in 1998 and won
2. Arturo Tolentino (NPC), retired from politics

== See also ==
- Commission on Elections
- Politics of the Philippines
- Philippine elections
- 10th Congress of the Philippines
