= Franklin Drilon =

Filipino lawyer and politician (born 1945)

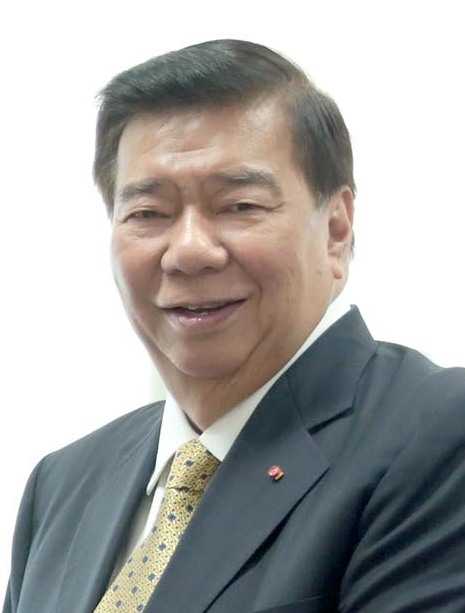
- Drilon in 2018

22nd, 24th, & 27th President of the Senate of the Philippines
- In office July 22, 2013 – June 30, 2016
- Preceded by: Jinggoy Estrada (acting)
- Succeeded by: Koko Pimentel
- In office July 23, 2001 – July 24, 2006
- Preceded by: Nene Pimentel
- Succeeded by: Manny Villar
- In office April 12, 2000 – November 13, 2000
- Preceded by: Blas Ople
- Succeeded by: Nene Pimentel

President pro tempore of the Senate of the Philippines
- In office July 25, 2016 – February 27, 2017
- Preceded by: Ralph Recto
- Succeeded by: Ralph Recto

Senate Majority Leader
- In office January 26, 1998 – April 12, 2000
- Preceded by: Francisco Tatad
- Succeeded by: Francisco Tatad

Senate Minority Leader
- In office February 28, 2017 – June 30, 2022
- Preceded by: Ralph Recto
- Succeeded by: Koko Pimentel

Senator of the Philippines
- In office June 30, 2010 – June 30, 2022
- In office June 30, 1995 – June 30, 2007

Chair of the Philippine Senate Finance Committee
- In office July 26, 2010 – July 22, 2013
- Preceded by: Edgardo Angara
- Succeeded by: Francis Escudero

25th Executive Secretary of the Philippines
- In office July 15, 1991 – June 30, 1992
- President: Corazon Aquino
- Preceded by: Oscar Orbos
- Succeeded by: Peter Garuccho

44th and 46th Secretary of Justice
- In office July 1, 1992 – February 2, 1995
- President: Fidel V. Ramos
- Preceded by: Silvestre Bello III
- Succeeded by: Demetrio G. Demetria
- In office January 4, 1990 – July 14, 1991
- President: Corazon Aquino
- Preceded by: Sedfrey A. Ordoñez
- Succeeded by: Silvestre Bello III

Secretary of Labor and Employment
- In office January 5, 1987 – January 2, 1990
- President: Corazon Aquino
- Preceded by: Augusto A. Sanchez
- Succeeded by: Dionisio C. dela Serna

13th President of the Liberal Party
- In office August 10, 2004 – November 5, 2007
- Preceded by: Florencio Abad
- Succeeded by: Mar Roxas

Personal details
- Born: Franklin Magtunao Drilon; November 28, 1945 (age 80) Iloilo City, Iloilo, Philippines
- Party: Liberal (2003–present)
- Other political affiliations: Independent (2000–2003); LAMMP (1998–2000); Lakas (1995–1998); UNIDO (1987–1988)
- Spouses: Violeta Calvo (died); Mila Serrano-Genuino
- Children: 2
- Education: University of the Philippines Diliman (BA, LL.B.)
- Occupation: Lawyer, Politician

Franklin Magtunao Drilon (Tagalog pronunciation: [dɾiˈlɔn]; born November 28, 1945) is a Filipino lawyer and former politician. He has served thrice as president of the Senate: in 2000, from 2001 to 2006, and from 2013 to 2016.

Having also served as Senate's president pro tempore, majority leader, and minority leader, he is the first of two senators to have held all four of the Senate's major leadership positions; the second being Senator Tito Sotto. A member of the Liberal Party since 2003, he has previously led the party as president, chairman, and vice-chairman.

He also served as labor secretary, justice secretary, and executive secretary in the administration of President Corazon Aquino. He became the secretary of justice again during the administration of President Fidel V. Ramos.

Drilon was born and raised in Iloilo City and studied law at the University of the Philippines. He placed third in the 1969 Bar Exams and worked as a private practice lawyer before joining the government.

== Early life ==
Drilon was born on November 28, 1945, in Iloilo City, Iloilo and is the eldest son of Cesar Drilon Sr. and Primitiva Magtunao. He took his elementary education at the Baluarte Elementary School in Molo, Iloilo City, and graduated in 1957. He finished his secondary education at the U.P. - Iloilo College (now University of the Philippines High School in Iloilo) in 1961.

From the University of the Philippines Diliman (U.P.) where he received his Bachelor of Arts Political Science degree in 1965. At U.P., he was the associate editor of the student newspaper Philippine Collegian and served as councilor of the U.P. Student Council. Among his classmates were future politicians Miriam Defensor Santiago and Ronaldo Zamora. In 1969, he completed his Bachelor of Laws (LL.B) at the University of the Philippines College of Law in UP Diliman. He placed 3rd in the 1969 Philippine Bar Examinations with an 86.85% bar rating.

In the same year, he served as an associate lawyer of Sycip, Salazar, Luna, Manalo & Feliciano Law Offices (now SyCip, Salazar, Hernandez & Gatmaitan). He moved to Angara, Abello, Concepcion, Regala & Cruz Law Offices (ACCRALaw) in 1974, where he still serves as Senior Counsel. ACCRALaw elevated him to partner in 1975, co-managing partner in 1981 and managing partner in 1986.

Drilon was also a bar examiner on labor and social legislation in the 1979 and 1984 bar examinations. He also became the vice-president and governor of the Employers Confederation of the Philippines (ECOP) and the vice-president, board member and treasurer of the Personnel Management Association of the Philippines (PMAP).

== Political career ==
=== Corazon Aquino cabinet ===
As justice secretary, Drilon was instrumental in the prosecution and conviction of Mayor Antonio Sanchez of Calauan, Laguna, who masterminded the rape-slaying of a UP Los Baños coed and the murder of his friend; and Claudio Teehankee Jr., who was figured in the gun slaying of Maureen Hultman. Both cases ended up in convictions.

=== Senate ===
Drilon in a remote location during a Senate session in 2022.

In 1992, most of the Aquino cabinet were drafted for the Senate candidate line-up of the newly created party, Lakas; Drilon opted to help President Aquino finish her term. He was again given the opportunity to run as a senatorial candidate of the Lakas–Laban Coalition in the 1995 election. He got the fourth highest number of votes in that Senate race. In 1998, he bolted Lakas and joined the Laban ng Makabayang Masang Pilipino (LAMMP) and supported Joseph Estrada in the presidency contest. He was selected as Senate majority floor leader the same year. In 1999, he was among those who voted in favor of the ratification of the Visiting Forces Agreement.

When Marcelo Fernan died of cancer the same year, he made concessions with Blas Ople in sharing the seat of the Senate President. They agreed that Ople will serve as Senate President from 1999 to 2000 and he would serve from 2000 to 2001. Ople served his term from July 1999-July 2000. Drilon was installed as Senate president in July 2000. In October 2000 he issued a statement about the Juetengate scandal of President Joseph Estrada. He was removed the next month through a Senate revamp and Aquilino Pimentel Jr. was installed as Senate president (Drilon would also be succeeded by his son Aquilino Pimentel III as Senate president in 2016). In December 2000, an impeachment case was filed against Estrada in the Senate. During the January 13, 2001, session of the impeachment proceedings, he was one of those who voted in favor of the opening of a mysterious second bank envelope. Their vote was outnumbered and Drilon was remembered as the senator who cried in front of Pimentel together with Senator Loren Legarda, as impeachment lawyers walked out of the session hall in protest. Joseph Estrada was subsequently ousted that very evening by what would be remembered as the second EDSA People Power Revolution. Drilon allowed Pimentel to occupy the Senate presidency until the end of the regular session in June 2001.

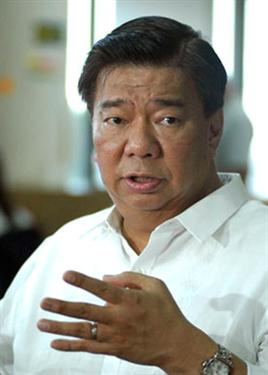
Drilon in 2007.

When the session resumed in July 2001, Pimentel was replaced by Drilon as senate president. Pimentel bolted the administration coalition and joined forces with the opposition coalition.

Drilon ran again for the Senate as independent but was under the People Power Coalition senatorial line-up. The lineup was carefully chosen and the first letter of the candidate's surname (except for Roberto Pagdanganan) ended up with the line VOT FOR D CHAMMP. The line became a hit, and it led to the election of most of the coalition's senatorial candidates including Drilon. He again served as Senate President from 2001 to 2006.

In 2003, administration coalition partner Liberal Party, to which President Arroyo's father, Diosdado Macapagal, served as chairman in the 1960s, invited Drilon to be its member. Days later, Drilon was elected chairman of the political party. Before the 2004 elections, Drilon invited Senator Rodolfo Biazon to be a party member. Biazon bolted Raul Roco's Aksyon Demokratiko (Aksyon) only days after he joined that party's convention to become a Liberal.

Drilon had close contacts with President Gloria Macapagal Arroyo since 2001 and actively supported her when she ran for a fresh mandate to occupy the office of the President. That relationship ended on July 8, however, when Drilon—together with Biazon and some prominent Liberals—decided to withdraw their support for her and asked for her resignation. In Arroyo's 2005 State of the Nation Address, Drilon was the only one noticed not applauding throughout the entire program. Drilon has been a vocal critic of the NorthRail project, a Chinese government-backed project to overhaul Manila's decrepit railway system. The railway was to be the first double-tracked railway in the country, and was expected to eventually extend to Clark in Pampanga and, according to the architects, as far north as San Fernando, La Union. During his second term as senate president, Drilon spearheaded the Senate's confronting the excesses of the executive branch by authorizing the Senate standing committees to conduct inquiries in aid of legislation; he led the Chamber in opposing Executive Order No. 264, which prohibited members of the Cabinet from attending hearings of Congress, the Senate in particular, without permission from the President; he also opposed Proclamation No. 1017, which imposed a state of national emergency in the country. The Supreme Court sustained the Senate's stand on the two issues. He was hailed by all as the leading defender of the Senate's independence and of its constitutional duties. Drilon likewise led the Senate in opposing moves by the House of Representatives to amend the Constitution that would supposedly shift the legislature to a unicameral legislature, abolishing the Senate.

In 2006, Drilon was succeeded as senate president by Manny Villar in accordance with a term-sharing agreement they forged in early 2004. And from 2006 to the end of his second term as senator on 2007, Drilon served as the chairman of the Senate Committee on Finance and worked firmly for the enactment of the new national budget law on 2007.

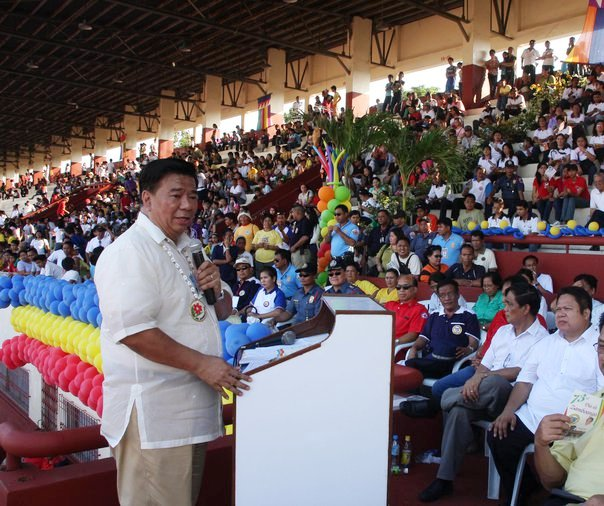
Senator Drilon at a speaking engagement in Zamboanga City.

Drilon was re-elected to the Senate in 2010 and was then honored for his 15-year service to the senate (1995–2010). He served as the assistant majority leader and chairman of the Senate Committee on Finance and led the Senate in enacting the national budget laws on time for 2011, 2012 and 2013. He likewise primarily authored a law that created an oversight body of all government owned and controlled corporations (GOCCs) which would check them from incurring financial excesses and as well as ensuring their financial stability and makes them fiscally responsible. On 2012, after Senator Ralph Recto stepped down as the chairman of the Senate Committee on Ways and Means, Drilon, as its vice-chairman took over as its new chairman and worked firmly for the enactment of the Sin Tax Law that would impose higher taxes on the cigarettes and liquors. Drilon proudly called it as "anti-cancer law" for he firmly believes that the law would discourage the people from taking cigarettes so that they will not suffer lung cancer.

During the impeachment trial of then-Chief Justice Renato Corona in early 2012, he acted as one of the senator-judges and later voted for his conviction and removal from office and disqualification from holding any elective or appointive government office.

Halfway through the presidency of Benigno Aquino III, Drilon won the majority of votes after being voted as Senate president, following the resignation of former Senate President Juan Ponce Enrile. It was predicted long after the resignation of Enrile, that Drilon would have the majority. Enrile was subsequently elected as minority leader but was then imprisoned.

Drilon is the acknowledged father of corporate lawyers in the Philippines, having sponsored and wrote the Revised Corporation Code in 2018.

== Personal life ==
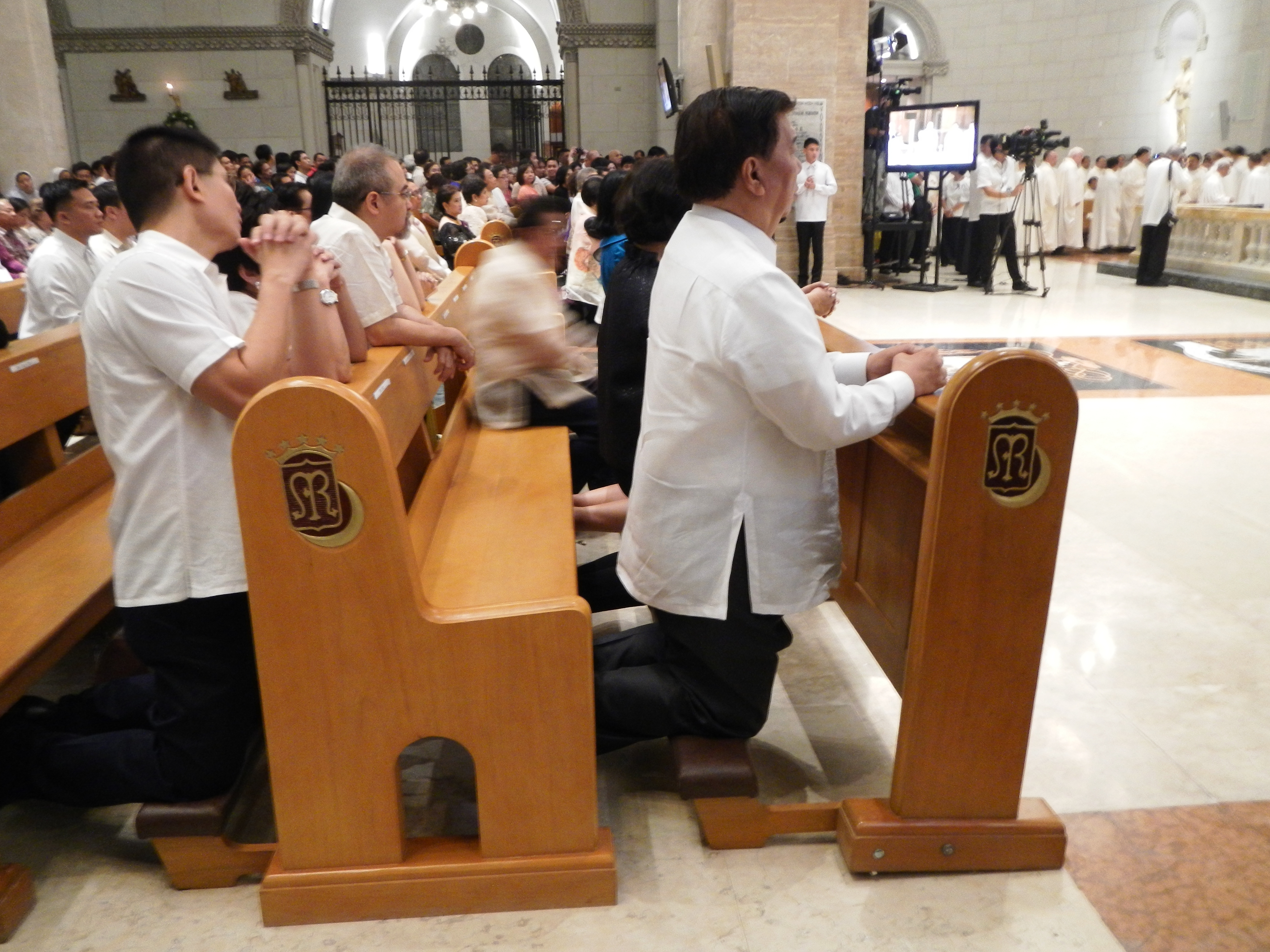
Senator Drilon praying during the reopening of the Manila Cathedral

Drilon was married to fellow lawyer and ACCRA senior partner Violeta Calvo, with whom he had two children, Eliza and Patrick. During his candidacy for a Senate seat in 1995, Drilon often traveled to the US to be with his wife who was then being treated for lung cancer. Mrs. Drilon died of the disease in September 1995, two months after her husband assumed his Senate seat. Two years after, Drilon proposed to close family friend Mila Serrano-Genuino, who was a widow. They married with former Presidents Aquino and Ramos as wedding sponsors.

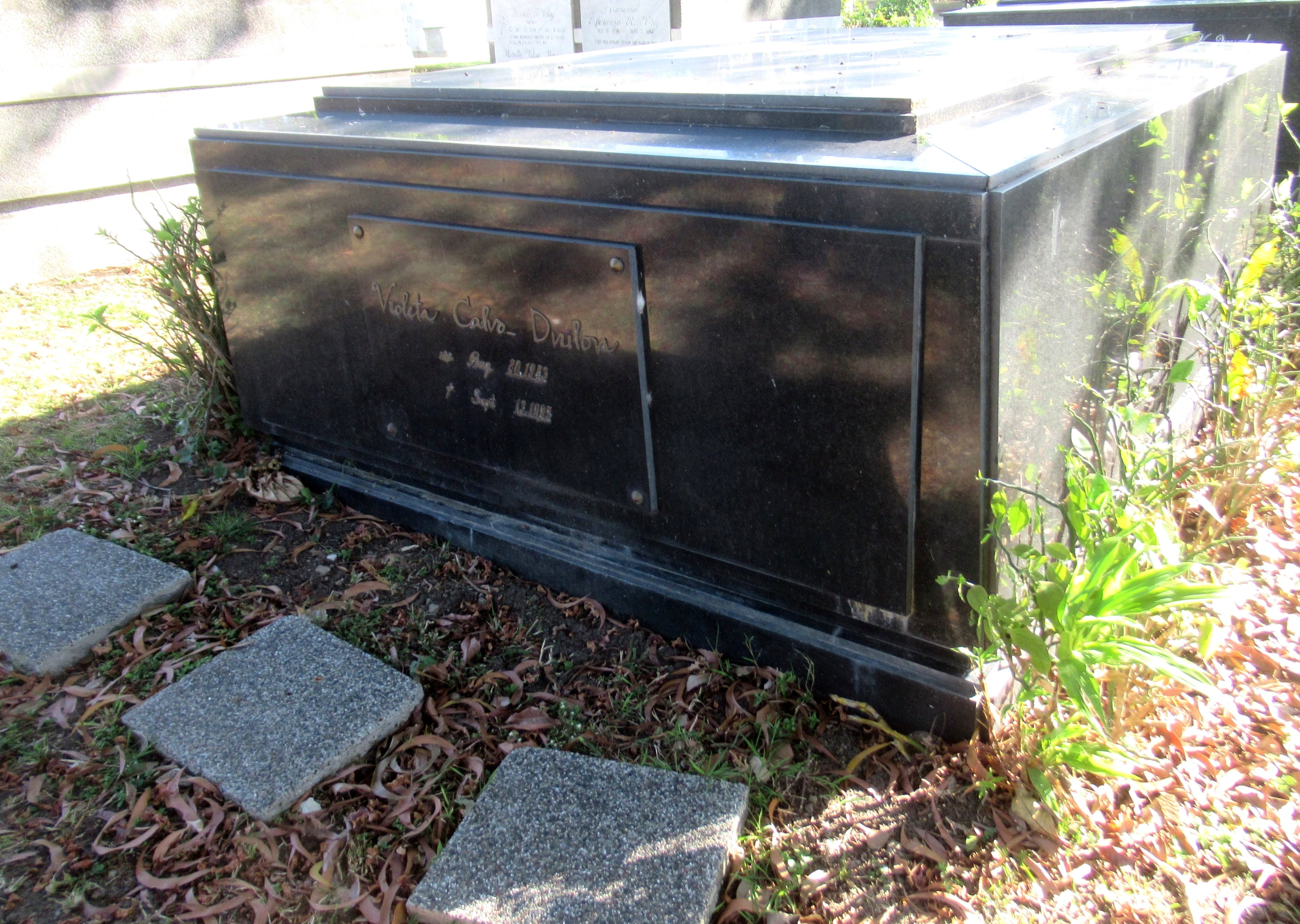
Violeta Driloin's grave at Manila Memorial Park – Sucat.

Drilon has a nephew named Rock who is married to ABS-CBN broadcast journalist Ces Drilon. Drilon is also a second cousin of former Iloilo City Mayor Jed Patrick Mabilog.

Drilon is a member of the Rotary Club, Makati Chapter. He was an active member of the Integrated Bar of the Philippines (IBP) where he was a former President of the Pasay–Makati–Mandaluyong–San Juan Chapter. Although he was born in Iloilo, he is a registered voter of Greenhills, San Juan.

Central Philippine University bestowed upon him an honorary degree of Doctor of Humanities (Honoris Causa).

== Electoral history ==
Electoral history of Franklin Drilon
Year	Office	Party	Votes received				Result
Year	Office	Party	Total	%	P.	Swing	Result
1995	Senator of the Philippines	Lakas–NUCD	11,032,476	42.87%	5th	—N/a	Won
2001	Senator of the Philippines	Independent	11,301,700	38.34%	4th	-4.53	Won
2010	Senator of the Philippines	Liberal	15,871,117	41.60%	4th	+3.26	Won
2016	Senator of the Philippines	Liberal	18,607,391	41.37%	1st	-0.23	Won

Senate of the Philippines
Preceded by Francisco Tatad	Majority leader of the Senate of the Philippines; 1998–2000	Succeeded by Francisco Tatad
Preceded by Blas Ople	President of the Senate of the Philippines; 2000	Succeeded by Aquilino Pimentel Jr.
Preceded by Aquilino Pimentel Jr.	President of the Senate of the Philippines; 2001–2006	Succeeded by Manny Villar
Preceded by Edgardo Angara	Chair of the Philippine Senate; Finance Committee; 2010–2013	Succeeded by Francis Escudero
Preceded by Juan Ponce Enrile	President of the Senate of the Philippines; 2013–2016	Succeeded by Aquilino Pimentel III
Preceded by Ralph Recto	President pro tempore of the Senate of the Philippines; 2016–2017	Succeeded by Ralph Recto
Preceded by Ralph Recto	Minority Floor Leader of the Senate of the Philippines; 2017–2022	Succeeded by Koko Pimentel
Political offices
Preceded by Sedfrey Ordoñez	Secretary of Justice; 1990–1991	Succeeded by Silvestre Bello III
Preceded by Eduardo Montenegro	Secretary of Justice; 1992–1995	Succeeded by Demetrio Demetria
Party political offices
Preceded by Florencio Abad	President of Liberal Party; 2004–2007	Succeeded by Mar Roxas
Preceded by Francis Pangilinan	Chairman of Liberal Party; 2006–2011	Succeeded by Benigno Aquino III
