= Lakas–CMD (1991) =

Defunct Philippine political party

Lakas–Christian Muslim Democrats
- Chairperson: Fidel V. Ramos (1991–1998); Gloria Macapagal Arroyo (1998–2008)
- Founder: Fidel V. Ramos (Lakas); Raul Manglapus (NUCD); Sanchez Ali (UMDP)
- Founded: 1968 (NUCD); 1971 (UMDP); December 1991 (Lakas); January 3, 1992 (merger)
- Dissolved: June 18, 2008 (merged into Lakas–Kampi–CMD)
- Merger of: Lakas ng Tao; National Union of Christian Democrats; United Muslim Democrats of the Philippines
- Split from: Laban ng Demokratikong Pilipino
- Merged into: Lakas–Kampi–CMD
- Political position: Centre-right
- National affiliation: TEAM Unity (2007); K–4 (2004); PPC (2001); Lakas–Laban (1995)
- International affiliation: Centrist Democrat International
- Colors: Yellow (1991–2001) (Note: as Lakas–NUCD and Lakas–NUCD–UMDP); Sky blue (2004–2008) (Note: as Lakas–CMD)

Lakas–Christian Muslim Democrats (transl. People Power–Christian Muslim Democrats), (Note: Lakas does not literally means only Power, as the Lakas group of Ramos originally known as Partido Lakas ng Tao or People Power Party, but commonly known as Lakas) shortened as Lakas–CMD, with being abbreviated and popularly known as Lakas, was a political party in the Philippines. Its ideology and that of its successor is heavily influenced by Christian and Islamic democracy. The party's influence on Philippine society is very strong, especially after the People Power Revolution, which has led the country to elect two presidents from the party, namely Fidel V. Ramos, a United Methodist, and Gloria Macapagal Arroyo, a Roman Catholic.

In May 2009, Lakas–CMD merged with Arroyo's Kabalikat ng Mamamayang Pilipino, thereby being known as Lakas Kampi CMD, a completely new entity. In May 2012, Lakas Kampi CMD renamed itself again as Lakas–CMD after the separation of KAMPI.

== History ==
=== Formation ===
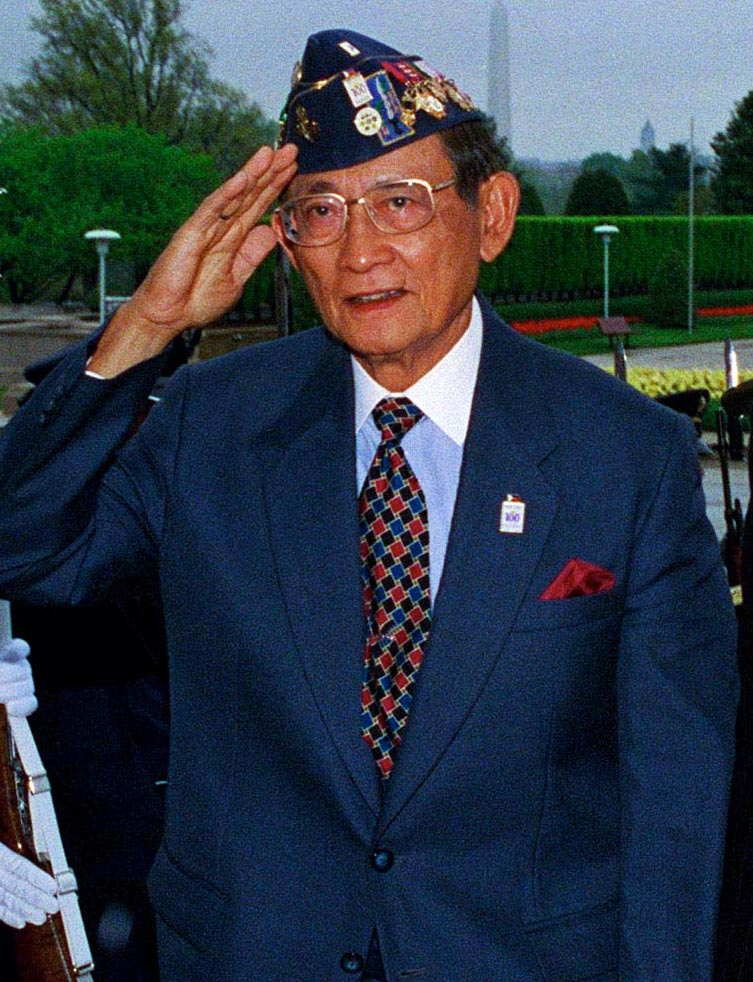
President Fidel V. Ramos, founder of Lakas–NUCD

In November 1991, former National Defense Secretary Fidel V. Ramos joined the Laban ng Demokratikong Pilipino to seek its support for his 1992 presidential bid. That month, the LDP held a national convention to nominate its presidential and vice-presidential candidates for 1992. After losing the presidential nomination to LDP co-founder and House Speaker Ramon Mitra, Ramos bolted the party and, together with fellow LDP member and then Pangasinan Representative Jose de Venecia Jr., organized the United People Power Movement. The new organization was officially named Partido Lakas ng Tao (or Lakas ng EDSA) and was formally launched on January 3, 1992, at Club Filipino in Greenhills, San Juan. The party's name was intended to highlight Ramos' key role in the 1986 People Power Revolution and to present the movement as an alternative to traditional politicians, commonly known as trapos.

At the initiative of de Venecia, Ramos ultimately merged Lakas ng Tao with the National Union of Christian Democrats, a cluster of the defunct Progressive Party led by former Senator Raul Manglapus, to form Lakas–National Union of Christian Democrats. Ramos and De Venecia also enticed several LDP members to join the newly formed party, a move criticized by LDP co-founder Congressman Peping Cojuangco.

=== 1992: Ed sa '92 ===
Ramos invited Cebu Governor Lito Osmeña to serve as his vice-presidential running-mate. Ramos won the presidential election, defeating former Agrarian Reform Secretary Miriam Defensor Santiago of the People's Reform Party, Mitra and four other presidential candidates. On the other hand, Osmeña lost the vice-presidential race to Senator Joseph Estrada of the Nationalist People's Coalition. Osmeña was later appointed by Ramos as his chief economic adviser, serving from 1993 to 1997.

Because Ramos won with only a low plurality, de Venecia created the Rainbow Coalition, bringing together Lakas, LDP, NPC and other major national parties.

=== 1995: Lakas–Laban ===
In 1995, Lakas–NUCD formed an alliance with LDP, then known as Laban, for the 1995 legislative elections. This coalition, called the Lakas–Laban Coalition, won a majority in both houses of Congress. The coalition eventually folded, however, following disputes with LDP, then led by then-Senate President Edgardo Angara.

=== 1998: Victory '98 ===
In 1997, Lakas–NUCD was joined by the United Muslim Democrats of the Philippines, led by former ambassador Sanchez Ali, thereby changing the party's name to Lakas–National Union of Christian Democrats–United Muslim Democrats of the Philippines. In November of that year, Lakas held a national convention to select its nominees for the 1998 national elections. The crowded contest for the presidential nomination narrowed into a close fight between Ramos' two leading political lieutenants, House Speaker de Venecia and former defense secretary Renato de Villa. Other figures who joined the nomination process were Osmeña, Bulacan Governor Roberto Pagdanganan, Finance Secretary Roberto de Ocampo, Senator Ramon Magsaysay Jr., and Philippine Charity Sweepstakes Office chair Manuel Morato. After several rounds of secret balloting, de Venecia secured the nomination and was officially proclaimed as the party's presidential nominee for 1998.

After losing the nomination, de Villa left Lakas and formed the Partido para sa Demokratikong Reporma, with Pangasinan Governor Oscar Orbos as his running mate. Osmeña, who also failed to secure Ramos' support, launched his own presidential bid under the newly formed Probinsya Muna Development Initiative, with Ismael Sueno as his running mate. Morato also ran for the highest office, with Partido Bansang Marangal as his political vehicle. Meanwhile, Lakas nominated Senator Gloria Macapagal Arroyo as its candidate for vice president. Arroyo had originally intended to run for president under her own party, Kabalikat ng Mamamayang Pilipino. Magsaysay withdrew his presidential bid, while Pagdanganan and de Ocampo joined the Lakas senatorial slate but both lost.

De Venecia lost the presidential election to Vice President Estrada of Laban ng Makabayang Masang Pilipino by a significant plurality. On the other hand, Arroyo was elected vice president in the same manner as Estrada, defeating Senator Angara, Estrada's running mate, while KAMPI was put in hiatus.

=== Arroyo administration ===
In early 2004, the party officially changed its name to Lakas–Christian Muslim Democrats. At the same time, the meaning of Lakas in its name was redefined from the original Lakas ng Tao (People Power) to Lakas ng EDSA (Strength of EDSA). This was also the name used by the party during the 2004 Philippine general election, in which it served as the leading member of the Koalisyon ng Katapatan at Karanasan sa Kinabukasan, or K4 Coalition.

By 2003, Arroyo stated that she would not seek a full presidential term in 2004. Following her statement, Senate Lakas stalwarts Magsaysay, Juan Flavier and Loren Legarda declared their intention in getting the Lakas presidential nomination. However, only Magsaysay and Flavier indicated their willingness to withdraw should Arroyo reverse her decision. Flavier also stated that he would step aside if Legarda pursued the presidential nomination.

At the time, Legarda was reportedly considering potential running mates, including Senator Raul Roco of Aksyon Demokratiko and President Arroyo. Eventually, Legarda and Vice President Teofisto Guingona Jr. left Lakas to join the opposition coalition Koalisyon ng Nagkakaisang Pilipino, with Legarda as the vice presidential running mate of actor Fernando Poe Jr.

Following Arroyo's victory over Poe and Senator Panfilo Lacson, Poe, her main rival, filed an electoral protest questioning the results. The protest also included Vice President Noli de Castro, Arroyo's running mate, whose victory was challenged by Legarda. Both poll protests were ultimately dismissed by the Supreme Court, sitting as the Presidential Electoral Tribunal.

Later, Arroyo became embroiled in controversy over the Hello Garci scandal, which stemmed from a leaked telephone conversation allegedly involving her and then-Commission on Elections commissioner Virgilio Garcillano during the 2004 elections.

At the onset of 2006, Lakas was torn by factional disputes between supporters of President Arroyo and those aligned with former president Ramos. The disagreements centered on the transitory provisions of a proposed Constitution, which included the scrapping of the 2007 midterm elections, commonly referred to as the "no-el" proposal, as well as calls for Arroyo to step down in time for the elections. To address these matters, the party convened its Annual Party Directorate Meeting in January 2006.

There are no official results available of the 2007 elections released by Lakas–CMD but according to the House of Representatives, the party held 79 out of 235 seats.

=== 2010 senatorial lineup ===
On January 16, 2008, Lakas–CMD spokesman and legal counsel Raul Lambino announced that Lakas had begun preparing its senatorial slate for 2010. Except for Parañaque Representative Eduardo Zialcita, the list was not yet finalized. However, Lambino named incumbent senators Bong Revilla and Lito Lapid, former senator Ralph Recto, and former representative Prospero Pichay as among those considered.

De Venecia resigned as president of Lakas on March 10, 2008, and rejected Ramos' proposal to name him chairman emeritus. On the same day, House Speaker Prospero Nograles and former Speaker Feliciano Belmonte Jr. were sworn in as party president and vice president for Metro Manila affairs, respectively.

==== Merger with KAMPI ====
On June 18, 2008, President Arroyo confirmed the historical merger of Lakas–CMD with the Kabalikat ng Malayang Pilipino. The merger adopted the principle of "equity of the incumbent",, as the unified force would account for almost 200 national officials and around 8,000 local officials, amid Arroyo's prediction of victory in the 2010 elections. Nograles and KAMPI Chairman Ronaldo Puno signed the covenant during regional party caucus in Davao City. Earlier, on February 6, 2008, Ramos, the party chairman-emeritus, announced that Lakas–CMD would remain the surviving entity after the merger.

On August 9, 2009, de Venecia and Ramos led fifty members from Lakas–Kampi–CMD in objecting to its merger with KAMPI. Their faction elected de Venecia as president and Ramos as chairman emeritus, although Ramos later declined the designation. De Venecia subsequently filed a resolution before COMELEC seeking to nullify the merger. However, the Supreme Court later upheld the legality of the merger, citing the failure of de Venecia "to sufficiently show that any grave abuse of discretion was committed by the Commission on Elections in rendering the challenged resolution."

== Ideology and branding ==
Lakas has always focused on economic growth and development, stronger ties with the United States, creation of jobs, and strong cooperation between the executive and legislative branches of government. It is known for its advocacy of a shift from the present presidential system to a parliamentary form of government through constitutional amendments and through establishing peace talks with Muslim separatists and communist rebels. The party democracy is distinct in its ecumenical inclusion of Muslim leaders in its political alliance.

Because of its association with the administration of President Corazon Aquino, party founder Ramos adopted yellow as the official party color in 1992. The color was especially prominent after Ramos and Lito Osmeña were endorsed by Aquino, who also used yellow in her campaign during the 1986 snap presidential election. Ramos also emphasized the party name "Lakas", originally derived from "Lakas ng Tao" ("People Power"), to highlight his role as a "hero" in the EDSA Revolution.

However, during the Arroyo administration, the party gradually became associated with powder blue, which was Arroyo's campaign color. The blue color has since remained the party's dominant hue.

== Electoral performance ==
=== Presidential election ===
Year	Presidential Candidate	Votes	%	Result	Outcome
1992	Fidel V. Ramos	5,342,521	23.58	Won	Fidel V. Ramos won
1998	Jose de Venecia Jr.	4,268,483	15.87	Lost	Joseph Estrada (LAMMP)
2004	Gloria Macapagal Arroyo	12,905,808	39.99	Won	Gloria Macapagal Arroyo won

=== Vice Presidential election ===
Year	Vice Presidential Candidate	Votes	%	Result	Outcome
1992	Lito Osmeña	3,362,467	16.47	Lost	Joseph Estrada (NPC) won
1998	Gloria Macapagal Arroyo	12,667,252	49.56	Won	Gloria Macapagal Arroyo won
2004	None; Arroyo's running mate was Noli de Castro (Independent)	15,100,431	49.80	Won	Noli de Castro (Independent) won

=== Legislative elections ===
Senate Election	Seats won	+/–	Result	President	House Seats	+/–	Result	House Election
1992	2 / 24	N/A	Majority	Fidel Ramos	41 / 216	N/A	Majority	1992 (Note: Does not include candidates who ran as under a Lakas–NUCD–UMDP ticket along with another party.)
1995 (Note: In coalition with Laban ng Demokratikong Pilipino.)	4 / 12	▲3	Majority	Fidel Ramos	100 / 220	▼59	Majority	1995
1998	5 / 12	▲4	Majority	Joseph Estrada	111 / 257	▲11	Minority	1998
2001	3 / 13	▼2	Majority	Gloria Macapagal Arroyo	73 / 256	▼10	Majority	2001
2004	4 / 12	▼3	Majority	Gloria Macapagal Arroyo	92 / 261	▲19	Majority	2004
2007	1 / 12	Steady	Majority	Gloria Macapagal Arroyo	89 / 271	▼3	Majority	2007

== Candidates for Philippine general elections ==
=== 1998 ===
==== For senator ====
Lakas fielded a complete slate for the 1998 Philippine Senate election, as it propelled the presidential and vice presidential candidacies of House Speaker Jose de Venecia Jr. and Senator Gloria Macapagal Arroyo, respectively, against the opposition coalition, Laban ng Makabayang Masang Pilipino (Struggle of Patriotic Filipino Masses), led by Vice President Joseph Estrada and Senator Edgardo Angara.

Name	Occupation
Lisandro Abadia	former Chief of Staff of the Armed Forces of the Philippines
Rolando Andaya Sr.	representative from Camarines Sur
Robert Barbers	former Secretary of the Interior and Local Government and retired police officer
Rene Cayetano	lawyer, former presidential legal adviser, television and radio personality
Roberto de Ocampo	former Secretary of Finance
Ricardo Gloria	former Secretary of Education, Culture and Sports
Teofisto Guingona Jr.	former Secretary of Justice
Loren Legarda	journalist, television personality
Roberto Pagdanganan	Governor of Bulacan
Hernando Perez	representative from Batangas
Nina Rasul	former senator
Ramon Revilla Sr.	senator

Lakas gained 5 out of 12 possible senate seats, namely (in order of votes received):

- Loren Legarda
- Rene Cayetano
- Robert Barbers
- Ramon Revilla Sr.
- Teofisto Guingona Jr. (appointed vice president in 2001)

== Coalitions ==
Lakas–CMD had coalesced with other parties in the past elections, enabling it to strengthen its political power both in the national and local levels:

- Lakas–Kampi–CMD, the dominant majority party in the 2010 Philippine general election.
- TEAM Unity, the pro-Arroyo coalition in the 2007 Philippine general election.
- Koalisyon ng Katapatan at Karanasan sa Kinabukasan, the pro-Arroyo coalition in the 2004 Philippine general election.
- People Power Coalition, the pro-Arroyo coalition in the 2001 Philippine general election.
- Lakas–Laban Coalition, the pro-Ramos coalition in the 1995 Philippine general election.

== Notable members ==
=== Presidents ===
- Fidel V. Ramos (12th President of the Philippines; party chairman-emeritus and former party chairman; co-founder)
- Gloria Macapagal Arroyo (14th President of the Philippines; party chairperson)

=== Senators ===
- Bong Revilla (former party chairman)
- Teofisto Guingona Jr. (Vice President of the Philippines)
- Raul Manglapus (co-founder)
- Loren Legarda
- Leticia Ramos-Shahani
- Ramon Magsaysay Jr.
- Franklin Drilon
- Serge Osmeña
- Robert Barbers
- Rene Cayetano
- Ramon Revilla Sr.
- Robert Jaworski
- Joker Arroyo
- Ralph Recto
- Juan Flavier (Secretary of Health)
- Lito Lapid
- Pia Cayetano
- Dick Gordon

=== Members of Congress ===
- Martin Romualdez (Representative, Leyte's 1st district; current party president)
- Jose de Venecia Jr. (Speaker of the House of Representatives; former party president and co-founder)

=== Government officials ===
- Eduardo Ermita (executive secretary)

== Party leadership ==
=== President ===
President	Term start	Term end
Raul Manglapus	1991	1998
Teofisto Guingona Jr.	1998	October 8, 2003
Jose de Venecia Jr.	October 8, 2003	2008

=== Chairperson ===
Chairperson	Term start	Term end
Jose de Venecia Jr.	1991	May 2002
Gloria Macapagal Arroyo	May 2002	2008

== See also ==
- Lakas–CMD, the current party which was formed through merger with now-defunct Kabalikat ng Malayang Pilipino
- Partido para sa Demokratikong Reporma, a breakaway party formed by Renato de Villa
