= Marcelo Fernan =

Chief Justice of the Philippines from 1988 to 1991

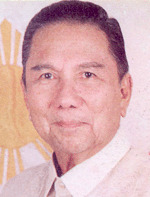

20th President of the Senate of the Philippines
- In office July 27, 1998 – June 28, 1999
- Preceded by: Neptali Gonzales
- Succeeded by: Blas Ople

20th Chief Justice of the Supreme Court of the Philippines
- In office July 1, 1988 – December 6, 1991
- Nominated by: Corazon Aquino
- Preceded by: Pedro Yap
- Succeeded by: Andres Narvasa

111th Associate Justice of the Supreme Court of the Philippines
- In office April 9, 1986 – June 30, 1988
- Nominated by: Corazon Aquino
- Preceded by: Lorenzo Relova
- Succeeded by: Florenz Regalado

Senator of the Philippines
- In office June 30, 1995 – July 11, 1999

Member of Regular Batasang Pambansa from Cebu City
- In office June 30, 1984 – March 25, 1986 Serving with Antonio Cuenco

Member of the Cebu Provincial Board
- In office December 30, 1959 – December 30, 1961

Personal details
- Born: Marcelo Briones Fernan; October 24, 1927 Cebu, Cebu, Philippine Islands
- Died: July 11, 1999 (aged 71) Manila, Philippines
- Party: LDP (1991–1999)
- Other political affiliations: UNIDO (1984–1986); Panaghiusa (1984)
- Spouse: Eloisa Nolasco (m. 1955)
- Relations: Manuel Briones (uncle); Matteo Guidicelli (grand-nephew); Sarah Geronimo (great-niece-in-law)
- Children: 9
- Education: University of the Philippines Diliman (LL.B); Harvard University (LL.M)

Marcelo "Celing" Briones Fernan (October 24, 1927 – July 11, 1999) was a Filipino lawyer and political figure. He is the only Filipino to have served as both Chief Justice of the Supreme Court and as Senate President. He is also the third Filipino to have headed both the judicial and legislative branches of government, after Querube Makalintal who served as Chief Justice and Speaker of the Batasang Pambansa in the 1970s, and José Yulo, who served as Chief Justice and Speaker of the House of Representatives before 1946.

== Early life ==
Fernan was born in Cebu, Cebu in 1927. In 1953, he graduated with a degree in law from the University of the Philippines College of Law. He went to Harvard University in the United States to obtain his master's degree. He returned to the Philippines soon after to finally serve his profession as a lawyer, particularly in his home province. Soon, he became a litigator, a trial court lawyer.

== Career ==
=== Early legislative career ===
In 1959, he was elected to the Cebu Provincial Board and served until 1961. He was also elected to the 1971 Constitutional Convention as a delegate from his home province and actively participated in its sessions, and committee meetings/hearings for the formulation of a new Constitution for the country then. In 1984, during the Marcos regime, he was elected to the Regular Batasang Pambansa, then the country's unicameral parliament with Antonio Cuenco, representing the at-large district of Cebu City under the banner of the opposition UNIDO party and actively scrutinized the bills presented by the administration lawmakers and delivered privilege speeches against the Marcos regime. In 1986, after the snap elections, he was one of the opposition lawmakers who walked out when the administration lawmakers after a canvassing session that was then filled with debates and tensions, proclaimed then President Ferdinand E. Marcos and his running mate, then former Senator Arturo Tolentino as the winners of that year's snap presidential and vice presidential polls in which the opposition claimed was marred with fraud.

=== Judicial ===
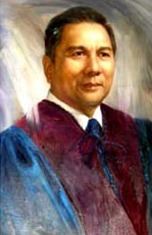
Official Portrait as Chief Justice

In 1977, he was elected national president of the Integrated Bar of the Philippines, the country's national organization of lawyers.

After the People Power Revolution and the dissolution of the Batasang Pambansa, he was appointed by President Corazon Aquino as an Associate Justice of the Supreme Court and served until 1988 and acted also as Chairman of the Supreme Court Committee on the Revision of the Rules of Court and Chairman of the House Electoral Tribunal.

He was then promoted in 1988 as Chief Justice, the highest position of leadership in the Supreme Court and the judiciary and was Chairman of the Judicial and Bar Council, the country's screening body of the potential judges and justices and the Judiciary Planning and Implementation Office. During his term as Chief Justice, several bold judicial reforms were instituted, among them the judicial orientation and career enrichment program, updating of the Code of Judicial Conduct and the continuous trial program.

=== Vice Presidential bid ===
He resigned as Chief Justice in 1991 to run as president of the country. He later accepted the offer of House Speaker Ramon Mitra as his vice presidential candidate of the Laban ng Demokratikong Pilipino. He was the first former Chief Justice to run for vice president. In the 1992 elections, however both lost to Fidel Ramos and Joseph Estrada, respectively.

=== Senate and Senate Presidency ===
In the 1995 elections, Fernan ran for the Senate under the Lakas–Laban coalition and was elected, his fourth time entrance in politics and was named as the Assistant Majority Leader and Chairman of the Senate Committee on Justice and Human Rights as well as the Chairman of the Senate Committee on Labor, Employment and Human Resources Development for the Tenth Congress (1995-1998) and authored several significant bills that became laws of the country, among these are: Republic Act No. 8246 or the Court of Appeals Regionalization Act, RA 8493 or the Speedy Trial Act of 1998, RA 8557 or the Philippine Judicial Academy, RA 8525 or the Adopt-a-School Act of 1997 and RA 8558 or the Underground Mine Workers Act.

He also sponsored RA 8247 or the Alien Social Integration Act of 1995. RA 8282 or the Social Security Act of 1997, and RA 8369 or the Family Courts Acts of 1997.

Fernan was elected Senate President, the top post of leadership in the Senate, and concurrently, the Chairman of the Commission on Appointments, a congressional body tasked to scrutinize and confirm presidential appointments at the opening of the 11th Congress in 1998. Under his leadership as Senate President, the Senate passed the Clean Air Act, the Visiting Force Agreement and the General Appropriations Act of 1999 and other various laws.

== Death ==
Fernan resigned the Senate presidency on June 28, 1999, due to failing health. He was succeeded in his position by Senate President pro tempore, Blas Ople. Fernan became an ordinary senator and attended committee hearings and meetings and plenary sessions even in a wheelchair but died of cancer days later, on July 11 in Manila. He was buried in Cebu City. The Marcelo Fernan Bridge, the second bridge that connects Mandaue City to Mactan Island, was named after him.

== Personal life ==
He was married to Eloisa Nolasco in 1955, having 9 children and 18 grandchildren. His son Marcelo Fernan Jr. served as the Presidential Assistant for Central Visayas under President Joseph Estrada from 1998 to 2001. One daughter, Milagros Fernan-Cayosa became a member of the Judicial and Bar Council from 2011 to 2019. He is also a grand-uncle to TV and movie personality Matteo Guidicelli.

== Trivia ==
He is the only Filipino who has headed both the Judiciary as Chief Justice and Legislative Branch as Senate President. For weekends, he loved bringing his family to the beaches in Mactan, Cebu and Bogo to snorkel or to ride a pump boat to visit nearby islands. Marcelo Fernan loved to sing and among his favorite songs were "Feelings" and "Matud Nila".

== Electoral history ==
Electoral history of Marcelo Fernan
Year	Office	Party	Votes received				Result
Year	Office	Party	Total	%	P.	Swing	Result
1959	Board Member (Cebu)	Unknown	—N/a	—N/a	—N/a	—N/a	Won
1970	Constitutional Convention Delegate (Cebu–2nd)	Nonpartisan	—N/a	—N/a	—N/a	—N/a	Won
1984	Assemblyman (Cebu City)	Panaghiusa	155,156	19.85%	1st	—N/a	Won
1992	Vice President of the Philippines	LDP	4,438,494	21.74%	2nd	—N/a	Lost
1995	Senator of the Philippines	LDP	8,762,235	34.05%	10th	—N/a	Won

== See also ==
- List of Philippine legislators who died in office

Senate of the Philippines
Preceded by Neptali Gonzales	President of the Senate; 1998–1999	Succeeded by Blas F. Ople
Legal offices
Preceded by Pedro Yap	Chief Justice of the Supreme Court of the Philippines; 1988–1991	Succeeded by Andres Narvasa
Preceded by Lorenzo Relova	Associate Justice of the Supreme Court of the Philippines; 1986–1988	Succeeded by Florenz D. Regalado
