= Nene Pimentel =

President of the Senate of the Philippines from 2000 to 2001

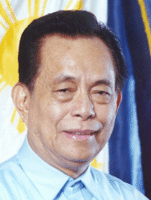

23rd President of the Senate of the Philippines
- In office November 13, 2000 – June 30, 2001
- Preceded by: Franklin Drilon
- Succeeded by: Franklin Drilon

Senate Majority Leader
- In office June 3, 2002 – July 23, 2002
- Preceded by: Loren Legarda
- Succeeded by: Loren Legarda

Senate Minority Leader
- In office July 26, 2004 – June 30, 2010
- Preceded by: Vicente Sotto III
- Succeeded by: Alan Peter Cayetano
- In office July 23, 2001 – June 3, 2002
- Preceded by: Tito Guingona
- Succeeded by: Vicente Sotto III

Senator of the Philippines
- In office June 30, 1998 – June 30, 2010
- In office June 30, 1987 – June 30, 1992

Minister/Secretary of the Interior and Local Government
- In office February 25, 1986 – December 7, 1986
- President: Corazon Aquino
- Preceded by: Jose Roño
- Succeeded by: Jaime Ferrer

Member of the Regular Batasang Pambansa from Cagayan de Oro
- In office June 30, 1984 – March 25, 1986

8th Mayor of Cagayan de Oro
- In office March 3, 1980 – June 30, 1984
- Vice Mayor: Pablo P. Magtajas
- Preceded by: Pedro N. Roa
- Succeeded by: Pablo P. Magtajas

Personal details
- Born: Aquilino Quilinging Pimentel Jr. December 11, 1933 Claveria, Misamis Oriental, Philippine Islands
- Died: October 20, 2019 (aged 85) Metro Manila, Philippines
- Resting place: The Heritage Park, Taguig, Metro Manila, Philippines
- Party: PDP/PDP–Laban (1982–2019)
- Other political affiliations: Laban (1978–1982); Liberal (before 1978)
- Spouse: Lourdes de la Llana (m. 1960)
- Children: 6, including Aquilino Martin III
- Parents: Aquilino E. Pimentel Sr.; Petra Quilinging Pimentel
- Education: Xavier University – Ateneo de Cagayan
- Occupation: Politician, Civil servant

Aquilino Quilinging Pimentel Jr. (Tagalog pronunciation: [pimenˈtel], December 11, 1933 – October 20, 2019), commonly known as Nene Pimentel, was a Filipino politician and human rights lawyer who was one of the leading political opposition leaders during the regime of Ferdinand Marcos from the declaration of martial law in 1972 until the People Power Revolution in 1986, which removed Marcos from power. He co-founded the Partido Demokratiko Pilipino–Lakas ng Bayan (PDP–Laban) and served as the President of the Senate of the Philippines from 2000 to 2001. He is the father of former Senator Aquilino Pimentel III. In 2018, Pimentel was identified by the Human Rights Victims' Claims Board as a Motu Proprio human rights violations victim of the Martial Law Era.

== Early life ==
Nene Pimentel was born on December 11, 1933, to Aquilino "Aquio" E. Pimentel Sr. (January 4, 1909 – November 8, 1987), a lawyer from Cagayan de Oro, and Petra Quilinging (July 27, 1911 – May 11, 1956), a public school teacher from Batac, Ilocos Norte. He married Lourdes "Bing" de la Llana on April 30, 1960, and they had six children, including Aquilino Pimentel III.

== Political career ==
=== Delegate to the 1971 Constitutional Convention ===
In 1971, Pimentel rose to national prominence as an elected delegate to the Constitutional Convention of 1971, representing Misamis Oriental. The nature of the Constitutional Convention changed when then-President Ferdinand Marcos declared martial law on September 21, 1972. Pimentel and a few like-minded delegates feared the Constitutional Convention would produce a Marcos-scripted Constitution and were vocal in their opposition. Pimentel also protested certain provisions as being contrary to the people's interest. In the subsequent roundup of those who opposed Marcos, he was arrested in early 1973 and jailed for three months at Camp Crame. Pimentel, who had a young family, bade his wife Bing "Be brave. Don’t cry," and submitted to the incarceration. He was released from prison in time for the signing of the Constitution. Along with a few other delegates, Pimentel refused to sign the Constitution.

He then went to work as a lawyer for the National Secretariat for Social Action of the Catholic Bishops Conference.

=== 1978 interim Batasang Pambansa elections ===
In April 1978, Pimentel ran for a post in the Interim Batasan elections as an official candidate of the Laban party of Metro Manila with Benigno S. Aquino Jr. Members of Marcos's KBL party swept the seats, with largely unknown KBL candidates defeating popular candidates such as Aquino. Pimentel and other opposition leaders like Senator Lorenzo Tañada, Francisco Soc Rodrigo, Tito Guingona, Archie Intengan SJ, and Chino Roces protested the massive cheating that had taken place in the elections. Pimentel was one of those arrested for leading a demonstration against what he termed farcical elections. He had spoken out against Marcos's bid to produce a rubber stamp legislature to win legitimacy for his iron-fisted regime that was increasingly being criticized here and abroad. Pimentel was jailed for two months in Camp Bicutan in Taguig, Metro Manila.

Pimentel's second stint in prison did not silence him. In fact, it strengthened his resolve to fight for freedom and to oppose electoral fraud. Ever the parliamentarian, he brought the battle from the streets to the polls in January 1980 when Marcos allowed local elections.

=== Mayor of Cagayan de Oro ===
His wife Bing recalled they launched his mayoralty bid in Cagayan de Oro with a mere ₱2,000 in his war chest – all the money the couple could muster. But Cagayanons who believed in him contributed to his campaign and penned his name on their ballot. Pimentel won by a 3–1 margin over his KBL rival, who was fielded by Marcos. Pimentel ran under the coalition banner of the National Union for Democracy and Freedom and the Mindanao Alliance which busted KBL dominance in Misamis Oriental. He and his entire slate of candidates for vice mayor and seven city councilors swept the elections in Cagayan de Oro. His candidates for governor and vice governor also won.

Pimentel was not to govern his city unhindered. In 1981, while he was on a five-week training course in the United States, the COMELEC ousted him for "political turncoatism", installing the KBL candidate as mayor. The COMELEC cited Pimentel for switching from Laban in April 1978 to the National Union for Democracy and Freedom in December 1979 and then running as candidate of the Mindanao Alliance in January 1980.

The COMELEC's move ired the Cagayanons. Pimentel partisans immediately staged peaceful demonstrations to express their displeasure. About 30 of his supporters also started fasting in protest. Six days later, 10,000 of his supporters marched around the city in a nonviolent show of support for Pimentel who was then on an official trip to the US. Thousands more lined the streets to cheer them on. This first-ever demonstration of "People Power" came at a time when Marcos did not lightly tolerate dissent.

Meanwhile, in Manila, Pimentel's lawyer, headed by opposition leaders former senators Lorenzo Tañada and Soc Rodrigo, along with Abraham Sarmiento, Raul Gonzales and Joker Arroyo, claimed that the COMELEC had acted without jurisdiction and contented that the electorate's will should be respected. The COMELEC, however, reaffirmed its decision to oust Pimentel.

The conflict made national headlines and photos of demonstrations in Cagayan de Oro appeared in a major daily. To defuse the escalating turmoil, Marcos engineered a truce and reinstalled Pimentel as mayor, pending a Supreme Court decision. Pimentel arrived from the US in time to pick up the reins of city government that had briefly been wrested from him.

In 1983, while he was in Cebu City, Pimentel was arrested on charges of rebellion and was detained. He had allegedly given P100 to New People's Army commander. Bing Pimentel recalled it was horrible time as the family did not know where he was. They traced him to Camp Sergio Osmeña and later to Camp Cabahug in the City of Cebu. Even as he was held in the military detention centers, his followers from Cagayan de Oro and other parts of the country visited him by the hundreds to boost his morale and keep his spirits high.

Nene Pimentel disputed the charges and was later released. Returning home, he was mobbed by thousand of his supporters upon his arrival at the pier of Cagayan de Oro. Later, he was again arrested for allegedly engaging in ambuscades. His supporters contributed centavos and pesos in small denomination to bail him out. Subsequently, Pimentel was placed under house arrest which lasted for almost seven months.

=== Assemblyman for Batasang Pambansa ===
From the confines of his home, Pimentel continued to keep abreast of national news. He helped rally the opposition, ran the city and launched his bid as assemblyman for the Batasang Pambansa. He was, if anything, not quiet. He protested relentlessly and fearlessly against injustice, fraud, corruption and Marcos' dictatorial rule.

Then, in the aftermath of the assassination of Marcos's chief rival, Benigno "Ninoy" Aquino Jr. in 1983, Pimentel won a seat in the 1984 Philippine parliamentary election, but the Marcos government ousted him on the allegation that he had cheated in the elections. The Supreme Court itself recounted the ballots in an electoral contest.

The feisty Pimentel, a relentless critic of the Marcos regime, was often seen with Ninoy's widow, Cory, as they rallied the opposition. At one point, Cory asked him to be her running mate in the 1986 Philippine presidential election and he agreed. However, when Cardinal Jaime Sin brokered a political marriage between Cory and Salvador "Doy" Laurel, Pimentel graciously stepped aside and let history run its course.

Upon her ascent to power after the People Power Revolution, President Aquino appointed Pimentel as Minister of Local Government. He had the unenviable task of dismantling the structure of dictatorship and corruption left behind by the Marcos regime. Pimentel wielded the axe deliberately, gaining a breathing space for the new administration. His critics alleged he had sold positions in the new government, but none could make the charge stick. Pimentel incurred the ire of some but also the respect of those who saw that he did it without fear or favor or taint of corruption.

=== First term as senator (1987–1992) ===
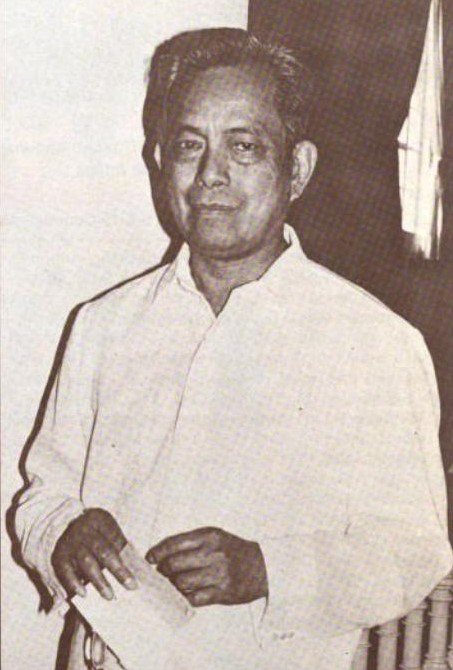
Pimentel as a senator, photograph released by the Philippine Congress, c. 1988

Pimentel then was elected Senator in 1987, finishing 20th, serving a five-year term until 1992. He authored the seminal Local Government Code of 1991. As Senator, he authored and sponsored several key pieces of legislation, among them the Local Government Code of 1991, the Cooperative Code, the Philippine Sports Commission Act, the Act Creating the Autonomous Region in Muslim Mindanao, and the People's Small-Scale Mining Act. He also authored and co-sponsored the Generic Drugs Act and the Act Establishing the Philippine Police under a Reorganized Department of Interior and Local Government.

On November 24, 1990, Pimentel was riding a six-seater plane to Naga City to deliver a speech on the proposed Local Government Code when an engine malfunctioned during the plane's descent in stormy weather, but the pilot, Capt. Edgardo Lopez, was able to maneuver around a mountain and land safely at Naga Airport. On September 16, 1991, Pimentel was among the "Magnificent 12" senators who voted against the extension of the PH-US Bases Treaty.

He also authored the RA 6975, or the DILG Act that created the civilian Philippine National Police.

=== Vice-presidential bid; 1995 attempt to return to the Senate (1992–1998) ===
Pimentel then launched a bid for the vice presidency in 1992, running under the Liberal Party–PDP–Laban coalition with Jovito Salonga running for president. However, he lost to fellow Senator Joseph Estrada, finishing fifth among the vice presidential candidates by garnering 9.9% of the vote.

Pimentel was defeated in the 1995 national elections after running for another term for the Senate placing on number 15. He then took the case to the Supreme Court eventually winning the suit in 2004.

=== Return to the Senate (1998–2010) ===
In 1998, Pimentel ran successfully for another term in the Senate of the Philippines, from 1998 to 2004. Along with Edgardo Angara and Juan Ponce Enrile, Pimentel is one of the three senators elected in 1987 to return to the Senate.

In May 2003, Pimentel and congresswoman Etta Rosales filed a petition before the Supreme Court to compel the executive branch in transmitting the Rome Statute to the Senate in order to ratify the Philippines' membership in the International Criminal Court; it was later dismissed in July 2005.

He was re-elected in the May 10, 2004 national elections, attaining the third-highest number of votes of nearly 80 candidates for the 12 Senate seats.

During his term at the Senate, Pimentel authored several bills and resolutions, some of which have already been enacted into law:

- R.A. No.7160, The Local Government Code in 1991
- R.A. No. 6938, The Cooperative Code
- R.A. No. 6678, The Generic Drugs Act
- R.A. No. 6734, An Act Creating the Autonomous Region in Muslim Mindanao

==== Senate President (2000–2001) ====
In October 2000, Senate President Franklin Drilon issued a statement about the Juetengate scandal of President Joseph Estrada. Drilon was removed as Senate President the next month through a Senate revamp and Pimentel was installed as Senate President. In December 2000, an impeachment case was filed on the Senate. On January 16, 2001, Pimentel was one of those who voted in favor of the opening of the second bank envelope. Their vote was outnumbered and some of the opposition senators cried in front of Senate President Pimentel. Joseph Estrada was ousted in January by the second EDSA People Power Revolution, but he was pardoned by his successor, Gloria Macapagal Arroyo on October 26, 2007. Pimentel occupied the Senate presidency until the end of the regular session in June 2001. As he explained his vote to open he declared:

I vote to do so because that is the only way to determine whether or not the contents of the envelope are relevant or material to the case at bar. Because of this development, Mr. Chief Justice, I realize that the NO’s have it. And therefore, I resign my presidency of the Senate as soon as my successor is elected.

Before stepping down as senator, Pimentel made a final privilege speech, where he demanded the American government and the Field Museum of Natural History in Chicago to return to the Philippines the Golden Tara, one of the most significant artifacts in the entire country which landed in American possession during the financial crisis in the Philippines.

==== Blue Ribbon Committee Chair ====
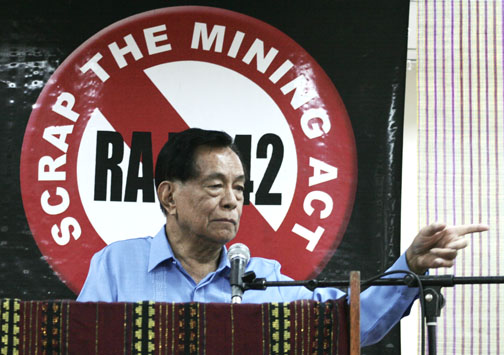
Senate President Aquilino Pimentel (2000-2001)

As chair of the Blue Ribbon Committee, he has recommended the prosecution of top government officials of previous administrations in relation to the Expo Pilipino centennial scam and the misuse of the funds of the Retirement and Separation Benefits Systems of the Armed Forces. He has also recommended the prosecution of certain personnel of the Land Registration Administration for involvement in faking of land titles. Recently his committee also conducted series of investigations into the allegation of Governor Luis "Chavit" Singson on jueteng scandal. As Chair of the Committee on Local Government, he has supported far-reaching amendments to further strengthen the role of local government units in national development. He has also gotten senate approval to return the police to the supervision of LGUs and has authored a law to fix the date for elections of ARMM officials.

He was the president and founder of the PDP–Laban party. On April 25, 2008, Senator Pimentel authored a bill that would shift the Philippines into a Federal Republic of the Philippines.

== Post-Senate career ==
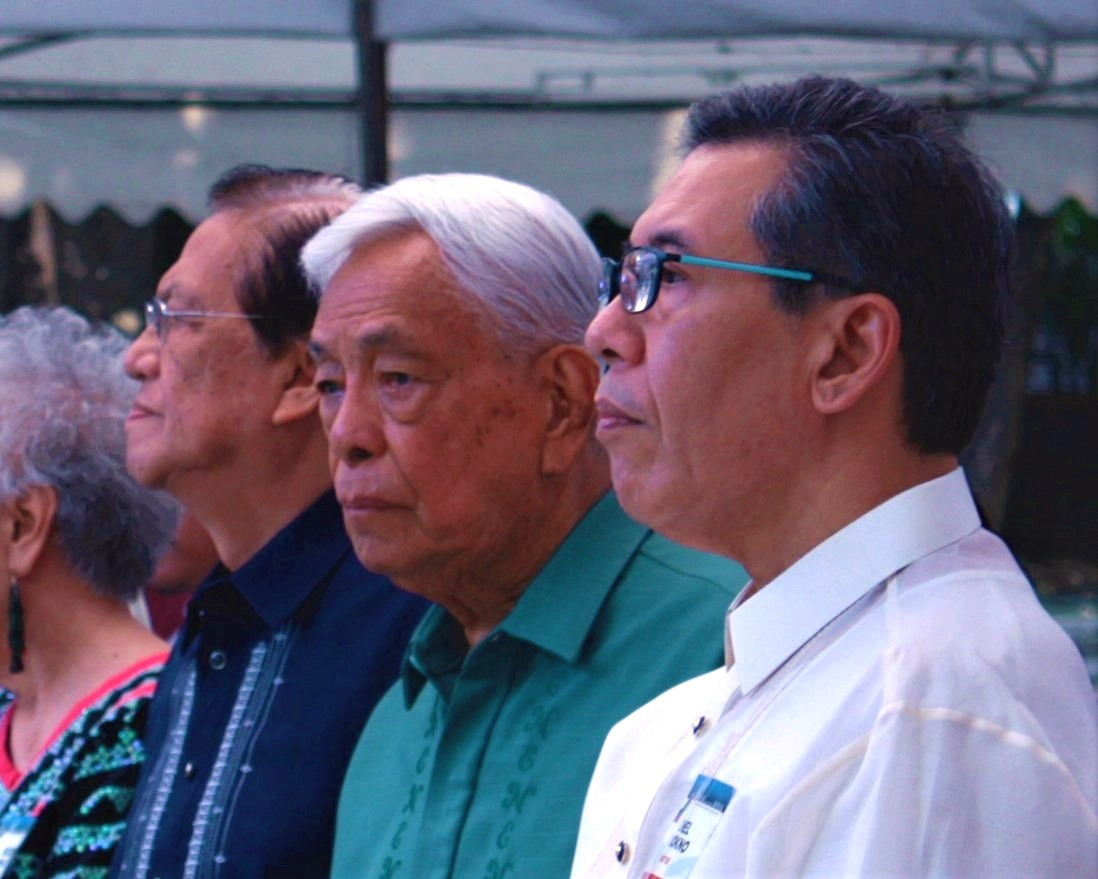
Wigberto Tañada, Nene Pimentel, and Chel Diokno at the 2018 Honoring of Martyrs and Heroes at the Bantayog ng mga Bayani on November 30, 2018

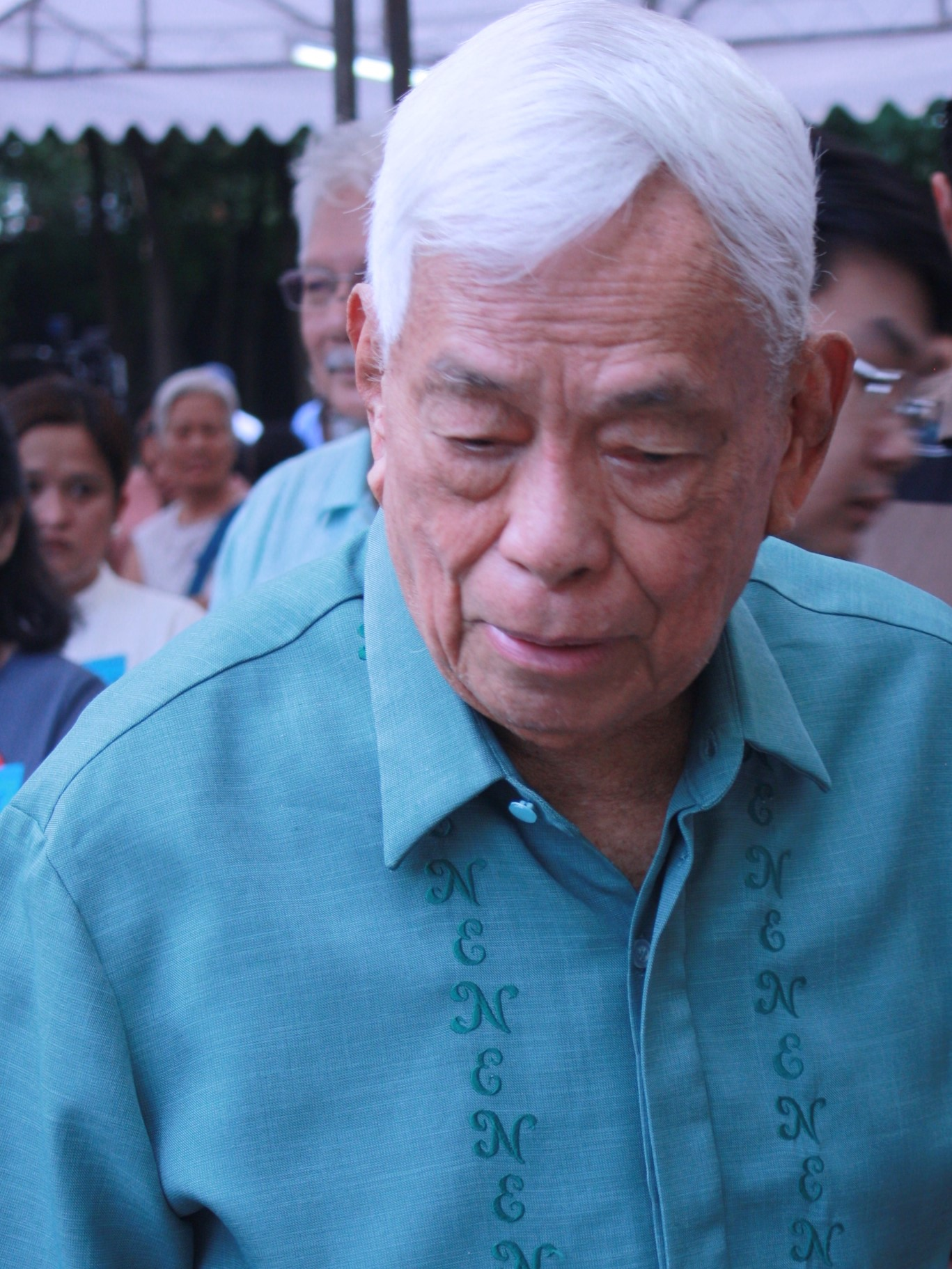
Pimentel at the Bantayog ng mga Bayani in November 2018

Nene Pimentel left office on June 30, 2010, after serving three Senate terms and briefly as Senate President.

Pimentel remained active in political life, taking on the role of elder statesman - continuing to criticise authoritarianism, human rights violations, and the Marcoses.

Nene Pimentel was a proponent of federalism in the Philippines. He has proposed 5 states in Luzon (North Luzon, Cordillera, Central Luzon, Southern Tagalog, and Bicol), 1 federal capital (Metro Manila), 4 states in Visayas (East Visayas, Central Visayas, Western Visayas, and Minparom), and 3-4 states in Mindanao (Bangsamoro, Southern Mindanao, and Northern Mindanao - which may be divided into Northeast Mindanao and Northwest Mindanao). He also proposed the establishment of two autonomous regions within the proposed Bangsamoro federal state, as the Muslims of the Sulu archipelago do not want to be lumped with the Muslims of mainland Mindanao due to their distinct culture.

== Politically active descendants ==
His son Aquilino "Koko" Pimentel III ran for senator in 2007. In 2010, his daughter Gwen made a senatorial race attempt under the Nacionalista Party coalition and a member of the PDP–Laban.

The following year, Koko was proclaimed senator after Migz Zubiri resigned from the Senate. He got his full term in 2013 under Team PNoy. He then served as Senate President from 2016 to 2018. Nene supported President Rodrigo Duterte during the election campaign.

== Death ==
On October 14, 2019, Pimentel was admitted to the intensive care unit of an undisclosed hospital in Metro Manila. His daughter, Gwendolyn, reported that he was experiencing difficulty in breathing due to pneumonia. A family statement described that Pimentel was "very ill".

On October 20, his son, Senator Koko Pimentel, announced that his father had died at around 5 a.m. (PST) due to complications from lymphoma. He was 85 and two months shy of his 86th birthday. The elder Pimentel's wake was held at the Heritage Memorial Park in Taguig from October 20 to 22 and from October 25 to 26, at the Senate of the Philippines session hall on October 23, and at the Cagayan De Oro City Hall from October 23 to 25. His remains were laid to rest at The Heritage Park in Taguig on October 26.

== Electoral history ==
Electoral history of Nene Pimentel
Year	Office	Party	Votes received				Result
Year	Office	Party	Total	%	P.	Swing	Result
1970	Constitutional Convention Delegate (Misamis Oriental)	Nonpartisan	—N/a	—N/a	—N/a	—N/a	Won
1978	Assemblyman (Region IV)	LABAN	948,725	1.71%	35th	—N/a	Lost
1980	Mayor of Cagayan de Oro	LABAN	—N/a	—N/a	1st	—N/a	Won
1984	Assemblyman (Cagayan de Oro)	PDP–Laban	64,758	50.65%	1st	—N/a	Won
1987	Senator of the Philippines	PDP–Laban	9,042,696	39.77%	20th	—N/a	Won
1995	Senator of the Philippines	PDP–Laban	8,522,148	33.11%	15th	−6.66	Lost
1998	Senator of the Philippines	PDP–Laban	10,227,765	34.92%	4th	+1.81	Won
2004	Senator of the Philippines	PDP–Laban	13,519,998	38.07%	3rd	+3.15	Won
1992	Vice President of the Philippines	PDP–Laban	2,023,289	9.91%	5th	—N/a	Lost

== Notes ==
House of Representatives of the Philippines
New district	Assemblyman of Cagayan de Oro's at-large congressional district 1984–1986	Succeeded by Benedicta Roa as Representative
Political offices
Preceded by Pedro Roa	Mayor of Cagayan de Oro; 1980–1984	Succeeded by Pablo Magtajas
Preceded by Jose Roño	Minister/Secretary of Interior and Local Government; 1986	Succeeded by Jaime Ferrer
Senate of the Philippines
Preceded by Franklin Drilon	President of the Senate of the Philippines; 2000–2001	Succeeded by Franklin Drilon
Preceded by Teofisto Guingona Jr.	Minority Floor Leader; 2001–2002	Succeeded by Tito Sotto
Preceded by Loren Legarda	Majority Floor Leader; 2002	Succeeded by Loren Legarda
Preceded by Tito Sotto	Minority Floor Leader; 2004–2010	Succeeded by Alan Peter Cayetano
Party political offices
New political party	Chairman of PDP–Laban; 1982–2010 (as Partido Demokratiko Pilipino until 1986)	Succeeded by Jejomar Binay
First	PDP–Laban nominee for Vice President of the Philippines; 1992	Vacant Title next held by Jejomar Binay
