= Francisco Tatad =

Filipino journalist and politician

The Honorable Francisco S. Tatad
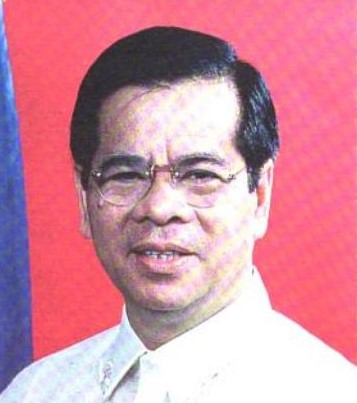
- Official portrait, 1997

Senator of the Philippines
- In office June 30, 1992 – June 30, 2001

Senate Majority Leader
- In office April 12, 2000 – June 30, 2001
- Preceded by: Franklin Drilon
- Succeeded by: Loren Legarda
- In office October 10, 1996 – January 26, 1998
- Preceded by: Alberto Romulo
- Succeeded by: Franklin Drilon

Minister of Public Information
- In office December 1969 – February 1980
- President: Ferdinand Marcos
- Preceded by: Jose Aspiras (Press Secretary)
- Succeeded by: Gregorio Cendaña

Mambabatas Pambansa (Assemblyman) from Region V
- In office June 12, 1978 – June 5, 1984

Personal details
- Born: October 4, 1939 (age 87) Gigmoto, Albay, Philippine Commonwealth (now Gigmoto, Catanduanes, Philippines)
- Party: Independent (2009–present)
- Other political affiliations: PMP (2004–2009); Gabay Bayan (1997–2004); LDP (1994–1997); NPC (1992–1993); GAD (1987–1994); KBL (1978–1987); Nacionalista (until 1978)
- Spouse: Fernandita "Fenny" Cantero
- Relations: Shalani Soledad (niece)
- Education: University of Santo Tomas; Center for Research and Communication
- Profession: Journalist, politician

Francisco "Kit" Sarmiento Tatad (born October 4, 1939) is a Filipino journalist and politician best known for having served as Minister of Public Information under President Ferdinand Marcos Sr. from 1969 to 1980, and for serving as a Senator of the Philippines from 1992 to 2001.

On September 23, 1972, Tatad gave the first televised announcement of nationwide martial law prior to President Marcos' own address a few hours later. After falling out with Marcos in 1979, Tatad became a critic of his regime. In January 2001, during the impeachment trial of President Joseph Estrada, Senator Tatad introduced the motion to vote on disclosing information about Estrada, resulting in a narrow vote against it and the prosecution's walkout, which lead to the Second EDSA Revolution.

== Career ==
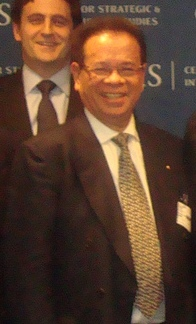
Tatad in 2011

=== Marcos regime ===
Upon his appointment as minister of public information by President Ferdinand Marcos, Tatad became the youngest member of Marcos' cabinet. During his term, he announced the declaration of martial law on September 23, 1972, just hours before Marcos himself came on the air. In March 1973, he called on entertainment journalists to encourage the film industry to produce quality films that also promoted values of the New Society. While serving as cabinet secretary, he concurrently became a member of the Batasang Pambansa beginning in 1978. In 1979, Tatad had a falling-out with Marcos, with the latter removing him as public information minister in February 1980 and appointing Gregorio Cendaña in his place.

In January 1984, Tatad attended the two-day assembly of the Kongreso ng Mamamayang Pilipino (KOMPIL), an initiative chaired by Butz Aquino that sought to unite the various opposition groups. During the assembly, delegates gathered at the Ateneo de Manila University gymnasium in Quezon City for a forum on who could replace President Marcos if he resigns, with Tatad representing the Nacionalista Party.

=== Fifth Republic ===
Tatad was elected senator under the Nationalist People's Coalition in 1992 for a three-year term. In June 1994, he joined the Laban ng Demokratikong Pilipino (LDP) political party, and by 1995 was reelected senator, this time to a six-year term. During his service in the Senate, he served as Majority Floor Leader from 1996 to 1998 and again from 2000 to 2001, and had filed legislation that countered the liberalization policies being implemented by the Fidel V. Ramos administration. In October 1997, Tatad left the LDP upon its merger into the Laban ng Makabayang Masang Pilipino (LAMMP) coalition, having rejected out of principle LAMMP's endorsement of Vice President Joseph Estrada as presidential candidate in the 1998 election. By December 1997, Tatad founded Gabay Bayan, the official successor of the Grand Alliance for Democracy, upon announcing his candidacy for president. In February 1998, Tatad was reported to have expressed openness in running for the vice presidency instead in becoming the running mate of Lito Osmeña, but eventually ran as the running mate of Senator Miriam Defensor Santiago. During their campaign, Tatad and Santiago criticized the "hasty implementation" of liberalization policies under the Ramos administration. Both Tatad and Santiago respectively lost the presidential election to Senator Gloria Macapagal Arroyo and Vice President Joseph Estrada.

By 1999, Senator Tatad had reversed his opposition to President Estrada and was serving as his political ally. On January 16, 2001, during the impeachment trial of President Estrada, Tatad preempted Chief Justice Hilario Davide Jr.'s decision to open an envelope of bank documents, alleged to contain incriminating evidence against President Estrada, by introducing a motion for the Senate to vote on it instead, with him joining 10 other senators in voting against it. The resulting narrow vote against opening the envelope led to a walkout by the prosecution, inciting the Second EDSA Revolution which ousted Estrada from office.

Tatad ran again for senator under the Koalisyon ng Nagkakaisang Pilipino of actor Fernando Poe Jr. in 2004 but lost. In 2007, he resigned from the governing board of the United Opposition as a protest against the party's decision to draft Alan Peter Cayetano, JV Ejercito and Aquilino Pimentel III as its senatorial candidates due to issues of "dynasty-building", as the three had relatives already serving in the Senate. In 2010, he ran again for senator but lost, finishing only in the 27th place.

During the hearing on the impeachment of Chief Justice Renato Corona on January 19, 2012, Tatad had a verbal confrontation with Senator-Judge Franklin Drilon, accusing him of acting like a part of the prosecution team. Drilon allegedly challenged him to disqualify him from participating in the proceedings.

== Political views ==
As a lay member of the Catholic prelature Opus Dei, Tatad has held conservative views on several issues. In 1994, Tatad claimed that the local release of the film Schindler's List without censorship of explicit scenes "would open the floodgates of indecency, obscenity, pornography and gross immorality." As senator, he feuded with Vice President Joseph Estrada on his behavior and extramarital affairs.

== Personal life ==
Tatad married Fernandita "Fenny" Cantero at the Santuario de San Jose in Mandaluyong, Rizal on August 20, 1970. President Marcos and his wife Imelda served as principal sponsors, with the reception held at the InterContinental Hotel in Makati.

However, in spite of his marriage, rumors persisted regarding Tatad's potential romantic relationship with Maharlika Broadcasting news anchor Rita Gadi during martial law.
