= List of vice presidents of the Philippines by age =

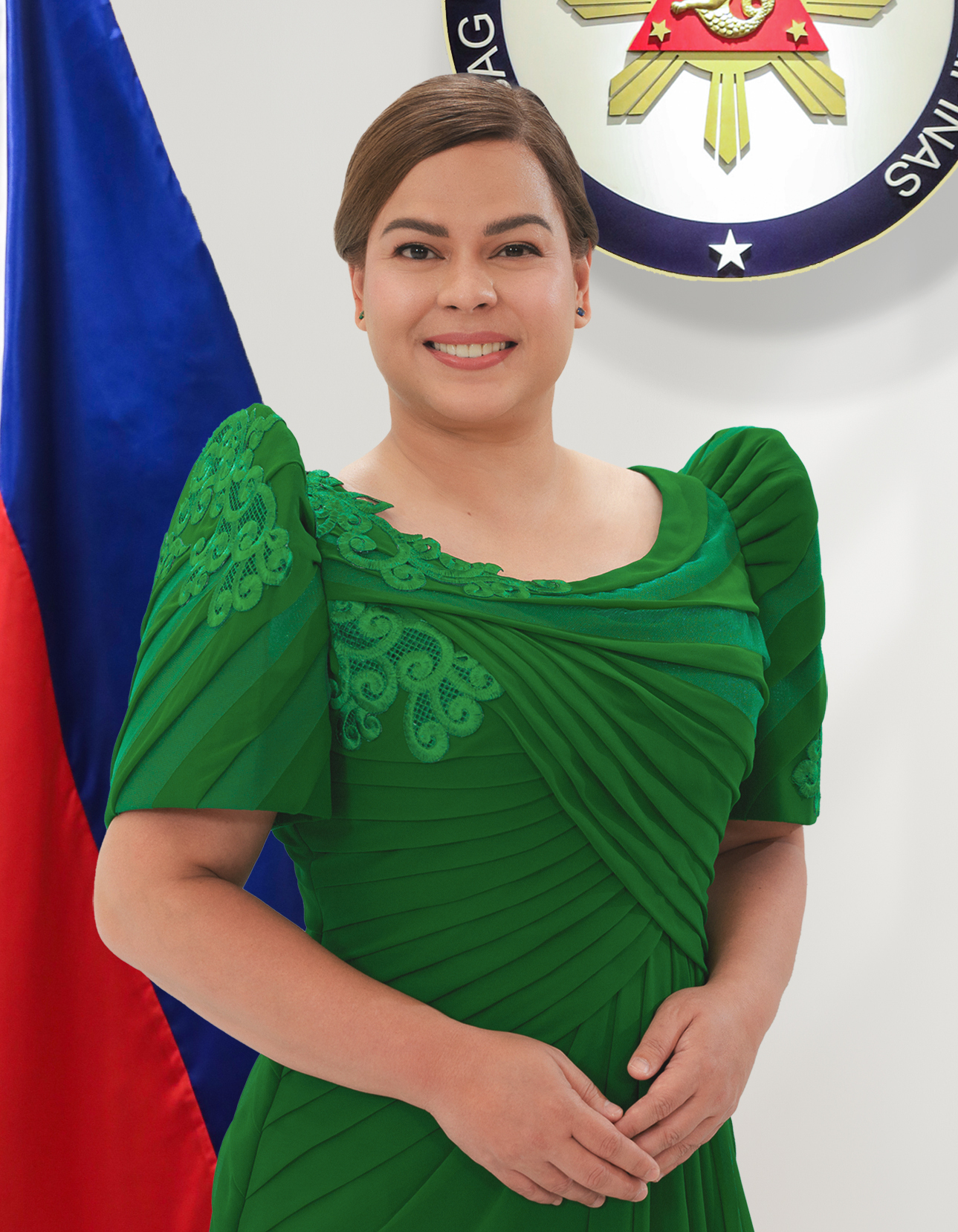
Sara Duterte is the youngest person to be elected vice president of the Philippines.

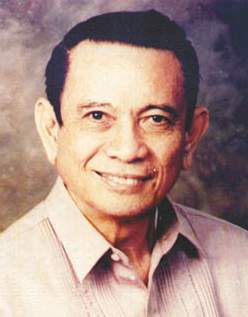
Teofisto Guingona Jr. is the oldest person in history to become vice president of the Philippines.

This is a list of vice presidents of the Philippines by age.

== Overview ==
The 1987 Constitution provides that the vice president shall have the same qualifications as the president, who must be at least forty years of age on the day of the election. The median age upon the accession to the vice presidency is 55 years, the approximate age when Elpidio Quirino, Joseph Estrada, and Noli de Castro assumed office. The youngest person to become the vice president of the Philippines is Sara Duterte, at age 44 years, 30 days. The oldest vice president to assume office is Teofisto Guingona Jr., at age 72 years, 218 days. He is both the oldest when he left office and the oldest living former vice president.

The youngest living former vice president is Leni Robredo, at age 61 years, 106 days. Elpidio Quirino had the shortest post-vice presidency timespan, dying 7 years, 318 days after he left office. Emmanuel Pelaez lived the longest of any vice president after their tenure, dying 37 years, 209 days after leaving office.

== List of vice presidents by age ==
No.	President	Born	Age at start of vice presidency	Age at end of vice presidency	Post-vice presidency timespan	Lifespan	
No.	President	Born	Age at start of vice presidency	Age at end of vice presidency	Post-vice presidency timespan	Died	Age
1	Sergio Osmeña	September 9, 1878	57 years, 67 days November 15, 1935	65 years, 327 days August 1, 1944 (Note: Succeeded to the presidency.)	17 years, 79 days	October 19, 1961	83 years, 40 days
2	Elpidio Quirino	November 16, 1890	55 years, 193 days May 28, 1946	57 years, 153 days April 17, 1948	7 years, 318 days	February 29, 1956	65 years, 105 days
3	Fernando Lopez	April 13, 1904	45 years, 261 days December 30, 1949	49 years, 261 days December 30, 1953	12 years, 0 days (Note: This is the length of Lopez's first (1953–1965) post-vice presidency, between his two terms in office.)	May 26, 1993	89 years, 43 days
4	Carlos P. Garcia	November 4, 1896	57 years, 56 days December 30, 1953	60 years, 134 days March 18, 1957	14 years, 88 days	June 14, 1971	74 years, 222 days
5	Diosdado Macapagal	September 28, 1910	47 years, 93 days December 30, 1957	51 years, 93 days December 30, 1961	35 years, 112 days	April 21, 1997	86 years, 205 days
6	Emmanuel Pelaez	November 30, 1915	46 years, 30 days December 30, 1961	50 years, 30 days December 30, 1965	37 years, 209 days	July 27, 2003	87 years, 239 days
7	Fernando Lopez	April 13, 1904	61 years, 261 days December 30, 1965	68 years, 279 days January 17, 1973	20 years, 129 days (Note: This is the length of Lopez's second (1973–1993) post-vice presidency, after his second term in office.)	May 26, 1993	89 years, 43 days
8	Salvador Laurel	November 18, 1928	57 years, 99 days February 25, 1986	63 years, 225 days June 30, 1992	11 years, 211 days	January 27, 2004	75 years, 70 days
9	Joseph Estrada	April 19, 1937	55 years, 72 days June 30, 1992	61 years, 72 days June 30, 1998	Living	Living	89 years, 110 days
10	Gloria Macapagal Arroyo	April 5, 1947	51 years, 86 days June 30, 1998	53 years, 290 days January 20, 2001	Living	Living	79 years, 124 days
11	Teofisto Guingona Jr.	July 4, 1928	72 years, 218 days February 7, 2001 (Note: Confirmed by Congress to fill an intra-term vacancy in the vice presidency.)	75 years, 362 days June 30, 2004	Living	Living	98 years, 34 days
12	Noli De Castro	July 6, 1949	54 years, 360 days June 30, 2004	60 years, 359 days June 30, 2010	Living	Living	77 years, 32 days
13	Jejomar Binay	November 11, 1942	67 years, 231 days June 30, 2010	73 years, 232 days June 30, 2016	Living	Living	83 years, 269 days
14	Leni Robredo	April 23, 1965	51 years, 68 days June 30, 2016	57 years, 68 days June 30, 2022	Living	Living	61 years, 106 days
15	Sara Duterte	May 31, 1978	44 years, 30 days June 30, 2022	Incumbent	Incumbent	Living	48 years, 68 days

== See also ==
- List of presidents of the Philippines by age
