= List of vice presidents of the Philippines by place of primary affiliation =

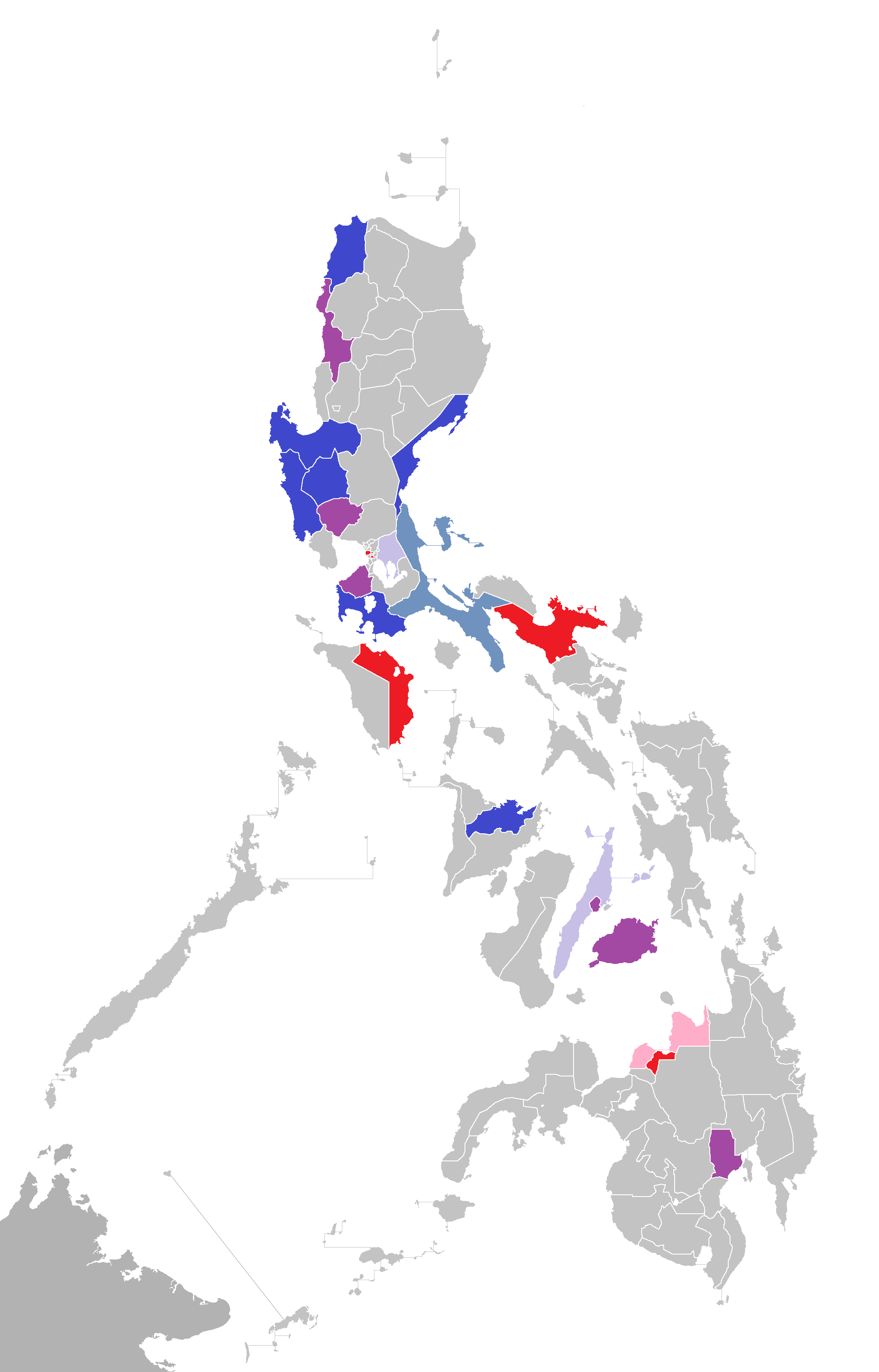
Home provinces of the presidents (blue) & vice presidents (red). Provinces that are home of both presidents and vice presidents are in purple.

This is a list of vice presidents of the Philippines by place of primary affiliation. Some vice presidents have been born in one province, but are commonly associated with another.

== Provinces of primary affiliation ==
=== Provinces of primary affiliation by vice president ===
No.	Vice president	Province
1	Sergio Osmeña	Cebu
2	Elpidio Quirino	Ilocos Sur
3 and 7	Fernando Lopez	Iloilo
4	Carlos P. Garcia	Bohol
5	Diosdado Macapagal	Pampanga
6	Emmanuel Pelaez	Misamis Oriental
8	Salvador Laurel	Batangas
9	Joseph Estrada	Metro Manila
10	Gloria Macapagal Arroyo	Pampanga
11	Teofisto Guingona Jr.	Misamis Oriental
12	Noli de Castro	Oriental Mindoro
13	Jejomar Binay	Metro Manila
14	Leni Robredo	Camarines Sur
15	Sara Duterte	Davao del Sur

=== Vice presidents by province of primary affiliation ===
State	Vice president per province	Vice president	#th Vice president
Metro Manila	2	Joseph Estrada	9
Metro Manila	2	Jejomar Binay	13
Misamis Oriental	2	Emmanuel Pelaez	6
Misamis Oriental	2	Teofisto Guingona Jr.	11
Pampanga	2	Diosdado Macapagal	5
Pampanga	2	Gloria Macapagal Arroyo	10
Batangas	1	Salvador Laurel	8
Bohol	1	Carlos P. Garcia	4
Camarines Sur	1	Leni Robredo	14
Cebu	1	Sergio Osmeña	1
Davao del Sur	1	Sara Duterte	15
Ilocos Sur	1	Elpidio Quirino	2
Iloilo	1	Fernando Lopez	3, 7
Oriental Mindoro	1	Noli de Castro	12

== Places of birth ==
Birthplaces of vice presidents of the Philippines. Vice presidents born in modern-day Metro Manila are shown separately.
Birthplaces of vice presidents of the Philippines in modern-day Metro Manila

=== Vice presidents by province of birth ===
Province	Vice presidents per province	Vice president	Year inaugurated	Birthplace
Metro Manila	5	Teofisto Guingona Jr.	2001	San Juan, Rizal
Metro Manila	5	Salvador Laurel	1986	Manila
Metro Manila	5	Joseph Estrada	1992	Manila
Metro Manila	5	Jejomar Binay	2010	Manila
Metro Manila	5	Gloria Macapagal Arroyo	1998	San Juan, Rizal
Bohol	1	Carlos P. Garcia	1953	Talibon
Camarines Sur	1	Leni Robredo	2016	Naga City
Cebu	1	Sergio Osmeña	1935	Cebu City
Davao del Sur	1	Sara Duterte	2022	Davao City
Ilocos Sur	1	Elpidio Quirino	1946	Vigan City
Iloilo	1	Fernando Lopez	1949, 1965	Iloilo City
Misamis Oriental	1	Emmanuel Pelaez	1961	Medina, Misamis
Oriental Mindoro	1	Noli de Castro	2004	Pola, Mindoro
Pampanga	1	Diosdado Macapagal	1957	Lubao

=== Vice presidents who did not primarily reside in their respective birth provinces ===
As of 2016, 3 out of 13 (accounting for Fernando Lopez' two non-consecutive terms) individuals (23%) were inaugurated after officially residing in a different place than their birth.

Vice president	Birth province	Home province
Salvador Laurel	Metro Manila	Batangas
Gloria Macapagal Arroyo	Rizal	Pampanga
Teofisto Guingona Jr.	Rizal	Misamis Oriental

== See also ==
- List of presidents of the Philippines by province
