= 2004 Philippine presidential election in Cavite =

- May 10, 2004
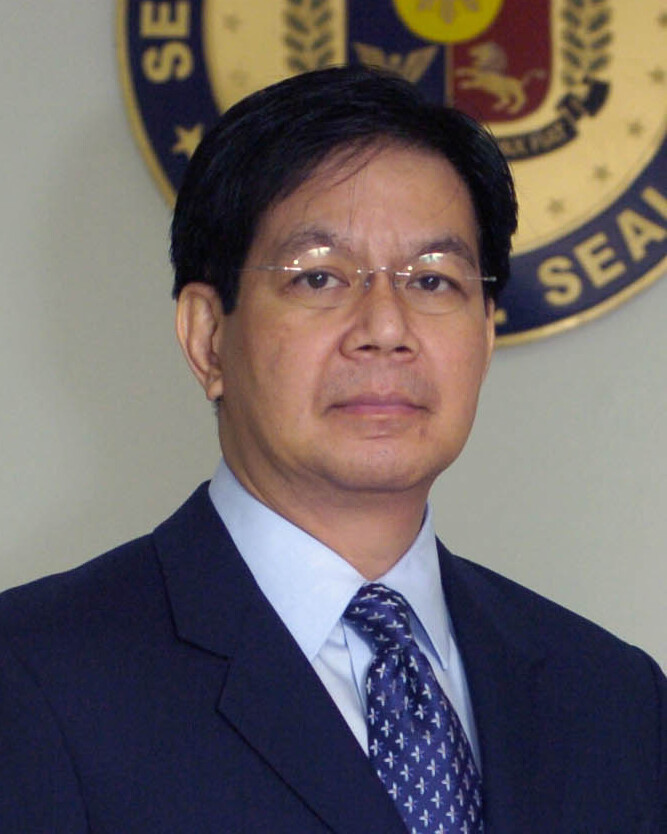

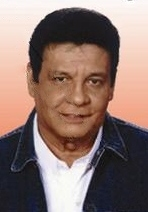

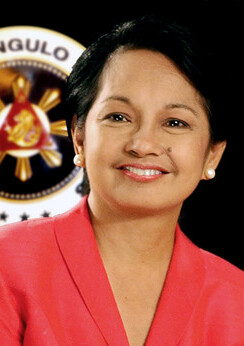
Candidate	Panfilo Lacson	Fernando Poe Jr.	Gloria Macapagal Arroyo
Party	LDP (Aquino Wing)	Independent	Lakas
Alliance		KNP	K4
Running mate	None	Loren Legarda	Noli de Castro
popular vote	347,539	239,749	183,719
Percentage	38.87%	26.81%	20.55%
President before election
Gloria Macapagal Arroyo (Note: President Joseph Estrada was elected in 1998 but resigned on January 20, 2001 due to Second EDSA Revolution so Vice President Gloria Macapagal Arroyo assumed the presidency)
Lakas
Elected President
Gloria Macapagal Arroyo
Lakas
- 2004 Philippine vice presidential election in Cavite
- May 10, 2004
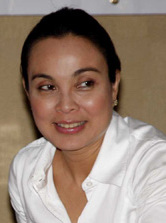

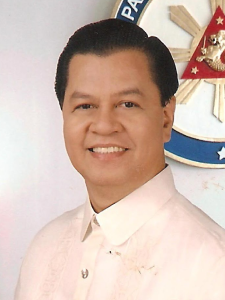
Candidate	Loren Legarda	Noli de Castro
Party	Independent	Independent
Alliance	KNP	K4
popular vote	438,223	360,999
Percentage	52.07%	42.89%
Vice President before election
Teofisto Guingona Jr. (Note: Vice President Gloria Macapagal Arroyo was elected in 1998 and initially her term expired in 2004 but had to assume the presidency on January 20, 2001 and Guingona was appointed vice president on February 7, 2001)
Independent
Elected Vice President
Noli de Castro
Independent

The 2004 Philippine presidential and vice presidential elections in Cavite were held on Monday, May 10, 2010, as part of the 2004 Philippine general election in which all 79 provinces and 84 cities participated. Voters voted for the president and the vice president separately.

Senator Panfilo Lacson won in his home province of Cavite and defeated action star Fernando Poe Jr., incumbent president Gloria Macapagal Arroyo, Education secretary Raul Roco, and preacher Eddie Villanueva.

Senator Loren Legarda won the province in the vice presidential race and defeated fellow senator Noli de Castro, former Tarlac vice governor Herminio Aquino, and Rodolfo Pajo.

This is the only province in this election where Lacson won.

== Electoral system ==
According to the Constitution of the Philippines, the elections are held every six years after 1992, on the second Monday of May. The incumbent president is term-limited and ineligible for re-election. (Note: The constitution has an exemption to this, It allows an incumbent president who has succeeded to the office and served for not more than four years to run for a full, new six-year term, Gloria Macapagal Arroyo served 3 years and 4 months prior to this election.) The incumbent vice president is eligible to run for re-election and may run for two consecutive terms. The plurality voting system is used to determine the winner: the candidate with the highest number of votes, whether or not one has a majority, wins the presidency. The vice presidential election is a separate election, is held on the same rules, and voters may split their ticket. Both winners will serve six-year terms commencing on the noon of June 30, 2004, and ending on the same day six years later.

== Candidates ==
List of Presidential and Vice Presidential candidates.
Candidate (For President)	Party	Candidate (For Vice President/Running Mate	Party
Gloria Macapagal Arroyo	Lakas	Noli de Castro	Independent
Eddie Gil (disqualified)	Partido Isang Bansa, Isang Diwa	Rodolfo Pajo	Partido Isang Bansa, Isang Diwa
Panfilo Lacson	LDP (Aquino Wing)	None	
Fernando Poe Jr.	Independent	Loren Legarda	Independent
Raul Roco	Aksyon	Herminio Aquino	Aksyon
Eddie Villanueva	Bangon Pilipinas	None	

== Results ==
=== Presidential result ===
2004 Philippine presidential election results in Cavite
Party	Candidate	Votes	%
LDP (Aquino Wing)	Panfilo Lacson	347,539	38.87%
Independent	Fernando Poe Jr.	239,749	26.81%
Lakas	Gloria Macapagal Arroyo	183,719	20.55%
Bangon Pilipinas	Eddie Villanueva	76,213	8.52%
Aksyon	Raul Roco	46,925	5.25%
Total votes		894,145	100.00%

=== Vice presidential result ===
2004 Philippine vice presidential election results in Cavite
Party	Candidate	Votes	%
Independent	Loren Legarda	438,223	52.07%
Independent	Noli de Castro	360,999	42.89%
Aksyon	Herminio Aquino	41,712	4.96%
Partido Isang Bansa, Isang Diwa	Rodolfo Pajo	695	0.08
Total votes		841,629	100.00%
