= List of presidents of the Philippines by age =

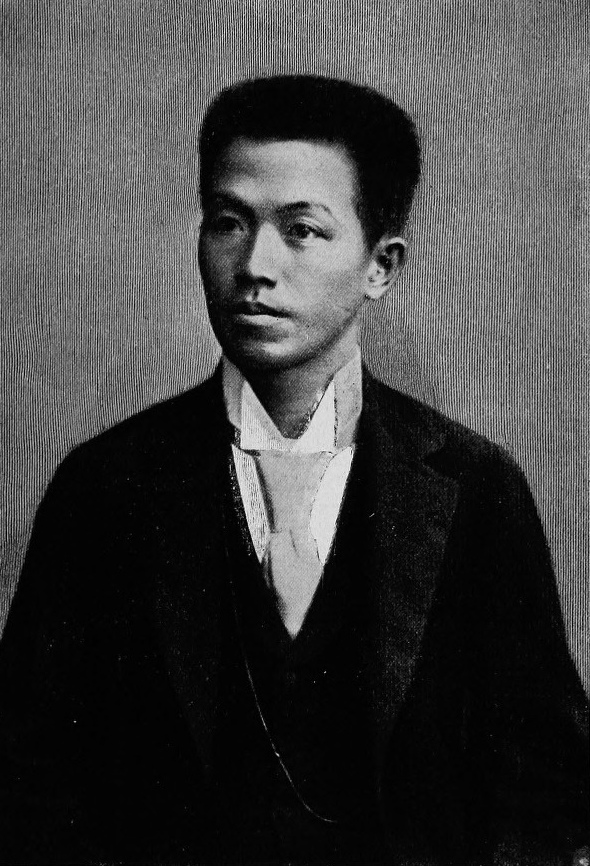
Emilio Aguinaldo was the youngest person to become the president of the Philippines.

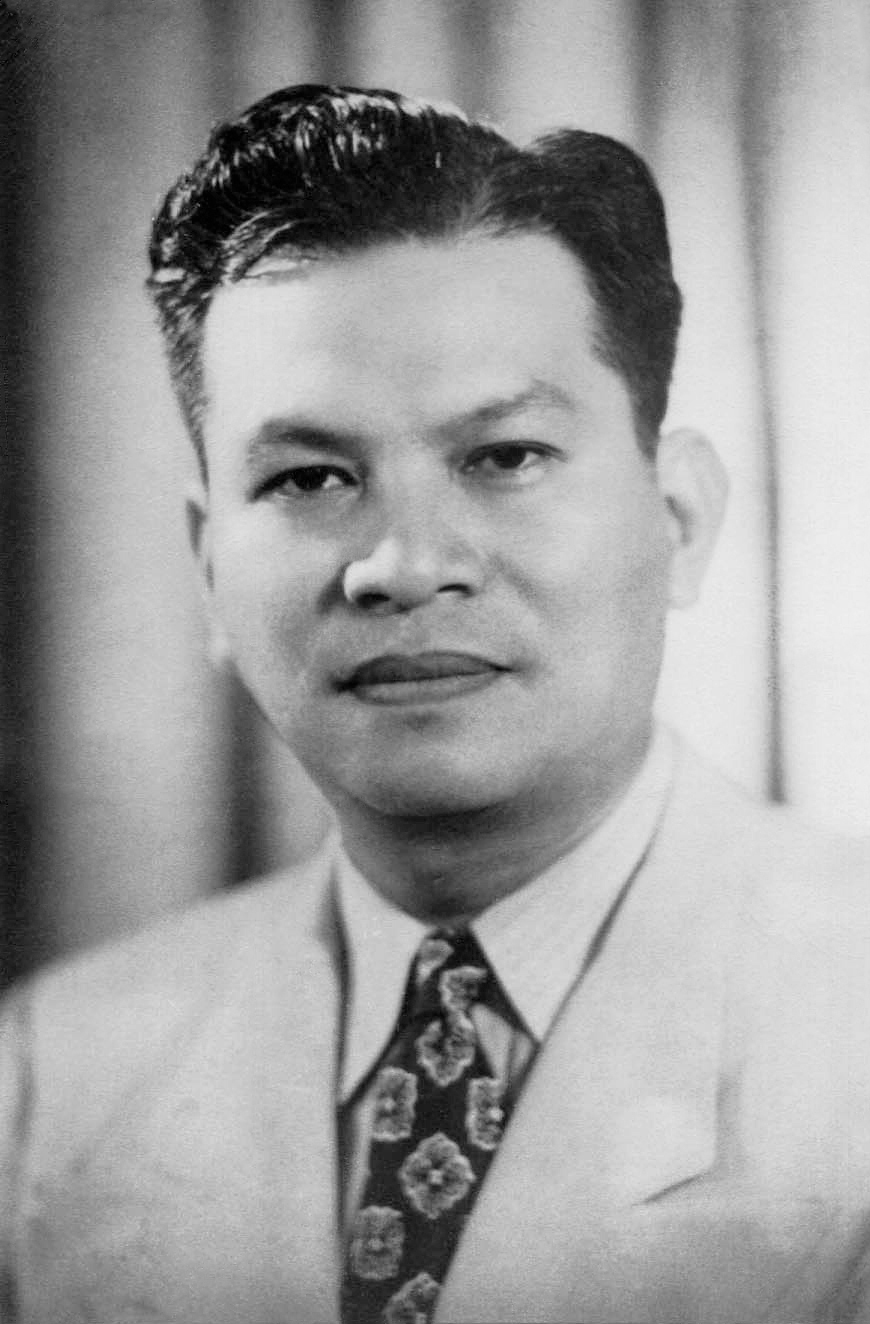
Ramon Magsaysay is the youngest person in history to be elected president of the Philippines.

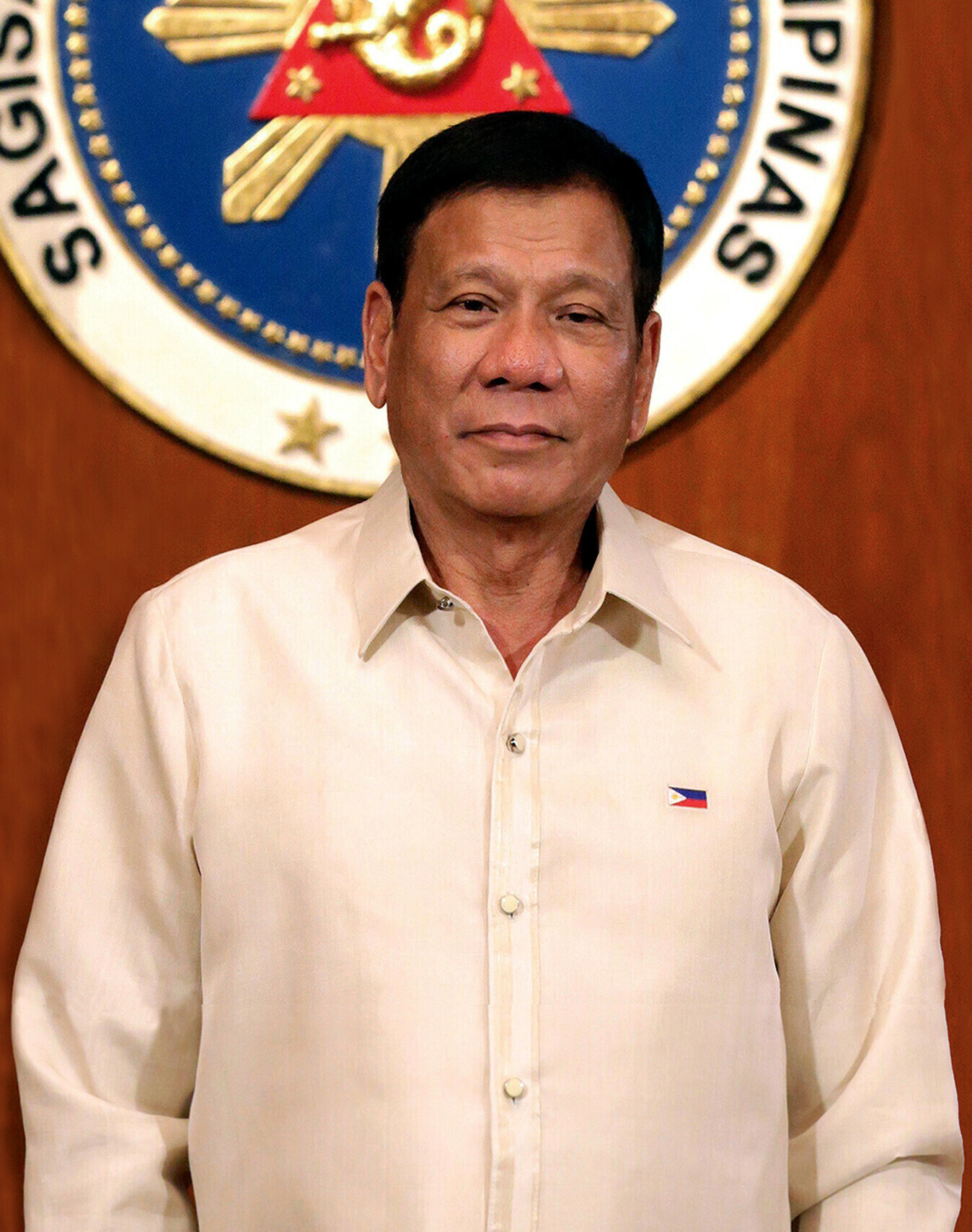
Rodrigo Duterte is the oldest person in history to be elected president of the Philippines.

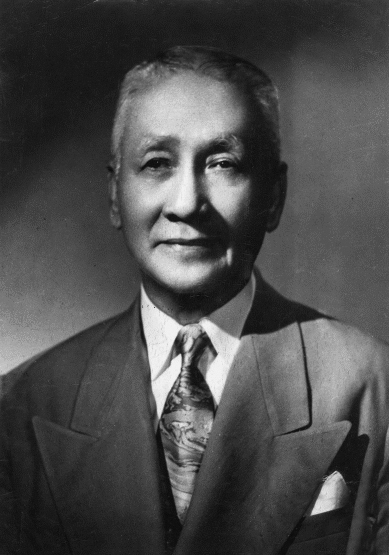
Sergio Osmeña is the oldest person in history to be unelected president of the Philippines.

This is a list of presidents of the Philippines by age.

== Overview ==
Article VII, Section 2 of the 1987 Constitution provides that a president must be at least forty years of age on the day of the election. The median age at inauguration of Philippine presidents is 54 years. The youngest person to become the president of the Philippines was Emilio Aguinaldo at age 29 years, 307 days, after being elected by the Malolos Congress. However, the youngest elected president Ramon Magsaysay at the age of 46 years, 121 days when he took his oath of office. The oldest person to have been elected president is Rodrigo Duterte, at age 71 years, 94 days during his inauguration. Both Aguinaldo and Duterte are the youngest and oldest presidents at the end of their tenures, respectively.

Aguinaldo also had the longest lifespan and retirement of any president, outliving six of his successors. He died at the age of 94 years, 321 days; 62 years after his presidency. Elpidio Quirino had the shortest retirement of any president, dying of a heart attack 2 years, 61 days after leaving office. The oldest living former president is Joseph Estrada, at age 89 years, 174 days. The youngest living former president is Gloria Macapagal Arroyo, at age 79 years, 188 days.

== List of presidents by age ==
No.	President	Born	Age at start of presidency	Age at end of presidency	Post-presidency timespan	Lifespan	
No.	President	Born	Age at start of presidency	Age at end of presidency	Post-presidency timespan	Died	Age
1	Emilio Aguinaldo	March 22, 1869	29 years, 307 days January 23, 1899	32 years, 1 day March 23, 1901	62 years, 320 days	February 6, 1964	94 years, 321 days
2	Manuel Quezon	August 19, 1878	57 years, 88 days November 15, 1935	65 years, 348 days August 1, 1944	Died in office	August 1, 1944	65 years, 348 days
3	Jose P. Laurel	March 9, 1891	52 years, 219 days October 14, 1943	54 years, 161 days August 17, 1945	14 years, 81 days	November 6, 1959	68 years, 242 days
4	Sergio Osmeña	September 9, 1878	65 years, 327 days August 1, 1944	67 years, 261 days May 28, 1946	15 years, 144 days	October 19, 1961	83 years, 40 days
5	Manuel Roxas	January 1, 1892	54 years, 147 days May 28, 1946	56 years, 105 days April 15, 1948	Died in office	April 15, 1948	56 years, 105 days
6	Elpidio Quirino	November 16, 1890	57 years, 153 days April 17, 1948	63 years, 44 days December 30, 1953	2 years, 61 days	February 29, 1956	65 years, 105 days
7	Ramon Magsaysay	August 31, 1907	46 years, 121 days December 30, 1953	49 years, 198 days March 17, 1957	Died in office	March 17, 1957	49 years, 198 days
8	Carlos P. Garcia	November 4, 1896	60 years, 134 days March 18, 1957	65 years, 56 days December 30, 1961	9 years, 166 days	June 14, 1971	74 years, 222 days
9	Diosdado Macapagal	September 28, 1910	51 years, 93 days December 30, 1961	55 years, 93 days December 30, 1965	31 years, 112 days	April 21, 1997	86 years, 205 days
10	Ferdinand E. Marcos	September 11, 1917	48 years, 110 days December 30, 1965	68 years, 167 days February 25, 1986	3 years, 215 days	September 28, 1989	72 years, 17 days
11	Corazon Aquino	January 25, 1933	53 years, 31 days February 25, 1986	59 years, 157 days June 30, 1992	17 years, 32 days	August 1, 2009	76 years, 188 days
12	Fidel V. Ramos	March 18, 1928	64 years, 104 days June 30, 1992	70 years, 104 days June 30, 1998	24 years, 31 days	July 31, 2022	94 years, 135 days
13	Joseph Estrada	April 19, 1937	61 years, 72 days June 30, 1998	63 years, 276 days January 20, 2001	Living	Living	89 years, 174 days
14	Gloria Macapagal Arroyo	April 5, 1947	53 years, 290 days January 20, 2001	63 years, 86 days June 30, 2010	Living	Living	79 years, 188 days
15	Benigno Aquino III	February 8, 1960	50 years, 142 days June 30, 2010	56 years, 143 days June 30, 2016	4 years, 359 days	June 24, 2021	61 years, 136 days
16	Rodrigo Duterte	March 28, 1945	71 years, 94 days June 30, 2016	77 years, 94 days June 30, 2022	Living	Living	81 years, 196 days
17	Bongbong Marcos	September 13, 1957	64 years, 290 days June 30, 2022	Incumbent	Incumbent	Living	69 years, 27 days

== See also ==
- List of vice presidents of the Philippines by age
