= Teofisto Guingona Sr. =

Filipino politician (1883–1963)

The Honourable Teofisto J. Guingona Sr.
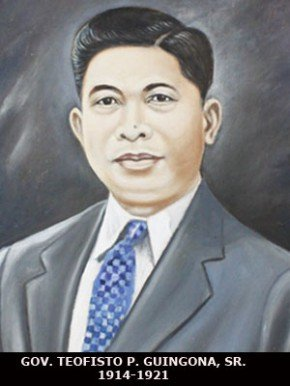
- Portrait as Governor of Agusan

Senator of the Philippines from the 12th District
- In office November 15, 1920 – November 13, 1923 Serving with Lope K. Santos (1920–1921) and Hadji Butu (1922–1923)
- Appointed by: Francis Burton Harrison
- Preceded by: Hadji Butu
- Succeeded by: José Alejandrino

Acting Governor of the Department of Mindanao and Sulu
- In office 1918–1920

Governor of Agusan
- In office 1914–1917
- Preceded by: Position established
- Succeeded by: Apolonio Curato Sr.

Member of the Philippine Assembly from Negros Oriental's 2nd District
- In office October 16, 1909 – April 9, 1914
- Preceded by: Vicente Locsin
- Succeeded by: Leopoldo Rovira

Personal details
- Born: Teofisto Guingona y Jamora; September 20, 1883 Guimaras, Iloilo, Captaincy General of the Philippines
- Died: April 11, 1963 (aged 79) Manila, Philippines
- Party: Democrata
- Other political affiliations: Progresista (before 1922)
- Spouse: Josefa Tayko
- Children: 8 (including Teofisto Jr.)
- Relatives: Teofisto "TG" Guingona III (grandson)
- Education: Escuela de Derecho
- Occupation: Revolutionary soldier
- Profession: Lawyer
- Known for: Pipoy

Teofisto Jamora Guingona Sr. (born Teofisto Guingona y Jamora; September 20, 1883 – April 11, 1963) was a Filipino revolutionary soldier, lawyer, judge, and politician. He was father of former Vice President Teofisto Guingona Jr. and the grandfather of former Senator TG Guingona.

== Early life and education ==
He was born in Guimaras, Iloilo, on September 20, 1883, to Don Vicente Guingona and Doña Francisca Jamora. Guingona joined the insurgent army when the revolution against Spain broke out. He became the first Municipal Treasurer of Nabalas from 1899 to 1901. He then became Municipal President from 1901 to 1902. In 1907, Guingona graduated from the Escuela de Derecho with the degree of Bachelor of Laws.

== Political career ==
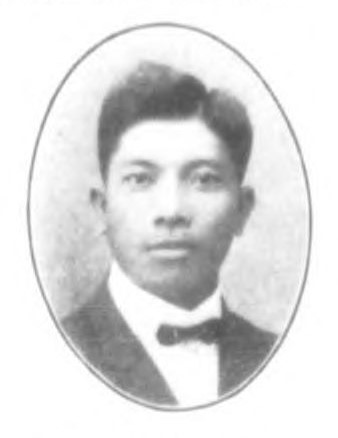
Guingona as a member of the Philippine Assembly, 1912

Guingona was elected Assemblyman from the 2nd district of Negros Oriental in 1909 and was re-elected to the same post in 1912. Guingona then resigned from the Legislature when he was appointed as Governor of Agusan, serving from 1914 to 1917, as the first Filipino to hold the post. He then served as acting Governor of Department of Mindanao and Sulu from 1918 to 1920. He was also the first Director of the Bureau of Non-Christian Tribes in 1920. In 1920, he was appointed as Senator for the 12th Senatorial District comprising Mindanao and Sulu until his resignation in 1923. From 1924 to 1930, he was the chief of the legal department of Levy Hermanos, Inc. He served as the Judge of the Court of First Instance from 1930 to 1931. He served again as Director of the Bureau of Non-Christian Tribes until its abolition in 1935.

== Personal life ==
He was married to Josefa Tayko and had 8 children: Efraim, Inday, Eduardo, Manuel, Luis, Teofisto Jr., and twins Benjamin and Jose.

== Death ==
He died on April 11, 1963, due to stroke.
