= TG Guingona =

Filipino politician (born 1959)

The Honorable Teofisto "TG" Guingona III
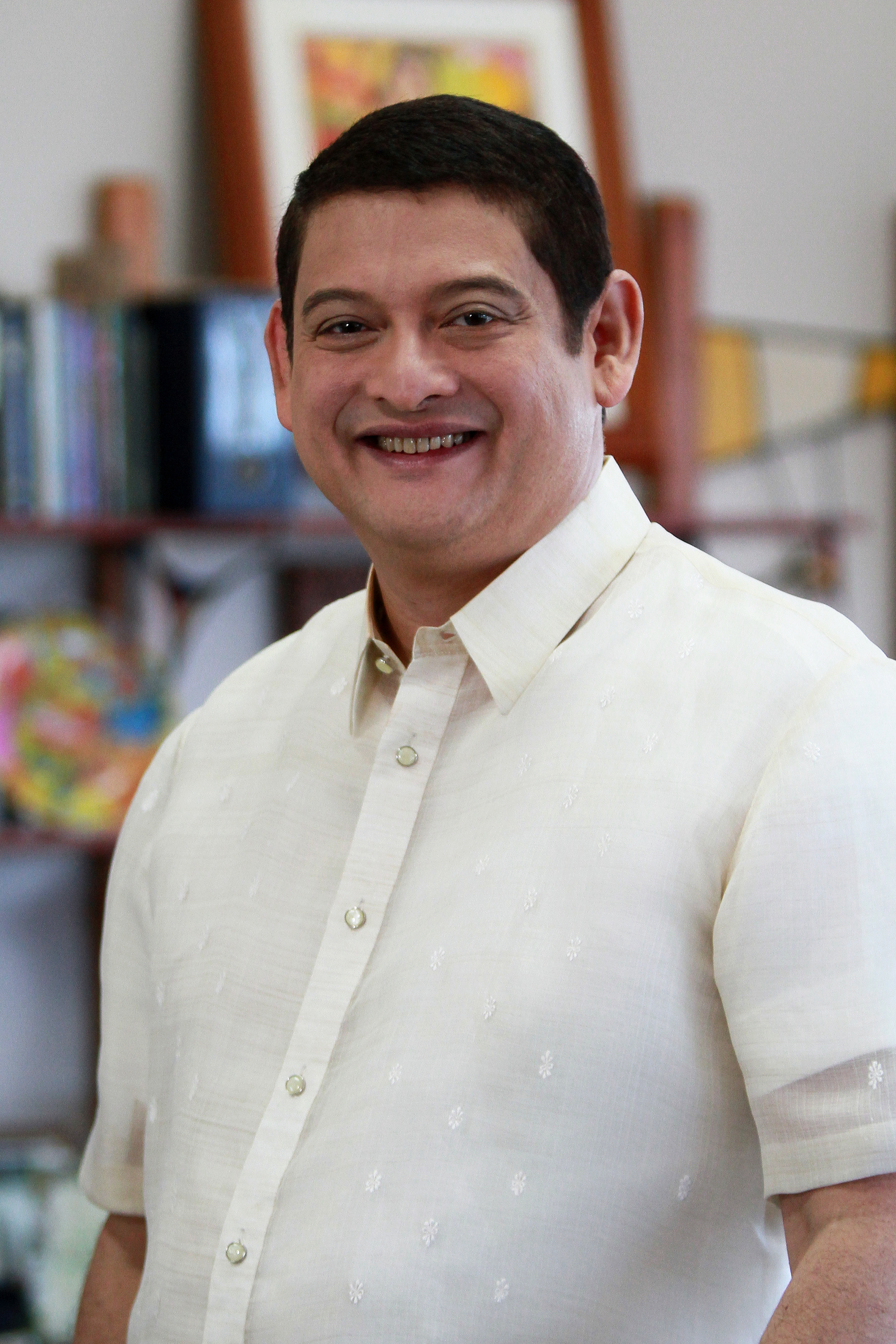

Senator of the Philippines
- In office June 30, 2010 – June 30, 2016

Chair of the Senate Blue Ribbon Committee
- In office July 26, 2010 – June 30, 2016
- Preceded by: Richard Gordon
- Succeeded by: Richard Gordon

Member of the Philippine House of Representatives from Bukidnon's 2nd district
- In office June 30, 2004 – June 30, 2010
- Preceded by: Berthobal R. Ancheta Sr.
- Succeeded by: Florencio T. Flores Jr.

Personal details
- Born: Teofisto de Lara Guingona III; April 19, 1959 (age 67) Manila, Philippines
- Party: KANP (2025–present)
- Other political affiliations: Liberal (2007–2025); Nacionalista (2003–2007)
- Spouse: Ma. Victoria Garcia-Guingona
- Relations: Teofisto Guingona Jr. (father)
- Education: Ateneo de Manila University (BA, LL.B)
- Profession: Lawyer

Teofisto "TG" de Lara Guingona III (Tagalog pronunciation: [giŋˈgɔna]), or more commonly known as "TG," is a lawyer and the son of former vice president Teofisto "Tito" Guingona Jr. He was a congressman of the 2nd District of Bukidnon during the 13th and 14th Congress from 2004 to 2010 and a senator of the Philippines during the 15th and 16th Congress from 2010 to 2016.

TG Guingona passed a total of twenty-three laws as a legislator. Among these are measures designed to improve the health system of the Philippines such as The Expanded Senior Citizens Act which prescribes that all Filipino senior citizens be automatically covered by the Philippine Health Insurance Corporation (PhilHealth), The Rare Diseases Act which improves the access of patients who are diagnosed to have a rare disease or are suspected of having a rare disease to comprehensive medical care, and The Comprehensive Tuberculosis Elimination Plan Act, which expands PhilHealth's tuberculosis packages and provides free tuberculosis medicine and laboratory services nationwide. The law also expands PhilHealth's tuberculosis package to include new patients, relapse patients, return-after-default cases, and cases requiring extended treatment.

As chairperson of the Senate Committee on Health and Demography, TG Guingona also fought against the eviction of the Philippine Children's Medical Center (PCMC) by facilitating the land transfer between the Department of Health (DOH) and the National Housing Authority (Philippines) (NHA). The land transfer allowed the DOH to own the lot where PCMC stands, thus providing PCMC, the Philippines' largest public hospital for children, the security to continuously operate and provide subsidized medical treatment to more than 70,000 Filipino children, most of which belong to the marginalized sector.

Other major legislations authored and co-authored by TG Guingona are The Philippine Competition Act, The Anti-Money Laundering Act, and The Sandiganbayan Act.

The Philippine Competition Act is the first competition law in the Philippines. Through this, the Philippine Competition Commission was created to protect consumers from product price spikes, allow consumers to have more options and better products to choose from, and ultimately empower small businesses.

The Anti-Money Laundering Act which gives the Anti-Money Laundering Council (AMLC) the power to conduct ex parte (without notice) inquiries into the bank accounts of persons who may be committing unlawful activities and/or money laundering upon the order of any competent court while emphasizing constitutional provisions to ensure that indiscriminate and illegal inquiries are not made.

The Sandiganbayan Act aims to address the resolution of graft and corruption cases in the Philippines by increasing the number of divisions in the Sandiganbayan, rationalizing its procedures, and expanding its capacity to eliminate graft and corruption in the government in a timely and efficient manner to ensure that justice will be implemented with the highest level of integrity.

In 2012, TG Guingona was the only senator who voted against The Cybercrime Prevention Act or The Cybercrime Law. This law was coined "Cyber Martial Law" by the public for its vague online libel clauses which was deemed repressive of the Filipino people's constitutional right to freedom of speech. Upon its passage into law, TG Guingona filed a petition before the Supreme Court to repeal these clauses. The Supreme Court heeded this call and ordered a temporary restraining order on its implementation the following month before finally ruling some provisions of the Cybercrime Prevention Act as unconstitutional in 2014.

TG Guingona has also been selected as a Champion of Good Governance by the Kaya Natin! Movement, a non-profit and non-government organization in the Philippines. TG Guingona was recognized for his efforts to promote good governance and ethical leadership in government as exemplified in his accomplishments as the chairperson of the Senate Committee on Accountability of Public Officers and Investigations (Blue Ribbon). As chairperson, TG Guingona led the investigations on various graft and corruption activities in government in aid of legislation such as the Philippine Charity Sweepstakes Office (PCSO) Fund Scam, The Philippine National Police (PNP) Helicopter Scam, and one of the biggest corruption scandals in recent history, the Pork Barrel Scam.

TG Guingona also authored The Freedom of Information Bill and persistently called for its passage into law. The Freedom of Information Bill mandates the disclosure of information from all government agencies in relation to their budget, procurement, transactions, and other pertinent information regarding government agencies to any member of the public. This bill does not only pursue greater transparency and accountability in governance, but it also promotes citizen participation and nation-building because when armed with relevant information, people can more efficiently work with government and introduce reforms.

== Early life and education ==
Teofisto "TG" Guingona was born in Manila, Philippines, on April 19, 1959, to a family of Filipino politicians. His paternal grandfather, Teofisto Guingona Sr., was the governor of Mindanao during the term of President Manuel Quezon; and his maternal grandfather, Vicente Botao de Lara, was the governor of Misamis Oriental. His father, Teofisto "Tito" Guingona Jr., was a senator, chairman of the Commission on Audit, executive secretary, secretary of justice, secretary of foreign affairs and vice president of the Philippines. His mother, Ruth de Lara-Guingona, also served as governor of Misamis Oriental and mayor of Gingoog, Misamis Oriental. Being deeply rooted in Mindanao, TG Guingona is fluent in the Filipino language Cebuano-Bisaya and Tagalog, as well as in the English language.

TG Guingona attended the Ateneo de Manila University from grade school through law school. He graduated from college in 1981 with a degree in economics before pursuing a law degree in the Ateneo School of Law. He graduated from law school in 1985 and was admitted to the Integrated Bar of the Philippines in 1986.

TG Guingona was as student activist during the martial law era. He was a member of the Ateneo de Manila Student Council (student government) when then President Ferdinand Marcos called for an Interim Batasang Pambansa (national parliament) election in 1978. In response, the opposition in Metro Manila formed a political party called Lakas ng Bayan (strength of the nation) or LABAN (fight) for short. Among the notable candidates of LABAN were Benigno "Ninoy Aquino Jr., Neptali "Nap" Gonzales Sr., Ramon "Monching" Mitra Jr., Aquilino "Nene" Pimentel Jr., Alejandro "Anding" Roces, Francisco "Soc" Rodrigo, and TG Guingona's father, Teofisto "Tito" Guingona Jr. All of LABAN's twenty-one candidates lost, with obscure candidates from Kilusang Bagong Lipunan, the political party of Ferdinand Marcos, winning against the popular Benigno "Ninoy" Aquino Jr. at the time. LABAN found the electoral cheating so brazen that a protest march was called for April 9, 1987. Some members of the faculty and the student council of the Ateneo de Manila University, including TG Guingona, joined the LABAN candidates in protesting the fraudulent election. All the demonstrators were arrested while marching along España Boulevard in front of the University of Santo Tomas. TG Guingona was jailed together with prominent political and religious personalities Lorenzo "Ka Tanny" Tañada Sr.; Francisco "Soc" Rodrigo; Aquilino "Nene" Pimentel Jr.; Ceferino "Joker" Arroyo Jr.; Fr. Romeo "Archie" Intengan, S.J.; Jerry Treñas; Manuel Antonio "Dondi" Teehankee, the son of the former Supreme Court justice Claudio Teehankee Sr.; and Ruth Guingona, TG Guingona's mother. After several days, TG Guingona was released from jail and his case was categorized as nolle prosequi (the state shall no longer prosecute). The incarceration was a very maturing process for TG Guingona who was only nineteen years old at the time.

Before his election as a public servant, TG Guingona was an active practitioner and contributor to the National Shelter Program as a private businessman-developer of socialized and low-cost housing subdivisions all over the Philippines. The National Shelter Program is designed to assist informal settler families and low to middle-income families through affordable housing opportunities.

== Political career ==
=== House of Representatives ===
TG Guingona was first elected into public office on 2004 as the representative of the 2nd District of Bukidnon. He served the post for two terms before running for Senator on 2010. He served as the deputy minority floor leader and the minority representative to the then called Joint Congressional Power Commission which deals with matters relating to energy and electricity.

During his tenure as congressman, TG Guingona authored a total of 30 bills, six of which were passed into law. Among these are the Philippine Disaster Risk Reduction Management Act and the Mindanao Development Authority (MinDA) Act.

The Philippine Disaster Risk Reduction Management Act launched the paradigm shift from emergency relief and response, which is reactive in nature, to a more proactive approach, which is disaster mitigation. The law replaces the National Disaster Coordinating Council (NDCC) with the National Disaster Risk Reduction and Management Council (NDRRMC) and establishes the Local Disaster Risk Reduction and Management Fund wherein local government units (LGU) are to set aside five percent of their estimated revenue from regular sources for their disaster councils. Seventy percent of the Local Disaster Risk Reduction and Management Fund shall be used for pre-disaster measures while the rest of shall be allocated as a Quick Response Fund which serves as a stand-by fund for relief and recovery programs.

The Mindanao Development Authority (MinDA) Act creates the Mindanao Development Authority. The Mindanao Development Authority is the government agency responsible for the promotion, coordination, and facilitation of the active and extensive participation of all sectors to foster socio-economic development in Mindanao. TG Guingona has expressed that he believes that investing in the human and social capital in Mindanao may end the cycle of violence that has afflicted the island for a long time.

As an advocate of good governance, TG Guingona also pushed for transparency in budgetary procedures and promoted reform in the national budgeting system. When evidence of apparent electoral cheating by then President Gloria Macapagal-Arroyo became public, TG Guingona actively endorsed and pursued her impeachment. The alleged cheating in the presidential election by Gloria Macapagal-Arroyo became known as the Hello Garci scandal.

==== Laws passed as the Representative of the 2nd District of Bukidnon ====
1. R.A. 9500: The University of the Philippines Charter of 2008
2. R.A. 9497: The Civil Aviation Authority Act of 2008
3. R.A. 9576: The Philippine Deposit Insurance (PDIC) Charter of 2009
4. R.A. 9745: The Anti-Torture Act of 2009
5. R.A. 9996: The Mindanao Development Authority (MinDA) Act of 2010
6. R.A. 10121: The Philippine Disaster Risk Reduction and Management Act of 2010

=== Senate ===
TG Guingona was elected senator of the Philippines in 2010 and served until 2016. He authored a total of one hundred and twenty-four bills and passed eighteen laws in six years, and especially advocated for the improvement of the health system, transparency and accountability in government, and the protection of human rights through legislation. He likewise served as the chairperson of the following Senate committees:

1. Senate Committee on Accountability of Public Officers and Investigations (Blue Ribbon)
2. Senate Committee Health and Demography
3. Senate Committee on Peace, Unification, and Reconciliation
4. Congressional Oversight Committee on the Anti-Money Laundering Act

In 2015, the Commission on Audit (COA) released a report with an itemized list of amounts paid to and expenses incurred by each senator in 2014. In the said report, COA tagged TG Guingona as the lowest spending senator of the Philippines.

==== Improvement of the health system ====
TG Guingona proposed and enacted several measures to improve the state of the health system of the Philippine from strengthening the capacity of public hospitals to treat more people and more illnesses, to promoting the welfare of healthcare workers, and providing patients with better access to quality healthcare. Among these were the following:

- The Expanded Senior Citizens Act which mandates PhilHealth to cover all Filipino senior citizens, thus allowing them automatic eligibility to enjoy various PhilHealth benefit packages.
- The Rare Diseases Act which improves the access of patients diagnosed to have a rare disease or suspected of having a rare disease to comprehensive medical care.
- The Comprehensive Tuberculosis Elimination Plan Act which provides free anti-tuberculosis medicine and laboratory services to patients nationwide. The law also expands PhilHealth's tuberculosis package to include new patients, relapse patients, return-after-default cases, and cases requiring extended treatment.
- RA 10770: Vicente Sotto Memorial Medical Center which increased the bed capacity of the public hospital in Cebu.
- RA 10678: Davao Regional Medical Center which converted the Davao Regional Hospital in Tagum City into Davao Regional Medical Center and increased the bed capacity of the public hospital.
- RA 10677 Northern Mindanao Medical Center which increased the bed capacity of the hospital in Cagayan de Oro.

Additionally, TG Guingona filed the following bills for the advancement of the healthcare system in the Philippines:

- S.B. 2583: Comprehensive Nursing Bill which proposes to increase the entry level salary of registered nurses throughout the Philippines and create a Professional Regulatory Board of Nursing to supervise and regulate the practice of the nursing profession.
- S.B. 2473: The Philippine Medical Technology Bill which aims to modernize the medical technology profession and ensure the global competitiveness of medical technologists through the creation of a Technical Committee for Medical Technology Education under the Commission of Higher Education (CHED) and a homogenous Professional Regulatory Board of Medical Technology. These would be responsible for the regulation and maintenance of high standards in the practice of the profession, as well as the protection of the interests of medical technologists. The bill also updates the program of studies to include modern technology and prescribes that the minimum base pay of registered medical technologists should not be lower than an amount equivalent to Salary Grade 15 under the Compensation and Position Classification Act of 1989.
- S.B. 2654: The Health Facilities Regulation Bill which authorizes the Bureau of Health Facilities and Services under the Department of Health (DOH) to serve as the regulatory body of all healthcare facilities in the Philippines, especially with the emergence of new types of healthcare facilities such as diagnostic, therapeutic, and rehabilitative centers that do not qualify under the regular mandate of the DOH. This is to ensure that these facilities are capable of reaching a standard of adequacy and are capable of delivering quality health services with the expanding health insurance coverage in the Philippines.
- S.B. 3008: The Palliative and Hospice Care Bill which seeks to make the Filipino culture of caring for sick family members a fundamental element of the Philippine healthcare system by embedding palliative care into the core curricula of all new health professionals and providing trainings to health professionals, volunteers, and the general public. The bill aims to further grant more Filipinos access to quality health services by encouraging the development of home-based palliative and hospice care programs, and directing PhilHealth to increase its benefit package to include in-patient, outpatient, and home-based palliative and hospice care. This bill also recognizes the sacrifices of relatives by allowing them to use all their existing leave benefits granted by public and private employers on days they need to tend to sick family members.

==== Transparency and accountability in government ====
As chairperson of the Senate Committee on Accountability of Public Officers and Investigations or more commonly known as the Senate Blue Ribbon Committee, TG Guingona investigated the following cases of wrongdoings on the part of the government, its officials, and its attached agencies in aid of legislation:

- Armed Forces of the Philippines (AFP) Corruption Scandal or Pabaon Scandal - An investigation into the military corruption exposé as revealed by whistleblower, former Col. George Rabusa, involving the misuse of PhP1.5 billion military funds by high-ranking members of the AFP.
- Plea Bargaining Agreement between the Office of the Ombudsman Merceditas Gutierrez and Major General Carlos Garcia - An investigation into the allegations that unjust and illegal circumstances surrounding the plea bargaining agreement between Ombudsman Merceditas Gutierrez and former military comptroller Major General Carlos Garcia which allowed Garcia to plead to lesser offenses in exchange for the dismissal of plunder charges against him. The Senate Blue Ribbon Committee recommended the impeachment Gutierrez over gross negligence in the arrangement of the plea bargaining agreement under unjust and illegal circumstances. This resulted to the resignation of the former Ombudsman in 2011.
- Philippine Charity Sweepstakes Office (PCSO) Intelligence Fund Scam - An investigation into the alleged anomalous PCSO transactions committed during the administration of former President Gloria Macapagal-Arroyo and the excessive and improper use of its public funds. As a result of the probe, the hospital arrest of Gloria Macapagal-Arroyo was ordered over the plunder charges against her for the irregularities in the use and disposition of the intelligence funds of the PCSO.
- Philippine National Police (PNP) Helicopter Scam - An investigation into the sale of secondhand helicopters previously owned by former First Gentleman Jose Miguel "Mike" Arroyo to the PNP which were fictitiously priced as brand new and the consequent breach of duties by PNP officials to accommodate the anomalous sale. As a result of the probe, criminal charges were filed before the Sandiganbayan against former First Gentleman Arroyo and his co-accused over the anomalous sale.
- Sex for Flight Scandal - An investigation into the reports that overseas Filipino workers (OFW) in the Middle East were made to perform sexual favors to officials of the Philippine Embassy in exchange for plane tickets back to the Philippines.
- Priority Development Assistance Fund (PDAF) Scam or Pork Barrel Scam - An investigation into the alleged misuse of various lawmakers' PDAF or pork barrel funds by funneling PhP10 billion to ghost projects of bogus non-government organizations (NGO) in exchange for hefty kickbacks. The Senate Blue Ribbon Committee recommended the filing of plunder charges against the scam's mastermind, Janet Lim-Napoles, along with other involved government officials and private individuals.
- Iloilo Convention Center (ICC) Construction - An investigation into allegations of corruption involving the overpriced construction of the Iloilo Convention Center worth PhP679.8 million.
- Malampaya Fund Scam - An investigation into the embezzlement of PhP900 million from the Malampaya Fund. The Malampaya Fund represents the royalties that the government collects from the Malampaya gas project which involves the extraction of natural gas from the waters of Palawan.
- The Philippine Health Insurance Corporation (PhilHealth) Eye Center Scam - An investigation into the reported suspicious claims of hospitals and clinics with PhilHealth amounting to PhP2 billion, including PhP325 million worth of highly suspicious cataract benefit packages claimed by two (2) eye centers in Metro Manila.
- Armed Forces of the Philippines (AFP) Modernization Scam - An investigation into the purchase of twenty-one (21) helicopters by the Department of National Defense (DND) in connection with the AFP Modernization Program brought about by the report of whistleblower and Bureau of Internal Revenue (BIR) employee Rhodora Alvarez. The report revealed that the procurement process of these helicopters was manipulated to favor Rice Aircraft Services, Inc. (RASI) in exchange for kickbacks.
- Bangladesh Bank Cyber Heist - An investigation into the $81 million fund from Bangladesh Bank's account with the Federal Reserve Bank of New York that was stolen by hackers and coursed through the Philippines.

As the nature of the Senate Blue Ribbon Committee is to conduct investigations in aid of legislation, the following were legislated by TG Guingona to address the discovered lapses in existing laws and government procedures:

- The Sandiganbayan Act which aims to address the resolution of graft and corruption cases in the Philippines by increasing the number of divisions in the Sandiganbayan, rationalizing its procedures, and expanding its capacity to eliminate graft and corruption in the government in a timely and efficient manner to ensure that justice will be implemented with the highest level of integrity.
- The Anti-Money Laundering Act which gives the Anti-Money Laundering Council (AMLC) the power to inquire into bank deposits ex parte (without notice) upon the order of any competent court in cases of violation of the Anti-Money Laundering Act when there is probable cause that deposits or investments are related to an unlawful activity.
- S.B. 74: The People's Freedom of Information Bill which mandates the disclosure of information from all government agencies in relation to their budget, procurement, transactions, and other pertinent information regarding government agencies to any member of the public.
- S.B. 77: Plea Bargaining Bill which sets clear guidelines on plea bargain deals in criminal cases such as requiring the court to carefully inquire into the circumstances and motivations of plea bargaining and, in cases of plunder and money laundering, requiring the consent of the President of the Philippines and the Ombudsman. This is to ensure that plea bargaining will not be exploited as procedure of compromise for the convenience of the accused, but utilized for the paramount public interest of justice.
- S.B. 3350: Abolishing Regular Mandatory Contributions of the Philippine Charity Sweepstakes Office (PCSO) which seeks to repeal all laws that allocate PCSO funds to various national programs that are irrelevant to the mandate of the PCSO. The mandate of PCSO is to raise funds for health programs, medical assistance and services, and charities of national character.
- S.B. 3356: Strengthening the Philippine Charity Sweepstakes Office (PCSO) Charter which amends the PCSO Charter and delegates the management and implementation of its health program to the Department of Social Welfare and Development (DSWD) in order for PCSO to focus singularly in revenue generation as provided by its mandate.
- S.B. 1086 and 3003: The Anti-Graft and Corrupt Practices Bill which imposes stricter penalties against those found guilty of graft and corruption, such as increasing the prescriptive period of graft and corruption offenses to ensure that the right of the State to recover properties illegally acquired by a public officer may be better exercised.
- S.B. 76 and 3375: The Government Procurement Reform Bill which amends the Government Procurement Reform Act and expands the list of offenses listed in the existing law; making the recommendation, approval, and/or awarding of a government contract to a bidder that is not legally, technically, and/or financially capable punishable.
- S.B. 2375: Non-Government Organizations (NGO) Accreditation for Government Fund Releases Bill which seeks to prevent bogus NGOs and people's organizations from accessing public funds (PO) by setting a strict accreditation and validation system to monitor NGOs and POs that wish to participate in government contracts, as well as requiring a government audit of NGOs and POs that receive government funds.

==== Protection of human rights through legislation ====
As chairperson of the Senate Committee on Peace, Unification, and Reconciliation, Guingona led the Senate investigations on the Lumad killings in Surigao del Sur and pushed for the passage of the Bangsamoro Basic Law (BBL) or the Bangsamoro Organic Law which established the Bangsamoro Autonomous Region in Muslim Mindanao (BARMM). Following the agreements set forth in the final peace agreement signed between the Philippine government and the Moro Islamic Liberation Front (MILF), the Bangsamoro Basic Law addresses the Muslim people's quest for self-determination and paves the way for lasting peace in Mindanao after decades of violent conflict

TG Guingona also passed the Human Rights Victims Reparation and Recognition Act and Joint Resolution No. 3: Extending Period of Claims for Reparation of Human Rights Violations Victims which allows the State to formally recognize and compensate human rights victims of martial law under the Marcos regime, and extends the deadline for the filing of claims of martial law victims by six months, respectively.

Additionally, TG Guingona filed the following bills directed to alleviate poverty, protect the rights of internally displaced persons, and boost the Philippine government's disaster preparedness and response:

- S.B. 2888: The Social Security Bill which provides a PhP2,000 across the board increase in monthly pensions under the Social Security System (SSS).
- S.B. 2960: Pantawid Pamilyang Pilipino Program Bill which seeks to make the Pantawid Pamilyang Pilipino Program (4Ps) under the Department of Social Welfare and Development (DSWD) permanent to improve poverty reduction while investing in the improvement of human capabilities of those living in poverty. Under the 4Ps, and indigent family beneficiary receives a monthly cash subsidy when they meet DSWD's conditions such as improved class attendance rates for children and regular health checkups for children and pregnant women.
- S.B. 2368: The Rights of Internally Displaced Persons (IDP) Bill which promotes and protects the rights and dignities of IDPs. IDPs are those who voluntarily leave their homes or places of residences within the Philippines due to insurgencies and natural and man-made calamities. As IDPs are especially vulnerable to exploitation and violence, this bill details the rights and entitlements of IDPs, penalizes their infringement, and prohibits acts of arbitrary internal displacement.
- S.B. 2753: Solidarity Fund Bill which aims to intensify disaster preparedness and response by setting up a pooled fund to be shared among local government units (LGU) when calamities strike. In turn, the fund will be accessible to an LGU in a declared state of calamity when their own quick response fund has been depleted. The bill recognizes that local communities are frontliners when disasters strike, and that their actions, when done correctly and funded sufficiently, can save lives and properties.

==== Laws passed as senator of the Philippines ====
1. R.A. 10368: Human Rights Victims Reparation and Recognition Act of 2012
2. R.A. 10168: Terrorism Financing Prevention and Suppression Act of 2012
3. R.A. 10365: Anti-Money Laundering Act
4. R.A. 10167: Anti-Money Laundering Act
5. R.A. 10156: Career Service Professional Eligibility
6. R.A. 10557: Philippine Design Competitiveness Act of 2013
7. R.A. 10390: An Act Revitalizing the People's Television Network, Incorporated
8. R.A. 10645: The Expanded Senior Citizens Act
9. R.A. 10556: The Araw ng Pagbasa Act of 2011
10. R.A. 10660: Sandiganbayan Act
11. R.A. 10667: Philippine Competition Act
12. R.A. 10669: Jesse Robredo Day
13. R.A. 10677: Northern Mindanao Medical Center
14. R.A. 10678: Davao Regional Medical Center
15. R.A. 10770: Vicente Sotto Memorial Medical Center
16. R.A. 10747: Rare Diseases Act of the Philippines
17. R.A. 10752: Right-of-Way Act
18. R.A. 10767: Comprehensive Tuberculosis Elimination Act

==== Senate committee assignments ====
===== Committee chairmanship =====
1. Accountability of Public Officers and Investigations (Blue Ribbon)
2. Health and Demography
3. Peace, Unification, and Reconciliation
4. Congressional Oversight Committee on the Anti-Money Laundering Act

===== Committee vice chairmanship =====
1. Banks, Financial Institutions, and Currencies
2. Education, Arts, and Culture
3. Congressional Oversight Committee on Quality Affordable Medicines
4. Select Oversight Committee on Intelligence and Confidential Funds

===== Sub-committee chairmanship =====
Sub-committee on the Anti-Money Laundering Act (Committee on Banks, Financial Institutions, and Currencies)

===== Committee memberships =====
1. Economic Affairs
2. Electoral Reform and People's Participation
3. Energy
4. Finance
5. Foreign Relations
6. Government Corporations and Public Enterprises
7. Justice and Human Rights
8. National Defense and Security
9. Labor, Employment, and Human Resources Development
10. Public Works
11. Rules
12. Trade, Commerce, and Entrepreneurship
13. Urban Planning, Housing, and Resettlement
14. Ways and Means
15. Appointments
16. Joint Congressional Power Commission
17. Joint Congressional Oversight Committee on Public Expenditures
18. Constitutional Amendments and Revision of Codes

== Legislative track record ==
1. R.A. 9500: The University of the Philippines Charter of 2008
2. R.A. 9497: Civil Aviation Authority Act of 2008
3. R.A. 9745: The Anti-Torture Act of 2009
4. R.A. 9996: The Mindanao Development Authority (MinDA) Act of 2010
5. R.A. 10121: The Philippine Disaster Risk Reduction and Management Act of 2010
6. R.A. 9576: An Act Strengthening the Financial Capabilities of the Philippine Deposit Insurance Corporation (PDIC)
7. R.A. 10368: Human Rights Reparation and Recognition Act of 2012
8. R.A. 10168: Terrorism Financing Prevention and Suppression Act of 2012
9. R.A. 10365: Anti-Money Laundering Act
10. R.A. 10167: Anti-Money Laundering Act
11. R.A. 10156: Career Service Professional Eligibility
12. R.A. 10557: Philippine Design Competitiveness Act of 2013
13. R.A. 10390: An Act Revitalizing the People's Television Network, Inc.
14. R.A. 10645: The Expanded Senior Citizens Act
15. R.A. 10556: The Araw ng Pagbasa Act of 2011
16. R.A. 10660: Sandiganbayan Act
17. R.A. 10667: Philippine Competition Act
18. R.A. 10669: Jesse Robredo Day
19. R.A. 10677: Northern Mindanao Medical Center
20. R.A. 10770: Vicente Sotto Memorial Center
21. R.A. 10747: Rare Diseases Act of the Philippines
22. R.A. 10752: Right-of-Way Act
23. R.A. 10767: Comprehensive Tuberculosis Elimination Plan Act

== Notes ==
Preceded by Berthobal R. Ancheta	Representative, 2nd District of Bukidnon; June 30, 2004–June 30, 2010	Succeeded by Florencio T. Flores Jr.
