= List of presidents of the Philippines by province =

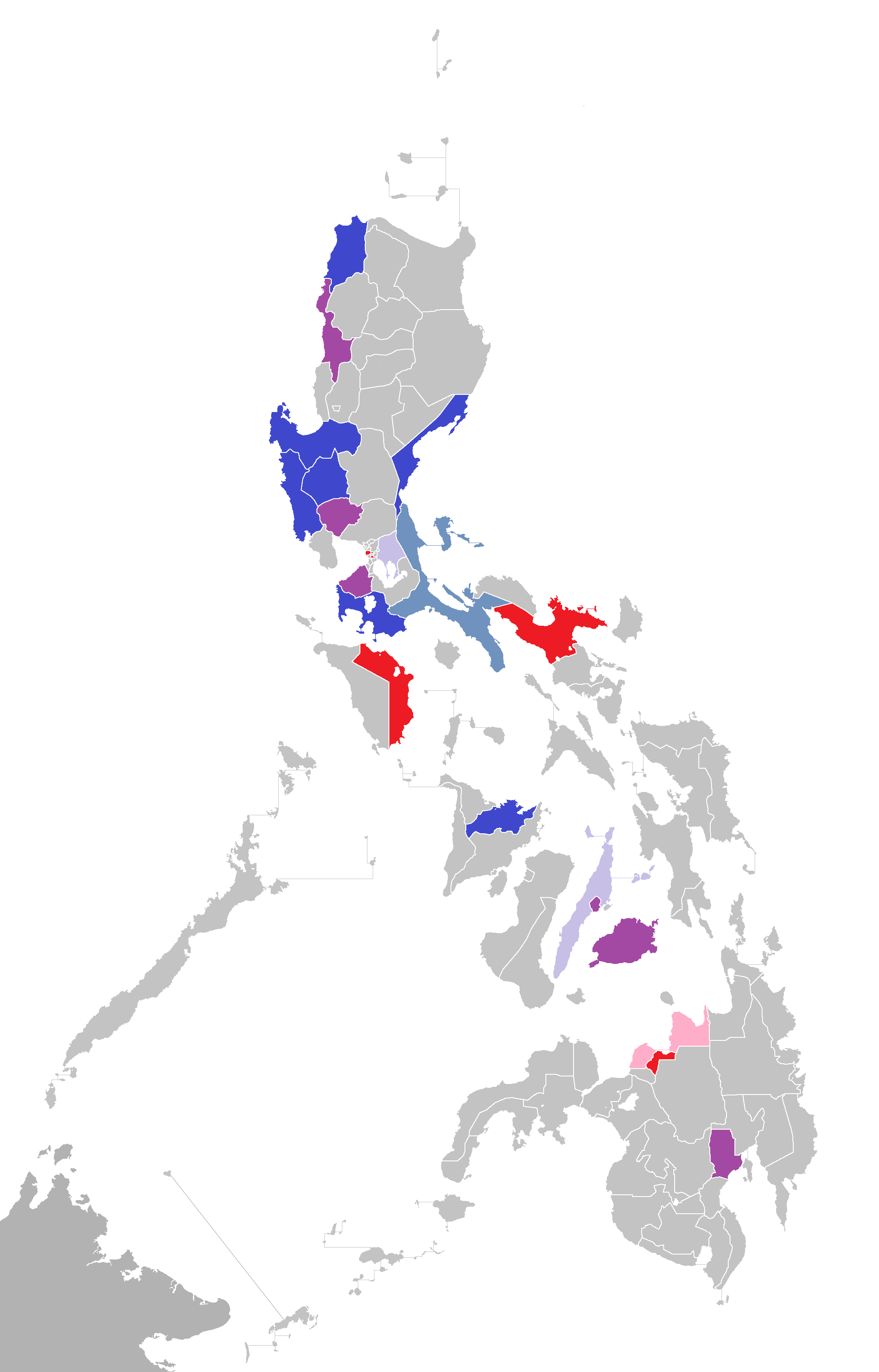
Home provinces of the presidents (blue) & vice presidents (red). Provinces that are home of both presidents and vice presidents are in purple.

These lists give the provinces of primary affiliation, and of birth for each president of the Philippines, consisting of the 17 heads of state in the history of the Philippines.

== Provinces of primary affiliation ==
A list of presidents of the Philippines including the province with which each was primarily affiliated, due to residence, professional career, and electoral history. This is not necessarily the province in which the president was born.

=== Provinces of primary affiliation by president ===
OP	President	Province
1	Emilio Aguinaldo	Cavite
2	Manuel L. Quezon	Aurora
3	José P. Laurel	Batangas
4	Sergio Osmeña	Cebu
5	Manuel Roxas	Capiz
6	Elpidio Quirino	Ilocos Sur
7	Ramon Magsaysay	Zambales
8	Carlos P. Garcia	Bohol
9	Diosdado Macapagal	Pampanga
10	Ferdinand Marcos	Ilocos Norte
11	Corazon Aquino	Tarlac and Rizal
12	Fidel Ramos	Pangasinan
13	Joseph Estrada	Metro Manila & Laguna
14	Gloria Macapagal Arroyo	Pampanga
15	Benigno Aquino III	Tarlac and Rizal
16	Rodrigo Duterte	Davao del Sur, Cebu and Southern Leyte
17	Bongbong Marcos	Ilocos Norte

=== Presidents with primary residence outside of birth province ===
Of the 16 individuals who have served as president of the Philippines, 4 served after officially residing in a different province than the one in which they were born from.

President	Birth province	Home province
Gloria Macapagal Arroyo	Rizal	Pampanga
Benigno Aquino III	Metro Manila	Tarlac and Rizal
Rodrigo Duterte	Leyte	Davao del Sur
Bongbong Marcos	Metro Manila	Ilocos Norte

=== Presidents by province of primary affiliation ===
Presidents with an asterisk (*) did not primarily reside in their respective province of primary affiliation from (they were not born in the province listed below).

Province	Number of presidents	Presidents (#th president of the Philippines)
Ilocos Norte	2	Ferdinand Marcos (10), Bongbong Marcos* (17)
Pampanga	2	Diosdado Macapagal (9), Gloria Macapagal Arroyo* (14)
Tarlac and Rizal	2	Corazon Aquino (11), Benigno Aquino III* (15)
Aurora	1	Manuel L. Quezon (2)
Batangas	1	José P. Laurel (3)
Bohol	1	Carlos P. Garcia (8)
Capiz	1	Manuel Roxas (5)
Cavite	1	Emilio Aguinaldo (1)
Cebu	1	Sergio Osmeña (4)
Davao del Sur, Cebu and Southern Leyte	1	Rodrigo Duterte* (16)
Ilocos Sur	1	Elpidio Quirino (6)
Metro Manila and Laguna	1	Joseph Estrada (13)
Pangasinan	1	Fidel Ramos (12)
Zambales	1	Ramon Magsaysay (7)

== Birth places ==
A list of birthplaces of presidents of the Philippines. As of January 2026, 13 modern-day provinces, along with the National Capital Region, claim the distinction of being the birthplace of a president.

The number of presidents born per modern-day province are:

- One: Aurora, Batangas, Bohol, Capiz, Cavite, Cebu, Ilocos Norte, Ilocos Sur, Pampanga, Pangasinan, Southern Leyte, Tarlac, and Zambales
- Four: Metro Manila
Birthplaces of presidents of the Philippines. Presidents born in modern-day Metro Manila are shown separately.
Birthplaces of presidents of the Philippines in modern-day Metro Manila

Names sort in order of birth Dates sort by month and day
President	Date of birth	Birthplace	Province of birth	In office
Emilio Aguinaldo	March 22, 1869	Cavite el Viejo (Aguinaldo Shrine)	Cavite	January 23, 1899 – March 23, 1901
Manuel L. Quezon	August 19, 1878	Baler	Nueva Ecija	November 15, 1935 – August 1, 1944
Sergio Osmeña	September 9, 1878	Cebu City	Cebu	August 1, 1944 – May 28, 1946
Elpidio Quirino	November 16, 1890	Vigan	Ilocos Sur	April 17, 1948 – December 30, 1953
José P. Laurel	March 9, 1891	Tanauan	Batangas	October 14, 1943 – August 17, 1945
Manuel Roxas	January 1, 1892	Capiz	Capiz	May 28, 1946 – April 15, 1948
Carlos P. Garcia	November 4, 1896	Talibon	Bohol	March 18, 1957 – December 30, 1961
Ramon Magsaysay	August 31, 1907	Iba	Zambales	December 30, 1953 – March 17, 1957
Diosdado Macapagal	September 28, 1910	Lubao	Pampanga	December 30, 1961 – December 30, 1965
Ferdinand Marcos	September 11, 1917	Sarrat	Ilocos Norte	December 30, 1965 – February 25, 1986
Fidel Ramos	March 18, 1928	Lingayen	Pangasinan	June 30, 1992 – June 30, 1998
Corazon Aquino	January 25, 1933	Paniqui	Tarlac	February 25, 1986 – June 30, 1992
Joseph Estrada	April 19, 1937	Manila	Metro Manila	June 30, 1998 – January 20, 2001
Rodrigo Duterte	March 28, 1945	Maasin	Leyte	June 30, 2016 – June 30, 2022
Gloria Macapagal Arroyo	April 5, 1947	San Juan	Rizal	January 20, 2001 – June 30, 2010
Bongbong Marcos	September 13, 1957	Manila	Metro Manila	June 30, 2022 – incumbent
Benigno Aquino III	February 8, 1960	Manila	Metro Manila	June 30, 2010 – June 30, 2016

Province		President
Metro Manila	4	Joseph Estrada
Metro Manila	4	Gloria Macapagal Arroyo
Metro Manila	4	Benigno Aquino III
Metro Manila	4	Bongbong Marcos
Aurora	1	Manuel L. Quezon
Batangas	1	José P. Laurel
Bohol	1	Carlos P. Garcia
Capiz	1	Manuel Roxas
Cavite	1	Emilio Aguinaldo
Cebu	1	Sergio Osmeña
Ilocos Norte	1	Ferdinand Marcos
Ilocos Sur	1	Elpidio Quirino
Pampanga	1	Diosdado Macapagal
Pangasinan	1	Fidel Ramos
Southern Leyte	1	Rodrigo Duterte
Tarlac	1	Corazon Aquino
Zambales	1	Ramon Magsaysay

== See also ==
- List of vice presidents of the Philippines by place of primary affiliation
