= List of vice presidents of the Philippines =

The official seal of the vice president of the Philippines

The vice president of the Philippines is the second-highest executive official in the government of the Philippines. The vice president is directly elected by qualified voters to a six-year term, and may be a cabinet member without confirmation from the Commission on Appointments and is first in the presidential line of succession.

The incumbent vice president is Sara Duterte, who assumed office on June 30, 2022.

== History ==
The office of vice president was initially created following the ratification of the 1935 Constitution of the Philippines, which states that the vice president shall be elected by direct vote of the people. Vice presidents during the Commonwealth of the Philippines were under American sovereignty, and there was no office of vice president during the Second Republic, which was considered to be a puppet state of Imperial Japan during World War II. During the martial law declared by President Ferdinand Marcos from 1972 to 1981, the office of the vice president was abolished and the sitting vice president, Fernando Lopez, was removed from the office. Though the 1973 Constitution initially did not provide for a vice president, subsequent amendments restored the office. A vice president was appointed after the 1986 election when Marcos and Arturo Tolentino were proclaimed as winners by the Batasang Pambansa. However, in 1986, the People Power Revolution overthrew Marcos' dictatorship and repealed the 1973 Constitution. In 2013, the National Historical Commission of the Philippines through Resolution No. 2, series of 2013 declared that Tolentino is not part of the official list of vice presidents of the Philippines. The subsequently formed 1987 Constitution of the Philippines was established, which states that: "There shall be a vice-president who shall have the same qualifications and term of office and be elected with, and in the same manner, as the president."

Before the ratification of the 1987 Constitution, in case of an intra-term vacancy, there was no process to appoint a new vice president until after the next election. However, after the ratification of the 1987 constitution, the president could nominate a vice president in case of an intra-term vacancy from a member of the congress, whom both houses vote separately for confirmation by a majority vote. In 2001, Gloria Macapagal Arroyo became president after the Supreme Court of the Philippines ruled that President Joseph Estrada resigned. A few days later, she appointed Teofisto Guingona as the vice president. Guingona is the only person being unelected to the position.

Three vice presidents have succeeded to the presidency due to the death of presidents: Sergio Osmeña in 1944, Elpidio Quirino in 1948, and Carlos P. Garcia in 1957. Fernando Lopez was the longest-serving vice president, who served for a combined total of almost 11 years. Elpidio Quirino served the shortest time as vice president for approximately 1 year and 11 months.

== List of vice presidents ==
No.	Portrait	Name (Lifespan)	Term start	Term end	Term length	Party	Election	President
1		Sergio Osmeña (1878–1961)	November 15, 1935	August 1, 1944 (Note: Succeeded to the presidency.)	8 years, 260 days	Nacionalista	1935	Manuel L. Quezon
1		Sergio Osmeña (1878–1961)	November 15, 1935	August 1, 1944	8 years, 260 days	Nacionalista	1941 (Note: Sergio Osmeña's second term was supposed to end on December 30, 1943. However, Joint Resolution No. 95 of the United States Congress was approved on November 12, 1943, to extend Osmeña's term due to the Japanese occupation of the Philippines.)	Manuel L. Quezon
Vacant (Note: The 1935 Constitution did not provide for the filling of a vacancy in the vice presidency.) (August 1, 1944 – May 28, 1946)								Sergio Osmeña
2		Elpidio Quirino (1890–1956)	May 28, 1946	April 17, 1948	1 year, 323 days	Liberal	1946	Manuel Roxas
Vacant (April 17, 1948 – December 30, 1949)								Elpidio Quirino
3		Fernando Lopez (1904–1993)	December 30, 1949	December 30, 1953	4 years	Liberal (until 1953)	1949	Elpidio Quirino
3		Fernando Lopez (1904–1993)	December 30, 1949	December 30, 1953	4 years	Democratic (from 1953)	1949	Elpidio Quirino
4		Carlos P. Garcia (1896–1971)	December 30, 1953	March 18, 1957	3 years, 78 days	Nacionalista	1953	Ramon Magsaysay
Vacant (March 18, 1957 – December 30, 1957)								Carlos P. Garcia
5		Diosdado Macapagal (1910–1997)	December 30, 1957	December 30, 1961	4 years	Liberal	1957	Carlos P. Garcia
6		Emmanuel Pelaez (1915–2003)	December 30, 1961	December 30, 1965	4 years	Liberal (until 1964)	1961	Diosdado Macapagal
6		Emmanuel Pelaez (1915–2003)	December 30, 1961	December 30, 1965	4 years	Nacionalista (from 1964)	1961	Diosdado Macapagal
7		Fernando Lopez (1904–1993)	December 30, 1965	January 17, 1973	7 years, 18 days	Nacionalista	1965	Ferdinand Marcos
7		Fernando Lopez (1904–1993)	December 30, 1965	January 17, 1973	7 years, 18 days	Nacionalista	1969	Ferdinand Marcos
Position abolished (Note: The 1973 Constitution did not provide for a vice presidency.) (January 17, 1973 – January 27, 1984)								Ferdinand Marcos
Vacant (Note: The 1973 Constitution was amended in 1984 to provide for a vice presidency. However, a vice presidential election was not called until 1986.) (January 27, 1984 – February 25, 1986)								Ferdinand Marcos
8		Salvador Laurel (1928–2004)	February 25, 1986	June 30, 1992	6 years, 126 days	UNIDO (until 1988)	1986 (Note: In the 1986 vice presidential election, Arturo Tolentino was declared the winner by the Batasang Pambansa based on the results from the Commission on Elections, while Salvador Laurel was declared the winner by the National Citizens' Movement for Free Elections. The fraudulent conduct and disputed result of the election led to the People Power Revolution, resulting in Laurel's assumption of the vice presidency.)	Corazon Aquino
8		Salvador Laurel (1928–2004)	February 25, 1986	June 30, 1992	6 years, 126 days	Nacionalista (from 1988)	1986	Corazon Aquino
9		Joseph Estrada (born 1937)	June 30, 1992	June 30, 1998	6 years	NPC (until 1997)	1992	Fidel V. Ramos
9		Joseph Estrada (born 1937)	June 30, 1992	June 30, 1998	6 years	LAMMP (from 1997)	1992	Fidel V. Ramos
10		Gloria Macapagal Arroyo (born 1947)	June 30, 1998	January 20, 2001	2 years, 204 days	Lakas	1998	Joseph Estrada
Vacant (Note: The vice presidency was vacant from January 20 until February 7, 2001, after Gloria Macapagal Arroyo succeeded to the presidency upon Joseph Estrada's removal from office as a result of the Second EDSA Revolution.) (January 20 – February 7, 2001)								Gloria Macapagal Arroyo
11		Teofisto Guingona Jr. (born 1928)	February 7, 2001	June 30, 2004	3 years, 144 days	Lakas (until 2003)	2001 (Note: Appointed as vice president in accordance with Section 9 of Article VII of the 1987 Constitution.)	Gloria Macapagal Arroyo
11		Teofisto Guingona Jr. (born 1928)	February 7, 2001	June 30, 2004	3 years, 144 days	Independent (from 2003)	2001	Gloria Macapagal Arroyo
12		Noli de Castro (born 1949)	June 30, 2004	June 30, 2010	6 years	Independent	2004	Gloria Macapagal Arroyo
13		Jejomar Binay (born 1942)	June 30, 2010	June 30, 2016	6 years	PDP–Laban (until 2012)	2010	Benigno Aquino III
13		Jejomar Binay (born 1942)	June 30, 2010	June 30, 2016	6 years	UNA (from 2012)	2010	Benigno Aquino III
14		Leni Robredo (born 1965)	June 30, 2016	June 30, 2022	6 years	Liberal	2016	Rodrigo Duterte
15		Sara Duterte (born 1978)	June 30, 2022	Incumbent	4 years, 41 days	Lakas (until 2023)	2022	Bongbong Marcos
15		Sara Duterte (born 1978)	June 30, 2022	Incumbent	4 years, 41 days	HNP (Note: Sara Duterte was affiliated with both Lakas and Hugpong ng Pagbabago (HNP) at election. She remained with HNP after resigning from Lakas–CMD on May 19, 2023.) (from 2023)	2022	Bongbong Marcos

== Living former vice presidents ==
Living former vice presidents showing periods in office with dates of birth and age and current position in government

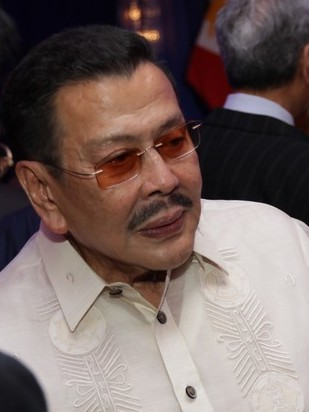
Joseph Estrada
(1992–1998)
April 19, 1937
None (retired)

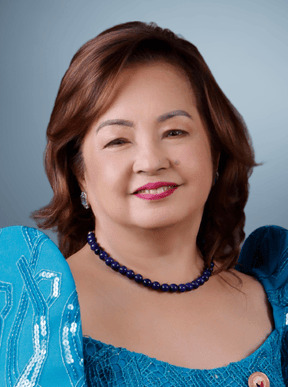
Gloria Macapagal Arroyo
(1998–2001)
April 5, 1947
Representative of Pampanga's 2nd district

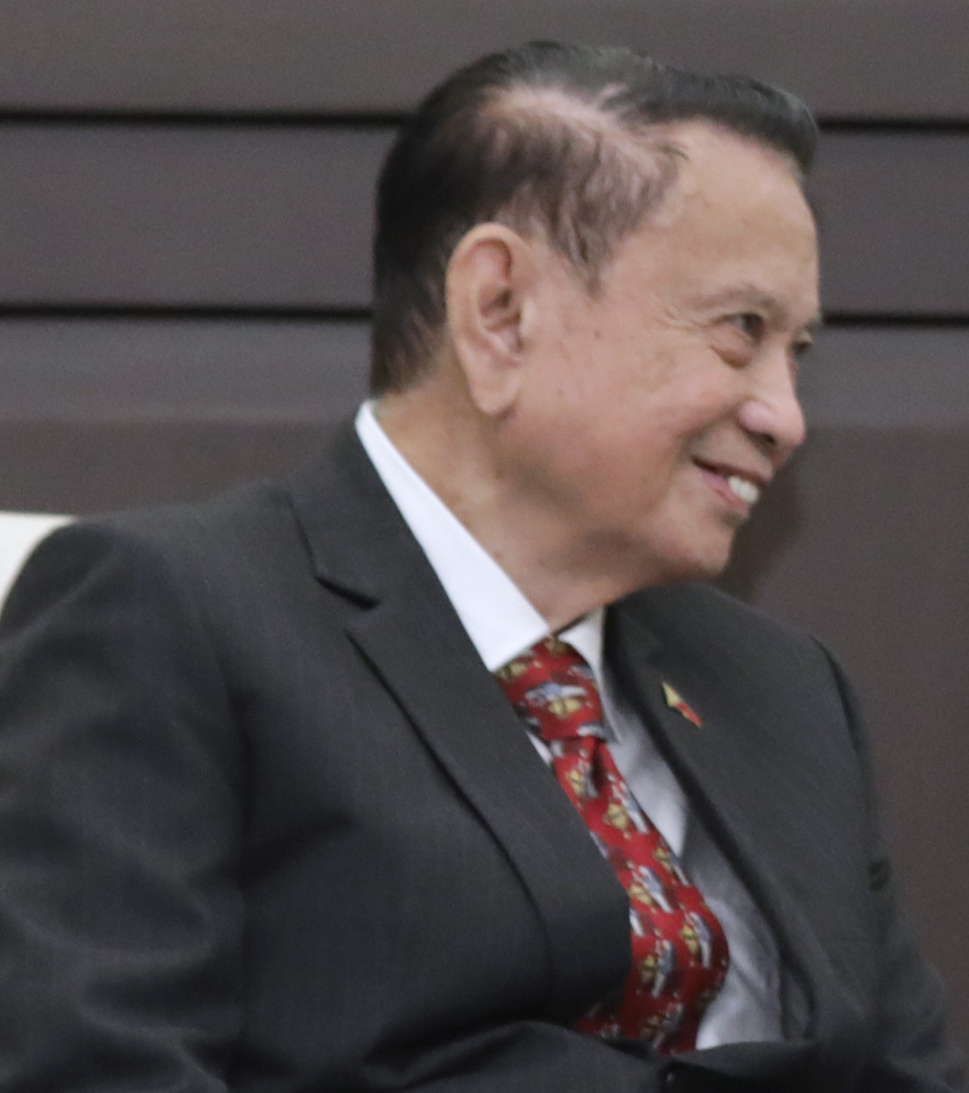
Teofisto Guingona Jr.
(2001–2004)
July 4, 1928
None (retired)

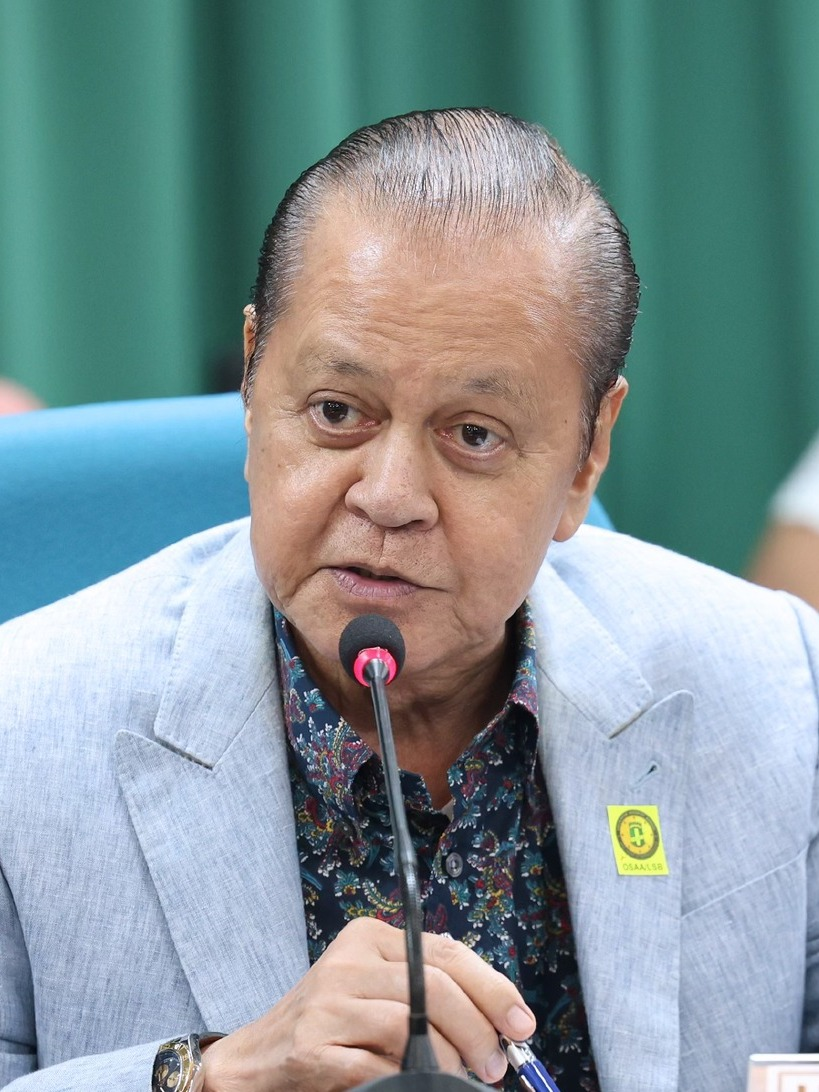
Noli de Castro
(2004–2010)
July 6, 1949
None (retired)

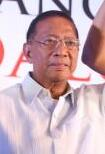
Jejomar Binay
(2010–2016)
November 11, 1942
None (retired)

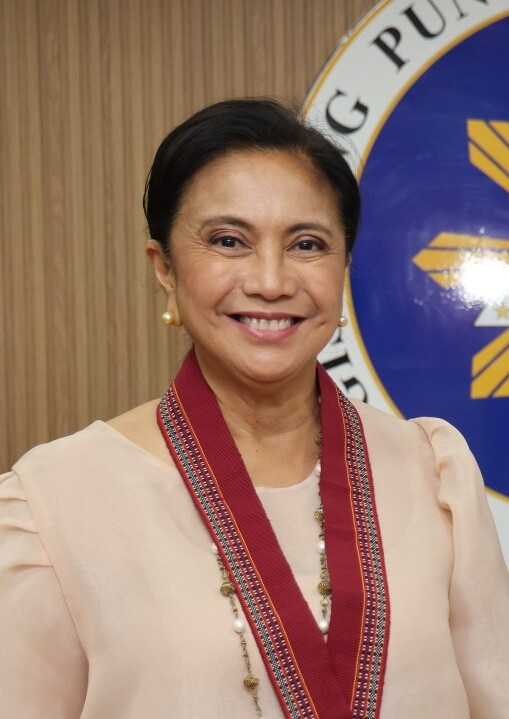
Leni Robredo
(2016–2022)
April 23, 1965
Mayor of Naga, Camarines Sur

== Unofficial vice presidents ==
Historians and other figures have identified the following people as having held the vice presidency of a government intended to represent the Philippines, but their terms of office are not counted by the Philippine government as part of the presidential succession.

The inclusion of Mariano Trías in the list is disputed, because Trias was chosen as vice president at the Tejeros Convention, and again as vice president for the short-lived Republic of Biak-na-Bato, which was dissolved after the signing of the Pact of Biak-na-Bato and Aguinaldo's exile. Neither the reassumption of power by Emilio Aguinaldo when the revolution was resumed in May 1898 nor his formal proclamation and inauguration as president under the First Philippine Republic in 1899 were regimes that provided for a vice presidency.

Portrait	Name (Lifespan)	Term start	Term end	Term length	Party	Election	President	Era
	Mariano Trías (1868–1914)	March 22, 1897	January 23, 1899	1 year, 307 days	Nonpartisan (Note: Allied with the Magdalo faction of the revolutionary society Katipunan.)	1897	Emilio Aguinaldo	Tejeros Convention
	Mariano Trías (1868–1914)	March 22, 1897	January 23, 1899	1 year, 307 days	Nonpartisan	—	Emilio Aguinaldo	Republic of Biak-na-Bato
	Francisco Carreón (1868–1939/1941)	May 6, 1902	July 14, 1906 (Note: Term ended with his capture by the American Forces.)	4 years, 69 days	Nonpartisan	—	Macario Sakay	Tagalog Republic
	Ramón Avanceña (1872–1957)	October 14, 1943	January 15, 1944	93 days	KALIBAPI	—	Jose P. Laurel	Second Republic
	Benigno Aquino Sr. (1894–1947)	January 15, 1944	August 17, 1945	1 year, 272 days	KALIBAPI		Jose P. Laurel	Second Republic

== Vice presidents who later served as president ==
Vice president	President served under	Year(s) served	Notes
Sergio Osmeña	Manuel L. Quezon	1935–1944	Osmeña succeeded Quezon, after the latter's death
Elpidio Quirino	Manuel Roxas	1946–1948	Quirino succeeded Roxas, after the latter's death; ran and won a full term in 1949
Carlos P. Garcia	Ramon Magsaysay	1953–1957	Garcia succeeded Magsaysay, after the latter's death; ran and won a full term in 1957
Diosdado Macapagal	Carlos P. Garcia	1957–1961	Macapagal defeated Garcia in 1961
Joseph Estrada	Fidel V. Ramos	1992–1998	Estrada ran for a full term in 1998
Gloria Macapagal Arroyo	Joseph Estrada	1998–2001	Arroyo succeeded Estrada, after the latter's resignation; ran and won a full term in 2004

== See also ==
- President of the Philippines
- List of presidents of the Philippines
- Prime Minister of the Philippines (defunct)

== Works cited ==
Books and journals

- De Guzman, Raul P.; Reforma, Mila A., eds. (1988). Government and politics of the Philippines. Oxford University Press. ISBN 978-0-19-588871-3. LCCN 88001474. OL 2526300M.
- "Joseph Estrada". Economic and Political Weekly. ISSN 0012-9976.
- Ooi, Keat Gin (2004). Southeast Asia : A Historical Encyclopedia, from Angkor Wat to East Timor. ABC-CLIO. OCLC 1000411290.
- Rodell, Paul A. (2002). "The Philippines: Gloria 'in Excelsis". Southeast Asian Affairs. 2002: 215–236. JSTOR 27913210.
- Vellut, J. L. (1964). "Foreign Relations of the Second Republic of the Philippines, 1943–1945". Journal of Southeast Asian Studies. 5 (1). Cambridge University Press: 126–142. doi:10.1017/S0217781100002246. JSTOR 20067478.
- Zaide, Sonia M. (1999). The Philippines : A Unique Nation. All-Nations Publishing. ISBN 978-971-642-064-7. LCCN 2004420900. OL 3362336M.

Articles

- Cruz, Enrico Dela (June 19, 2022). "Duterte's daughter sworn in as Philippines vice president". Reuters.
- "Leni Robredo takes oath as 14th VP". ABS-CBNnews.com. June 30, 2016.
- "How Filipino People Power toppled dictator Marcos". BBC News. February 17, 2016.
- "A Rare Filipino Is at the Helm". Calgary Herald. December 14, 1961 – via Newspapers.com.
- "Philippines' Marcos Sworn In". Chicago Tribune. December 30, 1965 – via Newspapers.com.
- "Body of Filipino President Found in Plane Wreckage". Fort Worth Star-Telegram. March 18, 1957 – via Newspapers.com.
- "P.I. Congress Meeting Today To Canvass Election Returns". Guam Daily News. December 12, 1961. Archived from the original on November 18, 2021 – via Newspapers.com.
- Felongco, Gilbert (February 10, 2001). "Guingona sworn in as vice president". Gulf News.
- Briscoe, David (February 26, 1986). "Aquino's New Challenged: Communism, Popular Expectation". Hartford Courant. Archived from the original on November 18, 2021 – via Newspapers.com.
- "U.S. Disavows Jap Puppet Rule in Philippines". Los Angeles Times. October 23, 1943 – via Newspapers.com.
- Cupin, Bea (June 27, 2016). "VP to VP: Binay, Robredo meet ahead of inauguration". Rappler. Archived from the original on October 11, 2021.
- "Powers and Duties: President, Vice President of the Philippines". Rappler. April 27, 2021. Archived from the original on October 15, 2021.
- Cupin, Bea (November 4, 2021). "After backing out of Senate run, Noli de Castro returns to ABS-CBN". Rappler.
- Morales, Neil Jerome; Lema, Karen (October 7, 2021). "Philippine Vice President Robredo joins race for president". Reuters. Archived from the original on October 7, 2021.
- "Tears and Joy as Philippines Become Free". Spokane Chronicle. July 4, 1946 – via Newspapers.com.
- "Philippine's New Regime Launched". St. Louis Star-Times. November 14, 1935 – via Newspapers.com.
- "Arroyo Chooses Guingona as Philippine VP". Tehran Times. February 7, 2001.
- Wilkins, Ford (November 14, 1935). "Quezon, Philippine Political Genius, President in All But Title Since 1916". The Caledonian-Record – via Newspapers.com.
- "Filipino President Pledges Nation to Fight Communism". The Californian. December 3, 1949 – via Newspaper.com.
- "President Roxas of Philippines Dies After Speech Assailing Red Aggression". The Courier-Journal. April 16, 1948. Archived from the original on November 12, 2021 – via Newspapers.com.
- "MacArthur in Frank Works Warns Nation". The Decatur Daily. September 16, 1945 – via Newspapers.com.
- "Ball at Royal Hawaiian Hotel To Mark Filipino Inauguration". The Honolulu Advertiser. December 27, 1957. Archived from the original on November 18, 2021 – via Newspapers.com.
- Conde, Carlos H. (June 24, 2004). "Philippine Congress proclaims Arroyo winner". The New York Times.
- "Philippines: Rebels Agree to Cease-Fire". The New York Times. September 13, 2013.
- "Manila To Hail Third President". The Spokesman-Review. December 30, 1953 – via Newspapers.com.
- "Estrada Resigns as Philippine President; Vice President Is Immediately Sworn In". The Wall Street Journal. January 20, 2001.
- Wurfel, David (July 4, 1992). "Ramon Under The Gun As New President". The Windsor Star – via Newspapers.com.

Online sources

- "Joseph Estrada". Encyclopædia Britannica. April 15, 2021. Archived from the original on November 18, 2021.
- "Gloria Macapagal Arroyo". Encyclopædia Britannica. April 1, 2021. Archived from the original on November 18, 2021.
- "Francisco M. Carreón" (PDF). National Historical Institute of the Philippines. Archived from the original (PDF) on November 22, 2009.
- "The 1935 Constitution of the Republic of the Philippines". Official Gazette of the Republic of the Philippines. Archived from the original on May 27, 2020 – via Official Gazette( This article incorporates text from this source, which is in the public domain.)
- "The 1987 Constitution of the Republic of the Philippines". Official Gazette of the Republic of the Philippines. Archived from the original on January 5, 2019 – via Official Gazette( This article incorporates text from this source, which is in the public domain.)
- "Emmanuel Pelaez". Senate of the Philippines. Archived from the original on November 18, 2021.
- "Fernando Lopez". Senate of the Philippines. Archived from the original on September 21, 2020.
- "Gloria Macapagal Arroyo". Senate of the Philippines.
- "Joseph E. Estrada". Senate of the Philippines.
- "Teofisto T. Guingona Jr". Senate of the Philippines.
- "History – The History of the Philippine Vice Presidency – Chronology of Vice Presidents". Vice president of the Philippines( This article incorporates text from this source, which is in the public domain.)
