= Teofisto Guingona Jr. =

Vice President of the Philippines from 2001 to 2004

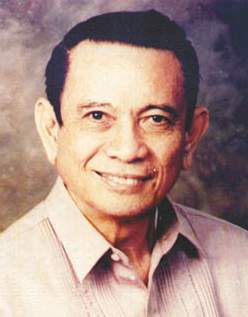
- Guingona in 2002

11th Vice President of the Philippines
- In office February 7, 2001 – June 30, 2004
- President: Gloria Macapagal Arroyo
- Preceded by: Gloria Macapagal Arroyo
- Succeeded by: Noli de Castro

Ambassador of the Philippines to China
- In office 2004 – July 8, 2005
- President: Gloria Macapagal Arroyo

Secretary of Foreign Affairs
- In office February 9, 2001 – July 2, 2002
- President: Gloria Macapagal Arroyo
- Preceded by: Domingo Siazon Jr.
- Succeeded by: Blas Ople

President pro tempore of the Senate of the Philippines
- In office January 18, 1993 – July 6, 1993
- Preceded by: Ernesto Maceda
- Succeeded by: Leticia Ramos-Shahani
- In office July 27, 1987 – July 23, 1990
- Preceded by: Senate re-established (Last held by Jose Roy)
- Succeeded by: Sotero Laurel

Senate Majority Leader
- In office July 23, 1990 – July 22, 1991
- Preceded by: Orly Mercado
- Succeeded by: Alberto Romulo

Senate Minority Leader
- In office July 27, 1998 – February 7, 2001
- Preceded by: Ernesto Maceda
- Succeeded by: Rene Cayetano

Senator of the Philippines
- In office June 30, 1998 – February 7, 2001
- In office June 30, 1987 – July 6, 1993

48th Secretary of Justice
- In office May 20, 1995 – January 31, 1998
- President: Fidel V. Ramos
- Preceded by: Demetrio Demetria
- Succeeded by: Silvestre Bello III

Executive Secretary
- In office July 6, 1993 – May 19, 1995
- President: Fidel V. Ramos
- Preceded by: Edelmiro Amante
- Succeeded by: Ruben Torres

Chairman of the Commission on Audit
- In office March 10, 1986 – March 1987
- President: Corazon Aquino
- Preceded by: Position established
- Succeeded by: Eufemio Domingo

President of the Chamber of Commerce of the Philippine Islands
- In office 1968–1969
- Preceded by: Teofilo Reyes Jr.
- Succeeded by: Rogelio Manalo

Personal details
- Born: Teofisto Tayko Guingona; July 4, 1928 (age 98) San Juan del Monte, Rizal, Philippine Islands
- Party: Independent (2003–present)
- Other political affiliations: Lakas–NUCD (1998–2003); LDP (1992–1998); Liberal (1987–1992); PDP–Laban (1983–1987); Laban (1978–1983)
- Spouse: Ruth de Lara (m. 1957)
- Children: 3, including Teofisto III
- Parents: Teofisto Guingona Sr. (father); Josefa Tayko (mother)
- Education: Ateneo de Manila University (AB, LL.B)

Teofisto "Tito" Tayko Guingona Jr. (born July 4, 1928) is a Filipino statesman, lawyer and diplomat who served as the 11th vice president of the Philippines from 2001 to 2004, during the first term of President Gloria Macapagal Arroyo. Born in San Juan (now a part of Metro Manila), he is a graduate of Ateneo de Manila University, where he was a working student.

Guingona was an active opposition figure during the martial law period under President Ferdinand Marcos, being jailed multiple times. After the assassination of Ninoy Aquino in 1983, Guingona joined his brother Butz Aquino in attending rallies and forming the organization BANDILA in 1985.

After the People Power Revolution, Guingona was appointed as chairman of the Commission on Audit by then newly installed President Corazon Aquino in 1986 until 1987, when he was elected as a senator of the Philippines under the coalition of Lakas ng Bayan, led by Aquino. While a senator, he also served as the director and chairman of the Mindanao Development Authority and the Mindanao Labor Management Advisory Council. He won in the reelections in 1992 and became the majority leader a year after, but his term ended prematurely when newly elected President Fidel V. Ramos appointed him as executive secretary from 1993 until 1995 and as justice secretary from 1995 until 1998. He was re-elected to the Senate again as a minority leader from 1998 until 2001.

Guingona was appointed vice president of the Philippines and secretary of foreign affairs by President Arroyo, after she assumed the presidency from the vice presidency after the ousting of President Joseph Estrada in the aftermath of the Second EDSA Revolution, making Guingona the only vice president who was not nationally elected to the position. When Guingona's term ended, he decided not to seek a full term election at the 2004 Philippine presidential election and was succeeded by Noli de Castro.

== Early life and education ==
Guingona was born on July 4, 1928, in San Juan del Monte, Rizal (present-day San Juan, Metro Manila). His father, Teofisto Guingona Sr., was a former assemblyman, senator, judge and commissioner from Guimaras, Iloilo. His mother, Josefa Tayko, is of Siaton, Negros Oriental. He grew up in the provinces Agusan, Lanao, and Misamis Oriental, where he completed his elementary schooling with honors in Ateneo de Cagayan. He pursued his studies at the Ateneo de Manila University as a working student, teaching history and political science while taking up courses in law and economics. He took up special studies in Public Administration, Economics, Sociology and Audit, in addition to playing a role in the new Aquila Legis fraternity (Second Batch 1950) becoming the most honorable Praeses or "bossman" in 1952-53 after founding bossman Joaquin Misa in 1949.

== Early career in government ==
After graduation, he went into business and became a governor of the Development Bank of the Philippines and president of the Chamber of Commerce of the Philippine Islands.

== Political career ==
Guingona was a delegate to the 1971 Constitutional Convention and, when martial law was declared in 1972 by President Ferdinand Marcos, he resisted the abuses of the regime, serving as a human rights lawyer. He founded SANDATA and became the honorary chairman of BANDILA, two mass-based organizations dedicated to social and economic reforms. Because of his opposition to martial rule he was jailed twice, first in 1972 and then in 1978.

=== Bayan; BANDILA ===
In May 1985, upon the establishment of the Bagong Alyansang Makabayan (or Bayan), Guingona was elected to its National Council. After two weeks, however, Guingona resigned from the council with Butz Aquino, with the two being reportedly uneasy about the growing influence of the CPP and its National Democratic Front (NDF) in the alliance. Guingona thus joined Aquino in forming a new organization called Bansang Nagkaisa sa Diwa at Layunin (BANDILA; lit. 'country united in spirit and objective'), for which he became its chairman. On February 4, 1986, Guingona called for the resignation of Philippine National Bank president Placido Mapa Jr. and the bank's board of directors for questionably selling the PANTRANCO North Express' assets while retaining its liabilities, which had led to the layoff of hundreds of PANTRANCO employees.

When Marcos was ousted in 1986 as a result of the People Power Revolution, newly installed President Corazon Aquino appointed Guingona as chairman of the Commission on Audit, where he gained renown as a graft buster.

=== Senate of the Philippines (1987–1993) ===
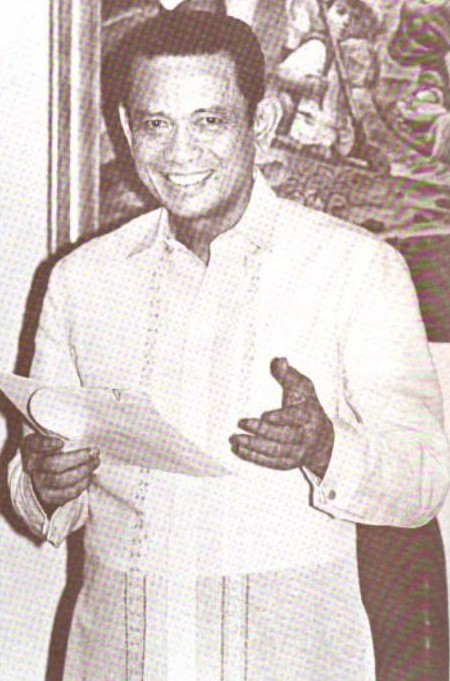
Guingona as a senator, photograph released by the Philippine Congress, c. 1988

Guingona was first elected to the Senate in 1987 under the Aquino-backed Lakas ng Bayan coalition. He was elected as Senate president pro tempore in 1987 and majority leader in 1990. Additionally, he served as director and chairman of the Mindanao Development Authority and the Mindanao Labor Management Advisory Council.

In 1992, Guingona ran for reelection under the Laban ng Demokratikong Pilipino of Speaker of the House Ramon Mitra Jr. He eventually won, placing 14th in the Senate race. In 1993, he rose to the position of majority floor leader once more, but President Fidel V. Ramos' appointment of him as executive secretary that same year ended his Senate tenure.

=== Executive secretary (1993–1995) and secretary of justice (1995–1998) ===
President Fidel V. Ramos appointed Guingona as executive secretary in 1993, replacing Edelmiro Amante, who resigned. In 1995, Guingona was appointed as justice secretary. As justice secretary, he rejuvenated the Witness Protection Program and established the Prosecution Academy. He also implemented the Katarungang Pambarangay, or the Barangay Justice System, and heightened public awareness of the Barangay Justice Program. He also held, in a concurrent capacity, the chairmanship of the Presidential Anti-Crime Commission.

=== Senate of the Philippines (1998–2001) ===
In 1998, he was elected back to the Senate under Lakas-NUCD and was elected as minority floor leader. Guingona was among the first to demand President Joseph Estrada resign in protest of the irregularities in his administration. He was among the senators that voted to open an envelope allegedly containing information that would implicate Estrada on January 17, 2001. The decision to keep the envelope closed was ultimately made by a vote of 11–10, which heightened anti-Estrada emotions and sparked a second uprising on EDSA. Vice President Gloria Macapagal Arroyo, who succeeded Estrada as president his removal from office, had Guingona as her top pick for vice president.

=== Vice presidency (2001–2004) ===
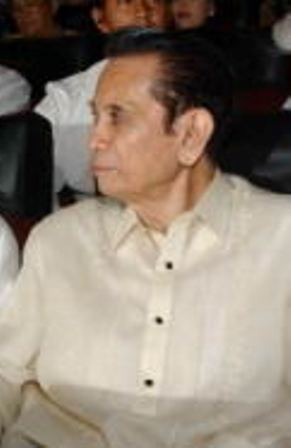
U.S embassy photo of Vice President Guingona

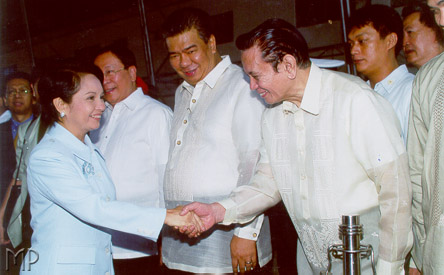
Vice President Guingona shaking his hand with President Gloria Macapagal Arroyo in 2001

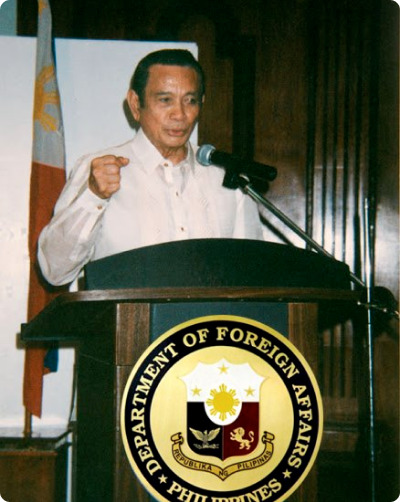
Vice President Guingona during his tenure as Secretary of Foreign Affairs

Following the Second EDSA Revolution in January 2001 that overthrew President Joseph Estrada, Guingona was nominated as vice president of the Philippines by Arroyo, who succeeded Estrada to the presidency, on February 7. His nomination was affirmed by Congress. Guingona is the only vice president who was not elected to the position. He is also the oldest person to have held the position, being appointed at the age of 72. He also concurrently served as secretary of foreign affairs.

During his time as vice president, he was often at odds with Arroyo, particularly over foreign policy. He resigned as secretary of foreign affairs on July 2, 2002. He also resigned from Lakas-NUCD on October 3, 2003. In the 2004 Philippine elections, Guingona did not seek a full term. In that election, he supported the presidential and vice-presidential bids of opposition candidates Fernando Poe Jr. and Senator Loren Legarda, respectively. His vice presidential term ended on June 30, 2004, and he was succeeded by Senator Noli de Castro, who was Arroyo's running mate.

== Post vice presidency (2004–present) ==
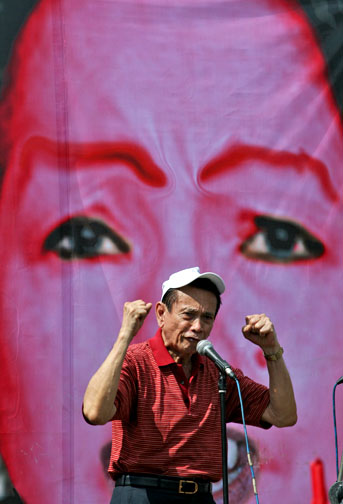
Former Vice President Guingona Jr. in 2007

After the defeat of his candidate, Fernando Poe Jr., Guingona supported the administration of Arroyo again by accepting the position of ambassador to China. He resigned as ambassador and joined the opposition again at the height of the Hello Garci scandal, a political scandal involving Arroyo's alleged rigging of the 2004 presidential elections.

On November 29, 2007, Guingona participated in the Manila Peninsula rebellion, a mutiny led by Senator Antonio Trillanes and Brigadier General Danilo Lim that called for Arroyo's resignation. He was arrested afterward, but on December 13, 2007, the Makati Regional Trial Court dismissed rebellion cases against him.

Guingona wrote his 346-page book Fight for the Filipino, which contains his memoirs. It was launched on July 4, 2008, his 80th birthday, at the Manila Hotel.

== Personal life ==
Guingona is married to Ruth de Lara, a former mayor and vice mayor of Gingoog, Misamis Oriental. His son, Teofisto III (TG), is a former senator of the Philippines, while his daughter, Stella Marie, also served as mayor of Gingoog until 2019.

== Electoral history ==
Electoral history of Teofisto Guingona Jr.
Year	Office	Party	Votes received				Result
Year	Office	Party	Total	%	P.	Swing	Result
1987	Senator of the Philippines	Liberal	9,957,591	43.79%	15th	—N/a	Won
1992	Senator of the Philippines	LDP	5,830,044	24.04%	14th	-19.75	Won
1998	Senator of the Philippines	Lakas–NUCD	7,325,343	25.01%	11th	+0.91	Won

Business positions
Preceded by Teofilo Reyes Jr.	President of the Chamber of Commerce of the Philippine Islands; 1968–1969	Succeeded by Rogelio Manalo
Political offices
New office	Chairman of the Commission on Audit; 1986–1987	Succeeded by Eufemio Domingo
Preceded by Edelmiro Amante	Executive Secretary of the Philippines; 1993–1995	Succeeded by Ruben Torres
Preceded by Demetrio Demetria	Secretary of Justice of the Philippines; 1995–1998	Succeeded by Silvestre Bello III
Preceded by Domingo Siazon Jr.	Secretary of Foreign Affairs of the Philippines; 2001–2002	Succeeded by Gloria Macapagal Arroyo
Vacant Title last held by Gloria Macapagal Arroyo	Vice President of the Philippines; 2001–2004	Succeeded by Noli de Castro
Senate of the Philippines
Recreated Title last held by Jose Roy	President pro tempore of the Senate of the Philippines; 1987–1990	Succeeded by Sotero Laurel
Preceded by Orly Mercado	Senate Majority Leader; 1990–1991	Succeeded by Alberto Romulo
Preceded by Ernesto Maceda	President pro tempore of the Senate of the Philippines; 1993	Succeeded by Leticia Ramos-Shahani
Preceded by Ernesto Maceda	Senate Minority Leader; 1998–2001	Succeeded by Aquilino Pimentel Jr.
Order of precedence
Preceded by Members of the Council of State who are not Cabinet Members	Order of Precedence of the Philippines (Ceremonial) as Former Vice President	Succeeded by Noli de Castro as Former Vice President
