= 2001 Philippine vice presidential confirmation =

- February 7, 2001

24 and 257 members of the Senate and House Majority of both Senate and House votes needed to win
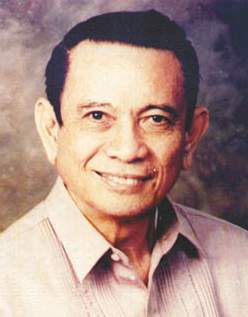
| Nominee | Teofisto Guingona Jr. |
| Party | Lakas |
| Electoral vote | 18 (Senate); 140 (House) |
| Percentage | 94.74% (Senate); 100.00% (House) (Note: The motion to confirm Guingona's nomination was approved without objection. The total of votes reflects the number of representatives who responded to the roll call during the session, based on congressional records.) |
Vice President before election
Gloria Macapagal Arroyo
Confirmed Vice President
Teofisto Guingona Jr.

On January 20, 2001, President Joseph Estrada was overthrown by the peaceful Second EDSA Revolution (EDSA II). Vice president Gloria Macapagal Arroyo was sworn in as the fourteenth president of the Philippines, leaving the office of the vice president vacant. According to Article VII, Section 9 of the 1987 Philippine Constitution, a vacancy in the vice presidency is filled by presidential nomination from among the members of the Senate and the House of Representatives, subject to confirmation by a majority vote of all members of each chamber voting separately.

On February 6, 2001, Arroyo announced in a televised speech her nomination of Senate minority leader Teofisto Guingona Jr. as vice president. Other candidates she considered included Senate president Aquilino Pimentel Jr., and senators Franklin Drilon, Raul Roco, Loren Legarda, and Ramon Magsaysay Jr. Arroyo later stated that her choice would come from Mindanao, narrowing the selection to Guingona and Pimentel, before ultimately selecting Guingona as her nominee. Following the confirmation, Guingona gave up his Senate seat.

== Confirmation votes ==
With 18 votes, the Senate confirmed the nomination of Teofisto Guingona Jr. (Note: Guingona himself voted to abstain.) Senators Miriam Defensor-Santiago, Juan Ponce Enrile, and John Henry Osmeña voted in the affirmative, although with reservations, pending the Supreme Court’s ruling on the legitimacy of Arroyo’s presidency. Senators Tessie Aquino-Oreta and Robert Barbers were noted to be absent during the vote. The House of Representatives unanimously confirmed Guingona's nomination, although Maguindanao's first district representative Didagen Dilangalen expressed dissent (despite not objecting to the motion to confirm made by South Cotabato's 1st district representative Luwalhati Antonino), stating he would block the confirmation as he considered Arroyo an acting president, and that there is no vacancy in the vice presidency.

Despite this, the Senate confirmed Guingona’s nomination through Resolution No. 82, while the House approved it through Resolution No. 178. Guingona took his oath of office on February 9, 2001, as the eleventh vice president of the Philippines.

| 2001 Philippine Senate Vice presidential confirmation vote: | Total votes |
|---|---|
| Yes | 18 (94.74%) |
| Abstention | 1 (5.26%) |
Result: Confirmed
Roll call vote on the nomination (Note: Two Senate seats were vacant at the time of the vote: Marcelo Fernan died on July 11, 1999, 2 years before the end of his senatorial term.; Gloria Macapagal Arroyo was elected vice president in 1998.): Senator / Party / Vote; Tessie Aquino-Oreta / LAMMP / Absent; Robert Barbers / Lakas / Absent; Rodolfo Biazon / LAMMP / Yes; Rene Cayetano / Lakas / Yes; Nikki Coseteng / LAMMP / Yes; Miriam Defensor Santiago / PRP / Yes; Franklin Drilon / LAMMP / Yes; Teofisto Guingona Jr. / Lakas / Abstain; Juan Flavier / Lakas / Yes; Gregorio Honasan / Independent / Yes; Robert Jaworski / LAMMP / Yes; Loren Legarda / Lakas / Yes; Ramon Magsaysay Jr. / LAMMP / Yes; Blas Ople / LAMMP / Yes; John Henry Osmeña / LDP / Absent; Serge Osmeña / Liberal / Yes; Nene Pimentel / PDP–Laban / Yes; Juan Ponce Enrile / Independent / Yes; Ramon Revilla Sr. / Lakas / Yes; Raul Roco / Aksyon / Yes; Tito Sotto / LAMMP / Yes; Francisco Tatad / Gabay Bayan / Yes

| 2001 Philippine House Vice presidential confirmation vote: | Total votes |
|---|---|
| Yes | 140 (100.00%) |
Result: Confirmed

== Aftermath ==
Following his confirmation as vice president, Guingona resigned from the Senate before reaching the midpoint of his six-year Senate term set to expire on June 30, 2004, leaving a vacancy three months ahead of the May 14, 2001 midterm elections. To address this, the Senate passed Resolution No. 84 on February 8, 2001, requesting the Commission on Elections (COMELEC) to conduct a special election simultaneously with the regular midterm elections. A total of 13 senators were elected: the candidates placing 1st to 12th won full six-year terms ending in 2007, while the 13th-placed candidate, Gregorio Honasan, was elected to complete Guingona's unexpired Senate term. The validity of this simultaneous special election was later upheld by the Supreme Court in Tolentino v. COMELEC.

Guingona served as Vice President until June 30, 2004, and did not seek re-election that year. During the election campaign, he broke away from President Arroyo's administration and supported the presidential bid of her rival Fernando Poe Jr., who ultimately lost the election to Arroyo.
