= 1998 Philippine presidential election in Cavite =

- May 11, 1998
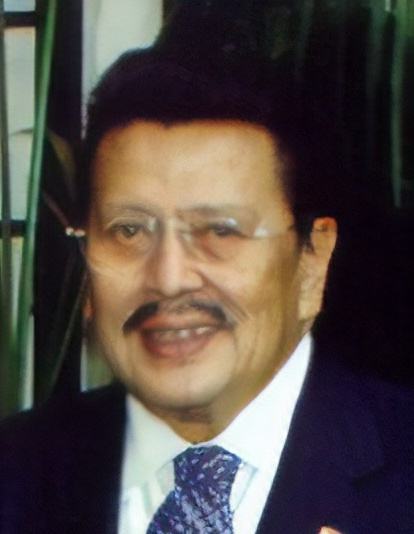

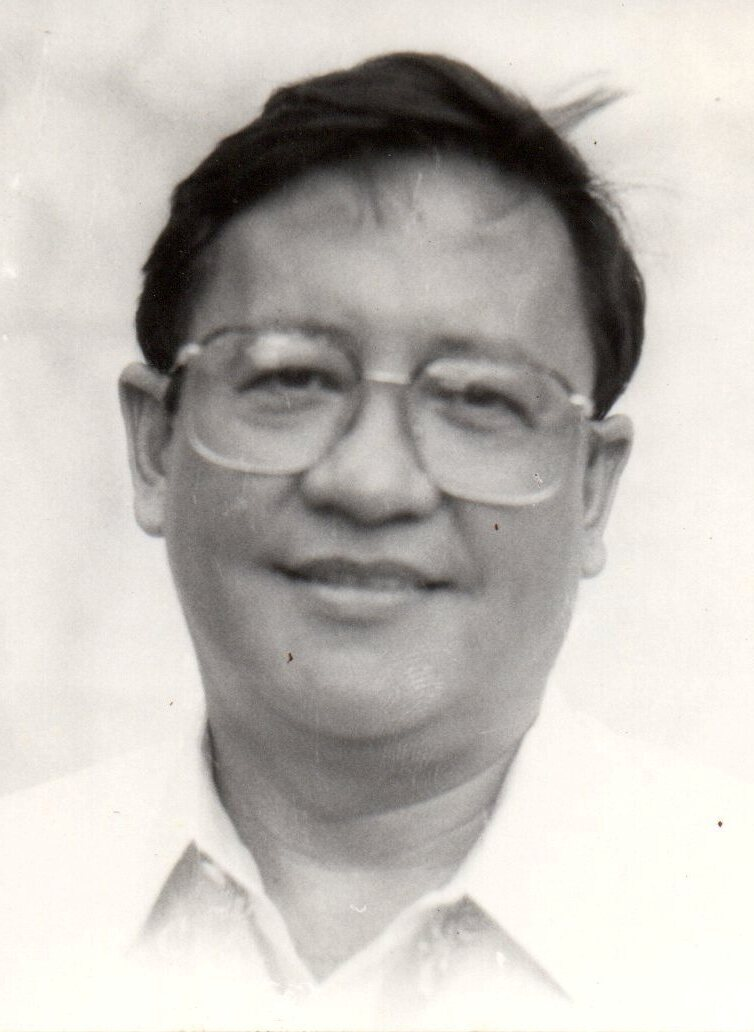

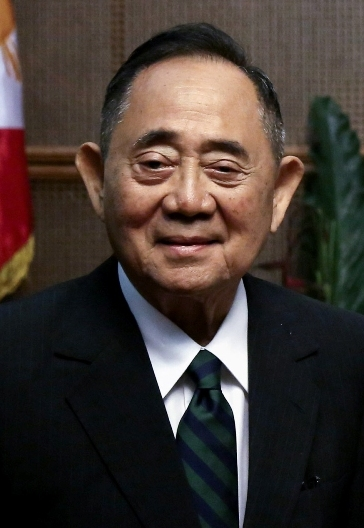

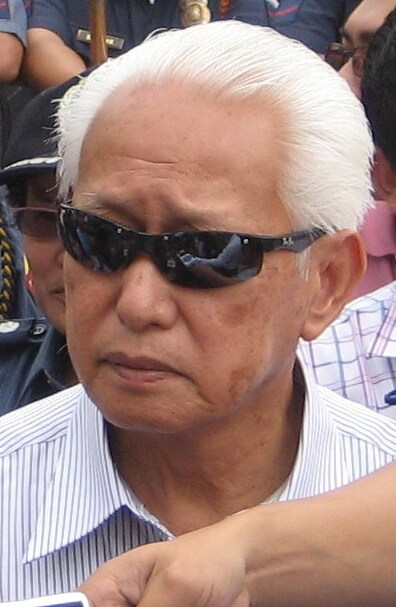
Candidate	Joseph Estrada	Raul Roco
Party	LAMMP	Aksyon
Running mate	Edgardo Angara	Irene Santiago
popular vote	360,239	134,418
Percentage	48.68%	18.16%
Candidate	Jose de Venecia Jr.	Alfredo Lim
Party	Lakas	Liberal
Running mate	Gloria Macapagal Arroyo	Serge Osmeña
popular vote	99,362	85,017
Percentage	13.43%	11.49%
President before election
Fidel V. Ramos
Lakas
Elected President
Joseph Estrada
LAMMP
- 1998 Philippine vice presidential election in Cavite
- May 11, 1998
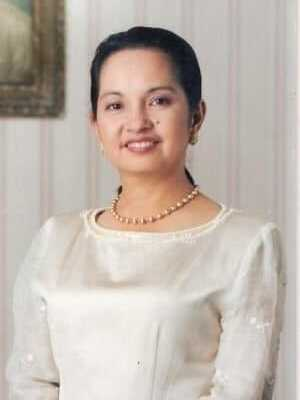

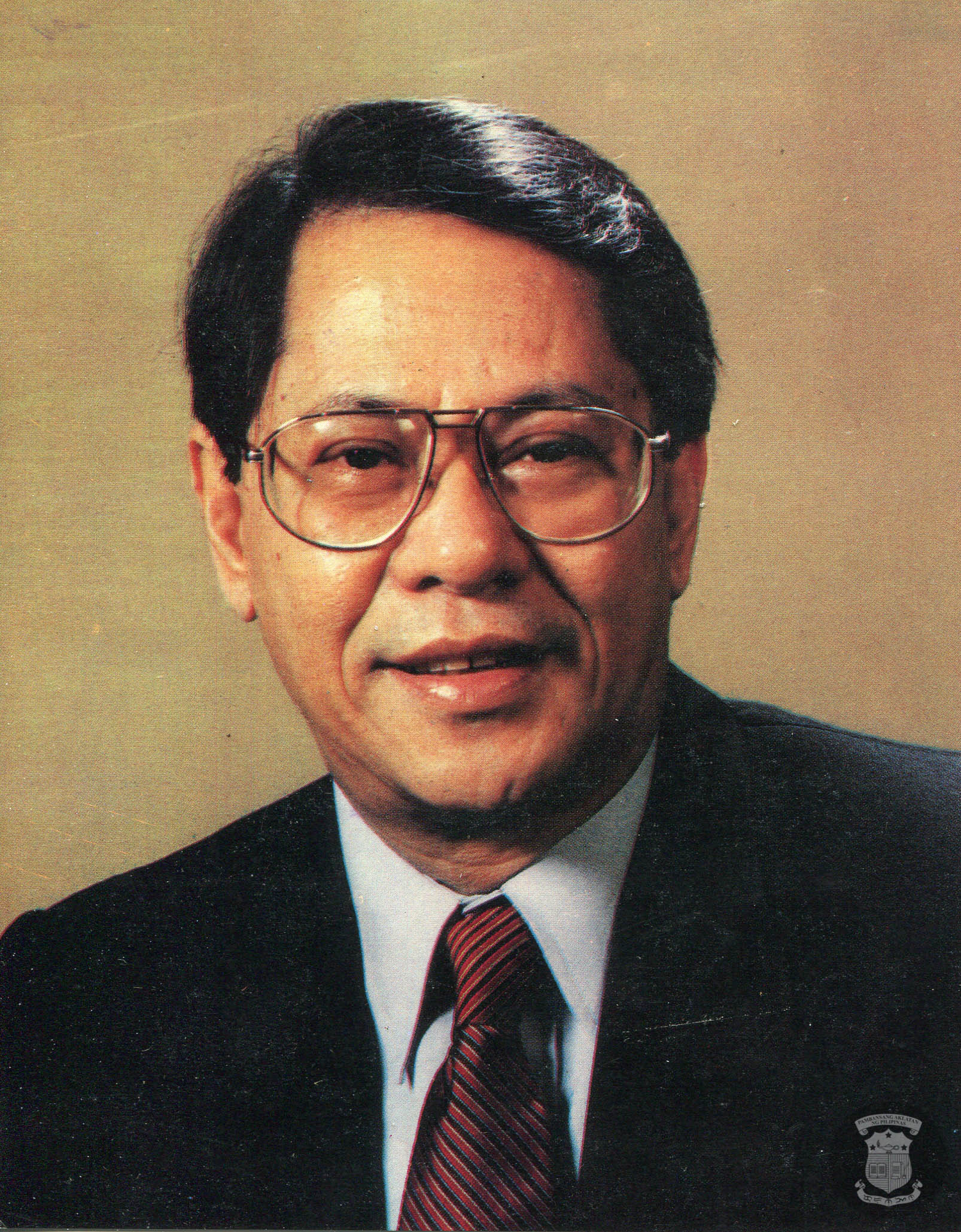

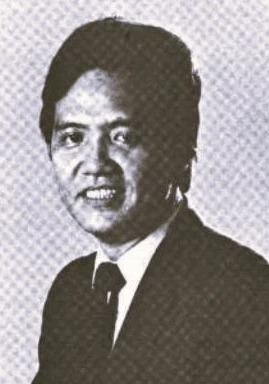
Candidate	Gloria Macapagal Arroyo	Edgardo Angara	Oscar Orbos
Party	Lakas	LAMMP	Reporma
Popular vote	324,963	202,048	119,278
Percentage	44.58%	27.72%	16.36%
Vice President before election
Joseph Estrada
LAMMP
Elected Vice President
Gloria Macapagal Arroyo
Lakas

The 1998 Philippine presidential and vice presidential elections in Cavite were held on Monday, May 11, 1998, as part of the 1998 Philippine general election in which all 78 provinces and 83 cities participated. Voters voted for the president and the vice president separately.

Vice president Joseph Estrada won the province of Cavite in a landslide and defeated Senator Raul Roco, House speaker Jose de Venecia Jr., Manila mayor Alfredo Lim, and others.

Senator Gloria Macapagal Arroyo also won the province in a landslide and defeated fellow Senator Edgardo Angara, Pangasinan governor Oscar Orbos, and others.

== Electoral system ==
According to the Constitution of the Philippines, the elections are held every six years after 1992, on the second Monday of May. The incumbent president is term limited and ineligible for re-election. The incumbent vice president is eligible to run for re-election and may run for two consecutive terms. The plurality voting system is used to determine the winner: the candidate with the highest number of votes, whether or not one has a majority, wins the presidency. The vice presidential election is a separate election, is held on the same rules, and voters may split their ticket. Both winners will serve six-year terms commencing on the noon of June 30, 1998, and ending on the same day six years later.

== Candidates ==
List of Presidential and Vice Presidential candidates
Candidate (For President)	Party	Candidate (For Vice President/Running Mate)	Party
Jose de Venecia Jr.	Lakas	Gloria Macapagal Arroyo	Lakas
Renato de Villa	Reporma	Oscar Orbos	Reporma
Miriam Defensor Santiago	PRP	Francisco Tatad	PRP
Santiago Dumlao	Kilusan para sa Pambansang Pagpapanibago	Reynaldo Pacheco	Kilusan para sa Pambansang Pagpapanibago
Juan Ponce Enrile	Independent	None	
Joseph Estrada	LAMMP	Edgardo Angara	LAMMP
Alfredo Lim	Liberal	Serge Osmeña	Liberal
Imelda Marcos (withdrew)	KBL	None	
Manuel Morato	Partido Bansang Marangal	Camilo Sabio	Partido Bansang Marangal
Lito Osmeña	PROMDI	Ismael Sueno	PROMDI
Raul Roco	Aksyon	Irene Santiago	Aksyon

== Results ==
=== Presidential result ===
1998 Philippine presidential election results in Cavite
Party	Candidate	Votes	%
LAMMP	Joseph Estrada	360,239	48.68%
Aksyon	Raul Roco	134,418	18.16%
Lakas	Jose de Venecia	99,362	13.43%
Liberal	Alfredo Lim	85,017	11.49%
Reporma	Renato de Villa	31,443	4.25%
PROMDI	Lito Osmeña	15,225	2.06%
PRP	Miriam Defensor Santiago	9,859	1.33%
Independent	Juan Ponce Enrile	3,009	0.41%
Partido Bansang Marangal	Manuel Morato	818	0.11%
Kilusan para sa Pambansang Pagpapanibago	Santiago Dumlao	689	0.09
Total votes		740,079	100.00%

=== Vice presidential result ===
1998 Philippine vice presidential election results in Cavite
Party	Candidate	Votes	%
Lakas	Gloria Macapagal Arroyo	324,963	44.58%
LAMMP	Edgardo Angara	202,048	27.72%
Reporma	Oscar Orbos	119,278	16.36%
Liberal	Serge Osmeña	63,554	8.72%
PRP	Francisco Tatad	12,932	1.77%
Aksyon	Irene Santiago	4,802	0.66%
PROMDI	Ismael Sueno	532	0.07%
Kilusan para sa Pambansang Pagpapanibago	Reynaldo Pacheco	434	0.06%
Partido Bansang Marangal	Camilo Sabio	341	0.05
Total votes		728,884	100.00%
