= 2022 Iligan local elections =

Philippine election

Iligan mayoral elections, 2022
- May 9, 2022
- Turnout: 83.44%
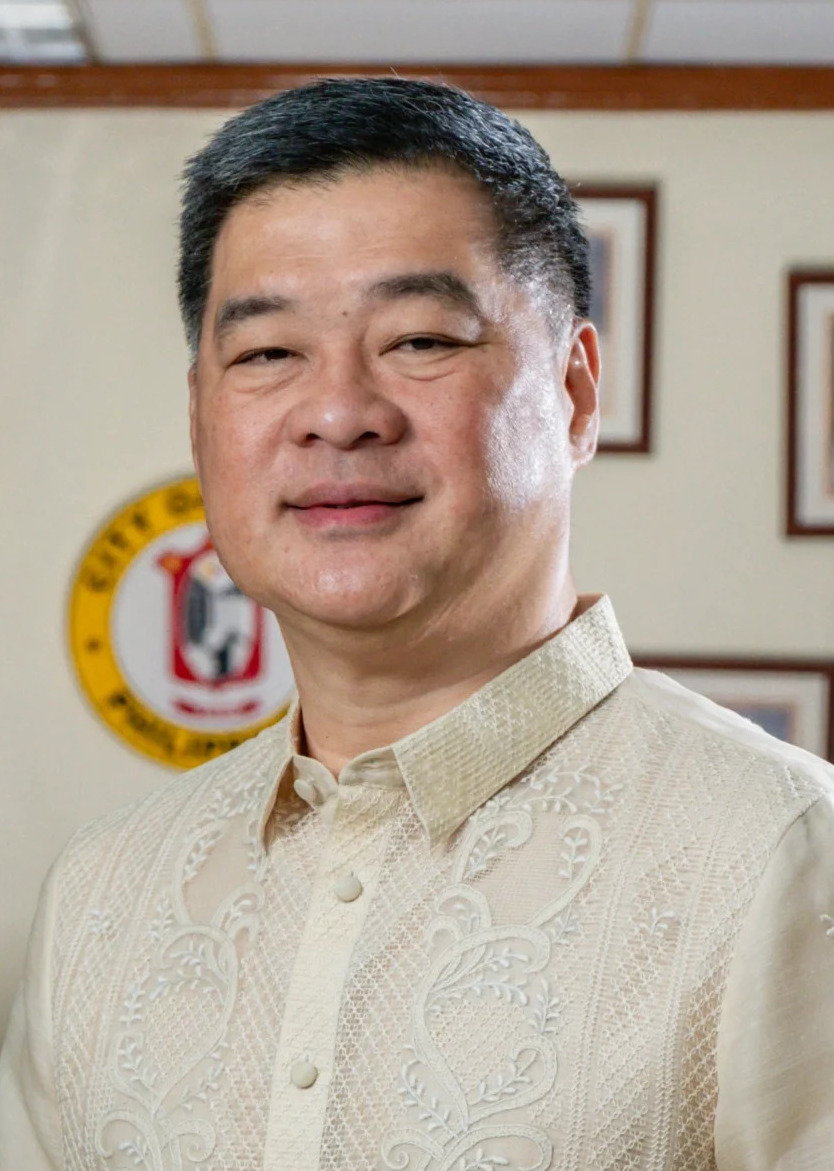
		PDPLBN
Nominee	Frederick Siao	Jemar Vera Cruz
Party	Nacionalista	PDP–Laban
Running mate	Marianito Alemania	Ian Uy
Popular vote	81,205	52,766
Percentage	52.48	34.10
	PROMDI	PDR
Nominee	Rudolph Charles Tamula	Leo Zaragosa
Party	PROMDI	Reporma
Running mate	Ariel Barry Magallanes	Andres Visaya Jr.
Popular vote	6,296	4,888
Percentage	4.07	3.16
Mayor before election
Celso Regencia
PDP–Laban
Elected mayor
Frederick Siao
Nacionalista

Local elections were held in Iligan City on May 9, 2022, as part of the Philippine general election. Registered voters elected officials for the local posts in the city: the mayor, vice mayor, one congressman, and twelve councilors.

By the end of filing of certificates of candidacy last October 8, 2021, a total of 2 hopefuls filed their COCs for congressman, 7 for city mayor, 4 for vice-mayor, and 49 for city councilors.

On May 10, 2022, a new set of mayor, vice-mayor, congressman, councilors were declared winners by the city board of canvassers at the session hall of the Sangguniang Panlungsod. A total of 154,734 cast their votes (from 263 total election returns) out of 185,452 eligible voters in the city for this election, giving a voter turnout of 83.44%, an increase of 10.89% from last 2019 election's turnout of 72.55%.

== Mayoral election ==
Celso Regencia (PDP–Laban) is the incumbent but term-limited. He ran for congressman of the city. Incumbent vice-mayor Jemar Vera Cruz was the ruling party's official nominee against incumbent congressman Frederick Siao. Siao announced his candidacy under Nacionalista Party allied with Hugpong ng Pagbabago (HNP) banner. Siao became the newly elected city mayor and won via landslide.

Iligan City Mayoral Election
Party	Candidate	Votes	%
Nacionalista	Frederick Siao	81,205	52.48%
PDP–Laban	Jemar Vera Cruz	52,766	34.10%
PROMDI	Rudolph Charles Tamula	6,296	4.07%
Reporma	Leo Zaragosa	4,888	3.16%
Independent	Alberto Ong Jr.	820	0.53%
Independent	Angel Cistona Cruz	624	0.40%
Independent	Manuel Battung Jr.	219	0.14%
Valid ballots		146,818	94.88%
Invalid or blank votes		7,916	5.12%
Total votes		154,734	100.00%

== Vice mayoral election ==
Jemar Vera Cruz (PDP–Laban) was the incumbent and on his second term. The ruling party nominated him for city mayor instead while nominating incumbent councilor Ian Uy for vice-mayor against businessman and former mayoral aspirant Marianito Alemania (Nacionalista Party). Alemania won with a slim margin over Uy.

Iligan City Vice Mayoral Election
Party	Candidate	Votes	%
Nacionalista	Marianito Alemania	69,424	44.87%
PDP–Laban	Ian Chua Uy	61,239	39.58%
PROMDI	Ariel Barry Magallanes	7,973	5.15%
Reporma	Andres Visaya Jr.	2,534	1.64%
Valid ballots		141,170	91.23%
Invalid or blank votes		13,564	8.77%
Total votes		154,734	100.00%

== Congressional election ==
Frederick Siao was the incumbent and only on his second term. However, he chose to run for City Mayor, nominating former congressman Vicente "Varf" Belmonte Jr. (NUP) to run instead against incumbent mayor Celso Regencia (PDP–Laban).

2022 Philippine House of Representatives election in Iligan City
Party	Candidate	Votes	%
PDP–Laban	Celso Regencia	75,426	48.75%
NUP	Vicente Belmonte Jr.	70,272	45.41%
Valid ballots		145,698	94.16%
Invalid or blank votes		9,036	5.84%
Total votes		154,734	100.00%

== City council election ==
Party or alliance		Votes	%	Seats
Team Siao	Nacionalista Party	623,432	40.43	7
Team Siao	United Nationalist Alliance	73,595	4.77	1
Team Siao	National Unity Party	70,672	4.58	1
Team Siao	Total	767,699	49.78	9
Partido Demokratiko Pilipino-Lakas ng Bayan-Team RVU		588,698	38.17	3
Progressive Movement for the Devolution of Initiatives-Tatak Iliganon		66,358	4.30	–
Partido para sa Demokratikong Reporma-Alyansa Sa Bag-Ong Iligan		33,438	2.17	–
Independent		85,986	5.58	–
Ex officio seats				2
Total		1,542,179	100.00	23

Parties are as stated in their certificates of candidacy.

Iligan City Council Elections
Party	Candidate	Votes	%
Nacionalista	Bernard Pacaña	78,202	50.54%
UNA	Simplicio Larrazabal III	73,595	47.56%
NUP	Rosevi Queenie Belmonte	70,672	45.67%
Nacionalista	Michelle Echavez Sweet-Booc	70,367	45.48%
Nacionalista	Samuel Huertas	69,388	44.84%
Nacionalista	Providencio Abragan Jr.	65,690	44.84%
PDP–Laban	Jessie Ray Balanay	65,147	42.10%
PDP–Laban	Rhandy Ryan Francis Ong	64,932	41.96%
Nacionalista	Marlene Young	62,811	40.59%
Nacionalista	Ramil Emborong	59,932	38.73%
Nacionalista	Maria Paz Teresa Zalsos Uychiat	58,551	37.84%
PDP–Laban	Nhicolle Capangpangan	57,407	37.10%
Nacionalista	Eric Capitan	55,917	36.14%
PDP–Laban	Sorilie Christine Bacsarpa	55,225	35.69%
PDP–Laban	Demosthenes Plando	53,171	34.36%
Nacionalista	Rene Orbe	52,744	34.09%
Nacionalista	Mariza Go Minaga	49,830	32.20%
PDP–Laban	Petronilo Pardillo	47,137	30.46%
PDP–Laban	Ralph Vincent Gerona	47,057	30.41%
PDP–Laban	Renato Ancis	43,774	28.29%
PDP–Laban	Eleno Bacus Jr.	41,831	27.03%
PDP–Laban	Richard Veloso	38,166	24.67%
PDP–Laban	Bob Silver Tabimina	37,479	24.22%
PDP–Laban	Edgardo Prospero	37,372	24.15%
Independent	Philamer Sabarre	23,453	15.16%
Independent	Reggie Punongbayan	18,802	12.15%
Independent	Ricardo Abellanosa Jr.	18,186	11.75%
PROMDI	Teodoro Gayo Jr.	11,973	7.74%
PROMDI	Clint Galan	10,005	6.47%
Reporma	Joel Jumawan	9,888	6.39%
PROMDI	Jose Sean Actub	8,896	5.75%
PROMDI	Albert Cabili	8,093	5.23%
PROMDI	James Aberilla Jr.	6,667	4.31%
PROMDI	Edward Chan Blaza	6,627	4.28%
Reporma	Rolando Bado	6,621	4.28%
Independent	Dominic Carillo	6,050	3.91%
PROMDI	Rey Manzanero	5,687	3.68%
Reporma	Dean Noel Benegrado	5,493	3.55%
Reporma	Walter Lubguban	4,776	3.09%
Reporma	Rogelio Sumingit	4,759	3.08%
PROMDI	Eduardo Loyola	4,337	2.80%
Independent	Santiago Taping	4,178	2.70%
PROMDI	Sherwel Mancio	4,073	2.63%
Independent	Aldrich Daguman Sabac	4,047	2.62%
Independent	Alvin Galorio	3,934	2.54%
Independent	Marion Suerte	2,834	1.83%
Independent	Michael Actub Coleto	2,515	1.63%
Independent	Danilo Galleto	1,987	1.28%
Reporma	Reynaldo Bonto Jr.	1,901	1.23%
Valid ballots		128,515	83.06%
Invalid or blank votes		26,219	16.94%
Total votes		154,734	100.00%

Party or alliance		Votes	%	Seats
Team Siao	Nacionalista Party	623,432	40.43	7
Team Siao	United Nationalist Alliance	73,595	4.77	1
Team Siao	National Unity Party	70,672	4.58	1
Team Siao	Total	767,699	49.78	9
Partido Demokratiko Pilipino-Lakas ng Bayan		588,698	38.17	3
PROMDI		66,358	4.30	0
Partido para sa Demokratikong Reporma		33,438	2.17	0
Independent		85,986	5.58	0
Ex-officio seats				2
Total		1,542,179	100.00	14

== Candidates per Coalition ==
=== Partido Demokratiko Pilipino-Lakas ng Bayan (Team RVU 15-0) ===
#	Name	Party
For House of Representatives
2.	Celso Regencia	PDP–Laban
For Mayor
6.	Jemar Vera Cruz	PDP–Laban
For Vice Mayor
3.	Ian Chua Uy	PDP–Laban
For Councilor
5.	Renato Ancis	PDP–Laban
6.	Sorilie Christine Bacsarpa	PDP–Laban
7.	Eleno Bacus Jr.	PDP–Laban
9.	Jake Balanay	PDP–Laban
15.	Nichole Capangpangan	PDP–Laban
24.	Ralph Vincent Gerona	PDP–Laban
33.	Ryan Ong	PDP–Laban
36.	Noli Pardillo	PDP–Laban
37.	Demosthenes Plando	PDP–Laban
38.	Edgardo Prospero	PDP–Laban
45.	Bobby Tabimina	PDP–Laban
47.	Richard Veloso	PDP–Laban

=== Nacionalista Party (Team BSA Solid 15) ===
#	Name	Party
For House of Representatives
1.	Vicente Belmonte Jr.	NUP
For Mayor
4.	Frederick Siao	Nacionalista
For Vice Mayor
1.	Marianito Alemania	Nacionalista
For Councilor
3.	Providencio Abragan Jr.	Nacionalista
10.	Rosevi Queenie Belmonte	NUP
16.	Eric Capitan	Nacionalista
19.	Ramil Emborong	Nacionalista
25.	Samuel Huertas	Nacionalista
27.	Simplicio Larrazabal III	UNA
32.	Mariza Go Minaga	Nacionalista
34.	Rene Orbe	Nacionalista
35.	Bernard Pacaña	Nacionalista
44.	Michelle Sweet-Booc	Nacionalista
48.	Marlene Young	Nacionalista
49.	Maria Paz Betsy Zalsos	Nacionalista

=== PROMDI (Tatak Iliganon) ===
#	Name	Party
For Mayor
5.	Rudolph Charles Tamula	PROMDI
For Vice Mayor
2.	Ariel Barry Magallanes	PROMDI
For Councilor
2.	James Aberilla Jr.	PROMDI
4.	Jose Sean Actub	PROMDI
12.	Edward Chan Blaza	PROMDI
14.	Albert Cabili	PROMDI
20.	Clint Galan	PROMDI
23.	Teodoro Gayo Jr.	PROMDI
28.	Eduardo Loyola	PROMDI
30.	Sherwel Mancio	PROMDI
31.	Rey Manzanero	PROMDI

=== Partido para sa Demokratikong Reporma (Alyansa Sa Bag-Ong Iligan) ===
#	Name	Party
For Mayor
7.	Leo Zaragosa	Reporma
For Vice Mayor
4.	Andres Visaya Jr.	Reporma
For Councilor
8.	Rolando Bado	Reporma
11.	Dean Noel Benegrado	Reporma
13.	Reynaldo Bonto Jr.	Reporma
26.	Joel Jumawan	Reporma
29.	Walter Lubguban	Reporma
43.	Rogelio Sumingit	Reporma

=== Independents ===
#	Name	Party
For Mayor
1.	Manuel Battung Jr.	Independent
2.	Angel Cistona Cruz	Independent
3.	Alberto Ong Jr.	Independent
For Councilors
1.	Ricardo Abellanosa Jr.	Independent
17.	Dominic Carillo	Independent
18.	Michael Coleto	Independent
21.	Danilo Galleto	Independent
22.	Alvin Galorio	Independent
39.	Reggie Punongbayan	Independent
40.	Aldrin Sabac	Independent
41.	Philamer Sabarre	Independent
42.	Marion Suerte	Independent
46.	Sonny Taping	Independent
