= List of senators of the Philippines in the 18th Congress by seniority =

This is a complete list of senators of the Philippines during the 18th Congress of the Philippines listed by seniority from June 30, 2019, to June 30, 2022.

The criteria for seniority used in this article are derived from the cumulative length of service of a member of the Senate prior to the current Congress. Although an official roster ranking senators by seniority is not publicly available, their total cumulative years of service have been used to determine seniority. It has long been customary, following the practice of the United States Senate, to elect the most senior senator as either president of the Senate or president pro tempore, although this practice has become less common in the modern Senate. Furthermore, seniority is traditionally considered in the selection of chairpersons of major Senate committees.

In cases where senators have equal cumulative service, seniority is determined by the following criteria, in order:

- Longest uninterrupted period of service
- Earlier date on which the cumulative length of service was achieved
- Alphabetical order of surnames

In this Congress, Tito Sotto was the most senior senator, having previously served 21 years in Senate, while Francis Tolentino was the most junior senator.

== List of senators by seniority ==
Rank	Senator	Party	Length of previous tenures (Dates of previous tenures)	Notes
1	Tito Sotto	NPC	21 years, 0 days (June 30, 1992 – June 30, 2004; June 30, 2010 – June 30, 2019)	Senate president
2	Franklin Drilon	Liberal	21 years, 0 days (June 30, 1995 – June 30, 2007; June 30, 2010 – June 30, 2019)	
3	Panfilo Lacson	Independent (Note: Panfilo Lacson was affiliated with Partido para sa Demokratikong Reporma from 2021 until 2022.)	15 years, 0 days (June 30, 2001 – June 30, 2013; June 30, 2016 – June 30, 2019)	
4	Kiko Pangilinan	Liberal	15 years, 0 days (June 30, 2001 – June 30, 2013; June 30, 2016 – June 30, 2019)	
5	Ralph Recto	Nacionalista	15 years, 0 days (June 30, 2001 – June 30, 2007; June 30, 2010 – June 30, 2019)	Senate president pro tempore
6	Pia Cayetano	Nacionalista	12 years, 0 days (June 30, 2004 – June 30, 2016)	
7	Lito Lapid	NPC	12 years, 0 days (June 30, 2004 – June 30, 2016)	
8	Bong Revilla	Lakas	12 years, 0 days (June 30, 2004 – June 30, 2016)	
9	Dick Gordon	Bagumbayan–VNP	9 years, 0 days (June 30, 2004 – June 30, 2010; June 30, 2016 – June 30, 2019)	
10	Koko Pimentel	PDP–Laban	7 years, 323 days (August 11, 2011 – June 30, 2019)	
11	Juan Miguel Zubiri	Independent	7 years, 34 days (June 30, 2007 – August 3, 2011; June 30, 2016 – June 30, 2019)	
12	Sonny Angara	LDP	6 years, 0 days (June 30, 2013 – June 30, 2019)	
13	Nancy Binay	UNA	6 years, 0 days (June 30, 2013 – June 30, 2019)	
14	Grace Poe	Independent	6 years, 0 days (June 30, 2013 – June 30, 2019)	
15	Cynthia Villar	Nacionalista	6 years, 0 days (June 30, 2013 – June 30, 2019)	
16	Leila de Lima	Liberal	3 years, 0 days (June 30, 2016 – June 30, 2019)	
17	Sherwin Gatchalian	NPC	3 years, 0 days (June 30, 2016 – June 30, 2019)	
18	Risa Hontiveros	Akbayan	3 years, 0 days (June 30, 2016 – June 30, 2019)	
19	Manny Pacquiao	PROMDI (Note: Manny Pacquiao became the honorary chairperson of PROMDI in 2021, while keeping his affiliation with PDP–Laban.)	3 years, 0 days (June 30, 2016 – June 30, 2019)	
20	Joel Villanueva	Independent	3 years, 0 days (June 30, 2016 – June 30, 2019)	
21	Ronald dela Rosa	PDP–Laban		
22	Bong Go	PDP–Laban (Note: Bong Go was affiliated with Pederalismo ng Dugong Dakilang Samahan in 2021.)		
23	Imee Marcos	Nacionalista		
24	Francis Tolentino	PDP–Laban		
