= 1998 Philippine presidential election =

13th election of the Philippine president

- May 11, 1998
- Turnout: 86.5% (▲11.0pp)
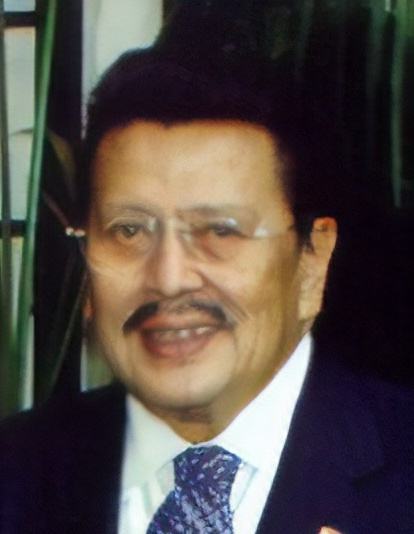

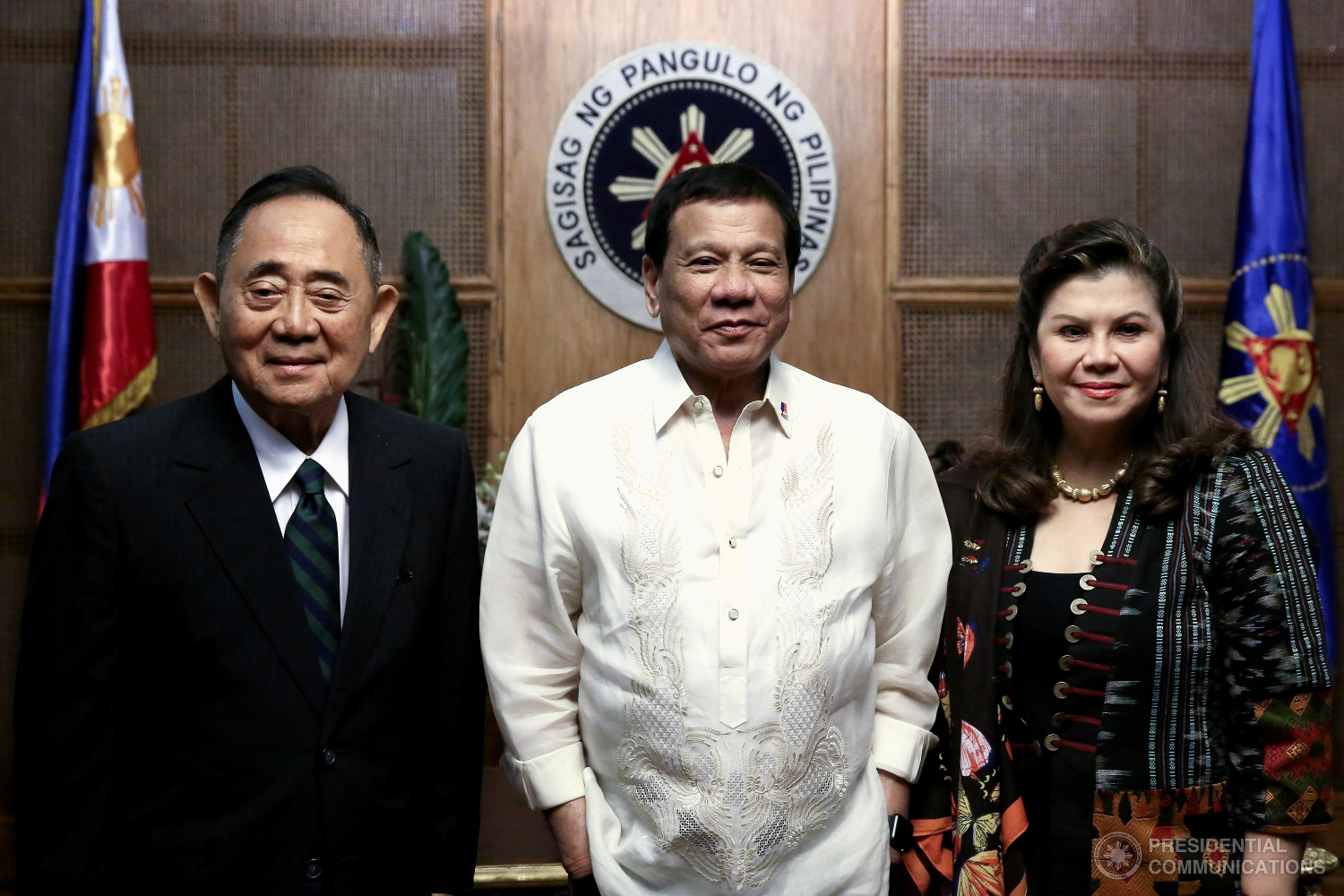

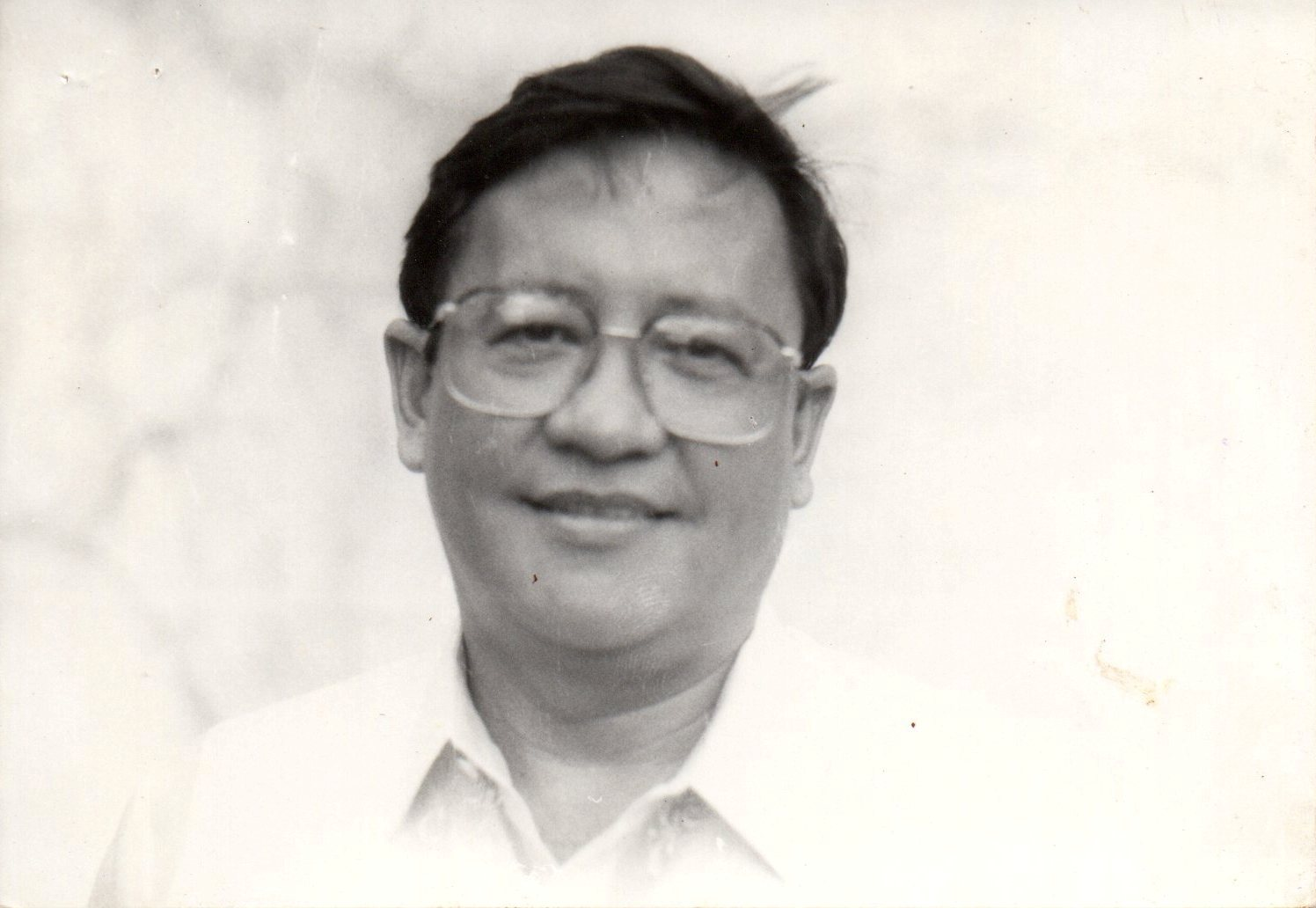
Candidate	Joseph Estrada	Jose de Venecia Jr.
Party	LAMMP	Lakas
Running mate	Edgardo Angara	Gloria Macapagal Arroyo
Popular vote	10,722,295	4,268,483
Percentage	39.86%	15.87%
Candidate	Raul Roco	Lito Osmeña
Party	Aksyon	PROMDI
Running mate	Irene Santiago	Ismael Sueno
Popular vote	3,720,212	3,347,631
Percentage	13.38%	12.44%
- Presidential election results per province.
President before election
Fidel V. Ramos
Lakas
Elected President
Joseph Estrada
LAMMP
- 1998 Philippine vice presidential election
- May 11, 1998
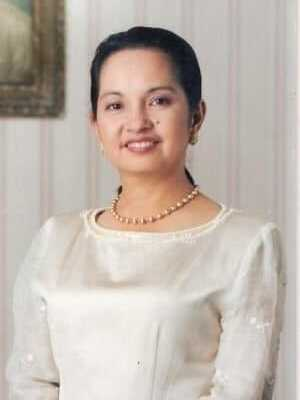

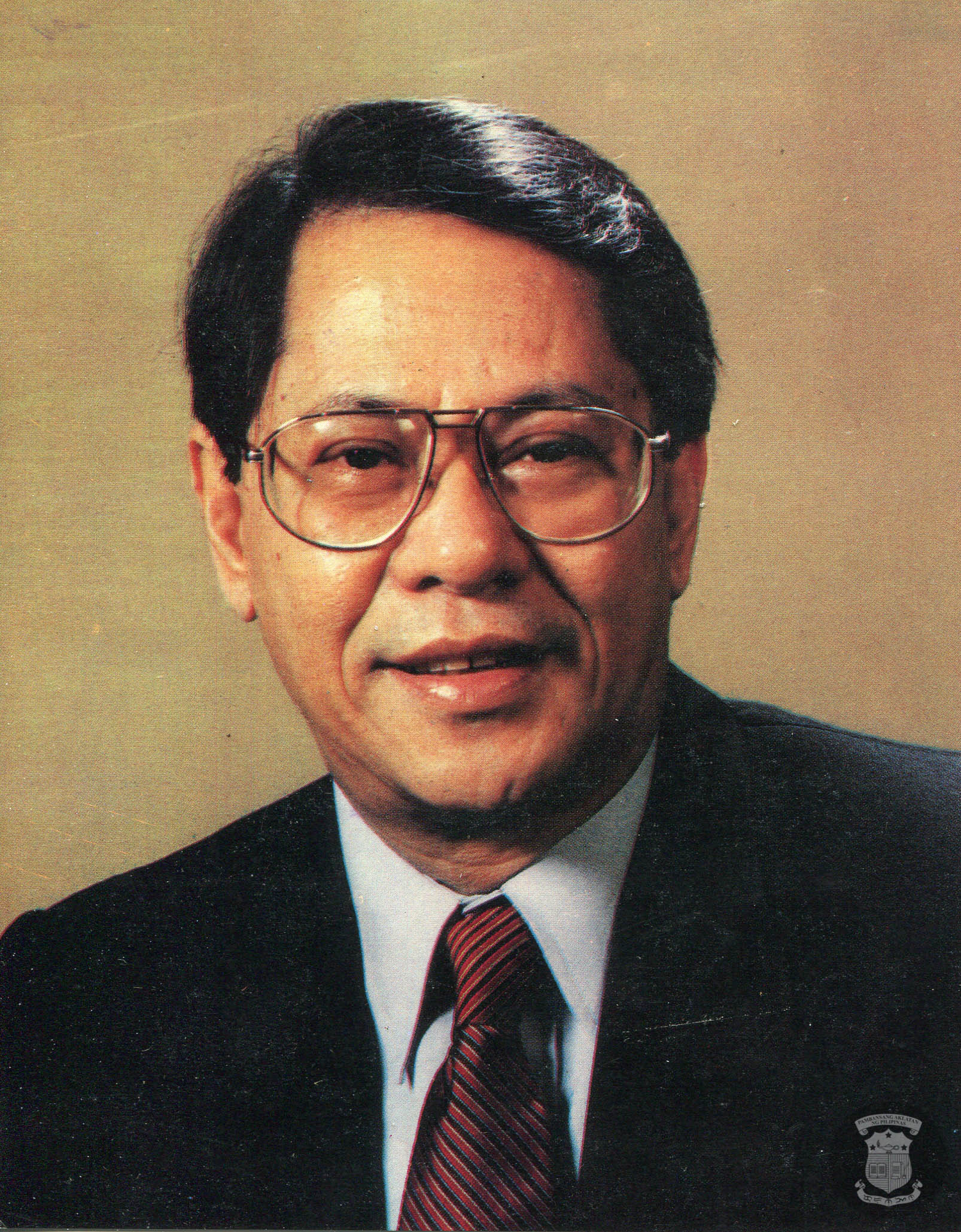

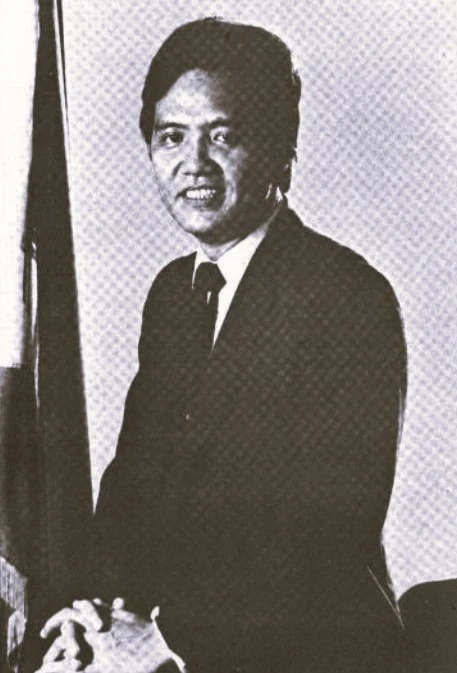

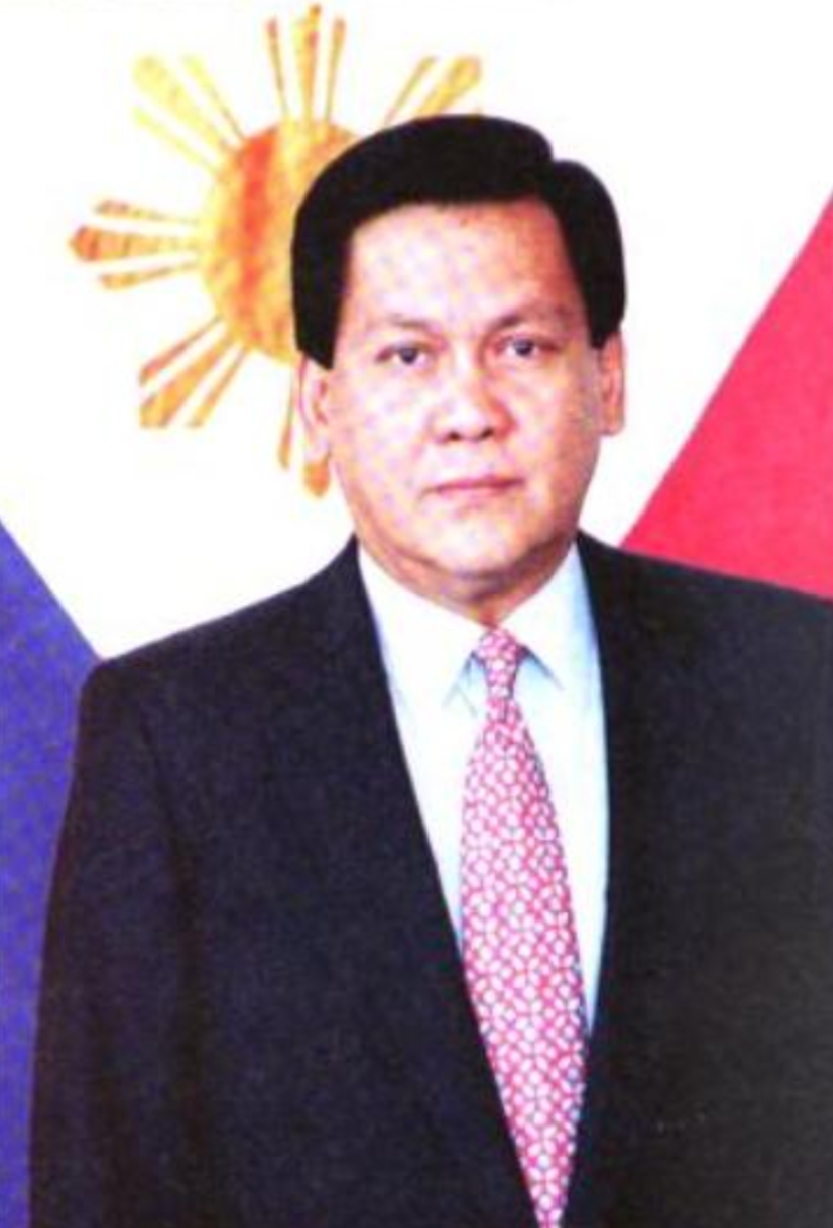
Candidate	Gloria Macapagal Arroyo	Edgardo Angara
Party	Lakas	LAMMP
Popular vote	12,667,252	5,652,068
Percentage	49.56%	22.11%
Candidate	Oscar Orbos	Serge Osmeña
Party	Reporma	Liberal
Popular vote	3,321,779	2,351,462
Percentage	13.00%	9.20%
- Map showing the official results taken from provincial and city certificates of canvass. The inset shows Metro Manila.
Vice President before election
Joseph Estrada
LAMMP
Elected Vice President
Gloria Macapagal Arroyo
Lakas

Presidential and vice presidential elections were held in the Philippines on May 11, 1998. In the presidential election, Vice President Joseph Estrada won a six-year term as President by a landslide victory. In the vice-presidential race, Senator Gloria Macapagal Arroyo won a six-year term as Vice President, also by a landslide victory. This was the third election where both the president and vice president came from different parties.

== Background ==
At the tail-end of the presidency of Fidel V. Ramos, several politicians began jockeying for the nomination of his Lakas–NUCD–UMDP party. This included House Speaker Jose de Venecia Jr., National Defense Secretary Renato de Villa, and Cebu Governor Lito Osmeña.

The Lakas nominee was widely expected to face Vice President Joseph Estrada, who had been the leading candidate in various opinion polls. Estrada had earlier declared in 1992 that he would not run for president, stating his intention to retire upon reaching the age of 60 in 1998, but he later recanted this decision.

Senator Miriam Defensor Santiago, who believed she had been cheated out of the presidency by Ramos in 1992, was also expected to run again.

Former First Lady Imelda Marcos was likewise seen as a potential presidential contender. She banked on the support of loyalists of her husband, deposed president Ferdinand Marcos.

Senator Leticia Ramos-Shahani initially launched her presidential campaign on July 6, 1997, in Pasig City with Lito Osmeña as her running mate. However, she eventually decided to withdraw from the race and instead run for governor of Pangasinan.

Senator Gloria Macapagal Arroyo, who had topped the 1995 Senate election, was also considered a strong presidential contender, founding Kabalikat ng Malayang Pilipino with Tito Sotto, who himself topped the 1992 Senate election, widely seen as her likely running mate.

Senator Raul Roco, who had built a noteworthy Senate career by this point, gained strong backing from the youth through his own party, Aksyon Demokratiko.

The Lakas convention ultimately nominated de Venecia, Ramos' handpicked successor, for president. This led de Villa and Osmeña to bolt from Lakas and set up their own parties. De Venecia picked Arroyo as his vice presidential running mate.

The Liberal Party nominated Manila Mayor Alfredo Lim for president. Meanwhile, the Laban ng Demokratikong Pilipino, Nationalist People's Coalition and Estrada's own Partido ng Masang Pilipino (the forerunner of the Pwersa ng Masang Pilipino) established an electoral alliance known as Laban ng Makabayang Masang Pilipino. Estrada chose Senator Edgardo Angara of LDP as his running mate.

Weeks before election day, Marcos withdrew from the race. Estrada had widened his lead over the other candidates by this point.

== Candidates ==
Presidential candidate	Position	Party	Vice presidential candidate	Position	Party
Jose de Venecia Jr.	Speaker of the House of Representatives	Lakas–NUCD–UMDP	Gloria Macapagal Arroyo	Senator	Lakas–NUCD–UMDP
Renato de Villa	Former Secretary of National Defense (1991–1997)	Partido para sa Demokratikong Reporma	Oscar Orbos	Governor of Pangasinan	Partido para sa Demokratikong Reporma
Miriam Defensor Santiago	Senator	People's Reform Party	Francisco Tatad	Senator	People's Reform Party
Santiago Dumlao	None	Kilusan para sa Pambansang Pagpapanibago	Reynaldo Pacheco	None	Kilusan para sa Pambansang Pagpapanibago
Joseph Estrada	Vice President	Laban ng Makabayang Masang Pilipino	Edgardo Angara	Senator	Laban ng Makabayang Masang Pilipino
Alfredo Lim	Mayor of Manila	Liberal Party	Serge Osmeña	Senator	Liberal Party
Manuel Morato	Chairperson of the Philippine Charity Sweepstakes Office	Partido Bansang Marangal	Camilo Sabio	Secretary-General of the House of Representatives	Partido Bansang Marangal
Lito Osmeña	Former Chief Presidential Economic Adviser (1993–1997)	Probinsya Muna Development Initiative	Ismael Sueno	Former Assembly Member of the Southern Philippine Council for Peace and Development (1997–1998)	Probinsya Muna Development Initiative
Juan Ponce Enrile	Senator	Independent	None		
Raul Roco	Senator	Aksyon Demokratiko	Irene Santiago	None	Aksyon Demokratiko

=== Lakas nomination ===
There were four candidates who sought the nomination of Lakas–NUCD: Jose de Venecia, Renato de Villa, Lito Osmeña, and Bulacan Governor Roberto Pagdanganan. De Villa was confident he would be selected by the party, as he, like President Ramos, was a former constabulary general. However, during the official Lakas party meeting, the presidential nomination was awarded to de Venecia. Following this, de Villa bolted from the party and formed Partido para sa Demokratikong Reporma, while Osmeña established Probinsya Muna Development Initiative.

== Opinion polling ==
Opinion polling, commonly known as "surveys" in the Philippines were administered primarily by Social Weather Stations in 1998.

The tables below graph the last three surveys conducted.

=== For president ===
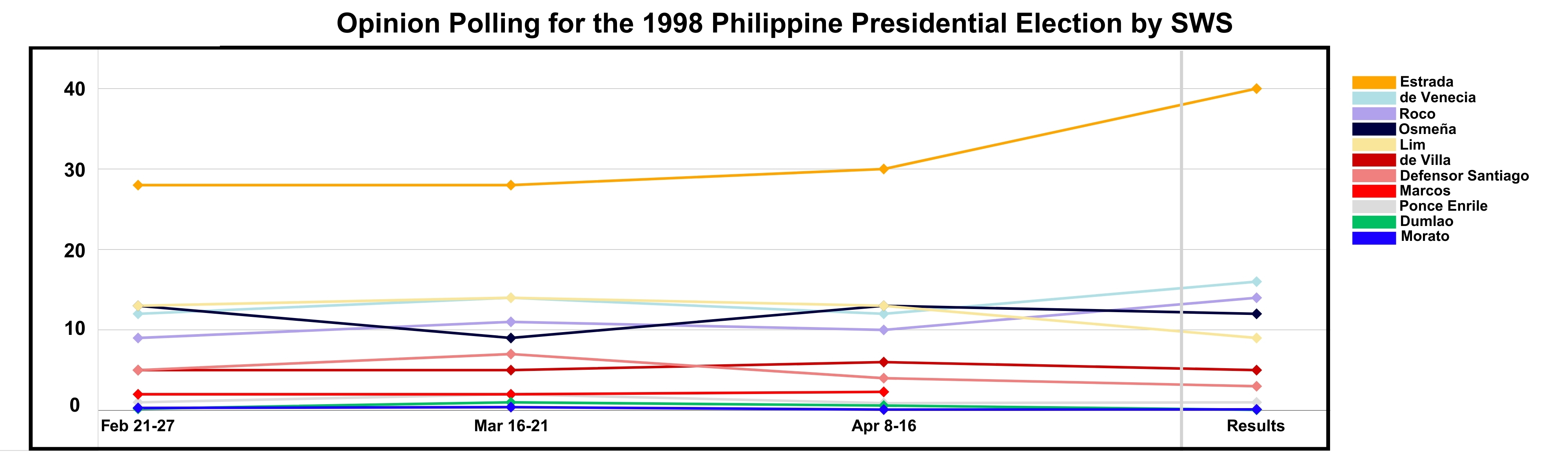

Pollster	Fieldwork date	Sample size	Margin of error	de Venecia	de Villa	Defensor Santiago	Dumlao	Estrada	Lim	Marcos	Morato	Osmeña	Ponce Enrile	Roco	Undecided
SWS	Apr 8–16	1,500	±3%	12	5	4	0.3	30	13	2	0.2	13	2	10	9
SWS	Mar 16–21	1,500	±3%	14	5	7	0.4	28	14	2	1	9	2	11	7
SWS	Feb 21–27	1,500	±3%	12	6	5	0.1	28	14	2.3	0.6	13	0.9	9	10

=== For vice president ===
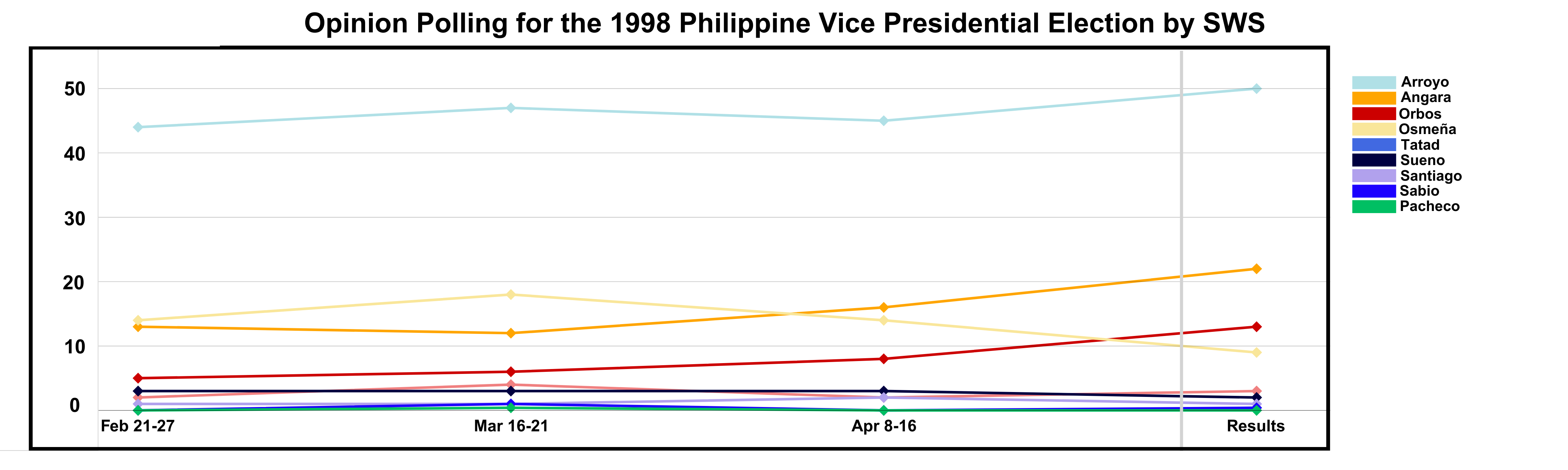

Pollster	Fieldwork date	Sample size	Margin of error	Angara	Macapagal Arroyo	Orbos	Osmeña	Pacheco	Sabio	Santiago	Sueño	Tatad	Undecided
SWS	Apr 8–16	1,500	±3%	16	45	8	14	0.1	0.3	0.9	3	2	9
SWS	Mar 16–21	1,500	±3%	12	47	6	18	0.2	0.5	1	2	4	7
SWS	Feb 21–27	1,500	±3%	13	44	5	14	0.1	0.2	2	2	2	10

== Results ==
The 10th Congress canvassed the votes in joint session for a number of days before declaring Estrada and Arroyo as the winners; with Senate President Neptali Gonzales and Speaker De Venecia announcing the victors.

While the official canvassing did not start a fortnight after Election Day, the National Movement for Free Elections (NAMFREL) held a parallel and unofficial quick count which was released days after the election and was updated at irregular intervals. NAMFREL based their tally from the seventh copy of the election returns given to them.

In theory, the totals for the official canvassing (derived from the certificates of canvass, which are then derived from the election returns) and the completed NAMFREL quick count should be equal.

=== For president ===
Estrada carried the majority of the provinces, his hometown of San Juan City, and Metro Manila.

De Venecia carried his home province of Pangasinan as well as Baguio, Roco carried his home province of Camarines Sur and the rest of the Bicol Region (excluding Masbate), and Osmeña got his foothold over his home province of Cebu and other provinces in the South. Whilst De Villa Only Won His home Province Of Batangas and Siquijor.

Other candidates also carried their home provinces such as Enrile of Cagayan, and Defensor Santiago of Iloilo Province, as well as the neighboring province of Guimaras. Lim was the only major candidate who did not carry any provinces (with the exception of Batanes) and failed to capture his hometown of Manila.

Candidate	Party	Votes	%
Joseph Estrada	Laban ng Makabayang Masang Pilipino	10,722,295	39.86
Jose de Venecia Jr.	Lakas–NUCD–UMDP	4,268,483	15.87
Raul Roco	Aksyon Demokratiko	3,720,212	13.83
Lito Osmeña	PROMDI	3,347,631	12.44
Alfredo Lim	Liberal Party	2,344,362	8.71
Renato de Villa	Partido para sa Demokratikong Reporma–Lapiang Manggagawa	1,308,352	4.86
Miriam Defensor Santiago	People's Reform Party	797,206	2.96
Juan Ponce Enrile	Independent	343,139	1.28
Santiago Dumlao	Kilusan para sa Pambansang Pagpapanibago	32,212	0.12
Manuel Morato	Partido Bansang Marangal	18,644	0.07
Total		26,902,536	100.00
Valid votes		26,902,536	91.86
Invalid/blank votes (Note: Includes 232,714 votes for Imelda Marcos (Kilusang Bagong Lipunan) who withdrew after the ballots were printed.)		2,383,239	8.14
Total votes		29,285,775	100.00
Registered voters/turnout		33,873,665	86.46
Source: Nohlen, Grotz, Hartmann, Hasall and Santos

Popular vote
Estrada	39.86%
De Venecia	15.87%
Roco	13.83%
Osmeña	12.44%
Lim	8.71%
De Villa	4.86%
Others	4.43%

==== NAMFREL quick count ====
Take note that Manuel Morato had a higher number of votes in the NAMFREL quick count than in the official congressional canvass.

NAMFREL quick count result (79.25% of precincts)
Candidate	Party	Results		
Candidate	Party	Votes	%	Diff*
Joseph Estrada	LAMMP	8,239,823	39.47%	−0.39%
Jose de Venecia	Lakas	3,247,067	15.55%	−0.32%
Raul Roco	Aksyon	2,923,842	14.00%	0.17%
Emilio Osmeña	PROMDI	2,454,432	11.76%	−0.68%
Alfredo Lim	Liberal	1,815,664	8.70%	−0.01%
Renato de Villa	Reporma	1,028,854	4.93%	0.07%
Miriam Defensor Santiago	PRP	584,633	2.80%	−0.16%
Juan Ponce Enrile	Independent	297,801	1.43%	0.15%
Imelda Marcos (withdrew)	KBL	232,714	1.11%	N/A
Santiago Dumlao	Kilusan para sa Pambansang Pagpapanibago	29,327	0.14%	0.02%
Manuel Morato	Partido Bansang Marangal	23,208	0.07%	0.04%
Votes		20,877,365	100.00%	—

*Difference from the NAMFREL quick count from the official congressional canvass.

==== Voter demographics ====
1998 presidential vote by demographic subgroup
Demographic subgroup	Estrada	de Venecia	Roco	Osmeña	Other	% of total vote
Total vote	39	16	13	12	20	100
NCR	33	11	28	4	24	9
CAR	47	24	12	0	17	5
Region I - Ilocos	33	61	2	0	4	6
Region II - Cagayan	44	13	4	1	38	5
Region III - Central Luzon	50	15	17	1	17	7
Region IV - Southern Tagalog	45	10	12	1	32	12
Region V - Bicol	14	8	75	0	3	5
Region VI - Western Visayas	40	12	3	9	36	9
Region VII - Central Visayas	20	12	5	52	11	7
Region VIII - Eastern Visayas	48	18	1	23	10	4
Region IX - Western Mindanao	39	19	4	20	18	6
Region X - Northern Mindanao	33	20	3	31	13	5
Region XI - Southern Mindanao	44	12	3	30	11	8
Region XII - Central Mindanao	52	18	3	15	12	6
ARMM	63	25	1	2	9	6

Source: Exit polls conducted by Social Weather Stations on May 12, 100% total (margin of error: 1.3%)

=== For vice-president ===
Arroyo also carried most of the provinces including her home province of Pampanga. Other candidates also carried their home provinces such as Angara of Aurora, and Quezon being mother province, Orbos of Pangasinan, Tatad of Catanduanes and Sueno of South Cotabato.

Only Osmeña of Cebu failed to capture the votes of their home provinces.

Candidate	Party	Votes	%
Gloria Macapagal Arroyo	Lakas–NUCD–UMDP	12,667,252	49.56
Edgardo Angara	Laban ng Makabayang Masang Pilipino	5,652,068	22.11
Oscar Orbos	Partido para sa Demokratikong Reporma–Lapiang Manggagawa	3,321,779	13.00
Serge Osmeña	Liberal Party	2,351,462	9.20
Francisco Tatad	Grand Alliance for Democracy	745,389	2.92
Ismael Sueno	PROMDI	537,677	2.10
Irene Santiago	Aksyon Demokratiko	240,210	0.94
Camilo Sabio	Partido Bansang Marangal	22,010	0.09
Reynaldo Pacheco	Kilusan para sa Pambansang Pagpapanibago	21,422	0.08
Total		25,559,269	100.00
Valid votes		25,559,269	87.28
Invalid/blank votes		3,726,506	12.72
Total votes		29,285,775	100.00
Registered voters/turnout		33,873,665	86.46

Popular vote
Arroyo	49.56%
Angara	22.11%
Orbos	13.00%
Osmeña	9.20%
Others	6.13%

==== NAMFREL quick count ====
Take note that Reynaldo Pacheco had a higher number of votes in the NAMFREL quick count than the official congressional canvass.

NAMFREL quick count result (79.25% of precincts)
Candidate	Party	Results		
Candidate	Party	Votes	%	Diff*
Gloria Macapagal Arroyo	Lakas	9,624,397	48.85%	−0.71%
Edgardo Angara	LDP	4,380,991	22.24%	0.13
Oscar Orbos	Reporma	2,651,184	13.46%	0.46
Sergio Osmeña III	Liberal	1,183,998	9.21%	0.01
Francisco Tatad	PRP/Gabay Bayan	582,548	2.96%	0.05
Ismael Sueno	PROMDI	409,966	2.08%	−0.02
Irene Santiago	Aksyon	196,386	1.00%	0.07
Reynaldo Pacheco	Kilusan para sa Pambansang Pagpapanibago	23,107	0.12%	0.04
Camilo Sabio	Partido Bansang Marangal	19,555	0.10%	0.01
Votes		19,702,132	100.00%	—

*Difference from the NAMFREL quick count from the official congressional canvass.

==== Voter demographics ====
1998 vice presidential vote by demographic subgroup
Demographic subgroup	Arroyo	Angara	Orbos	Osmeña	Other	% of total vote
Total vote	50	21	12	10	7	100
NCR	32	21	33	12	2	9
CAR	60	19	17	3	1	5
Region I - Ilocos	53	15	30	1	1	6
Region II - Cagayan	62	26	10	2	0	5
Region III - Central Luzon	66	16	11	6	1	7
Region IV - Southern Tagalog	45	29	17	7	2	12
Region V - Bicol	48	14	4	5	29	5
Region VI - Western Visayas	46	28	4	15	7	9
Region VII - Central Visayas	45	17	2	25	11	7
Region VIII - Eastern Visayas	67	18	1	13	1	4
Region IX - Western Mindanao	59	18	5	15	3	6
Region X - Northern Mindanao	58	21	3	16	2	5
Region XI - Southern Mindanao	50	20	5	13	12	8
Region XII - Central Mindanao	56	21	3	9	11	6
ARMM	58	30	6	4	2	6

Source: Exit polls conducted by Social Weather Stations on May 12, 100% total (margin of error: 1.4%)

== See also ==
- Commission on Elections
- Politics of the Philippines
- Philippine elections
- President of the Philippines
- 11th Congress of the Philippines
