= Party of Democratic Reform =

The Party of Democratic Reform may refer to:

- Social Democratic Party of Croatia, that held the name League of Communists of Croatia - Party of Democratic Reform during a period in the early 1990s
- Partido ñg Demokratikong Reporma-Lapiang Manggagawa, a political party in the Philippines
- Party of Democratic Reform (Russia)
- Party of Democratic Reform (Thailand)
