= Haydee Yorac =

Filipina politician (1941–2005)

The Honorable Haydee B. Yorac
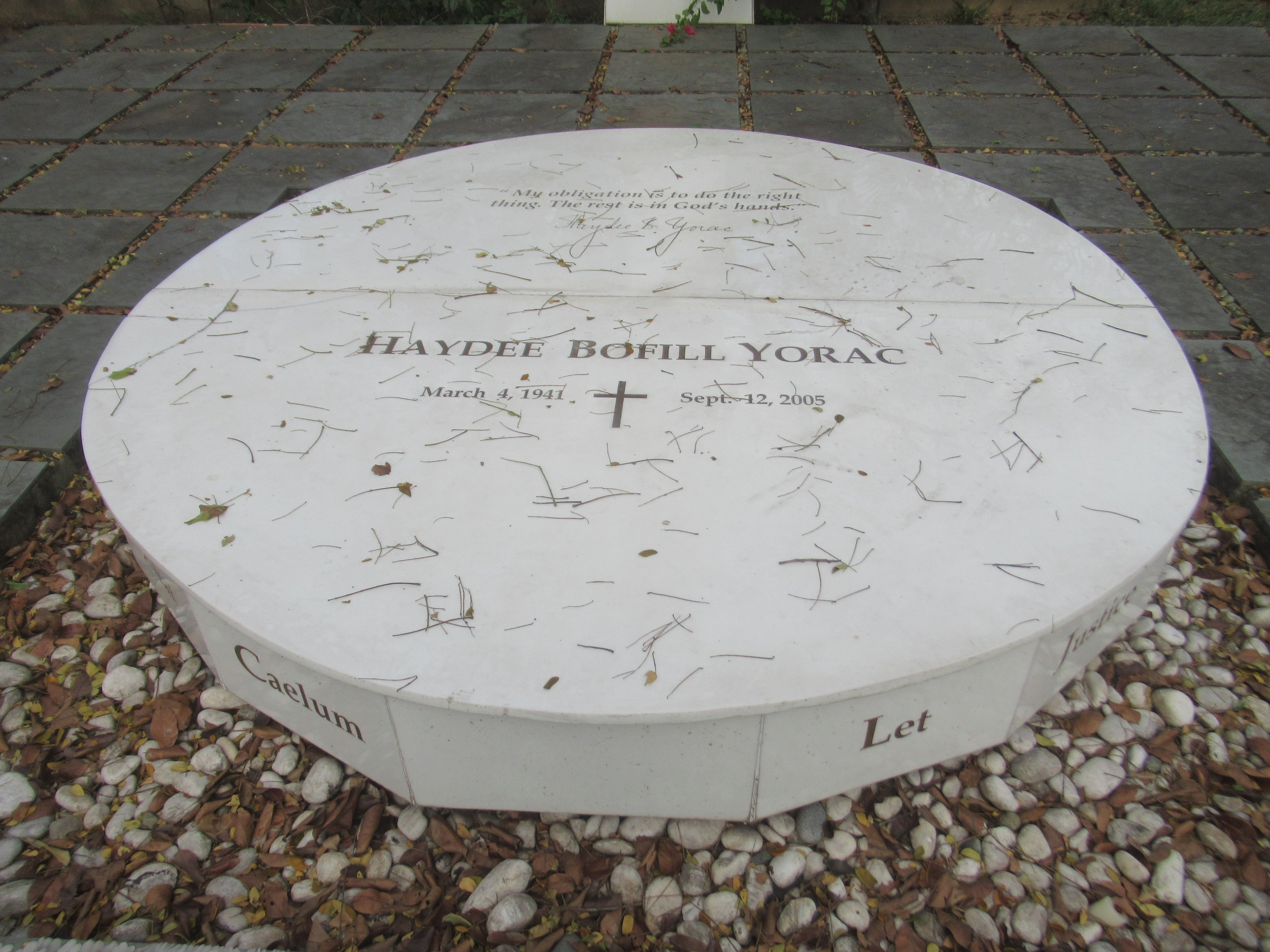

Chairperson of the Commission on Elections
- Acting
- In office January 12, 1990 – June 5, 1991
- Appointed by: Corazon Aquino
- Preceded by: Hilario Davide Jr.
- Succeeded by: Christian Monsod

Commissioner on Elections
- In office July 15, 1986 – February 11, 1993

Chairperson of the Presidential Commissioner on Good Government
- In office July 17, 2001 – September 12, 2005
- Preceded by: Jorge V. Sarmiento
- Succeeded by: Camilo Sabio

Personal details
- Born: March 4, 1941 Saravia, Negros Occidental, Commonwealth of the Philippines
- Died: September 12, 2005 (aged 64) Chicago, Illinois, U.S.
- Education: University of the Philippines Diliman (LL.B.); Yale University (LL.M.)

Haydee Bofill Yorac (/ˈhaɪdi/; Spanish pronunciation: [ajˈde.e] March 4, 1941 — September 12, 2005) was a Filipina public servant, law professor and politician. She was its first female acting chairperson (1990-1991).

== Early life ==
Yorac was born on March 4, 1941, in the municipality of Saravia (now E. B. Magalona), Negros Occidental to Jose Yorac and Josefa Bofill. She earned a Bachelor of Laws from the University of the Philippines Diliman in 1962. She placed 8th in the 1962 Philippine Bar Examinations, with an 86.95% rating. She was a member of the Order of the Purple Feather (Law Honor Society) while a student of law. She also earned a Master of Laws major in public international law, minor in anthropology from Yale University in New Haven, Connecticut, in 1981.

== Martial law ==
When Ferdinand Marcos placed the Philippines under martial law on September 23, 1972, he arrested various lawyers, academics, and intellectuals who were likely to lead protests against the move. Yorac was among the first to be arrested, and was imprisoned in Camp Crame for three months. Upon her release, Yorac volunteered her services to the Free Legal Assistance Group (FLAG), notably helping Lino Brocka and Behn Cervantes when they were charged with inciting to sedition in 1984.

== Private career ==
Yorac taught and served in the Admissions Screening Committee of the University of the Philippines College of Law. She was an assistant vice president for academic affairs at the University of the Philippines Diliman and a senior researcher at the University of the Philippines Law Center. She also became the chief legal counsel of the University of the Philippines for a few years.

== Public career ==
She was appointed by then President Corazon Aquino to serve as commissioner of the Philippine Commission on Elections (COMELEC) in 1986.

She was also a key figure in the new government's peace process, having served as chairperson of the National Unification Council, a predecessor of the Office of the Presidential Adviser on the Peace Process, which was created on the council's recommendation in July 1993.

Yorac vied for a seat in the Philippine Senate in the 1998 national elections through the Reporma–LM party of Renato de Villa but lost.

== Death ==
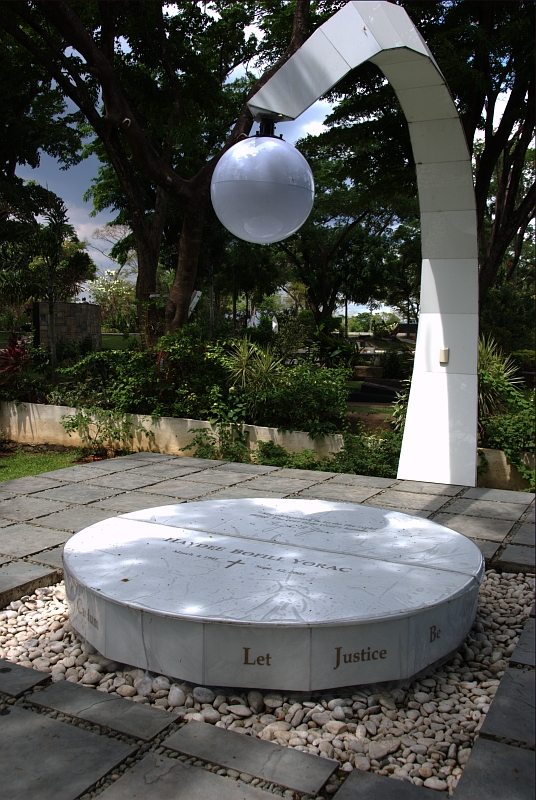
Haydee Yorac's tomb at the Libingan ng mga Bayani.

Yorac battled with ovarian cancer and died on September 12, 2005, in Chicago, aged 64. Her remains were buried at the Libingan ng mga Bayani. She was succeeded as PCGG chair by Camilo Sabio.

== Legacy ==
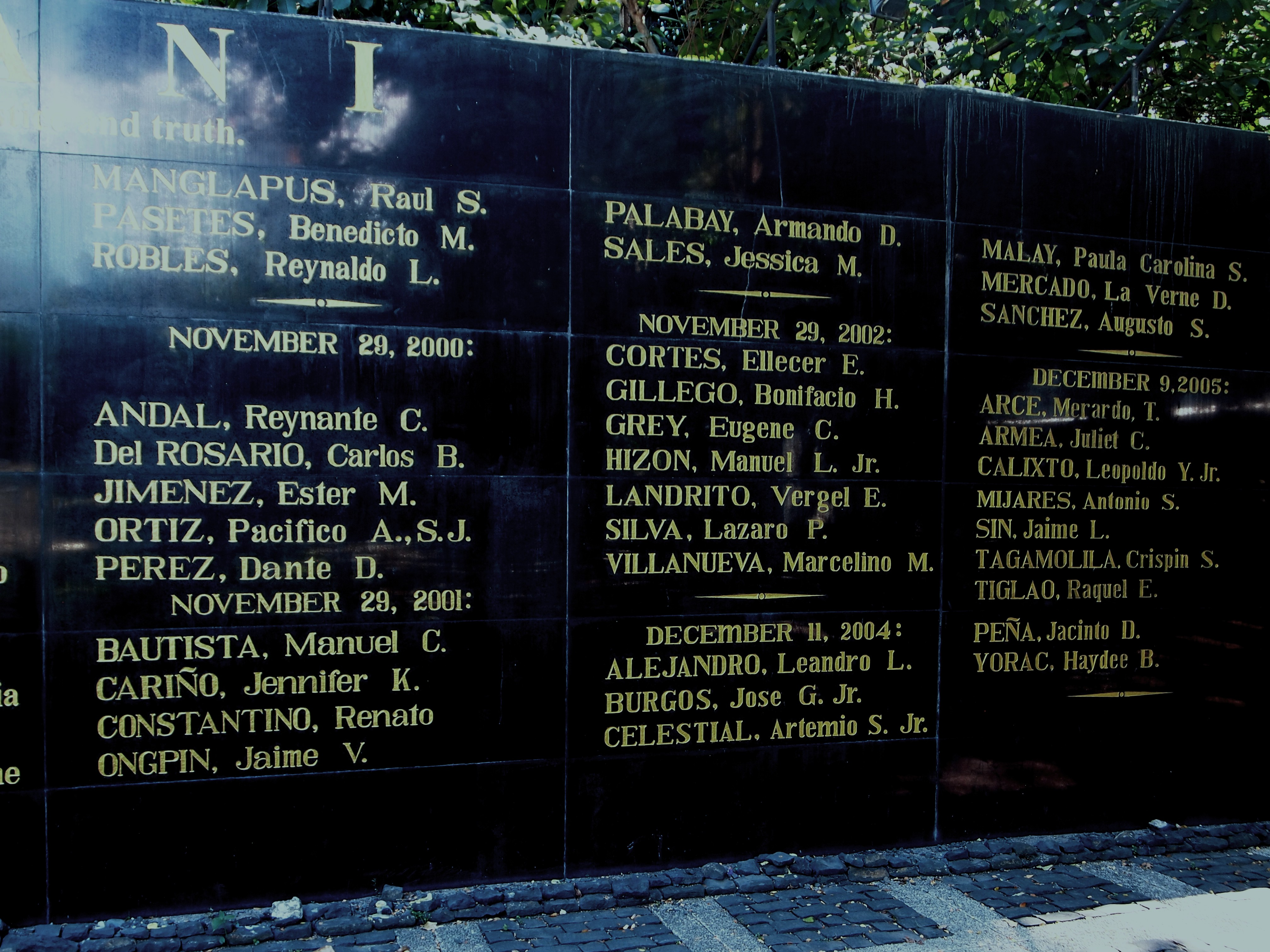
Detail of the Wall of Remembrance at the Bantayog ng mga Bayani, showing names from the 2005 batch of Bantayog Honorees, including that of Haydee Yorac.

For her activism and volunteer legal work during martial law, and for her later work at the Commission on Elections and the Presidential Commission on Good Government, Yorac was honored upon her death by having her name etched on the Wall of Remembrance of the Philippines' Bantayog ng mga Bayani, which honors the martyrs and heroes who fought to defeat the Marcos dictatorship.

== Publications ==
- "Legal Status of Mercenaries"
- "Preventive Detention and Metaphysics of Repression"
- "Child Custody Determinations: A Reappraisal"
- "The Philippine Claim to the Spratly Island Group," Philippine Law Journal
- Philippine Treaty Series, Vols. 1–4, 6–7 (editor)

== Professional and civic affiliations ==
- Integrated Bar of the Philippines
- Philippine Society of International Law
- American Society of International Law
- Free Legal Assistance Group (National Board Member)
- U.P. Alpha Phi Omega sorority (Formerly U.P. Kappa Phi Omega Sorority)

Preceded by Hilario Davide, Jr.	COMELEC Chairman; 1989–1989	Succeeded by Christian Monsod
