= Lito Osmeña =

Filipino politician (1938–2021)

Chief Economic Adviser to the President of the Philippines
- In office 1993–1997
- President: Fidel V. Ramos

22nd Governor of Cebu
- In office February 2, 1988 – June 30, 1992
- Vice Governor: Enrique P. Rama
- Preceded by: Osmundo G. Rama
- Succeeded by: Vicente L. dela Serna

Personal details
- Born: Emilio Mario Renner Osmeña Jr. September 11, 1938 Cebu City, Cebu, Commonwealth of the Philippines
- Died: July 19, 2021 (aged 82) Cebu City, Philippines
- Party: PROMDI (1997–2021); Lakas (1992–1997)
- Spouse: Annette Versoza
- Relations: Sergio Osmeña (grandfather); Serge Osmeña (cousin)
- Children: 3
- Education: University of San Carlos

Emilio Mario Renner Osmeña Jr. (September 11, 1938 – July 19, 2021), better known as Lito Osmeña, was a Filipino politician. A grandson of former president Sergio Osmeña, he served as Governor of Cebu from 1988 to 1992. He was the founding chairman of PROMDI, under which he ran for President of the Philippines in the 1998 Philippine presidential election but lost to Joseph Estrada. He also ran for Vice President as the running mate of Fidel V. Ramos in the 1992 national elections but lost also to Estrada, six years before the latter would defeat him again.

== Early life and career ==
Lito was born on September 11, 1938 in Cebu City to Emilio Veloso Osmeña and Maria Luisa Renner. He graduated with a Bachelor of Science degree in Business Administration from the University of San Carlos in Cebu. Early in life, Lito managed Hacienda Lugo. He developed Maria Luisa Estate Park, a family owned residential subdivision.

In 1973, he became a political prisoner during Martial Law at Fort Bonifacio for nine months, and was placed under house arrest for four years. After his release, he focused on developing real estate projects. It was not until the assassination of former senator Ninoy Aquino in 1983 that Osmeña got involved in politics. He ran for governor of Cebu in 1988 and won.

== Governor of Cebu ==
Osmeña served as the governor of Cebu from February 2, 1988, to June 30, 1992.

=== Economic reforms ===
After the reorganization of local governments and the ratification of the 1987 Constitution, he ran for the position of governor for the province of Cebu in 1988 and won. During his term as Governor of Cebu, Osmeña was able to increase the provincial budget to 1 billion pesos per annum. He made possible the construction of flyovers and causeways, and purchased heavy equipment that caused the opening and maintenance of several barangay roads and bridges as well as the farm-to-market roads and began construction of the Transcentral Highway, connecting Cebu City to the West. Osmeña launched a Water Distribution Program in the entire island, making water available to 90% of the population, as opposed to the 56% before his incumbency. He set up the municipal telephone system throughout the province. Osmeña initiated the modernization of Cebu's Mactan International Airport (now Mactan–Cebu International Airport). He also worked with Fr. Francisco G. Silva in developing "Rural Electrification" for remote areas of the province. He also initiated direct flights from Cebu to the different parts of the world. He was elected as Chairman of the League of Governors of the Philippines from 1990 to 1992. It was during his watch as Governor of Cebu that Cebu experienced an economic boom.

=== 1992 vice presidential election ===
After Fidel V. Ramos bolted the Laban in 1992, he invited Osmeña to his newly created party Lakas and offered to be his running mate in the May 11 elections. Osmeña accepted Ramos' invitation and accepted his offer citing his vision to follow his grandfather's footsteps. He however lost to Joseph Estrada in a 7-way race for Vice President.

== Post-governorship ==
=== Chief economic adviser ===
Osmeña served as Executive Vice President of Lakas and Chief Economic Adviser of President Fidel V. Ramos from 1993 to 1997. He also Chaired the Presidential Committee on Flagship Programs and Projects and finished or substantially undertook the following projects: The General Santos Airport, the Mactan Cebu International Airport, the upgrading of the Batangas port, the upgrading of the General Santos Seaport, the Rehabilitation of the Pan-Philippine Highway, the Quirino Highway, the Southern Tagalog Arterial Road (Sto. Tomas-Lipa Section), C-5 Road (from South Luzon Expressway to Katipunan Avenue), the Metro Manila Skyway Stage 1 (Buendia to Bicutan), the EDSA-Boni Avenue underpass, the Kalayaan Flyover, the Ayala-Pasay Road interchange, the EDSA-Shaw flyover, the Bohol Circumferential Road, the Bataan Combined Cycle Power Plant (600MW), the Palimpinon Geothermal Plant (80MW), the Pagbilao Plant (700MW), the Upper Mahiao & Malitbog Geothermal Plant in Leyte (231MW), the Rehabilitation of PNR South Main Line, Line 2, Line 3 and the Deregulation of the Telecom Sector.

=== 1998 presidential election ===
In 1997, he bolted Lakas and formed his own party he called Probinsya Muna Development Initiative or PROMDI, with Ismael Sueño as his running mate. Both of them ran for the position of president and vice president in the 11-way presidential election but lost to Joseph Estrada, and Gloria Macapagal Arroyo respectively.

=== Later activities ===
Osmeña returned to private life after the elections handling the party he founded as a party-list party. In the House of Representatives, the party was represented by Joy Augustus Young. Osmeña did not run in the 2004 elections and supported his former political rival Raul Roco's presidential run. His party was disqualified in the party list elections, citing that the party was a national political party.

Osmeña ran in 2010 elections for senator, but lost.

== Personal life ==
Lito, as he was often called, was married to Annette Versoza and had three children, namely Mariano, Maria Luisa, and Emilio III. He had eight grand children – Annette, Santino, Marie, Katrien, Alexander, Emilio IV, Illeana, and Julia. Lito was part of the Osmeña clan, a very influential political family in the Philippines. Other prominent family members include former Senators Sergio Osmeña III, John Henry Osmeña and Sergio Osmeña Jr.; former Cebu City Mayor Tomas Osmeña, former President Sergio Osmeña, former Cebu Vice Governor John Gregory Osmeña, as well as his sister, real estate developer Annabelle "Annie" Osmeña-Aboitiz.

== Death ==
Osmeña died on July 19, 2021, in his hometown of Cebu City from COVID-19. He was 82 years old. His wife Annette also died from complications of the virus two weeks later, on July 31.
