= Dial M (Philippine TV program) =

Philippine public service talk show

- Created by: National Broadcasting Network
- Developed by: Philippine Charity Sweepstakes Office
- Starring: Manuel Morato; Maggie Dela Riva
- Country of origin: Philippines
- No. of episodes: n/a (airs only)

Production
- Running time: 1 hour

Original release
- Network: National Broadcasting Network (1995–98, 2003–10); Intercontinental Broadcasting Corporation (2010)
- Release: April 4, 1995 – 2010

Dial M is a Philippine television public service show broadcast by PTV/NBN and IBC. Hosted by Manuel Morato and Maggie Dela Riva, it aired on PTV from 1995 to 1998. The show returned to NBN from 2003 to 2010 and IBC in 2010. It was simulcasted on DZRJ 810 AM. It airs Tuesday and Thursday evenings. It requires your comments and suggestions live.

== Hosts ==
- Manuel Morato†
- Maggie Dela Riva

== See also ==
- List of programs broadcast by People's Television Network
