= Raul Roco =

Filipino politician (1941–2005)

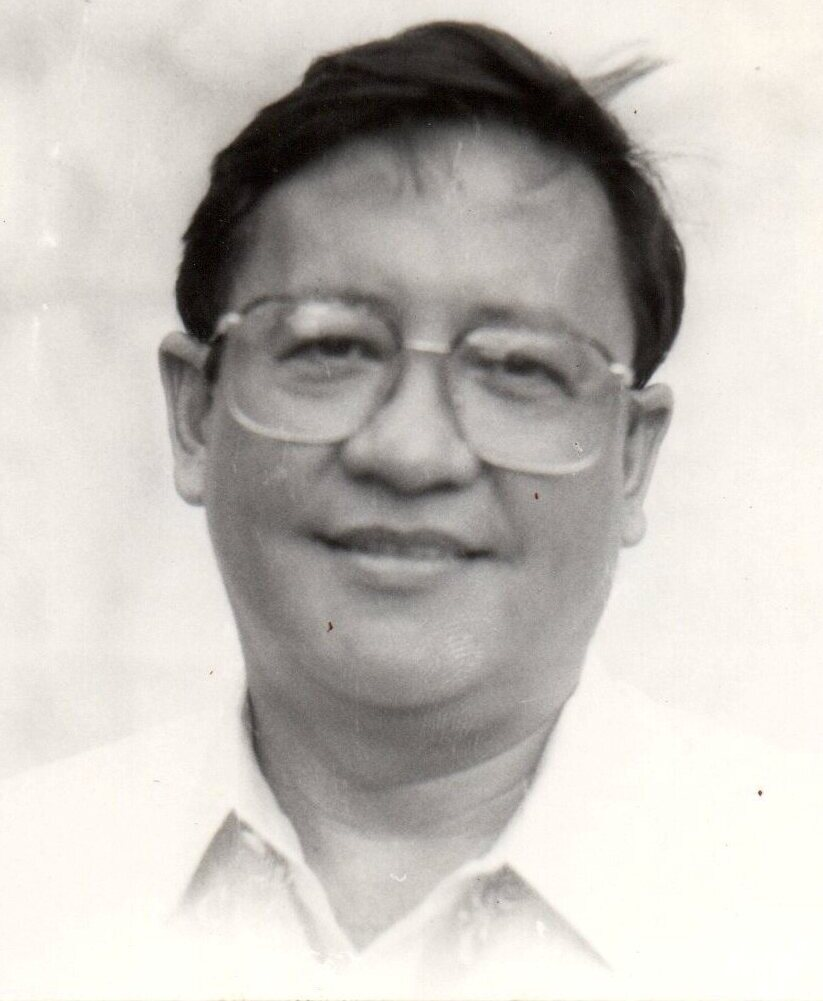

46th Secretary of Education Secretary of Education, Culture and Sports (2001)
- In office January 22, 2001 – August 31, 2002
- President: Gloria Macapagal Arroyo
- Preceded by: Br. Andrew Gonzalez (DECS Secretary)
- Succeeded by: Edilberto de Jesus

Senator of the Philippines
- In office June 30, 1992 – February 9, 2001

Member of the House of Representatives from Camarines Sur's 2nd District
- In office June 30, 1987 – June 30, 1992
- Preceded by: post last held by Felix A. Fuentebella
- Succeeded by: Celso Baguio

Personal details
- Born: Raul Sagarbarria Roco; October 26, 1941 Naga, Camarines Sur, Commonwealth of the Philippines
- Died: August 5, 2005 (aged 63) Quezon City, Philippines
- Party: Aksyon (1997–2005)
- Other political affiliations: LDP (1988–1997); UNIDO (1987–1988)
- Spouse: Sonia C. Malasarte
- Children: 6
- Education: San Beda College (BA, LL.B); University of Pennsylvania (LL.M)
- Occupation: Lawyer, Politician, Film Producer, Musician

Raul Sagarbarria Roco (October 26, 1941 – August 5, 2005) was a Filipino politician. He was the founder and presidential nominee of Aksyon Demokratiko, which he founded in 1997 as a vehicle for his presidential bid in 1998 and his second one in 2004. He was a former constitutional delegate, congressman, senator and Secretary of Education under the presidency of Gloria Macapagal Arroyo.

He had a strong following among young voters in the Philippines due to his efforts to promote honesty and good governance.

== Early life and education ==
Raul Roco was born in Naga in the Philippine province of Camarines Sur, the son of farmer Sulpicio Azuela Roco and public school teacher Rosario Orlanda Sagarbarria.

Roco finished elementary school at age 10 from Naga Parochial School, and high school at age 14 from Ateneo de Naga. He graduated magna cum laude from San Beda College (now San Beda University) in Manila with a degree in English in 1960. Then, he was also the Editor-in-Chief of The Bedan working with the likes of Rene Saguisag and Jaime Licauco. Later, Roco received a Bachelor of Laws degree (also at San Beda College) and was the college's Abbott Awardee for Over-All Excellence. In the United States, he obtained his Master of Laws at the University of Pennsylvania, while also cross-enrolled at Wharton School where he took up multinational studies. Roco also wrote the official school lyrics, "The Bedan Hymn" as a student. Fr. Benildus Maramba OSB collaborated and composed the hymn.

He was the president of the National Union of Students of the Philippines in 1961 and was named one of the Ten Outstanding Students of the Philippines in 1964. His wife Sonia was the Most Outstanding Student that same year.

As a result of his various other achievements, he had been awarded seven honorary doctorates.

== Political career ==
After he passed the bar in 1965, Roco lobbied for the holding of a Constitutional Convention that aimed to amend the 1935 Philippine Constitution. He campaigned for a seat to represent his district in Camarines Sur. He won and thus became convention's youngest Bicolano delegate.

He became one the legal staff of the late Philippine Senator Benigno "Ninoy" Aquino, and he drafted the Study Now, Pay Later law.

From 1983 to 1985, he served as president of the Integrated Bar of the Philippines. Under his term, he questioned Ferdinand Marcos presidential decrees.

Alongside his work in law, he has also served as a film producer. In 1974, he was the executive producer of the late film director Lino Brocka's film Tinimbang Ka Ngunit Kulang, which won six FAMAS awards that year, including Best Film.

Among all legislators of the Eighth Congress of the Philippines (which lasted from 1987 to 1992), he was adjudged by the Ford Foundation and the University of the Philippines Institute of Strategic and Development Studies as first in over-all performance.

=== Senate ===
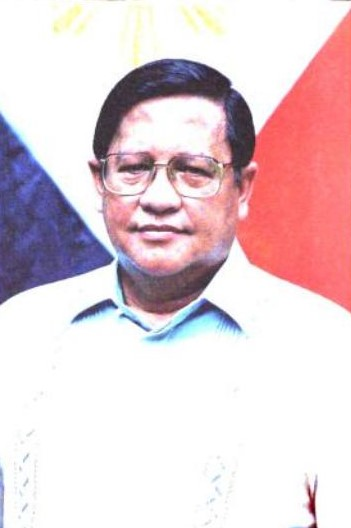
Official portrait, 1997

Roco was elected to the Senate in 1992 and 1995 serving until 2001, making many contributions that led many to recognize him as an "outstanding senator". He wrote the law which reformed the nation's banking system; this earned him the title "Father of the Bangko Sentral". Some other laws that he wrote resulted in the liberalization of the banking industry and the strengthening of the thrift banks. In addition, he wrote the Intellectual Property Code and the Securities Regulation Code.

As senator, Roco opposed the reinstitution of capital punishment in Philippine law, stating that "Even in the darkest days of martial law, when death was the ready punishment, there were more killings, more tortures, more inhumane crimes committed. Death did not deter then. It will not deter now." In 1994, he also filed a case before the Supreme Court against a newly approved law restructuring the value-added tax (Republic Act No. 7716), arguing that it is potentially unconstitutional for including books and other mass media in the tax.

Roco, serving as vice chairman of the Senate Committee on Basic Education, Arts and Culture, has also made several contributions to education in the Philippines. In 1994, Roco supported the abolition of the National College Entrance Examination (NCEE), which was put in place by President Ferdinand Marcos in 1978. He helped fund the teachers' cooperatives as well as the increment mandated by the Magna Carta for Public School Teachers for retiring public school teachers. On the students' side, he helped bring computers into Philippine universities, colleges, and public schools. In addition, he devised a plan for meal scholarships for poor students at the Philippine Normal University.

Roco wrote several bills targeted at protecting and prioritizing women in the Philippines. He wrote the Women in Nation Building Law, the Nursing Act, the Anti-Sexual Harassment Law, the Anti-Rape Law, and the Child and Family Courts Act. He also let women play major roles in the Department of Education's literacy program. Out of thanks to his services for women, many women's groups named him an "Honorary Woman".

He also drafted a bill that abolished double taxation on Filipinos working abroad.

He was given the Bantay Katarungan award by Kilosbayan for playing an integral role in the Senate impeachment trial of then-president Joseph Estrada who was impeached by the House of Representatives on 2000 for graft and corruption, bribery, betrayal of public trust, and culpable violation of the 1987 Philippine Constitution. Unfortunately, the impeachment trial was not concluded and in 2001, Estrada was ousted from power by another People Power uprising.

=== As Secretary of Education ===
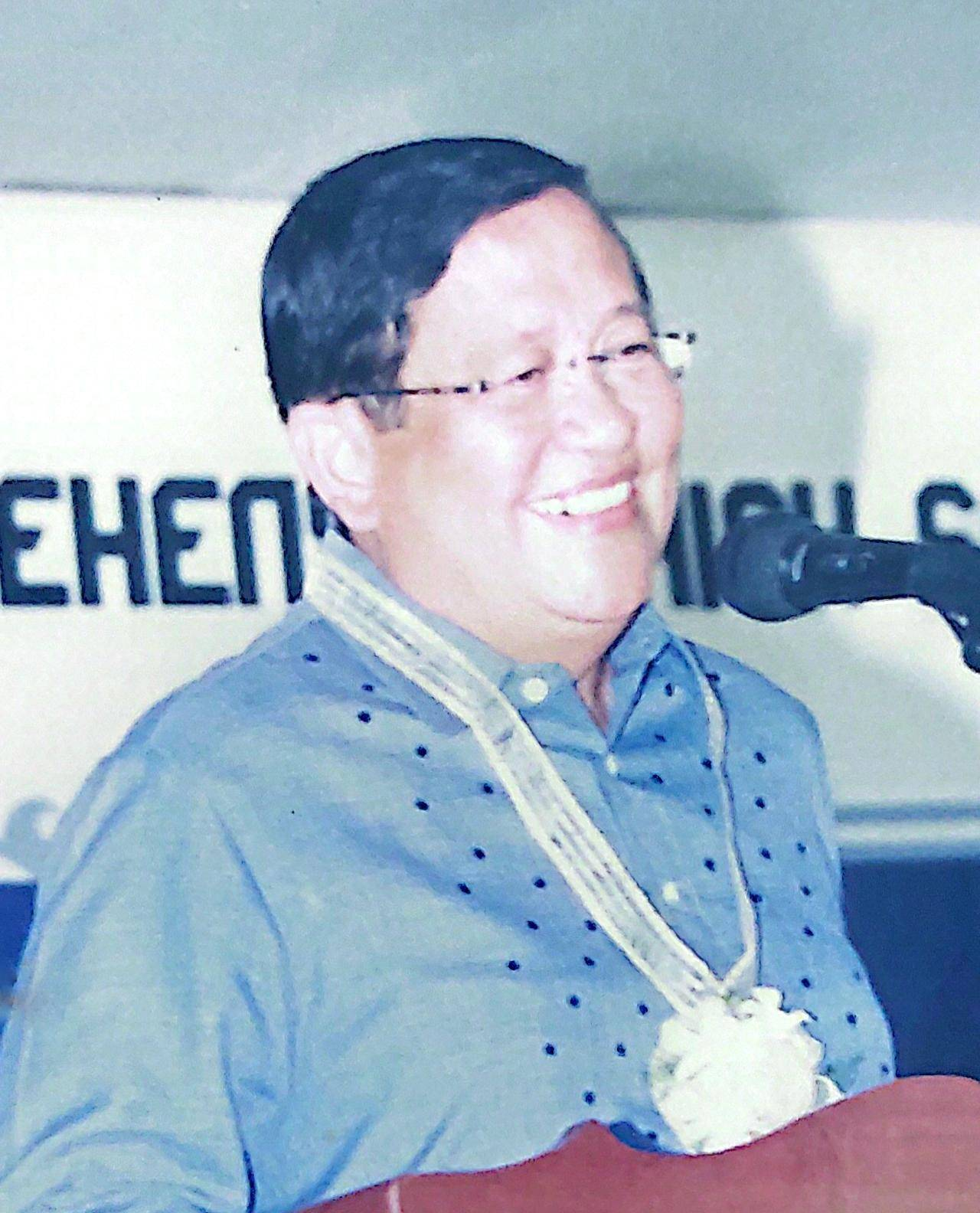
Roco in 2002

Roco took over as education secretary of the Philippines in 2001, at a time when the Philippines had not only one of the ten most corrupt governments in the world (according to Transparency International), but its Department of Education was also the fourth-most corrupt of its agencies (as named by the Asia Foundation - Social Weather Stations Survey of Enterprises on Public Sector Corruption). To combat this corruption, Roco imposed a department-wide transparency policy which also held employees accountable for the purchase of textbooks, which had been a major source of the department's corruption. This allowed the department to purchase textbooks for a much lower price, and after just eight months under Roco's leadership, the Department of Education gained a 73% public approval rating and became the most trusted government agency in the Philippines.

During his tenure in that position, Roco allowed free public education (through high school) as required by the Philippine Constitution. He also enacted a reform of basic education curriculum in order that children would focus their studies on reading, writing, arithmetic, science, and Makabayan. In addition, he made sure that teachers were paid promptly and ended the 3% "service fee" that the department had long been deducting from teachers' pay.

== Candidacy for President ==
=== 1998 ===
Roco ran for president in the 1998 Philippine election. He lost to Vice-President Joseph Estrada but had a remarkable showing in a field of eleven candidates despite being an independent candidate. His strong showing was attributed to the widespread support he received from young Filipinos who eventually formed his party, Aksyon Demokratiko, and its youth arm, Aksyon Kabataan. Party leaders then included Jaime Galvez Tan, Lorna Patajo-Kapunan and Darwin Mariano.

=== 2004 ===
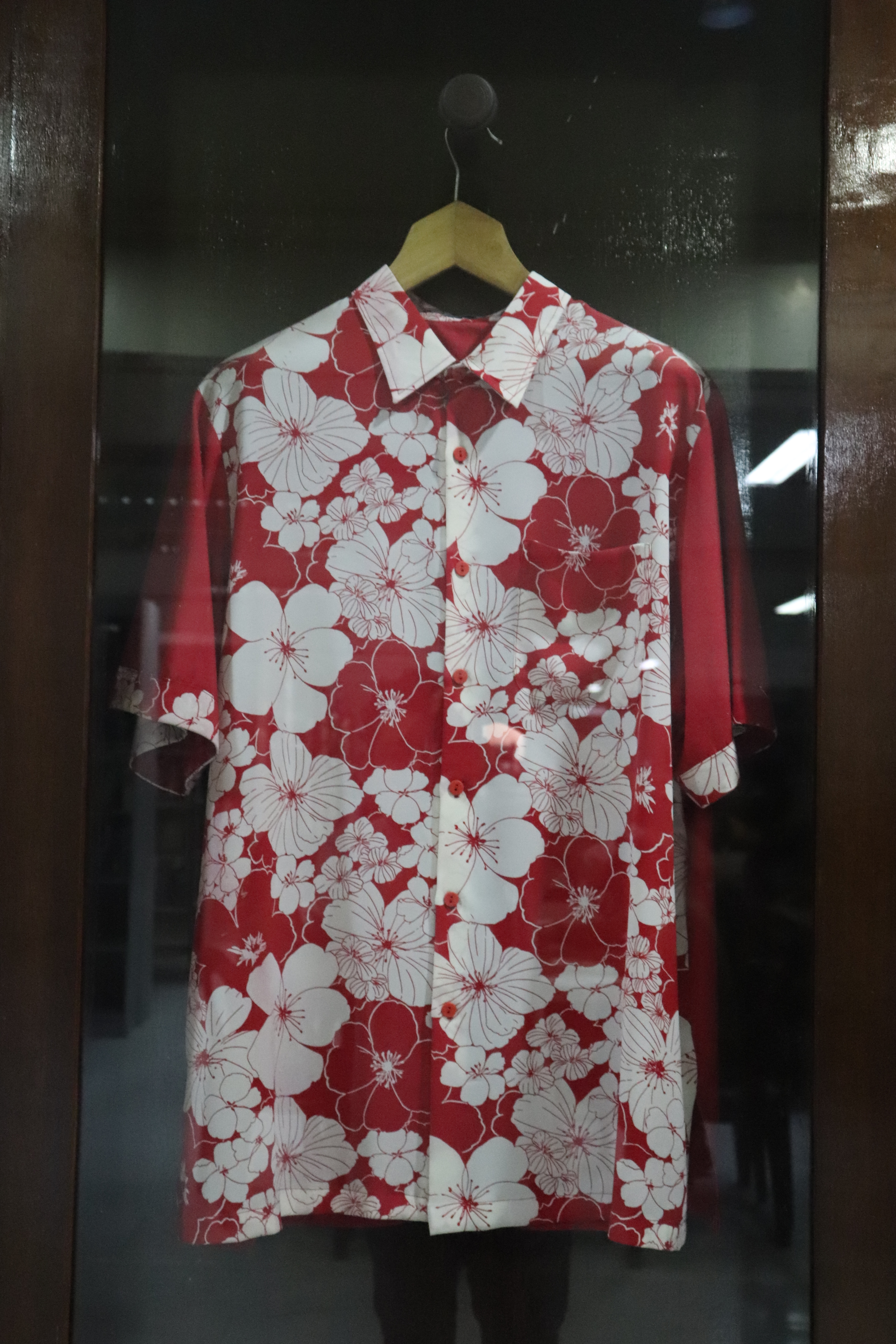
An iconic red floral polo of late DepEd Secretary Raul Roco worn during his campaigns

Roco rode his success in the Department of Education into a run for the Philippine presidency in 2004. His candidacy was based on his ability to fight corruption and to display fair play, decency, and honor. His Aksyon Demokratiko party formed a coalition with Promdi and Reporma, the parties of 1998 presidential candidates Lito Osmeña and Rene de Villa, to form the Alyansa ng Pag-asa (Alliance of Hope).

Roco was a front-runner in pre-election surveys and was considered a strong contender. However, during the campaign, he battled with recurrence of his cancer, after remission from his bout with prostate cancer in 1996. His illness forced him to leave the campaign trail for medical attention in the United States. Doctors told him that his condition was not life-threatening and that he could continue his run for the presidency. He returned to the campaign trail, but concerns about his illness greatly diminished his support.

He lost the election to the incumbent, Gloria Macapagal Arroyo, and finished fourth in a field of five candidates.

He was the President of Aksyon Demokratiko until his death.

== Personal life ==
Roco was married to Sonia Cubillo Malasarte from Bohol. They had six children (Robbie Pierre, Raul Jr., Sophia, Sareena, Rex and Synara).

Roco was noted to have loved poetry, literature and music, playing Cole Porter songs on the piano at a dinner party organized by Eugenia Apostol in the mid-1990s.

== Death ==
On 5 August 2005, Raul Roco died of prostate cancer, at St Luke's Medical Center in Quezon City. He was buried on August 11 in Naga City, Camarines Sur.

His widow, Sonia, ran for being a Senator under the Genuine Opposition (formerly United Opposition) umbrella in the May 14, 2007 midterm elections and 2010 Philippine presidential election but lost. She still represents the party he started, Aksyon Demokratiko, hoping to continue the advocacies that her late husband had started.

== See also ==
- 2004 Philippine general election
- 1998 Philippine general election

House of Representatives of the Philippines
Recreated Title last held by Felix Fuentebella	Representative, Camarines Sur's 2nd District; 1987–1992	Succeeded by Celso Baguio
Political offices
Preceded by Br. Andrew Gonzalez	Secretary of Education; 2001–2002	Succeeded by Edilberto de Jesus
Party political offices
First	Aksyon Demokratiko nominee for President of the Philippines and Senate of the Philippines; 1998, and 2004	Vacant Title next held by Isko Moreno
