= Manuel Morato =

Filipino politician (1935–2021)

Chairperson of the Movie and Television Review and Classification Board
- In office February 25, 1986 – June 30, 1992
- President: Corazon Aquino
- Preceded by: Maria Kalaw Katigbak
- Succeeded by: Henrietta Silos Mendez

Chairperson of the Philippine Charity Sweepstakes Office
- In office 1994–1998
- President: Fidel V. Ramos
- Preceded by: Mita Pardo de Tavera

Personal details
- Born: Manuel Lim Morato; 17 November 1935 Calauag, Tayabas, Philippine Islands
- Died: 30 July 2021 (aged 87) Quezon City, Philippines
- Party: Independent (2001–2021); Partido Bansang Marangal (1998–2001); Lakas–NUCD (until 1998)
- Relatives: Tomás Morató (father)
- Occupation: Politician, television host

Manuel "Manoling" Lim Morato (November 17, 1935 – July 30, 2021) was a Filipino politician and television host who previously served as chairperson of both the Movie and Television Review and Classification Board (MTRCB) and the Philippine Charity Sweepstakes Office (PCSO).

== Early life and family ==
Manuel Morato was born on November 17, 1935, the eldest son of Tomás Morató, who became the first Mayor of Quezon City, and Consuelo Eclavea Lim. He would later have 11 other siblings, including a brother, Francisco, who is a doctor and lawyer, and a sister, Elvira, the grandmother of actor Jake Cuenca.

In 2019, Morato and his siblings were involved in a dispute over their family's ancestral home at 99 Scout Gandia Street in Quezon City, allegedly because the property had been sold to a developer by his youngest brother, José ("Pepito"), without the other siblings agreeing to the sale.

== In government ==
Morato was appointed by President Corazon Aquino in 1986 as Chairman of the Movie and Television Review and Classification Board. A strict Catholic moralist who proclaimed the value of celibacy, Morato quickly earned the ire of the movie industry with his ultraconservatism, which led to a crackdown on films that were deemed immoral or having illicit content. Among them were local pornographic movies, the Martin Scorsese film The Last Temptation of Christ, which was banned over its alleged anti-religion theme and the locally produced films Dear Uncle Sam and Lino Brocka's Orapronobis, which dealt with the US Bases issue and human rights, respectively.

In the 1992 elections, Morato ran for the position of Philippine senator but lost.

In the 1998 elections, he founded the Partido Bansang Marangal (Noble Nation Party) and ran for President with Camilo Sabio as his running mate, but lost to Vice President Joseph Estrada, earning last place in the results.

In the 2001 elections, he ran for the position of senator and again lost.

== TV shows and movies ==
Morato hosted a weekly talk show Dial-M with former actress Maggie de la Riva on state-owned National Broadcasting Network (now PTV 4). The show was initially for lotto draw results but he decided to add his commentaries and viewer phone calls. One of its episodes featured a security camera video showing Joseph Estrada gambling in a casino. The show was cut off in 1998 when Estrada ascended to the presidency and was returned in 2004 when Arroyo appointed him as board director of the PCSO.

His life was filmed in 1998 with the role portrayed by actor Joel Torre.

In August 2011, he was charged with four counts of election offences, accusing him of using his television show to campaign for Gilbert Teodoro.

== Senate hearings on PCSO corruption ==
In 2011, the Philippine Senate uncovered the fact that under Morato, the PCSO never assisted any non-Catholic religious organizations. Morato said that other religions are also allowed to request the same type of assistance from the PCSO, but could not name any non-Catholic religious organizations or leaders who received similar donations from the PCSO.

== Death ==
Morato died of complications from COVID-19 on July 30, 2021, at the age of 87.
