= Camilo Sabio =

Filipino politician

Chairman of Presidential Commission on Good Government
- In office May 2, 2005 – September 12, 2010
- President: Gloria Macapagal Arroyo; Benigno Aquino III
- Preceded by: Haydee Yorac
- Succeeded by: Andres D. Bautista

Personal details
- Born: June 16, 1936 (age 90)
- Party: Independent (2001–present); Partido Bansang Marangal (1998–2001)
- Education: Xavier University – Ateneo de Cagayan (BA); Ateneo de Manila University (LL.B)
- Occupation: Politician
- Profession: Lawyer

Camilo Sabio (born June 16, 1936) is a public lawyer and past chairman of the Philippines' Presidential Commission on Good Government. He previously held the position of Secretary-General in the Philippine House of Representatives from 1992 to 1998 under Jose de Venecia.

== Early life ==
Sabio achieved his Bachelor of Arts degree from Xavier University – Ateneo de Cagayan as valedictorian with a gold medal for academic excellence. He finished his Bachelor of Laws from the Ateneo de Manila University also as valedictorian with gold medal for academic excellence. Joined the Law Firm of Feria, Manglapus & Associates. He was a professor, Political Law, Constitutional Law, Administrative Law, and International Law in the Ateneo de Manila Law School.

== Politics ==
Sabio was Davao delegate to the 1971 Constitutional Convention. For 20 years, he served as Chief Counsel of the Federation of Free Farmers (FFF) and of the Federation of Free Workers (FFW). He served as Chief of Staff of the Presidential Assistant for Legal Affairs, and Office of the President. Later he worked as Chief of Staff of the Senior Associate Justice Jose Y. Feria. He was a Secretary General (unanimously elected for three terms), and, concurrently Chief Counsel and Chief Parliamentarian of the House of Representatives.

In the 1998 elections, Sabio ran for the position of Vice President as a running mate of lottery company manager Manuel Morato under the Partido Bansang Marangal (National Dignity Party). However he lost to Senator Gloria Macapagal Arroyo. He served as a President of the Philippine Constitutional Association (PhilConsA) from 1998 to 2002. He was appointed by President Gloria Macapagal Arroyo as chairman of the PCGG in 2005 when its previous chairperson, Haydee Yorac died of ovarian cancer and took his oath May 2, 2005.

== Conviction and other controversies ==
In January 2011, the PCGG published the Preliminary Report for the Truth Commission, that Sabio who was a Commissioner from 2006 to 2010, had allegedly unliquidated cash advances amounting to PhP2,158,692.99. Sabio was also figured in the utilization of government funds in escrow with the Philippine National Bank for excessive travels, such as one trip to Rio de Janeiro with 19 members of the Commission withdrawing more than US$160,000.00. It was also questionable when Sabio appointed his own brother-in-law as counsel of PCGG in New York.

In 2012, the Office of the Ombudsman found Sabio guilty of grave misconduct for attempting to influence his younger brother, Court of Appeals (CA) Associate Justice Jose Sabio Jr., in the GSIS-Meralco bribery case.

In June 2017, Camilo Sabio was found guilty of two counts of graft by the Sandiganbayan First Division and sentenced to 12 to 20 years imprisonment for alleged anomalous lease of vehicles in 2007 and 2009. In September 2017, the National Bureau of Investigation arrested Sabio over charges of graft, malversation of funds and corrupt practices.

On November 23, 2023, the Supreme Court affirmed the decision of the Sandiganbayn, and permanently disqualified Sabio from holding any government office, be appointed in any government owned or controlled corporation, or take the Civil Service Examination.
