= Serge Osmeña =

Filipino politician

Sergio Osmeña III
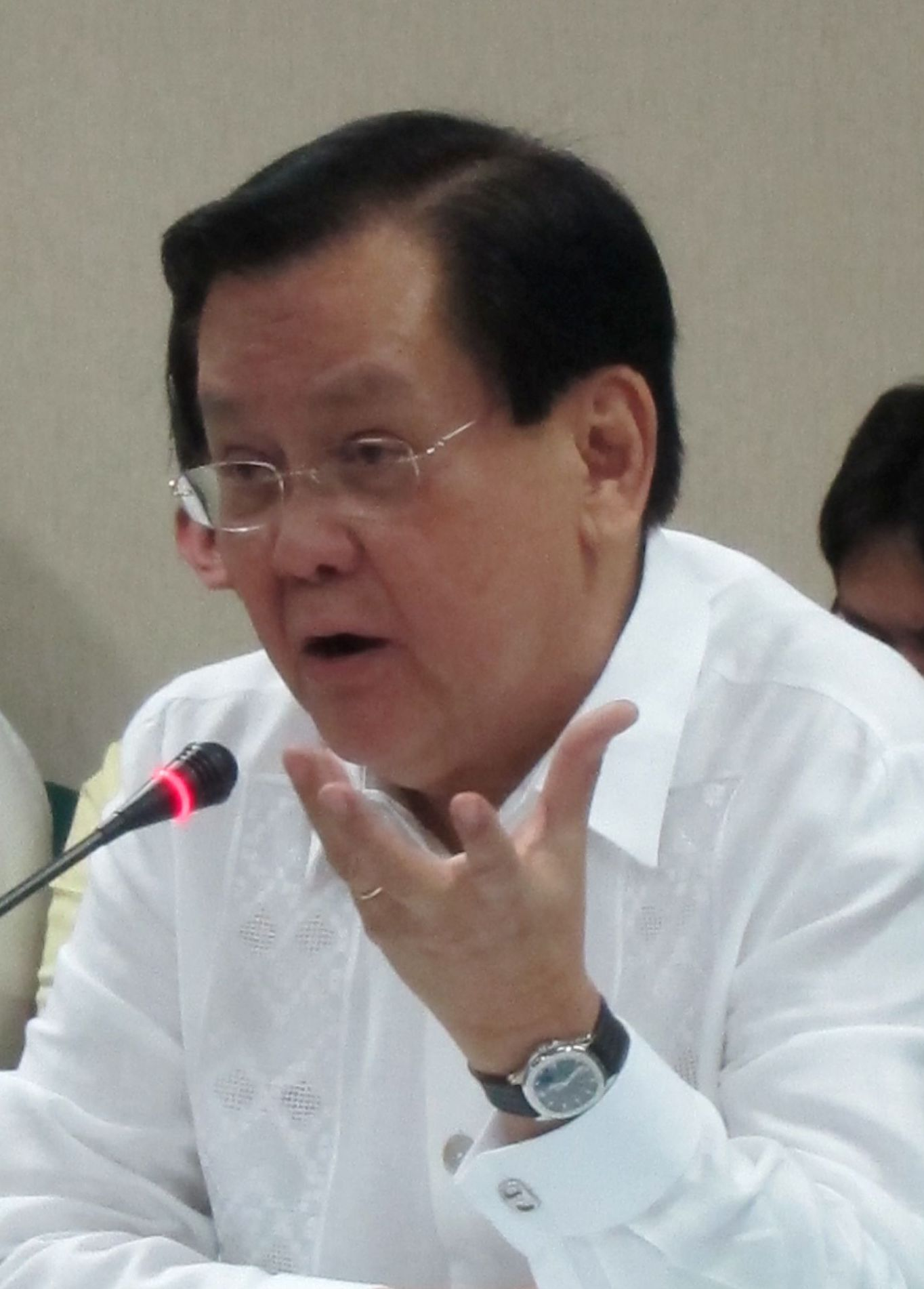
- Sergio Osmeña III leading a budget hearing of the Senate of the Philippines in October 2013

Senator of the Philippines
- In office June 30, 2010 – June 30, 2016
- In office June 30, 1995 – June 30, 2007

Chair of the Senate Banks, Financial Institutions and Currencies Committee
- In office July 26, 2010 – June 30, 2016
- Preceded by: Francis Escudero
- Succeeded by: Francis Escudero

Chair of the Senate Energy Committee
- In office July 26, 2010 – June 30, 2016
- Preceded by: Gregorio Honasan
- Succeeded by: Win Gatchalian

Personal details
- Born: December 13, 1943 (age 82) Manila, Republic of the Philippines
- Party: Independent (1997–1998; 2009–present)
- Other political affiliations: PDP–Laban (2001–2009); Liberal (1998–2001); Lakas (1992–1997); NUCD (until 1992)
- Relations: Maria Angela Barretto (m. 1966; div. 1985) Bettina Mejia Lopez
- Children: 6
- Education: University of San Carlos; University of the Philippines Los Baños; Harvard University; Georgetown University
- Occupation: Politician

Sergio "Serge" de la Rama Osmeña III (Tagalog pronunciation: [ˈsɛɾdʒ ʔosˈmɛɲa]; born December 13, 1943) is a Filipino politician and legislator who served as a Senator of the Philippines. He is a grandson of the 4th president of the Philippines, Sergio Osmeña. In his eighteen years in the Senate, Osmeña chaired the most committees and filed the most bills in the history of the institution.

== Early life ==
Osmeña was born in Manila to Sergio "Serging" Osmeña Jr. of Cebu and Lourdes de la Rama of Negros Occidental. He finished his elementary studies at De La Salle College in Manila.

He spent his secondary studies at the St. Clement's College in Iloilo City, Ateneo de Manila and Beaumont College in Berkshire, England. Although he has never obtained a university degree, he studied in various educational institutions which include University of San Carlos, University of the Philippines, Los Baños, Harvard University, and Georgetown University.

Prior to Ferdinand Marcos' declaration of martial law in the Philippines, Osmeña held business positions including:

- Assistant to president, Essel Incorporated (1967 to 1972)
- Assistant to president, Cebu Autobus Company (1967 to 1972)
- Assistant to president, De La Rama Steamship Co., Inc. (1966 to 1972)
- General Manager, LRO (Lourdes de la Rama Osmeña) Farms / Hacienda Doña Pepang (1968 to 1972)
- Chairman, Cebu Contracting Company (1968 to 1972)

As a son of Marcos' political rival, Osmeña was imprisoned in 1972. In November 1974, he embarked on a hunger strike along with his cellmate, Eugenio "Geny" Lopez, Jr., to protest the unjust detention of thousands of innocent Filipinos. This resulted in the release of 1,022 political prisoners in December 1974. Osmeña and Lopez escaped from their maximum security prison cell in Fort Bonifacio on September 30, 1977. This exploit was enacted in the 1995 movie, Eskapo.

While in exile at the United States, Osmeña served as the Director for Movement for a Free Philippines. He was also the founding director of the Justice for Aquino Justice for All (JAJA) Movement.

After the removal of Marcos in 1986, Osmeña returned to the Philippines and held positions in business and government corporations in the 1990s:

- Director, Pacific CATV, Incorporated (1994 to 1995)
- Director, Telecommunications Holdings Corporation (1994 to 1995)
- Chairman, Intervest Group (1994 to 1995)
- Director, Micrologic Systems, Inc. (1994 to 1995)
- Director, Philippine National Bank (1992 to 1995)
- Director, San Miguel Corporation (1993 to 1995)

== Political career ==
He served as Secretary General of the Progressive Party cluster NUCD–UMDP from 1991 to 1992. When it merged with Lakas in 1992, he served as the member of the National Directorate. In 1992, Osmena ran for Congressman in Cebu's Sixth District but lost.

In 1995, Osmeña was invited by President Fidel Ramos to join in the senatorial race under the Lakas–Laban ticket. He won in the elections and served his term as senator from 1995 to 2001. During that term he was asked to look for a new site of the Senate after the old Executive Building will be renovated for the National Museum. The Senate offices and session hall were transferred to the GSIS Building at the Financial Center in Pasay.

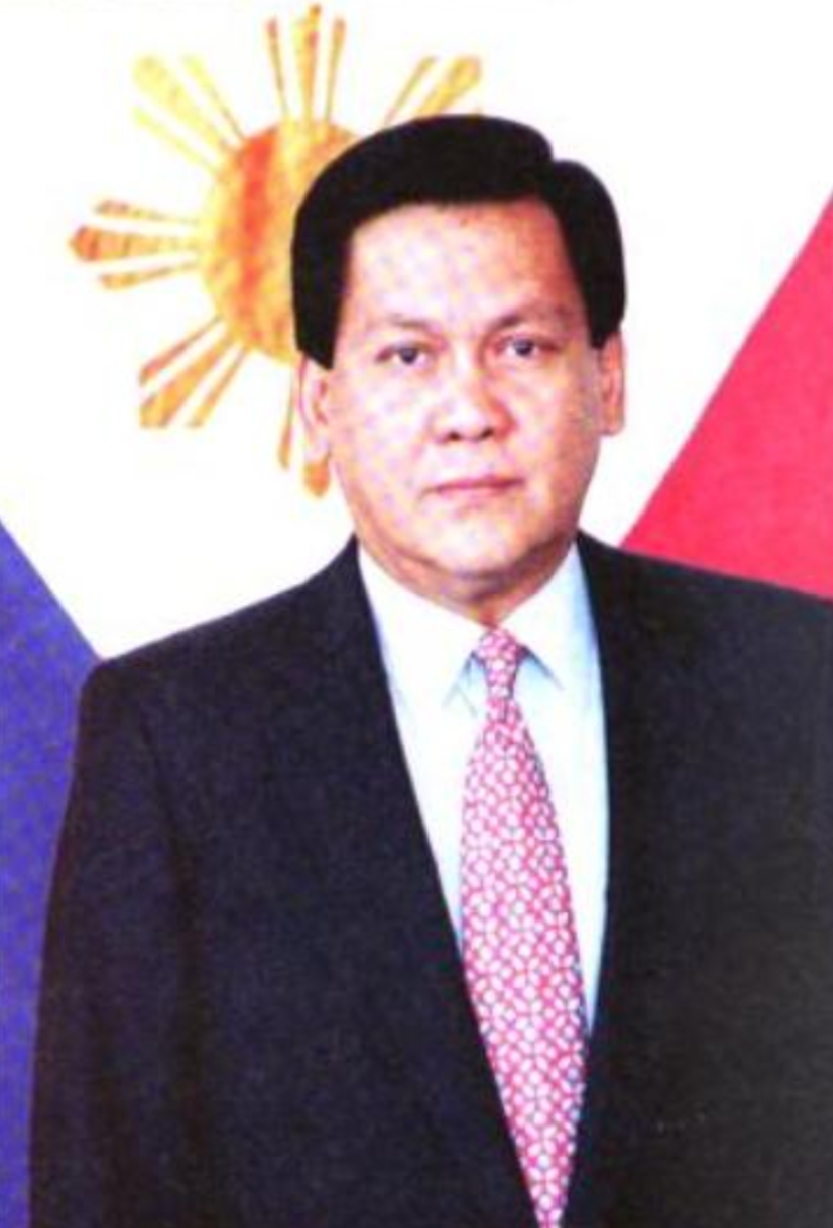
Senator Sergio "Serge" Osmeña In 1997

In 1997, Osmeña bolted Lakas NUCD to be an independent senator. In 1998, he joined the Liberal Party. Osmeña succeeded Senator Edgardo J. Angara as Chair of the powerful Committee on Agriculture and Food and the Congressional Oversight Committee on Agricultural and Fisheries Modernization (COCAFM).

As Chair, Osmeña tried to block the approval of the construction of the Casecnan and the San Roque dams having discovered gross discrepancies in the costs and benefits of the projects. It was Osmeña who pointed out that the government would be investing a ridiculous amount of more than ₱385,000 to irrigate an additional hectare of rice paddy. The expose led to the cancellation of the proposed Balog-Balog irrigation project.

In 2001, Osmeña was one of the senators who voted in favor of opening the second bank envelope for the impeachment case filed against Joseph Estrada. The motion was outnumbered, and it led to the second EDSA People Power Revolution. He ran as independent for the position of Senator under the People Power Coalition. He won in the elections and served his second term as senator from 2001 to 2007.

Right after Senator Aquilino Pimentel Jr. was replaced by Senator Franklin Drilon as Senate President, he joined Pimentel's party PDP–Laban. His mandate as senator for the second term expired in 2007.

Running independent again in 2010 (although adopted by the Liberal Party and the Partido ng Masang Pilipino), Osmeña refused to participate in the sorties of his adoptive parties and opted instead to campaign all by himself. He graced radio programs and television interviews.

Running on a shoe-string budget, Osmeña did not have the volume of posters and billboards of his opponents. He had television advertisements that to him would be more effective and more prudent to reach the electorate. Osmeña placed tenth and became a senator again for the third time.

He ran again in 2016 & 2019 as an independent but failed to make a Senate comeback losing in both elections.

On April 4, 2025, the Commission on Elections (COMELEC) upheld the perpetual disqualification of Osmeña from holding public office for failing to submit his Statement of Campaign Expenses (SOCE) for his 2010 and 2016 senatorial campaigns.

== Personal life ==
Osmeña is married to Bettina Lopez (daughter of former Congressman Alberto Lopez of Iloilo and Chona Mejia Lopez). He has six children.

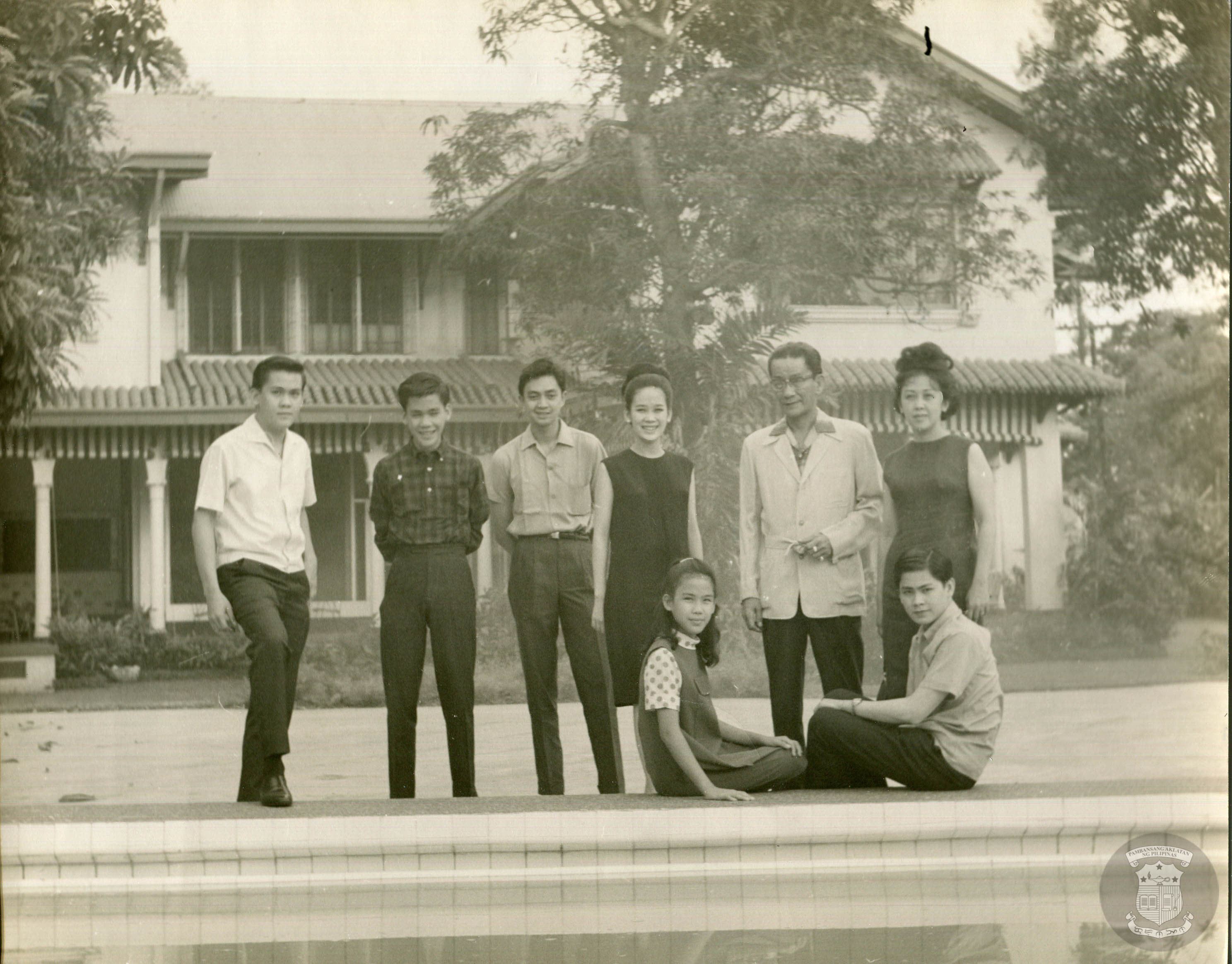
Osmeña Jr. family photo with Serge

Serge Osmeña came from a family of senators. His grandfather Sergio Sr. served during the American colonial period. His father Sergio Jr. served in the 1960s. His cousin, John Henry "Sonny" Osmeña served in the Senate from 1971 to 1972, 1987–1992, 1992–1995 and 1998–2004. His maternal grandfather, Esteban de la Rama of Negros Occidental was also a senator.

His nephew, John Gregory, served as Provincial Vice Governor of Cebu and his younger brother Tomas is the Congressman of Cebu City's south district. Tommy was a close ally of President Gloria Macapagal Arroyo.

He was bestowed Doctor of Laws – Honoris Causa by the Benguet State University in 2000.

He is the chairman of the Aquaworld Corporation, which he held since 1992. While serving his initial term as senator he held a concurrent position as board director of San Miguel Brewery (HK), Ltd.

He was a member of the Philippine Jaycees, where he served as a senator in 1994. He founded Pundok Sugbuanon while he lived in Los Angeles from 1990 to 1992. He is one of the Directors of the ABS-CBN Bayan Microfinance Foundation, held since 1999, and the Lorenzo Tañada Foundation, held since 1998.

== Other ==
Serge Osmeña is a farmer and businessman by training and was educated at Harvard, Georgetown, and the University of the Philippines.

Raised a Visayan, Osmeña speaks Cebuano and Hiligaynon as mother languages although his first language is Tagalog.

== In popular culture ==
Osmeña was portrayed by Richard Gomez in the 1995 film Eskapo.

== Electoral history ==
Electoral history of Serge Osmeña
| Year | Office | Party | Votes received | | | | Result |
| Year | Office | Party | Total | % | P. | Swing | Result |
|---|---|---|---|---|---|---|---|
| 1995 | Senator of the Philippines | Lakas–NUCD | 9,390,935 | 36.49% | 7th | —N/a | Won |
| 2001 | Senator of the Philippines | PDP–Laban | 11,593,389 | 39.33% | 3rd | +2.84 | Won |
| 2010 | Senator of the Philippines | Independent | 11,656,668 | 30.56% | 10th | -8.77 | Won |
| 2016 | Senator of the Philippines | Independent | 12,670,615 | 28.17% | 14th | -2.39 | Lost |
| 2019 | Senator of the Philippines | Independent | 9,455,202 | 19.99% | 17th | -8.18 | Lost |
| 1998 | Vice President of the Philippines | Liberal | 2,351,462 | 9.20% | 4th | —N/a | Lost |

Party political offices
| Vacant Title last held by Eva Estrada Kalaw | Liberal Party nominee for Vice President of the Philippines; 1998 | Vacant Title next held by Mar Roxas |
Senate of the Philippines
| Preceded by Francis Escudero | Chair of the Senate Banks, Financial Institutions and Currencies Committee; 2010–2016 | Succeeded by Francis Escudero |
| Preceded by Gregorio Honasan | Chair of the Senate Energy Committee; 2010–2016 | Succeeded by Win Gatchalian |
