= Irene Santiago =

Filipina peace negotiator and women's advocate

Peace Adviser to the Davao City Mayor
- Mayor: Sara Z. Duterte–Carpio

Personal details
- Party: Aksyon (1998)
- Occupation: Civil worker, government official

Irene Morada Santiago is a peace negotiator from the Philippines. She is Chair Emerita and chief executive officer of the Mindanao Commission on Women (MCW). Santiago has negotiated peace between Muslim separatists and the Philippines government.

She has spent 40 years advocating for the involvement of women in peace processes, serving as peace adviser to the mayor of Davao, executive director of the Mindanao Commission on Women, Inc. and campaign organizer for Women Seriously and Women's Peace Table Worldwide.

In 2020, Santiago was among the 10 finalists announced by the U.S. Institute of Peace (USIP) for the inaugural Women Building Peace Award. She was chosen from among over 150 nominations from 51 countries. She was cited as one of the first women in the world to be both a member of a peace negotiating panel and the chair of the panel implementing a major peace agreement. Her Peace 911 Initiative significantly reduced violent conflict in Paquibato District, Davao City within nine months of being implemented and is now being replicated across the Philippines.

== Biography ==
Santiago studied journalism at Columbia University, graduating in 1963.

Santiago started working in peace negotiation in the 2000s when the Moro Islamic Liberation Front (MILF) wanted to separate from the rest of the Philippines. Santiago saw the crisis as "an opportunity to show that women, even though they are largely noncombatants, could be a vital part of any peace talks." Santiago worked to make sure that women were heavily involved in the process and help create a lasting ceasefire, and also helped to transform MILF into a political party.

In 2001, she was a co-founder of the MCW, which includes women leaders from all faiths in the Philippines, allowing them to influence public policy and opinion.

In 2005, she was one of 1000 women who was nominated for the Nobel Peace Prize.
