= PROMDI =

Devolutionist political party in the Philippines

Progressive Movement for the Devolution of Initiatives
- Abbreviation: PROMDI
- President: Mariano "Mimo" Osmeña
- Founder: Lito Osmeña
- Founded: 1997
- Headquarters: Cebu
- Ideology: Devolution
- National affiliation: PPC (2001); Alyansa ng Pag-asa (2004); MP3 Alliance (2022)
- Senate: 0 / 24
- House of Representatives: 0 / 317

Website
- www.abagpromdi.com

The Progressive Movement for the Devolution of Initiatives or Probinsya Muna Development Initiative (lit. 'Province First Development Initiative'; IPA: [prɔˈbɪnʃa ˈmuna]), abbreviated as PROMDI or Abag-Promdi, is a political party in the Philippines based in Cebu.

The party was founded in 1997 by Lito Osmeña, a former governor of Cebu, for his 1998 presidential campaign. Their main ideology is devolution.

In 2021, PROMDI formed an alliance with Manny Pacquiao's PDP–Laban wing and the People's Champ Movement (PCM), dubbed as the MP3 Alliance. They officially nominated Pacquiao as their candidate in the 2022 Philippine presidential election.

== History ==
PROMDI was founded in 1997 by Lito Osmeña, who served as governor of Cebu (1988–1992) and chief economic adviser to President Fidel V. Ramos (1993–1997), and was Ramos' unsuccessful running mate in the 1992 presidential election. A former officer of Lakas, Osmeña formed PROMDI for his unsuccessful presidential bid in 1998; his running mate was former South Cotabato governor Ismael Sueno. In the House of Representatives, PROMDI won four district seats and a party-list seat represented by Joy Augustus Young.

In 2001, President Joseph Estrada was ousted in the Second EDSA Revolution and Vice President Gloria Macapagal Arroyo ascended to the presidency. PROMDI joined the pro-Arroyo People Power Coalition (PPC) alongside Lakas, Reporma, Aksyon, the Liberal Party, and PDP-Laban. The party won three district seats in the House. However, they were disqualified from the party-list election for failing to meet the criteria of representing the "marginalized and underrepresented" in accordance with the Party-list System Act (R.A. 7941). In Cebu City, PROMDI's Tomas Osmeña was elected mayor and Mike Rama was vice mayor.

The 2004 election was dominated by two major coalitions: the pro-Arroyo K4 and the opposition KNP. However, PROMDI opted to join Aksyon and Reporma (former Arroyo supporters) to form a third smaller coalition, the Alyansa ng Pag-asa (Alliance of Hope). They supported the presidential bid of Aksyon's Raul Roco. In 2010, Osmeña unsuccessfully ran for a Senate seat.

In June 2021, Osmeña announced the revival of PROMDI and their plans to contest the 2022 election at national level. Osmeña died the following month. His son, Mimo, became the new party president. On September 18, PROMDI signed an alliance agreement with the Pacquiao–Pimentel wing of PDP-Laban and the People's Champ Movement (PCM), dubbed the MP3 alliance. On September 26, Senator Manny Pacquiao took his oath as member of PROMDI and was named their honorary chairperson. The party then nominated him as their presidential candidate for 2022. When Pacquiao filed his candidacy on October 1, he declared PROMDI as his party, but asserted that he was not abandoning the leadership dispute of PDP-Laban. Pacquiao's running mate, House Deputy Speaker Lito Atienza of Buhay party-list, also filed his candidacy under PROMDI.

Abag PROMDI will participate in the 2025 House of Representatives elections as a party-list, with Mimo Osmeña as their first nominee.

== Name and symbols ==
Promdi is a Filipino slang referring to people from the provinces or rural areas. It is derived from the accented pronunciation of "from the (province)" and it used to be a derogatory term for Filipinos living outside Metro Manila, who were stereotyped as unsophisticated or socially awkward.

== Political positions ==
In June 2021, PROMDI declared three major platforms: "the devolution of power and initiative, a responsive and relevant educational system, and advanced and tactical nuclearization". The party calls for devolution "to ensure that decisions are made closer to the local people, communities and business they affect". They criticize the unitary system of government based in Imperial Manila as "highly bureaucratic, inefficient, and unresponsive", accusing it of neglecting the provinces. They also want to reform the education system to be "responsive to the needs and wants" of localities. As such, the imposition of national academic standards and assessments should be reviewed. They encourage vocational education and call for the defunding of for-profit education. They also push for the transition to renewable energy. Lastly, they call for the acquisition of nuclear weapons as deterrence, since the Philippines is a "small nation" that must defend itself from "advances by superpowers".

== Organization and structure ==
PROMDI claims to have 3 million members nationwide as of June 2021.

=== Party leadership ===
| Position | Name |
|---|---|
| President | Mariano "Mimo" Osmeña |
| Executive vice president | Chavi Labtic |
| Secretary general | Oscar Canton |
| Deputy secretary general | Neil Labrador |
| Honorary chairperson | Manny Pacquiao (until 2024) |
| Vice president for Luzon | Roy Ilbay |
| Vice president for the Visayas | Fernando Celeste |
| Vice president for Mindanao | Andrade Lagos |
| Treasurer | Caridad Onde |

- As of September 26, 2021 (Osmeña & Pacquiao); June 4, 2021 (other officers)

=== Party presidents ===
- Lito Osmeña (1997–2021)
- Mimo Osmeña (2021–present)

== Electoral performance ==
=== Presidential elections ===
| Election | Candidate | Number of votes | Share of votes | Outcome of election |
|---|---|---|---|---|
| 1998 | Lito Osmeña | 3,347,631 | 12.44% | Lost |
| 2004 | Supported Raul Roco who lost | | | |
| 2010 | N/A | | | |
| 2016 | N/A | | | |
| 2022 | Manny Pacquiao | 3,663,113 | 6.81% | Lost |

=== Vice presidential elections ===
| Election | Candidate | Number of votes | Share of votes | Outcome of election |
|---|---|---|---|---|
| 1998 | Ismael Sueno | 537,677 | 2.10% | Lost |
| 2004 | Supported Herminio Aquino who lost | | | |
| 2010 | N/A | | | |
| 2016 | N/A | | | |
| 2022 | Lito Atienza | 270,381 | 0.52% | Lost |

=== Senate elections ===
| Election | Number of votes | Share of votes | Seats won | Seats after | Outcome of election |
|---|---|---|---|---|---|
| 2010 | 3,980,370 | 1.34% | 0 / 12 | 0 / 24 | Lost |
| 2022 | Candidate rejected by the Commission on Elections (Note: PROMDI fielded one candidate: Roben Parashan. He was not included in the final list of candidates.) | | | | |

=== House of Representatives elections ===
| Election | Districts | | Party-list | | Seats | Outcome |
| Election | Votes | % | Votes | % | Seats | Outcome |
|---|---|---|---|---|---|---|
| 1998 | 586,954 | 2.40% | 255,184 | 2.79% | 5 / 257 | Joined the majority bloc |
| 2001 | | | Disqualified | | 3 / 256 | Joined the majority bloc |
| 2004 | | | N/A | | | Lost |
| 2007 | | | N/A | | | Lost |
| 2010 | Did not participate | | | | | |
| 2013 | Did not participate | | | | | |
| 2016 | Did not participate | | | | | |
| 2019 | Did not participate | | | | | |
| 2022 | 288,049 | 0.60% | N/A | | 0 / 316 | Lost |
| 2025 | | | 23,144 | 0.06% | 0 / 316 | Lost |

== Party-list Representatives to Congress ==
| Period | 1st Representative | 2nd Representative | 3rd Representative |
|---|---|---|---|
| 11th Congress; 1998–2001 | Joy Augustus Young | —N/a | —N/a |

== Bibliography ==
- Teehankee, Julio C. (2002). "Electoral Politics in the Philippines". In Croissant, Aurel; Bruns, Gabriele; John, Marei (eds.). Electoral Politics in Southeast and East Asia (PDF). Singapore: Friedrich Ebert Stiftung. pp. 149–202. ISBN 981-04-6020-1.
- Teehankee, Julio C. (2006). "Consolidation or crisis of clientelistic democracy? The 2004 synchronized elections in the Philippines". In Croissant, Aurel; Martin, Beate (eds.). Between Consolidation and Crisis: Elections and Democracy in Five Nations in Southeast Asia. Berlin: LIT Verlag. pp. 215–276. ISBN 3-8258-8859-2.
