= Partido para sa Demokratikong Reporma =

Political party founded by Renato de Villa

- President: Pantaleon Alvarez
- Chairman: Vacant
- Secretary-General: Clint Aranas
- Founder: Renato de Villa
- Founded: 1997
- Split from: Lakas
- Ideology: Liberal conservatism Economic liberalism
- Political position: Centre to centre-right
- National affiliation: RAGE Coalition (2026–present); DuterTen (2024–2025); TroPa (2021–2022; Alvarez faction); Alyansa ng Pag-asa (2004); PPC (2001)
- Senate: 0 / 24
- House of Representatives: 0 / 317
- Provincial governors: 0 / 82
- Provincial vice governors: 0 / 82

Website
- www.reporma.ph

The Partido para sa Demokratikong Reporma (PDR, lit. 'Party for Democratic Reforms'), commonly known as Partido Reporma, is a political party in the Philippines.

== History ==
=== 1998 elections: de Villa for President ===
It was founded by former Defense Secretary Renato de Villa when he left the ruling Lakas after failing to get the nomination as the party's presidential candidate in the 1998 elections. He chose then Pangasinan governor Oscar Orbos as his running mate. The Lapiang Manggagawa (Workers' Party) forged an electoral alliance with Reporma for the 1998 elections, and the two parties contested in the elections as "Reporma–LM". However, De Villa and Orbos both lost to Joseph Estrada and Gloria Macapagal Arroyo, respectively. The alliance also failed to win seats in the 1998 Philippine Senate election. Haydee Yorac, Roy Señeres, and Rey Langit were among the candidates who failed to win a single seat in the Senate.

=== 2004 Elections: Joining Aksyon's Alyansa ===
In the 2004 elections, Reporma supported the candidacy of former Senator and Education Secretary Raul Roco from Aksyon Demokratiko, in which Reporma forged an electoral alliance with the forementioned party and PROMDI of Cebu under the name "Alyansa ng Pag-asa" (Alliance of Hope).

The party won one out of 235 seats in the House of Representatives of the Philippines in the 2004 Philippine general election. The Lapiang Manggawa contested in the 2010 elections on their own, while Reporma has faded from the political scene.

=== 2020: Party revival ===
In 2020, former speaker Pantaleon Alvarez resigned from the ruling PDP–Laban and accepted de Villa's offer of him becoming secretary-general of the revived Reporma.

=== 2022 elections ===
In the 2022 elections, Reporma initially supported the candidacy of Senator Panfilo Lacson, which initially installed him as the party's chairman, replacing Alvarez. The parties of Partido Reporma, United Nationalist Alliance, and Nationalist People's Coalition are in talks to forge an electoral alliance for the 2022 elections. However, on March 24, 2022, Lacson decided to run as an independent and resigned as a member and chairman of the party. Later that day, Alvarez, the party's president endorsed the candidacy of Vice President Leni Robredo. The following month, some members of Partido Reporma, including those from Aklan and Antique, expressed disappointment with Alvarez's decision as they continued rooting for the Lacson–Sotto tandem. But even though, party founder de Villa still supported Lacson's campaign.

=== 2025 elections ===
On September 20, 2024, Partido Demokratiko Pilipino formally formed an alliance for the 2025 elections with Partido para sa Demokratikong Reporma, Pederalismo ng Dugong Dakilang Samahan and the Mayor Rodrigo Roa Duterte-National Executive Coordinating Committee (MRRD-NECC). Greco Belgica and Pantaleon Alvarez signed the agreement.

=== 2028 elections ===
On February 20, 2026, Reporma endorsed vice president Sara Duterte's bid for the presidency and senator Rodante Marcoleta for vice president and as her potential running mate for the 2028 Philippine presidential election.

== Electoral performance ==
=== Presidential and vice presidential elections ===
Year	Presidential election			Vice presidential election		
Year	Candidate	Vote share	Result	Candidate	Vote share	Result
1998	Renato de Villa	4.86%	Joseph Estrada (PMP)	Oscar Orbos	13.00%	Gloria Macapagal Arroyo (Lakas)
2004	None (Note: supported Raul Roco for president.)		Gloria Macapagal Arroyo (Lakas–CMD)	None (Note: supported Herminio Aquino for vice president.)		Noli de Castro (Independent)
2010	None		Benigno Aquino III (Liberal)	None		Jejomar Binay (PDP–Laban)
2016	None		Rodrigo Duterte (PDP–Laban)	None		Leni Robredo (Liberal)
2022	None (Note: Initially nominated Panfilo Lacson as their standard bearer for the party, later he resigned and left the party as independent (still a Reporma candidate on the COMELEC ballot), Pantaleon Alvarez switched his support and the party to Leni Robredo.)		Bongbong Marcos (PFP)	None (Note: supported Tito Sotto for vice president.)		Sara Duterte (Lakas)

=== Legislative elections ===
Congress of the Philippines
Year	Seats won	Result	Year	Seats won	Ticket	Result
1998	4 / 258	Lakas plurality	1998	0 / 12	Single party ticket	LAMMP win 7/12 seats
2001	3 / 256	Lakas plurality	2001	0 / 13	People Power Coalition	People Power Coalition win 8/13 seats
2004	1 / 261	Lakas plurality	2004	0 / 12	Alyansa ng Pag-asa	K4 win 7/12 seats
2007	Not participating	Lakas plurality	2007	Not participating		Genuine Opposition win 8/12 seats
2010	Not participating	Lakas plurality	2010	Not participating		Liberal win 4/12 seats
2013	Not participating	Liberal plurality	2013	Not participating		Team PNoy win 9/12 seats
2016	Not participating	Liberal plurality	2016	Not participating		Daang Matuwid win 7/12 seats
2019	Not participating	PDP–Laban plurality	2019	Not participating		Hugpong win 9/12 seats
2022	2 / 316	PDP–Laban plurality	2022	0 / 12	Single party ticket	UniTeam won 6/12 seats
2025	0 / 317	Lakas plurality	2025	Not participating		Bagong Pilipinas win 6/12 seats
