= List of libraries in Metro Manila =

The following is a list of libraries in Metro Manila, Philippines.

== Major Public Libraries ==
Name	Location	Collection	External link
National Library of the Philippines; Pambansang Aklatan ng Pilipinas; Biblioteca Nacional de Filipinas	Rizal Park, Kalaw Avenue, Ermita, Manila	1,678,950 items / 291,672 volumes (2008). Collected books, journals, newspapers, magazines, sound and music recordings, databases, maps, atlases, microforms, stamps, prints, drawings, manuscripts	1
Manila City Library	Mehan Garden (near Central Colleges of Manila), Ermita, Manila	17,500 books	3
Marikina City Public Library	West Grandstand, Marikina Sports Park, Shoe Avenue, Santa Elena, Marikina	20,000 books	4
Pasig City Library and Science Discovery Centrum	Caruncho Avenue, San Nicolas, Pasig	40,000 books	5
Quezon City Main Public Library	City Hall Compound, Mayaman Street, Diliman, Quezon City	18,000 books	6
Valenzuela City Library Hub	G. Lazaro Street, Dalandanan, Valenzuela		7
Valenzuela City Academic Center for Excellence – Malinta	Malinta, Valenzuela	16,000 book titles	

== Privately owned libraries ==
Name	Location	Collection	External link
Filipinas Heritage Library	Makati Avenue, Ayala Triangle, Bel-Air, Makati	2,000 volumes of books, 12,000 volumes of monographs, 35,000 photographs, 1,000 volumes of rare and contemporary periodical publications	1
Jose P. Laurel Library and Museum	Roxas Boulevard corner Pedro Gil Street, Ermita, Manila	Jose P. Laurel memorabilia and archives	2
López Museum and Library	Exchange Road corner Meralco Avenue, Ortigas Center, San Antonio, Pasig	19,000 Filipiniana books	3
Ortigas Foundation Inc. Library	Ortigas Avenue corner Meralco Avenue, Ortigas Center, Pasig	16,000 books, periodicals, graduate theses, manuscripts, photographs, maps and loose documents relating to Philippine history	4
Korean Cultural Center in the Philippines (KCC) Library	Bayani Road, Fort Bonifacio, Taguig	About 3,000 titles which include collection of printed materials (e.g. books, journals, magazines, etc.) and multimedia materials (e.g. K-pop CDs and K-movies and drama DVDs spanning the areas of social sciences, history, literature, language, culture and the arts of Korea)	5

== Community Libraries, Branch Libraries, and Barangay Reading Centers ==
Name	Location	External link
Arsenio H. Lacson Public Library	Calderon corner Isabel Streets, Plaza Hugo, Santa Ana, Manila	1
Bacood Public Library	825 Biyaya Street, Bacood, Santa Mesa, Manila	1
Bagong Pag-asa Public Library	Road 9, Bagong Pag-asa, Quezon City	2
Bagumbayan Public Library	Bagumbayan, Quezon City	2
Balingasa Public Library	Crisologo Building, Balingasa, Quezon City	2
Batasan Hills Public Library	Arba corner Muñoz Streets, Sitio Talanay B, Batasan Hills, Quezon City	2
Caloocan City Library	10th Avenue, Caloocan	4
Cubao Public Library	Lion's International Building, Kamuning, Quezon City	2
Escopa Public Library	Barangays Escopa 2 and 3, Quezon City	2
Galas Public Library	Hall, San Isidro-Galas, Quezon City	2
Greater Project 4 Public Library	P. Tuazon Avenue, Marilag, Quezon City	2
Horseshoe Public Library	Sunset Drive, Hall, Horseshoe, Quezon City	2
Kapitan Isidro Mendoza Public Library	Teodoro San Luis corner Central Streets, Pandacan, Manila	1
Kapitolyo Public Library	Kapitolyo Hall, Santa Isabel Street, Kapitolyo, Pasig	
Krus na Ligas Public Library	Daza Hall, Krus na Ligas, Quezon City	2
Lagro Public Library	Greater Lagro Plaza, Pasong Putik, Quezon City	2
Las Piñas City Library	P. Diego Cera Avenue, Daniel Fajardo, Las Piñas	5
Makati City Library	Makati City Hall Building, Jose P. Rizal Avenue, Poblacion, Makati	6
Malabon City Library	Justice Compound, Catmon, Malabon	7
Manila Sacramento Friendship Library	Canonigo corner Zamora Streets, Paco, Manila	1
Manila San Francisco Friendship Library	1559 Alvarez Street, Santa Cruz, Manila	1
Muntinlupa City Library	Contessa Building, Poblacion, Muntinlupa	8
Navotas City Library	M. Naval Street, Sipac-Almacen, Navotas	9
Novaliches Public Library	SB Library Building, Quirino Highway, Novaliches, Quezon City	2
Pag-asa Community Library	Pag-asa Street, Zapanta, Singalong, Malate, Manila City	13
Pansol Public Library	Plaza Street, Pansol, Quezon City	2
Parañaque City Library	E. Quirino Avenue, La Huerta, Parañaque	10
Pasay City Library	Pasay City Hall Building, Harrison Avenue, 70, Pasay	3
Pasong Tamo Public Library	Diego Silang Street, Pasong Tamo, Quezon City	2
Patricia Complex Public Library	Flora corner Benita Streets, Gagalangin, Tondo, Manila	1
Payatas Public Library	Lupang Pangako Street and Bulacan Street, Payatas, Quezon City	2
Project 7 Public Library	Bansalangin corner Palomaria Streets, Veterans Village, Quezon City	2
Project 8 Public Library	Road 15 corner Road 19, Bahay Toro, Quezon City	2
Roxas Public Library	Jasmin Street, Roxas, Quezon City	2
San Juan City Library	Pinaglabanan Shrine, Corazon de Jesus, San Juan	11
San Nicolas Public Library	Madrid corner San Fernando Streets, San Nicolas, Manila	1
Taguig City Library	General Antonio Luna Street, Tuktukan, Taguig	12
Talipapa Public Library	Quirino Highway, Talipapa, Quezon City	2
Tondo Public Library	J. Nolasco corner N. Zamora Streets, Tondo, Manila	1
Valeriano E. Fugoso Library	Lacson Avenue corner Aragon Street, Santa Cruz, Manila	1

== Academic libraries ==
Name	Location	External link
Ateneo de Manila University; Rizal Library	Katipunan Avenue, Loyola Heights, Quezon City	1
Ateneo de Manila University; Ateneo Professional Schools Library	Rockwell Drive, Rockwell Center, Makati	
De La Salle University Manila; Library	Taft Avenue, Malate, Manila	2
Far Eastern University; Library	Nicanor Reyes Sr. Street, Sampaloc, Manila	3
Instituto Cervantes de Manila; Biblioteca Miguel Hernández	Unit D G/F, Tower One & Exchange Plaza, Ayala Triangle, Ayala Avenue, Makati	4
Polytechnic University of the Philippines; Ninoy Aquino Library and Learning Resources Center	Anonas Street, Santa Mesa, Manila	
University of the Philippines Diliman; Main Library	Roxas Avenue, Diliman, Quezon City	5
University of Santo Tomas; Miguel de Benavides Library	España Boulevard, Sampaloc, Manila	6

== See also ==
- List of libraries in the Philippines
