= Libraries in the Philippines =

Libraries in the Philippines, similar to libraries in other countries, come in one of the four basic types: academic, school, public, and special libraries. Prominent libraries are the National Library of the Philippines and academic libraries.

== National Library of the Philippines ==
The National Library of the Philippines (Filipino: Pambansang Aklatan ng Pilipinas or Aklatang Pambansa ng Pilipinas, abbreviated NLP) is located in Manila. It is the official repository of information on cultural heritage and other literary resources.

== Academic libraries ==
Many education institutions have an attached library:

- Ateneo de Manila University
- Central Philippine University
- De La Salle University
- Far Eastern University
- International Rice Research Institute in Los Baños, Laguna
- Manuel S. Enverga University Foundation in Lucena City, Quezon Province
- Polytechnic University of the Philippines
- Silliman University
- University of San Carlos
- University of Santo Tomas
- University of the East
- University of the Philippines

== Other libraries ==
Some museums in the Philippines have their own libraries, for example the Lopez Museum.

== Volumes ==
About 1.2 million volumes of reference and reading materials are available at the National Library, in which the Filipiniana and Asia Division alone own more than 100,000 Filipiniana books. The Diliman portion of the library of the University of the Philippines is composed of 1,132,483 volumes. The University of Santo Tomas Miguel de Benavides Library contains 822,000 books. The Central Philippine University Library has 250,000+ volumes. The University of the East Library has 177,900 books. 160,000 volumes are deposited at the International Rice Research Institute.

== See also ==
- List of libraries in Metro Manila
- Copyright law of the Philippines
- Library associations in the Philippines
- Mass media in the Philippines
