= MNHS =

MNHS may refer to:

- Minnesota Historical Society

== Schools ==
- Malinta National High School, Valenzuela City, Philippines
- Marple Newtown High School, Newtown Square, Pennsylvania, United States
- McKinney North High School, McKinney, Texas, United States
- Millard North High School, Omaha, Nebraska, United States
- Muntinlupa National High School, Muntinlupa City, Philippines
- Monacan High School, Chesterfield, Virginia
