= Malinta National High School =

Public high school in Valenzuela, Philippines

Location
- St. Jude Subdivision (Senior High School Campus) and A. Pablo Street (Junior High School Campus), Malinta, Valenzuela City (Philippines) Valenzuela City; Philippines
- Coordinates: 14°41′30″N 120°58′01″E

Information
- Motto: "No Sacrifice, No Victory" ("Walang Sakripisyo, Walang Tagumpay")
- Established: 1969 (Malinta Barrio High School) 1970 (Valenzuela Municipal High School - Malinta Annex) 1997 (Independence) 1998 (Malinta National High School
- Status: Public
- School district: Division of City Schools - Valenzuela
- Principal: Mr. Edwin L. Valera
- Grades: 7 to 12
- Enrollment: Approx. 50:1
- Colors: Green and White , Blue (2025)
- Nickname: MNHS, Malinta Nat, Malinta NHS
- Affiliations: Division of City Schools–Valenzuela, Department of Education

Malinta National High School (''transl: Mataas na Paaralang Pambansa ng Malinta) is a school established in 1997 in Valenzuela City. The Junior High School branch is located at A. Pablo Street along with Malinta Elementary School, ValMaSci and ValACE Center Malinta.

== History ==
Malinta National High School started in 1969 as Malinta Barrio High School and was initially located within Malinta Elementary School. It gained independence in 1997 and became Malinta National High School through a law passed in 1998. It is a 47-year old nationally funded institution of learning situated in Brgy. Malinta, Valenzuela City. Established in 1969, the school started as the Malinta Barrio High School by virtue of Valenzuela Municipal Council Resolution No. 72 and was initially located inside the campus of Malinta Elementary School. A year after, the school was integrated into Valenzuela Municipal High School as Malinta Annex. On 28 July 1997, the school gained its independent status and on 23 July 1998 by virtue of Republic Act 8722, it became Malinta National High School. In 2016, the Senior High School program became part of the circular offerings of the school. Malinta National High School is one of the first four public secondary schools in Valenzuela City with Senior High School programs. At present, the school has 2 campuses. The Senior High School branch on St. Jude (hence its alternate name St. Jude campus) And along with 3 other learning centers, the Junior High School branch on A. Pablo Street.

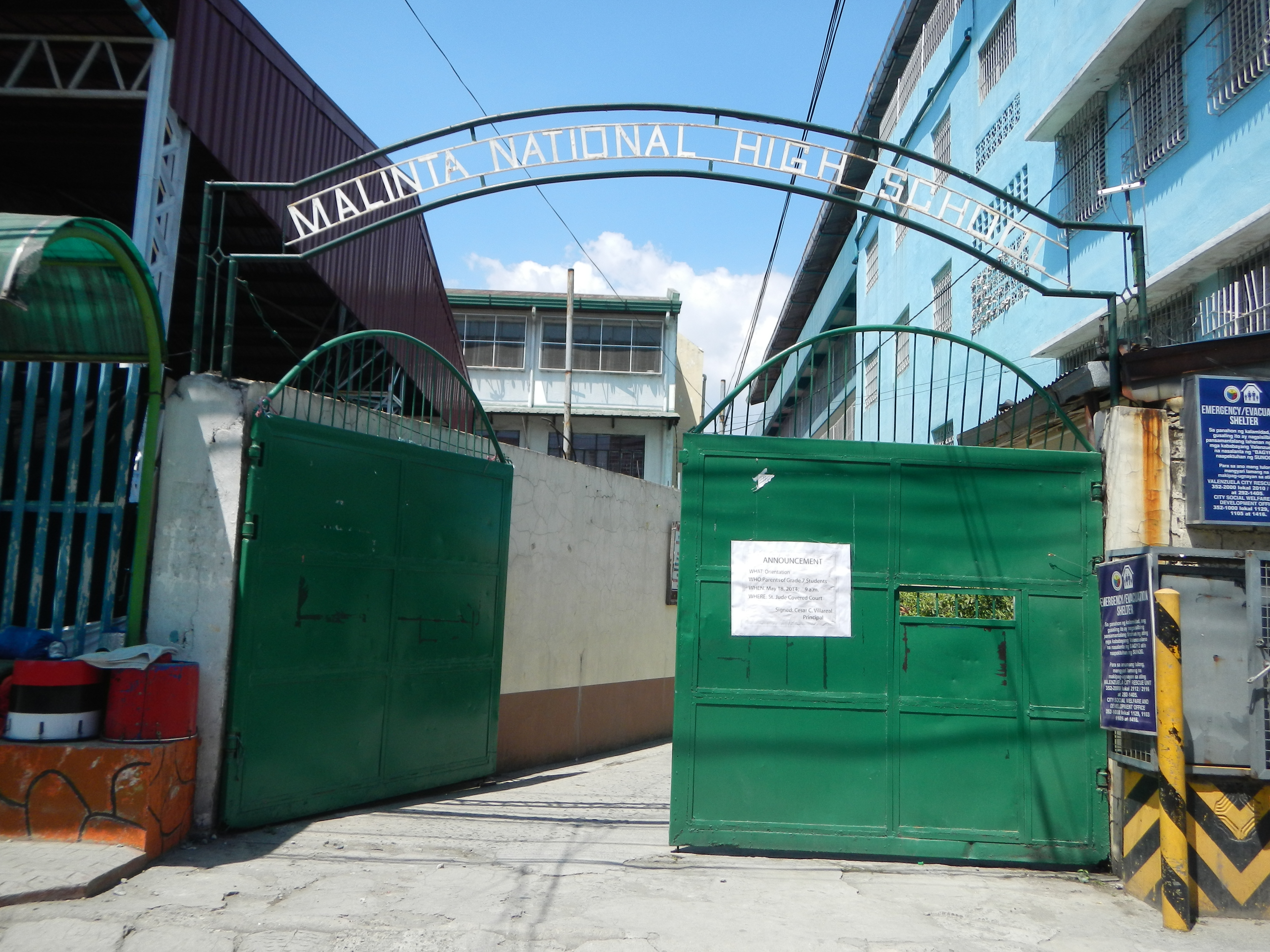
Welcome arch
