= University of San Carlos Museum =

University museum in Cebu City, Philippines

- Established: 1950s
- Location: University of San Carlos Downtown Campus, Cebu City, Philippines
- Coordinates: 10°18′01″N 123°53′54″E
- Type: History museum
- Collection size: 9,606 (1988)
- Owner: University of San Carlos
- Website: museum.usc.edu.ph

The University of San Carlos Museum is the history museum of the University of San Carlos (USC), located in Cebu City, in the Philippines.

== History ==
The University of San Carlos Museum has been operating as early as 1952 but it was only on April 23, 1967, that inauguration rites for the museum were conducted. They were graced by a Verbite priest and University of San Carlos President, Rudolf Rahmann and First Lady Imelda Marcos. In 1967, the museum occupied just two classrooms and another room. By 2017, it was occupying the ground floor wings of the Arthur Dingman Building along P. Del Rosario Street at USC's Downtown Campus

== Collection ==
According to an inventory made in 1988 by the USC Museum curator at the time, Jane Calderon-Hayhow, the museum's collection comprises 9,606 artifacts, objects and specimens.

== Literature ==
- Lenzi, Iola (2004). Museums of Southeast Asia. Singapore: Archipelago Press. p. 200 pages. ISBN 981-4068-96-9.
