= President of the University of San Carlos =

Office of the President of the University of San Carlos, Cebu

- Incumbent; Fr. Francisco Antonio T. Estepa, S.V.D. since August 1, 2023
- Style: The Very Reverend
- Appointer: USC Board of Trustees
- Term length: 3 years; No restriction on renewal
- Precursor: Rector
- Formation: 1964
- First holder: Rudolph Rahmann

The President of the University of San Carlos is the head administrator and chief academic officer of the University of San Carlos, elected by the University's ten-member Board of Trustees. As the CEO, the president appoints other officials including the vice presidents, chaplain, deans, registrar, principals, etc. Presidents generally serve three-year terms, and are qualified for re-election indefinitely.

The current president of the University of San Carlos is Fr. Francisco Antonio T. Estepa, SVD, who was formally installed on September 15, 2023.

== History ==
=== Secular Rectors of the Real Seminario de San Carlos (1825–1867) ===
The Office of the President of the University of San Carlos traces in roots in the office of the Rector of the Real Seminario de San Carlos, which was founded in 1783 by Bishop Mateo Joaquin Rubio de Arevalo of the Diocese of Cebu. Despite the founding of the Seminary in 1783, there were no permanent faculty members during the first few years of its operation, as hardly anyone was trained for seminary administration and theological teaching. In 1825, the Seminary's first rector, Fr. José Morales del Rosario, was appointed by Bishop Francisco Genoves, and was followed by a series of secular rectors until 1867.

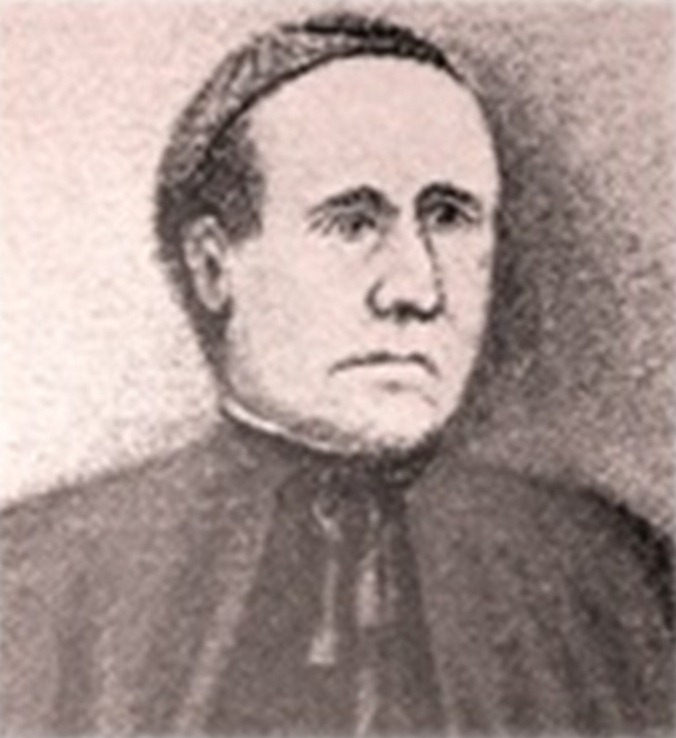
Fr. José Casarramona, CM. Rector, 1867-1870

=== Vincentian Rectors (1867–1935) ===
On 19 October 1852, Isabella II of Spain created the Congregation of the Mission to administer the Conciliar Seminaries in the Philippines. With this, Bishop Romualdo Jimeno of Cebu invited the Padres Paules (Vincentians) to take over the Seminary in 1863. In 1867, the Seminary, which was previously renamed as the Seminario Conciliar de San Carlos, was formally turned over to Fr. José Casarramona, CM., who became the rector. On May 15, 1867, under the rectorate of Fr. Casarramona, the Seminary allowed laymen to study as externs (colegiales), marking the beginning of the Seminario-Colegio which later became the University of San Carlos.

Under the Vincentian rectorship, the Seminary and College were made into separate institutions in response to Pope Pius XI's apostolic letter Officiorum omnium, which decreed that "seminaries should serve no other purpose than that for which they were founded." Fr. H. Garcia was appointed as the Colegio's first Rector.

=== SVD Rectors and Presidents (1935 - present) ===
In 1935, the Society of the Divine Word (SVD) took over the Colegio de San Carlos. The first SVD rector was Fr. Arthur F. Dingman, who is the namesake of the main building of the University's Downtown Campus, located along P. del Rosario Street. The Colegio was elevated to university status in 1948, during Fr. Dingman's second term.

In 1964, the rectorate was re-established as the Office of the University President, with Fr. Rudolph Rahmann, SVD being the president. In 1970, Fr. Rahmann was succeeded by Fr. Amante Castillo, SVD, the University's first Filipino president. Following Fr. Castillo, Fr. Margarito Alingasa, SVD oversaw the filipinization of the University of San Carlos, in response to Presidential Decree No. 176. As of 2024, every president since Fr. Castillo's presidency has been Filipino.

The longest consecutively serving president has been Fr. Dionisio M. Miranda, SVD (2008–2020), who was conferred with the title of President Emeritus in 2023.

== List of Rectors and Presidents ==
There is a dispute regarding the founding date of the University of San Carlos, and the origin of the office of the University President. The superiors of the Jesuit Colegio de San Ildefonso are not listed here.

Seminary Rectors
Order	Years in Office	Name
1	1825 - 1844	Fr. José Morales del Rosario
2	1844	Fr. Miguel Nicolas Carmelo
3	1844 - 1853	Fr. Esteban Meneses
4	1853 - 1867	Fr. Bernardo Yubal

Seminary-College Rectors
Order	Years in Office	Name
5	1867 - 1870	Fr. José Casarramona, C.M.
6	1870 - 1880	Fr. Antonio Farré, C.M.
7	1880 - 1889	Fr. Francisco Jarrero, C.M.
8	1889 - 1908	Fr. Pedro Juliá, C.M.
9	1908 - 1911	Fr. Jacinto Villalain, C.M.
10	1911 - 1922	Fr. Pedro Angulo, C.M.
11	1922-1923	Fr. Narciso Vila, C.M.
12	1923-1929	Fr. Lope Legido, C.M.
13	1929-1931	Fr. Francisco Gonzalez, C.M.

College and University Rectors
Order	Years in Office	Name
14	1931 - 1933	Fr. Honorio Garcia, C.M.
15	1933 - 1934	Fr. José Garcia, C.M.
16	1934 - 1936	Fr. Maximo Juguera, C.M.
17	1936 - 1939	Fr. Arthur F. Dingman, S.V.D.
18	1939 - 1942	Fr. Enrique Ederle, S.V.D.
19	1945 - 1947	Fr. Arthur F. Dingman, S.V.D.
20	1947 - 1949 (acting)	Fr. Lawrence W. Bunzel, S.V.D.
21	1949 - 1956	Fr. Albert van Gansewinkel, S.V.D.
22	1956 - 1960	Fr. Herman Kondring, S.V.D.
23	1960 - 1964	Fr. Harold Rigney, S.V.D.
24	1964 - 1970	Fr. Rudolf Rahmann, S.V.D.

University Presidents
Order	Years in Office	Name
24	1964 - 1970	Fr. Rudolf Rahmann, S.V.D.
25	1970 - 1975	Fr. Amante Castillo, S.V.D.
26	1975 - 1979	Fr. Margarito Alingasa, S.V.D.
27	1979 - 1982	Fr. Gregorio Pizarro, S.V.D.
28	1982 - 1987	Fr. Florante Camacho, S.V.D.
29	1987 - 1993	Fr. Roderick Salazar, Jr., S.V.D.
30	1993 - 1999	Fr. Ernesto Lagura, S.V.D.
31	1999 - 2002	Fr. Francisco Antonio T. Estepa, S.V.D.
32	2002 - 2008	Fr. Roderick Salazar, Jr., S.V.D.
33	2008 - 2020	Fr. Dionisio Miranda, S.V.D.
34	2020 - 2023	Fr. Narciso Cellan, Jr., S.V.D.
35	2023 - present	Fr. Francisco Antonio T. Estepa, S.V.D.
