= Valenzuela City School of Mathematics and Science =

- Paaralang Pang-matematika at Pang-agham ng Lungsod ng Valenzuela (Filipino)

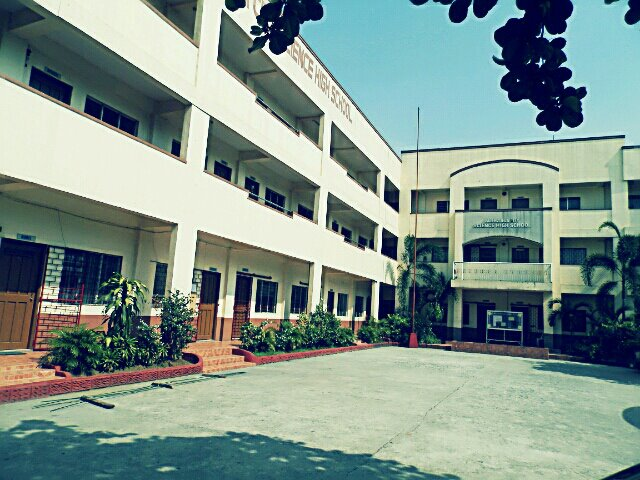
- The school campus in 2011

Location
- A. Pablo Street, Malinta; Valenzuela City, Metro Manila; Philippines; 14°41′31″N 120°58′00″E

Information
- Type: Specialized public high school
- Motto: Pride, Honor, and Glory; Puso at Talino; Husay Valmasci
- Established: 2003 (as Valenzuela City Science High School); 2014 (as Valenzuela City School of Mathematics and Science)
- Principal: Serafin S. Raymundo II
- Staff: 28 (School Year 2024–2025)
- Teaching staff: 51 (School Year 2024–2025)
- Grades: 7 to 12
- Enrollment: 1010 (School Year 2025-2026)
- Language: English, Filipino, Japanese, Spanish
- Colors: Green, maroon, white, and light gray
- Newspaper: The Equilibrium (English); Ang Iskolar (Filipino)
- Affiliations: Division of City Schools–Valenzuela

The Valenzuela City School of Mathematics and Science (Filipino: Paaralang Pang-matematika at Pang-agham ng Lungsod ng Valenzuela), also referred to as VCSMS and ValMaSci, is a specialized public high school in Valenzuela City, Philippines.

Established in 2003 as the Valenzuela City Science High School (Mataas na Paaralang Pang-agham ng Lungsod ng Valenzuela), it offers a special advanced curriculum with emphasis in the fields of mathematics and science to residents of Valenzuela City. The school also has a specialized range of subjects in technology, engineering, and language.

== Admission ==
To be admitted to the Valenzuela City School of Mathematics and Science, the applicant must be a bona fide resident of Valenzuela City; must not have a grade in any subject during his elementary school lower than 85; and must pass the admission exam. Applicants who have obtained at least 85% of the admission test are considered for admission. No students will be allowed to enroll in the next school year unless an average of at least 85% is maintained in all subject areas. According to City Ordinance No. 120, the top two students of each graduating elementary batch of Valenzuela City public schools are exempted from taking the exam and will be automatically admitted to the school, if they choose to accept the offer.

== History ==
The first seal used by Valenzuela City School of Mathematics and Science. This seal was only used during the school year 2014–2015 before changing it to the current seal.

=== Valenzuela City Science High School ===
The Science Oriented Experimental Class (SOEC) was initiated in school year 1996–1997 "to shape and produce globally competitive and morally upright individuals who will serve as the foundation of [the] nation's great success." It was an education program organized by former Valenzuela City Mayor Jose Emmanuel Carlos. The class was housed at the Valenzuela National High School (VNHS), in Barangay Marulas, and it was composed of 40 academically outstanding students.

On May 14, 2003, seven years after SOEC was created, Valenzuela City Ordinance No. 37 s. 2003 was approved, establishing a science high school from the original SOEC. The school, under the name Valenzuela City Science High School, was to be funded by the local School Board of Valenzuela.

On February 8, 2003, a memorandum was sent to all principals of public and private elementary schools in the city, requesting to inform graduating students to apply for the qualifying examination for the upcoming admission of first-year high school students at VCSHS. With 200 applicants administered, 108 students passed the admission tests (consisting of an intelligence quotient test, a proficiency test, and an interview). They enrolled at the new school with Brian E. Ilan as the first principal. On June 9, 2003, the first VCSHS Parents, Teachers, and Community Association (PTCA) was formed.

From the original six teachers, the institution added eight. Additional students made the VCSHS community larger as the years passed. At the beginning of the school year 2005–2006, VCSHS moved to its newly constructed building at A. Marcelo Street in Barangay Dalandanan. City Mayor Sherwin Gatchalian inaugurated the new house, and 4th year students entered VCSHS. According to the teachers at the time, a recorded shortest graduation happened for the 15 students of SOEC passing the 4th year curriculum of ValSci.

=== Valenzuela City School of Mathematics and Science ===
In early 2014, Valenzuela City Mayor Rexlon Gatchalian announced the construction of a new state-of-the-art campus under the name Valenzuela City School of Mathematics and Science. This is a part of the Education 360° Investment Program of the local government that included feeder programs, the provision of school supplies, and training for students, parents, and teachers. Rexlon Gatchalian explained, "This is a large-scale investment to shore up the local education system." Out of the ₱300 million budget allotted to the plan, ₱199 million was spent on the construction and outfit of the new school campus. He said that the soon-to-rise school is the "best education investment [the] city has ever made."

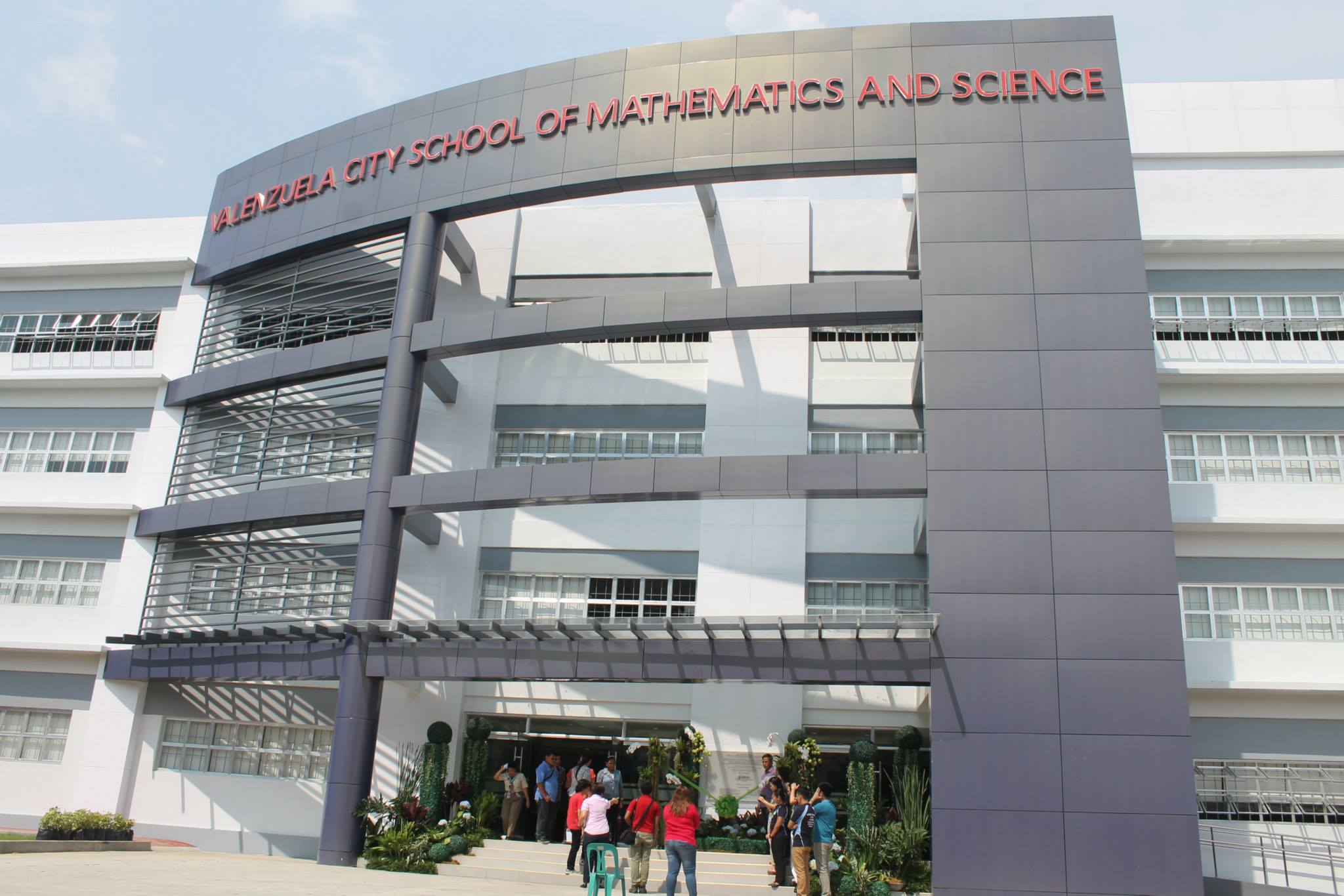
The facade of the Valenzuela City School of Mathematics and Science campus in Barangay Malinta, in August 2014.

The groundbreaking of the new school site in Barangay Malinta was held on January 27, 2014. Rexlon Gatchalian, local government officials, the Valenzuela City Science High School faculty and students, and the Department of Education (DepEd) secretary Armin Luistro attended the ceremony. The mayor praised the school's NAT scores, which are the highest in Metro Manila, and the high passing rate for UPCAT. He said in another interview that "these classrooms will be available for use when classes open in June this year."

The changing of the school name to Valenzuela City School of Mathematics and Science gained much dispute around the school community. Rexlon Gatchalian responded by saying, "The reason is because we do better in math compared to science." DepEd secretary Luistro said, "I'm okay with the name change, but I'm more concerned with the substantial changes in the curriculum, the quantity of its graduates, and how many of them will take math or science-related courses in college." The new name was proposed by city councilor Lorena Natividad-Borja. It was signed by the mayor as City Ordinance No. 120, which includes the enhancement of the mathematics program in the new curriculum.

The campus was completed in August 2014, six months after the groundbreaking ceremony, and was inaugurated on September 1, 2014. Luistro praised the city's education program by stating, "I am very much impressed by this city's investment in education. Aside from this new city school, Valenzuela City has found solutions for the decongestion of schools within their area through the 'busing system,' by transferring students from one school to another." Rexlon Gatchalian, during the tour of the newly constructed building, said, "With something as grand as this, we want to stir an interest in mathematics and science among the youth in Valenzuela City."

The four-story school building is a full Wi-Fi zone and contains 20 classrooms, which can hold 35 to 40 students each, and physics and robotics, speech, computer, chemistry, biology, and mathematics laboratories. Each of the six laboratories is equipped with an interactive Smart Board, while the science (physics and robotics, chemistry, and biology) laboratories have two areas: one for lecture and another for experiments.

Dubbed as the "crown jewel" of the city when it comes to education investments, the Valenzuela City School of Mathematics and Science is said to be envisioned as part of the most high-tech and advanced mathematics and science schools in the Philippines. To keep the building, its facilities, and other tangible concerns proper, the city government assigned personnel to function as building administrators. Classes at the new campus began on September 8, 2014. Luistro said, "My prayer is that Valenzuela City School of Mathematics and Science may produce the best and brightest scientists of the country."

== Student Governance ==
Principals of the Valenzuela City School of Mathematics and Science
Brian E. Ilan, 2003–2006
Lagrimas B. Bayle, 2006–2006
Genindina M. Sumbillo, 2006–2008
Arneil D. Aro, 2008–October 2011
Edelina I. Golloso, October 2011–February 2012
Brian E. Ilan, February 2012–September 16, 2013
Jameson H. Tan, September 16, 2013–March 2016
Christina Cerdeña Salonga, March 2016–July 3, 2018
Jaime S. De Vera Jr., July 3, 2018 – February 28, 2023
Juliana Tamayo Alvarez, February 28, 2023 – March 1, 2023
Jaime S. De Vera Jr., March 1, 2023 – February 13, 2026
Serafin SD Raymundo II, February 13, 2026–Incumbent

=== The VCSMS SSLG ===
The Valenzuela City School of Mathematics and Science Supreme Secondary Learner Government, referred to as the VCSMS SSLG (formerly VCSMS SSG), and commonly referred as the SSLG, is the student government of Valenzuela City School of Mathematics and Science. It is the highest governing body of the school, managed by students. The student government promotes transparency, support to learners, and activities for students to participate in. It has 2 parties competing for 12 spots in the student government, which are DOTA.LE F.L.A.R.E (Disciplined Officers with Tactics Alliance for Leadership & Excellence | Fearless Leaders Advocating for Reforms & Empowerment) and SEGA (Students Engaged in Good Alliance).

=== School Clubs ===
The school accommodates 20 accredited clubs, two of which were founded through DepEd Memorandums and the rest were founded by the school. Early in a school year, the student government conducts the event of “Club Hunting” where after class dismissal, students get a chance to wander around the school atrium, where clubs are stationed to recruit club members. Alongside this, the student government conducts “Club Days” for clubs to station at the atrium to present fun interactive activities for students and club members. The clubs are required to conduct activities and meetings within members and officers to improve camaraderie. The clubs included are the English Club, Reading Society, Basa Valmascino, KALAW (Kapisanan ng Literatura at Wika), KAP (Kapisanan ng Araling Panlipunan), Nihongo Club, ICT Club, Mathematics Club, Robotics Guild, YES-O (Youth for Environment in Schools Organization), Ecosavers, MAPEH Clubs (Sipnayaw Dance Troupe, The Cassette, and Sports Club), BERT (Batang Emergency Response Team), the Values Education Club, PCC (Peer Counseling Club), and BKB (Barkada Kontra Bisyo), plus 2 now-defunct clubs namely the Campus Ministry Club and the Nuclear Science and Technology Club (NSTC). The Equilibrium and Ang Iskolar are student-led organizations for campus journalism in both English and Filipino, respectively.

== Batch Names ==
Around the senior years of a junior high school batch, they are asked to come up with a name to call themselves. The SSLG representative of the batch and class officers of the section within will lead to communicate with the rest of the batch to receive name proposals from which the proponents will debate. The batch name shall reflect the qualities that stand out best from the community within the batch. It is highly recommended that the batch name can be written in baybayin, but other languages such as Latin, English, or others may be accepted. The names of the batches will be printed on a sablay, which is worn for photos for yearbooks and for portrait photo shoot, for both moving up to senior high school and graduation.

Batch Names	Language / Origin	Literal Meaning
Soec	Acronym for Science Oriented Experimental Class	An acronym for the Science Oriented Experimental Class, initiated in SY 1996-1997 by former Mayor Jose Emmanuel Carlos at Valenzuela National High School to shape globally competitive and morally upright individuals.
Optimus	Latin	Best or greatest.
Enigma	Greek / Latin	A person or thing that is mysterious, puzzling, or difficult to understand.
Spectrum	Latin	A band of colors, or a broad range of varied qualities, ideas, or positions.
Elixir	Arabic / Medieval Latin	A magical or medicinal potion, or a substance believed to prolong life indefinitely.
Fleija	Germanic / Norse	A name derived from Freya, the Norse goddess associated with love, beauty, and fertility.
Evince	Latin	To reveal, manifest, or show clearly.
Signum	Latin	A sign, mark, or token.
Zion	Hebrew	A biblical name representing a holy place, kingdom of heaven, or place of peace.
Eximius	Latin	Extraordinary, exceptional, or select.
Nexus	Latin	A connection or central series linking two or more things together.
Xanthron	Greek-derived neologism	A modern constructed term, typically associated with yellow or golden-hued concepts (from the Greek root xanthos).
Silakbo	Filipino	An emotional outburst, surge, or sudden fit of passion.
Matrix	Latin	An environment, structure, or grid in which something develops, originates, or is formed.
Alpas	Filipino	To break free, become loose, or clear away obstacles.
Hiraya	Filipino	The deep illusion, vision, or imagination of one's mind (often used in the phrase Hiraya Manawari, meaning "may your dreams come true.")
Sinagtala	Filipino	Starlight, or the light beam coming from a star
Sandiwa	Filipino	One mind, one spirit, or unified thought (from isang diwa).
Sanghaya	Filipino	Honor, dignity, majesty, or nobility.
Alaya	Kapampangan	Dawn, or the eastern horizon.
Siklab	Filipino	A sudden burst or flame.

== School hymn ==
The official school hymn of the Valenzuela City School of Mathematics and Science, also known as "Himno ValMaSci" or the "VALMASCI Hymn", was written and composed by Cynthia Soledad S. Aspe, with musical arrangement by Virgilio T. Santos Jr.

The hymn is traditionally performed during flag raising ceremonies and other official school events.

=== Lyrics ===
ValMaSci, o aming ValMaSci
Alma mater kong Mahal
Ikaw ang gabay
Sa aming Tagumpay

ValMaSci, o aming ValMaSci
Alma mater kong Mahal
Hinubog ng Talino
Itataas ang iyong sulo

ValMaSci, ako'y nanggaling sa iyo

Paaralang hinirang
Sagisag ng Kahusayan
Paaralang pang Matematika at Agham

Puso at Talino
Taglay ng pagkatuto
Sa pagsagwan
Sa agos ng buhay

Kami'y magbibigay ng karangalan
Sa iyong magandang pangalan
Kami'y patuloy na lalaban
Sa mga hamon ng buhay

ValMaSci, o aming ValMaSci
Alma mater kong Mahal
Ikaw ang gabay
Sa aming Tagumpay

ValMaSci, o aming ValMaSci
Alma Mater kong Mahal
Hinubog ng Talino
Itataas ang iyong sulo

ValMaSci, ako'y nanggaling sa iyo
ValMaSci, ako'y nanggaling sa iyo
