= University of San Carlos =

Catholic university in Cebu City, Philippines

- Pamantasan ng San Carlos (Filipino); Unibersidad sa San Carlos (Cebuano)
- Former names: Seminario-Colegio de San Carlos (1783–1924); Colegio de San Carlos (1924–1948)
- Motto: Scientia, Virtus, Devotio (Latin)
- Motto in English: Knowledge/Excellence, Valor/Integrity, Fidelity/Commitment
- Type: Private, research, non-stock, higher education institution
- Established: 1783 (as Seminario-Colegio de San Carlos); 1924 (as Colegio de San Carlos)
- Founder: Bishop Mateo Joaquin Rubio de Arevalo (Seminario-Colegio de San Carlos)
- Religious affiliation: Catholic (Society of the Divine Word)
- Academic affiliations: PAASCU, Philippine Technological Council - Accreditation and Certification Board for Engineering and Technology (PTC-ACBET), Philippine Council for NGO Certification (PCNC), DOST-Accelerated Science & Technology Human Resource Development Program (ASTHRDP), DOST-Engineering Research and Development for Technology (ERDT), United Nations Development Programme (UNDP) - Phil Dev CHED TechHub, US Embassy Phils. American Corner & Education USA Center
- Chairman: Maria Luz Vilches, PhD
- President: Fr. Francisco Antonio Estepa, SVD, PhD
- Vice-president: Fr. Jesuraj Anthoniappen SVD, PhD (VP for Academic Affairs); Joan Largo, LLM (VP for Administration); Fr. Arthur Villanueva SVD, MA (VP for Finance)
- Faculty: 623 (2024–2025)
- Total staff: 1,040+ (2022–2023)
- Students: 17,187 (2024-2025)
- Undergraduates: 16,146 (2024–2025)
- Postgraduates: 1,041 (2024–2025)
- Location: P. del Rosario St. (Downtown campus) Gov.Manuel Cuenco Ave. (Talamban campus), Cebu City, Cebu, Philippines; 10°17′58″N 123°53′56″E
- Campus: 88 hectares (880,000 m^{2}); 2 Urban campuses
- Newspaper: Today's Carolinian
- Patron Saints: Charles Borromeo, Arnold Janssen, Joseph Freinademetz
- Colors: Green and gold
- Nickname: Warriors
- Sporting affiliations: CESAFI, PRISAA
- Website: www.usc.edu.ph

- Location in the Visayas Location in the Philippines

The University of San Carlos (USC; Filipino: Pamantasan ng San Carlos; Cebuano: Unibersidad sa San Carlos), colloquially referred to as San Carlos or Sangkarlos, is a private, Catholic, and research university administered by the Philippine Southern Province of the Society of the Divine Word in Cebu City, Philippines since 1935. It traces its origins to the Seminario-Colegio de San Carlos, the seminary of the then Diocese of Cebu, which opened in 1783 in the building which previously functioned as the Jesuit Colegio de San Ildefonso from 1595 to 1768. The Colegio separated from the seminary in 1924, and later became a university on July 1, 1948.

USC has two campuses with a combined land area of 88 hectares or 217 acres (Talamban campus has 78 hectares). The Commission on Higher Education has recognized eight of its programs as Centers of Excellence and 12 of its programs as Centers of Development as of March, 2016.

At present, USC has a population of 25,000+ students. Over 250 of them are foreign students enrolled in its undergraduate and graduate programs. It offers academic programs at the undergraduate and graduate level.

San Carlos's notable alumni include 1 Philippine president, senators and congressmen, presidential cabinet members, military officials, legal personages, journalists, awards laureates, celebrities, and businessmen.

== History ==
=== Early history ===
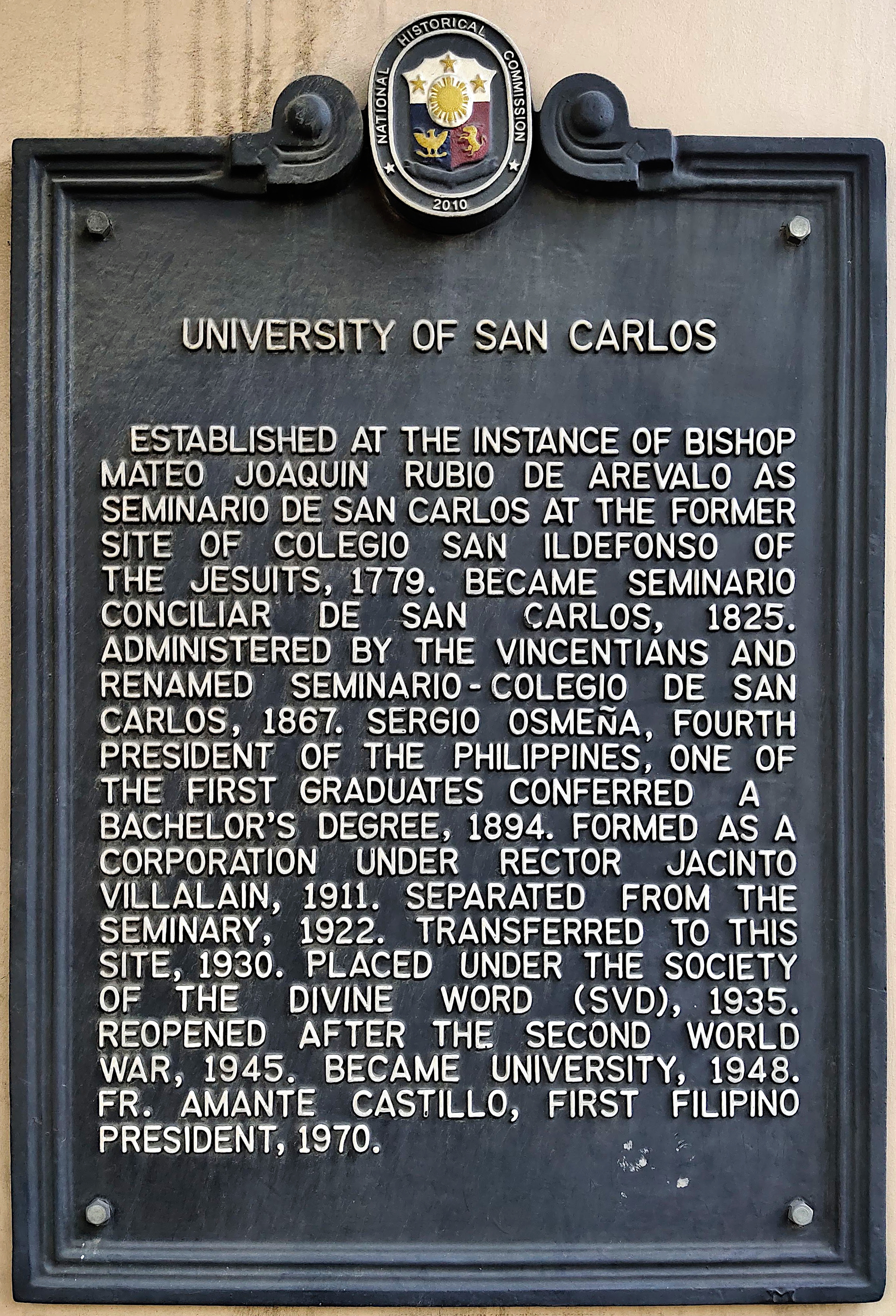
Historical marker installed by the National Historical Commission of the Philippines in 2010

The current claim of the Administration of the University of San Carlos is that the institution was originally founded as the Colegio de San Ildefonso, a grammar school attached to the Jesuit residence in Cebu. It was established by Spanish Jesuit missionaries Antonio Sedeño, Pedro Chirino and Antonio Pereira in 1595. The Colegio de San Ildefonso was closed in 1769 with the expulsion of the Jesuits from Spain and the Spanish dominions.

Prompted by the decree of the Council of Trent that every diocese must have a seminary for the formation and training of priests, Bishop Mateo Joaquin Rubio de Arevalo, in a letter dated October 25, 1777, petitioned Charles III of Spain for the legal bequest of the buildings of the old Colegio de San Ildefonso. This was granted by a royal decree dated October 29, 1779, which was subsequently confirmed by the Real Audiencia de Manila on the October 16, 1782. On August 23, 1783, the Spanish government officially turned over the properties that it had confiscated and hitherto owned, marking the birth of the Cebu Seminary, named the Real Seminario de San Carlos after the counter-reformation saint, St. Charles Borromeo.

Despite the founding of the seminary in 1783, there were no permanent faculty members during the first few years of its operation, as hardly anyone was trained for seminary administration and theological teaching. In 1825, the seminary's first rector, Fr. José Morales del Rosario, was appointed by the Dominican Bishop Francisco Genoves, and was followed by a series of secular rectors until 1867. Bishop Genoves was succeeded by Bishop Romualdo Jimeno, another Dominican, whose episcopate saw the help of his confreres from the University of Santo Tomas in Manila, which drastically improved the seminary's quality of education.

The royal decree of Isabela II of Spain (1830–1904) dated October 19, 1852 mandated the establishment of the Congregation of the Mission (Vincentians) in the Philippine Islands "so that they should take charge of the teaching and administration of the Conciliar Seminaries." With this, Bishop Jimeno invited the Vincentian Fathers to take over the seminary in 1863. In 1867, the seminary was formally turned over to Fr. José Casarramona, CM., who became rector. On May 15, 1867, in response to the local elite's petition to allow their sons to study, the seminary allowed laymen to study as externs (colegiales), by decree of Bishop Jimeno: "...in order that they may be duly instructed in science and virtue."

A royal decree dated May 20, 1865, called for a system of Secondary Education (Segunda Enseñanza) which introduced a well-planned program for a five-year course of Humanistic Studies leading to the degree of Bachiller en Artes (Bachelor of Arts). The decree vested to the University of Santo Tomas in Manila, through its Rector, the direction, supervision and responsibility for the good running of such schools; the conduct of final examinations at the end of the five-year course; and the awarding of all diplomas of the Bachelor of Arts degree. The first of such schools in Cebu was only founded in 1887 by Martin Logarta, which closed down two years after. In response, in 1887 Bishop Martin Alcocer of Cebu pleaded to the Vincentian administration of the Seminario-Colegio de San Carlos to send more personnel in order to comply with government standards. The University of Santo Tomas recognized the five-year program of the Seminario-Colegio de San Carlos, and in 1894, the first batch of Cebuanos arrived in Manila and passed the examination for the Bachelor of Arts degree.

=== Claim of being the oldest in the Philippines ===
USC's claims as the "oldest educational institution or school in Asia" has long been a subject of disputes with the University of Santo Tomas, which claims to be the "oldest university in Asia".

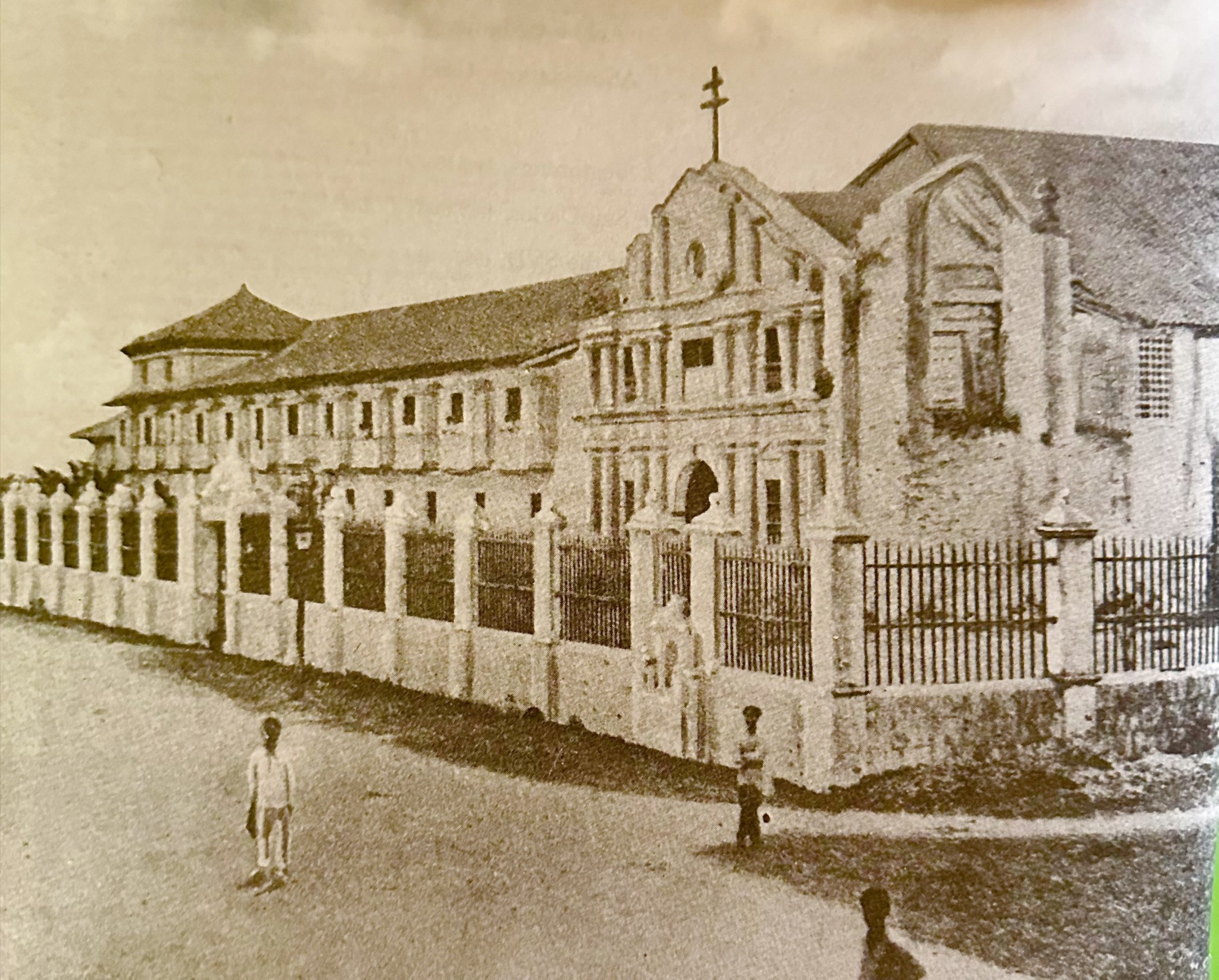
The facade of the Seminario-Colegio de San Carlos at the start of the Vincentian administration

However, this position is contested by scholars. According to Fr. Aloysius Cartagenas, a professor at the Seminario Mayor de San Carlos of Cebu, “following Church tradition, the foundation event and date of University of San Carlos should be the decree of Bishop Romualdo Jimeno on May 15, 1867 (turning over the seminary to the Congregation of the Missions) and the first day of classes in the history of what is now USC is July 1, 1867, the day Fr. José Casarramona welcomed the first lay students to attend classes at the Seminario de San Carlos.” Thus, he says that San Carlos cannot claim to have descended from the Colegio de San Ildefonso founded by the Jesuits in 1595, despite taking over the latter's facilities when the Jesuits were expelled by Spanish authorities in 1769. According to him there is “no visible and clear link” between Colegio de San Ildefonso and USC. San Carlos was specifically for the training of diocesan priests, and it simply took over the facility of the former, a Jesuit central house with an attached day school.

The university, as an autonomous institute as per the modern definition of a university, started to function in 1867. Though claims have been made to its origin as an autonomous institute at the time of opening of a seminary as a religious school of indoctrination in 1783. University even stretches the claim of its origin back to founding of another center of religious teaching in 1595, which was later closed down. Thus claims about being the oldest, and being a university in its earlier versions or the claims of using shut down institutes as its constituents are concocted and disputed. In 2010, the National Historical Commission of the Philippines installed a bronze marker declaring USC's foundation late in the 18th century, effectively disproving any direct connection with the Colegio de San Ildefonso.

According to Victor Torres of the De La Salle University, the University of San Carlos' claim dates back to 1948 only when USC was declared a university. Fidel Villarroel from the University of Santo Tomas argued that USC only took over the facility of the former Colegio de San Ildefonso and that there is no 'visible' and 'clear' link between San Carlos and San Ildefonso. In 2010, the National Historical Commission of the Philippines installed a bronze marker declaring USC's foundation late in the 18th century, effectively disproving any direct connection with the Colegio de San Ildefonso.

=== Later history ===
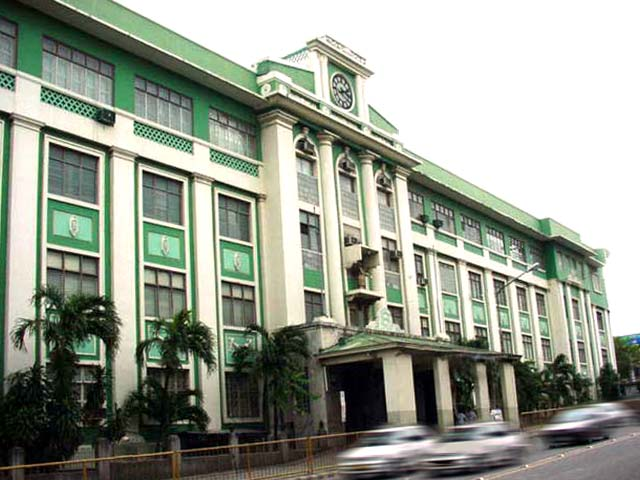
Facade of the Fr. Arthur Dingman Building prior to having its current color scheme

After the transition from Spanish to American rule over the Philippines, the Seminario-Colegio obtained government recognition in 1912, under the rectorship of Fr. Jacinto Villalain. In 1924, Seminario-Colegio de San Carlos was split into a seminary and a college in response to Pope Pius XI's apostolic letter Officiorum omnium, which decreed that "seminaries should serve no other purpose than that for which they were founded." One of the institutions that emerged from this split was named San Carlos College (Colegio de San Carlos). In the 1930s, the San Carlos College moved to a different location, P. del Rosario Street, while the seminary remained at Martires Street (currently M.J. Cuenco Avenue). In 1934, the College of Liberal Arts was reopened in the new building along P. del Rosario after facing a closure in 1927.

The Fathers of the Society of the Divine Word (SVD) took over the College in 1935, while the Seminary remained under the Vincentian Fathers until 1998. The first SVD rector of the San Carlos College was Fr. Arthur Dingman. In 1937, the Colleges of Law and Commerce were opened, followed by the College of Education in 1938, and by the College of Engineering in 1939. 1940 marked an important year in the history of the institution, as it was in this year when women were first admitted into the collegiate section under the Junior Normal School, opened in the same year.

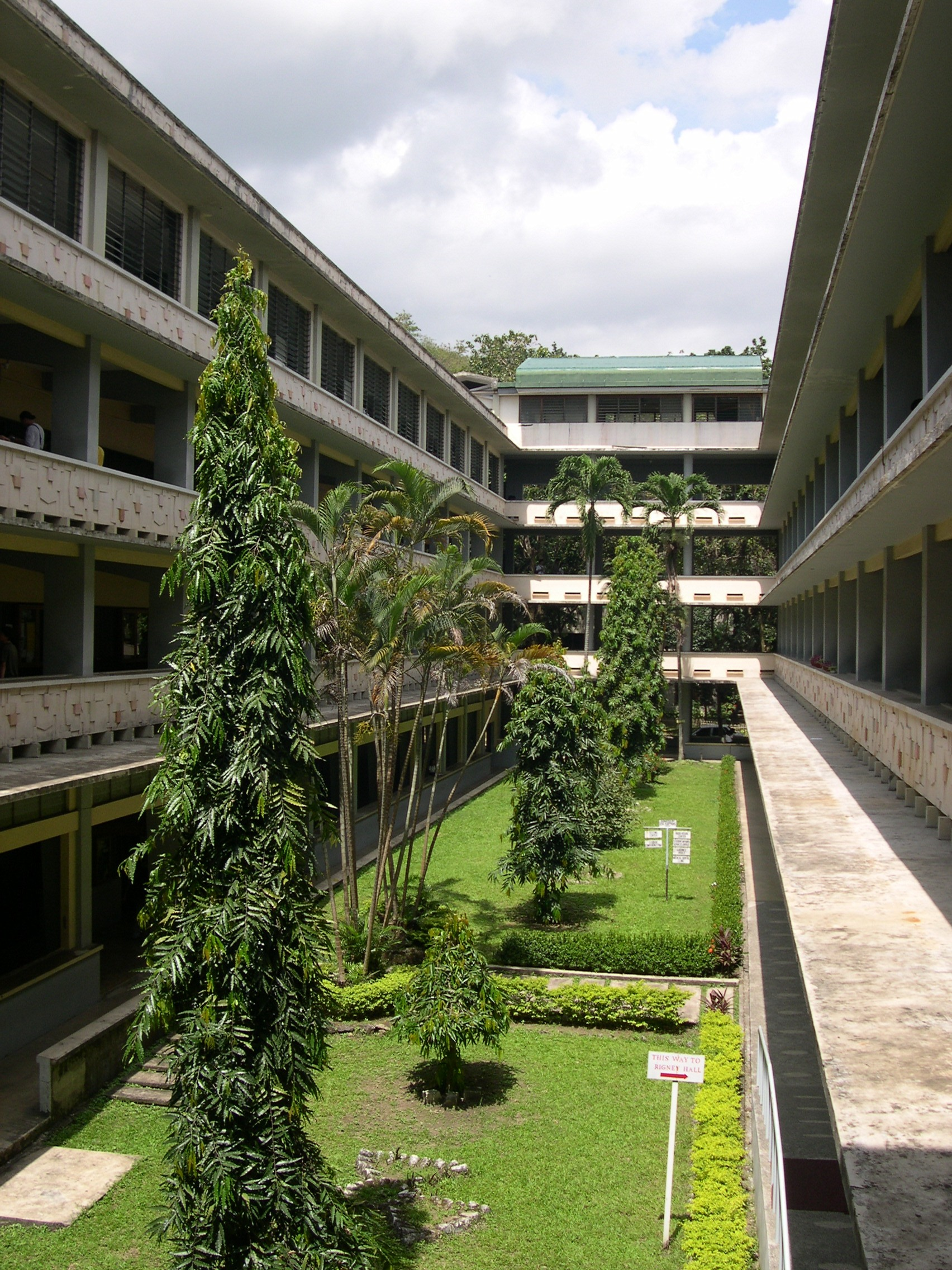
Courtyard of the Fr. Lawrence Bunzel Building

The Second World War saw the closure of the college in 1941. Japanese troops used the college's building as a garrison and a storage facility for food and ammunition. Shortly before Liberation, in 1944, the school was bombed by US forces, but it reopened in 1945. In 1946, the Cathedral Convent of Cebu and the Little Flower Academy along P. Gomez Street were rebuilt as a training department for the Education and Junior Normal students. In the same year, the following colleges were reopened: Normal, Education, Commerce, Law, and Engineering. In 1947, the College of Pharmacy was opened. San Carlos became a university in 1948, right after the completion of the Science Building (now called the J. Watzlawik Wing) along Pelaez Street. The Main Building along P. del Rosario (now called the A. Dingman Wing) was constructed in 1949, and was finished in 1950.

A few years after Liberation, San Carlos also commenced the construction of the first concrete building in Cebu across Pelaez Street, which was used for the Boys' High School. In the same block along P. del Rosario was the Santo Rosario Parish, then administered by SVD, as well as the Girls' High School. In 1946, San Carlos opened a campus in Dumanjug (now administered by the Oblates of Notre Dame as Little Flower School Inc.). In 1955, the Boys' HS moved to a campus along Mango Avenue (General Maxilom Avenue). In 1962, the Girls' HS also moved to a different campus along J. Alcantara, which was also used for the training of teachers (Teachers' College). Currently, the former building for Boys' HS has been converted to a multi-purpose building, while the former Girls' HS is now a Landbank branch.

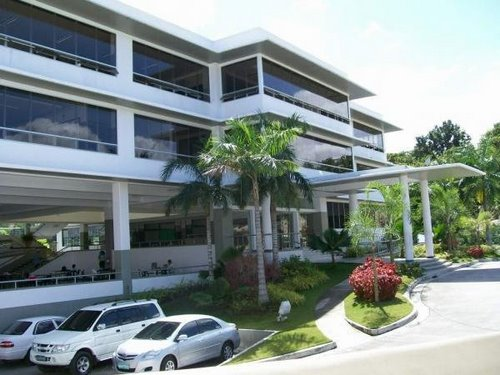
SAFAD Building.

Following the persecution of foreign clergy by the Chinese Communist Party in 1949, the University of San Carlos benefited significantly from the arrival of SVD priest-scholars from institutes such as the Catholic University of Peking (now the Fu Jen Catholic University, Taiwan). This unplanned influx spurred pioneering research in fields such as anthropology, physics, engineering, and philosophy, greatly contributing to the nation's post-war reconstruction. In 1963, the first Coconut Chemical Plant was opened by the University San Carlos in Talamban, as a joint project of the German and Philippine governments. In the same year, the Institute of Technology (College of Engineering and Architecture) was opened in the Talamban Campus. The building occupied by this institute is now known as the L. Bunzel Building.

In the 1960s, USC underwent rapid expansion under the guidance of foreign priest-academicians. This period of growth coincided with a surge of militant nationalism, which led to calls for the Filipinization of all Catholic school administrations in the country. In 1970, Fr. Amante Castillo became the first Filipino president of USC, marking a pivotal change.

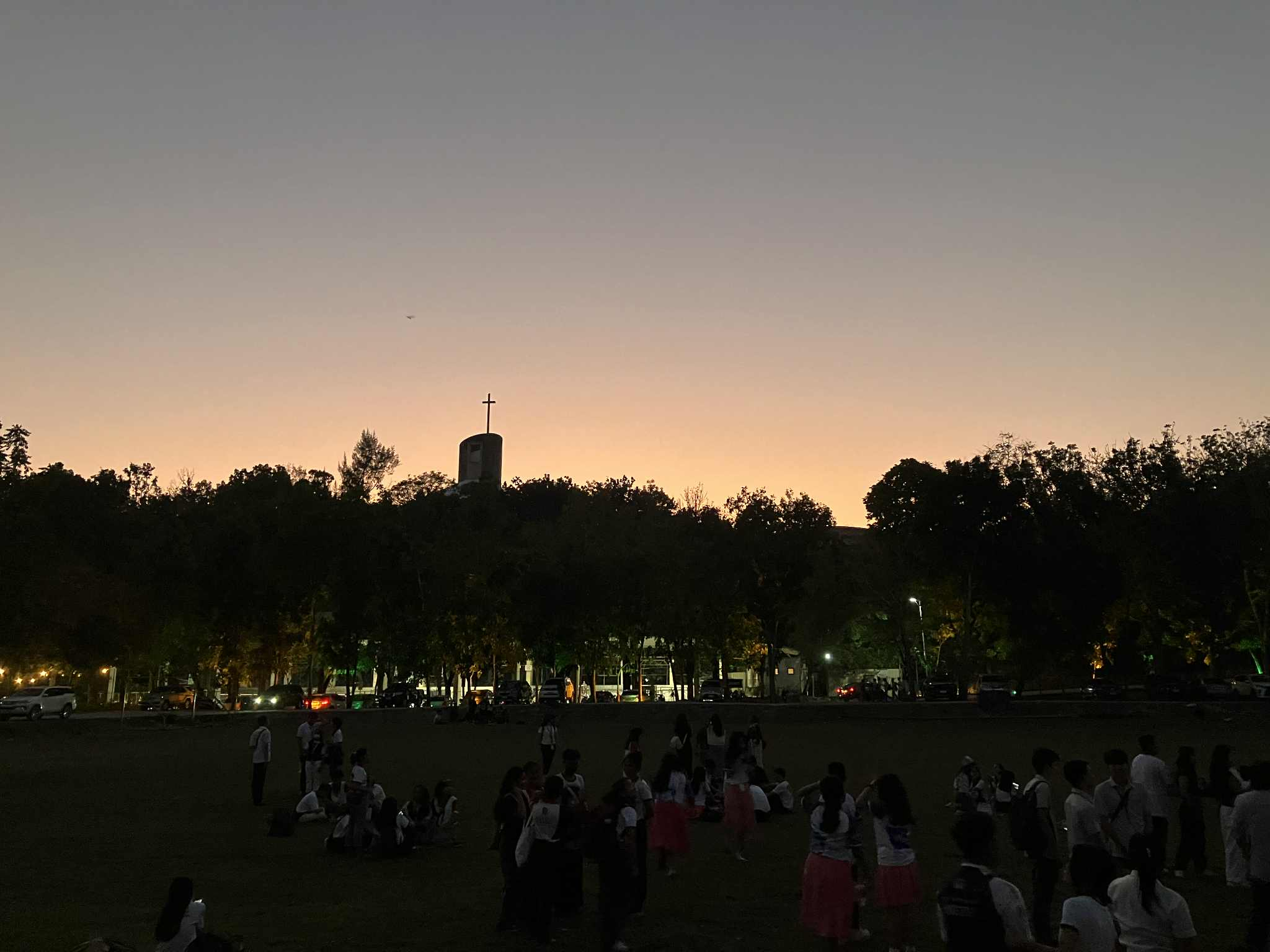
Soccer field of the Talamban Campus at dusk

In the subsequent decades, USC continued to expand and was often involved in significant national events, including the Martial Law era in the 1970s and the People Power Revolution at EDSA in 1986. Starting in the 1980s, the Talamban expansion was further developed, with the construction of the Arnoldus Science Complex and Retreat House (1982), Church of Sts. Arnold and Joseph (1985), Science and Mathematics Education Building (1997), Maintenance and Calibration Workshop (1998), Arts and Sciences Building (1999) later named as the P. van Engelen Building, Health Sciences Building for the College of Nursing and the College of Pharmacy (2004) later named as the R. Hoeppener Building, College of Architecture and Fine Arts Building (2005), Engineering Conference Center (2008) later named as the M. Richartz Building, and the Josef Baumgartner Learning Resource Center (2012). In the Downtown Campus, the following buildings were constructed after the transfer of the College of Arts and Sciences to the Talamban Campus: Law and Graduate Business Building (2009) later named the E. Hoerdemann Building, Wrocklage Yard (2010), Carolinian Inn (2011), Kolk's Nook (2011), and Language Academy (2013).

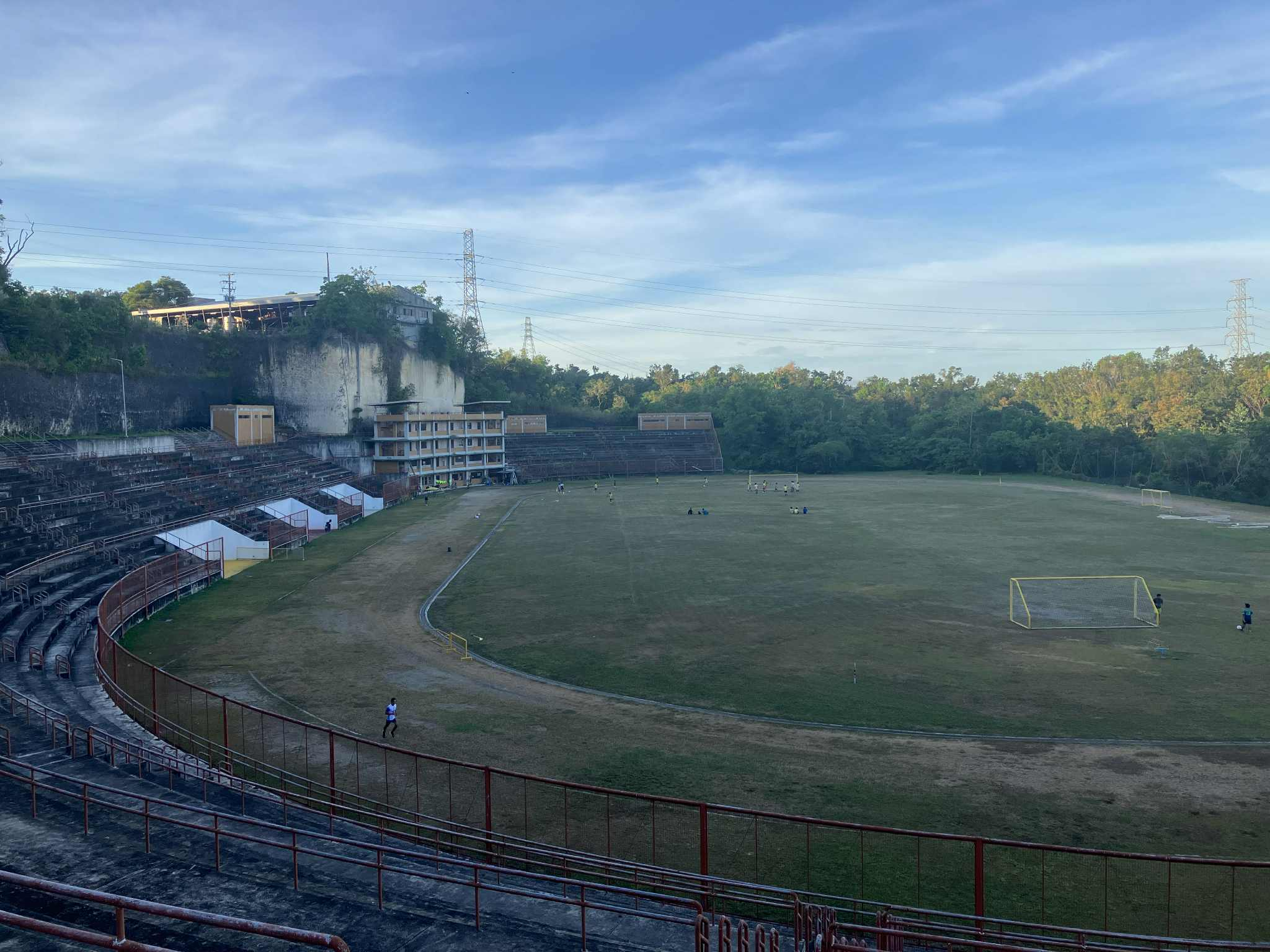
Campus stadium of the Talamban Campus

Cardinal-elect Ladislav Nemet served as USC's chaplain in the 1980s. In 2012, USC inaugurated one of the country's biggest university central library and learning resource center at the Talamban campus. Infrastructure development of USC Talamban campus is being undertaken continuously with the expansion and building of access roads within the campus, underground cabling of utilities and communication lines, and construction of the new university stadium, conference and tourism center. USC Talamban campus is envisioned as an Univer-City by 2030 one of the first among the universities in the country.

USC suffered significant backlash when on April 26, 2020, broadcaster Bobby Nalzaro wrote on a newspaper column about his worries over a reported announcement by the university that classes in all levels would resume on May 4, barely a week after the enhanced community quarantine in the city (ECQ) was to end under the city's original lockdown schedule of April 28 (which was later postponed to May 15). This announcement by the school sparked a large online backlash from the students, which expanded to backlash from other concerned parties after the extension was announced.

In 2025, the USC Basic Education department was formally separated from the rest of the university as San Carlos School of Cebu, Inc. (SCSC), still under the administration of the SVD. SCSC's grand launching ceremony was held on September 5, 2025.

== Campuses ==
USC consists of two campuses in different areas of Metro Cebu, with a combined land area of 88 hectares.

=== Downtown Campus ===
USC's Downtown Campus (DC), colloquially referred to as the Main Campus, is located in a city block enclosed by P. del Rosario Street, Pelaez Street, Sanciangko Street, and Junquera Street. This campus primarily holds the School of Business and Economics and the School of Law and Governance. The buildings of the Downtown Campus are among the oldest structures in the university.

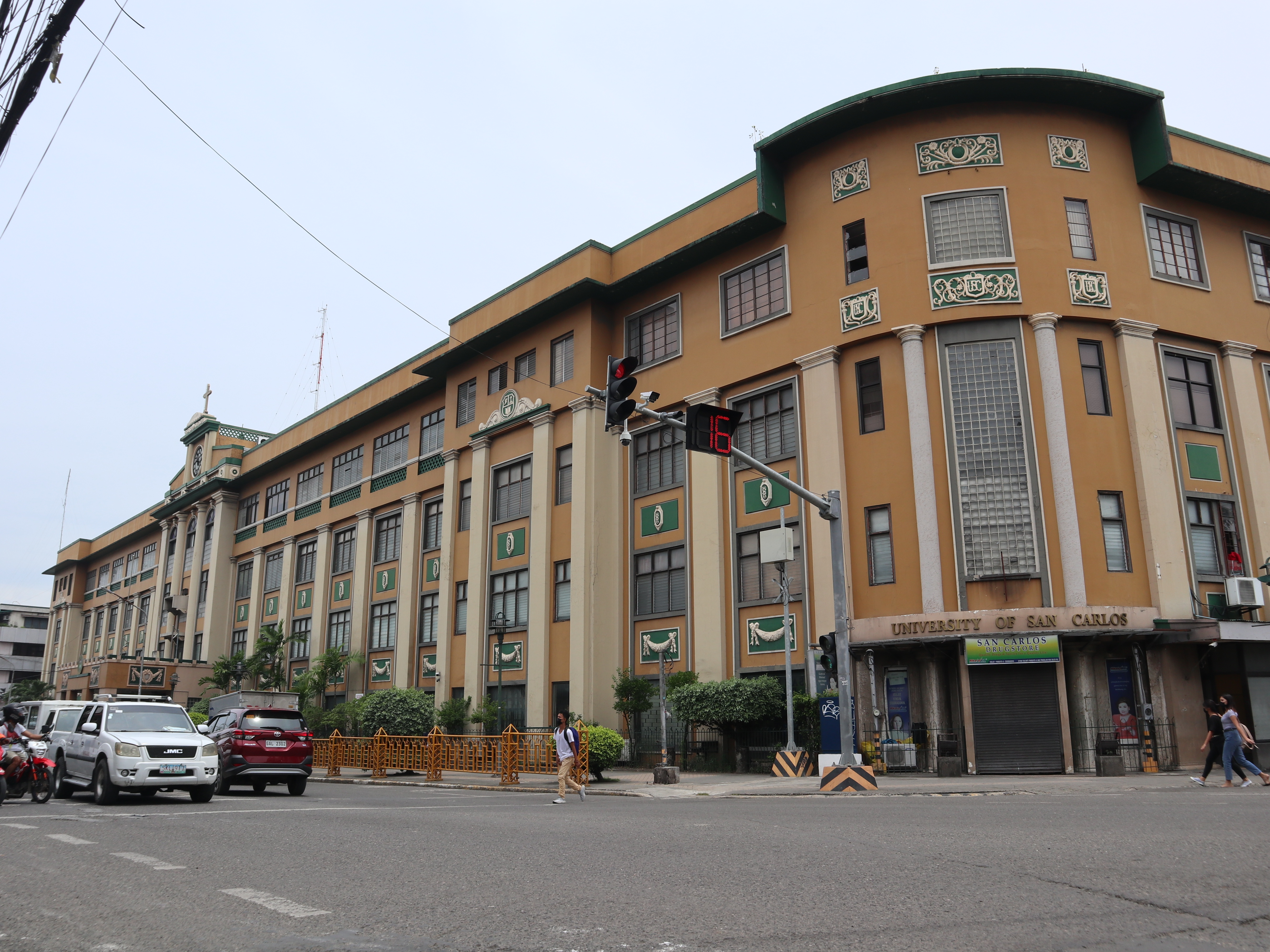
Fr. Arthur Dingman Building

Fr. Arthur Dingman Building, which is perhaps USC's most recognizable facade. It was formerly known as the Administration Building. Designed by Paolo Beltran in the beaux-arts style, the building is USC's oldest standing edifice, being built from 1947 to 1951. This building replaced an older college building, which was destroyed during the September 12, 1944 pre-liberation bombings of Cebu. It is listed as an Important Cultural Property. Connected to the building is an annex which houses the campus chapel and the library. A part of the annex is the oldest part of the building, surviving the 1944 bombings.

Fr. Joseph Watzlawik Building, also known as the Old Science Building. Located along Pelaez Street, the building used to house the pharmacy department, among others. Currently, it houses the Carolinian Inn and the Carolinian Cafe, as well as other lecture halls used by the School of Business and Economics. The building is connected to the Arthur Dingman Building by a structure called the transitorium.

Abp. Gabriel Reyes Building. Completed in 1958, this academic building was built to house the commerce department. The building contains the Fr. Theodore Buttenbruch AV Hall. The building is named after Gabriel Martelino Reyes, who served as Archbishop of Cebu from 1934 to 1949, and then served as the first Filipino Archbishop of Manila.

Fr. Ernest Hoerdemann Building, formerly known as the Law and Graduate Business Building, which is located near the corner of Pelaez Street and Sanciangko Street. Completed in 2009, it is the newest building in the Downtown Campus. The building houses the College of Law and the Department of Political Science.

Fr. Anselmo Bustos Sports Complex, also referred to as the DC Gym. It is a large covered gymnasium. It is used for multiple university-wide occasions, notably the opening and closing ceremonies of the annual University Days.

St. Raphael House. It houses the St. Raphael Community of the Society of Divine Word Philippine Southern Province. The building was completed in 1961.

=== Talamban Campus ===
USC's Talamban Campus (TC) is its largest campus by land area, occupying a 78 hectare property in Talamban, Cebu City, along Gov. M. Cuenco Avenue. The campus landscape is known for its steep terrain, being situated at the foot of Cebu's central mountain range. It is marked by its forest-like greenery, as it populated with various species of trees. This campus hosts the School of Engineering, School of Arts and Sciences, School of Education, School of Healthcare Professions, and the School of Architecture, Fine Arts, & Design.

Fr. Lawrence Bunzel Building, formerly known as the Technological Center. This building is the most recognizable building in the campus, and is the only major building entirely visible from the campus gates. It is the oldest in the campus, inaugurated in 1966. The building is home to the School of Engineering, which was the first school to move to the Talamban Campus.

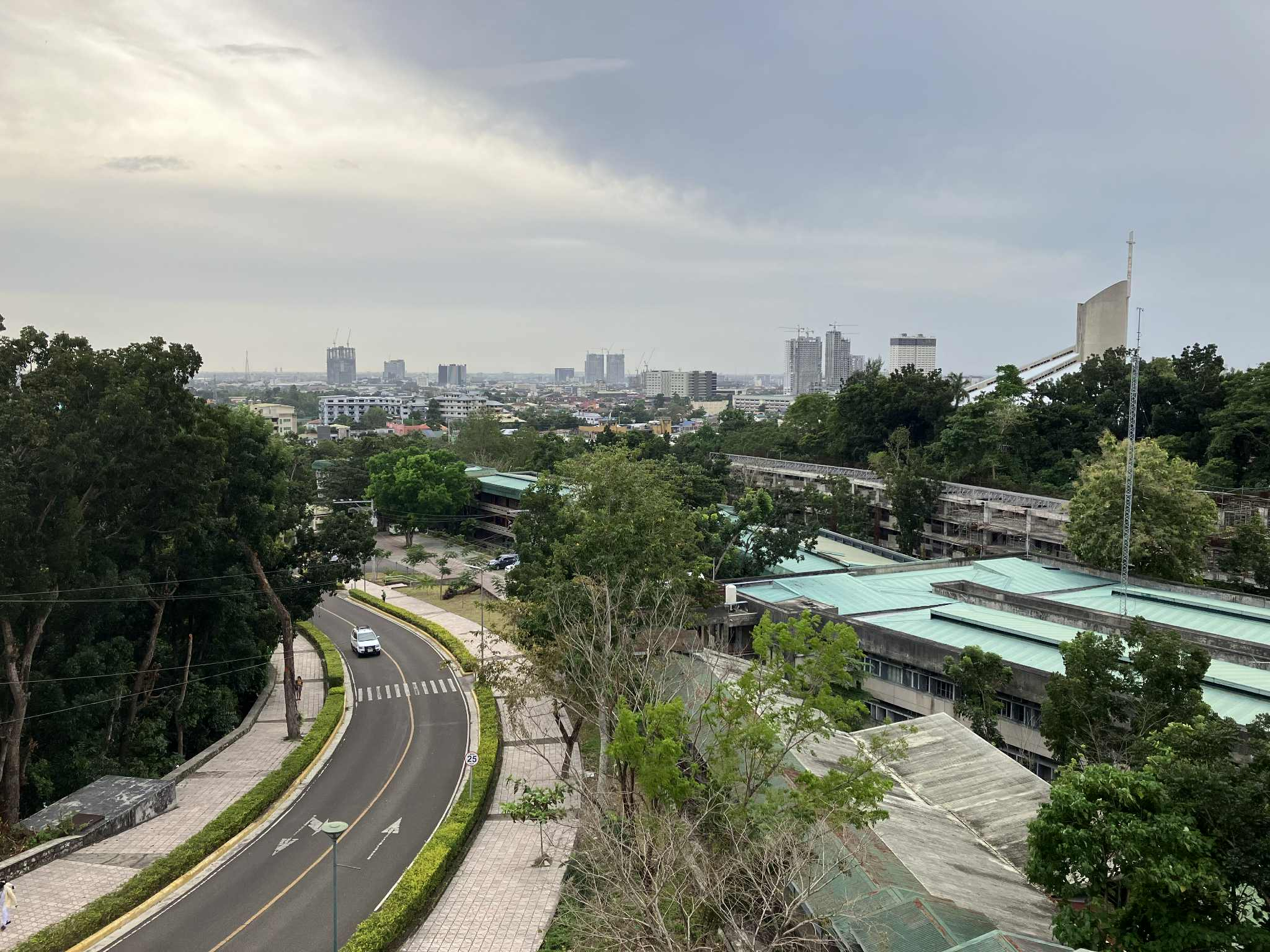
Arnoldus Science Complex (foreground) viewed from the Fr. Philip van Engelen Building

Fr. Philip van Engelen Building, formerly known as the Arts and Sciences Building. It houses the liberal arts departments of the School of Arts & Sciences.

Fr. Robert Hoeppener Building. The building houses the School of Healthcare Professions.

Fr. Joseph Baumgartner Learning Resource Center, commonly referred to as the LRC. The building houses the university's central library. It is dubbed as the biggest library building in the country. Aside from the various book collections, the building also houses the USC Biological Museum, which has an extensive natural history collection.

Fr. Michael Richartz Center. The building's primary feature is the Michael Richartz Hall, which is a large conference hall located in the center of the building. The installation ceremonies of the recent university presidents were held in this building.. The building also has a few classrooms and other facilities, mainly used by tourism management students.

SAFAD Building. Among the most recently built buildings in the Talamban Campus, it hosts the School of Architecture, Fine Arts, & Design (SAFAD). The building is noted for its minimalist architecture, as well as its vibrant murals along the SAFAD Theatre.

Multiple buildings were largely designed by Fr. Winand Klassen, SVD, in the brutalist style:

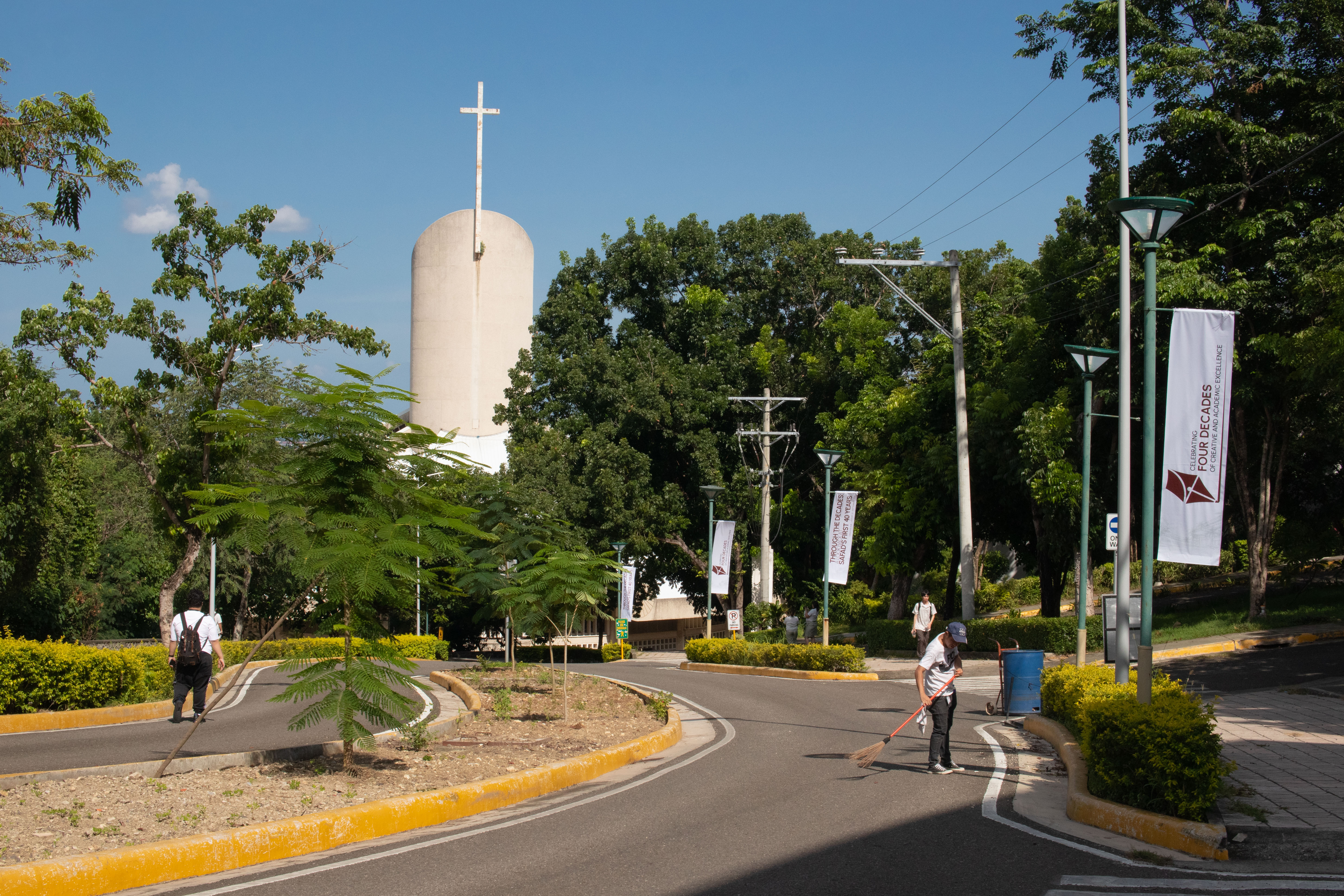
Scenery of the Talamban Campus (with the TC Church in the background)

Arnoldus Science Complex, also known as the Science Building, which is home to the natural science departments of the SAS. It was completed in 1981, and is the second oldest major building of the campus. The building is divided into three wings, namely the Fr. Edgar Oehler Wing (chemistry), Fr. Francis Oster Wing (physics), and the Fr. Enrique Schoenig Wing (biology). The building has an annex called the Science and Mathematics Education (SMED) Building, which houses the School of Education since the 2020s.

Church of St. Arnold Janssen and Joseph Freinademetz, also known as the TC Church was consecrated by Cardinal Ricardo Vidal on March 24, 2004. It serves as the church of the local campus, and houses the philosophy department.

St. Joseph Freinademetz Formation House, occupying the former facilities of the SVD Retreat House. It is the central house and seminary for the brotherhood candidates of the Society of the Divine Word Philippine Southern Province.

The Talamban Campus has various sporting venues, including a covered basketball court, a stadium, and a soccer field

== Administration and organization ==
School	Year founded
Arts and Sciences	1891*
Law and Governance	1937
Business and Economics	1937
Education	1938
Engineering	1939
Healthcare Professions	1947
Architecture, Fine Arts, and Design	1984
* There is no consensus on the founding date. 1891 was when the Bachiller en Artes degree program was instituted.

The University of San Carlos is governed by a Board of Trustees, consisting of ten members. The Board elects the University President, who as the chief executive officer, appoints the Vice Presidents, Chaplain, Deans, Registrar, Principals, and other officers. The President is assisted by three vice presidents: one for Academic Affairs, one for Administration, and one for Finance. These officers constitute the President's Cabinet. Each university president serves three year terms, and is eligible for reappointment.

The University is divided into seven collegiate schools, each headed by a dean. Each school is divided into multiple academic departments devoted to a specific discipline, each headed by a department chair. USC's seven collegiate schools are as follows:

- School of Arts and Sciences (SAS)
- School of Law and Governance (SLG)
- School of Business and Economics (SBE)
- School of Education (SEd)
- School of Engineering (SOE)
- School of Healthcare Professions (SHCP)
- School of Architecture, Fine Arts, and Design (SAFAD)

The College of Law, which is organized under the School of Law & Governance, is headed by its own dean.

== Academics ==
=== Degree programs ===
The University of San Carlos offers education at the undergraduate and graduate levels, through its various academic units. As of 2024, the university offers 45 undergraduate degree programs, along with 34 graduate programs, three of which are professional degree programs.

University of San Carlos program offerings per school (2026–2027):

School	Undergraduate programs	Graduate programs	Postgraduate programs
School of Arts and Sciences (SAS)	Bachelor of Arts in Anthropology; Bachelor of Arts in Communication Major in Media; Bachelor of Arts in English Language Studies; Bachelor of Arts in Literary and Cultural Studies With Creative Writing; Bachelor of Philosophy; Bachelor of Science in Psychology; Bachelor of Science in Biology; Bachelor of Science in Marine Biology; Bachelor of Science in Chemistry; Bachelor of Science in Computer Science; Bachelor of Science in Data Science; Bachelor of Science in Information Technology; Bachelor of Science in Information Systems; Bachelor of Science in Applied Physics	Master of Arts in Anthropology; Master of Arts in Applied Linguistics; Master of Arts in Literature; Master of Arts in Philosophy; Master of Arts in Psychology Major in (Clinical Psychology, Industrial-Organizational Psychology, and Social Psychology); Master of Science in Biology; Master of Science in Marine Biology; Master of Science in Environmental Science; Master of Science in Information Technology; Master of Science in Physics	Doctor of Philosophy in Anthropology; Doctor of Philosophy in Philosophy; Doctor of Philosophy in Biology (Bioscience Track); Doctor of Philosophy in Information Technology; Doctor of Philosophy in Physics
School of Law and Governance (SLG)	Bachelor of Arts in Political Science Major in (Law & Policy Studies, and International Relations & Foreign Service)	Master of Arts in Political Science; Juris Doctor (thesis/non-thesis)	
School of Business and Economics (SBE)	Bachelor of Science in Business Administration Major in (Financial Management, Human Resource Management, Marketing Management, and Operations Management); Bachelor of Science in Accountancy; Bachelor of Science in Management Accounting; Bachelor of Science in Internal Auditing; Bachelor of Science in Economics; Bachelor of Science in Economics with Data Analytics; Bachelor of Science in Hospitality Management; Bachelor of Science in Tourism Management	Master of Business Administration (Professional Track and Thesis Track); Exacutive Master of Business Administration; Master of Science in Accountancy; Master in Management Accounting; Master in Internal Auditing; Master of Arts in Economics; Master of Management Major in (Hospitality Management and Tourism Management)	Doctor of Philosophy in Business Administration
School of Education (SEd)	Bachelor of Special Needs Education Specialization Early Childhood Education-Montessori Education; Bachelor of Secondary Education Major in (Mathematics and Science)	Master of Arts in Education Major in (Montessori Education - Primary or Lower Elementary and Special Education); Master of Arts in Mathematics Education; Master of Arts in Science Education Major in Biology, Chemistry, and Physics	Doctor of Philosophy in Education Major in Research and Evaluation; Doctor of Philosophy in Science Education Major in Biology, Chemistry, and Physics
School of Engineering (SOE)	Bachelor of Science in Civil Engineering; Bachelor of Science in Chemical Engineering; Bachelor of Science in Computer Engineering; Bachelor of Science in Electrical Engineering; Bachelor of Science in Electronics Engineering; Bachelor of Science in Industrial Engineering; Bachelor of Science in Mechanical Engineering	Master of Science in Civil Engineering Major in (Water Resources & Environment and Structural Engineering); Master of Science in Chemical Engineering; Master of Science in Computer Engineering; Master of Science in Electronics Engineering Major in (Computer & Communications Option and Instrumentation & Control Option); Master of Science in Industrial Engineering; Master of Science in Mechanical Engineering	Doctor of Engineering
School of Healthcare Professions (SHCP)	Bachelor of Science in Pharmacy; Bachelor of Science in Nursing; Bachelor of Science in Nurtrition and Dietetics	Master of Science in Pharmacy; Master of Science in Pharmaceutical Sciences; Doctor of Pharmacy	
School of Architecture, Fine Arts, and Design (SAFAD)	Bachelor of Science in Architecture; Bachelor of Science in Interior Design; Bachelor of Landscape Architecture; Bachelor of Fine Arts Major in (Advertising Arts and Cinema)	Master of Architecture Major in (Architectural Science, Urban Design, Interior Architecture, and Landscape Architecture)	

=== Reputation and rankings ===
University rankings

Global – Overall
- QS World: 1401+ (2025)

Regional – Overall
- QS Asia: 507 (2026)

National – Overall
- QS National: 6 (2026)

The University of San Carlos (USC) has received significant recognition in various university rankings. The QS Quacquarelli Symonds World University Rankings (WUR) for 2024 and 2025 placed USC within the 1,201-1,400 range and at 1,401, respectively. For the 2025 edition, only five universities from the Philippines are included in these rankings. In the QS Asia University Rankings, USC falls within the 500-550 range and ranks 94th in the QS Asia South-Eastern Asia University Rankings. QS also ranked USC as the 6th best university in the Philippines for 2026. USC had also made its debut in the QS Sustainability Rankings 2026, placing in the 1401–1500 global bracket and among the eight Philippine universities that entered the sustainability ranking this year.

USC ranked in the Times Higher Education (THE) Impact Rankings 2024 and in 2025. It obtained an overall rank of 1501+ with an overall score of 41.3. The University ranked highest (401–600) in three SDGs, namely SDG 6, SDG 8, and SDG 14. Based on scores, the University performed well in SDG 8, SDG 5, and SDG 7 in 2024. In 2025, USC improved to the 1001–1500 bracket with an overall score of 52.2, reporting on nine SDGs and performing strongest in SDG 7 (Affordable and Clean Energy) where it ranked 301–400 globally.

Additionally, as of 2024, EduRank placed USC 7th in its list of the 100 best universities in the Philippines. The Webometrics Ranking of World Universities ranks USC 8th nationwide. The SCImago Institutions Rankings (SIR) for research and innovation ranked USC 8th among universities in the Philippines. The Institute for Research, Innovation, and Scholarship (IRIS) ranked USC 8th in science, 9th in engineering, and 7th in health for research productivity during the 2021–2022 period. The University of San Carlos was ranked 129th on AppliedHE's "All Asia Private University Ranking 2026".

=== Research and extension ===
The university has drawn in external grants amounting to about PHP350M (US$7M) from 2018 to 2022. Internal research grants of about PHP45M (US$754k) have also been awarded from the University Research Trust Fund within the same time period, while an additional PHP325M (US$6M) has been earmarked for laboratory facilities development anticipating the current changes in the Philippine educational system. About 140 faculty members are actively engaged in research with 315 papers published in internationally referred journals and 46 research collaboration agreements with international and Philippine-based institutions (2018–2022).

Research efforts are supported by a print collection of over 200,000 titles and almost 10,000 non-print volumes housed in the university's library system, along with subscriptions to 17 online journals. USC also publishes three respected scholarly journals, The Philippine Scientist, the Philippine Quarterly of Culture and Society and Devotio: Journal of Business and Economics Studies. Additional support for researchers are available through offices or committees providing ethics review, intellectual property and innovation and technology support, and animal care and use.

The university has filed nineteen patents with the Intellectual Property Office of the Philippines (IPOPHL) and two patents granted from 2012 to 2022, and one start-up company, Green Enviro Management Systems (GEMS), Inc., has been established. USC has the following specialized research centers, research groups, and laboratories operated and maintained by the different academic departments.

Research Centers

- Medical Biophysics Group (MBG)-Center for Tissue Engineering and Biological Soft Materials
- Center for Geoinformatics and Environmental Solutions (CenGES)
- Center for Research of Energy Systems and Technologies (CREST)
- Conservation of Heritage and Research Institute for Society and its History (CHERISH)
- DOST-USC Tuklas Lunas (Drug Discovery) Development Center (TLDC)
- Center for Social Research and Education (CSRE)
- Marine Biology Research Section
- Cebuano Studies Center (CSC)
- Office of Population Studies Foundation Inc. (OPSF)
- Water Resources Center Foundation Inc. (WRCF)
- USC Museum Studies & Galleries
  - (Spanish Colonial, Archeological, Ethnographic, Natural Science, Arcenas "Bahandi & Handuman", Finnigan Ifugao People of Cordillera, Japanese Fine Ceramics & Ningyo Dolls)

=== Recognitions ===
Commission on Higher Education accreditations
Center of Excellence	Center of Development
Anthropology; Business Administration; Chemical Engineering; Entrepreneurship; Mechanical Engineering; Office Administration; Physics; Teacher Education	Biology; Chemistry; Civil Engineering; Electrical Engineering; Electronics Engineering; Computer Engineering; Hotel & Restaurant Management; Industrial Engineering; Information Technology; Marine Science; Philosophy; Tourism

USC is recognized as a Center of Excellence (COE) by the Commission on Higher Education (CHED) in eight academic programs: anthropology, business administration, chemical engineering, entrepreneurship, mechanical engineering, office administration, physics, and teacher education. Additionally, USC is a Center of Development (COD) in civil engineering, electrical engineering, electronics engineering, computer engineering, industrial engineering, biology, chemistry, hotel and restaurant management, information technology, marine science, philosophy, and tourism. Nationwide, USC ranks fourth in the number of CHED-recognized centers, with eight COEs and twelve CODs As of 2016, and extended in 2019.

USC is ranked among the top-performing schools for 2008 to 2019 in the bar and board exams for law, accountancy, chemical engineering, chemistry, architecture, pharmacy, mechanical engineering, electrical engineering, and chemical technicians. USC has been granted autonomous status by the Commission on Higher Education (CHED) in 2001, 2005, 2009, 2016 and extended 2019.

USC is a charter and founding member of the Philippine Accrediting Association of Schools, Colleges and Universities (PAASCU), the USC Schools of Liberal Arts and Sciences, Education, and Business Administration are among the first schools, colleges, and undergraduate programs accredited by PAASCU since 1957. USC School of Engineering is the first PAASCU accredited engineering school in 1974. USC is reaccredited by PAASCU as Level III for 2015 to 2019 and 2020 to 2024.

USC School of Engineering

The USC School of Engineering is the lone Philippine university member of the School on the Internet-Asia (SOI-Asia), a consortium of 15 universities situated in 11 countries across Asia. It can be noted that the Philippines was first connected to the Internet at the 1st International E-mail conference held at USC in March 1994.

Seven programs of the School of Engineering (chemical engineering, civil engineering, computer engineering, electrical engineering, electronics engineering, mechanical engineering, and industrial engineering) were granted full accreditation by the Philippine Technological Council Accreditation and Certification Board for Engineering and Technology (PTC-ACBET) the authorized accrediting body in the Philippines of the Washington Accord as of 2020.

USC Bio-Process Engineering Research Center (BioPERC) of the Chemical Engineering (ChE) Department research and development (R&D) project on the re-use and re-utilization through biochemical processing of bio-organic wastes from processed mangoes and other tropical fruits into high value-added, healthy and anti-oxidant rich flour, fine poly-organic chemicals and activated carbon, is recognized by the World Intellectual Property Organization (WIPO) and Asia Pacific Economic Cooperation (APEC) as the "First Success Story" of an Intellectual Property (IP) technology innovation and commercialization from the academe in the Philippines. The technology developed was patented with the technical and administrative assistance of the Intellectual Property Office of the Philippines (IPOPHIL) and the USC Innovation & Technology Support Office (ITCO). The project catalyzed the inception of a new spin-off company Green Enviro Management Systems, Inc. (GEMS) which inaugurated and commenced full operation in 2015 of its processing plant facilities located in Lapu-Lapu City, Cebu.

USC School of Law and Governance

The USC School of Law and Governance was recognized by the Legal Education Board of the Supreme Court of the Philippines for excellence in legal education as being the fourth nationwide highest passing percentage and performance in the bar exams from 2012 to 2017. The USC School of Law and Governance moot court team is the first law school in the Visayas and Mindanao regions to win as champion of the nationwide Philippines Philip Jessup Moot Court Debate competition and represent the Philippines in the world's largest and most prestigious moot court debate the International Philip Jessup Moot Court Debate competition 2014 in Washington DC. USC moot court team made it to the finals top 10 and was awarded the best novice (new) team.

USC School of Law and Governance is the only law school in the Visayas and Mindanao to be granted a license by the Supreme Court to have a Clinical Legal Education Program (CLEP), whereby its senior students are allowed to handle actual cases in the court with the assistance and under the guidance of a licensed member of the bar. Likewise, it is the first law school in the Philippines outside Metro Manila to be accredited by the Supreme Court to conduct Mandatory Continuing Legal Education (MCLE) seminar for lawyers.

USC School of Business and Economics

The USC School of Business and Economics has been selected for the 2007/2008 Eduniversal 1,000 business schools that count on Earth by an International Scientific Committee. USC accountancy clinched the top performance with the highest passing percentage with at least 50 examinees and 5 board topnotchers in the May 2015, 2016 and 2018 CPA board exam.

The University of San Carlos (USC) School of Business and Economics received a "One Palm" ranking in the Eduniversal 2023 Business School Ranking, signifying its status as a locally preferred institution. Notably, USC is the only business school in the Philippines outside of Metro Manila to be included in this prestigious ranking, highlighting its excellence and reputation in the field of business education.

=== International Linkages ===
The University of San Carlos (USC) boasts significant international linkages that enrich its academic environment. With over 125 academic and institutional partnerships across 26 countries, USC has established a robust network fostering global collaboration. These partnerships span various regions, including ASEAN, the US, Europe, and East Asia, and involve joint research projects, faculty exchanges, and student exchange programs. This extensive network enhances the university's multicultural community, offering students and faculty opportunities to engage in diverse academic and cultural experiences, thereby supporting USC's commitment to global standards and excellence in education. Some of the more recent partnered Educational institutions are: TU Wien, Walailak University, University of Pecs, MATE Hungarian University of Agriculture and Life Sciences, Okayama University, Toho University, and Chiba University.

British Council United Kingdom and Philippines Transnational Education (TNE) bilateral cooperation with the Commission of Higher Education (CHED) granted in 2017 long-term institutional support and funding to USC School of Engineering dual graduate studies program on Doctor of Engineering with Coventry University in London, and the USC School of Architecture, Fine Arts and Design graduate program on Master of Design and Arts with Cardiff Metropolitan University in London.

== University publications ==
=== Today's Carolinian ===
The official student publication of USC is Today's Carolinian (TC), which is run by its editorial board and staff composed of graduate and undergraduate students of the university. The official slogan of the publication is "Our Commitment. Your Paper." According to its website and Facebook page, the publication began as a re-established student publication of the University of San Carlos during the 80s, almost 10 years after Marcos' Martial Law seized the existence of student publications and other student institutions nationwide. It happened when the students launched their first strike against the administration to reinstate the student council and the student publication of the USC. The students were victorious in reinstating the student government. The latter eventually brought back the student publication in September 1983. After some time in the early 2000s, the publication was shut down again and, with the efforts of the university's supreme student council, re-emerged in 2012.

In 2020, Today's Carolinian published an editorial on Facebook titled “A GOVERNOR IS NOT ABOVE THE CONSTITUTION,” condemning the alleged intimidation of the Cebu Provincial Governor Gwendolyn Garcia against critics. The governor, through her personal Facebook account, invited the editor-in-chief of TC, Berns Mitra, to her office on Wednesday, March 25, 2020, to discuss the matter. For the College Editors Guild of the Philippines (CEGP), this affirms the statement of TC that the governor is trying to intimidate her critics. CEGP urged the provincial government to focus on implementing mitigating measures against COVID-19 instead of focusing on criticisms.

=== USC Publishing House ===
The USC Publishing House, formerly the USC Press, has published about 500 volumes of research journals and about 110 books of academic research by the university's faculty, scholars, alumni, and partners since 1975. Its three major research journals published are: The Philippine Scientist, a journal of natural sciences; Philippine Quarterly of Culture and Society, a journal of humanities, arts, culture, history and social sciences; and Devotio: Journal of Business and Economics Studies. It also publishes research journals produced by different research centers and units of USC such as the Cebuano Studies Center, Kabilin Heritage Center, Water Resources Center, Office of Population Studies, Business Resource Center, and various academic schools and departments of the university.

== Notable alumni ==
Notable alumni of the university include Sergio Osmeña Sr., fourth President and the first vice president of the Philippines; Senators Vicente Rama, Vicente Sotto, Mariano Jesus Cuenco, Filemon Sotto, Sergio Osmeña III, John Henry Osmeña, Rene Espina, Manuel C. Briones; Napoleon G. Rama, Award-winning journalist, Floor Leader of the Constitutional Convention, Premio Zobel and Ninoy Aquino Memorial Award recipient; Congressmen Miguel Cuenco, Raul del Mar, and Pablo P. Garcia, and Glenn A. Chong; Governors Dionisio A. Jakosalem, Emilio Mario Osmeña, Osmundo G. Rama, and Hilario P. Davide III; Hilario G. Davide, Jr., Chief Justice of the Supreme Court of the Philippines; Aniano A. Desierto, former Ombudsman of the Republic of the Philippines; Edgardo Delos Santos, associate justice of the Supreme Court of the Philippines; Lourdes Reynes Quisumbing, PhD, secretary of Education, Culture and Sports; Ernesto Pernia, PhD, secretary of Economic Development and Planning and director general of National Economic and Development Authority (NEDA); Resil Mojares, PhD, Filipino historian and critic of Philippine literature, a National Artist of the Philippines for Literature; Antonio Abad, Premio Zobel winner in 1928 and 1929, a poet, fiction author, playwright and essayist; Erlinda Kintanar Alburo, PhD, contemporary Cebuano language scholar and promoter of the language; Ramon Fernandez, PBA player; Lauro Mumar, national team head coach of India and the Philippines; John Gokongwei, Jr.; businessman, self-made billionaire, philanthropist, founder and chairman of JG Summit Holdings; Eugene Acevedo, businessman and president of Rizal Commercial Banking Corporation (RCBC).

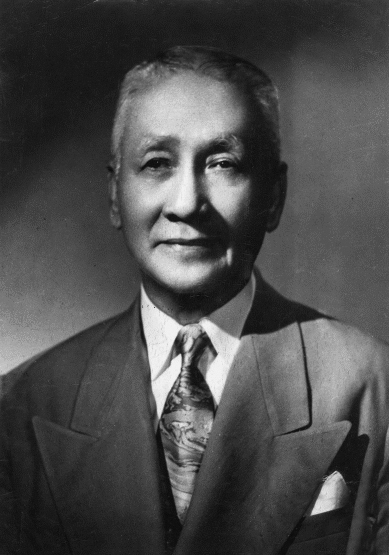
Sergio Osmeña Sr, 4th president of the Philippines

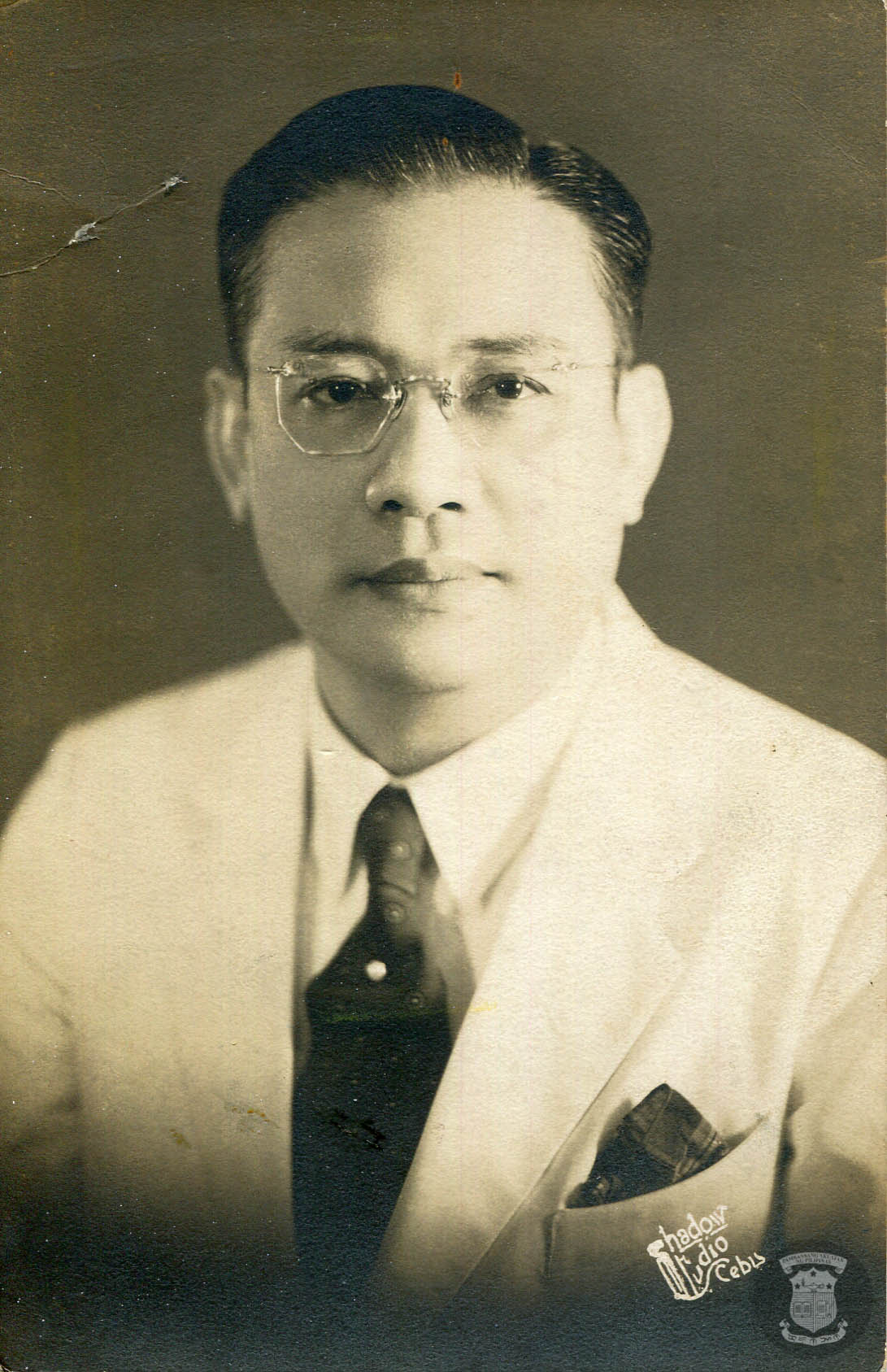
Vicente Rama, the "father of Cebu City"

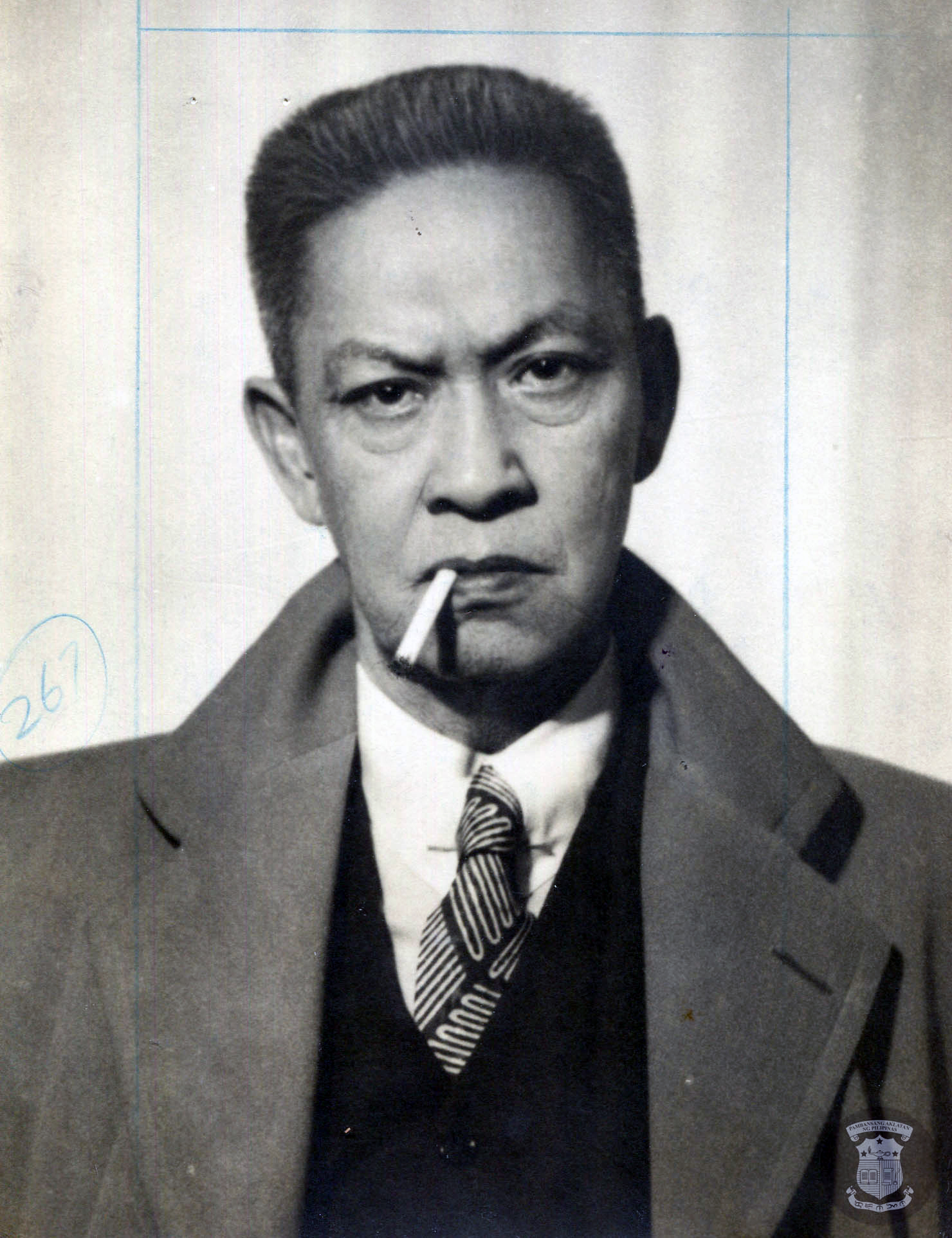
Vicente Sotto, the "father of Cebuano journalism"

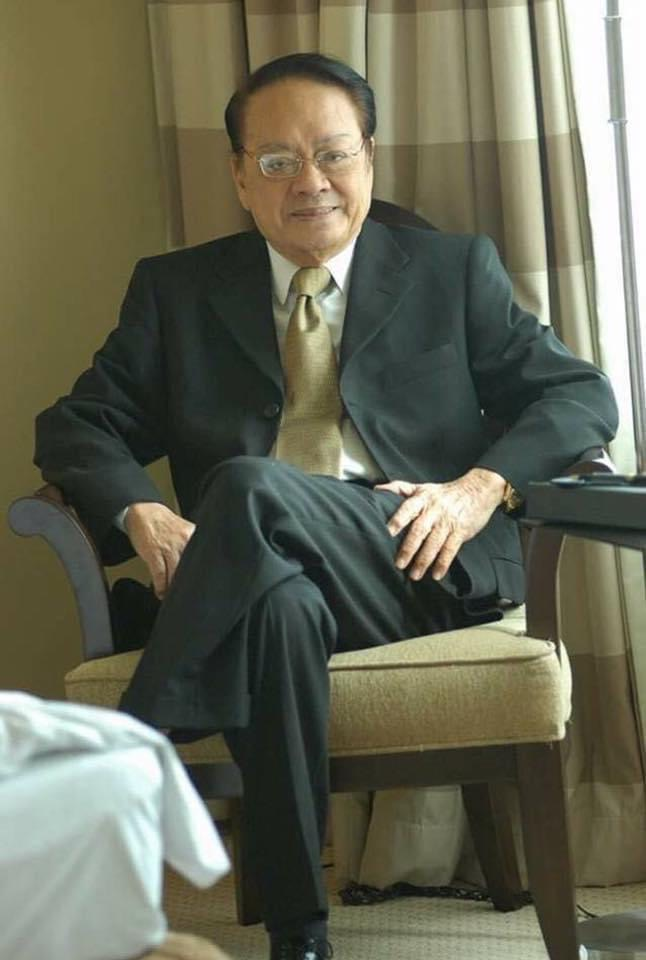
Napoleon G. Rama, Constitution commissioner, recipient of the Philippine Legion of Honor

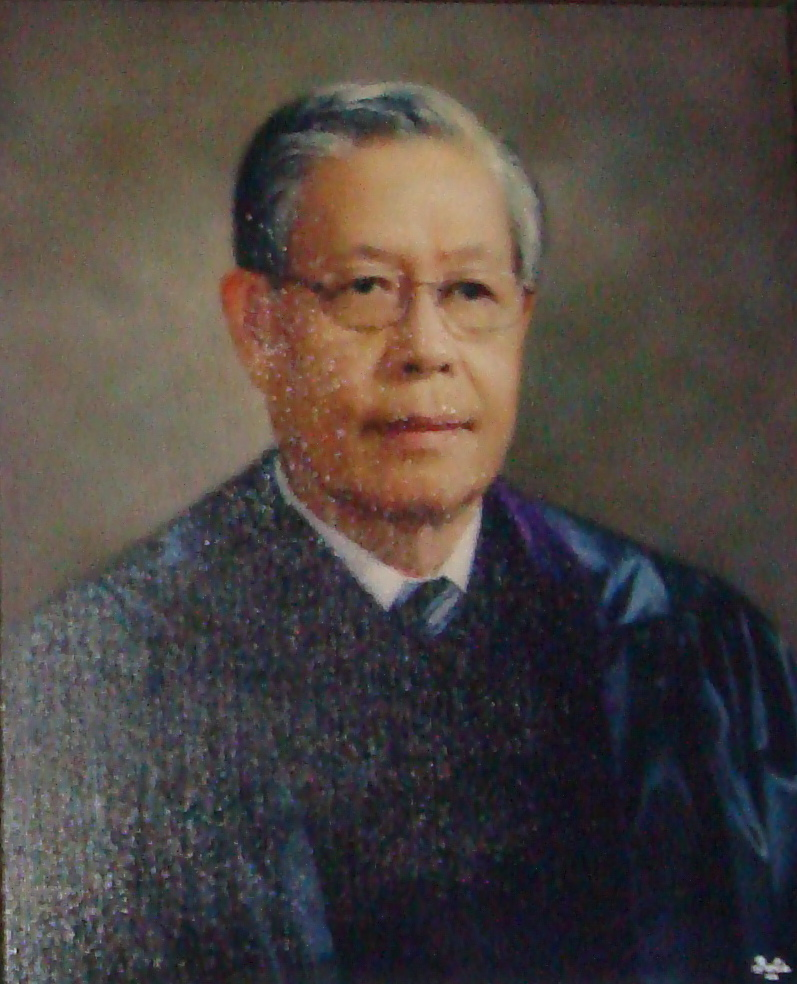
Hilario G. Davide, Jr., 20th chief justice of the Republic of the Philippines

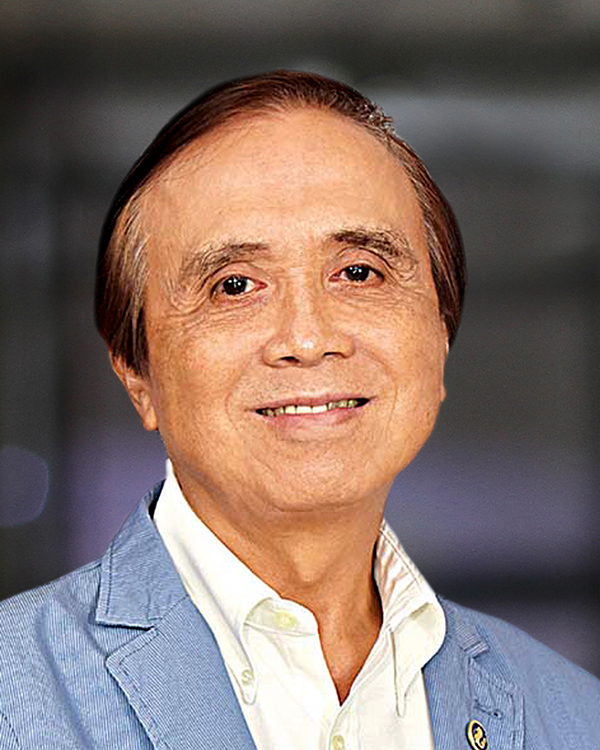
Ernesto Pernia, PhD, director-general of NEDA and the Secretary of Socioeconomic Planning

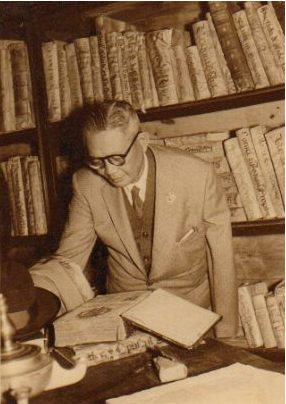
Antonio Abad, Filipino poet, fictionist, playwright and essayist

Resil Mojares, PhD, National Artist of the Philippines for Literature

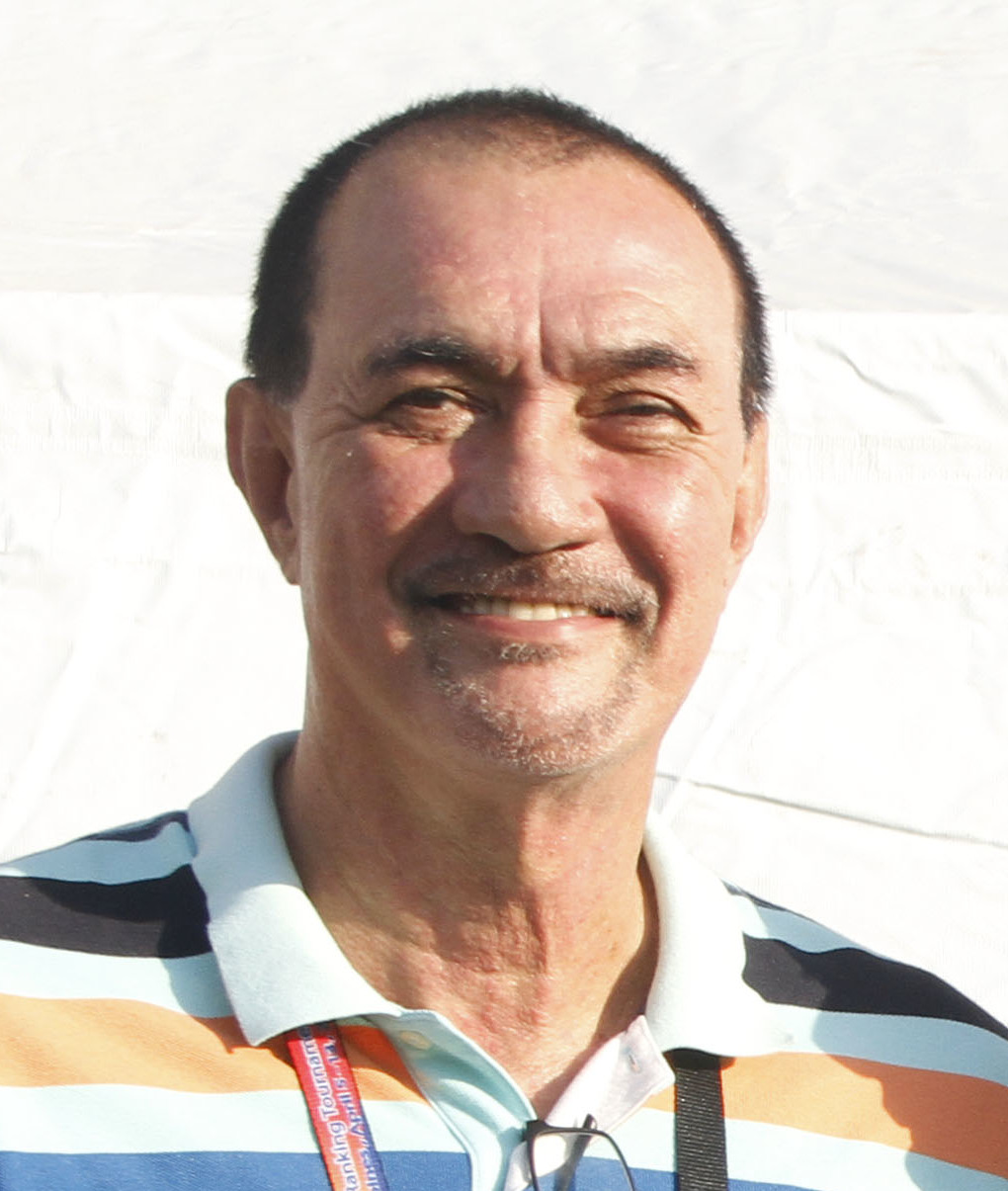
Ramon Fernandez, PBA Player, commissioner of the Philippine Sports Commission

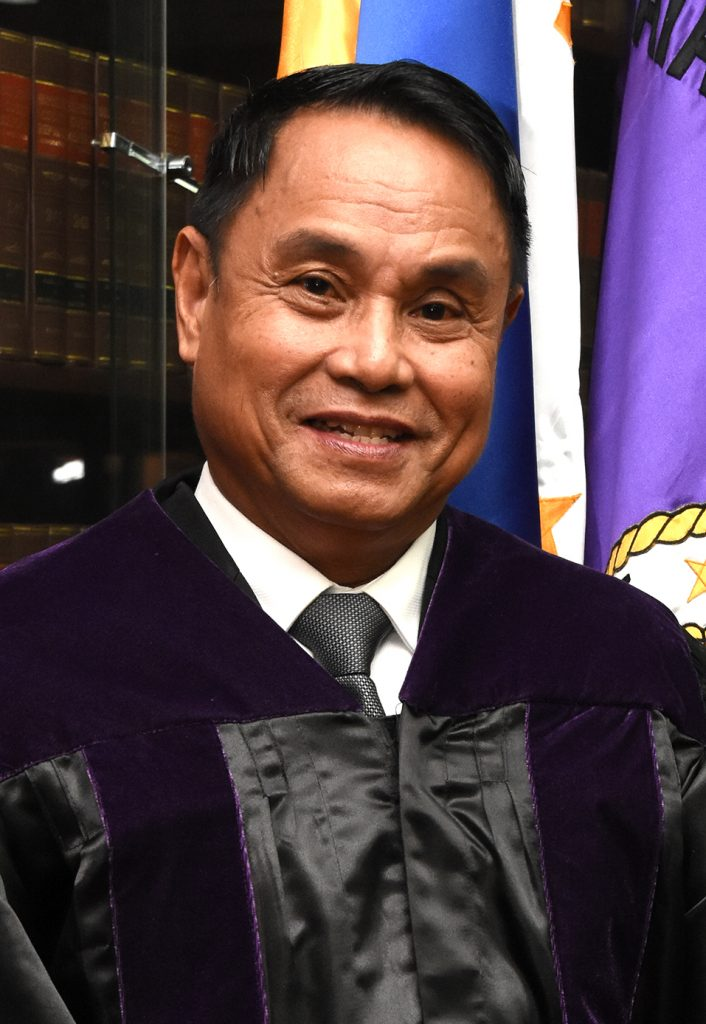
Edgardo Delos Santos, 186th associate justice of the Supreme Court of the Philippines

== See also ==
- University of San Carlos Museum
- University of San Carlos Stadium
