= Dalandanan, Valenzuela =

Barangay in Valenzuela, Philippines

Dalandanan
- Barangay
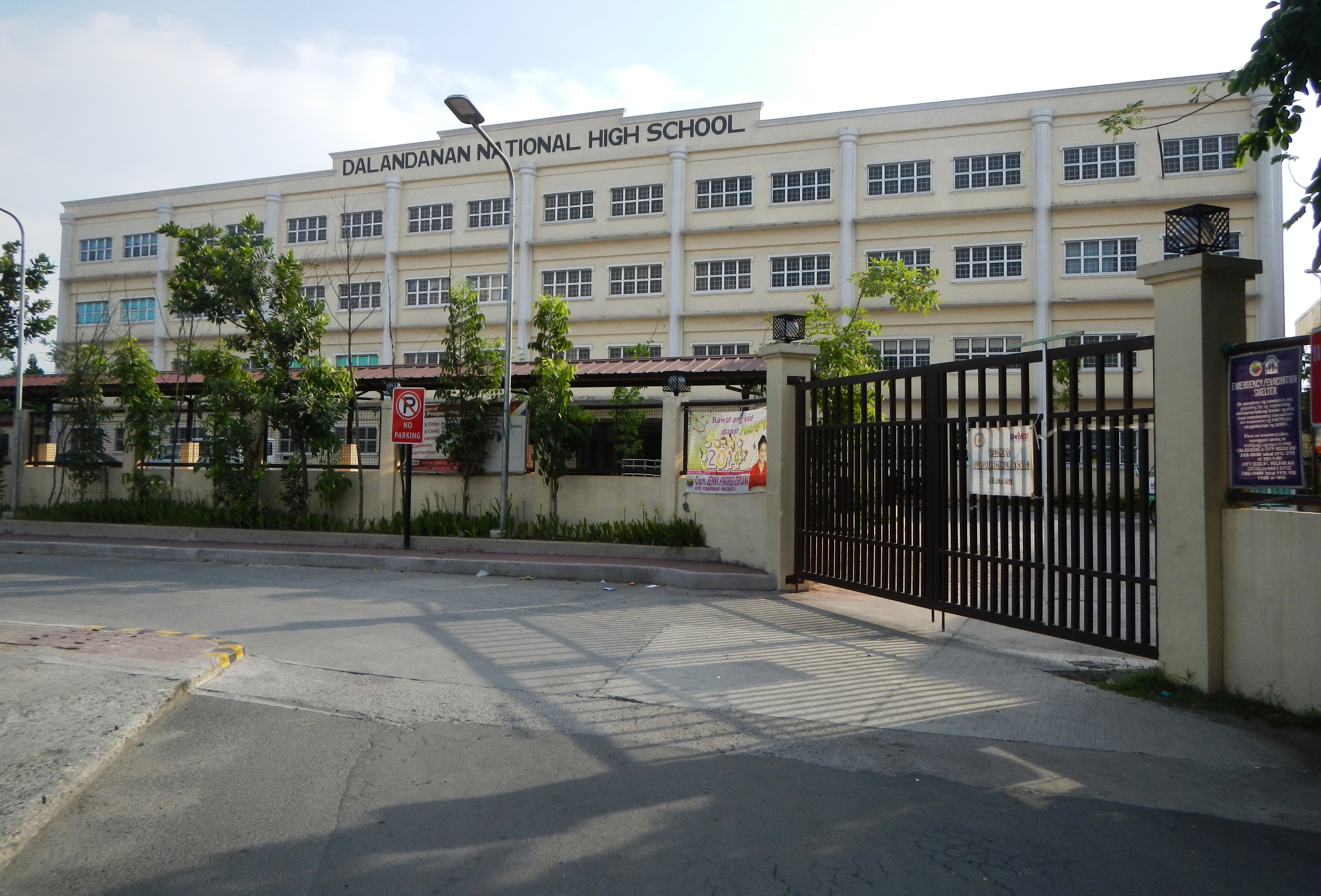
- Dalandanan National High School

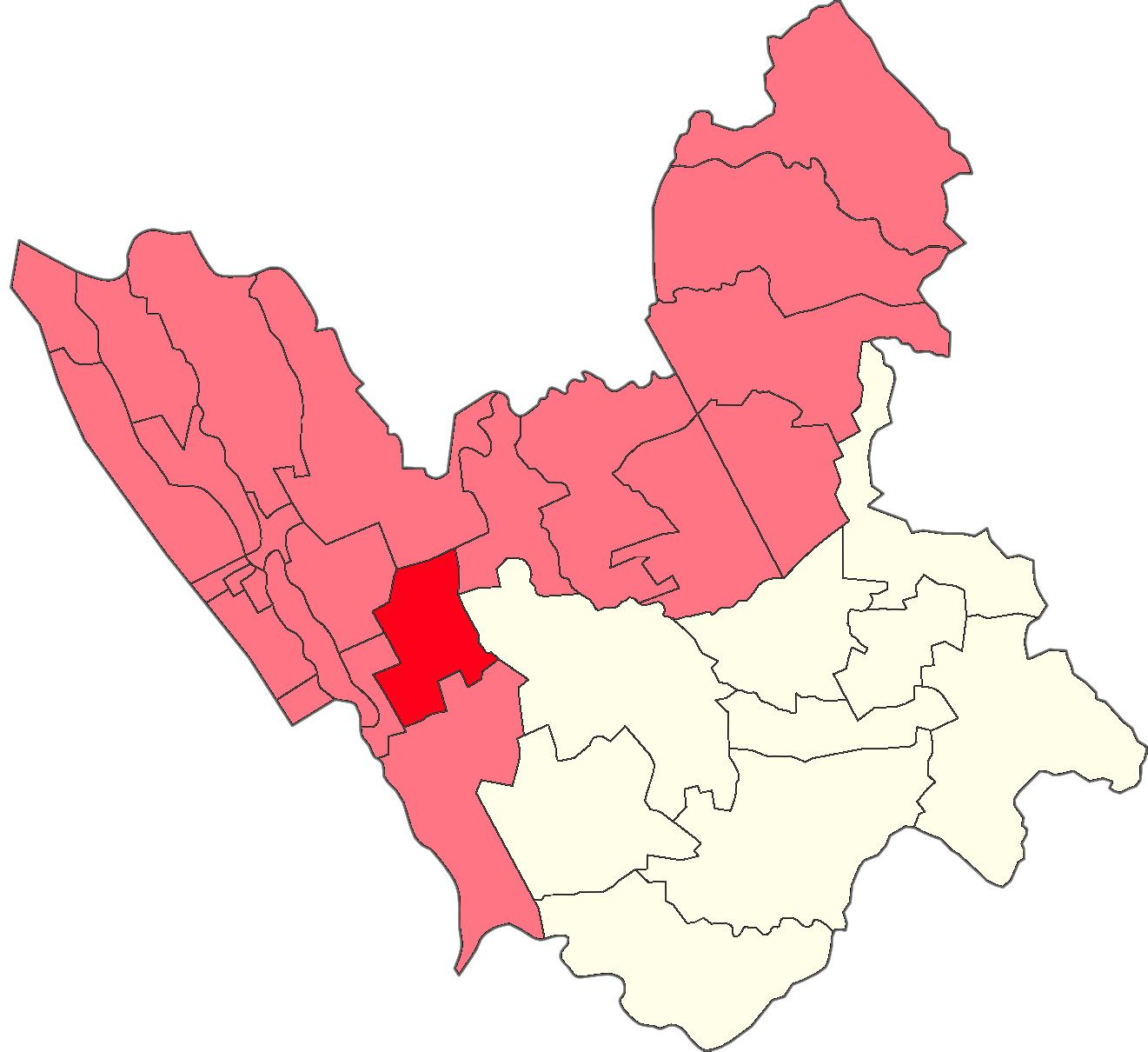
- Location within Valenzuela
- Interactive map of Dalandanan
- Coordinates: 14°42′15″N 120°57′41″E
- Country: Philippines
- Region: National Capital Region
- City: Valenzuela
- Congressional districts: Part of the 1st district of Valenzuela

Government
  - Barangay Chairman: Marvin Amboy Marcelo (2023)

Area
  - Total: 0.939 km^{2} (0.363 sq mi)

Population (2010)
  - Total: 17,348
  - Density: 18,500/km^{2} (47,800/sq mi)

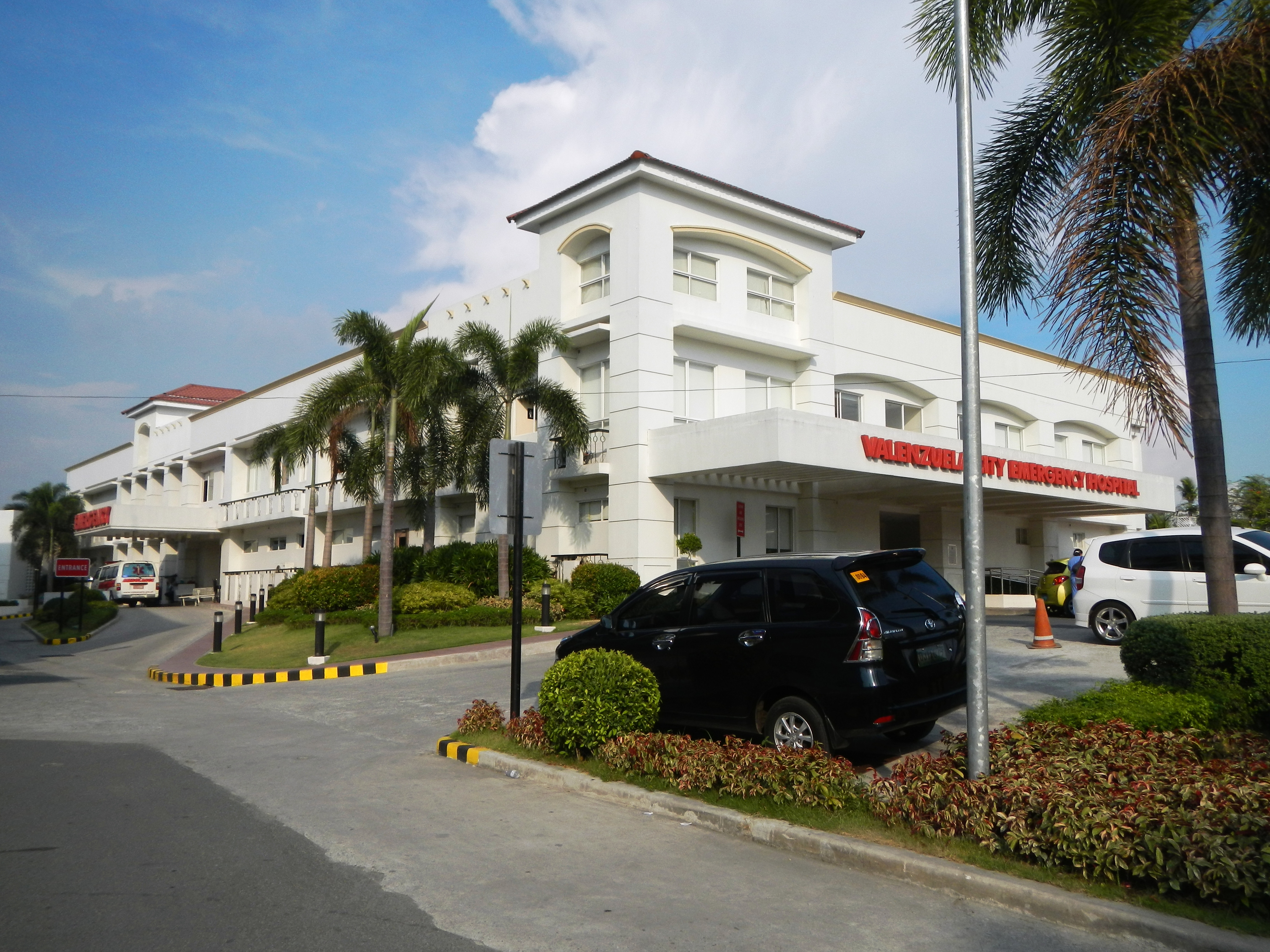
Valenzuela Emergency Hospital

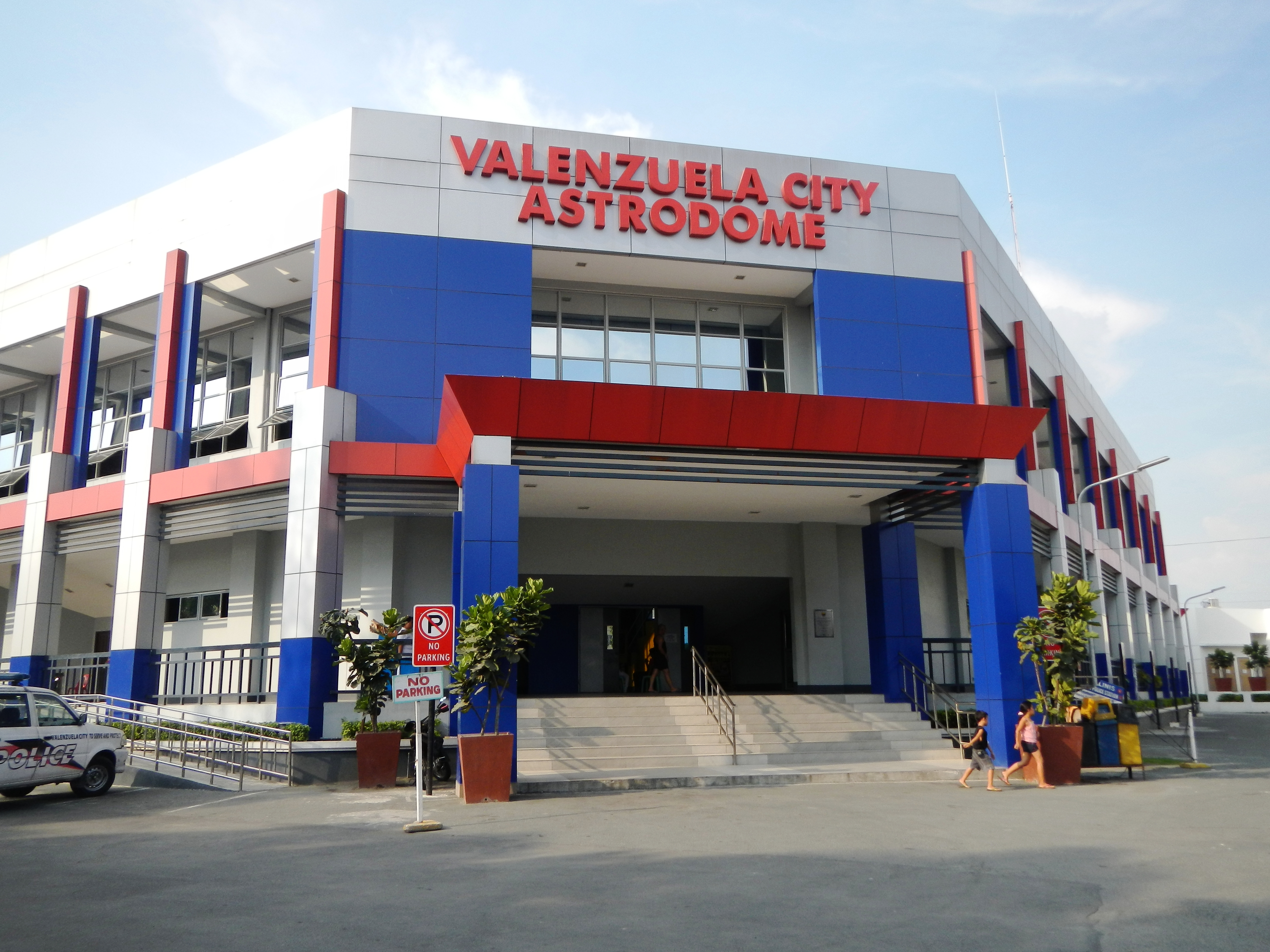
Valenzuela City Astrodome

Dalandanan is one of the highly developed barangays in Valenzuela, Metro Manila, Philippines. It was named after the impressive line of dalandan trees that used to distinguish the area.

Dalandanan houses the new Valenzuela City Astrodome, Valenzuela Emergency Hospital and Dialysis Center, and the former site of Valenzuela City Science High School, now known as Valenzuela City School of Mathematics and Science in the adjacent Barangay Malinta.

It boasts of different business industries like banking and finance (Bank of the Philippine Islands, BDO, Bank of Commerce, and Eastwest Bank), retail (Puregold Valenzuela, Wilcon Depot), pyrotechnic (Victory Fireworks), and biotech and pharmaceuticals (Scheele Laboratories).

The Iglesia ni Cristo Locale of Malinta chapel is also located along MacArthur Highway.

The now-defunct Manila-Dagupan Railway opened in 1892 and traversed the barrios of Marulas, Caruhatan, Malinta, Dalandanan and Malanday, with the station being in Dalandanan.

== Education ==
The barangay has 2 public educational facilities for elementary, and high school, which are Dalandanan Elementary School (DES) and Dalandanan National High School (DNHS), respectively.
