= Valenzuela City Academic Center for Excellence =

Library in Metro Manila, Philippines

- 14°41′32.5″N 120°57′56.2″E
- Location: Philippines
- Type: Public library
- Established: June 20, 2022
- Service area: Valenzuela, Metro Manila

Collection
- Size: 16,000 book titles

The Valenzuela City Academic Center for Excellence (ValACE) is a public library in Valenzuela, Metro Manila, Philippines.

== History ==
The Valenzuela City Academic Center for Excellence (ValACE) is an academic center and public library by the Valenzuela city government. The first and main ValACE was inaugurated on June 20, 2022 in Barangay Malinta under Mayor Rex Gatchalian. It opened in February 24, 2023.

In February 8, 2024, the construction of three more ValACEs in Barangays Gen. T. de Leon, Marulas, and Mapulang Lupa began.
