= 2025 Olongapo local elections =

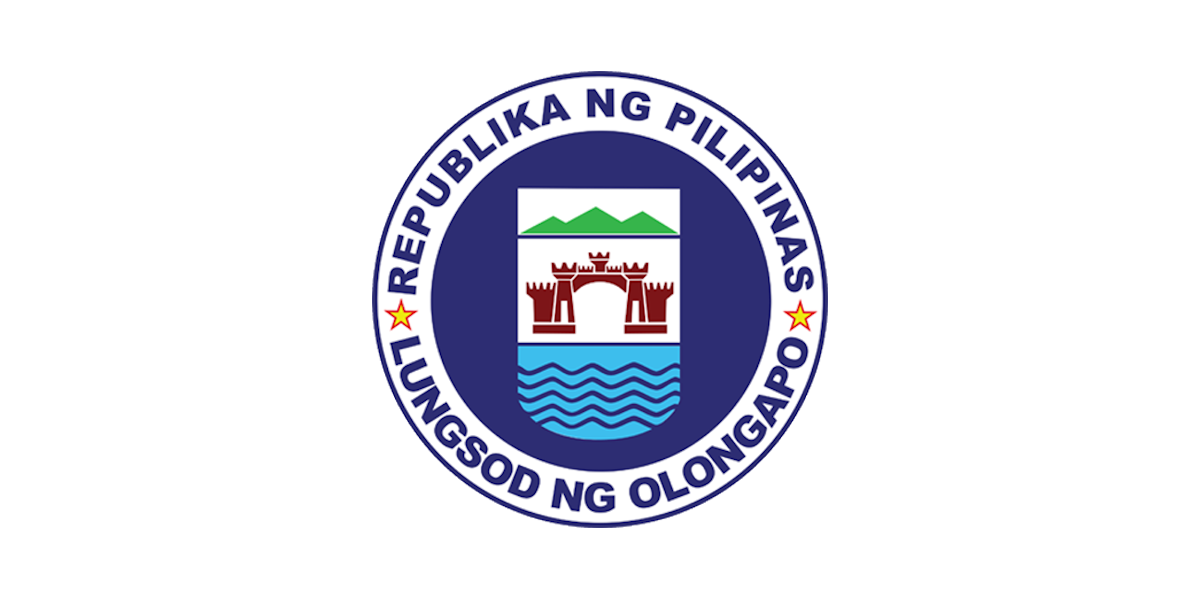
- May 12, 2025
- Mayoral election
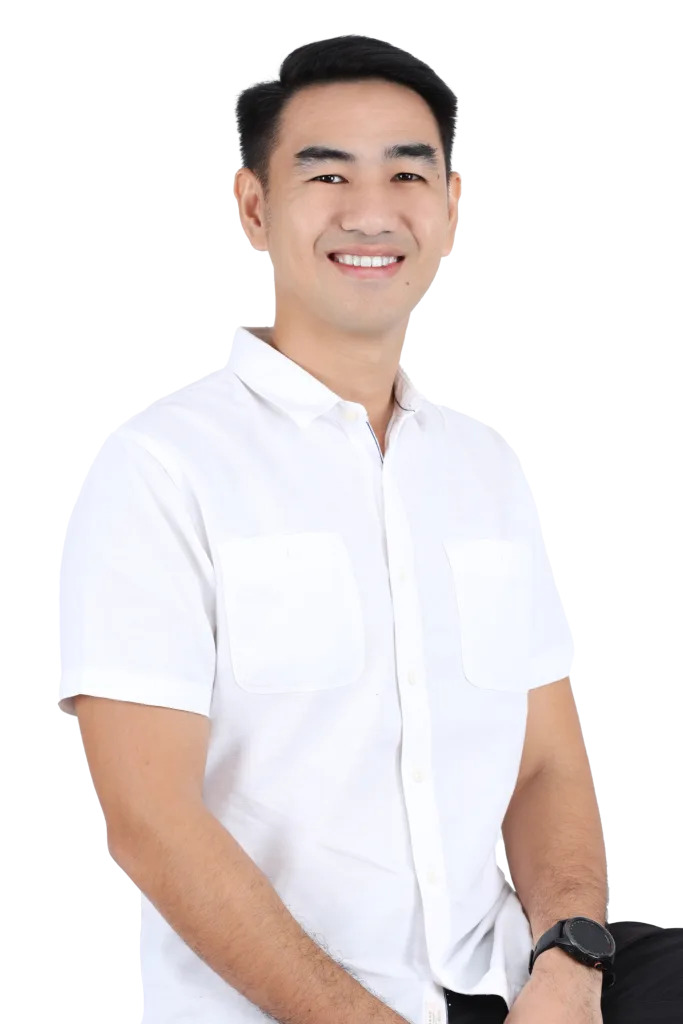
Candidate	Rolen Paulino Jr.	Jong Cortez	Echie Ponge
Party	Nacionalista	Independent	PFP
Running mate	Rodel Cerezo	Kaye Ann Legaspi	Gina Perez
Popular vote	35,179	23,402	21,776
Percentage	38.11	25.35	23.59
Mayor before election
Rolen Paulino Jr.
Nacionalista
Elected mayor
Rolen Paulino Jr.
Nacionalista
- Vice mayoral election
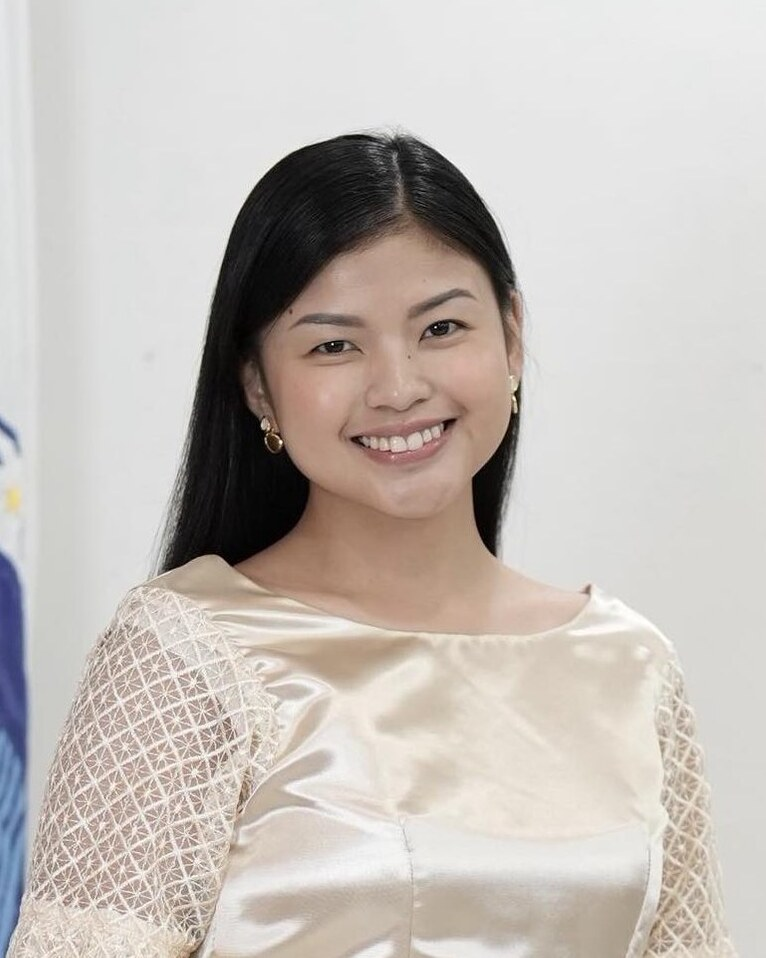
Candidate	Kaye Ann Legaspi	Rodel Cerezo
Party	Aksyon	Lakas
Popular vote	39,304	19,076
Percentage	43.66	21.19
Candidate	Lugie Lipumano	Gina Perez
Party	KNP	PFP
Popular vote	17,606	12,772
Percentage	19.56	14.19
Vice Mayor before election
Jong Cortez
Independent
Elected Vice Mayor
Kaye Ann Legaspi
Aksyon
- City Council election

10 out of 12 seats in the Olongapo City Council 7 seats needed for a majority
	First party	Second party
Party	Nacionalista	Lakas
Last election	6 seats, 40.04%	4 seats, 17.15%
Seats before	2 seats	4 seats
Seats won	3	3
Seat change	▲1	▼1
Popular vote	176,215	120,095
Percentage	25.17	17.15
	Third party	Fourth party
Party	PFP	PRP
Last election	0 seats, 5.85%	Did not participate
Seats before	0 seats	0 seats
Seats won	1	1
Seat change	▲1	▲1
Popular vote	106,806	60,876
Percentage	15.26	8.70

Local elections were held in Olongapo on May 12, 2025, as part of the 2025 Philippine general election. Olongapo voters will elect a mayor, a vice mayor, and 10 out of 12 councilors of the Olongapo City Council.

== Mayor ==
Incumbent Rolen Paulino Jr. (Nacionalista Party) is running for a third term. Paulino was elected with 54.30% of the vote in 2022.

=== Candidates ===
The following candidates are included in the ballot:

No.	Candidate	Party
1	Jong Cortez	Independent
2	Rolen Paulino Jr. (incumbent)	Nacionalista Party
3	Echie Ponge	Partido Federal ng Pilipinas
4	Arnold Vegafria	Partido Demokratiko Pilipino

=== Results ===
Candidate	Party	Votes	%
Rolen Paulino Jr. (incumbent)	Nacionalista Party	35,179	38.11
Jong Cortez	Independent	23,402	25.35
Echie Ponge	Partido Federal ng Pilipinas	21,776	23.59
Arnold Vegafria	Partido Demokratiko Pilipino	11,946	12.94
Total		92,303	100.00

== Vice mayor ==
Term-limited Jong Cortez (Independent) is running for mayor of Olongapo. Cortez was re-elected with 56.61% of the vote in 2022.

=== Candidates ===
The following candidates are included in the ballot:

No.	Candidate	Party
1	Rodel Cerezo	Lakas–CMD
2	Prudencio Jalandoni	Independent
3	Kaye Ann Legaspi	Aksyon Demokratiko
4	Lugie Lipumano	Katipunan ng Nagkakaisang Pilipino
5	Gina Perez	Partido Federal ng Pilipinas

=== Results ===
Candidate	Party	Votes	%
Kaye Ann Legaspi	Aksyon Demokratiko	39,304	43.66
Rodel Cerezo	Lakas–CMD	19,076	21.19
Lugie Lipumano	Katipunan ng Nagkakaisang Pilipino	17,606	19.56
Gina Perez	Partido Federal ng Pilipinas	12,772	14.19
Prudencio Jalandoni	Independent	1,260	1.40
Total		90,018	100.00

== City Council ==
The Olongapo City Council is composed of 12 councilors, 10 of whom are elected.

=== Retiring and term-limited councilors ===
The following councilors are retiring:

- Rodel Cerezo (Lakas–CMD), running for vice mayor of Olongapo.
- Kaye Ann Legaspi (Aksyon Demokratiko), running for vice mayor of Olongapo.
- Gina Perez (Partido Federal ng Pilipinas), running for vice mayor of Olongapo.

The following councilors are term-limited:

- Jerome Michael Bacay (Nacionalista Party)
- Lugie Lipumano (Katipunan ng Nagkakaisang Pilipino), running for vice mayor of Olongapo.

=== Overview ===
Party	Votes	%	Seats
Nacionalista Party	176,215	25.17	3
Lakas–CMD	120,095	17.15	3
Partido Federal ng Pilipinas	106,806	15.26	1
Partido Demokratiko Pilipino	73,844	10.55	0
People's Reform Party	60,876	8.70	1
Kilusang Bagong Lipunan	8,673	1.24	0
Independent	153,599	21.94	2
Ex officio seats			2
Total	700,108	100.00	12

=== Candidates ===
The following candidates are included in the ballot:

No.	Candidate	Party
1	Jan Giuseppe Abarro	Partido Demokratiko Pilipino
2	Macky Alonzo	Partido Demokratiko Pilipino
3	Ying Anonat (incumbent)	Lakas–CMD
4	Donald Aquino	Nacionalista Party
5	Noel Atienza	Nacionalista Party
6	Bien Azores	Independent
7	Gie Baloy	Independent
8	Ernelizar Batapa	Kilusang Bagong Lipunan
9	Ian Vegafia Bautista	Partido Demokratiko Pilipino
10	BJ Cajudo	Nacionalista Party
11	Rowel Catigawan	Partido Federal ng Pilipinas
12	Rodolfo Catologan (incumbent)	Lakas–CMD
13	Cristina de Leon	Partido Demokratiko Pilipino
14	Benjamin John Defensor	People's Reform Party
15	Moises Du	Partido Federal ng Pilipinas
16	Jerome Ducos	Partido Demokratiko Pilipino
17	Jamiel Escalona (incumbent)	Lakas–CMD
18	Earl Escusa	Partido Demokratiko Pilipino
19	Edwin Esposo	Independent
20	Dong Galang	Partido Federal ng Pilipinas
21	Pocholo Galian	Partido Demokratiko Pilipino
22	Jack Gardon	Partido Federal ng Pilipinas
23	Erick Ison	Partido Demokratiko Pilipino
24	Lacbain Jason	Independent
25	Joy Macapagal	Partido Federal ng Pilipinas
26	Vic-Vic Magsaysay (incumbent)	People's Reform Party
27	Derrick Manuel	Partido Demokratiko Pilipino
28	Tet Marzan	Independent
29	DM Muega	Nacionalista Party
30	Tata Paulino (incumbent)	Nacionalista Party
31	Edwin Piano	Independent
32	Randy Sionzon	Nacionalista Party
33	Arnie Tamayo	Independent
34	Bhong Tocayon	Partido Demokratiko Pilipino
35	Cris Tooley Jr.	Independent

=== Results ===
Candidate	Party	Votes	%
Jamiel Escalona (incumbent)	Lakas–CMD	45,867	6.55
Vic-Vic Magsaysay (incumbent)	People's Reform Party	44,438	6.35
Tata Paulino (incumbent)	Nacionalista Party	44,139	6.30
Rodolfo Catologan (incumbent)	Lakas–CMD	40,936	5.85
Noel Atienza	Nacionalista Party	40,015	5.71
Tet Marzan	Independent	37,846	5.40
BJ Cajudo	Nacionalista Party	37,357	5.34
Gie Baloy	Independent	34,274	4.89
Ying Anonat (incumbent)	Lakas–CMD	33,292	4.75
Jack Gardon	Partido Federal ng Pilipinas	29,046	4.15
Edwin Esposo	Independent	27,737	3.96
Rowel Catigawan	Partido Federal ng Pilipinas	23,862	3.41
Joy Macapagal	Partido Federal ng Pilipinas	22,785	3.25
Donald Aquino	Nacionalista Party	22,124	3.16
Dong Galang	Partido Federal ng Pilipinas	20,013	2.86
Lacbain Jason	Independent	19,647	2.81
Randy Sionzon	Nacionalista Party	17,630	2.52
Benjamin John Defensor	People's Reform Party	16,528	2.36
Arnie Tamayo	Independent	15,907	2.27
Ian Vegafia Bautista	Partido Demokratiko Pilipino	15,751	2.25
DM Muega	Nacionalista Party	14,950	2.14
Moises Du	Partido Federal ng Pilipinas	11,120	1.59
Macky Alonzo	Partido Demokratiko Pilipino	10,570	1.51
Edwin Piano	Independent	9,567	1.37
Ernelizar Batapa	Kilusang Bagong Lipunan	8,673	1.24
Jerome Ducos	Partido Demokratiko Pilipino	8,650	1.24
Earl Escusa	Partido Demokratiko Pilipino	7,213	1.03
Cristina de Leon	Partido Demokratiko Pilipino	6,528	0.93
Derrick Manuel	Partido Demokratiko Pilipino	6,096	0.87
Jan Guiseppe Abarro	Partido Demokratiko Pilipino	6,030	0.86
Bien Azores	Independent	4,929	0.70
Erick Ison	Partido Demokratiko Pilipino	4,500	0.64
Pocholo Galian	Partido Demokratiko Pilipino	4,297	0.61
Bhong Tocayon	Partido Demokratiko Pilipino	4,209	0.60
Cris Tooley Jr.	Independent	3,692	0.53
Total		700,218	100.00
