= Raul Roco 2004 presidential campaign =

2004 presidential campaign of Raul Roco

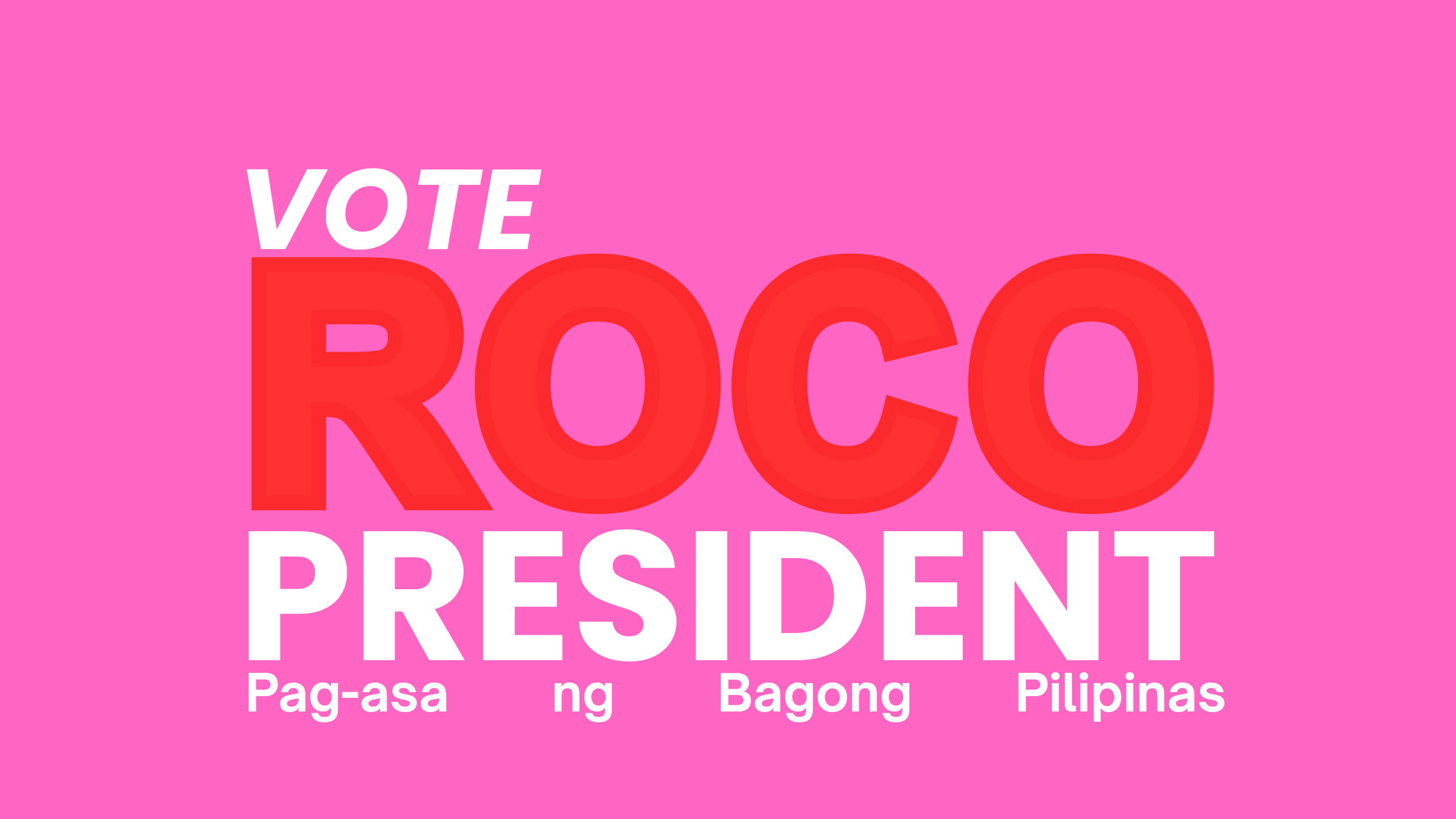
- Campaign: 2004 Philippine presidential election
- Candidate: Raul Roco; Secretary of the Department of Education (2001–2002); Senator (1992–2001); Herminio Aquino; Vice Governor of Tarlac (1998–2001)
- Affiliation: Aksyon Demokratiko; PROMDI; Partido Reporma-Lapiang Manggagawa
- Status: Official launch: December 2003; Lost election counting: May 24, 2004
- Key people: Dr. Jaime Galvez-Tan (campaign manager)
- Slogan(s): Ang bagong Pilipinas; Pag-asa ng bagong Pilipinas
- Chant: Roco!

The 2004 presidential campaign of Raul Roco was launched when he filed his certificate of candidacy on December 30, 2003. This was Roco's second attempt to run for the presidency, having previously ran in the 1998 presidential election.

== Pre-election ==
By mid-2003, President Gloria Macapagal Arroyo was poised to run for president in 2004 elections. Raul Roco was offered by Arroyo to be his running mate, but he declined, and insisted her to run as his vice president instead.

In selecting a running-mate, after calling out Arroyo, Roco had also considered former Cebu governor Lito Osmeña, Senators Noli de Castro, Loren Legarda and Manny Villar, and Metro Manila Development Authority chairman Bayani Fernando as his running mate. However, by November 30, 2003, he selected former Tarlac Vice Governor Hermie Aquino as his running mate.

He also revealed the party's Agenda of Hope on December 1, 2003.

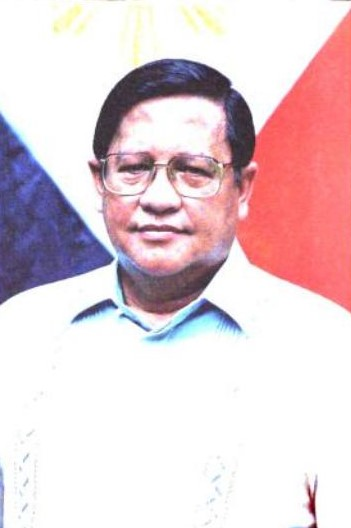
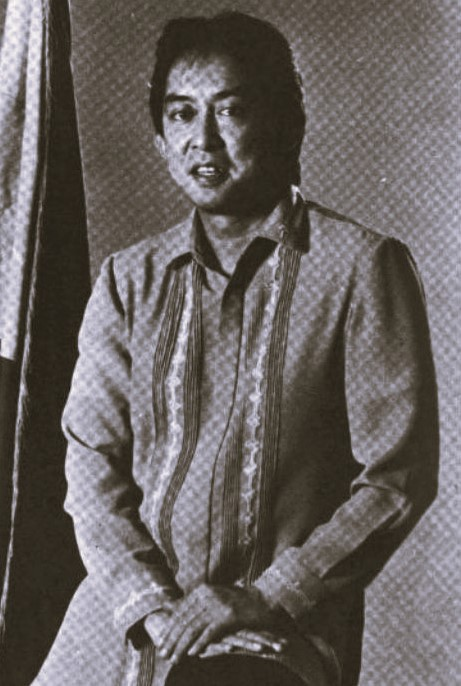
Aksyon nominees Raul Roco (left), Herminio "Hermie" Aquino (right)

== Senate slate ==
During the December 1 convention, Aksyon had considered 19 personalities for their senatorial ticket:

- 1998 presidential candidate Rene de Villa,
- former DOTC secretaries Josie Lichauco and Oscar Orbos,
- then-incumbent Senator Rodolfo Biazon,
- former Pasay congresswoman Lorna Verano-Yap,
- former agriculture secretary Leonardo Montemayor,
- police Chief Superintendent Romeo Maganto,
- former assemblyman Emil Ong,
- former solicitor general Frank Chavez,
- bowling champion Bong Coo,
- retired Gen. Rodolfo Gutang,
- Lanao del Sur congressman Dimaporo Ramos,
- Sulu congressman Arden Anni,
- Misamis Oriental Congressman Oscar Moreno,
- economist and 2001 senatorial candidate Winnie Monsod,
- broadcasters Pia Cayetano, Jay Sonza and Melanio "Batas" Mauricio,
- and Christy Ramos, daughter of former President Fidel Ramos.

Roco's Aksyon forged an alliance with de Villa's Partido Reporma, and Lito Osmeña's PROMDI to form their Alyansa ng Pag-asa slate. However, the final senate slate was reduced into only, seven with Coo, blind lawyer Nicanor Gatmaytan Jr., Nueva Ecija politician Eduardo Nonato Joson, Mauricio, Sonza, and former bureaucrat Perfecto Yasay selected in the slate, along with the inclusion of Chavez from Reporma.

The slate was nicknamed JC JC GaBaY, with J for Jay Sonza, C for Chavez, J for Joson, C for Coo, Ga for Gatmaytan, Ba for Batas Mauricio, and Y for Yasay.

Name	Party	Occupation	Elected
Francisco Chavez	Reporma	Former Solicitor General	No
Bong Coo	Aksyon	Former athlete	No
Nicanor Gatmaytan Jr.	Aksyon	Lawyer	No
Eduardo Nonato Joson	Aksyon	Former Governor of Nueva Ecija	No
Melanio "Batas" Mauricio	Aksyon	Lawyer/TV personality	No
Jay Sonza	Aksyon	TV personality	No
Perfecto Yasay	Aksyon	Former bureaucrat	No

== Surveys and alliance support ==
Roco performed second to third in surveys, but due to his prostate cancer, he had to go overseas for treatment, affecting his campaign and survey showings. Unfortunately for him and the party, some of the supporters left his campaign, and insisted that he will not back out from the presidential race. The party had also feared vote-buying initiated by President Arroyo's Lakas–CMD.

== Result ==
Roco and the whole Alyansa slate lost the election, but he later called out Arroyo about her controversial election victory.

In August 2005, Roco died at the age of 63, succumbing to his prostate cancer.
