= Willie Ong =

Filipino cardiologist (born 1963)

- 許偉利
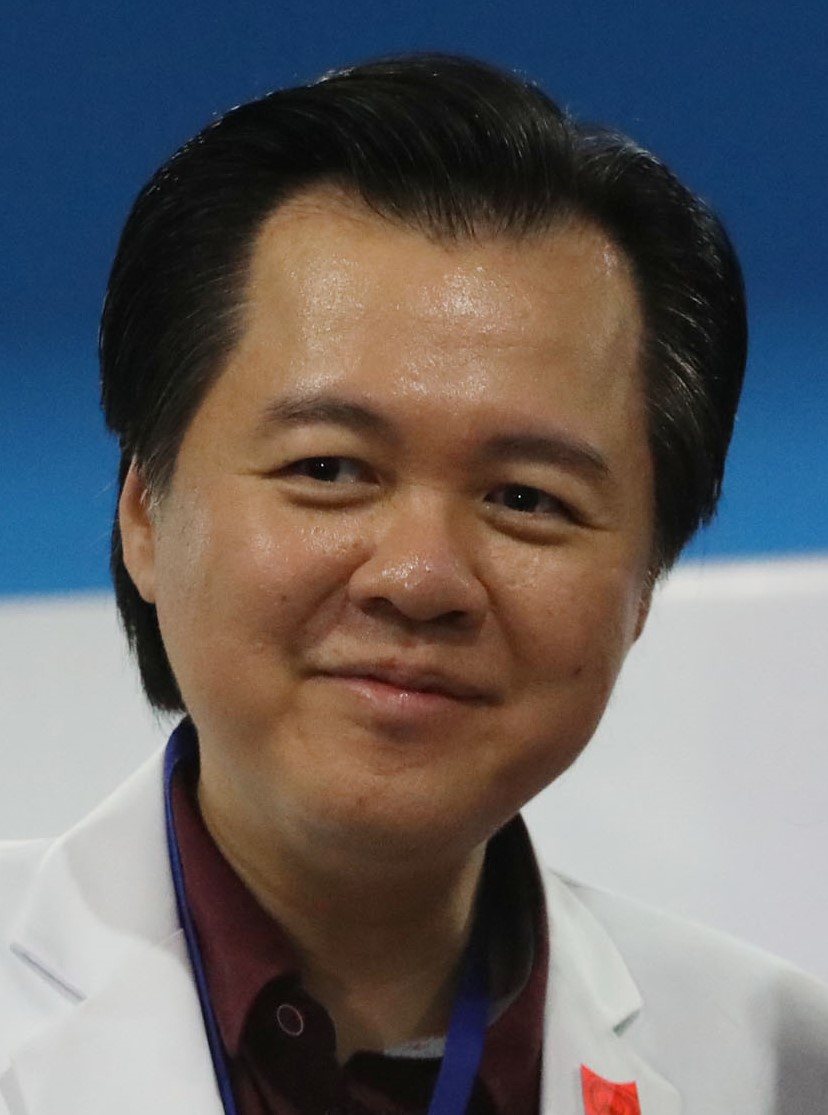
- Ong in 2018
- Born: Willie Tan Ong; October 24, 1963 (age 63); Manila, Philippines
- Education: University of the Philippines Diliman (BS); De La Salle Medical and Health Sciences Institute (M.D); University of the Philippines Manila (M.P.H)
- Occupations: Cardiologist; internist; writer; vlogger
- Political party: Aksyon (2021–present)
- Other political affiliations: Lakas (2018–2021)
- Spouse: Anna Liza Ramoso (m. 1993)
- Children: 2

YouTube information
- Channel: Doc Willie Ong
- Years active: 2007–present
- Genre: Informative vlogging
- Subscribers: 10 million
- Views: 1.70 billion
- Last updated: September 29, 2026

Willie Tan Ong (Chinese: 許偉利; Pe̍h-ōe-jī: Khó͘ Úi-lī; pinyin: Xǔ Wěilì; born October 24, 1963) is a Filipino cardiologist, internist and media personality who rose to prominence for giving medical advice through his Facebook page and YouTube channel.

Ong was a candidate for the 2019 Philippine Senate election, largely capitalizing on his social media presence. He was a candidate for vice president in the 2022 Philippine presidential election as the running mate of former mayor of Manila Isko Moreno.

== Early life and education ==
Ong was born in Manila on October 24, 1963. His father, Ong Yong, was an immigrant from China who settled in the Philippines in 1922 and was an active charity worker who served as president of various civic organizations.

Ong attended Xavier School in San Juan, Metro Manila, and studied botany at the University of the Philippines Diliman. He earned his medical degree at the De La Salle Medical and Health Sciences Institute, which was then the College of Medicine of De La Salle University in 1992.

== Medical career ==
Ong completed his residency in internal medicine at Manila Doctors Hospital, where he was the chief resident. He then completed his fellowship in cardiology at the Philippine General Hospital, where he was the chief fellow. He also received the award for the highest academic performance when he earned his Masters in Public Health at the University of the Philippines Manila.

Ong has also authored books. His first publication was the Medicine Blue Book, which is often used by Filipino medical students and new doctors. He also wrote the Cardiology Blue Book, which is a guidebook for diagnosis and treatment of heart conditions. He has also worked as a consultant with the Department of Health from 2010 to 2014. Ong also established the Co Tec Tai Medical Museum in Pasay, named in honor of his father and reportedly the first medical museum in the Philippines.

== Media career ==
In 2005, Ong became part of RJTV where he produced his own television show. In 2008, he made appearances on ABS-CBN's Salamat Dok. He did not have a regular segment on the television show and only participated as a volunteer. He left Salamat Dok in October 2018 to pursue an electoral bid for the Senate in 2019. He also writes a column for Pilipino Star Ngayon and PM PangMasa sister publications of The Philippine Star. Ong was also a resident doctor and host at DZRH's public service program Docs on Call from 2009 to 2017.

=== Social media presence ===
Ong started maintaining an online presence when he set up a YouTube channel in 2007, where he posts videos providing health tips and medical explainers targeted to a general audience. As of November 2023, his YouTube channel "Doc Willie Ong" has 9.04 million subscribers, and is the 15th most subscribed YouTube channel in the Philippines.

According to Ong, he established his presence on Facebook in 2013 after confronting an impersonator who had created a fake page using his name and posted his articles. Ong found the impersonator and began meeting with him and others every week to discuss how to grow his Facebook following. Ong continued writing and posting his articles on Facebook, which he credited for helping him gain followers. Ong had 17 million Facebook followers as of November 2023.

== Political career ==
=== 2019 Senate bid ===
Ong launched a bid for the Senate in the 2019 Philippine elections. His electoral campaign had a focus on health issues, particularly on providing a "holistic approach to providing total health care", citing his status as the 'only doctor running for the Senate. Ong also expressed openness to introducing the death penalty for heinous crimes, lowering the minimum age of criminal responsibility, and adopting federalism as the form of government for the Philippines.

Running on the banner of the Lakas–CMD political party, Ong said he did not rely on campaign donations to "avoid being indebted to anyone". Instead he relied on his online presence on Facebook and YouTube where he has 9.7 million followers and 1 million subscribers respectively as of March 2019. His campaign was also backed by 23 other pages with over 800,000 followers and 28 groups with about 87,600 members on Facebook. According to Ong's wife, some of these presence were managed by Overseas Filipino Workers (OFWs) who volunteered to support Willie Ong's campaign. Ong was also backed by other social media pages which supported other candidates backed by President Rodrigo Duterte's administration such as Imee Marcos and Bong Go.

Ong also supported the Anakalusugan Party-list's election bid by appearing for two seconds in an advertisement supporting the organization. He did not win one of the 12 contested seats in the Senate, finishing 18th in the polls with 7.5 million votes. Ong later stated that he spent about ₱500,000 on his 2019 Senate campaign. The Commission on Elections also sought to count an additional ₱662,764 as an "in-kind contribution" for the advertisement. Counting only votes by OFWs, Ong ranked second behind Bato dela Rosa.

=== 2022 vice presidential campaign ===
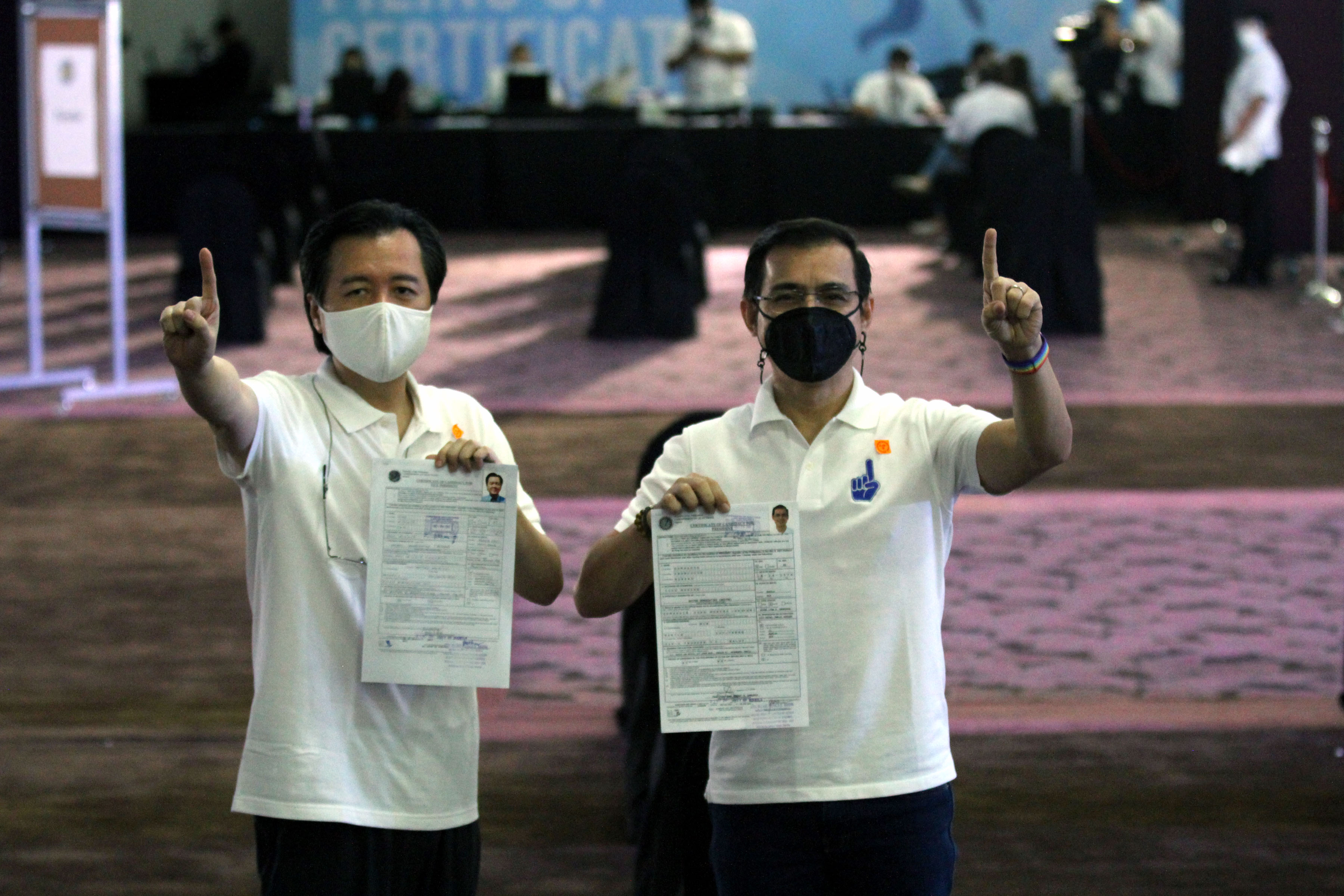
Ong (left) and Manila mayor Isko Moreno filing their certificates of candidacy for vice president and president respectively.

On September 21, 2021, it was announced that he will run for Vice President in 2022 as the running mate of Manila mayor Isko Moreno. Ong left Lakas–CMD a day later after his announcement to run for vice president. He joined Moreno's political party, Aksyon Demokratiko, on September 25. On May 9, 2022, Ong lost in his bid to Sara Duterte, placing fourth out of nine candidates. Ong conceded to Duterte on May 11.

=== 2025 Senate bid ===
Despite undergoing treatment for cancer in Singapore, Ong filed his certificate of candidacy for senator on October 3, 2024 for the 2025 Philippine elections through his wife, Anna Liza Ramoso. He said that he will not run a regular electoral campaign, stating that his senatorial campaign will be run with no funds and no connection with other political personalities in order for him to run "the cleanest way." On February 13, 2025, Ong announced his withdrawal from the Senate race to focus on his recovery. He later endorsed the candidacies of Bam Aquino and Imee Marcos for senator, both of whom later won the race.

== Personal life ==
Ong is married to Liza Ramoso, who is also a physician. They first met each other in 1988 while both were students at DLSU-EAC Medical School. They got married 5 years later. They have two daughters.

On September 14, 2024, Ong revealed that he had been diagnosed with sarcoma and was undergoing chemotherapy. He was also diagnosed with neutropenic sepsis two days later. With his brother's help, Ong had gone to Singapore to undergo treatment at Parkway East Hospital under oncologist Ang Peng Tiam. On October 8, after six weeks of treatment, Ong publicly revealed that his sarcoma has been reduced by 60%, stating that given the exceptional difficulty in treating sarcoma, "It's really a miracle".

== Electoral history ==
Electoral history of Willie Ong
Year	Office	Party	Votes received				Result
Year	Office	Party	Total	%	P.	Swing	Result
2019	Senator of the Philippines	Lakas–CMD	7,616,265	16.10%	18th	—N/a	Lost
2025	Senator of the Philippines	Aksyon	7,371,944	12.85%	27th	-3.25	Withdrawn
2022	Vice President of the Philippines	Aksyon	1,878,531	3.59%	4th	—N/a	Lost
