= Ernest Ramel =

Filipino politician and party official of Aksyon

Chairman of the Aksyon Demokratiko
- Incumbent
- Assumed office August 12, 2021
- Preceded by: Herminio Aquino

Secretary General of the Aksyon Demokratiko
- In office 2013–2021
- Preceded by: Herminio Aquino
- Succeeded by: Leon Flores III

Personal details
- Born: Ernesto M. Ramel, Jr.
- Party: Aksyon

Ernesto M. Ramel Jr. is a Filipino political party official who currently serves as chairman of Aksyon Demokratiko since August 12, 2021. Before serving as Aksyon's chairman, he formerly served as its secretary-general.

== Profile ==
=== Party official of Aksyon ===
Ramel served as executive director, and later from 2013 as secretary-general of Aksyon Demokratiko. After the death of Herminio Aquino in 2021, Ramel was elected to replace Aquino's position, with Manila Mayor Isko Moreno elected as party president. In the campaign team of Moreno, Ramel was tapped as spokesperson for party-related and election issues.

=== Calling out Marcos' Php 203B estate tax ===
While in the middle of 2022 presidential elections, Ramel and Moreno's campaign manager Lito Banayo called out the Bureau of Internal Revenue (BIR) to collect the Php 203 billion unpaid estate tax of Bongbong Marcos, Moreno's opponent. He also stated that BIR sent letters to Marcos, and also called out the Presidential Commission on Good Government (PCGG) about the issue. BIR later confirmed that they send a demand letter to Marcos. Marcos camp later said that the case is still pending and only an "all-political" issue. Aksyon rejected those statement by the Marcos camp. Later, PCGG stated that the decision of the court was final and executory.
