= Isko Moreno 2022 presidential campaign =

Presidential campaign for the 2022 Philippine presidential elections

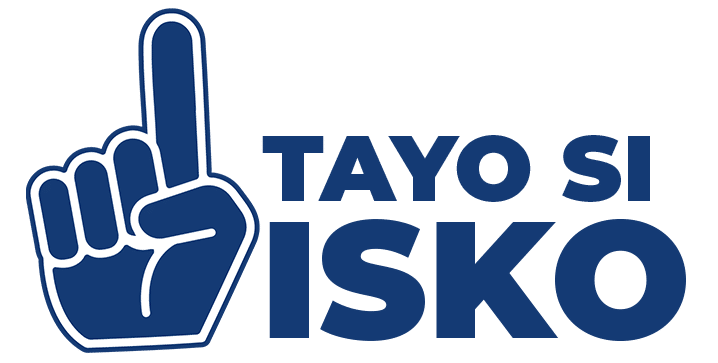
- Campaign: 2022 Philippine presidential election
- Candidate: Francisco "Isko Moreno" Domagoso; Mayor of Manila (2019–2022; 2025–present); Undersecretary of the Department of Social Welfare and Development (May 11 – October 11, 2018); Chairman of the Board and Chief Executive Officer of the North Luzon Railways Corporation (July 1 – October 27, 2017); Vice Mayor of Manila (2007–16); Councilor, 1st District of Manila (1998–2007); Willie Ong; Consultant for the Department of Health (2010–14)
- Affiliation: Aksyon Demokratiko; Asenso Manileño; Partido Panaghiusa; One Batangas; One Cebu (3rd District only)
- Status: Announcement: September 22, 2021; Filed candidacy: October 4, 2021; Official launch: February 8, 2022; Official end of campaign: May 7, 2022; Lost election: May 9, 2022; Conceded: May 10, 2022
- Headquarters: ECJ Building, Intramuros, Manila
- Key people: Lito Banayo (campaign manager and strategist); Raymond Burgos (communications head); Princess Abante (campaign spokesperson); Ernesto Isip Jr. (campaign spokesperson); Ernesto Ramel Jr. (spokesperson for party-related and election issues)
- Slogan(s): Tayo si Isko! (transl. We are Isko!); Bilis Kilos (transl. Act quick); Tunay Na Solusyon, Mabilis Umaksyon! (transl. Real solution, quick to take action!)
- Chant: Pilipinas, God First! Ikaw ang naISKO! (transl. You're the one I want!); 2 joints! Don't panic, ISKOrganic! (Don't panic, it's organic); Switch to Isko! Isigaw mo, Isko! (transl. Shout it, Isko!)

Website
- Official website

The 2022 presidential campaign of Isko Moreno began on September 22, 2021, when Isko Moreno announced his intention to run for the presidency in the 2022 Philippine presidential election. Isko Moreno has served as the mayor of Manila, the country's capital city, from June 30, 2019 to June 30, 2022.

Moreno ran on a platform highlighting his track record in Manila and promising to replicate his 3-year achievements as first-termed mayor on a national scale. His economic platform covers health, housing, education, infrastructure, tourism, agriculture, livelihood, digital transformation, good governance, and "smart governance". He also vowed to lower utility expenses and continue certain policies of then incumbent President Rodrigo Duterte such as infrastructure development and the campaign against illegal drugs while maintaining adherence to human rights.

Moreno lost the election by a wide margin, ultimately placing fourth out of ten candidates with 1,933,909 votes. Moreno later conceded to then presumptive president-elect Bongbong Marcos a day after the election. Had Moreno been elected, he would have been the second president from Manila and the third mayor to run for the presidency and win. His campaign has been observed to have been affected by his lack of political machinery, minimal media coverage, and insufficient counter to overwhelming disinformation against him.

== Background ==
Francisco Moreno Domagoso, more popularly known as Isko Moreno, started his career in the entertainment industry. Born and raised in the slums of Tondo, Manila, Isko Moreno first gained popularity as a cast member of the variety show That's Entertainment during the 1990s. In 1998, he entered politics at age 23 when he was elected as councilor, the youngest elected councilor in Manila's history at the time, for the 1st district of Manila and served for three consecutive terms. In 2007, he ran and was elected vice mayor of Manila under former mayor Alfredo Lim from 2007 to 2013 and Joseph Estrada from 2013 to 2016. He ran for a Senate seat in 2016 but was defeated. He returned to the political limelight in 2019 following his election as mayor of Manila, defeating Joseph Estrada, the then-incumbent mayor. Moreno is the youngest elected vice mayor and mayor in the history of Manila.

== Campaign ==
=== Announcement ===
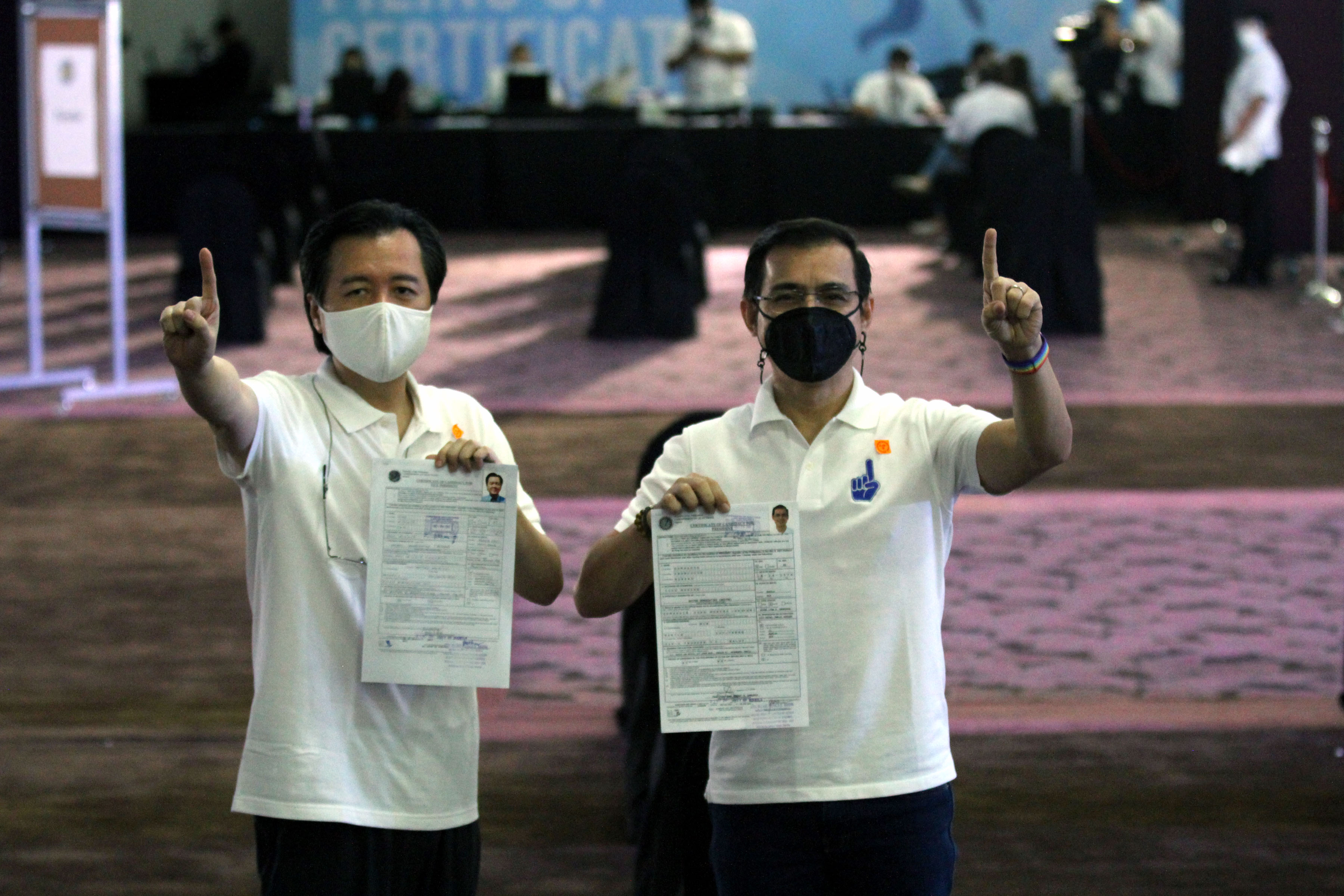
Moreno (right) and Ong (left) posing with the "God first" sign after they filed their COCs on October 4, 2021

Isko Moreno was reportedly to take his oath as a member of Aksyon Demokratiko, the party founded by Senator Raul Roco, in September 2021. This was after he resigned from the National Unity Party. However, this did not happen as an unexpectedly large number of people turned up on vaccination sites, particularly in Manila. Moreno was subsequently elected party president a week later. He later announced his presidential bid on September 22 with Dr. Willie Ong as his running mate. They filed their certificates of candidacy (COCs) on October 4.

According to Ong in an interview with Boy Abunda in April 2022, there was a supposed backdoor "unity talk" among Moreno, incumbent Vice President Leni Robredo and other aspirants before the filing of candidacy. The initial plan was for these camps to form a united front to avoid vote splitting against former senator Bongbong Marcos who also hinted to run for presidency, but the scheduled meeting did not push through. Moreno's camp initially believed that they came to an agreement with Robredo that Moreno would be the opposition standard bearer with Robredo supporting his bid. However, Robredo also announced her candidacy weeks later after Moreno's announcement, much to Moreno's surprise. Initially a frontrunner, Moreno's numbers in opinion polls noticeably dwindled following Robredo's announcement.

Moreno had expressed intention to retire in politics should he fail to get elected as president and would rather spend quality time with his family.

Official candidacy names as listed on the official ballot from the Commission on Elections

- #3. DOMAGOSO, ISKO MORENO
- #6. ONG, DOC WILLIE

==== Key officials ====
Lito Banayo, who previously served as the campaign managers of presidents Benigno Aquino III and Rodrigo Duterte during their respective presidential bids, was appointed as Moreno's campaign manager. Former Bases Conversion and Development Authority chairperson Vince Dizon was also initially reported to be part of Moreno's campaign team as deputy campaign manager, although this was later denied by Dizon. On October 13, 2022, it was announced that Moreno's long-time aide and chief of staff Cesar Chavez, a former Department of Transportation undersecretary and known ally of political bigwigs, amicably resigned from his post after he was offered a promotion from his previous job at DZRH and due to health concerns despite rumors of "infighting" between Banayo's team and Moreno's long-time supporters including Chavez. It was alleged that ever since Banayo's team came in, he and his team eased out Chavez and other long-time supporters in key meetings that led to Chavez resigning. However, the rumor was later denied by Chavez himself.

==== Running mate ====
According to Banayo, Grace Poe was their first choice as Moreno's running mate but Poe refused to run against Tito Sotto whom she has close familial ties with. Willie Ong, a cardiologist and media personality with large following, would later be selected as Moreno's running mate. Ong left Lakas–CMD a day later after his announcement to run for vice president. He joined Moreno's political party, Aksyon Demokratiko, on September 25.

=== Branding ===
Campaign banner

Moreno's main campaign colors are white and blue. The campaign's supporters adopted the moniker Iskonians and Iskolars, a wordplay on the word "scholars".

Moreno also popularized the hand gesture "2 joints" wherein one has to place one's thumb, forefinger, and middle finger together while the rest of the fingers are up in the air. In youth culture, the hand gesture is associated with cannabis smoking. Moreno however defended that the hand gestures were meant to indicate the letters "Y" and "O", which stands for "Yorme" (means "mayor" in Tagalog street slang, as well as Moreno's moniker) and "Ong", respectively, signifying his partnership with Willie Ong. The gesture originated when a young adult shouted the words "2 joints" and flashed the hand gesture at Moreno during one of their campaign sorties in Mindanao, to which Moreno responded by flashing back the gesture. The video of Moreno flashing the hand gesture became viral and popular, thus, the gesture was later used in his campaigns. The song Ganon Paren To by hip-hop artist Bugoy na Koykoy, who first popularized the term "2 joints" in the Philippines, was later used in Moreno's campaign rallies after securing permission.

Other songs used in Moreno's rallies include the modified version of the song Posible sung by Jimmy Antiporda (originally composed by Rico Blanco), Sige Lang by Quest, (Dying Inside) To Hold You by Timmy Thomas, and the songs Nais Ko by Smugglaz and Bassilyo, Ang Nais Ko'y Ikaw by Jimmy Bondoc, and Isigaw Mo, Isko by hip-hop artist YoungOne featuring Mickrophone, which were made specifically for the campaign. Supporters of Moreno also use the "God first" sign wherein the index finger is pointing upwards, a hand gesture associated with Moreno's Asenso Manileño local party.

Moreno described his campaign as populist and centrist, emphasizing his rags-to-riches story. He positioned himself as an "alternative candidate", portraying survey frontrunners Bongbong Marcos and Leni Robredo as embodiments of elitist politics that has excluded alternative candidates like him. Moreno capitalized on his 23 years in public service and track record as mayor as a response to critics saying he is "in a rush to be president". He further asserted that the issues in the country should be addressed "in a rush" as well in order to adapt to fast-changing times and that being young can be an advantage for the presidency, especially in the time of crisis where fast-moving developments call for energetic and quick leadership. Moreno also prided himself as the only candidate who acts and gets things done swiftly, citing his universally acclaimed accomplishments as mayor in just three years time on his first term. He considered himself as an "underdog" in the presidential race against the Marcos and Robredo camps who he called as political giants who have been dominating the political landscape in the country for years.

=== Rallies ===
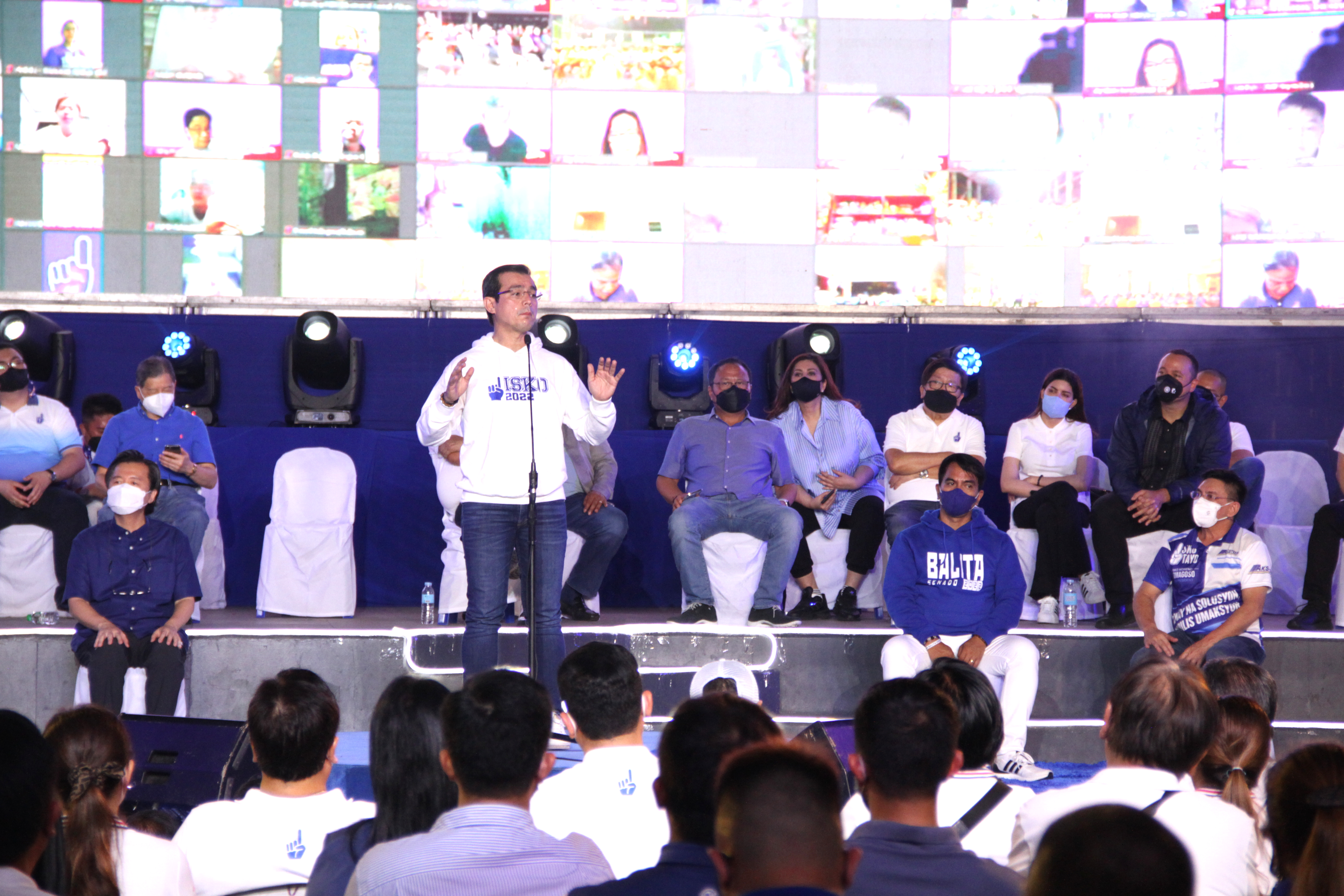
Isko Moreno speaking at his proclamation rally at the Bonifacio Shrine in Manila on February 8, 2022.

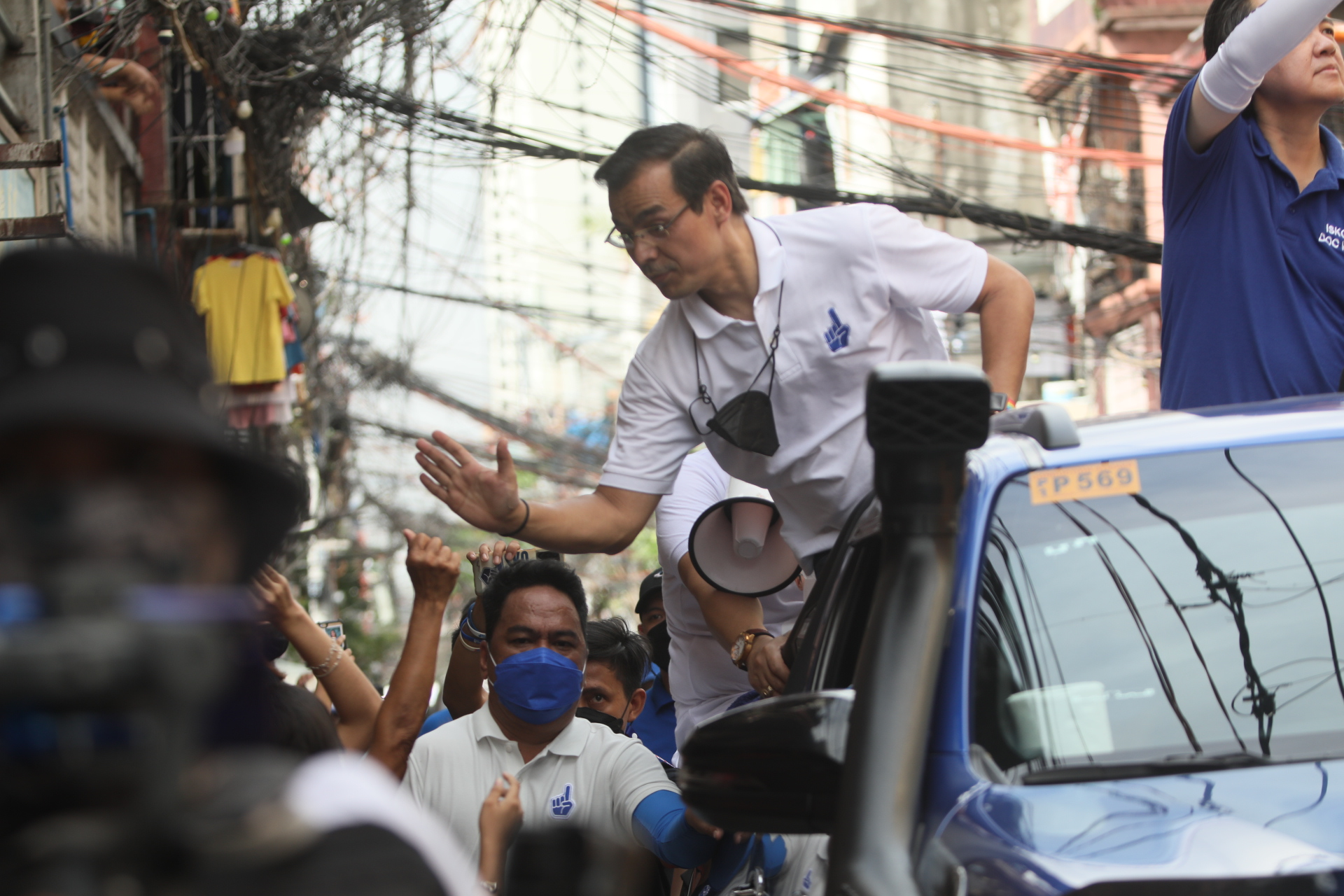
Moreno greeting crowds during a campaign convoy in Pasay, Metro Manila, on February 13.

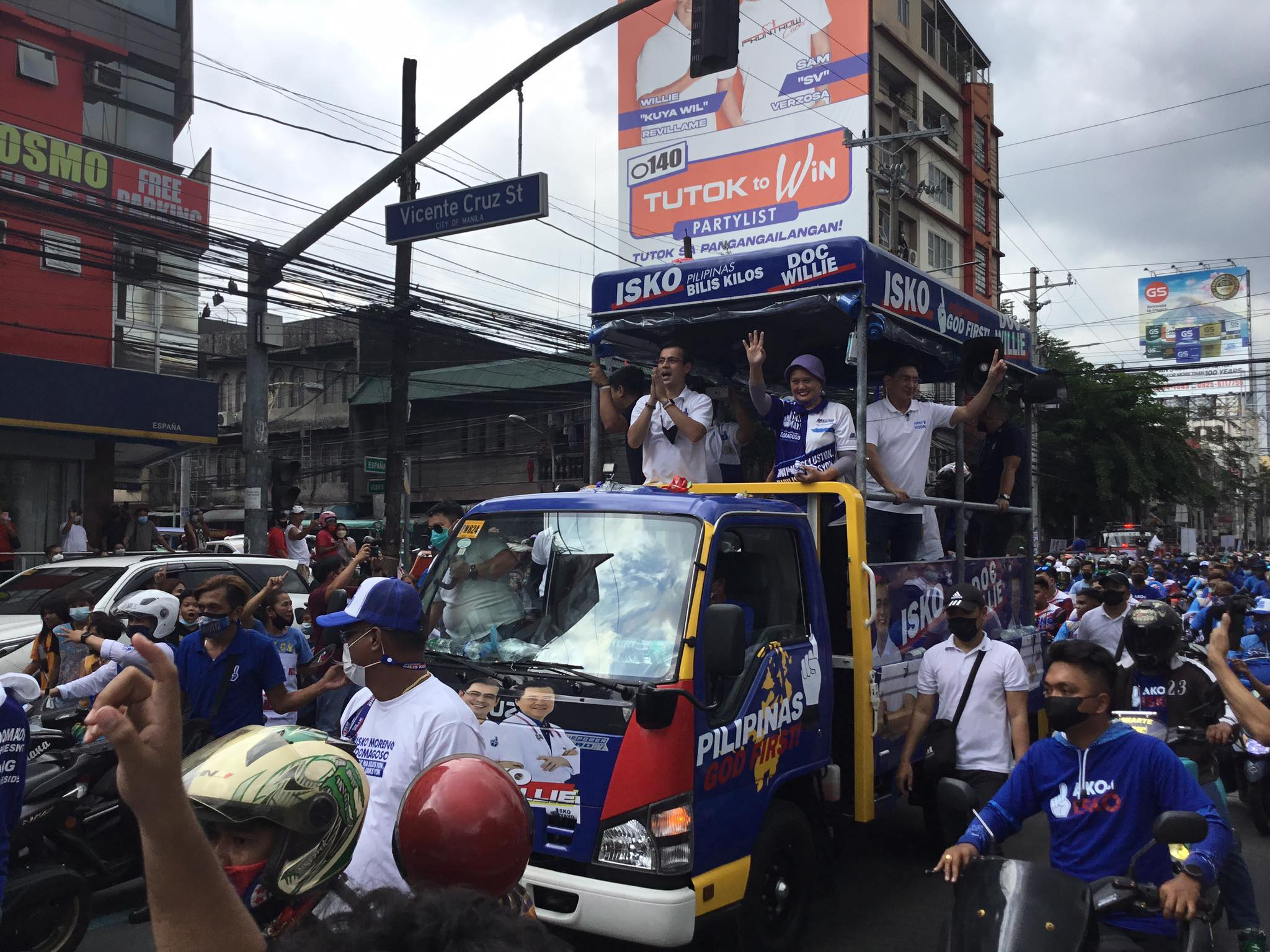
Moreno, together with senatorial bets Gutoc and Sison, campaigning in Manila during the opening of campaign, February 8, 2022.

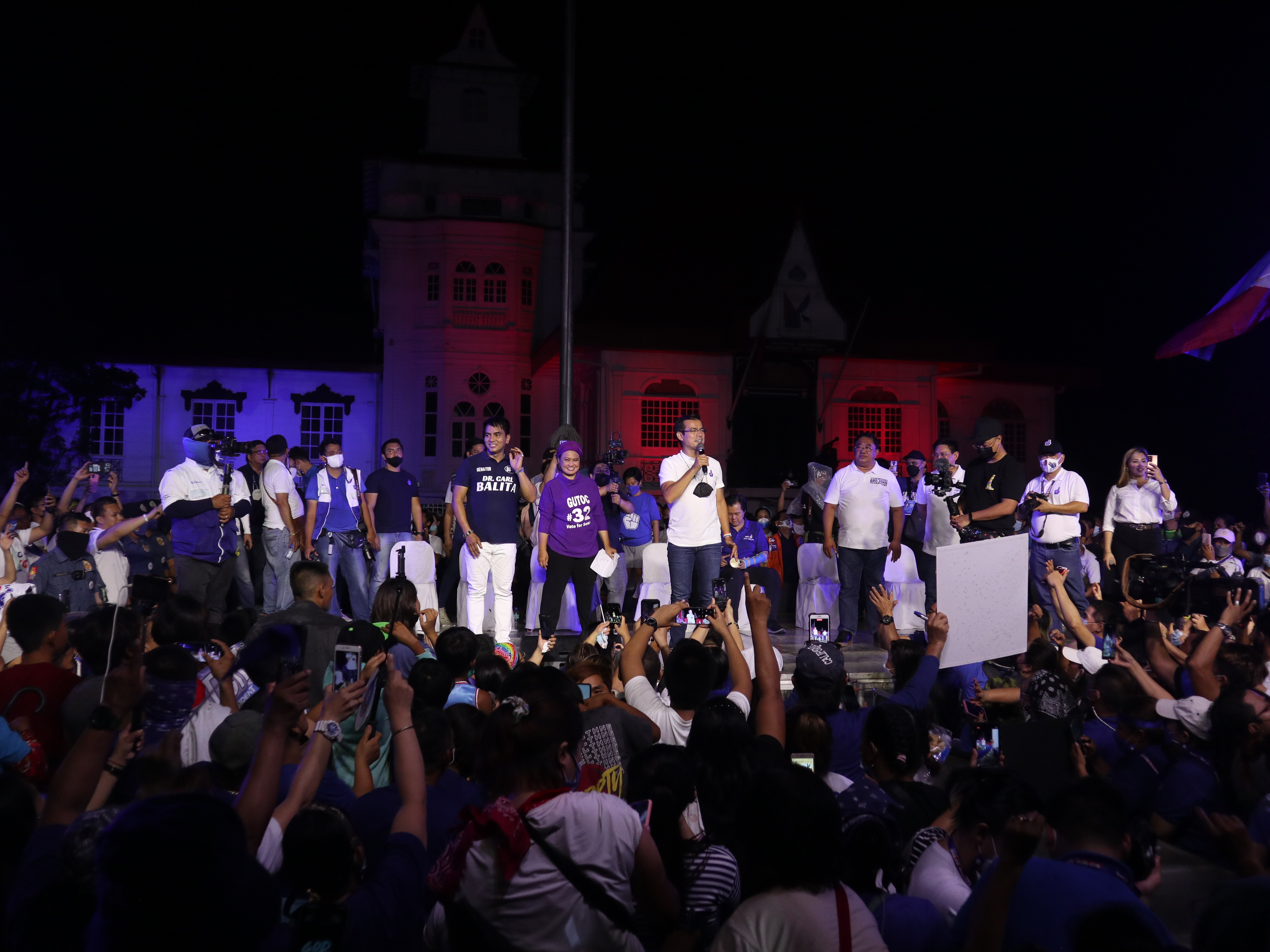
Moreno and his senatorial candidates on stage during their campaign in Aguinaldo Shrine.

On October 24, 2021, Moreno's supporters held a "blue wave caravan," which was joined by about 1,000 motorcycle riders and 100 vehicles. On November 15, 2021, Moreno held another motorcade in Metro Manila and Cebu. Organizers estimated about 5,000 motorcycle riders and 500 cars joined the event in Metro Manila and 500 participants in Cebu. Moreno's official campaign website was later launched on November 25, 2021, during a virtual meet-and-greet.

On February 8, 2022, Isko Moreno held his proclamation rally at the Kartilya ng Katipunan in Manila. He was joined by his running mate Ong and Aksyon's senatorial slate.

On February 20, 2022, Moreno started his campaign in Mindanao, beginning in the region of Bangsamoro. Campaign events in the region notably featured local officials pushing for a Moreno and Sara Duterte (ISSA) tandem. As a result, Ong was absent from the campaign activities, a decision that was made by their campaign manager Banayo stating that it might be "embarrassing" for Ong to go there due to the support for Duterte. Moreno's camp eventually distanced themselves from the purported tandem, affirming their support for Ong.

Moreno is the first candidate to meet with Bangsamoro Chief Minister Murad Ebrahim who welcomed him as an "incoming president" during a courtesy call As a result, this was reported as a sign that Ebrahim has endorsed Moreno's campaign. Ebrahim's party and the Moro Islamic Liberation Front later clarified that the Bangsamoro regional government has yet to formally endorse any candidate and that the "warm welcome" for Moreno was not tantamount to an endorsement. Ebrahim eventually endorsed Leni Robredo and Sara Duterte as president and vice president respectively.

Locations where Moreno held campaign rallies outside of Metro Manila during his 2022 presidential campaign.
Locations where Moreno held campaign rallies during his 2022 presidential campaign throughout Metro Manila.

List of Moreno's campaign rallies
Date	Venue	City/Municipality	Province	Ref.
Feb 8 (Proclamation rally)	Kartilya ng Katipunan	Manila	–	
Feb 9		–	Rizal	
Feb 10		–	Laguna	
Feb 11		Navotas	–	
Feb 11		Malabon	–	
Feb 12		Quezon City	–	
Feb 13		Pasay City	–	
Feb 14		Calbayog	Samar	
Feb 14		Catbalogan	Samar	
Feb 15		Allen	Northern Samar	
Feb 17		San Fernando	La Union	
Feb 17	South Ilocandia College of Arts and Technology	Aringay	La Union	
Feb 18		Dagupan	Pangasinan	
Feb 18		Sison	Pangasinan	
Feb 20		Cotabato City	Maguindanao	
Feb 20		Buluan	Maguindanao	
Feb 20		Kabacan	Cotabato	
Feb 21		Kidapawan	Cotabato	
Feb 22		Tacurong	Sultan Kudarat	
Feb 22		General Santos	South Cotabato	
Feb 23		–	South Cotabato	
Feb 24		Dasmariñas	Cavite	
Feb 25		General Trias	Cavite	
Mar 1		Malabon	–	
Mar 2		Samal	Bataan	
Mar 3		Nagtipunan	Quirino	
Mar 3	Philippine Normal University	Alicia	Isabela	
Mar 4		Santiago	Isabela	
Mar 4		Tuguegarao	Cagayan	
Mar 5		Tabuk	Kalinga	
Mar 8	Centro Mercato	Tarlac City	Tarlac	
Mar 10	Sta. Ines Gymnasium	Cabiao	Nueva Ecija	
Mar 10	Freedom Park	Cabanatuan	Nueva Ecija	
Mar 12		Baliuag	Bulacan	
Mar 14		Masbate City	Masbate	
Mar 15		–	Albay	
Mar 15		Sorsogon City	Sorsogon	
Mar 16		Silay	Negros Occidental	
Mar 16		Bacolod	Negros Occidental	
Mar 16		Victorias	Negros Occidental	
Mar 17		Kabankalan	Negros Occidental	
Mar 17		Hinoba-an	Negros Occidental	
Mar 17		Dumaguete	Negros Oriental	
Mar 18		Bacoor	Cavite	
Mar 18	Aguinaldo Shrine and Freedom Park	Kawit	Cavite	
Mar 21		Lucena	Quezon	
Mar 21		Candelaria	Quezon	
Mar 23		Santa Rosa	Laguna	
Mar 23		Biñan	Laguna	
Mar 23		San Pedro	Laguna	
Mar 24		Pulilan	Bulacan	
Mar 24		Hagonoy	Bulacan	
Mar 24	Malolos People's Park	Malolos	Bulacan	
Mar 25		San Juan	Batangas	
Mar 25		San Jose	Batangas	
Mar 25		Balete	Batangas	
Mar 25	Ayala Highway	Lipa	Batangas	
Mar 26		San Nicolas	Batangas	
Mar 26		Santa Teresita	Batangas	
Mar 26		Bauan	Batangas	
Mar 26	Public Market Open Area	Santo Tomas	Batangas	
Mar 27	Earnshaw Street	Manila	–	
Mar 28		Gingoog	Misamis Oriental	
Mar 28		Medina	Misamis Oriental	
Mar 28		Balingasag	Misamis Oriental	
Mar 28	Plaza Divisoria	Cagayan de Oro	Misamis Oriental	
Mar 29		Gitagum	Misamis Oriental	
Mar 29		Libertad	Misamis Oriental	
Mar 29		El Salvador	Misamis Oriental	
Mar 30	Iligan City Public Plaza	Iligan	Lanao del Norte	
Mar 31		Roxas	Oriental Mindoro	
Mar 31		Bongabong	Oriental Mindoro	
Mar 31		Bansud	Oriental Mindoro	
Mar 31		Calapan	Oriental Mindoro	
Apr 1		Mamburao	Occidental Mindoro	
Apr 1		San Jose	Occidental Mindoro	
Apr 6		Pagadian	Zamboanga del Sur	
Apr 6	Sunset Boulevard	Dipolog	Zamboanga del Norte	
Apr 6		Sindangan	Zamboanga del Norte	
Apr 7		Ipil	Zamboanga Sibugay	
Apr 7		Kabasalan	Zamboanga Sibugay	
Apr 7	Southern City Colleges	Zamboanga City	–	
Apr 8	Guadalupe Gym; Tinago Gym	Cebu City	Cebu	
Apr 8	Hoops Dome	Lapu-Lapu	Cebu	
Apr 9	Alodome	Aloguinsan	Cebu	
Apr 9	Toledo City Sports Center	Toledo	Cebu	
Apr 10	Maria Orosa Avenue corner Kalaw Avenue	Manila	–	
Apr 12		San Pedro	Laguna	
Apr 12		Muntinlupa	–	
Apr 13		Porac	Pampanga	
Apr 13		Angeles	Pampanga	
Apr 13		Mabalacat	Pampanga	
Apr 13		Magalang	Pampanga	
Apr 13	Bulaon Resettlement Area Covered Court	San Fernando	Pampanga	
Apr 18		Surigao City	Surigao del Norte	
Apr 18		Cabadbaran	Agusan del Norte	
Apr 18	Bayugan Central School	Bayugan	Agusan del Sur	
Apr 18	Guingona Park	Butuan	Agusan del Norte	
Apr 19		San Francisco	Agusan del Sur	
Apr 19		Prosperidad	Agusan del Sur	
Apr 20	Catigbian Gym	Catigbian	Bohol	
Apr 20		Carmen	Bohol	
Apr 20	Calape Cultural Center and Sports Complex	Calape	Bohol	
Apr 20	Tagbilaran Airport	Tagbilaran	Bohol	
Apr 21	Bagumbayan Covered Court	Teresa	Rizal	
Apr 21		Angono	Rizal	
Apr 21		Binangonan	Rizal	
Apr 21		Tanay	Rizal	
Apr 22	Police Station 4 corner G. de Jesus Street	Caloocan	–	
Apr 24		Carcar	Cebu	
Apr 25		Carles	Iloilo	
Apr 25		Pototan	Iloilo	
Apr 25	Binirayan Sports Complex	San Jose de Buenavista	Antique	
Apr 26		Kalibo	Aklan	
Apr 26		New Washington	Aklan	
Apr 26		Sapian	Capiz	
Apr 26	Villareal Stadium	Roxas City	Capiz	
Apr 26	Brgy. Salvacion Covered Court	Busuanga	Palawan	
Apr 27	San Miguel Capitol Gymnasium	Jordan	Guimaras	
Apr 27	La Paz Plaza	Iloilo City	Iloilo	
Apr 28	Binalbagan Municipal Plaza	Binalbagan	Negros Occidental	
Apr 28	Bacolod Public Plaza	Bacolod	Negros Occidental	
Apr 28	Valencia City Oval	Valencia	Bukidnon	
Apr 30	Lingayen Baywalk	Lingayen	Pangasinan	
Apr 30		Barili	Cebu	
Apr 30	Naga Boardwalk	Naga	Cebu	
May 1		Tanza	Cavite	
May 1		Indang	Cavite	
May 1		Naic	Cavite	
May 2	Kartilya ng Katipunan	Manila	–	
May 2	Ubay Sports Complex	Ubay	Bohol	
May 3	Danao City Boardwalk	Danao	Cebu	
May 4	Brgy. Mambaling Covered Court	Cebu City	Cebu	
May 4	3rd Avenue	Cebu City	Cebu	
May 5		Sogod	Southern Leyte	
May 5		Tacloban	Leyte	
May 6		Pasig	–	
May 7 (Miting de Avance)	Moriones Street	Tondo, Manila	–	

== Polling ==
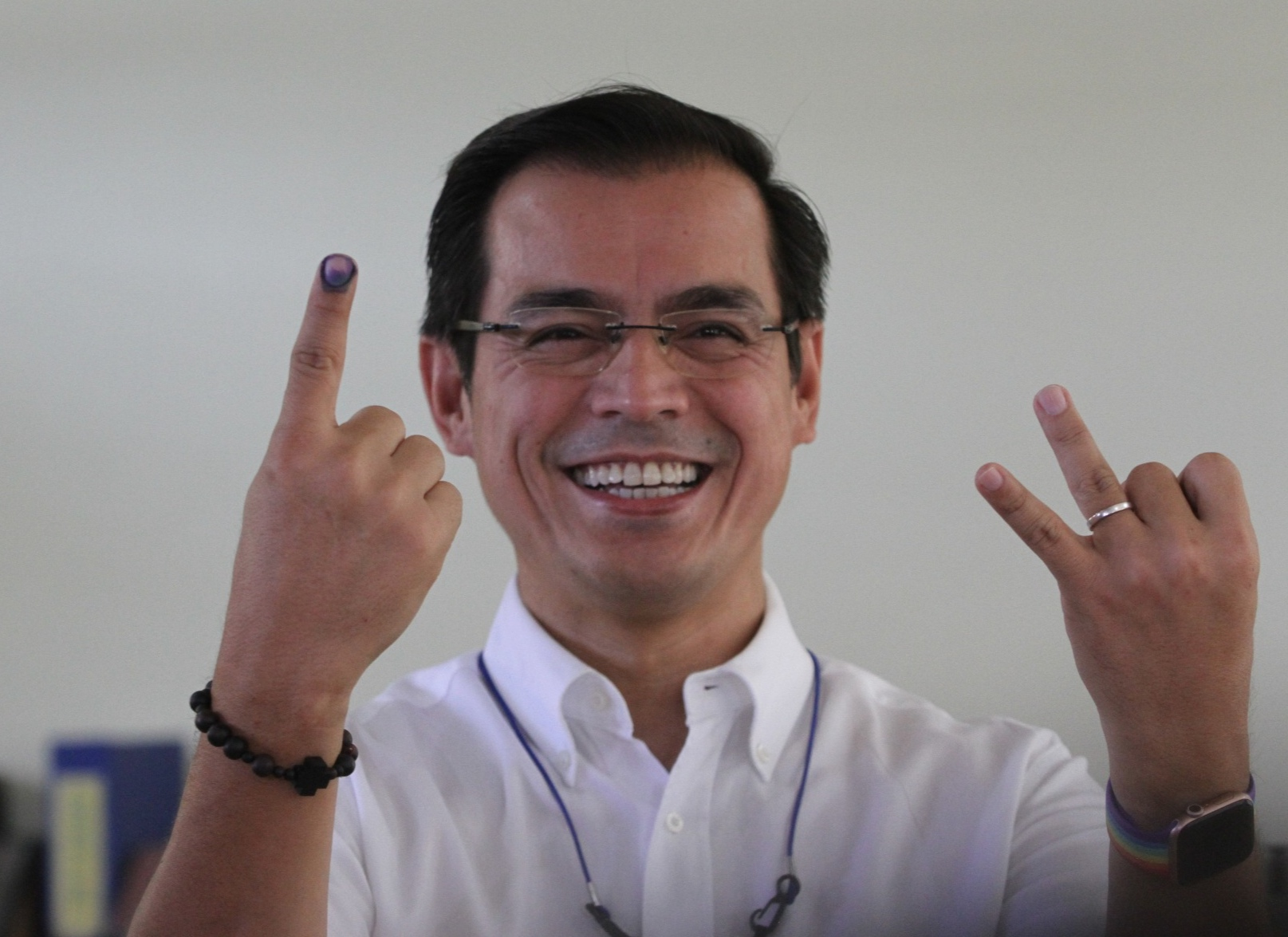
Moreno flashing the "God first" sign (right hand) and the "2 joints" sign (left hand) after casting his vote at Magat Salamat Elementary School in Tondo, Manila on May 9, 2022

Moreno had maintained his standing as the "top second choice" of voters based on surveys conducted by pollsters Pulse Asia, OCTA Research, and Manila Bulletin–Tangere months before the election.

== Senatorial slate ==
Moreno and Ong have endorsed the following candidates for the 2022 Philippine Senate election, thus who are part of their "senatorial slate" dubbed as the Team Bilis Kilos:

Candidate name and party	Position	Votes	Ranking	Elected
Carl Balita; Aksyon	Nurse; midwife; educator (Doctor of Education); entrepreneur; author; former radio personality (host of Radyo Negosyo at DZMM from 2001 to 2021)	3,700,067	30th	Lost
John Castriciones; PDP–Laban (Note: Guest candidate)	Lawyer; Former Agrarian Reform Secretary (December 2017 – October 2021); Undersecretary for Operations of the Department of the Interior and Local Government (July 1, 2016 – November 2017); Director of the Department of Transportation and Communications's Investigation, Security and Law Enforcement Service (2009–2010)	706,286	49th	Lost
Samira Gutoc; Aksyon	Civic leader; Member of the Bangsamoro Transition Commission (February 2017 – May 2017); Member of the Regional Legislative Assembly of the Autonomous Region in Muslim Mindanao (May 2012 – June 2013)	2,060,541	39th	Lost
Jopet Sison; Aksyon	Lawyer; Host of legal drama television program Ipaglaban Mo!; Former President of National Home Mortgage Finance Corporation (2005–2012); Former Assistant General Manager of National Housing Authority (2001–2005); Former Councilor of Quezon City for Fourth district (1992–1998); Former Barangay Kagawad of Pinagkaisahan, Quezon City (1989–1992)	2,189,006	38th	Lost

Noli de Castro, a former senator and vice president himself, was originally running for senator under Aksyon Demokratiko. However, he withdrew from the race just five days after filing his certificate of candidacy citing undisclosed personal reasons. He was replaced by Jopet Sison.

Moreno also expressed interest to include then incumbent President Rodrigo Duterte in his slate, had he decided to pursue his initial intention to run for senator, despite the two having a fall-out months prior to the filing of candidacy.

== Endorsements ==
Isko Moreno

National-level cabinet and executive officials

- Ronald Adamat, Commission on Higher Education commissioner (2016–present), National Commission on Indigenous Peoples commissioner (2010–2011), and sectoral representative for cultural communities
- Hernani Braganza, Secretary of Agrarian Reform (2001–2003)
- John Castriciones, Secretary of Agrarian Reform (2017–2021)
- Martin Diño, Undersecretary of the Interior and Local Government
- Guiling Mamondiong, Local Water Utilities Administration administrator
- Leonardo Montemayor, Secretary of Agriculture (2001–2002)
- Ernesto Ordoñez, former Undersecretary of Agriculture
- Ruben Torres, Executive Secretary (1995–1998), Secretary of Labor and Employment (1990–1992), and representative from Zambales's 2nd district (2001–2004)

Philippine Congress

- Benny Abante, representative from Manila's 6th district (2004–2010, 2019–present)
- Nanette Castelo-Daza, representative from Quezon City's 4th district (2001–2010)
- Edgar Erice, representative from Caloocan's 2nd district (2013–present)
- Pablo John Garcia, representative from Cebu's 3rd district (2007–2013, 2019–present) and Deputy Speaker of the House of Representatives (2019–present)
- Jaye Lacson–Noel, representative from Malabon's lone district
- Edward Maceda, representative from Manila's 4th district (2016–present)
- ~~Esmael Mangudadatu, representative from Maguindanao's 2nd district (2019–present)~~ (later switched endorsement to Leni Robredo after an amicable agreement with Moreno)
- Zajid "Dong" Mangudadatu, representative from Maguindanao's 2nd district (2013–2019) (affirmed support for Moreno despite after their party formally endorsed Leni Robredo; maintains neutral for Robredo)
- Yul Servo Nieto, representative from Manila's 3rd district (2016–present)
- ~~Serge Osmeña, Senator of the Philippines (1995–2007, 2010–2016) and grandson of President Sergio Osmeña~~ (later switched endorsement to Leni Robredo)
- Ralph Recto, Senator of the Philippines (2001–2007, 2010–present), President pro tempore of the Senate (2013–2016, 2017–present), Senate Minority Leader (2016–2017), National Economic and Development Authority director-general (2008–2009), and representative from Batangas's 4th district (1992–2001)
- Vilma Santos-Recto, representative from Batangas's 6th district (2016–present), Deputy Speaker of the House of Representatives (2019–present), Governor of Batangas (2007–2016), Mayor of Lipa, Batangas (1998–2007), and actress
- ~~Bai Sandra A. Sema, representative from Maguindanao's 1st district (2010–2019) and House Deputy Speaker (2016–2019)~~ (later switched endorsement to Leni Robredo)
- Rolan Valeriano, representative from Manila's 2nd district (2019–present)

Provincial and local officials

- Eric Africa, Mayor of Lipa, Batangas
- Glenn Baricuatro, Mayor of Pinamungahan, Cebu
- Irene Belmonte, Councilor of Quezon City's 4th district
- John Ismael "Jimbo" Borgonia, member of Cebu's 3rd district provincial board
- ~~Rhodora Cadiao, Governor of Antique (2015–present)~~ (later switched endorsement to Bongbong Marcos)
- Lino Cayetano, Mayor of Taguig (2019–present), representative from Taguig–Pateros's 2nd district (2013–2016), Barangay Chairman of Fort Bonifacio, Taguig (2010–2013), and television director
- Richard Canillo, Vice Mayor of Pinamungahan, Cebu
- Cindy Carolino, Mayor of Santa Maria, Laguna
- Tony Carolino, former Mayor of Santa Maria, Laguna and congressional candidate
- ~~Alex Castro, Bulacan Provincial Board member for the 4th district (2016–present), Councilor of Marilao (2007–2013), and actor~~ (later switched endorsement to Leni Robredo)
- Victoria "Tata" Corominas-Torribio, member of Cebu's 3rd district provincial board
- Aljun Diamante, Vice Mayor of Tuburan, Cebu
- Danilo Diamante, Mayor of Tuburan, Cebu
- Ernix Dionisio, Councilor of Manila's 1st district
- Belen Fernandez, former Mayor of Dagupan and mayoralty candidate
- ~~Daniel Fernando, Governor of Bulacan (2019–present), Vice Governor of Bulacan (2010–2019), Bulacan Provincial Board member (1998–2007), and actor~~ (later switched endorsement to Leni Robredo)
- Pablo John D. Garcia IV, Councilor of Barili, Cebu and mayoralty candidate
- Dennis Hernandez, Mayor of Rodriguez, Rizal
- Bryan Kua, Vice Mayor of Dagupan
- Honey Lacuna, Vice Mayor of Manila
- King T. Mangudadatu, member of Maguindanao's 2nd district provincial board
- Cesare Ignatius Moreno, Mayor of Aloguinsan, Cebu
- Raisa Moreno, Vice Mayor of Aloguinsan, Cebu
- Marjorie "Joie" P. Perales, Mayor of Toledo, Cebu
- Ike Ponce, Mayor of Pateros
- Edgar "Egay" San Luis, Mayor of Santa Cruz, Laguna
- Jay Sigue, Vice Mayor of Toledo, Cebu
- Irwin Tieng, Councilor of Manila's 5th district
- Lou Veloso, Councilor of Manila's 6th district

Entertainment personalities

- Jojo Abellana, singer, actor
- Aljur Abrenica, actor, model, singer
- Saicy Aguila, dancer, actress, former Pinoy Big Brother housemate
- Sharifa Akeel-Mangudadatu, Miss Asia Pacific International 2018
- Jericho Arceo, actor, social media personality
- Athena Louis Baetiong, social media personality, model
- This Band, indie pop rock band
- Pio Balbuena, actor, rapper, singer-songwriter, social media personality
- Bassilyo, rapper, actor
- Arianne Bautista, actress, model, host
- Dranreb Belleza, former child actor, visual artist
- Jimmy Bondoc, singer-songwriter, current member of PAGCOR board of directors
- Mark Broze, social media personality
- Kiray Celis, actress
- Kuya Ching, social media personality
- Rez Cortez, actor, former president of the Actors’ Guild of the Philippines, leader of FPJ Volunteers
- Billy Crawford, singer, dancer, host, actor
- Banat By (Byron Cristobal), vlogger, YouTuber, social media personality
- Joaquin Domagoso, actor, model, son of Moreno
- Dumbolicious, social media personality
- Emping, singer, former lead singer of Bisrock band Assembly Language
- Maine Eugenio, gaming and video creator
- Kurt Fick, singer-songwriter
- Charlie Fry, singer-songwriter
- John Gabriel, singer, actor, model, brand ambassador
- Marc Santos Gamboa, social media personality, YouTuber, podcaster, host of Models of Manila
- Jos Garcia, musician and singer of Ikaw Ang Iibigin Ko
- James Reid, actor, model, singer, TV host and former PBB housemate
- King Girado, actor, musician, model and singer of Ba't Di Mo Pagbigyan
- Coleen Garcia, actress, model
- Melissa Gibbs-Pabalan, actress, singer, brand ambassador
- Mocha Girls, all-female singing and dancing group
- Raymond Gorospe, singer, actor, model
- April "Congratulations" Gustilo, dancer, TV personality
- Aneeza Gutierrez, actress, model, brand ambassador
- Hotdog, band, one of the pioneers of the Manila Sound genre
- Patricia Javier, actress, singer, beauty queen, naturopath practitioner
- Young JV, singer, actor, model
- KitKat, actress-comedienne, singer, host
- Yuka Kuroyanagi, social media personality, video gamer
- Aia de Leon, singer, former vocalist of the band Imago
- Keana Louise de Leon, model, social media personality
- McCoy de Leon, actor, dancer, model
- Xian Lim, actor, model
- Jay Manalo, actor, model
- Joaquin and Jovani Manansala, actors
- Marlon Mance, actor, singer
- Tanya Markova, pop/rock band(also performs for rallies of Leni Robredo)
- Ariane Mayola, social media personality
- Luke Mejares, singer
- Glydel Mercado, actress
- Sol Mercado, professional basketball player
- Sofia Miguel, model, vlogger
- Diva Montelaba, actress, model, StarStruck finalist
- KimShy Moves, social media personality
- Jun Nayra, character actor
- SB NewGen, all-female dancing and singing group (also performs for rallies of Bongbong Marcos)
- Nina, singer, nicknamed "The Soul Siren"
- Jaslee Nolasco, social media personality, model
- Tyra Ku Norva, social media personality, model
- Liza Ong, physician and media personality
- Michael Pangilinan, singer (also performs for rallies of Bongbong Marcos)
- Danny Van Passel, music producer, composer of Moreno's signature dance (Dying Inside) To Hold You
- Leah Patricio, singer, contestant of The Voice of the Philippines (season 2)
- Quest, singer, rapper
- Mikee Quintos, actress, singer
- Wendell Ramos, actor, model
- Range999, rapper, hip-hop artist
- Efren Reyes Jr., actor
- Wowie Roxas, also known as Daddie Wowie, talent scout and celebrity manager
- Christine Samson, model, host
- Tricia Santos, volleyball player, TV host, former PBB housemate
- Snooky Serna, actress
- Shamrock, alternative rock band (also performs for rallies of Bongbong Marcos)
- Smugglaz, rapper, actor
- Soapdish, alternative rock band
- Akiko Solon, singer, actress, model, former contestant of Star Power: Sharon Search For the Next Female Superstar
- South Border, RNB band(also performs for rallies of Bongbong Marcos)
- Rommel Tuico, singer, former frontman of Stagecrew
- Mocha Uson, former Overseas Workers Welfare Administration Deputy Administrator, singer, actress, dancer, pro-Duterte blogger and representative candidate for MOCHA Partylist
- Vivian Velez, Director-General of Film Academy of the Philippines, actress
- Boobsie Wonderland, comedienne
- Richard Yap, actor, businessman, recording artist, aspiring politician
- YoungOne, rapper, freestyle rap battle emcee

Political parties

- Aksyon Demokratiko
- Asenso Manileño
- ~~Partido Federal ng Pilipinas (Abubakar Mangelen-led faction)~~ (later switched endorsement to Leni Robredo)
- Partido Federal ng Pilipinas – Panay Chapter (Bongbong Marcos-led faction) (previously endorsed Bongbong Marcos)
- Partido Maharlika (previously endorsed Bongbong Marcos)
- ~~Kilusang Bagong Lipunan – Baguio-Benguet Chapter~~ (previously endorsed Bongbong Marcos; later switched back to Marcos days after)
- Faction of Kilusang Bagong Lipunan (allied with the United Defenders of Democracy and Sovereignty) (previously endorsed Bongbong Marcos)
- Faction of Labor Party Philippines (previously endorsed Bongbong Marcos)
- Ummah Party
- Abono Party-list
- Ang Bumbero ng Pilipinas Party-list
- MOCHA Party-list
- SILBI Party-list
- One Cebu (3rd district officials only)

Organizations

- Faction of Alpha Kappa Rho National Council (a group of officers in Caraga Chapter allegedly switched endorsement from Moreno to Leni Robredo)
- Alliance of Genuine Labor Organizations
- Bus Transport Workers Alliance
- Faction of Mayor Rodrigo Roa Duterte National Executive Coordinating Committee (MRRD-NECC)
- National Confederation of Labor
- One Batangas
- Partido Panaghiusa
- Visayas For Isko-Sara Alliance
- Pilipinas God First Movement, Inc.
- Isko Tayo Kabataan
- Young Organizers for Unity, Truth & Hope
- Isang Bangka, Isang Diwa Movement
- Bagong Pnoy
- Ikaw Muna (IM) Pilipinas (Lead convenor Tim Orbos and former secretary-general Elmer Argaño-led faction, the Visayas, and Zamboanga Chapters later switched endorsement to Leni Robredo)
- President Isko Moreno – Isulong ang Serbisyo sa Katawhan nga Organisado (PRIMO–ISKO)
- Philippine Trade and General Workers Organization
- National Association of Trade Unions
- All Filipino Workers Confederation
- Association of Minimum Wage Earners and Advocates
- 1-Pangarap Pilipinas
- Buhay Kalinga
- Pinoy Ako, Isko Tayo Movement
- Kapampangans for Isko
- Isko Northern Alliance
- Seniors para kay Isko
- Cordillera People’s Liberation Army
- Pilipinas God First United Bangsamoro Isko for President Coalition
- Muntinlupa Isko Supporters
- Truck Drivers of the Philippines Party List
- Federation of Quezon City Tricycle Operators and Drivers Association
- ISAng Pilipinas
- Maritime for Isko
- Letranista Para Kay Isko
- Samahan ng Magsasaka
- Peace Action and Rescue with Dedication to Serve the Society (PARDSS FII)
- Manila’s Finest Force Multiplier’s Alliance
- Diamond Group
- Anti Crime and Community Emergency Response Team (ACCERT)
- JTF Guardians
- Mata ng Maynila
- Batang Maynila Anti-Crime Group
- Made in Manila Movement
- AFCAG-CBP, Inc.
- CIG-Manila
- Isko Na Bai
- Supporters of Isko Moreno Bisaya Ako (SIMBA)
- Inisyatiba Makabayang Pagbabago
- Alagang Isko
- Ordinaryong Lungsoranon
- Task Force Crusaders
- Duterte Riders Team Cebu Inc.
- F4 Cebu Group
- Samar Group for Isko
- Cebu Group of Taxi Operators Incorporated
- Blue Ladies for Isko
- Women for Isko
- Butuan Basurero Association
- Nueva Vizcaya Kalanguya Tribe
- Tayo Si Isko Movement
- Bilis Kilos Youth Movement Supporters
- United Defenders for Democracy and Sovereignty (UDDS)
- Project: The One Philippines (Project TOP)
- FPJ Volunteers for Isko
- Pagadian Subanen Tribe
- ZamBaSulTa Isko Kami headed by Engr. Michael Abubakar
- United Sama Badjau Association Inc. (USBA) chaired by Panglima Adim Atti
- United Imams of the Philippines (ZamBaSulTa Chapter later switched endorsement to Leni Robredo)
- Federation of Muslim Communities in Pampanga, Inc.
- People's Champ United (previously endorsed Manny Pacquiao)
- Philippine Christian Churches Movement (PCCM) (previously endorsed Manny Pacquiao)
- Lawyers for Isko
- Philippine Comprehensive Agrarian Reform Beneficiaries Association, Inc. (PCARBA)
- Marcos Pa Rin (MPR) – Visayas (previously endorsed Bongbong Marcos)
- Philippine Medical Association
- International Academy of Medical Specialists, Inc.
- URBAN4A
- Filipino-United Arab Alliance and United Muslim Umma Bicol
- GID Cnc. Guardians International
- P4MP – Pambansang Manalo, Magsasaka, Magbabaol, Maguuma ng Pilipinas Association
- Mindanao Cocofarmers Association
- IM4BICOL
- Solid Bongbong Marcos for President Worldwide Movement (SBMP) (previously endorsed Bongbong Marcos)
- Indigenous Peoples in Mindanao
- Tawid Biyaya
- One (1) DDS
- Konseho ng mga Datu
- Independent Candidates Alliance Network (ICAN of Mindanao)
- Faction of MNLF
- Faction of MILF
- Basta Tayo Sama-Sama (BTS)
- Alliance BBM Movement (previously endorsed Bongbong Marcos)
- Sandugo Farmers
- Christian Alliance of the Philippines
- IM4P
- YES ISKO
- IMP2020
- Bagong Noypi
- Alliance for Isko Movement (AIM)
- One Team One Goal (OTOG)
- Ama ni ISKO
- ISSA Muslim Community
- Isko Tayo Coalition
- Dyip ni Isko
- ISKOLARS
- NaISKO Paglingkuran ang Bayan Lawyers and Law Students
- YORME ALLIANCE MOVEMENT (formerly ALLIANCE BBM MOVEMENT) (previously endorsed Bongbong Marcos)
- La Liga Pasigueño
- Faction of El Shaddai
- Team Perlas Quezon
- United Pentecostal Church Philippines
- Quezon City Against Corruption
- Faction of Tau Gamma Phi Cebu City Council
Willie Ong

National-level cabinet and executive officials

- Hernani Braganza, Secretary of Agrarian Reform (2001–2003)
- Leonardo Montemayor, Secretary of Agriculture (2001–2002)
- Ernesto Ordoñez, former Undersecretary of Agriculture
- Ruben Torres, Executive Secretary (1995–1998), Secretary of Labor and Employment (1990–1992), and representative from Zambales's 2nd district (2001–2004)

Philippine Congress

- Ralph Recto, Senator of the Philippines (2001–2007, 2010–present), President pro tempore of the Senate (2013–2016, 2017–present), Senate Minority Leader (2016–2017), National Economic and Development Authority director-general (2008–2009), and representative from Batangas's 4th district (1992–2001)
- Vilma Santos-Recto, representative from Batangas's 6th district (2016–present), Deputy Speaker of the House of Representatives (2019–present), Governor of Batangas (2007–2016), Mayor of Lipa, Batangas (1998–2007), and actress
- Edgar Erice, representative from Caloocan's 2nd district (2013–present)

Local officials

- ~~Rhodora Cadiao, Governor of Antique (2015–present)~~ (later switched endorsement to Sara Duterte)
- Lino Cayetano, Mayor of Taguig (2019–present), representative from Taguig–Pateros's 2nd district (2013–2016), Barangay Chairman of Fort Bonifacio, Taguig (2010–2013), and television director
- Ike Ponce, Mayor of Pateros

Entertainment personalities

- Banat By (Byron Cristobal), vlogger, YouTuber, social media personality
- Marc Santos Gamboa, social media personality, YouTuber, podcaster, host of Models of Manila
- Liza Ong, physician and media personality, wife of Ong
- Ronnie Ricketts, actor, martial artist, former Chairman of the Optical Media Board
- Mariz Ricketts, TV host, actress, singer

Organizations

- One Batangas
- United Defenders for Democracy and Sovereignty (UDDS)
- Ikaw Muna (IM) Pilipinas (Lead convenor Tim Orbos and former secretary-general Elmer Argaño-led faction, Visayas, and Zamboanga Chapters later endorsed Kiko Pangilinan)
- Maritime for Isko
- Letranista Para Kay Isko
- Samahan ng Magsasaka
- Isang Bangka, Isang Diwa Movement
- Dyip ni Isko
- Peace Action and Rescue with Dedication to Serve the Society (PARDSS FII)
- Manila’s Finest Force Multiplier’s Alliance
- Diamond Group
- Anti Crime and Community Emergency Response Team (ACCERT)
- JTF Guardians
- Mata ng Maynila
- Batang Maynila Anti-Crime Group
- Made in Manila Movement
- AFCAG-CBP, Inc.
- CIG-Manila
- Bible Baptist Church
- 1-Bangsamoro
- UP Transport Groups

Political parties

- Aksyon Demokratiko
- Asenso Manileño
- BHW Party-list

== Platform ==
10-Point Economic Agenda:

- Housing
- Education
- Labor and employment
- Health
- Tourism and the creative industry
- Infrastructures
- Digital transformation and industry 4.0
- Agriculture
- Good governance
- Smart governance

== Political positions ==
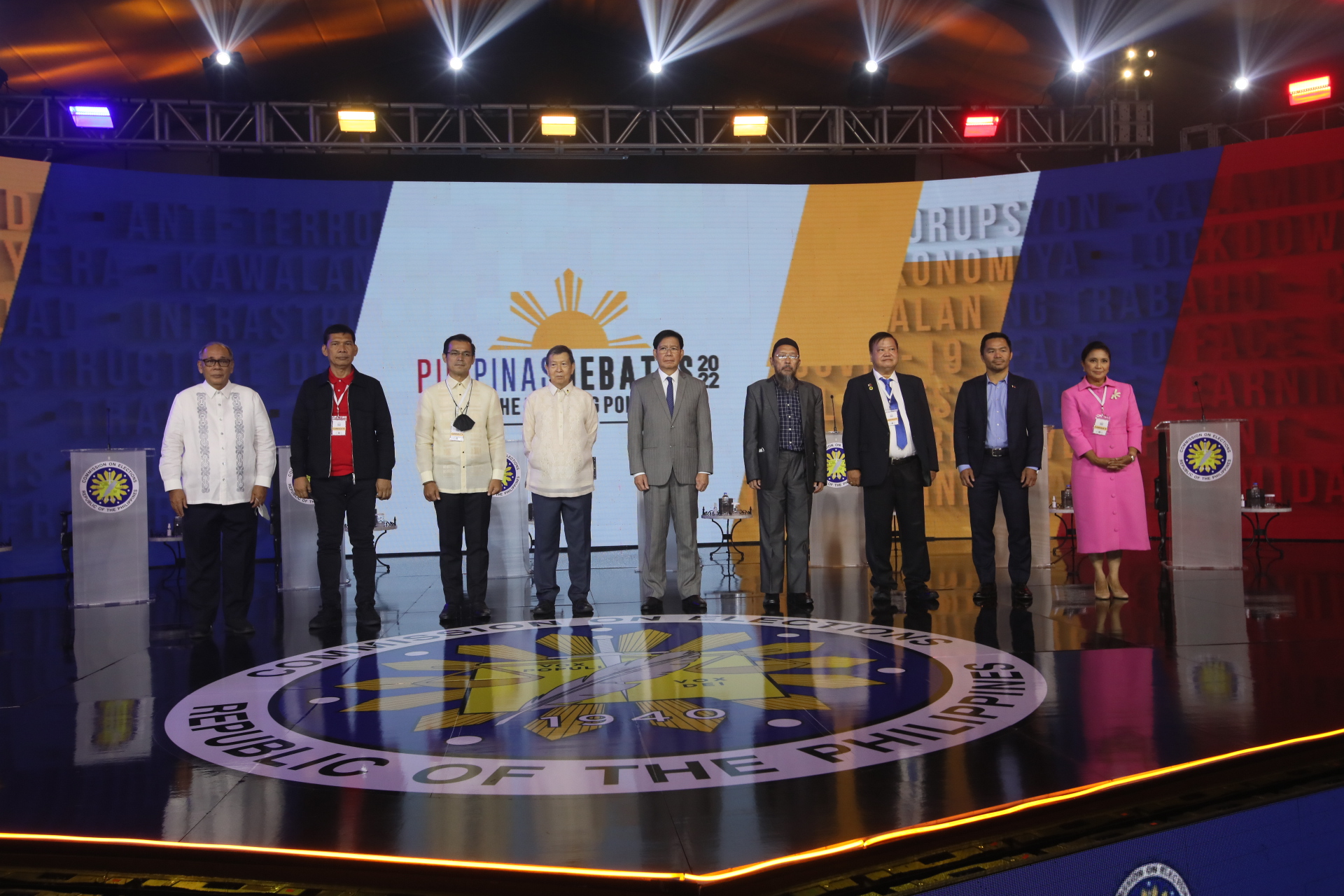
Moreno (third from left) during the Commission on Elections' 1st PiliPinas Debates 2022 on March 19, 2022

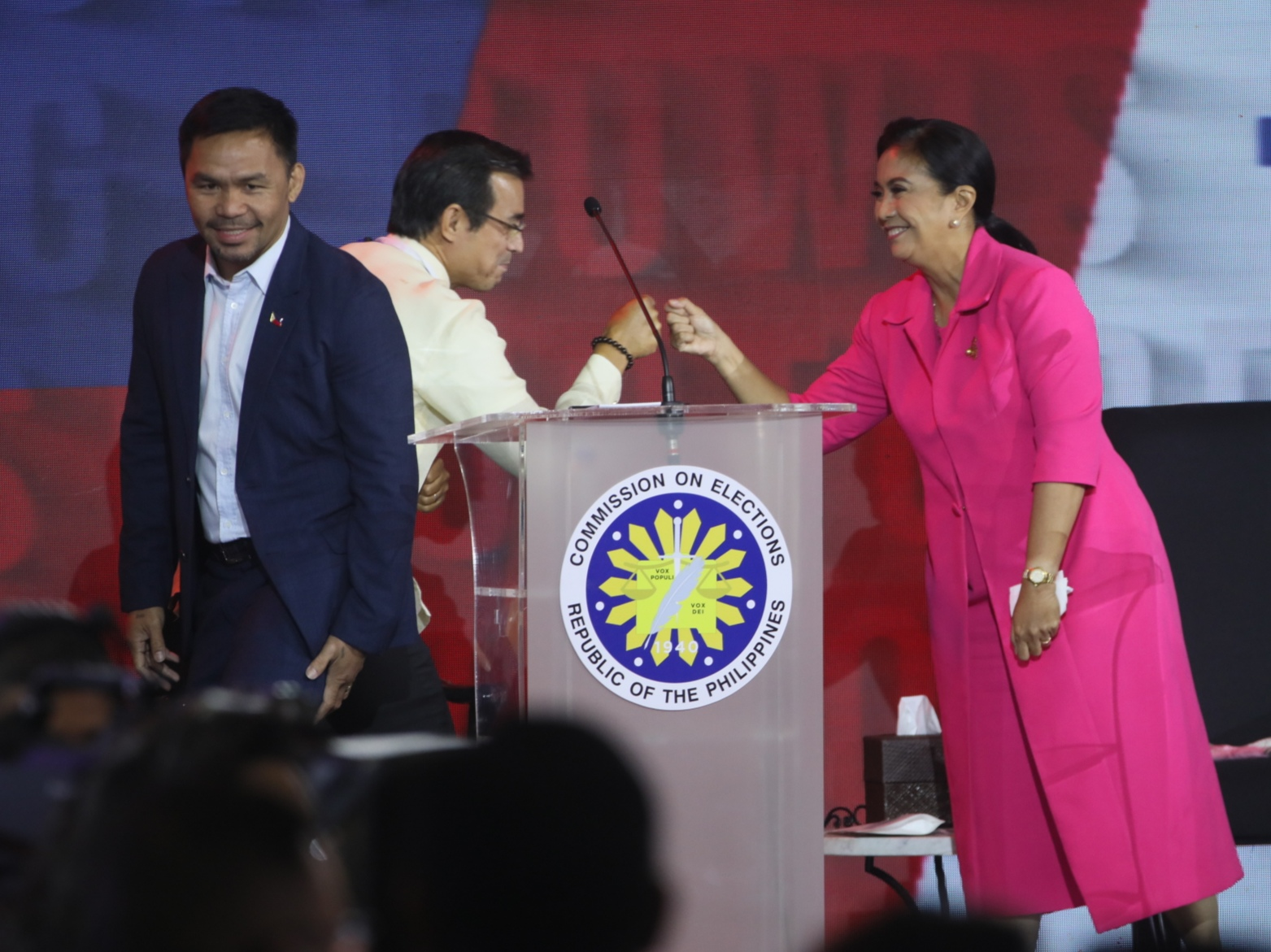
Moreno (center) with fellow presidential aspirants Leni Robredo (right) and Manny Pacquiao (left) during the closing moments of the 2nd PiliPinas Debates 2022 on April 3, 2022

=== Abortion and contraception ===
Moreno is categorically opposed to abortion, reiterating his belief in the "sanctity of life". However, he is open for the government to provide other interventions that would help rape victims "move forward with their lives without harming their child". He is also open to the existing legality of "therapeutic abortion" in the country for medical necessity. Nevertheless, Moreno is in favor for people to freely choose whatever contraception and family planning method they prefer that can be offered by the state.

=== Age of criminal liability ===
Moreno is against the lowering of the age of criminal liability from age 15 to age 9.

=== Capital punishment ===
Moreno is against the reinstatement of the death penalty describing it as "cruel" as it affects wrongly sentenced prisoners.

=== Divorce ===
Moreno said he approves the legalization of divorce in the Philippines.

=== Economy ===
Moreno supports the idea on giving financial assistance to micro, small, and medium enterprises (MSMEs), including 0% interest on loans in financial institutions. Moreno is an advocate of using advanced technology in the agriculture sector. Moreno proposes to create a Department of National Culture and History in the executive branch. He also supports countryside development by constructing a "tourism circuit" and is in favor of digital transformation. Moreno is also in favor of ending contractualization but wants the government to increase employment rate first by generating as many jobs as possible before considering such action.

=== Education ===
Moreno is in favor of amending the educational curriculum in the country by developing tech-voc and agriculture courses in basic education, as well as enhancing the science, technology, engineering, and mathematics curriculum. Moreno is also in favor of enhancing early childhood education and development, as well as improving the accessibility to the internet of students and teachers.

=== Environment ===
Moreno advocates sustainable reforestation in denuded forests by involving indigenous peoples. Moreno is also in favor of responsible mining.

=== Fake news ===
Moreno is in favor of legally penalizing social media sites promoting fake news, disinformation, and misinformation, reiterating his stance as "non-negotiable".

=== Ferdinand Marcos ===
Moreno has said that he admired former President Ferdinand E. Marcos Sr. "at some point", specifically for being a "visionary" and for his infrastructure projects, but condemns his links to corruption and human rights abuses. He also believes that abusers during martial law should be made accountable, and stands firm that martial law must not happen again. Moreno also supports the annual commemoration of the People Power Revolution.

=== Foreign policy ===
Moreno expressed strong opinions on a foreign policy aligned with what he calls a "Filipino-first" policy, envisioning that the Philippines will forge contracts, organizations, and even trade agreements, for that matter, if it is only beneficial to Filipinos.

Moreno agrees that the Philippines is not "militarily prepared" for an encounter with China, and that order must be upheld such as the Law of the Sea. He believes that the country's defense secretary should come from the navy, since the Philippines is an archipelagic country. On the issue of the country's claim to the West Philippine Sea occupied by Chinese forces, he believes that the Philippines' approach should be "fearless" in asserting the claim and should be responsive to the plight of Filipino fishermen, while at the same time should be "fair" and "sensible" in dealing with other countries also occupying the South China Sea, especially in trade. Moreno has criticized the United Nations (UN), questioning what they are doing in light of China's disregard of the Permanent Court of Arbitration (PCA). Moreno asserted that China needs to accept a 2016 arbitration award of the Hague ruling that made clear the Philippines' entitlements, including where it can fish and exploit offshore oil and gas, also citing the Velarde map as reference. However, he also expressed opinion in forming partnerships with other countries as well as to prepare in terms of joint trade with China.

Moreno expressed support of the Philippines returning to the International Criminal Court (ICC) if the move would "give a good impression to the world".

=== Freedom of Information ===
Moreno is in favor that all government officials should be open to disclosing their Statement of Assets, Liabilities, and Net Worth (SALN), including "their properties, belongings and their debts", being a public document. He also believes that the policy on Freedom of Information should be strengthened.

=== Health ===
Moreno expressed the idea to invest in local human resources such as doctors and scientists to make locally made medicines, even a vaccine, in addressing the COVID-19 pandemic in the Philippines. Moreno supports boosting vaccinations and establishing additional specialty hospitals in each of all 17 administrative regions. He also advocates for the establishment of the Cancer Center of the Philippines aiming to provide free medicines and medical procedures to indigents. Moreno is against the legalization of medical marijuana stating that the "government should fix its system first" since it will be subject to abuse, but would reconsider if "further studies from science will prove that marijuana is a more effective treatment than other medicines." Moreno supports the vaping bill and the regulation of electronic cigarettes to provide smokers with alternatives to traditional cigarettes. Moreno is also in favor of promoting and strengthening policies in mental health. Additionally, Moreno believes that PhilHealth will be better managed by financial experts. He also supports increasing wages and benefits of healthcare workers.

=== Infrastructure ===
Moreno has expressed support for the Build! Build! Build! infrastructure program of the Duterte administration. He vows to continue the program and plans to impose a well-planned zoning by making the National Land Use Act a priority legislation. Moreno is in favor of implementing socialized housing programs nationwide.

=== LGBT issues ===
Moreno opposes same-sex marriage but supports same-sex civil unions and LGBT rights.

=== Maritime ===
Moreno spoke strongly on re-evaluating the current setup of the shipbuilding industry in the Philippines, criticizing it by saying that the brand new ships that are built overseas "enjoy tax incentives" but not the ships built by local shipbuilders which generate employment for the country.

=== OFW ===
Moreno is in favor of entering bilateral labor agreement with other countries to ensure the welfare of both documented and undocumented Overseas Filipino Workers (OFW).

=== Party system ===
Moreno pitched the need for the country to shift back to a two-party system for "smooth-sailing governance". Moreno also prefers the election of two senators per region for equal representation and expressed support for the continuation of the party-list representation system but emphasized that there should be safeguards to avoid abuse and manipulation, preferably regionalized to distance away from the idea of Imperial Manila. He also criticized that the party-list system is being used to exploit the poor and extend political dynasties.

=== Political dynasties ===
Moreno bans family members to enter politics or any public office while he remains in a government office. He expressed that he is "not comfortable" with the existence of political dynasties and hoped to implement an anti-political dynasty law if he were to be elected president.

=== Political turncoatism ===
Moreno is not against transferring from one political party to another whenever he sees fit. He has expressed that he does not mind being called a "political butterfly", stating he would rather leave a political party whenever the party loses public trust and if his political principles does not coincide with the party's anymore. He added that "a public servant's loyalty should not lie with a political party, but rather to the people".

=== Pornography ===
Moreno is in favor of legally penalizing social media sites promoting pornography.

=== War on drugs ===
Moreno expressed that he would continue the Duterte administration's flagship war on drugs but without extrajudicial killings linked to it.

=== Women's rights ===
Moreno supports gender equality and women empowerment. He is vocal about providing equal opportunities to women, regardless of social status, sexual preference, religious beliefs or political affiliations. He is also an advocate of meritocracy and favors job promotions based on merits and credentials and not by political affiliations and gender as what he did in the Manila City Hall during his term as mayor. Moreno had also given his vice mayor Honey Lacuna, the first ever elected female vice mayor in the history of Manila, executive functions on a par with his mayoral duties.
