= Herminio Aquino =

Filipino politician (1949–2021)

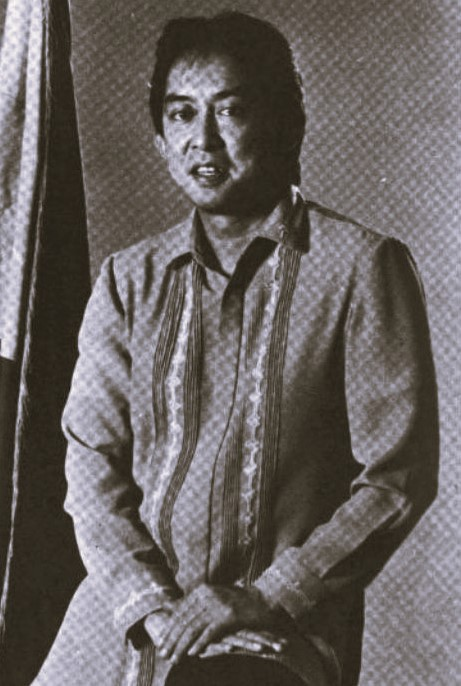
- Aquino official portrait during the 8th Congress.

Vice Governor of Tarlac
- In office June 30, 1998 – June 30, 2001
- Governor: Jose Yap
- Preceded by: Candido Guiam
- Succeeded by: Marcelino Aganon Jr.

Member of the Philippine House of Representatives from Tarlac's 3rd district
- In office June 30, 1987 – June 30, 1998
- Preceded by: District created
- Succeeded by: Jesli Lapus

Chairman of the Aksyon Demokratiko
- In office 2013–2021
- Preceded by: Sonia Roco
- Succeeded by: Ernest Ramel

Secretary General of the Aksyon Demokratiko
- In office 2010–2013
- Preceded by: Lorna Kapunan
- Succeeded by: Ernest Ramel

Personal details
- Born: Herminio Sanchez Aquino; April 25, 1949 Manila, Philippines
- Died: July 31, 2021 (aged 72) Tarlac, Philippines
- Party: Aksyon (1998–2012, 2015–2021)
- Other political affiliations: PDP–Laban (1987–1992); LDP (1992–1998); Liberal (2012–2015)
- Spouse: Ma. Victoria Guanzon
- Children: 4
- Parents: Servillano Aquino (father); Belen Sanchez (mother)
- Relatives: Benigno Aquino Sr. (half-brother)
- Education: Ateneo de Manila University (BA)
- Occupation: Businessman, politician

Herminio Sanchez Aquino (April 25, 1949 – July 31, 2021), also known as Hermie Aquino, was a Filipino businessman, politician, and a vice presidential candidate who ran as the running mate of Raul Roco in 2004.

== Early life and education ==
Aquino was born in 1949 in Manila, Philippines to Gen. Servillano "Mianong" Aquino and Belen Sanchez. He was the half-uncle of Benigno Aquino Jr. (Ninoy) and half-grand uncle of former President Benigno Aquino III.

He graduated with honors with a degree of Bachelor of Arts in Economics at the Ateneo de Manila University in 1969.

== Business career ==
As a businessman, he held various top-management positions that included vice president of G.A. Machineries Inc. from 1974 to 1981, senior consultant of Management and Investment Development Associates Inc. from 1972 to 1985, and vice president of Circa Nila Development Corp. from 1981 to 1985.

== Political career ==
After the People Power Revolution in 1986, he was invited by his relative by marriage, President Corazon Aquino to join the government. He served as deputy executive secretary and minister of the Ministry of Human Settlements from 1986 to 1987.

Aquino ran for congressman and won as the representative from the 3rd district of Tarlac from 1987 to 1998. Since Philippine laws limit a congressman to serve only for three consecutive terms, he ran as Tarlac provincial vice governor under Margarita "Ting-Ting" Cojuangco, sister-in-law of Corazon Aquino. He won the election and served from 1998 to 2001. He ran again for his second term in 2001 but together with Mrs. Cojuangco, lost to Lakas-NUCD-UMDP candidates.

== Post-political life ==
Aquino returned to private life as a businessman. He became chairman and president of Buenavista Management Corporation which serves as management consultants, financial advisors, and project packagers. He was concurrently the chairman Trackworks Inc., an advertising and retail company for Metro Rail Transit.

He was the campaign manager and fund raiser for the Aksyon Demokratiko Party. He was invited by Raul Roco to be his running mate for the 2004 elections. He accepted the offer to run for the position of Vice President of the Philippines. However, he gathered less than a million votes and lost to Noli de Castro.

He returned again to private life and his previous position in business.

In 2013 elections, he ran for congressman in 3rd district of Tarlac under the Liberal Party. However, he placed third and lost to Concepcion Mayor Noel Villanueva.

He served as the national chairman of Aksyon Demokratiko.

== Personal life and death ==
Hermie, as many call him, was married to Ma. Victoria Guanzon. Their four children are Servillano III, Paolo Antonio, Ma. Theresa Belinda, and Ma. Camille Corazon.

Aquino died due to complications from cancer on July 31, 2021, at the age of 72, more than a month after his half-grandnephew Benigno III died.
