= Kaye Ann Legaspi =

Filipino politician (born 1995)

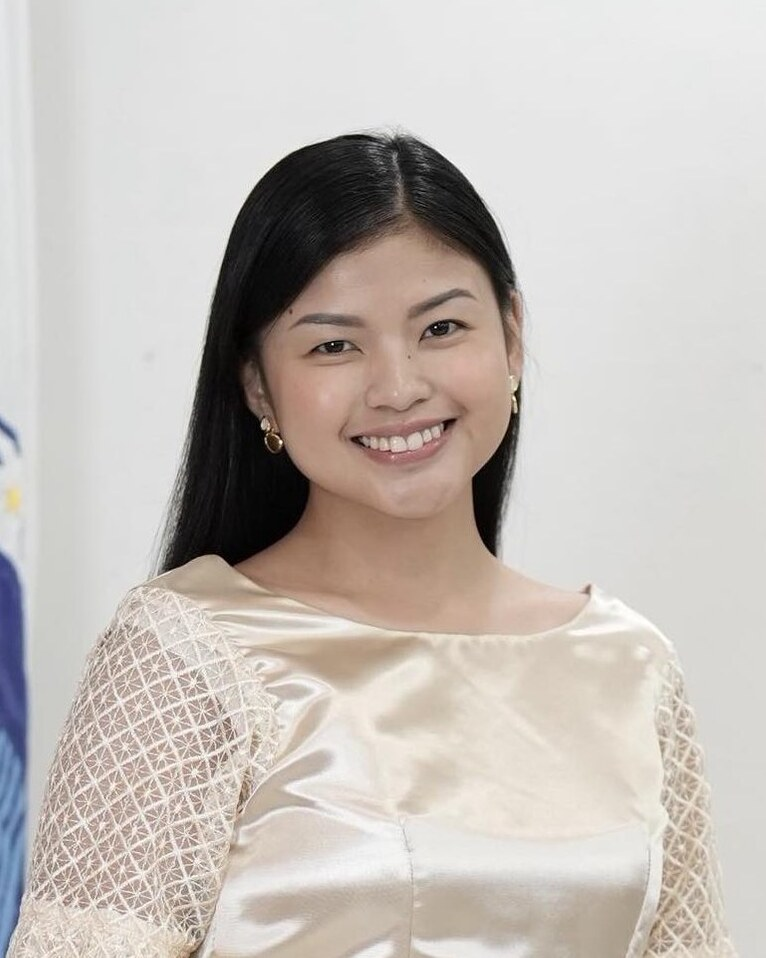
- Official portrait, 2026

Vice Mayor of Olongapo
- Incumbent
- Assumed office June 30, 2025
- Mayor: Rolen Paulino Jr.
- Preceded by: Aquilino "Jong" Cortez Jr.

Member of the Olongapo City Council
- In office June 30, 2019 – June 30, 2025

Personal details
- Born: Kaye Ann Sioson Legaspi; January 16, 1995 (age 31)
- Party: Aksyon Demokratiko (2018–2022; 2024–present)
- Other political affiliations: Independent (2015–2018; 2022–2024)
- Education: University of Asia and the Pacific (BA)
- Profession: Politician

Kaye Ann Sioson Legaspi (born 16 January 1995) is a Filipino politician. She is currently serving as vice mayor of Olongapo since 2025. She served as city councilor of Olongapo from 2019 to 2025. She is noted in Philippine politics for her leadership position in Aksyon Demokratiko, a major political party in the Philippines, of which she became Vice President for Youth in 2021. Legaspi took on national issues in the Philippines even before her entry into politics, and was one of the intervenors who filed a petition to reverse the voiding of the appointment of Chief Justice Maria Lourdes Sereno.

== Early life and education ==
Legaspi was born into a family of Chess players. She is the youngest daughter of lawyer and chess enthusiast Edmundo Legaspi, who also acts as her trainer. Her father is also a high-ranking officer of the National Chess Federation of the Philippines (NCFP).

At an early age, Legaspi has been competing in numerous chess tournaments, both local and international. At 7 years old, she was the chess champion of OCPRISAA, a city-level tournament in Olongapo, and also garnered bronze medals at the Age Group Championships and the 5th Asian Schools Chess Championship. On 2006, she represented the Philippines at the Asian Schools Chess Festival held in Singapore. She competed in the girls under-11 category against the representatives of Malaysia, Singapore, India, Sri Lanka, South Korea, and Indonesia.

Legaspi graduated from the University of Asia and the Pacific (UA&P). After graduating at the UA&P, she enrolled at the Arellano University School of Law.

== Early career and advocacies ==
In April 2018, Legaspi one of the intervenors who filed a petition to reverse the voiding of the appointment of Chief Justice Maria Lourdes Sereno. Hers was one of eleven petitions on the matter, with other petitioners including Former Senator Rene Saguisag and Catholic Bishop Broderick Pabillo.

In August 2018, Legaspi, as executive director of Trust and Believe In Me Foundation (TBIMF), launched the Iskool on Wheels program. The volunteers of the TBIMF spent several hours tutoring homeless kids at a day care center in Olongapo.

Before filing her candidacy for city councilor, she was the National Interim President of Aksyon Kabataan, the youth arm of Aksyon Demokratiko, a major political party in the Philippines.

== Political career ==
=== First Sangguniang Panlungsod term (2019–2022) ===
Legaspi filed her candidacy for the 2019 Philippine general election to become a member of the Sangguniang Panlungsod of Olongapo City under Aksyon. She won the elections and took her oath as city councilor. In August 2019, the Sangguniang Panlungsod members of Olongapo City convened to conduct their general assembly and the election of Philippine Councilors' League (PCL) Olongapo City Chapter Officers. Legaspi was elected as the Treasurer of the chapter.

In June 2020, the Kabataan Kontra Droga at Terorismo (KKDAT) held its virtual summit. The KKDAT is an advocacy program of the Philippine National Police (PNP) to organize, train, and mobilize the youth and student sectors to become proactive partners of the Philippine government against illegal drugs and terrorism. Legaspi, as the Region 3 President of KKDAT, along with other KKDAT and PNP officials joined the virtual summit.

In November 2020, Legaspi took oath as one of the newest member of the PRO-Central Luzon Regional Advisory Council. Following the eruption of Taal Volcano in 2020, Legaspi, along with other public officials, extended help to Batangas policemen who have been displaced by the eruption of the volcano. They distributed relief goods to 1,000 policemen of Batangas PPO in Region IV- A, Camp Malvar, Batangas City. In July 2021, Legaspi joins the PNP in the celebration of the 26th Police Community Relations Month. The celebration was held at the PRO3 Parade Ground, Camp Olivas, San Fernando City.

In August 2021, Legaspi was declared by Aksyon Demokratiko, as a national officer of the party, the Vice President for Youth.

=== 2022 Philippine general election campaign ===
During the 2022 Philippine general election, Legaspi once again ran under Aksyon Demokratiko. During the course of the campaign, however, she refused to support the party's standard bearer, Manila mayor Isko Moreno, continuing to openly support the presidential candidacy of Vice President Leni Robredo, as she had done as early as 2021. Legaspi also endorsed the vice presidential candidacy of Davao City mayor Sara Duterte, also not from Aksyon Demokratiko.

On April 19, 2022, Legaspi, along with other officers, former officers, youth organizers, members, and volunteers of Aksyon Demokratiko released an official statement condemning Moreno's calls for Robredo to withdraw its candidacy in a press conference.

In a press release statement of Aksyon Demokratiko chairman Ernesto Ramel Jr. also on April 19, he said that Legaspi resigned in early March 2022 as announced on Facebook, and not because of the press conference. In a televised interview on April 21, however, Legaspi asserted that she had not officially resigned from Aksyon Demokratiko. The party still dismissed her claim.

=== Second Sangguniang Panlungsod term (2022–2025) ===
Legaspi won a second term on the Sangguniang Panlungsod of Olongapo City in the 2022 Philippine general election, garnering 48,431 votes.

=== Vice Mayor of Olongapo (2025-Present) ===
During the 2025 Philippine general election, Legaspi ran for the post of Vice Mayor of Olongapo City, doing so as a member once again of Aksyon Demokratiko. She won the post with 39,304 votes (31.98%).

== Chess advocacy ==
Aside from being a public servant, Legaspi organizes chess tournaments with the help of other city officials and chess groups. She also serves as an adviser of the g4 Chess Club, an affiliated chess club of the NCFP based in Olongapo City.
