= Aksyon Demokratiko =

Centrist political party in the Philippines

- President: Isko Moreno
- Chairman: Ernest Ramel Jr.
- Secretary General: Leon Flores III
- Founder: Raul Roco
- Founded: 1997
- Split from: LDP
- Headquarters: Ground floor San Andres Sports Complex, San Andres St., Barangay 704 Malate, Manila, 1004 Metro Manila
- Newspaper: Aksyon
- Youth wing: Aksyon Kabataan
- Sectoral organization: Aksyon Dapat
- Ideology: Progressivism; Liberal democracy; Populism
- Political position: Centre to centre-left
- National affiliation: PPC (2001); Alyansa ng Pag-asa (2004); Genuine Opposition (2007); PGP (2016); Otso Diretso (2019); Team Bilis Kilos (2022)
- Colors: Blue; White; Yellow; Tropical Indigo (customary)
- Senate: 0 / 24
- House of Representatives: 0 / 318
- Provincial Governors: 1 / 82
- Provincial Vice Governors: 1 / 82
- Provincial Board Members: 10 / 840

Aksyon Demokratiko ([ʔɐkˌʃon dɛ.moˌkɾaː.tɪˈxo], lit. 'Democratic Action'), or simply Aksyon, is a political party in the Philippines founded by Raul Roco. It was recognized as a national political party in 1998 by the Commission on Elections (COMELEC) and is considered to be one of the major parties in the Philippines. Manila Mayor Isko Moreno currently acts as president of the party.

== History ==
=== 1998 elections: Foundation of Aksyon ===
Senator Raul Roco resigned from LDP to form Aksyon Demokratiko for his plans for running in the 1998 presidential elections. He chose peace negotiator Irene Santiago as his vice-presidential candidate. However, both lost to then Vice President Joseph Estrada and then-Senator Gloria Macapagal Arroyo.

=== 2001 elections ===
Aksyon joined the People Power Coalition, with economist and former NEDA Director General Winnie Monsod as one of its senatorial candidates from Aksyon in 2001 senatorial elections. Monsod campaigned for IT-ready teachers, and solving Mindanao issues, but she lost the election.

=== 2004 elections: Alyansa ng Pag-asa ===
In 2004, Roco sought the presidency for a second time with former Tarlac Congressman Hermie Aquino as his running-mate. They forged an alliance with Rene de Villa's Partido Reporma, and Lito Osmeña's PROMDI (both of them are Roco's opponent in 1998) to form their Alyansa ng Pag-asa slate (originally called as Alyansa ng Bayan).

During their December 1 convention, Aksyon nominated 19 personalities for their senatorial ticket: Rene de Villa, de Villa's former running mate Oscar Orbos, Senator Rodolfo Biazon, former Transportation and Communications secretaries Josie Lichauco, former Pasay Congresswoman Lorna Verano-Yap, former agriculture secretary Leonardo Montemayor, Police Chief Superintendent Romeo Maganto, former assemblyman Emil Ong, former solicitor general Frank Chavez, bowling champion Bong Coo, retired Gen. Rodolfo Gutang, Lanao del Sur Congressman Dimaporo Ramos, Sulu Congressman Arden Anni, Misamis Oriental Congressman Oscar Moreno, economist and their 2001 senatorial candidate Monsod, broadcasters Pia Cayetano, TV personality Jay Sonza and Melanio "Batas" Mauricio, and Christy Ramos, daughter of former President Fidel Ramos.

But their final senate slate was reduced to only seven candidates with Coo, Nicanor Gatmaytan Jr., Nueva Ecija politician Eduardo Nonato Joson, Mauricio, Sonza, and former bureaucrat Perfecto Yasay selected in the slate, with the inclusion of Chavez from Reporma. Former DOH official Dr. Jaime Galvez-Tan served as campaign manager.

Ano ang inilalaban natin? Karangalan para sa Pilipino.

[What are we fighting for? Honor for the Filipino people.]

— Raul Roco

Roco performed second to third in pre-election surveys but he had needed to leave for the United States for prostate cancer treatment. Despite a decrease in support because of his recurring illness, Roco insisted that he will not resign from candidacy. Also, the party feared vote buying initiated by President Arroyo's Lakas–CMD.

Roco and the whole Alyansa lost the election, but he later called out Arroyo about her controversial election victory. In August 2005, Roco died at the age of 63.

=== 2007 elections: Joining GO ===
Aksyon aligned with the Genuine Opposition (GO), the opposition against President Arroyo, Roco's former opponent in 2004 elections. Sonia Roco, Raul Roco's widow, ran for Senate in 2007 but lost.

=== 2009: "Coalition for the Deserving" ===
In 2009, Aksyon joined a coalition formation with Reporma, and Kilusang Bagong Lipunan and called it "Coalition for the Deserving" in preparation for 2010 elections led by Efraim Genuino, member of Bigkis Pinoy Movement and PAGCOR chairman. But after the launch, then-Aksyon's Secretary General Jay Sonza and Reporma disowned the coalition, saying that party leaders were not consulted, as Bigkis Pinoy is raiding other political parties for still unknown reasons without their consultation.

Old Aksyon logo 1997-2009

=== 2010 elections: Liberal Party's campaign ===
In 2010, the party signed a coalition agreement with the Liberal Party in order to jointly field then Senator Benigno Aquino III for president. Now-party Chairwoman Sonia Roco was added in the senatorial slate of Senator Aquino's campaign.

=== 2016: Partido Galing at Puso ===
For the 2016 Philippine general election, the party fielded national and local candidates throughout the Philippines including lawyer Lorna Kapunan and TIEZA COO Mark Lapid. It was aligned with the candidacy of Grace Poe, with Kapunan tapped into Poe's Partido Galing at Puso. Aksyon also supported Poe' candicacy for president.

=== 2019: Rise of Vico Sotto and Otso Diretso ===
The party's standard bearer for the 2019 senatorial elections was former Solicitor General Florin Hilbay, who joined Otso Diretso. Prominent local government candidates of the party during the 2019 elections included Vico Sotto and Roman Romulo, who ran as mayor and representative of Pasig respectively, and Marielle del Rosario as representative of Navotas.

=== 2022 elections and Isko Moreno's presidential run ===
==== Possible coalition with NPC ====
After the declaration of Ping Lacson and Tito Sotto for declaring their campaign to run for president and vice president respectively, they discussed with Aksyon's top officials and Vico Sotto for possible coalition.

==== Bilis Kilos: Isko Moreno's presidential run ====
In 2021, Aksyon named then-Manila Mayor Isko Moreno Domagoso, who just joined the party from the National Unity Party, as its new party president ahead of the 2022 Philippine presidential election. New notable party members that would follow included 2019 senatorial candidates Willie Ong, Samira Gutoc, Caloocan 2nd district representative Edgar Erice and former Vice President Noli de Castro. Ong was selected by Moreno as his running mate, with Gutoc, educator Carl Balita, and former Ipaglaban Mo! host Jopet Sison as its senatorial slate members. The nomination was skipped by Vico Sotto due to his commitments at city of Pasig. Moreno also launched his campaign tagline "Bilis Kilos" (Fast Action).

A number of party members expressed disappointment with Aksyon's choices during the 2022 election campaign. In October 2021, former Aksyon Demokratiko senatorial candidate Florin Hilbay resigned from Aksyon Demokratiko "out of ethical considerations," because he chose to support the candidacy of Vice President Leni Robredo instead of that of Domagoso, adding that "We can't afford another narcissistic, gas lighting troll for a president" but without specifically mentioning Domagoso by name. On April 2, 2022, former Aksyon executive director Erdie de los Santos also resigned to support Robredo rather than Domagoso. Olongapo City Councilor Kaye Ann Legaspi, Aksyon's former vice president for youth affairs, led a faction of about a hundred party members expressing disappointment over Domagoso's tactics and saying that he was "damaging" the values that the party's founder Raul Roco had represented.

Aksyon, led by its chairman Ernest Ramel, criticized the reports of media against Moreno, stating that its just a sinister attack and fabricating news about defection of supporters to Leni Robredo's camp. He also criticized Legaspi for releasing a letter about their defection with attacks on Moreno.

Despite criticisms Moreno faced from some former Aksyon members including resigned ones, Roco's family, including the party's chairwoman emerita Sonia Roco, and Bobbit Roco, her son and former party president stuck with Moreno's campaign.

Moreno, Ong, and some Aksyon members who ran in the senate all lost, but some in the grassroots level candidates like Ike Ponce (who won Mayorship of Pateros). In a thanksgiving party, Moreno stated that even they lost, he manifested that Aksyon can be felt "by the people for the next three years in their lives".

==== Vico Sotto's resignation ====
In June 2022, immediately after the 2022 elections, Executive Vice-president Vico Sotto resigned from the party, saying he believed "recent events have made it apparent that the party is now headed towards a different direction." However, Sotto did not announce the fact of his resignation until five months later, in November 2022.

=== 2025 elections ===
==== Local elections ====
Aksyon Demokratiko logo used until September 3, 2024

In July 2024, Duterte critic and former senator Sonny Trillanes joined the party to run for 2025 mayoral election in Caloocan, with the support from KiBam and Senator Risa Hontiveros. Also, party president Moreno was also fielded to return to his former position, the mayorship of Manila, against the incumbent Honey Lacuna, who left the party for Lakas. More new members were sworn into the party ahead of the 2025 elections, including Moreno's son Joaquin Domagoso, Mocha Uson (a key Duterte ally), former basketball player Paul Alvarez—who are running for councilor of Manila—as well as former Manila representatives Carlo Lopez and Amado Bagatsing. Moreno cited that the membership of Trillanes and Uson, as those politicians who did not want any fighting or feud like them are joining Aksyon.

Also, additional new party members include former congressman Paolo Javier who will run for governor of Antique, Barangay Baclaran chairman Jun Zaide who will seek the post of mayor of Paranaque, and former Batanes Governor Telesforo Castillejos who will run for his former post. The other new members hailed from Malabon City, Pasay City and the provinces of Isabela, Cagayan, Kalinga, Camarines Norte, Sorsogon, Romblon, Antique, Maguindanao del Sur, Rizal, Misamis Oriental, Zambales, Occidental Mindoro, La Union, Bohol, Tarlac, Laguna, Bulacan, and Basilan.

Aksyon won in Manila, as Moreno and Atienza, with the support from Vice President Sara Duterte, snapped victory, with 23 city councilors, and Joey Uy, who defeated the incumbent Benny Abante for 6th congressman district seat. Party chairman Ramel stated that these victories were a sign that the party will be more stronger to 2028 elections.

Also, in Antique, former Congressman Paolo Javier won as party's gubernatorial bet, Eufemia A. Dacayo snapped victory as Vice Governor of Nueva Vizcaya, and with the congressional victories of Tim Cayton from Nueva Vizcaya, and Dibu Tuan from South Cotabato. But later, Uy disqualified while Dibu Tuan joined Lakas.

==== Senate elections ====
AGRI Partylist congressman Wilbert Lee joined Aksyon to run for senate elections in 2025 with the party's last election's vice presidential nominee Willie Ong, who is still undergoing treatment in Singapore. Ong was represented by his wife Dra. Liza Ong who also sworn in as member of Aksyon.

But on the start of the campaign season in February both Lee (February 10) and Ong (February 13) withdrawn their candidacy. Lee stated that he will not continue to campaign after meeting co-members at AGRI, and the lack of machinery, while Ong will focus on health recovery.

== Ideology ==
Magbago! (Change!) Makialam! (Participate!) Sulong sa Bagong Pilipinas! (Forward to a New Philippines!) are the party's slogans. Aksyon is rooted in Raul Roco's The Agenda of Hope: honest government; opportunity for all, special privileges for none; peace, productivity and prosperity; education and environment for sustainable development.

Aksyon believes that there should be regional solutions to regional problems. Aksyon organises itself based on the principles of local autonomy. It believes and pushes for the empowerment of the Filipino masses. The party advocates a 'bottom-up' approach in tackling the issues of the country. Aksyon recognizes the importance of the participation of youth in government and therefore actively pushes for the empowerment of the youth.

== Election results ==
=== Presidential and vice presidential elections ===
Year	Presidential election			Vice presidential election		
Year	Candidate	Vote share	Result	Candidate	Vote share	Result
1998	Raul Roco	13.38%	Joseph Estrada (LAMMP/PMP)	Irene Santiago	0.94%	Gloria Macapagal Arroyo (Lakas)
2004	Raul Roco	6.45%	Gloria Macapagal Arroyo (Lakas)	Herminio Aquino	3.24%	Noli de Castro (Independent)
2010	None (Note: Aksyon endorsed Benigno "Noynoy" Aquino III of the Liberal)		Benigno Aquino III (Liberal)	None		Jejomar Binay (PDP–Laban)
2016	None (Note: Aksyon endorsed Grace Poe of the PGP)		Rodrigo Duterte (PDP–Laban)	None		Leni Robredo (Liberal)
2022	Isko Moreno	3.57%	Bongbong Marcos (Partido Federal)	Willie Ong	3.57%	Sara Z. Duterte (Lakas)

=== Legislative elections ===
Year	House Seats won	Result	Year	Senate Seats won	Ticket	Result
1998	1 / 258	Lakas plurality	1998	Not participating		LAMMP win 7/12 seats
2001	2 / 256	Lakas plurality	2001	1 / 13	People Power	People Power win 8/13 seats
2004	2 / 261	Lakas plurality	2004	0 / 12	Alyansa ng Pag-asa	K4 win 7/12 seats
2007	Not participating	Lakas plurality	2007	0 / 12	Genuine Opposition	Genuine Opposition win 8/12 seats
2010	0 / 286	Lakas plurality	2010	Not participating		Liberal win 4/12 seats
2013	0 / 292	Liberal plurality	2013	Not participating		Team PNoy win 9/12 seats
2016	1 / 297	Liberal plurality	2016	0 / 12	Split ticket	Daang Matuwid win 7/12 seats
2019	1 / 304	PDP–Laban plurality	2019	0 / 12	Otso Diretso	Hugpong win 9/12 seats
2022	3 / 304	PDP–Laban plurality	2022	0 / 12	Team Bilis Kilos	UniTeam win 6/12 seats
2025	3 / 317	Lakas plurality	2025	Not participating (Note: Wilbert Lee and Willie Ong withdrawn their candidacy in February 2025. The Isko Moreno/Manila faction supports some DuterTen candidates like Bong Go, Rodante Marcoleta, and Jimmy Bondoc, as well as Alyansa members Manny Pacquiao and Francis Tolentino. The Trillanes/Caloocan faction supports Bam Aquino and Francis Pangilinan.)		Alyansa win 6/12 seats

=== Local (Provincial, HUCs, and ICCs) ===
Election	Provincial Governor	Provincial Vice Governor	Provincial Legislature	HUCs / ICCs Mayor	HUCs / ICCs Vice Mayor	HUCs / ICCs legislature
2022	1 / 81	3 / 81	17 / 782	3 / 38	5 / 38	16 / 530
2025	1 / 82	1 / 82	7 / 840	1 / 40	1 / 40	27 / 540

== Current party officials ==
- Sonia Roco, Party co-founder, Chair Emeritus
- Ernest Ramel (former Aksyon Demokratiko's Secretary General), Party Chairman and National Executive Board Member
- Francisco Moreno Domagoso (Mayor of Manila), Party President and National Executive Board Member
- vacant, Vice Chairperson and National Executive Board Member
- Leon Flores III (former National Youth Commission Chairperson), Secretary-General and National Executive Board Member
- vacant, vice-president for Internal Affairs and National Executive Board Member
- Atty. Bobbit Roco, vice-president for External Affairs and National Executive Board Member
- May Lim, vice-president for Women Affairs
- Jayson San Juan, Deputy Secretary-General
- Michael Roy Cuerpo, Treasurer and National Executive Board Member
- Atty. Normandy Baldovino Jr, General Counsel and National Executive Board Member
- Samira Gutoc, National Executive Board Member
- Antonio Aquino, National Executive Board Member
- Frein Jarane P. Castañeda (former Mariveles, Bataan Councilor), National Executive Board Member
- Danilo De Guzman (current Mandaluyong City Councilor), National Executive Board Member
- Atty. Ernesto C. Isip Jr. (current Manila City Councilor), National Executive Board Member
- Richard C. Ibay (former Manila City Councilor), National Executive Board Member
- Anthony P. Sanchez, National Executive Board Member
- Jose Cabochan, National Executive Board Member
- Sainthia Joy A. Sorilla (current New Lucena, Iloilo Councilor), National Executive Board Member
- Manuel M. Zarcal (former Manila City Councilor), National Executive Board Member

== Membership ==
The following are the oath taken by new members:

Ako si (pangalan), mula sa (distrito / municipalidad / lungsod / probinsya), ay taimtim na nanunumpa bilang kasapi ng Aksyon Demokratiko. Buong loob kong isusulong ang mga prinsipyo ng Aksyon upang makamit ang isang progresibo, inklusibo, at masaganang bayan na may malinis at epektibong pamahalaan, nagmamalasakit sa bawat Pilipino. Patuloy akong maniniwala sa likas na galing, lakas, at pagkamalikhain ng Pilipino. Ako'y magiging lider na nagsusulong ng mga pagbabago, nagpapaginhawa sa aking kapwa, at makapagbigay-boses, at kaunlaran sa mga nangangailangan. Handa akong magmulat, mas handa akong umaksyon para sa demokrasya, para sa bayan. [Kasihan nawa ako ng Diyos.]

== Party leadership history ==
=== Party chairperson (chairman/chairwoman) ===
Chairperson	Term start	Term end
Jaime Galvez–Tan	1997	2005
Cho Roco	2005	2006
Sonia Roco	2006	2013
Herminio Aquino	2013	July 31, 2021
Ernest Ramel	August 12, 2021	present

=== Party president ===
President	Term start	Term end
Raul Roco	1997	August 5, 2005
Herminio Aquino	2005	2009
Jaime Galvez-Tan	2009	2013
Robbie Pierre "Bobbit" Roco	2013	August 12, 2021
Isko Moreno Domagoso	August 12, 2021	present
