= 2025 Pateros local elections =

43rd mayoral election in Pateros

2025 Pateros mayoral election
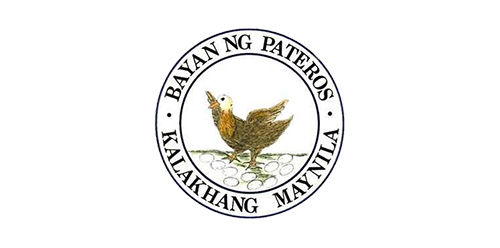
- May 12, 2025
- Turnout: 80.78% ▼3.88 pp
Nominee	Gerald German	Ronnie S. Miranda
Party	PFP	NUP
Running mate	John Mendiola Cerafica	John Peter Marzan
Popular vote	16,459	13,001
Percentage	55.87%	44.13%
Mayor before election
Miguel "Ike" Ponce III
Aksyon
Elected mayor
Gerald German
PFP
- Vice mayoral election
Candidate	Carlo Santos	John Peter Marzan	John Mendiola Cerafica
Party	Nacionalista	NUP	PFP
Popular vote	15,678	9,393	3,992
Percentage	53.94%	32.32%	13.74%
Vice Mayor before election
Carlo Santos
Nacionalista
Elected Vice Mayor
Carlo Santos
Nacionalista

Local elections were held in Pateros on May 12, 2025, as part of the 2025 Philippine general election. The electorate will elect local elective posts in the municipality: the mayor, vice mayor, the district representative of Taguig-Pateros, and six councilors in each of the municipality's two districts.

== Tickets ==
Candidates in italics indicate incumbents seeking reelection.

Note: Paul Argie Cruz is a guest candidate of Team Good Governance Pateros.

=== Administration coalition ===
Team Good Governance Pateros
Position	#	Name	Party
Mayor	1.	Gerald German	PFP
Vice mayor	1.	John Mendiola Cerafica	PFP
For House of Representatives (1st District/Taguig-Pateros)	2.	Allan Cerafica	PFP
Councilor (1st district)	4.	Leonila "Nene" Bermejo	PFP
Councilor (1st district)	8.	Allan Dela Cruz	PFP
Councilor (1st district)	10.	Ruel Gatpayat	PFP
Councilor (1st district)	17.	Luis Augusto "Luigi" Marcelo	PFP
Councilor (1st district)	19.	Oscar "Jon-Jon" Ongmanchi Jr.	PFP
Councilor (1st district)	21.	Nestito "Don" Ponce Jr.	PFP
Councilor (2nd district)	2.	Maria Kathleen "Ayie" Ampe	PFP
Councilor (2nd district)	4.	Paul Argie Cruz	KANP
Councilor (2nd district)	6.	John Lester "Teng" Joson	PFP
Councilor (2nd district)	11.	Ryan-Thed Millares	PFP
Councilor (2nd district)	13.	Ian Ponce	PFP
Councilor (2nd district)	15.	Jonell Raymundo	PFP

=== Opposition coalitions ===
Matatag na Pateros
Position	#	Name	Party
Mayor	2.	Ronnie S. Miranda	NUP
Vice mayor	2.	John Peter Marzan	NUP
Councilor (1st district)	1.	Johns "Hapon" Abino	NUP
Councilor (1st district)	7.	Fernando "Ding" Datu	NUP
Councilor (1st district)	13.	Moner Luna	NUP
Councilor (1st district)	14.	Jay Mabanglo	NUP
Councilor (1st district)	16.	Joseph "Monay" Manzon	NUP
Councilor (1st district)	23.	Ramir Ramirez	NUP
Councilor (2nd district)	5.	Arcangel "Joey" De Lara Jr.	NUP
Councilor (2nd district)	7.	Rommel Lambino	NUP
Councilor (2nd district)	8.	Jun Ling	NUP
Councilor (2nd district)	9.	Ejercito "Chito" Lorenzo	NUP
Councilor (2nd district)	12.	Richard Palican	NUP
Councilor (2nd district)	16.	Roderick Roxas	NUP

Team CARe LOve Pateros
Position	#	Name	Party
Vice mayor	3.	Carlo Santos	Nacionalista
For House of Representatives (1st District/Taguig-Pateros)	3.	Ricardo "Ading" Cruz Jr.	Nacionalista
Councilor (1st district)	2.	Elpidio "Edwin" Acosta Jr.	Nacionalista
Councilor (1st district)	15.	Eric Mabazza	Nacionalista
Councilor (1st district)	20.	Ryan Rey Panis	Nacionalista
Councilor (1st district)	25.	Milaor "Mil" Villegas	Nacionalista
Councilor (2nd district)	1.	Omar Alcantara	Nacionalista
Councilor (2nd district)	3.	Arthur "Atoy" Cortez	Nacionalista
Councilor (2nd district)	10.	Allan Dennis "Alden" Mangoba	Nacionalista
Councilor (2nd district)	17.	Jose Jonathan "Jojo" Sanchez	Nacionalista
Councilor (2nd district)	18.	Emmanuel "Emman" Tanga	Nacionalista

=== Other parties and independents ===
Position	#	Name	Party
House of Representatives (1st District/Taguig-Pateros)	1.	Lino Cayetano	NPC
House of Representatives (1st District/Taguig-Pateros)	4.	Pedro dela Cruz	Independent
House of Representatives (1st District/Taguig-Pateros)	5.	Ricardo Opoc	Independent
Councilor (1st district)	3.	Alifie Apan	Independent
Councilor (1st district)	5.	Adonis Bigas	Independent
Councilor (1st district)	6.	Delfin Cerada Jr.	Independent
Councilor (1st district)	9.	Rolando "Lando" Dolon	Independent
Councilor (1st district)	11.	Dante Legaspi	Independent
Councilor (1st district)	12.	Cesar Llagas	Independent
Councilor (1st district)	18.	Jorge "Jojo" Nicdao	Independent
Councilor (1st district)	22.	Romy Quinones	Independent
Councilor (1st district)	24.	Arnaldo Reyes	Independent
Councilor (2nd district)	14.	Marvin Ponce	Independent

== Mayoral election ==
The incumbent mayor is Ike Ponce, who was reelected for a third and final term in 2022, and is term-limited. He decided not to seek any elective post in the local election, instead running for Partylist Representative as the Second Nominee for the partylist group Ahon Mahirap. The race will be contested by former Vice Mayor and Municipal Administrator Gerald German of the Partido Federal ng Pilipinas, and incumbent councilor Ronnie S. Miranda of the National Unity Party.

=== Candidates ===
==== Declared ====
- Gerald German, municipal administrator (2022–2024) and former vice mayor (2013–2022)
- Ronnie S. Miranda, incumbent councilor (2022–present)

==== Withdrew ====
- Dominador Rosales Jr., incumbent councilor (2016–present)

=== Results ===
Pateros Mayoral Elections
Party	Candidate	Votes	%
PFP	Gerald German	16,459	55.87
NUP	Ronnie S. Miranda	13,001	44.13
Total votes		29,460	100.00
PFP gain from Aksyon			

==== Per Barangay ====
Barangay	German		Miranda		Total votes
Barangay	Votes	%	Votes	%	Total votes
Aguho	1,570	46.92	1,776	53.08	3,346
Magtanggol	449	44.32	564	55.68	1,013
Martires del 96	929	45.45	1,115	54.45	2,044
Poblacion	756	56.59	580	43.41	1,336
San Pedro	878	65.62	460	34.38	1,338
San Roque	1,132	55.74	899	44.26	2,031
Santa Ana	7,623	60.16	5,049	39.84	12,672
Santo Rosario-Kanluran	1,217	52.66	1,094	47.34	2,311
Santo Rosario-Silangan	1,133	59.98	756	40.02	1,889
Tabacalera	772	52.16	708	47.84	1,480
Total	16,459	55.87	13,001	44.13	29,460

== Vice mayoral election ==
The incumbent vice mayor is Carlo Santos, who is running for reelection to a second term. Santos won, defeating his rivals, John Peter Marzan of the National Unity Party, who lost the last election to the incumbent in 2022, and John Mendiola Cerafica of the Partido Federal ng Pilipinas.

=== Candidates ===
==== Declared ====
- Carlo Santos, incumbent vice mayor (2022–present)
- John Peter Marzan, former Liga ng mga Barangay President/ex-officio councilor, and 2022 vice mayoral candidate
- John Mendiola Cerafica, brother of congressional candidate Allan Cerafica and Taguig mayoral candidate Arnel Cerafica

=== Results ===
Pateros Vice Mayoral Elections
Party	Candidate	Votes	%
Nacionalista	Carlo Santos	15,678	53.94
NUP	John Peter Marzan	9,393	32.32
PFP	John Mendiola Cerafica	3,992	13.74
Total votes		29,063	100.00
Nacionalista hold			

==== Per Barangay ====
Barangay	Santos		Marzan		Cerafica	
Barangay	Votes	%	Votes	%	Votes	%
Aguho	1,621	49.26	1,281	38.92	389	11.82
Magtanggol	328	32.09	636	62.23	58	5.68
Martires del 96	980	48.66	731	36.30	303	15.04
Poblacion	842	63.34	339	25.53	147	11.07
San Pedro	882	66.67	307	23.20	134	10.13
San Roque	1,042	52.23	611	30.63	342	17.14
Santa Ana	6,537	52.57	3,807	30.62	2,090	16.81
Santo Rosario-Kanluran	1,406	61.40	663	28.95	221	9.65
Santo Rosario-Silangan	1,224	64.97	501	26.59	159	8.44
Tabacalera	816	55.06	517	34.89	149	10.05
Total	15,678	53.94	9,393	32.32	3,992	13.74

== House of Representatives election ==
=== Results ===
Congressional Elections in Taguig-Pateros Lone District
Party	Candidate	Votes	%
Nacionalista	Ricardo "Ading" Cruz Jr.	12,081	42.46
PFP	Allan Cerafica	8,787	30.89
NPC	Lino Cayetano	7,057	24.80
Independent	Pedro dela Cruz	405	1.42
Independent	Ricardo Opoc	120	0.42
Total votes		29,063	100.00
Nacionalista gain from PFP			

==== Per Barangay ====
Barangay	Cruz		Cerafica		Cayetano		Dela Cruz		Opoc	
Barangay	Votes	%	Votes	%	Votes	%	Votes	%	Votes	%
Aguho	1,317	40.66	722	22.29	1,163	35.91	28	0.86	9	0.28
Magtanggol	360	37.04	273	28.09	318	32.72	18	1.85	3	0.31
Martires del 96	766	38.84	641	32.51	532	26.98	25	1.27	8	0.41
Poblacion	645	49.58	298	22.91	336	25.83	20	1.54	2	0.15
San Pedro	671	52.10	347	26.94	260	20.19	8	0.62	2	0.16
San Roque	721	36.77	672	34.27	539	27.49	24	1.22	5	0.25
Santa Ana	5,101	41.67	4,442	36.29	2,439	19.92	204	1.67	55	0.45
Santo Rosario-Kanluran	1,029	46.29	559	25.15	585	26.32	39	1.75	11	0.49
Santo Rosario-Silangan	884	48.84	451	24.92	425	23.48	30	1.66	20	1.10
Tabacalera	567	39.85	382	26.84	460	32.33	9	0.63	5	0.35
Total	12,081	42.46	8,787	30.89	7,057	24.80	405	1.42	120	0.42

== Municipal Council election ==
The Pateros Municipal Council is composed of 14 members, 12 of which are elected through plurality block voting to serve three-year terms. The councilors represent the municipality's two council districts.

Party or alliance		Votes	%	Seats
Nacionalista Party		48,295	32.73	8
Team Good Governance Pateros	Partido Federal ng Pilipinas	40,216	27.25	2
Team Good Governance Pateros	Katipunan ng Nagkakaisang Pilipino	4,617	3.13	1
Team Good Governance Pateros	Total	44,833	30.38	3
National Unity Party		37,442	25.37	1
Independent		16,990	11.51	0
Ex officio seats				2
Total		147,560	100.00	14

=== First District ===
2025 Pateros Municipal Council elections in the 1st district
Party	Candidate	Votes	%
PFP	Allan Dela Cruz	7,428	42.79
PFP	Nestito "Don" Ponce Jr.	6,516	37.53
NUP	Jay Mabanglo	6,108	35.18
Nacionalista	Elpidio "Edwin" Acosta Jr.	6,032	34.75
Nacionalista	Milaor "Mil" Villegas	5,582	32.15
Nacionalista	Ryan Rey Panis	4,988	28.73
Independent	Adonis "Don Rice" Bigas	4,740	27.30
Nacionalista	Eric Mabazza	4,716	27.16
NUP	Johns "Hapon" Abiño	4,301	24.77
Independent	Jorge "Jojo" Nicdao	3,709	21.36
PFP	Leonila "Nene" Bermejo	3,423	19.72
NUP	Joseph "Monay" Manzon	3,204	18.46
PFP	Luis Augusto "Luigi" Marcelo	3,170	18.26
NUP	Ramir Ramirez	3,109	17.91
PFP	Oscar "Jon-Jon" Ongmanchi Jr.	3,020	17.40
NUP	Fernando "Ding" Datu	2,824	16.27
PFP	Ruel Gatpayat	2,696	15.53
Independent	Rolando "Lando" Dolon	2,584	14.88
Independent	Cesar Ilagas	1,289	7.42
NUP	Moner Luna	1,196	6.89
Independent	Alifie Apan	1,010	5.82
Independent	Romy Quiñones	652	3.76
Independent	Arnaldo "Aldy" Reyes	410	2.36
Independent	Dante Legaspi	369	2.13
Independent	Jun Cerada	276	1.59
Total votes		83,352	100.00

Party	Votes	%	Seats
Nacionalista Party	21,318	25.58	3
Partido Federal ng Pilipinas	26,253	31.50	2
National Unity Party	20,742	24.88	1
Independent	15,039	18.04	0
Total	83,352	100.00	6

=== Second District ===
2025 Pateros Municipal Council elections in the 2nd district
Party	Candidate	Votes	%
Nacionalista	Arthur "Atoy" Cortez	6,081	46.07
Nacionalista	Omar Alcantara	5,724	43.37
Nacionalista	Allan Dennis "Alden" Mangoba	5,625	42.62
Nacionalista	Emmanuel "Emman" Tañga	4,852	36.76
Nacionalista	Jose Jonathan "Jojo" Sanchez	4,695	35.57
KANP	Paul Argie Cruz	4,617	34.98
NUP	Rommel Lambino	4,461	33.80
PFP	Maria Kathleen "Ayie" Ampe	4,268	32.34
NUP	Richard Palican	3,795	28.75
PFP	Ian Ponce	3,086	23.38
NUP	Jun Ling	2,708	20.52
NUP	Arcangel "Joey" De Lara Jr.	2,607	19.75
PFP	Jonell Raymundo	2,387	18.09
PFP	John Lester "Teng" Joson	2,338	17.71
Independent	Marvin Ponce	1,951	14.78
PFP	Ryan-Thed "Ryan" Millares	1,884	14.27
NUP	Roderick Roxas	1,884	14.27
NUP	Ejercito "Chito" Lorenzo	1,245	9.43
Total votes		64,208	100.00

Party or alliance		Votes	%	Seats
Nacionalista Party		26,977	42.02	5
Team Good Governance Pateros	Partido Federal ng Pilipinas	13,963	21.75	0
Team Good Governance Pateros	Katipunan ng Nagkakaisang Pilipino	4,617	7.19	1
Team Good Governance Pateros	Total	18,580	28.94	1
National Unity Party		16,700	26.01	0
Independent		1,951	3.04	0
Total		64,208	100.00	6
