= 2019 Pateros local elections =

41st mayoral elections in Pateros

2019 Pateros mayoral elections
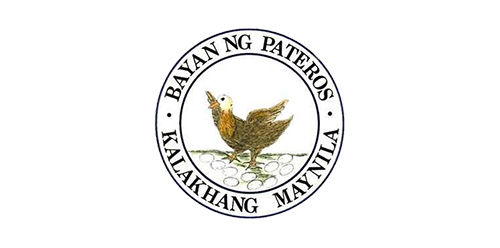
- May 13, 2019
- Turnout: 74.89% ▼7.41 pp
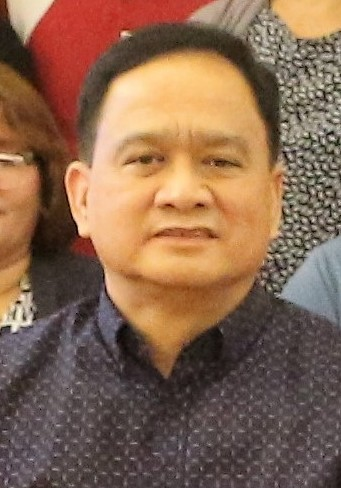
| Nominee | Miguel "Ike" Ponce III | Willie Buenaventura |
| Party | PDP–Laban | Nacionalista |
| Running mate | Gerald German | Carlo Santos |
| Popular vote | 18,370 | 8,775 |
| Percentage | 67.67% | 32.33% |
Mayor before election
Miguel "Ike" Ponce III
Liberal
Elected mayor
Miguel "Ike" Ponce III
PDP–Laban

Local elections in Pateros were held on May 13, 2019 within the Philippine general election. The voters elected for the elective local posts in the city: the mayor, vice mayor, district representative, and councilors, six in each of the municipality's two districts.

== Background ==
Mayor Miguel "Ike" Ponce III ran for re-election. His opponent was former Vice Mayor Willie Buenaventura, who happened to be his opponent last election.

Vice Mayor Gerald German ran for re-election for a third term. His opponent was Engr. Carlo Santos.

Taguig-Pateros Rep. Arnel Cerafica was term-limited, and chose to run for mayor of Taguig. His party chose Allan Cerafica, his brother. Cerafica was challenged by former Senator Alan Peter Cayetano, Gloria Cabrera, and Zaman Rajahmuda.

== Results ==
=== For Mayor ===
Mayor Miguel "Ike" Ponce III defeated his opponent, former Vice Mayor Willie Buenaventura for the second time.

Pateros Mayoralty Elections
| Party | Candidate | Votes | % |
|---|---|---|---|
| PDP–Laban | Miguel "Ike" Ponce III | 18,370 | 67.67 |
| Nacionalista | Willie Buenaventura | 8,775 | 32.33 |
| Total votes | | 27,145 | 100.00 |

==== Per Barangay ====
| Barangay | Ponce III | | Buenaventura | |
| Barangay | Votes | % | Votes | % |
|---|---|---|---|---|
| Aguho | 2,069 | 66.68 | 1,034 | 33.32 |
| Magtanggol | 654 | 73.40 | 237 | 26.60 |
| Martires del 96 | 1,447 | 73.23 | 529 | 26.77 |
| Poblacion | 829 | 61.14 | 527 | 38.86 |
| San Pedro | 979 | 77.95 | 277 | 22.05 |
| San Roque | 1,292 | 68.04 | 607 | 31.96 |
| Santa Ana | 7,907 | 69.13 | 3,531 | 30.87 |
| Santo Rosario-Kanluran | 1,397 | 68.05 | 656 | 31.95 |
| Santo Rosario-Silangan | 1,003 | 57.78 | 733 | 42.22 |
| Tabacalera | 793 | 55.18 | 644 | 44.82 |
| Total | 18,370 | 67.67 | 8,775 | 32.33 |

=== For Vice Mayor ===
Vice Mayor Gerald German managed to defeat his opponent Engr. Carlo Santos. German won over Santos with a margin of 2,871 votes.

Pateros Vice Mayoralty Elections
| Party | Candidate | Votes | % |
|---|---|---|---|
| PDP–Laban | Gerald German | 14,600 | 55.45 |
| Nacionalista | Carlo Santos | 11,729 | 44.55 |
| Total votes | | 26,329 | 100.00 |

==== Per Barangay ====
| Barangay | German | | Santos | |
| Barangay | Votes | % | Votes | % |
|---|---|---|---|---|
| Aguho | 1,561 | 52.56 | 1,409 | 47.44 |
| Magtanggol | 478 | 55.91 | 377 | 44.09 |
| Martires del 96 | 1,055 | 55.35 | 851 | 44.65 |
| Poblacion | 692 | 52.42 | 628 | 47.58 |
| San Pedro | 821 | 66.91 | 406 | 33.09 |
| San Roque | 1,109 | 60.67 | 719 | 39.33 |
| Santa Ana | 6,852 | 61.57 | 4,277 | 38.43 |
| Santo Rosario-Kanluran | 834 | 42.02 | 1,151 | 57.98 |
| Santo Rosario-Silangan | 605 | 35.46 | 1,101 | 64.54 |
| Tabacalera | 593 | 42.27 | 810 | 57.73 |
| Total | 14,600 | 55.45 | 11,729 | 44.55 |

=== For Representative, Taguig-Pateros Lone District ===
Allan Cerafica defeated former Senator Alan Peter Cayetano and other candidates in Pateros, but lost the congressional election to the latter.

Congressional Elections in Taguig-Pateros Lone District
| Party | Candidate | Votes | % |
|---|---|---|---|
| PDP–Laban | Allan Cerafica | 15,857 | 59.14 |
| Nacionalista | Alan Peter Cayetano | 10,750 | 40.09 |
| Independent | Gloria Cabrera | 192 | 0.72 |
| PFP | Zaman Rajahmuda | 13 | 0.05 |
| Total votes | | 26,812 | 100.00 |
| PDP–Laban hold | | | |

==== Per Barangay ====
| Barangay | Cerafica | | Cayetano | | Cabrera | | Rajahmuda | |
| Barangay | Votes | % | Votes | % | Votes | % | Votes | % |
|---|---|---|---|---|---|---|---|---|
| Aguho | 1,795 | 58.68 | 1,248 | 40.80 | 16 | 0.52 | 0 | 0.00 |
| Magtanggol | 570 | 65.44 | 291 | 33.41 | 9 | 1.03 | 1 | 0.11 |
| Martires del 96 | 1,237 | 63.18 | 698 | 35.65 | 23 | 1.17 | 0 | 0.00 |
| Poblacion | 686 | 51.27 | 646 | 48.28 | 6 | 0.45 | 0 | 0.00 |
| San Pedro | 824 | 66.24 | 415 | 33.36 | 5 | 0.40 | 0 | 0.00 |
| San Roque | 1,191 | 63.62 | 666 | 35.58 | 15 | 0.80 | 0 | 0.00 |
| Santa Ana | 7,020 | 61.96 | 4,224 | 37.28 | 78 | 0.69 | 8 | 0.07 |
| Santo Rosario-Kanluran | 1,076 | 53.64 | 912 | 45.46 | 16 | 0.80 | 2 | 0.10 |
| Santo Rosario-Silangan | 751 | 43.54 | 959 | 55.59 | 14 | 0.81 | 1 | 0.06 |
| Tabacalera | 707 | 50.18 | 691 | 49.04 | 10 | 0.71 | 1 | 0.07 |
| Total | 15,857 | 59.14 | 10,750 | 40.09 | 192 | 0.72 | 13 | 0.05 |

=== For Councilors ===
Incumbent councilors are in italics.

| Party | Votes | % | Seats |
|---|---|---|---|
| PDP-Laban | 71,580 | 52.49 | 9 |
| Nacionalista Party | 44,589 | 32.70 | 3 |
| Independent | 20,198 | 14.81 | 0 |
| Ex-officio seats | | | 2 |
| Total | 136,367 | 100.00 | 14 |

==== First District ====
Municipal Council Elections in Pateros' First District
| Party | Candidate | Votes | % |
|---|---|---|---|
| PDP–Laban | Beatriz "Betty" Santos | 7,713 | 48.96 |
| PDP–Laban | Jorge "Jojo" Nicdao | 7,205 | 45.73 |
| PDP–Laban | Lauro "Larry" Capco | 7,197 | 45.68 |
| PDP–Laban | Napoleon "Nap" Dionisio Jr. | 7,043 | 44.70 |
| PDP–Laban | Johns "Hapon" Abiño | 6,494 | 41.22 |
| PDP–Laban | Dominador "Ador" Rosales, Jr. | 6,445 | 40.91 |
| Nacionalista | Ryan Rey Panis | 5,443 | 34.55 |
| Independent | Joseph "Monay" Manzon | 4,751 | 30.16 |
| Nacionalista | Rolando "Lando" Dolon | 4,171 | 26.47 |
| Nacionalista | Oscar "Jonjon" Ongmanchi Jr. | 3,910 | 24.82 |
| Independent | Edmundo de Borja | 3,613 | 22.93 |
| Nacionalista | Severino "Boyet" Dela Cruz | 3,369 | 21.38 |
| Independent | Alfeo "Al" Castillo | 2,822 | 17.91 |
| Nacionalista | Fernando "Nanding" Lazaro | 2,408 | 15.28 |
| Nacionalista | Romeo "Romy" Pineda | 1,917 | 12.17 |
| Independent | Renald Dizon | 1,359 | 8.63 |
| Independent | Ferdinand Guiling | 853 | 5.41 |
| Independent | Dante Legaspi | 367 | 2.33 |
| Total votes | | 77,080 | 100.00 |

==== Second District ====
Municipal Council Elections in Pateros' Second District
| Party | Candidate | Votes | % |
|---|---|---|---|
| PDP–Laban | Ericson "Bojic" Raymundo | 6,065 | 50.00 |
| PDP–Laban | Joven Gatpayat | 5,520 | 45.51 |
| Nacionalista | Jose Jonathan "Jojo" Sanchez | 5,479 | 45.17 |
| PDP–Laban | Ernesto "Totong" Cortez | 5,409 | 44.59 |
| Nacionalista | Jeric Reyes | 5,115 | 42.17 |
| Nacionalista | Allan Dennis "Alden" Mangoba | 4,999 | 41.21 |
| PDP–Laban | Ernesto "Erning" Ampe | 4,801 | 39.58 |
| PDP–Laban | Jocelyn Dayco | 4,101 | 33.81 |
| Nacionalista | Jowell Raymundo | 3,938 | 32.45 |
| PDP–Laban | Ramon Roxas | 3,587 | 29.57 |
| Independent | Jun Ling | 2,678 | 22.08 |
| Independent | Fernando "Totoy" Maravilla | 2,129 | 17.55 |
| Nacionalista | Gerry del Rosario | 2,092 | 17.25 |
| Nacionalista | Fely Alvarez | 1,748 | 14.41 |
| Independent | Alma Otero | 1,626 | 13.40 |
| Total votes | | 59,287 | 100.00 |
