= Ike Ponce =

Filipino politician (born 1959)

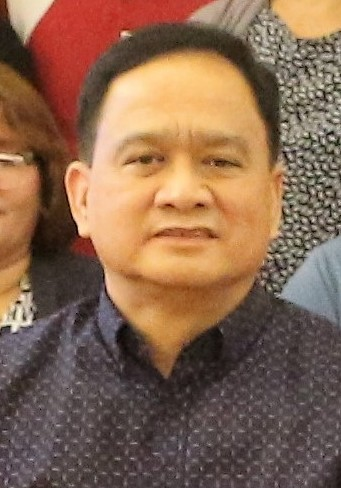

Mayor of Pateros
- In office June 30, 2016 – June 30, 2025
- Vice Mayor: Gerald German (2016–2022); Carlo Santos (2022–2025)
- Preceded by: Joey Medina
- Succeeded by: Gerald German

Personal details
- Born: Miguel Fernando Ponce III; June 15, 1959 (age 66) Pateros, Rizal, Philippines
- Party: Aksyon (2021–present)
- Other political affiliations: PDP–Laban (2018–2021); Liberal (before 2018)
- Occupation: Politician

Miguel "Ike" Fernando Ponce III (June 15, 1959) is a Filipino politician who served as Mayor of Pateros from 2016 to 2025.

== Political career ==
Ponce ran for mayor in 2001 but lost to Rosendo Capco, the son of then-mayor José "Pepe" Capco, Jr., he ran again for a second attempt in 2013 under the Liberal Party but lost again, this time to reelectionist Joey Medina.

In 2016, with incumbent vice mayor Gerald German as his running mate, he finally won the election. In 2019, he run for his second term with German again as his running mate, and they won again.

In 2022, while running for a third-term, he tapped John Peter Marzan as his running mate, as German was now term-limited. He also supported the presidential run of another metro Mayor Isko Moreno. Ponce got his third and final term as mayor, as he overwhelmingly defeated his opponent, Marilyn Chiong. He won in a landslide election to Chiong with a margin of 25,757 votes.

In 2025, Ponce was the second nominee of Ahon Mahirap partylist. However, the partylist failed to secure a seat in the 20th Congress.

== Electoral performance ==
=== 2022 ===
Pateros Mayoralty Elections
Party	Candidate	Votes	%
Aksyon	Miguel "Ike" Ponce III	28,534	91.13%
Independent	Marilyn Ison Chiong	2,777	8.87%
Total votes		31,311	100.00%
Aksyon hold			

=== 2019 ===
Pateros Mayoralty Elections
Party	Candidate	Votes	%
PDP–Laban	Miguel "Ike" Ponce III	18,370	67.67%
Nacionalista	Willie Buenaventura	8,775	32.33%
Total votes		27,145	100.00%

=== 2016 ===
Pateros Mayoralty Elections
Party	Candidate	Votes	%
Liberal	Miguel "Ike" Ponce III	9,760	36.24%
Independent	Daisy Reyes	8,444	31.35%
Nacionalista	Willie Buenaventura	6,436	23.90%
NPC	Jorge "Jojo" Nicdao	1,613	5.99%
Aksyon	Ramon Roxas	590	2.19%
Partido Bagong Maharlika	Delfin Dela Rosa	89	0.33%
Margin of victory		1,316	4.89%
Total votes		26,932	100.00%

=== 2013 ===
Pateros Mayoralty Elections
Party	Candidate	Votes	%
Nacionalista	Jaime “Joey” Medina	12,886	
Liberal	Miguel "Ike" Ponce III	12,284	
Total votes		25,170	
