= 2016 Pateros local elections =

40th mayoral elections in Pateros

2016 Pateros mayoral elections
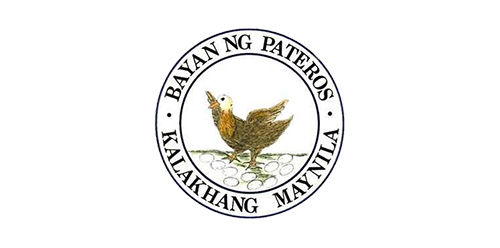
- May 9, 2016
- Turnout: 82.3%
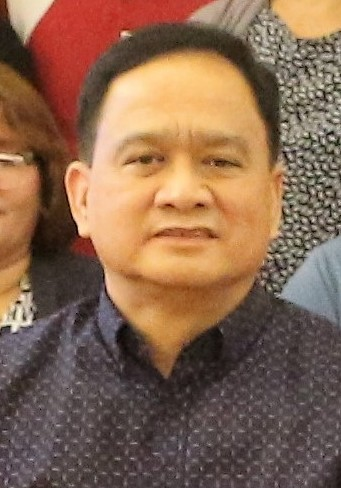
Nominee	Miguel "Ike" Ponce III	Daisy Reyes
Party	Liberal	Independent
Running mate	Gerald German
Popular vote	9,760	8,444
Percentage	36.24%	31.35%
Nominee	Willie Buenaventura	Jorge "Jojo" Nicdao
Party	Nacionalista	NPC
Running mate	Ma. Theresa "Bebot" Cuerdo	Elmer Mangoba
Popular vote	6,436	1,613
Percentage	23.90%	5.99%
Mayor before election
Jaime "Joey" Medina
Nacionalista
Elected mayor
Miguel "Ike" Ponce III
Liberal

Local elections in Pateros were held on May 9, 2016 within the Philippine general election. The voters elected for the elective local posts in the municipality: the mayor, vice mayor, district representative, and councilors, six in each of the municipality's two districts.

== Background ==
Mayor Jaime "Joey" C. Medina was term-limited. His party chose former Vice Mayor and Councilor Willie Buenaventura, who ran as Mayor before in 2004 but lost to re-electionist Mayor Rosendo Capco. His opponents were Miguel "Ike" Ponce III, the son of former Vice Mayor Mike Ponce and grandson of former Mayor Antonino Ponce, of the Liberal Party who was Medina's opponent in 2013, First District Councilor Jorge "Jojo" Nicdao of the Nationalist People's Coalition, Ramon Roxas of Aksyon Demokratiko, beauty queen-turned-actress and Second District Councilor Daisy Reyes, and Delfin Dela Rosa. Reyes and Dela Rosa were both running independently.

Vice Mayor Gerald German ran for re-election for a second term. His opponents were Bebot Cuerdo, Elmer Mangoba and Venancio Santidad.

Taguig-Pateros Rep. Arnel Cerafica ran for re-election for third and final term. His opponent was Gloria Cabrera.

== Results ==
=== For Representative, Taguig-Pateros Lone District ===
Rep. Arnel Cerafica overwhelmingly defeated his opponent, Gloria Cabrera.

Congressional Elections in Taguig-Pateros Lone District
Party	Candidate	Votes	%
Liberal	Arnel Cerafica	21,811	94.59
Partido Bagong Maharlika	Gloria Cabrera	1,247	5.41
Total votes		23,058	100.00%

=== Mayor ===
Miguel "Ike" Ponce narrowly defeated his closest opponent, 2nd District Councilor Daisy Reyes by a margin of 4.89%.

Pateros Mayoralty Elections
Party	Candidate	Votes	%
Liberal	Miguel "Ike" Ponce III	9,760	36.24
Independent	Daisy Reyes	8,444	31.35
Nacionalista	Willie Buenaventura	6,436	23.90
NPC	Jorge "Jojo" Nicdao	1,613	5.99
Aksyon	Ramon Roxas	590	2.19
Partido Bagong Maharlika	Delfin Dela Rosa	89	0.33
Margin of victory		1,316	4.89
Total votes		26,932	100.00

==== Per Barangay ====
Barangay	Ponce III		Reyes		Buenaventura		Nicdao		Roxas		Dela Rosa	
Barangay	Votes	%	Votes	%	Votes	%	Votes	%	Votes	%	Votes	%
Aguho	1,152	37.27	790	25.56	950	30.73	88	2.85	101	3.27	10	0.32
Magtanggol	223	24.78	272	30.22	204	22.67	32	3.56	169	18.78	0	0.00
Martires del 96	599	29.85	833	41.50	401	19.98	147	7.32	22	1.10	5	0.25
Poblacion	491	36.89	351	26.37	392	29.45	81	6.09	16	1.20	0	0.00
San Pedro	611	49.55	246	19.95	288	23.36	64	5.19	21	1.70	3	0.24
San Roque	704	37.85	637	34.25	410	22.04	89	4.78	15	0.81	5	0.27
Santa Ana	4,195	37.04	3,446	30.43	2,523	22.28	925	8.17	175	1.55	61	0.54
Santo Rosario-Kanluran	713	34.85	825	40.32	431	21.07	52	2.54	22	1.08	3	0.15
Santo Rosario-Silangan	546	32.33	635	37.60	423	25.04	61	3.61	23	1.36	1	0.06
Tabacalera	526	36.28	409	28.21	414	28.55	74	5.10	26	1.79	1	0.07
Total	9,760	36.24	8,444	31.35	6,436	23.90	1,613	5.99	590	2.19	89	0.33

=== Vice Mayor ===
Vice Mayor Gerald German was re-elected to a second term, defeating his closest opponent, Bebot Cuerdo by 27.28%.

Pateros Vice Mayoralty Elections
Party	Candidate	Votes	%
Liberal	Gerald German	12,533	50.01
Nacionalista	Ma. Theresa "Bebot" Cuerdo	5,695	22.73
Independent	Venancio "Benny" Santidad	3,943	15.73
NPC	Elmer "Bojie" Mangoba	2,888	11.52
Total votes		25,059	100.00

==== Per Barangay ====
Barangay	German		Cuerdo		Santidad		Mangoba	
Barangay	Votes	%	Votes	%	Votes	%	Votes	%
Aguho	1,387	49.80	829	29.77	212	7.61	357	12.82
Magtanggol	304	37.25	253	31.00	144	17.65	115	14.09
Martires del 96	858	47.07	465	25.51	261	14.32	239	13.11
Poblacion	536	43.68	391	31.87	161	13.12	139	11.33
San Pedro	521	44.91	451	38.88	45	3.88	143	12.33
San Roque	949	55.89	280	16.49	312	18.37	157	9.25
Santa Ana	6,097	56.90	1,780	16.61	2,155	20.11	684	6.38
Santo Rosario-Kanluran	721	37.75	430	22.51	157	8.22	602	31.52
Santo Rosario-Silangan	598	38.14	443	28.25	316	20.25	211	13.46
Tabacalera	562	41.45	373	27.51	180	13.27	241	17.77
Total	12,533	50.01	5,695	22.73	3,943	15.73	2,888	11.52

=== For Councilors ===
Incumbent councilors are in italics.

Party	Votes	%	Seats
Liberal Party	48,202	36.10	5
Nacionalista Party	40,418	30.27	5
Nationalist People's Coalition	18,061	13.53	0
Independent	26,834	20.10	2
Ex-officio seats			2
Total	133,515	100.00	14

==== First District ====
Municipal Council Elections in Pateros' First District
Party	Candidate	Votes	%
Liberal	Lauro "Larry" Capco	6,464	40.98
Liberal	Allan Dela Cruz	6,001	38.05
Nacionalista	Beatriz "Betty" Santos	5,632	35.71
Nacionalista	Milaor "Mil" Villegas	5,233	33.18
Independent	Dominador "Ador" Rosales Jr.	5,001	31.71
Liberal	Napoleon "Nap" Dionisio Jr.	4,840	30.69
Liberal	Rosario "Connie" Muñoz	4,721	29.93
Independent	Joseph "Monay" Manzon	4,029	25.55
Nacionalista	Rolando "Lando" Dolon	3,718	23.57
Nacionalista	Josefina "Jossie" Acoilla	3,321	21.06
NPC	Oscar "Jon-Jon" Ongmanchi, Jr.	3,217	20.40
Independent	Johns "Hapon" Abiño	2,847	18.05
Liberal	Roberto Luna	2,814	17.84
Liberal	Baltazar "Bal" Roden	2,604	16.51
NPC	Wilshie Santos	2,545	16.14
NPC	Edmundo De Borja	2,342	14.85
NPC	Laurence Saez	1,425	9.04
NPC	Arnaldo Reyes	1,241	7.87
Independent	Ferdinand Guiling	1,064	6.75
Nacionalista	Jaime "Jimmy" Flores	1,050	6.66
NPC	Damaso Hernandez	982	6.23
Nacionalista	Antonio Villanueva	944	5.99
Independent	Leandro Deveza	762	4.83
Independent	Nora Macinas	730	4.63
Independent	Genaro Julian	626	3.97
Independent	Laura Arellano	480	3.04
Independent	Ligaya Metiam	219	1.39
Independent	Alfredo Redoban Jr.	197	1.25
Total votes		75,049	100.00

==== Second District ====
Municipal Council Elections in Pateros' Second District
Party	Candidate	Votes	%
Nacionalista	Jose Jonathan "Jojo" Sanchez	4,810	39.56
Nacionalista	Maria Kathleen "Ayie" Ampe	4,675	38.45
Liberal	Ericson "Bojic" Raymundo	4,326	35.58
Nacionalista	Jeric Reyes	3,790	31.17
Independent	Jowell Raymundo	3,784	31.12
Liberal	Joven Gatpayat	3,767	30.98
Liberal	Edgar Noel Castillo	3,727	30.65
Liberal	Rommel Lambino	3,475	28.58
Nacionalista	Jose Chito Buenaventura	3,448	28.36
Liberal	Marvin Ponce	3,070	25.25
Nacionalista	Susano Bihag Jr.	2,697	22.18
Independent	Arcangel De Lara	2,622	21.56
Liberal	Jose Gonzales	2,393	19.68
Independent	Alvin Sandigan	1,849	15.21
NPC	Julio Ungco Jr.	1,370	11.27
NPC	Nilo Cruz	1,116	9.18
Independent	Ester Nicdao	1,100	9.05
Nacionalista	Edgardo Labine	1,100	9.05
NPC	Ronillo Enriquez	1,075	8.84
NPC	Ernani Villanueva	987	8.12
Independent	Epipfanio Gatpayat	973	8.00
NPC	Rowell Dizon	937	7.71
NPC	Jan Genato	824	6.78
Independent	Angelito Yari	371	3.05
Independent	Arturo Arancel	180	1.48
Total votes		58,466	100.00
