= 2022 Pateros local elections =

42nd mayoral elections in Pateros

2022 Pateros mayoral election
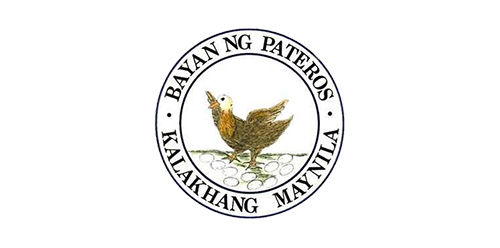
- May 9, 2022
- Turnout: 84.66% ▲9.77 pp
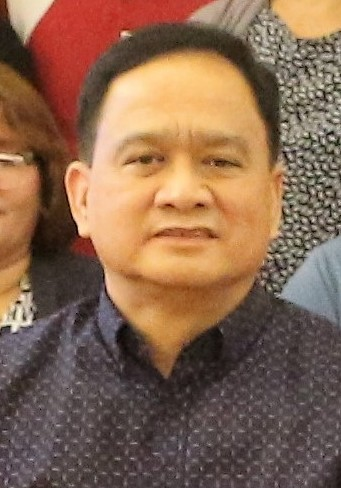
| Nominee | Miguel "Ike" Ponce III | Marilyn Ison Chiong |
| Party | Aksyon | Independent |
| Running mate | John Peter Marzan |
| Popular vote | 28,534 | 2,777 |
| Percentage | 91.13% | 8.87% |
Mayor before election
Miguel "Ike" Ponce III
PDP–Laban
Elected mayor
Miguel "Ike" Ponce III
Aksyon
- Vice mayoral election
| Candidate | Carlo Santos | John Peter Marzan |
| Party | Nacionalista | Aksyon |
| Popular vote | 16,856 | 14,227 |
| Percentage | 54.23% | 45.77% |
Vice Mayor before election
Gerald German
PDP–Laban
Elected Vice Mayor
Carlo Santos
Nacionalista

Local elections were held in Pateros on May 9, 2022, as a part of the Philippine general election. The voters elected local elective posts in the municipality: the mayor, vice mayor, district representative of Pateros-Taguig, and councilors, six in each of the city's two legislative districts.

== Background ==
Mayor Miguel "Ike" Ponce III ran for re-election for a third term. Independent candidate Marilyn Ison Chiong faced Ponce for the top post in Pateros.

Vice Mayor Gerald German was term-limited. His party nominated ex-officio councilor and Pateros' Liga ng Barangay President, Brgy. Magtanggol Chairman John Peter Marzan for the slot. Marzan was challenged by Engr. Carlo Santos. Santos lost the last election to German.

Although eligible to run for a second term, Taguig-Pateros Rep. Alan Peter Cayetano chose to run for the senate instead. His party chose outgoing Taguig Vice Mayor Ricardo "Ading" Cruz Jr. Cruz was challenged by Allan Cerafica, former Rep. Arnel Cerafica's brother. Allan Cerafica had lost the last election to Cayetano.

== Results ==
=== For Mayor ===
Mayor Miguel "Ike" Ponce III overwhelmingly defeated his opponent, Marilyn Chiong. Ponce won in a landslide election to Chiong with a margin of 25,757 votes.

Pateros Mayoralty Elections
| Party | Candidate | Votes | % |
|---|---|---|---|
| Aksyon | Miguel "Ike" Ponce III | 28,534 | 91.13% |
| Independent | Marilyn Ison Chiong | 2,777 | 8.87% |
| Total votes | | 31,311 | 100.00% |
| Aksyon hold | | | |

==== Per Barangay ====
| Barangay | Ponce III | | Chiong | |
| Barangay | Votes | % | Votes | % |
|---|---|---|---|---|
| Aguho | 3,352 | 95.09 | 173 | 4.91 |
| Magtanggol | 942 | 92.63 | 75 | 7.37 |
| Martires del 96 | 1,932 | 87.70 | 271 | 12.30 |
| Poblacion | 1,335 | 94.35 | 80 | 5.65 |
| San Pedro | 1,331 | 93.73 | 89 | 6.27 |
| San Roque | 2,020 | 90.87 | 203 | 9.13 |
| Santa Ana | 11,855 | 88.24 | 1,580 | 11.76 |
| Santo Rosario-Kanluran | 2,336 | 95.04 | 122 | 4.96 |
| Santo Rosario-Silangan | 1,932 | 94.38 | 115 | 5.62 |
| Tabacalera | 1,499 | 95.60 | 69 | 4.40 |
| Total | 28,534 | 91.13 | 2,777 | 8.87 |

=== For Vice Mayor ===
Engr. Carlo Santos won, defeating his rival, Pateros' Liga ng Barangay President, ex-officio councilor John Peter Marzan by 2,629 votes, with a margin of nearly 8.5 points. Santos lost to German in the same race last elections.

Pateros Vice Mayoralty Elections
| Party | Candidate | Votes | % |
|---|---|---|---|
| Nacionalista | Carlo Santos | 16,856 | 54.23% |
| Aksyon | John Peter Marzan | 14,227 | 45.77% |
| Total votes | | 31,083 | 100.00% |
| Nacionalista gain from PDP–Laban | | | |

==== Per Barangay ====
| Barangay | Santos | | Marzan | |
| Barangay | Votes | % | Votes | % |
|---|---|---|---|---|
| Aguho | 1,817 | 52.36 | 1,653 | 47.64 |
| Magtanggol | 253 | 24.37 | 785 | 75.63 |
| Martires del 96 | 1,224 | 56.88 | 928 | 43.12 |
| Poblacion | 743 | 52.51 | 672 | 47.49 |
| San Pedro | 715 | 51.11 | 684 | 48.89 |
| San Roque | 1,253 | 57.40 | 930 | 42.60 |
| Santa Ana | 7,225 | 54.21 | 6,103 | 45.79 |
| Santo Rosario-Kanluran | 1,290 | 52.98 | 1,145 | 47.02 |
| Santo Rosario-Silangan | 1,403 | 67.16 | 686 | 32.84 |
| Tabacalera | 933 | 59.28 | 641 | 40.72 |
| Total | 16,856 | 54.23 | 14,227 | 45.77 |

=== For Representative, Taguig-Pateros Lone District ===
Allan Cerafica, brother of former Rep. Arnel Cerafica defeated outgoing Taguig Vice Mayor Ricardo "Ading" Cruz Jr. in Pateros but lost the congressional election to the latter.

Congressional Elections in Taguig-Pateros Lone District
| Party | Candidate | Votes | % |
|---|---|---|---|
| PPP | Allan Cerafica | 19,640 | 63.88% |
| Nacionalista | Ricardo "Ading" Cruz Jr. | 11,105 | 36.12% |
| Total votes | | 30,745 | 100.00% |
| PPP hold | | | |

==== Per Barangay ====
| Barangay | Cerafica | | Cruz, Jr. | |
| Barangay | Votes | % | Votes | % |
|---|---|---|---|---|
| Aguho | 1,855 | 53.34 | 1,623 | 46.66 |
| Magtanggol | 706 | 70.88 | 290 | 29.12 |
| Martires del 96 | 1,393 | 64.31 | 773 | 35.69 |
| Poblacion | 738 | 53.17 | 650 | 46.83 |
| San Pedro | 828 | 59.27 | 569 | 40.73 |
| San Roque | 1,435 | 65.68 | 750 | 34.32 |
| Santa Ana | 9,241 | 69.94 | 3,972 | 30.06 |
| Santo Rosario-Kanluran | 1,569 | 65.59 | 823 | 34.41 |
| Santo Rosario-Silangan | 1,082 | 54.67 | 897 | 45.33 |
| Tabacalera | 793 | 51.13 | 758 | 48.87 |
| Total | 19,640 | 63.88 | 11,105 | 36.12 |

=== For Councilors ===
| Party or alliance | | Votes | % | Seats |
|---|---|---|---|---|
| Team AIP | Aksyon Demokratiko | 62,410 | 38.42 | 6 |
| Team AIP | Partido Pilipino sa Pagbabago | 13,537 | 8.33 | 2 |
| Team AIP | Total | 75,947 | 46.75 | 8 |
| Nacionalista Party | | 59,831 | 36.83 | 4 |
| Aksyon Demokratiko | | 6,552 | 4.03 | 0 |
| Partido Federal ng Pilipinas | | 4,473 | 2.75 | 0 |
| Partido Demokratiko Sosyalista ng Pilipinas | | 832 | 0.51 | 0 |
| Independent | | 14,826 | 9.13 | 0 |
| Ex officio seats | | | | 2 |
| Total | | 162,461 | 100.00 | 14 |

==== First District ====
Municipal Council Elections in Pateros' First District
| Party | Candidate | Votes | % |
|---|---|---|---|
| Aksyon | Allan Dela Cruz | 9,488 | 50.09 |
| Aksyon | Johns "Hapon" Abiño | 8,119 | 42.86 |
| PPP | Jay Mabanglo | 7,865 | 41.52 |
| Aksyon | Napoleon "Nap" Dionisio Jr. | 7,208 | 38.05 |
| Aksyon | Dominador "Ador" Rosales Jr. | 6,590 | 34.79 |
| Nacionalista | Milaor "Mil" Villegas | 6,581 | 34.74 |
| Aksyon | Jorge "Jojo" Nicdao | 6,552 | 34.59 |
| Nacionalista | Joseph "Monay" Manzon | 6,533 | 34.49 |
| Aksyon | Cesar Llagas | 5,463 | 28.84 |
| Nacionalista | Eric Mabazza | 5,268 | 27.92 |
| Nacionalista | Leonila "Nene" Bermejo | 4,750 | 25.08 |
| PFP | Oscar "Jonjon" Ongmanchi Jr. | 4,473 | 23.61 |
| Nacionalista | Rolando "Lando" Dolon | 4,257 | 22.47 |
| Independent | Jose Percival Capco Jr. | 3,838 | 20.26 |
| Independent | Alberto "Doy" Dela Cruz | 2,853 | 15.06 |
| Nacionalista | Moner Luna | 1,560 | 8.24 |
| Independent | Arnaldo "Aldy" Reyes | 1,235 | 6.52 |
| Total votes | | 92,633 | 100.00 |

| Party or alliance | | Votes | % | Seats |
|---|---|---|---|---|
| Team AIP | Aksyon Demokratiko | 36,868 | 39.80 | 4 |
| Team AIP | Partido Pilipino sa Pagbabago | 7,865 | 8.49 | 1 |
| Team AIP | Total | 44,733 | 48.29 | 5 |
| Nacionalista Party | | 28,949 | 31.25 | 1 |
| Aksyon Demokratiko | | 6,552 | 7.07 | 0 |
| Partido Federal ng Pilipinas | | 4,473 | 4.83 | 0 |
| Independent | | 7,926 | 8.56 | 0 |
| Total | | 92,633 | 100.00 | 6 |

==== Second District ====
Municipal Council Elections in Pateros' Second District
| Party | Candidate | Votes | % |
|---|---|---|---|
| Aksyon | Ericson "Bojic" Raymundo | 7,225 | 50.50 |
| Nacionalista | Ronaldo "Ronnie" Miranda | 6,733 | 47.06 |
| Nacionalista | Jeric Reyes | 6,305 | 44.07 |
| Nacionalista | Allan Denis "Alden" Mangoba | 6,192 | 43.28 |
| Aksyon | Maria Kathleen "Ayie" Ampe | 5,691 | 39.78 |
| PPP | Joven Gatpayat | 5,672 | 39.65 |
| Aksyon | Ernesto "Totong" Cortez | 5,270 | 36.84 |
| Nacionalista | Marvin Sanchez | 5,089 | 35.57 |
| Independent | Rommel Lambino | 4,808 | 33.61 |
| Aksyon | Jun Ling | 3,870 | 27.05 |
| Nacionalista | Jowell Raymundo | 3,668 | 25.64 |
| Aksyon | Ramon Roxas | 3,486 | 24.37 |
| Nacionalista | Fernando "Totoy" Maravilla | 2,895 | 20.24 |
| Independent | Serafino "Sonny" Santos | 1,704 | 11.91 |
| PDSP | Bernardeth Pastrana | 832 | 5.82 |
| Independent | Ian Gutierrez | 388 | 2.71 |
| Total votes | | 69,828 | 100.00 |

| Party or alliance | | Votes | % | Seats |
|---|---|---|---|---|
| Team AIP | Aksyon Demokratiko | 25,542 | 36.58 | 2 |
| Team AIP | Partido Pilipino sa Pagbabago | 5,672 | 8.12 | 1 |
| Team AIP | Total | 31,214 | 44.70 | 3 |
| Nacionalista Party | | 30,882 | 44.23 | 3 |
| Partido Demokratiko Sosyalista ng Pilipinas | | 832 | 1.19 | 0 |
| Independent | | 6,900 | 9.88 | 0 |
| Total | | 69,828 | 100.00 | 6 |
