= Santa Marta de Pateros =

19th-century Philippine apparition of a saint

Santa Marta de Pateros Rosas ng Pateros
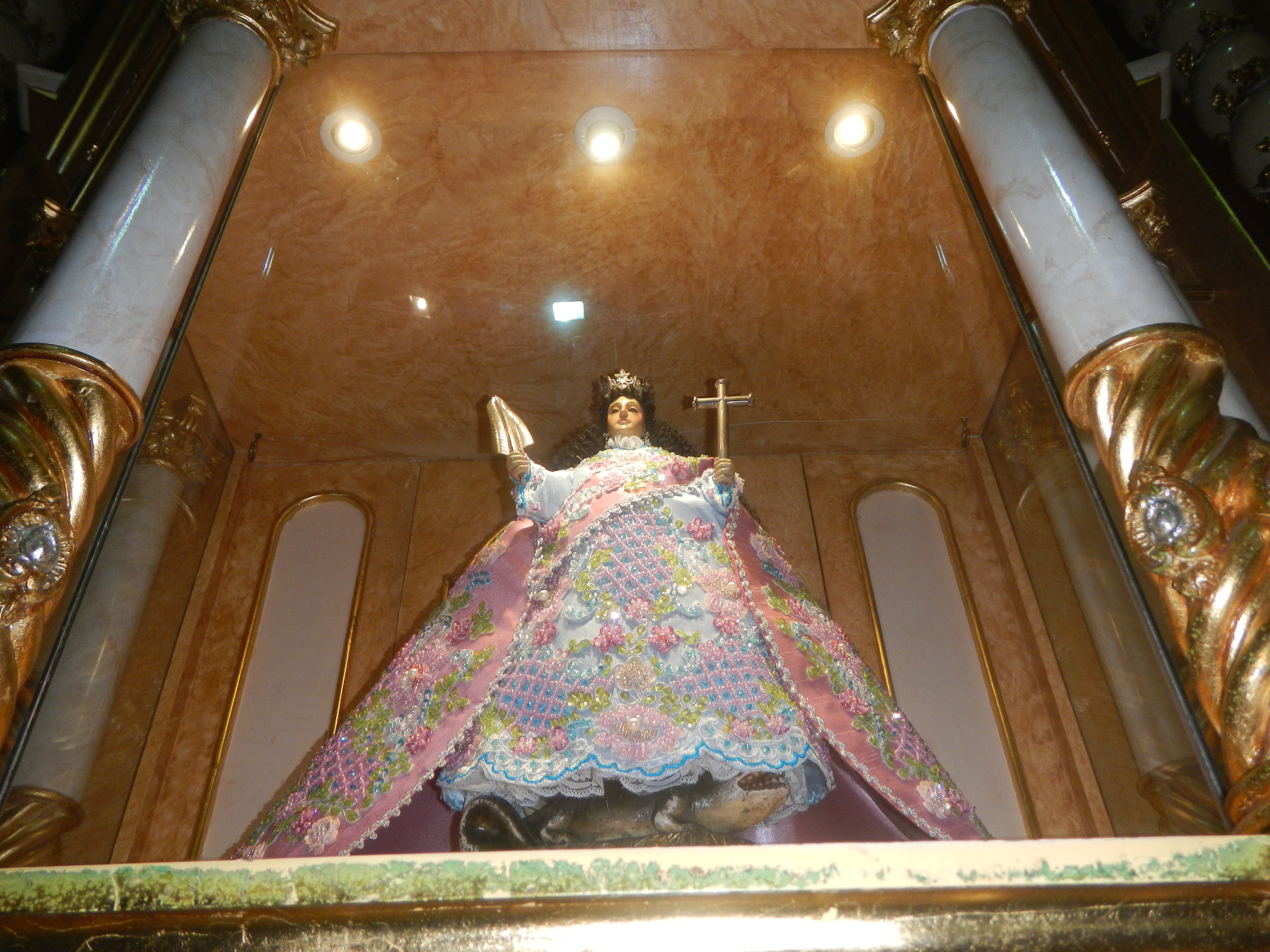
- The original image of Saint Martha of Pateros
- Venerated in: Catholic Church
- Major shrine: Diocesan Shrine of Saint Martha, Parish of Saint Roch, Pateros, Philippines
- Feast: Second Sunday of February (Pateros); July 29 (universal Church)
- Attributes: A palm branch in the right hand, cross on left, crocodile under her feet, diadem, sash
- Patronage: People of Pateros, duck raisers

Santa Marta de Pateros is a title given to the Biblical saint, Martha of Bethany, attributed to a 19th-century apparition of the saint in the town of Pateros, (formerly known as Aguho and once considered a visita of Pasig) in Metro Manila, Philippines.

== Legend ==
The devotion to Santa Marta de Pateros traces its roots to primeval beliefs in a water goddess. Tradition recounts that in the 1800s, Saint Martha (who legendarily subdued the Tarasque), was invoked by the people of Pateros to vanquish a crocodile in the Pateros River that ate their ducks. These animals were the main source of the townspeople's livelihood as their eggs are the main ingredient of the delicacy of Balút (fertilised duck egg), which is what the town is known for. In Tagalog, the Spanish loanword for duck is pato; and those who raise ducks are called pateros. At that time, domestic ducks (whose eggs produced balut) were abundant in the local river.

One evening, under a full moon, an unnamed female bayani (hero) went to the river to tame the creature. At the river banks, the crocodile saw a light surrounding the figure, who was actually Saint Martha. At the sight of the glowing figure, the creature disappeared and the local duck industry once again flourished. The people of Pateros attributed this event to Saint Martha and a grand fluvial procession in honor of her has been held yearly since, in remembrance of the event.

== Feast ==
Bone relic of Saint Martha

Formerly, the local feast in honor of Santa Marta de Pateros was variously celebrated in either January, February, or March. Her devotees, as a collegial body, determined the exact date of the feast within these months based on the abundance of balút eggs and the rice harvest, and whether the date coincided with the full moon needed to illuminate the nighttime Pagoda sa Ilog (fluvial procession) as there was no electricity.

In the 1960s, the date was fixed to second Sunday of February to standardise the fiesta following economic and environmental changes to the town. It is also said that during this period, the then-parish priest Monsignor Sicat moved the celebration to July 29, Saint Martha’s liturgical feast in the rest of the Catholic Church.

=== Pamisa de Gracia ===
The Pamisa de Gracia (Tagalog-Spanish for “Mass of Grace”) is a ritual and Mass that begins every town fiesta. The Pamisa is done to give thanks for a miracle, birthday, or anniversary obtained or sustained through Saint Martha’s intercession. The family who will organize one borrows the icons of Saints Martha, Roch, and Isidore the Laborer from the houses of their respective camareros and camareras (literally “chamberlains”, the term for the official caretaker of a Santo).

A sunduan (“fetching”) procession for the images begins on a Friday at the house of the caretaker of Saint Isidore’s icon. A brass band accompanies the image and procession, which proceeds to collect the image of Saint Roch from its caretaker’s house, then fetching Saint Martha’s icon. On the next day, Saturday, the host family conducts a prayer vigil at their house, where the icons are enshrined. On Sunday, the host family removes the three icons from their house, and in a second procession brings them to the Church of Saint Roch, for the actual thanksgiving Mass. A third procession after the Mass returns the images to the house of the host family, who then return each icon to the house of its respective caretaker.

The Pamisa is also held anytime a family want to borrow the icons.

== Shrine ==
Diocesan Shrine of St. Martha and Parish of St. Roch in Pateros, Metro Manila, Philippines. The only shrine in southeast Asia dedicated to St. Martha.

In 2008, Rev. Fr. Orly Cantillon, the parish priest of the Church of San Roque in Pateros, filed a petition to Francisco C. San Diego D.D., the Bishop of Pasig, requesting that the Parish be made a Diocesan Shrine. The request was granted and the decree presented December 2008. The proclamation was made official February 7, 2009, followed by the annual fiesta the next day.

While Saint Roch is the patron saint of Pateros, Saint Martha is the patron of duck-raisers. The town holds a grander celebration on Saint Martha’s feast, while the feast of Saint Roch on 16 August is often scaled down as occurs during the monsoon season. In the 1960s the town priests tried to correct this by moving the celebration from 16 August to the nearest Sunday of the same month. Until today, the feast of Saint Roch is simpler, devoid of merrymaking and feasting.

== Sources ==
- Diocesan Shrine of St. Martha, Parish of St. Roch Facebook page (Filipino)
- Poderes de Santa Marta de Pateros Facebook page (Filipino)
- Nocheseda, Elmer I. (March 2002). "Ecological and Ritual Change in the Devotion to Santa Marta of Pateros". Philippine Quarterly of Culture and Society. No. 1/2. University of San Carlos Publications. Volume 30: pages 65–110.
