= Daisy Reyes =

Filipino beauty queen, actress and politician

Member of the Pateros Municipal Council
- In office June 30, 2010 – June 30, 2016

Personal details
- Born: Daisy Garcia Reyes; ~1976 Manila, Philippines
- Party: Independent (2015–present)
- Other political affiliations: Nacionalista (2009–2015)
- Children: Gabrielle Lauren
- Occupation: Businesswoman, actress, model

Daisy Garcia Reyes is a Filipino actress, singer, TV host, politician, businesswoman and beauty pageant titleholder. She was crowned Binibining Pilipinas World 1996. She earned the title as the Beauty Queen Diva. She is a former councilor in Pateros, Philippines.

== Career ==
Reyes starred in films of various genre such as sexy films, drama films and comedy films. She starred in the critically acclaimed Carino Brutal with Rosanna Roces. She has also done films with some of the biggest names in Philippine movies such as Rudy Fernandez in Palaban and Birador, Aga Muhlach in Hinahanap-hanap Kita, Lito Lapid in Lisensyado and Albert Martinez in Peque Gallaga's Scorpio Nights 2.

She appeared in GMA-7's primetime series Legacy.

Reyes was also a recording artist, having released two albums. Reyes became one of the hosts of Doctors on TV, aired on UNTV.

== Beauty queen ==
At fifteen, Reyes won Mod Cerinas de Manila pageant. A year after, she tried her luck at Eat Bulaga!'s Beautiful Girl but failed to make it to the finals. While in college at Arellano University, she joined Miss Manila pageant placing Second Runner-up.

In 1995, Reyes joined Mutya ng Pilipinas and was awarded as Second Runner-up and Miss Friendship. She then assumed the Mutya ng Pilipinas Expo-International title which gives her to right compete in Ecuador for the Miss Expo-International pageant, where she placed Fourth Runner-up. In 1996, she won the Binibining Pilipinas World title and was also awarded as Best in Long Gown. Reyes was awarded Miss Personality out of 89 contestants in Miss World held in India.

== Personal life ==
She has a daughter named Gabrielle Lauren.

She oversees two businesses, Daisy Premium Papaya Soap and a beauty salon. She was also a councilor of Pateros from 2010 to 2016, and ran for mayor of Pateros in 2016 but lost to Miguel "Ike" Ponce III. She is also a member of Team Ministries International.

In 2025, then-congressman Albee Benitez was accused by his wife Nikki Lopez of having an illegitimate child with Reyes.

== Filmography ==
=== Television ===
- Rio del Mar (1999–2001)
- Isang Dalaga sa Panahon ng Trahedya (television film, 1999) – Kuyapi
- Munting Anghel (TV series) (2000)
- Kung Mawawala Ka (TV series) (2001)
- Debate with Mare at Pare - Beauty or Brains? (2005)
- Mutya (2011)
  - A Boy's Bestfriend (2011)
  - Sinong-A-Ling-Dingdong (2011)
  - Laro Laro (2012)
- Wansapanataym
- Alice Bungisngis and her Wonder Walis (2012)
- Legacy (2012)
  - Titulo (2010)
  - Parol (2010)
  - Tulay II (2011)
  - Shorts (2012)
  - Krus II (2013)
- Maalaala Mo Kaya
- Oh My G! (2015)
- FPJ's Ang Probinsyano (2015)

=== Film ===
Year	Title	Role	Notes
1996	Gayuma		
1996	Mga Liham ni Alberto		
1997	Huwag Na Huwag Kang Lalapit, Darling	Darling	
1998	Lisensiyado	Sandra	
1998	Walang Katapusang Init		
1998	Takaw Tukso		
1998	Dr. X on the Air		
1998	Birador		
1998	Carino Brutal		
1998	Hatiin Natin ang Ligaya	Gracia	
1998	Sa Piling ng Iba	Bessie	
1999	Peque Gallaga's Scorpio Nights 2	Dana	
1999	Hinahanap-Hanap Kita	Trisha	
1999	Dumating Ka Lang Ba para Umalis	Anna	
1999	'Di Puwedeng Hindi Puwede!	Marie	
1999	Ms. Kristina Moran: Babaeng Palaban		
1999	Kapag Kumulo ang Dugo	Benny	
1999	Linlang		
1999	Ako ang Lalagot sa Hininga Mo	Alda	
2000	SPO4 Antonio Cuervo: Police		
2000	Palaban	Jenny Morales	
2000	Waray		
2000	Testigo	Atty. Myla Morales	
2000	Markova: Comfort Gay	Eva Reyes/Rosing	
2000	Ping Lacson: Super Cop	Trigger woman	
2001	Lakas at Pag-ibig		
2001	Parehas ang Laban	David Valdez's wife	
2001	Marital Rape		

=== Commercials ===
- Panasonic 2121
- Beer Na Beer
- Hawk Shoes
- Laguna Bel-Air
- Toyota FX "Darna"
- Goldilocks

== Discography ==
She has been singing rock songs since twelve. In her first contest, she sang "Luha" by Sakada. At thirteen, she was part of DZRH's Fiesta Caravan performing team of the late Ric Radam.

In 2002, she was offered a recording deal by Dyna Records giving her self-titled album, Tayo'y Magsayawan. She also formed a band called DAZE. Together with her band, Reyes has performed in various bars such as Bagaberde, Atchie's, Friends, Aruba and Metro Phi.

Her second album, Ode to the Irony of Love, was released in 2005. Its genre is pop-rock-alternative and is composed of five original compositions, three revivals and two acoustic versions.

== See also ==
- Binibining Pilipinas
- Mutya ng Pilipinas
- Miss World Philippines
- Philippines at major beauty pageants
