= Pateros =

- Municipality
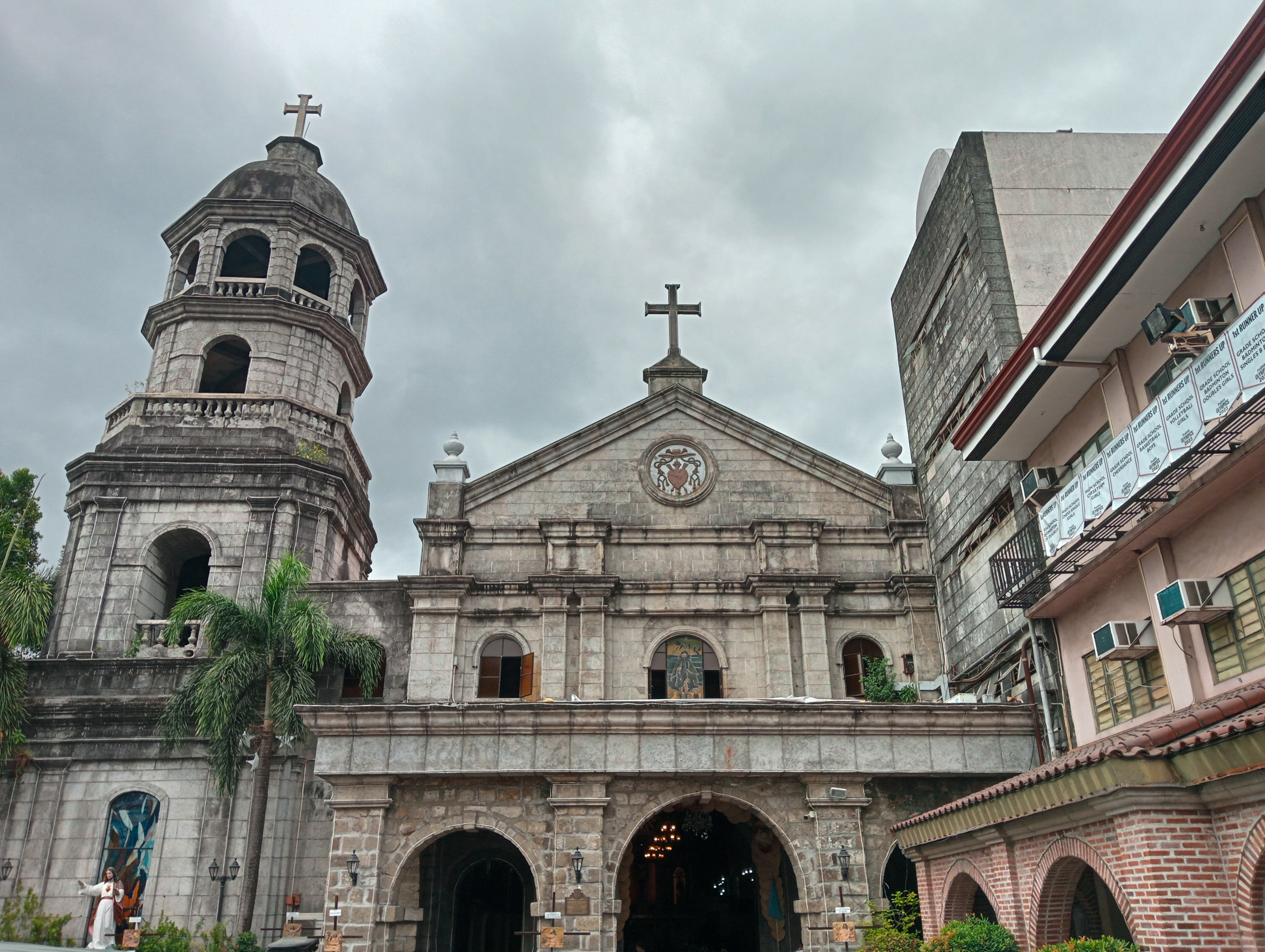
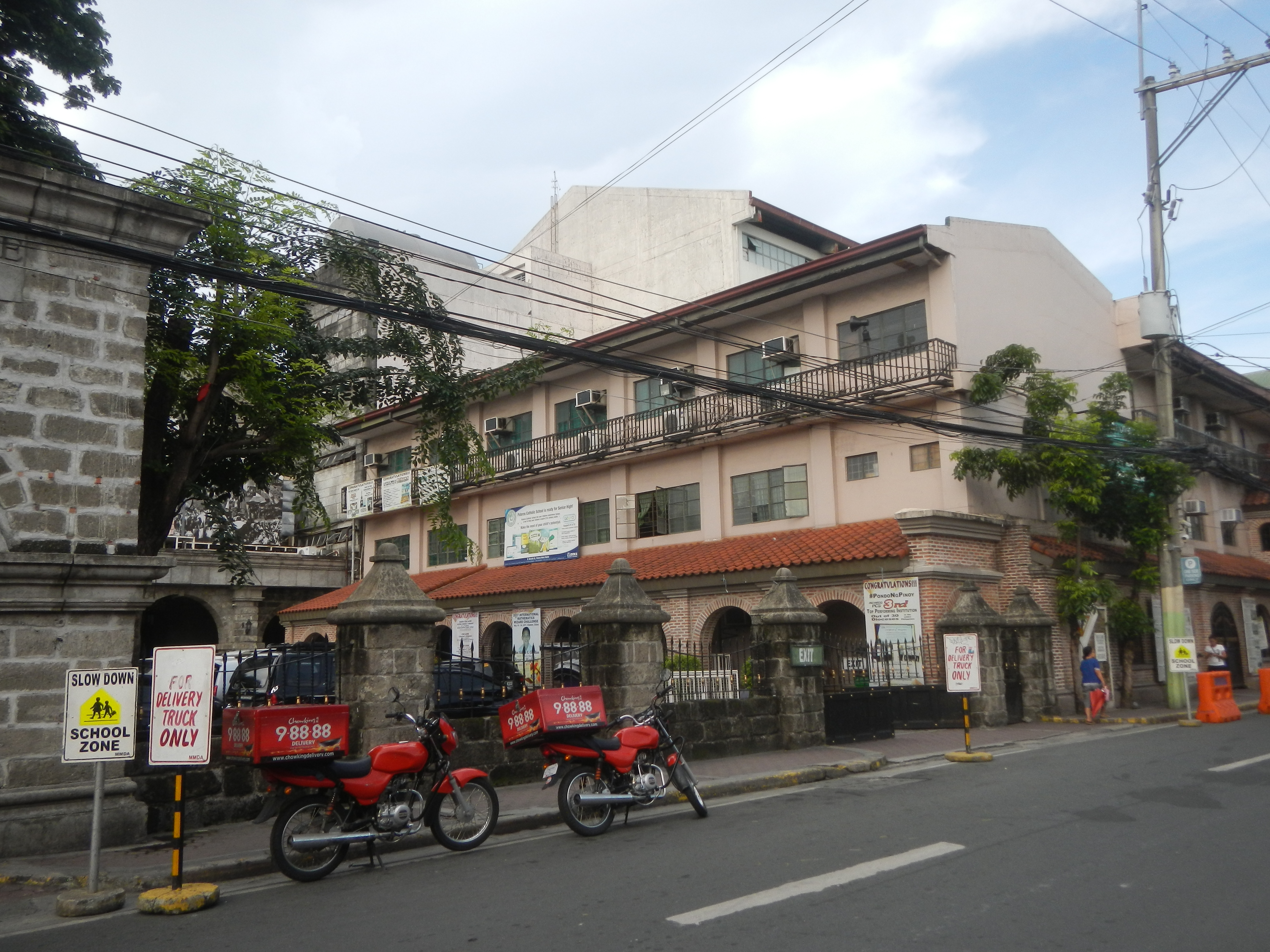
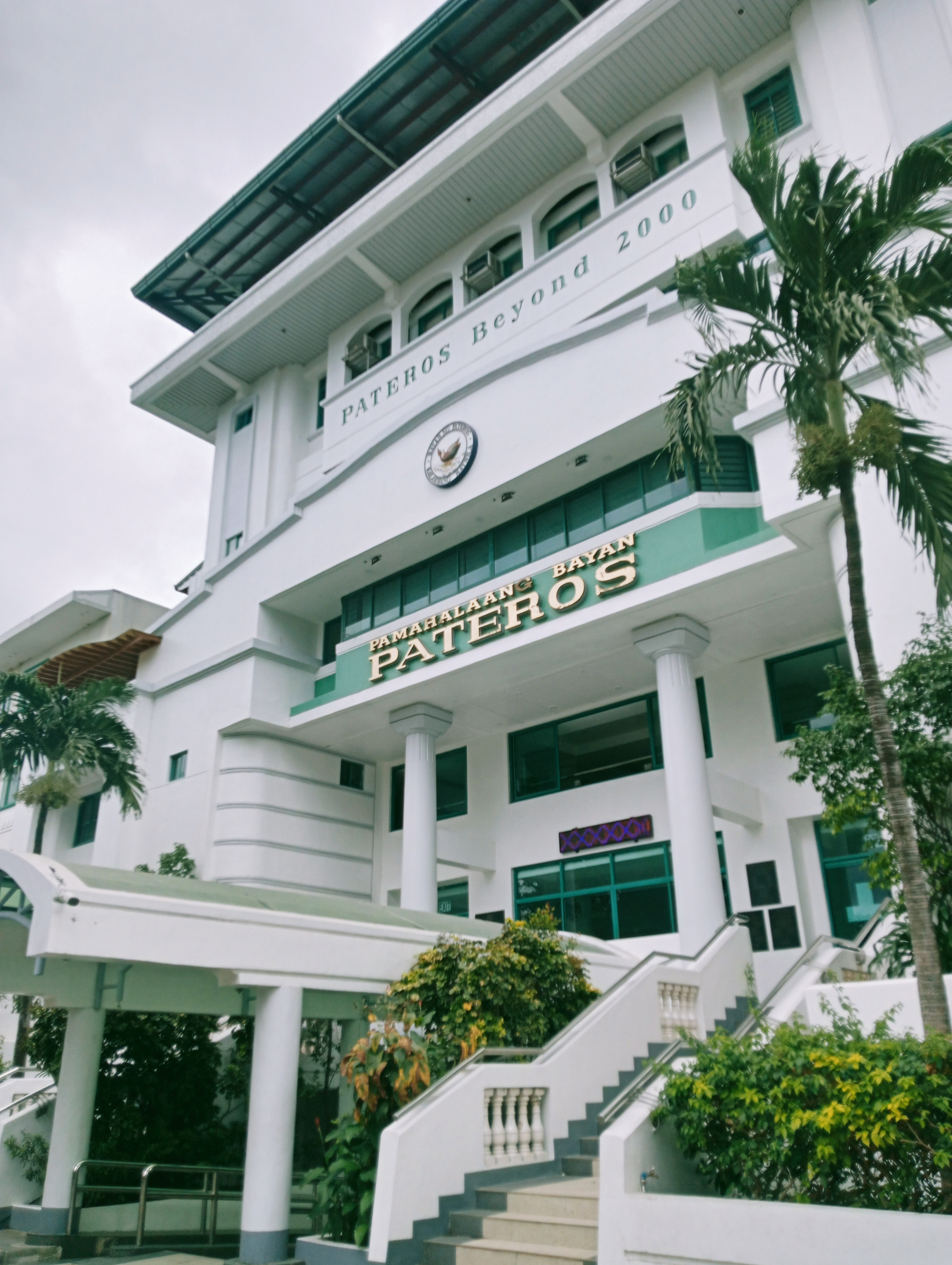
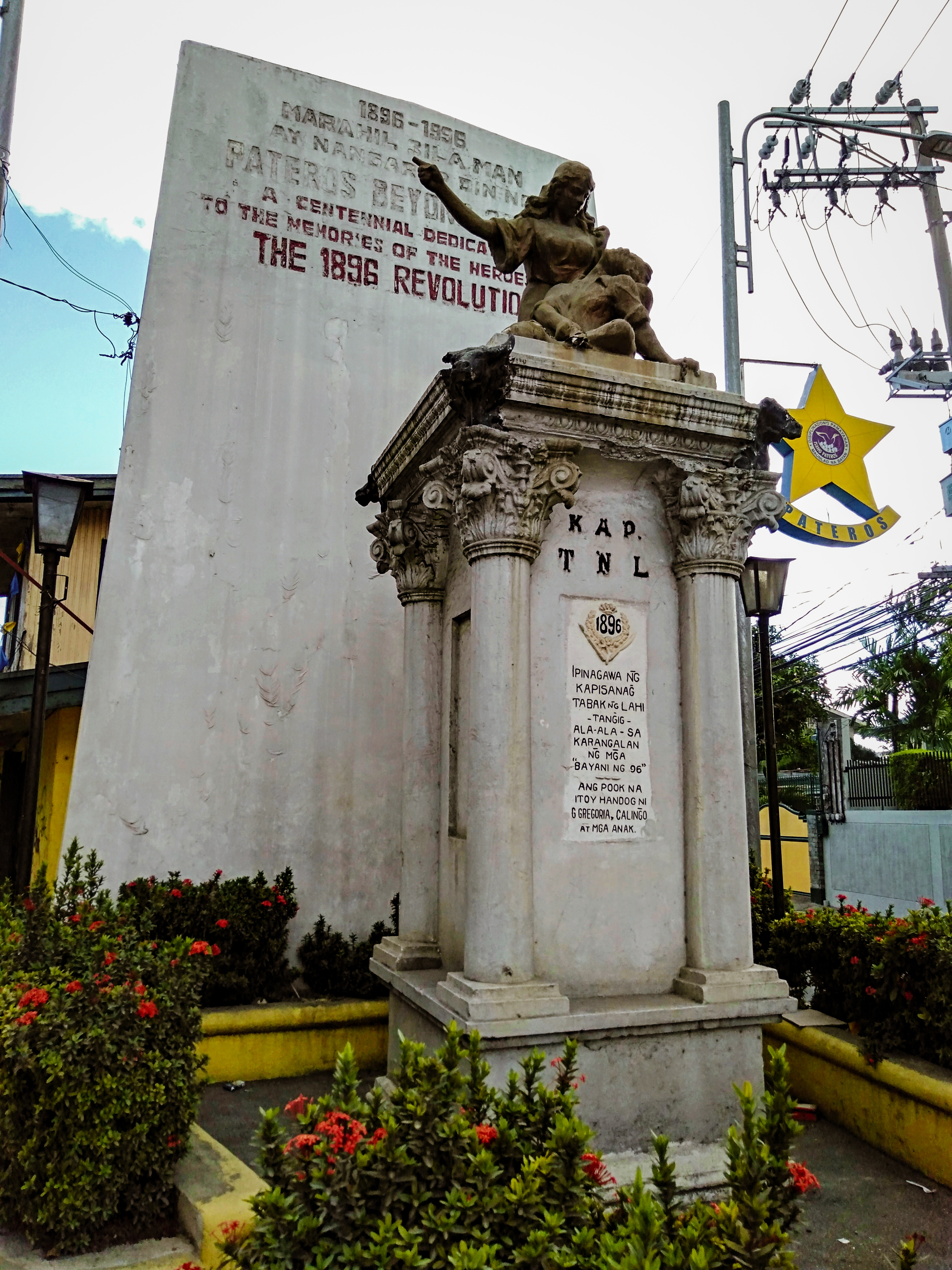
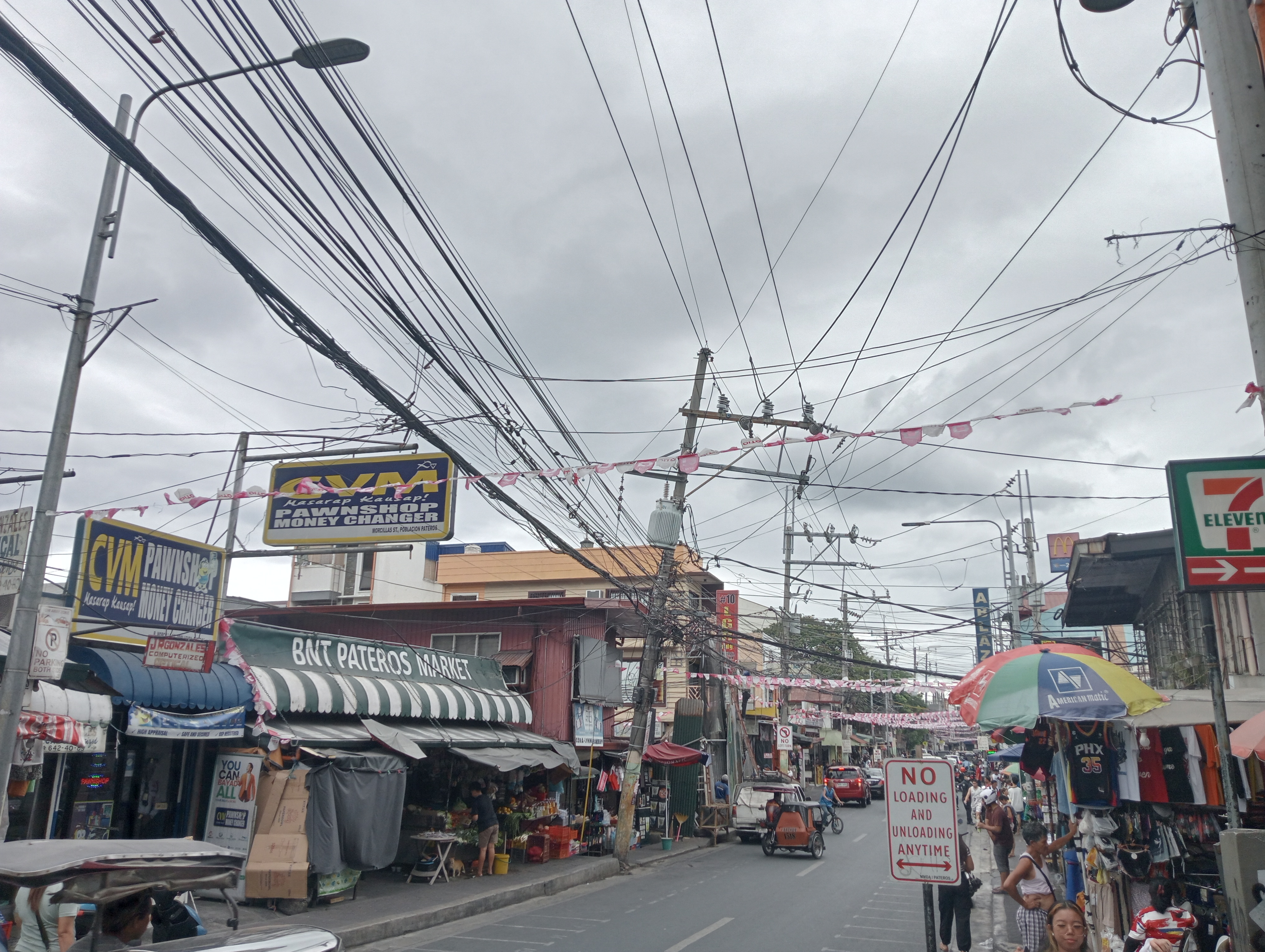
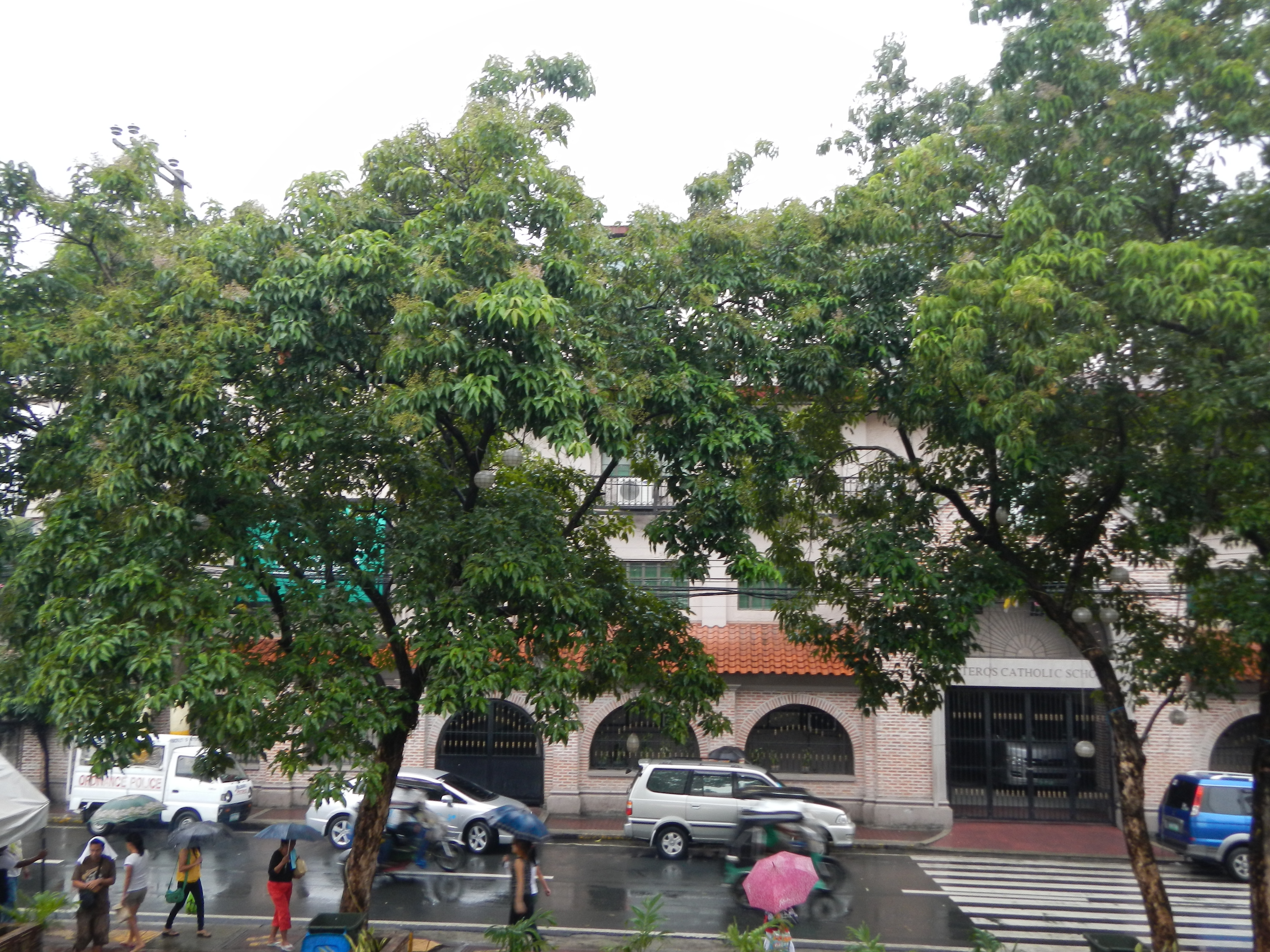
- From top, left to right : San Roque Parish Church • Pateros Catholic School • Pateros Municipal Hall • Dulong Bayan Monument • Pateros Downtown area • Town Plaza

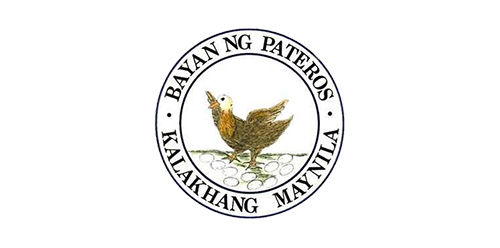
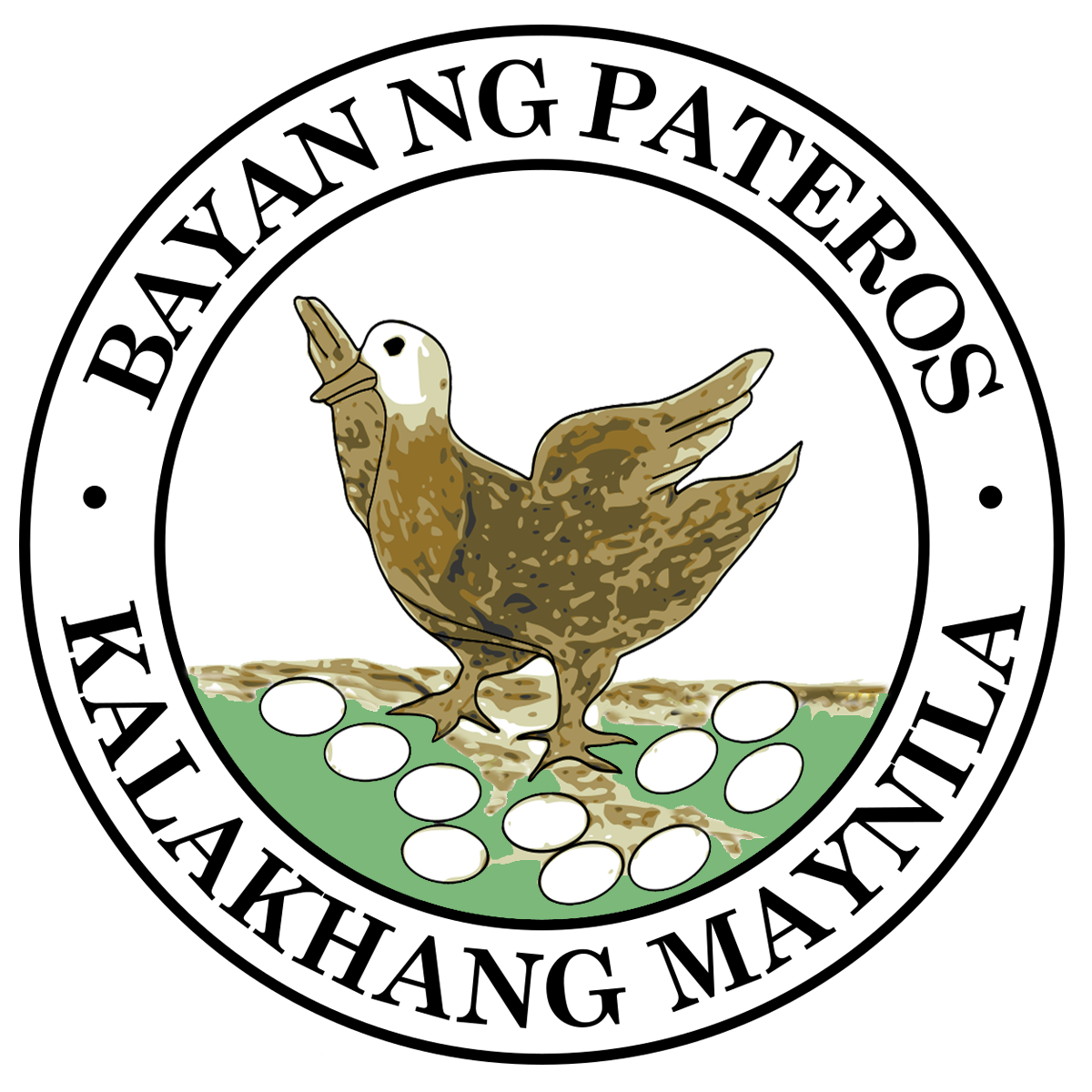
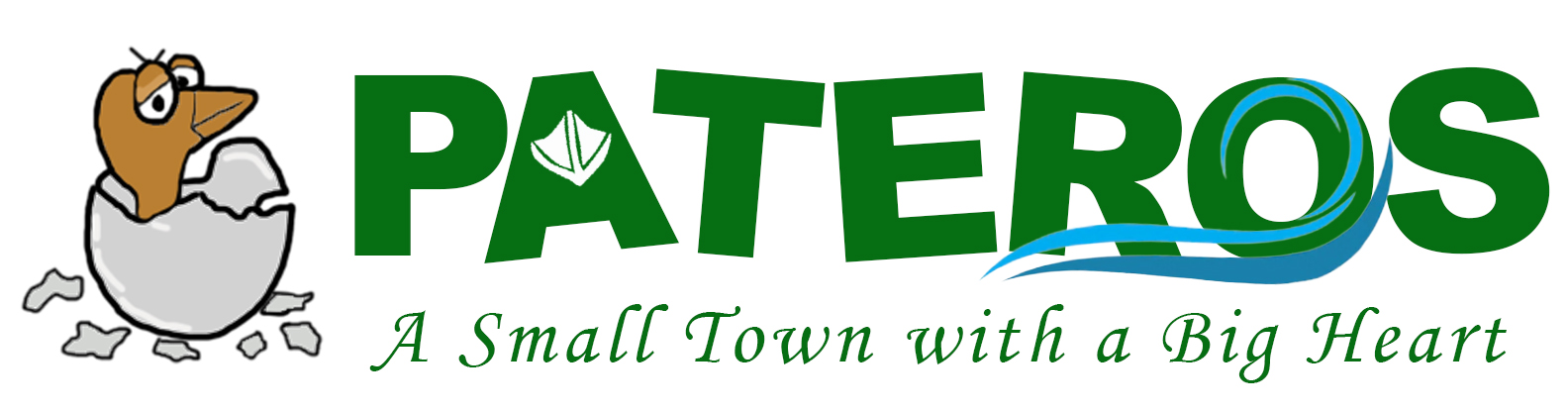
- Flag Seal Wordmark
- Nicknames: Balut Capital of the Philippines; Small Town with a Big Heart
- Motto: Gobyernong Maayos, Gobyernong Bilis Kilos; Good Government, Fast Government
- Anthem: Himno ng Pateros; Pateros Hymn
- Map of Metro Manila with Pateros highlighted

- Location within the Philippines
- Coordinates: 14°32′41″N 121°04′02″E
- Country: Philippines
- Region: Metro Manila
- District: Lone district, shared with Taguig
- Founded: 1799
- Reorganization: March 29, 1900
- Chartered: January 1, 1909
- Named for: "Criadores de Patos" (Duck Raisers)
- Barangays: 10 (see Barangays)

Government
  - Type: Sangguniang Bayan
  - Mayor: Gerald German (PFP)
  - Vice Mayor: Carlo U. Santos (Nacionalista)
  - Representative: Ricardo "Ading" S. Cruz Jr. (Nacionalista)
  - Council: Members: First District; • Allan Dela Cruz; • Nestito Ponce Jr.; • Jay Mabanglo; • Edwin Acosta Jr.; • Mil Villegas; • Ryan Rey Panis; Second District; • Arthur Cortez; • Omar Alcantara; • Alden Mangoba; • Emmanuel Tañga; • Jojo Sanchez; • Paul Argie Cruz
  - Electorate: 37,830 voters (2025)

Area
  - Total: 1.66 km^{2} (0.64 sq mi)
- Elevation: 14 m (46 ft)
- Highest elevation: 136 m (446 ft)
- Lowest elevation: 0 m (0 ft)

Population (2024 census)
  - Total: 67,319
  - Density: 40,600/km^{2} (105,000/sq mi)
  - Households: 15,838

Economy
  - Income class: 1st municipal income class
  - Poverty incidence: 1.4% (2023)
  - Revenue: ₱ 513.7 million (2024)
  - Assets: ₱ 770.3 million (2024)
  - Expenditure: ₱ 392.4 million (2024)
  - Liabilities: ₱ 149 million (2024)

Service provider
  - Electricity: Manila Electric Company (Meralco)
- Time zone: UTC+8 (PHT)
- PSGC: 1381701000
- IDD : area code: +63 (0)02
- Native language: Filipino
- Catholic diocese: Roman Catholic Diocese of Pasig
- Website: pateros.gov.ph

Pateros (Tagalog: [pɐˈtɛɾos]), officially the Municipality of Pateros (Filipino: Bayan ng Pateros), is the sole municipality of Metro Manila, Philippines. According to the 2024 census, it has a population of 67,319 people.

This municipality is famous for its duck-raising industry and especially for producing balut, a Filipino delicacy, which is a boiled, fertilized duck egg. Pateros is also known for the production of red salty eggs and "inutak", a local rice cake. Moreover, the town is known for manufacturing of "alfombra", a locally made footwear with a carpet-like fabric on its top surface. Pateros is bordered by the highly urbanized cities of Pasig to the north, and by Taguig to the east, west and south.

Pateros is the smallest municipality in the Philippines by land area, and is the smallest administrative division in Metro Manila by population, but it is the third most densely populated within Metro Manila at around 37,000 inhabitants per square kilometer or 96,000 inhabitants per square mile. Unlike its neighbors in Metro Manila, Pateros is the only municipality in the region.

== Etymology ==
The name Pateros is most likely derived from the duck-raising industry. The Tagalog word (of Spanish origin) for "duck" is pato and pateros, "duck-raisers". The early 19th-century US diplomat Edmund Roberts used Duck-town, another name for Pateros, stating that he "never before saw so many ducks together" in one place. The duck reference is perfectly suited for Pateros, whose popular culinary specialty is a street food called balut, a fertilized developing duck embryo that is boiled and eaten from the shell. Several balutans offer different and unique cuisine as well as street merchants selling them on the side of the road.

== History ==
=== Spanish colonial era ===
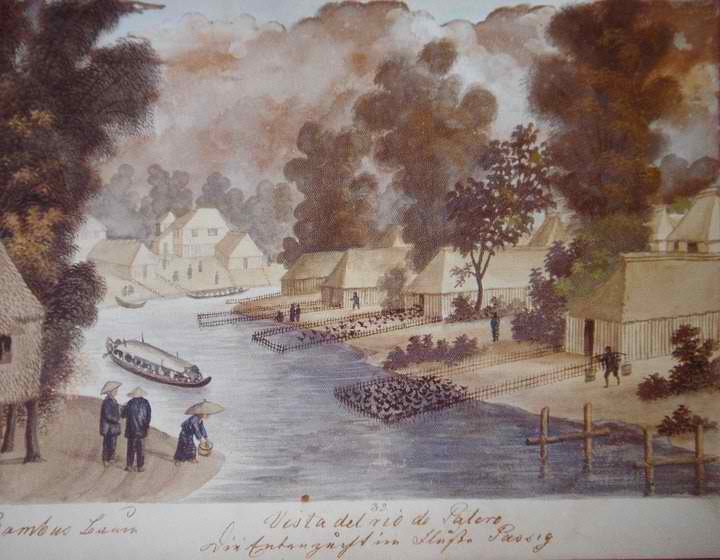
1821 Idyllic Painting of Pateros by José Honorato Lozano, showing the duck farms on the river banks that are the namesake of the municipality

Before 1799, Pateros was a barrio of Pasig called "Aguho" (agoho, the Casuarina equisetifolia tree), or "embarcadero" (“small port”). The port made the area a focal point of trade and commerce for Pasig and nearby towns, making it a more progressive barrio. The Spanish Governor-General of the Philippines later issued a decree creating Pateros as an independent municipality, initially with five barrios (villages): Aguho, San Roque, Santa Ana, Santo Rosario (since partitioned into Santo Rosario-Silangan and Santo Rosario-Kanluran), and Mamangcat (now in Fort Bonifacio).

==== The Philippine Revolution ====
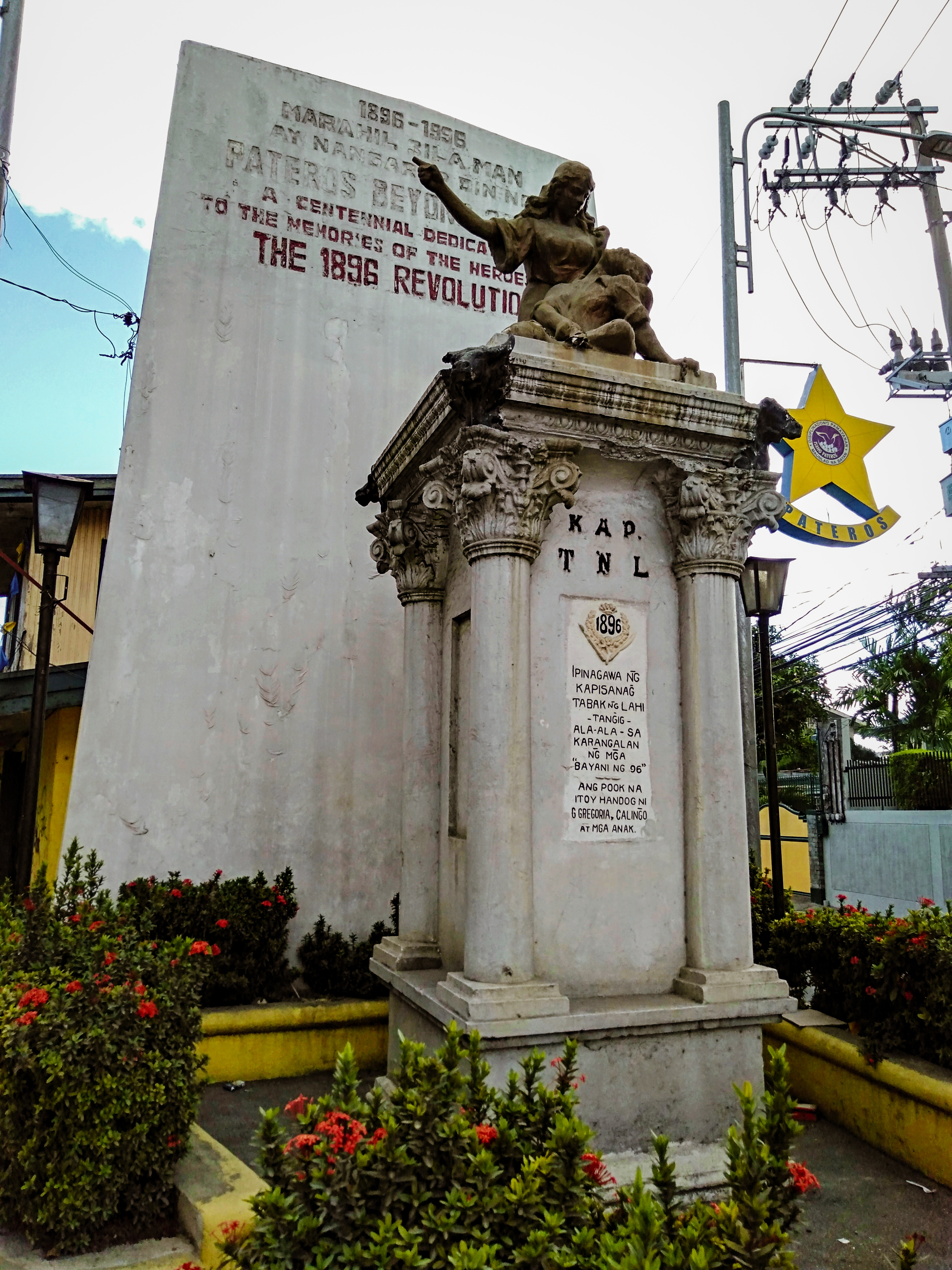
1896 Revolution Memorial Monument, also known as the Dulumbayan Memorial Monument

During the Philippine–American War in March 1899, the first contingent of American Volunteers from Washington arrived in the town of Pateros. The American soldiers rallied and eventually won the battles to take control and establish a temporary camp in town.

=== American colonial era ===
Throughout the American colonisation of the Philippines, American soldiers were able to experience the culture and livelihood of the citizens of Pateros, such as eating roast duck meals during wartime and sending postcards of Pateros back to the United States. In 1900, Lieutenant Charles Nosler renamed the city of Ive's Landing in Washington State after the town of Pateros in the Philippines. The American Pateros in Washington officially became a city on May 1, 1913.

==== Province of Rizal and restructurings ====
On March 29, 1900, Pateros, then a part of the Province of Manila, was among the towns absorbed by the newly created province of Rizal, by virtue of General Order No. 40, Act No. 137 of the Philippine Commission, promulgated on June 11, 1901. On October 12, 1903, Act No. 942 united Pateros with Taguig and Muntinlupa into one municipality under Pateros. On November 25, 1903, Muntinlupa was later ceded from Pateros to Biñan, La Laguna through Act No. 1008. The remaining municipality was renamed Taguig, and it reabsorbed Muntinlupa on March 22, 1905, through Act No. 1308.

Executive Order No. 20 dated February 29, 1908, partitioned Pateros from Taguig, and the town regained its status as an independent municipality on January 1, 1909, by Executive Order No. 36.

=== Philippine independence ===
==== Incorporation in Metropolitan Manila ====
On November 7, 1975, Pateros became a part of the new Metropolitan Manila Area through Presidential Decree No. 824.

==== International partnership ====
On July 23, 2013, Mayor Jaime C. Medina visited the city of Pateros, Washington State, United States to sign the Sister City Memorandum of Understanding between the Municipality of Pateros, Metro Manila and Pateros City of Okanogan County, Washington State, USA. According to Mayor Gail Howe, the two cities have not applied through Sister Cities International but the goals of promoting the culture and exchanges have turned the sisterhood into reality.

== Geography ==
=== Climate ===
Climate data for Pateros, Metro Manila
| Month | Jan | Feb | Mar | Apr | May | Jun | Jul | Aug | Sep | Oct | Nov | Dec | Year |
|---|---|---|---|---|---|---|---|---|---|---|---|---|---|
| Mean daily maximum °C (°F) | 29 (84) | 30 (86) | 32 (90) | 34 (93) | 33 (91) | 31 (88) | 30 (86) | 29 (84) | 29 (84) | 30 (86) | 30 (86) | 29 (84) | 31 (87) |
| Mean daily minimum °C (°F) | 20 (68) | 20 (68) | 21 (70) | 23 (73) | 24 (75) | 25 (77) | 24 (75) | 25 (77) | 24 (75) | 23 (73) | 22 (72) | 21 (70) | 23 (73) |
| Average precipitation mm (inches) | 7 (0.3) | 7 (0.3) | 9 (0.4) | 21 (0.8) | 101 (4.0) | 152 (6.0) | 188 (7.4) | 170 (6.7) | 159 (6.3) | 115 (4.5) | 47 (1.9) | 29 (1.1) | 1,005 (39.7) |
| Average rainy days | 3.3 | 3.5 | 11.1 | 8.1 | 18.9 | 23.5 | 26.4 | 25.5 | 24.5 | 19.6 | 10.4 | 6.4 | 181.2 |
Source: Meteoblue

=== Barangays ===
Pateros is politically subdivided into ten barangays:

| Barangays | Population (2024) | Area (km^{2}) | Density (/km^{2}) |
|---|---|---|---|
| Aguho | 7,488 | 0.21 | 35,657 |
| Magtanggol | 1,452 | 0.08 | 18,150 |
| Martirez del 96 | 5,130 | 0.19 | 27,000 |
| Poblacion | 2,089 | 0.0743 | 28,116 |
| San Pedro | 2,252 | 0.1 | 22,520 |
| San Roque | 4,897 | 0.2 | 24,485 |
| Santa Ana | 30,950 | 0.75 | 41,267 |
| Santo Rosario–Kanluran | 5,504 | 0.21 | 26,210 |
| Santo Rosario–Silangan | 4,744 | 0.2 | 23,720 |
| Tabacalera | 2,853 | 0.1 | 28,530 |
Source: Facts & Figures | Pateros Official

=== Boundary dispute ===
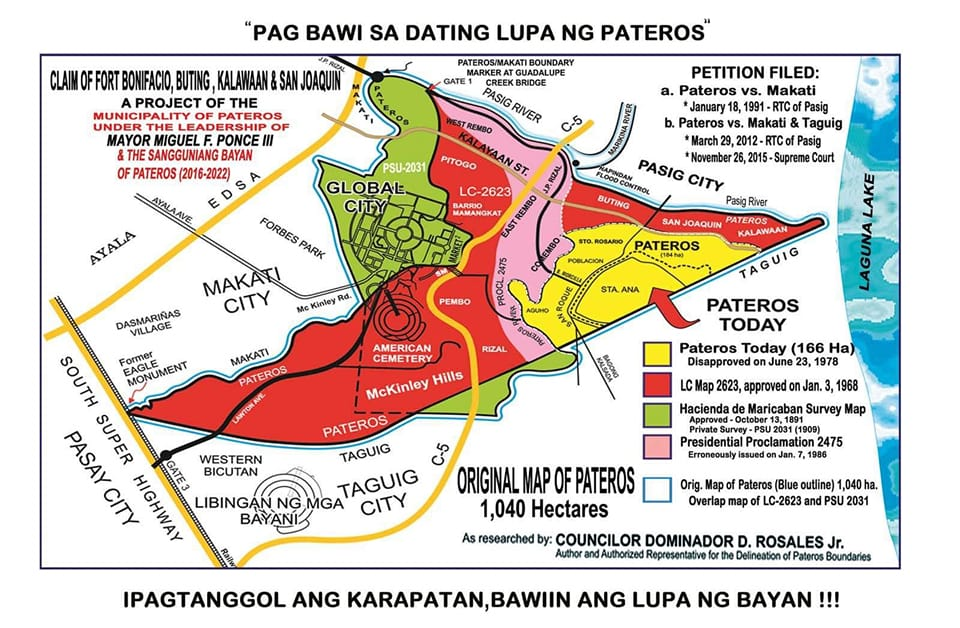
Delineation map showing territories claimed by Pateros.

The municipal government of Pateros claims that its original land area was not its present land area of 2.10 km^{2} (0.81 sq mi) but 1,040 hectares (10.4 km^{2}) including Fort Bonifacio, particularly the Embo barangays Comembo, Pembo, East Rembo, West Rembo, Cembo, South Cembo, Pitogo, Rizal, Post Proper Northside and Post Proper Southside which are now part of the city of Taguig (originally Mamancat, Masilang, San Nicolas, and Malapadnabato, former parts of Pateros), based on documents and official maps obtained by former Pateros Councilor Dominador Rosales from 30 libraries and offices including USA Library of Congress and USA Archives. One of those maps was the 1968 Land Classification Map of the Bureau of Land. Also included in their claim are the present-day barangays Buting, San Joaquin, and Kalawaan in Pasig.

Pateros' decrease in territory was accounted to a cadastral mapping in Metro Manila conducted in 1978. Pateros Mayor Nestor Ponce challenged the map through an objection letter dated June 23, 1978. But in January 1986, then President Ferdinand Marcos issued Proclamation No. 2475 which stated that Fort Bonifacio is situated in Makati and it is open for disposition. Because of that, a boundary dispute arose which moved Pateros to request a dialogue about that with then Municipal Council of Makati in 1990. Pateros also filed a complaint against Makati at the Makati Regional Trial Court in 1996 but the trial court dismissed the case for lack of jurisdiction. The case was brought to the Court of Appeals in 2003 but the case was also denied. The same case was also elevated to the Supreme Court in 2009 but it was denied again.

==== Supreme Court decision ====
Almost two decades later, the Supreme Court on June 16, 2009, per Antonio Eduardo B. Nachura denied Pateros' petition against Makati but ruled out that the boundary dispute should be settled amicably by their respective legislative bodies based on Section 118(d) of the Local Government Code. Pursuant to the decision, Pateros invited Makati to a council-to-council dialogue. This happened on October 8, 2009. Four meetings were held and at the fourth dialogue on November 23, 2009, a joint resolution was made stating that Makati is requesting a tripartite conference between Pateros, Taguig and Makati.

Despite the resolution of the dispute between Taguig and Makati in favor of the former by the Supreme Court in 2023, the high court has allowed Pateros to pursue its claims.

== Demographics ==
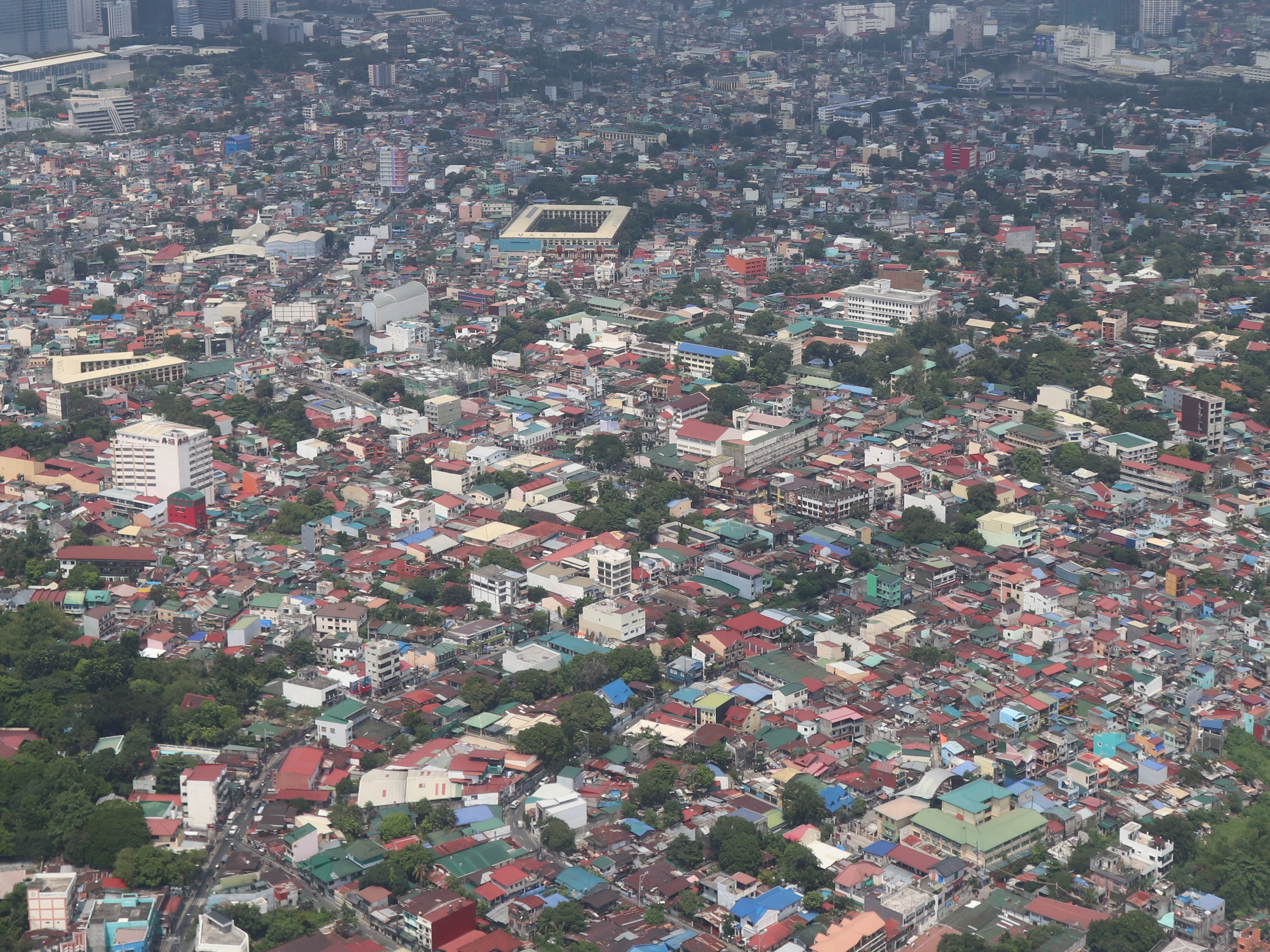
Aerial view of Pateros

Population census of Pateros

| Year | Pop. | ±% p.a. |
|---|---|---|
| 1903 | 4,105 | — |
| 1918 | 4,113 | +0.01% |
| 1939 | 7,160 | +2.67% |
| 1948 | 8,380 | +1.76% |
| 1960 | 13,173 | +3.84% |
| 1970 | 25,468 | +6.81% |

| Year | Pop. | ±% p.a. |
|---|---|---|
| 1975 | 32,821 | +5.22% |
| 1980 | 40,288 | +4.18% |
| 1990 | 51,409 | +2.47% |
| 1995 | 55,286 | +1.37% |
| 2000 | 57,407 | +0.81% |
| 2007 | 61,940 | +1.05% |

| Year | Pop. | ±% p.a. |
|---|---|---|
| 2010 | 64,147 | +1.28% |
| 2015 | 63,840 | −0.09% |
| 2020 | 65,227 | +0.45% |
| 2024 | 67,319 | +0.76% |

Source: Philippine Statistics Authority

As of 1818, the population was estimated at 3,840 Tagalog people. When Edmund Roberts visited in 1834, he estimated approximately 4,500 residents.

According to the town's 2005 land use classification report, 91.62% of Pateros's 1.7-square-kilometer (0.66 sq mi) land is classified as residential.

=== Language ===
Filipino and English are the Philippine official languages. Filipino, a standardized version of Tagalog, is spoken primarily in Pateros.

== Economy ==
Poverty incidence of Pateros (%)

Source: Philippine Statistics Authority

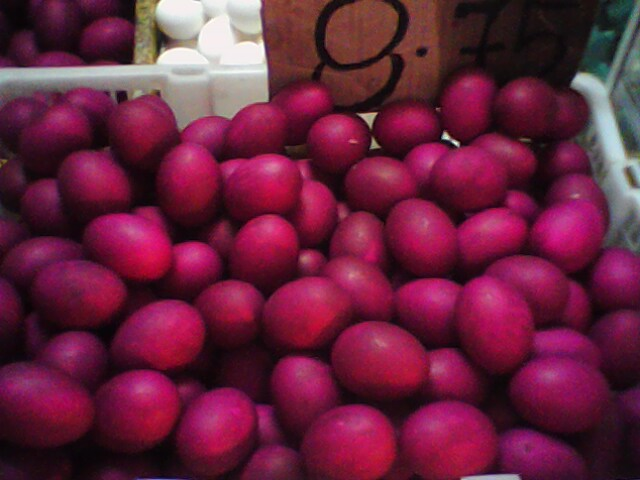
Red salty duck eggs, a popular product of Pateros

The town of Pateros is known for balut and had a duck-raising industry. As early as 1834, Pateros has been raising and selling duck and maintaining a fishing industry. Due to the water pollution on the Pateros River which connects to the Pasig River, the duck-raising industry declined around the 1970s or 1980s.

Vendors continue to sell balut in Pateros, taking advantage of the association of the food item to the town with duck eggs supplied from neighboring provinces in the Calabarzon region. While the duck-raising industry in the town is now minimal, the local government is encouraging the growth of the balut industry. It gives tax exemptions to balut vendors in the town. As of 2017, the local government is encouraging the growth of other industries in Pateros such as business process outsourcing although the town's size, 1.76 square kilometers (0.68 sq mi), remains a hindrance.

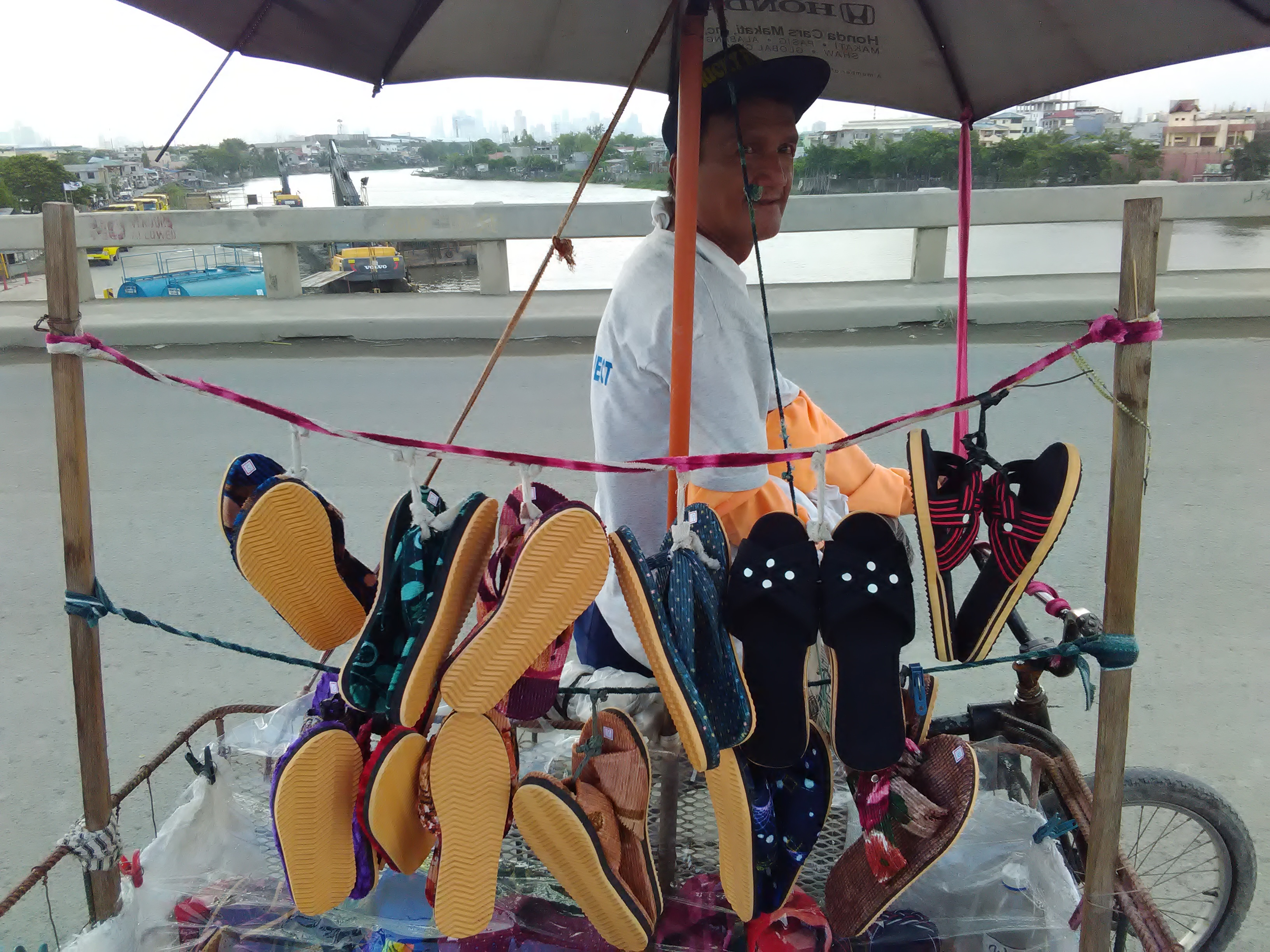
Alfombra Slippers

Another product of Pateros is the "alfombra slippers", a footwear with carpet-like fabric, which is produced using abaca fiber.

According to the town's 2005 classification report, 3.13% of its land area is classified as commercial, 0.39% industrial, and 0.88% agricultural.

== Government ==
=== Local government ===
Following the 2025 local elections, Gerald German (Partido Federal ng Pilipinas) has been elected and proclaimed as the new Mayor of Pateros, alongside Carlo Santos (Nacionalista Party) who secured his reelection as Vice Mayor. The municipality's local government is supported by a set of eight councilors elected at large, with winners including Allan dela Cruz, Don Ponce, Jay Mabanglo, and Edwin Acosta. The legislative representation for the Pateros-Taguig Lone District is held by Ricardo "Ading" Cruz Jr.

=== Official seal ===
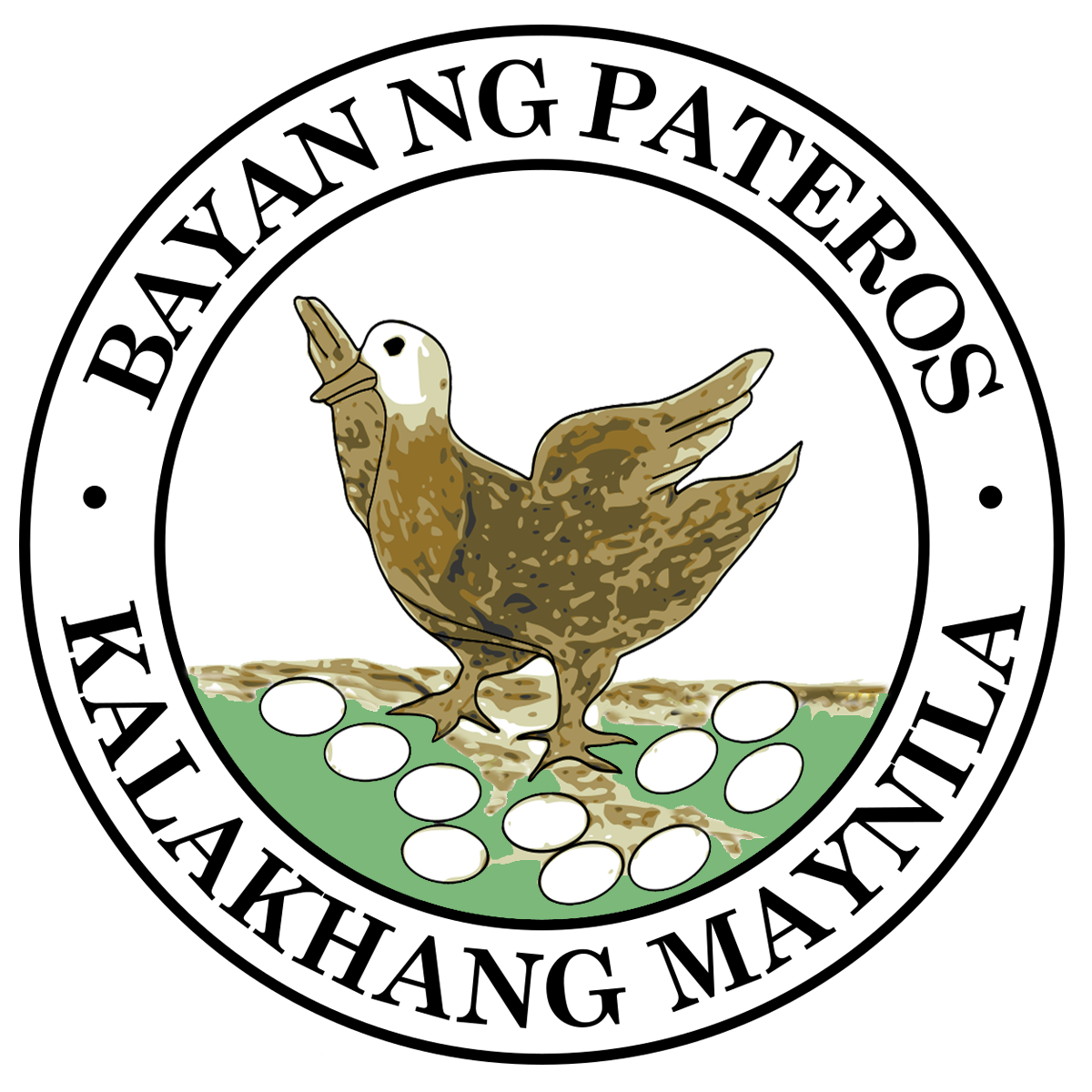
Pateros Municipal Seal

The official municipal seal of Pateros features the Pateros (Mallard) duck and ten duck eggs. The duck symbolizes the duck-raising industry where town was known, while the eggs represent the barangays of Pateros and signifies the town's balut industry.

== Education ==
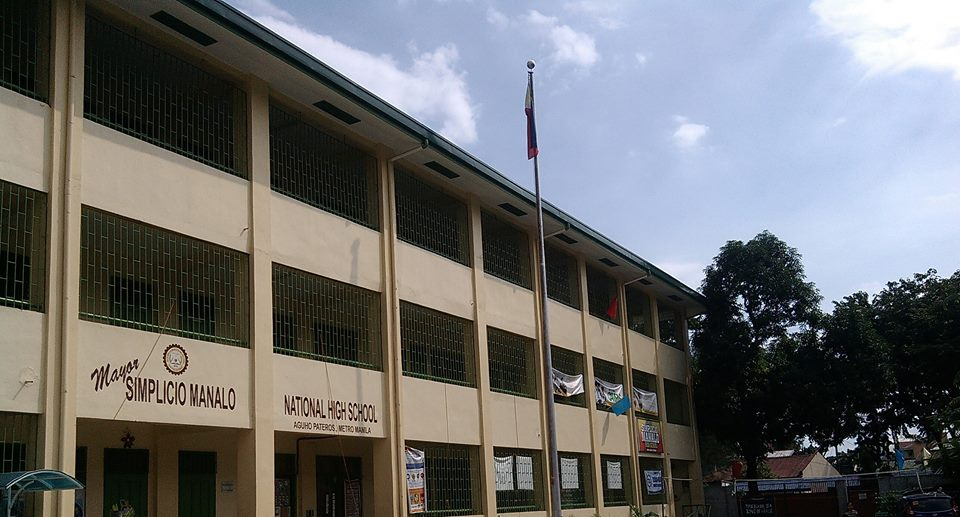
Mayor Simplico Manalo National High School

The following are the different elementary and high schools under Pateros School District of the Department of Education – Schools Division of Taguig City and Pateros, and one community college recognized by Commission on Higher Education.

=== Primary public schools ===
- Aguho Elementary School
- Captain Hipolito Francisco Elementary School
- Captain Hipolito Francisco Elementary School-Annex
- Paulina Manalo Elementary School
- Pateros Elementary School
- Sta. Ana Elementary School
- Sto. Rosario Elementary School

=== Secondary public schools ===
- Mayor Simplicio Manalo National High School
- Maria Concepcion Cruz High School
- Pateros National High School

=== Tertiary ===
- Pateros Technological College

=== Private schools ===
- APEC Schools – Pateros (Santo Rosario-Silangan)
- Huckleberry Montessori School
- Maranatha Christian Academy
- Pateros Catholic School
- Saint Genevieve School of Pateros
- SEP Christian School Inc.

== Culture ==
The annual Pandangguhan Festival honors the town's patron, Santa Marta. Typically observed on the second Sunday of February, it is renowned for its "pasubo" where food like balut, suman, and fruits are thrown into floats.

== Notable personalities ==
- Cesar Homero Rosales Concio Sr. (1907–2003) – architect who, as the first University Architect of the University of the Philippines, designed many buildings in the University of the Philippines Diliman campus.
- Berting Labra (1933–2009) – actor, sidekick of FPJ.
- Pete Lacaba (b. 1945) – poet, writer and journalist.
- Emmanuel Lacaba (1948–1976) – poet, writer and activist.
- Pelagia Mendoza y Gotianquin (1867–1939) – first female sculptor in the Philippines and was the first female student at the Escuela de Dibujo y Pintura (Drawing and Painting School).
- Daisy Reyes (b. c. 1976) – beauty queen, actress.
- Jimmy Santos (b. 1951) – Filipino actor, basketball player, and TV host.
- Socrates Villegas (b. 1960) – Bishop of Balanga (2004–2009), Archbishop of Lingayen-Dagupan (2009–present), former CBCP President.

== Sister cities ==
=== Local ===
- Taguig, Metro Manila
- Pasig, Metro Manila

=== International ===
- (United States) Pateros, Washington, US

== See also ==
- Pateros Church
- Santa Marta de Pateros
- 2016 Pateros local elections
