= List of Philippine presidential campaign slogans =

Campaign slogans have been a part of most Philippine presidential elections. Such slogans are either formulated by the candidates themselves or popularized by their own supporters which the candidate may later formally adopt.

== List ==
Election	Candidate	Slogan	English translation	Details	Reference
1953	Ramon Magsaysay	Magsaysay is our guy		Popularized via the campaign jingle "Mambo Magsaysay"	
1957	Carlos P. Garcia	Filipino first!			
1957	Manuel Manahan	Manahan is my man			
1961	Carlos P. Garcia	Filipino first!			
1961	Diosdado Macapagal	Poor boy from Lubao			
1965	Diosdado Macapagal	Poor boy from Lubao			
1965	Ferdinand Marcos	This nation can be great again			
1986	Corazon Aquino	Tama na! Sobra na! Palitan na!	lit. Enough! It's too much already! Time for change!	The campaign slogan is a reference to Aquino's call for an end to her rival Ferdinand Marcos' administration. Aquino and her supporters accused Marcos of human rights violations, especially during the martial law period, and branded him as a dictator.	
1986	Ferdinand Marcos	Marcos pa rin!	(We're) still for Marcos!	The slogan was used by Marcos' supporters who expressed their desire for the then-incumbent president to remain in power.	
1992	Fidel Ramos	Ed sa 92	Ed for 92		
1992	Miriam Defensor Santiago	Kay Miriam kami	We're for Miriam		
1992	Imelda Marcos	Marcos parin!	(We're) still for Marcos!		
1998	Joseph Estrada	Erap Para sa Mahirap	lit. Erap for the Poor	Estrada campaigned himself as a candidate for poor who seeks to address poverty in the country. His campaign appealed to populism which aimed to secure votes from the masa or masses. The campaign was also in sync with his image as an idol of the masses. "Erap" was his nickname and was also an actor.	
1998	Jose de Venecia	Victory, Joe!			
2004	Gloria Macapagal Arroyo	Go, Go, Gloria!		Main article: Gloria Macapagal Arroyo 2004 presidential campaign	
2004	Fernando Poe Jr.	Bagong Umaga	New Morning	Main article: Fernando Poe Jr. 2004 presidential campaign	
2004	Ping Lacson	Si Ping ang Pangulo	Ping is the President	Main article: Ping Lacson 2004 presidential campaign	
2004	Raul Roco	Bagong Pilipinas	New Philippines	Main article: Raul Roco 2004 presidential campaign	
2004	Eddie Villanueva	Bangon Pilipinas, Bangon!	Rise Philippines, Rise!		
2010	Benigno Aquino III	Kung Walang Corrupt, Walang Mahirap	lit. If no one is corrupt, no one will be poor	Main article: Benigno Aquino III 2010 presidential campaign Aquino's campaign slogan to emphasize his platform against corruption. His campaign is a response to the previous administration of President Gloria Macapagal Arroyo which faced many political scandals some of which implicated the President herself. The slogan proposes that with the eradication of corruption, poverty is likewise addressed.	
2010	Joseph Estrada	Pag May Erap, May Ginhawa	lit. If There's Erap, There's a comfortable life	Main article: Joseph Estrada 2010 presidential campaign	
2010	Manny Villar	Sipag at Tiyaga	lit. Diligence and Perseverance	Main article: Manny Villar 2010 presidential campaign Villar's campaign highlighted his roots in an effort to relate to the masses. A billionaire, Villar emphasized on his campaign that he grew up poor, as exemplified in his campaign jingle "Naging Mahirap", and that the diligence and perseverance led him to his current standing and that he is willing to use the same traits to address the issue of poverty. His campaign slogan as reflected with his other campaign materials such as his campaign jingle asserts that he will "end poverty".	
2010	Gilbert Teodoro	Galing at Talino	lit. Excellence and Intelligence	Main article: Gilbert Teodoro 2010 presidential campaign	
2016	Jejomar Binay	Competence and Experience, Only Binay		Main article: Jejomar Binay 2016 presidential campaign Binay stated that his campaign would focus on "Competence" and "Experience". He says that his critics should not make an issue of his platform and that his campaign slogan is referring to himself; presenting himself as someone who possesses these traits.	
2016	Miriam Defensor Santiago	Si Miriam Ang Sagot	lit. Miriam is the Answer	Main article: Miriam Defensor Santiago 2016 presidential campaign	
2016	Rodrigo Duterte	Tapang at Malasakit	lit. Fearlessness and Compassion	Main article: Rodrigo Duterte 2016 presidential campaign Even before Duterte formally launched his presidential bid, his supporters have been using the slogan to campaign for their candidate. Duterte's campaign presented him as a candidate with courage and empathy to the Filipino people.	
2016	Grace Poe	Gobyernong May Puso	lit. Government with a Heart	Main article: Grace Poe 2016 presidential campaign	
2016	Mar Roxas	Ituloy ang Daang Matuwid	lit. Continue the Straight Path	Main article: Mar Roxas 2016 presidential campaign	
2022	Ernesto Abella	Bagong Pilipino, Bagong Pilipinas	lit. New Filipinos, New Philippines		
2022	Leody de Guzman	Manggagawa Naman!	lit. Workers' turn!	Main article: Leody de Guzman 2022 presidential campaign	
2022	Norberto Gonzales	Puso, Giting at Dangal ng Pilipino	lit. Heart, Courage and Honor of the Filipino		
2022	Panfilo Lacson	Aayusin ang Gobyerno, Aayusin ang Buhay Mo	lit. [We'll] fix the government, fix your life	Main article: Panfilo Lacson 2022 presidential campaign	
2022	Bongbong Marcos	Sama-sama tayong babangon muli.	lit. Together, we shall rise again.	Main article: Bongbong Marcos 2022 presidential campaign	
2022	Jose Montemayor Jr.	Sa gabay ng Diyos, ang Bansa ay aayos	lit. With God's guidance, the nation will be orderly.		
2022	Isko Moreno	Tunay Na Solusyon, Mabilis Umaksyon!	lit. Real solution, quick to take action!	Main article: Isko Moreno 2022 presidential campaign	
2022	Manny Pacquiao	Panalo ang Mahirap, Panalo ang Pilipino!	lit. The poor win, the Filipino wins!	Main article: Manny Pacquiao 2022 presidential campaign	
2022	Leni Robredo	Gobyernong Tapat, Angat Buhay Lahat	lit. [With an] honest government, a better life for all	Main article: Leni Robredo 2022 presidential campaign	

== See also ==
- List of U.S. presidential campaign slogans
