= Benigno Aquino III 2010 presidential campaign =

Political campaign in the Philippines

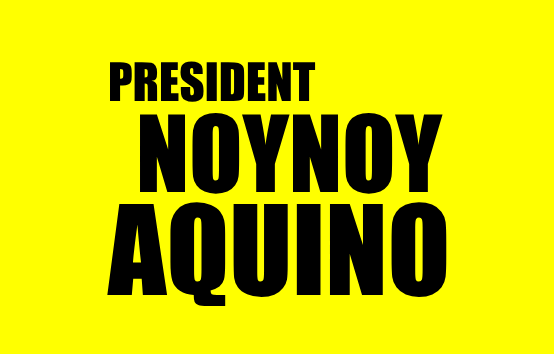
- Campaign: 2010 Philippine presidential election
- Candidate: Benigno "Noynoy" Aquino III; Senator of the Philippines (2007–2010); Manuel "Mar" Roxas II; Senator of the Philippines (2004–2010)
- Affiliation: Liberal; Akbayan; Aksyon Demokratiko
- Status: Won election: May 10, 2010
- Headquarters: Matrinco Building, Pasong Tamo (now Chino Roces Avenue), Makati, Philippines
- Key people: List of key people: Mar Roxas (VP nominee and chair, executive committee); Florencio Abad (overall campaign manager and member, executive committee); Sergio Osmeña III (former campaign manager); Edwin Lacierda (spokesperson); Erin Tañada (spokesperson); Paquito Ochoa Jr. (member, executive committee); Ballsy Aquino-Cruz (member, executive committee and finance team); Pinky Aquino-Abellada (member, executive committee and finance team); Viel Aquino-Dee (member, finance team); Kris Aquino (member, finance team and public relations); Cesar Purisima (member, finance team); Lito Banayo (media operations); Francis Escudero (media operations); Yolanda Ong (communications director); Maria Montelibano (communications head); Johnny Santos (communications head)
- Slogan(s): Kung Walang Corrupt, Walang Mahirap; Laban ng Tapat, Laban ng Lahat
- Chant: Noynoy!

Website
- www.noynoy.ph

The 2010 presidential campaign of Benigno Aquino III, then-Senator, began when he announced his candidacy for the presidency at the Club Filipino, Greenhills, San Juan, Metro Manila, on September 9, 2009, 40 days after the death of his mother, former President Corazon Aquino. On September 21, 2009, Aquino's campaign announced that Senator Mar Roxas would be his vice presidential nominee.

On June 9, 2010, Aquino was proclaimed by the Congress of the Philippines as President-elect of the Philippines, winning the election with 15,208,678 votes and defeating Former President Joseph Estrada of the Pwersa ng Masang Pilipino and seven other candidates. Roxas, his vice presidential nominee, narrowly lost to Estrada's running mate, Makati Mayor Jejomar Binay. Aquino, the tenth Philippine Senator to be elected president, was sworn in as the 15th President of the Philippines on June 30, 2010, at the Quirino Grandstand in Manila.

== Background ==
=== Roxas' candidacy ===
On November 26, 2008, the Liberal Party elected Mar Roxas, president of the Liberal Party, as the standard-bearer of the Liberal Party for President of the Philippines in the then-upcoming 2010 presidential elections.

=== Death of President Corazon Aquino ===
On August 1, 2009, former President Corazon Aquino died from colon cancer. Following her funeral, many people began calling on her son, Benigno Aquino III to run for President of the Philippines. This groundswell of support became known as the "Noynoy Phenomenon".

== Noynoy Aquino for President Movement ==
On August 27, 2009, Edgardo "Eddie" Roces, son of the late journalist and media executive Chino Roces, and a group of lawyers and activists formed the Noynoy Aquino for President Movement (NAPM), a nationwide campaign to collect a million signatures in order to persuade Aquino to run for president, reminiscent of Roces' father, who on October 15, 1985, launched the Cory Aquino for President Movement (CAPM), collecting more than one million signatures nationwide, asking Aquino's mother to run against Ferdinand Marcos in the 1986 presidential snap elections.

== Press conferences at the Club Filipino ==
In September 2009, the Liberal Party held numerous press conferences in relation to the 2010 elections at the Club Filipino in Greenhills, San Juan City, the site of the presidential inauguration of Aquino's mother in February 1986.

=== Roxas withdraws ===
On September 1, 2009, at the Club Filipino, in a press conference, Senator Mar Roxas, president of the Liberal Party and standard-bearer of the Liberal Party for President of the Philippines, announced his withdrawal from the presidential race and expressed his support for Aquino, as the standard-bearer of the Liberal Party for president. Aquino later stood side by side with Roxas, but did not make a public statement at the press conference.

=== Aquino accepts the bid for presidency ===
On September 2, 2009, in a press conference at the Club Filipino, Aquino announced that he would be going on a "spiritual retreat" over the weekend to finalize his decision for the 2010 presidential election, reminiscent of the decision of his mother, who in 1985, went on a retreat before giving her decision to run for the presidency during the snap elections in 1986. Aquino went on a retreat over the weekend, visiting the Carmelite sisters in Zamboanga City.

The following week, on September 9, Aquino officially announced his candidacy for the presidency in the then-upcoming elections.

=== Aquino-Roxas tandem ===
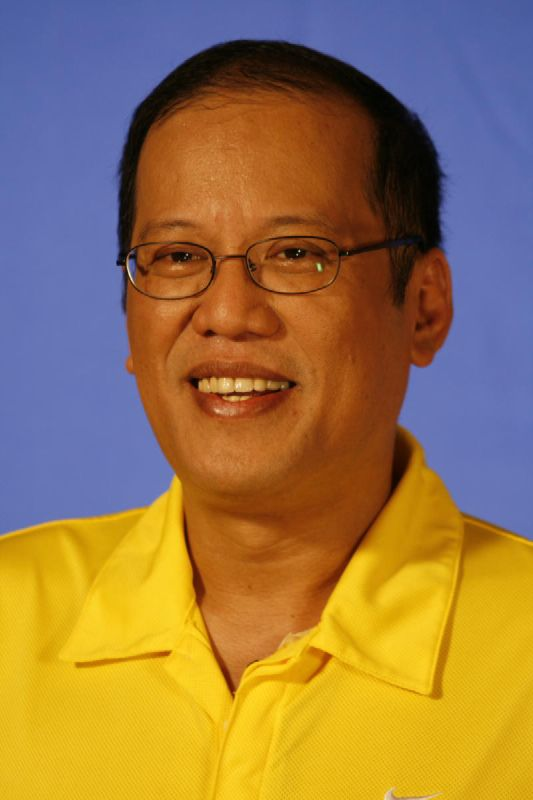
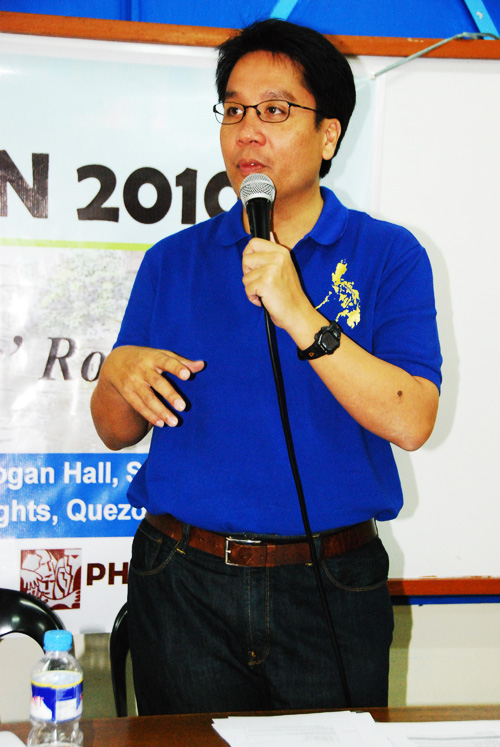
Liberal Party standard-bearers Benigno Aquino III (left), Mar Roxas (right)

On September 21, 2009, Roxas, alongside Aquino, officially announced his candidacy for the vice presidency, as the standard-bearer of the Liberal Party for vice president, launching the Aquino-Roxas tandem. On November 28, 2009, Aquino and Roxas filed their certificate of candidacy for president and vice president respectively.

== Opinion polling ==
From the time Aquino announced his candidacy for the presidency to Election Day, he had a commanding lead in the opinion polls.

Poll source	Date(s) conducted	Sample size	Margin of error	Acosta	Aquino	De los Reyes	Estrada	Gordon	Madrigal	Perlas	Teodoro	Villanueva	Villar	Other/ Undecided
2010
SWS	May 2–3	2,400	±2%	0	42	0.3	20	2	0.2	0.1	9	3	19	6
StratPOLLS	Apr. 27–May 2	1,500	—	—	45.2	0.2	22.2	1.5	0.2	0.6	10.1	3	15.1	—
The Center	Apr. 26–May 2	2,400	±2.8%	—	29	—	18	—	—	—	20	—	25	—
Manila Standard Today	Apr. 25–27	2,500	±2%	—	38	0.1	22	2	0.4	0.2	9	3	20	6
Pulse Asia	Apr. 23–25	1,800	±2%	—	39	0.2	20	2	0.1	0.3	7	3	20	9
Manila Standard Today	Apr. 18–20	2,500	±2%	—	38	—	19	1	—	—	9	2	23	6
SWS	Apr. 16–19	2,400	±2%	0	38	0.2	17	2	0.3	0.2	9	2	26	6
Pulse Asia	Mar. 21–28	3,000	±2%	0.08	37	0.2	18	2	0.1	0.3	7	2	25	9
SWS	Mar. 19–22	2,100	±2.2%	—	37	0.3	19	3	0.04	0.1	6	2	28	4.56
The Center	Mar. 3–10	2,400	±2.8%	—	26	0.5	17	9	0	0	14	2	28	—
SWS	Feb. 24–28	2,100	±2.2%	0.4	36	0.1	15	2	0.1	0.2	6	3	34	4
Pulse Asia	Feb. 21–25	1,800	±2%	0.04	36	0	18	1	0.3	0.2	7	2	29	6
TNS	Jan. 28–Feb. 3	3,000	±—%	—	41.54	—	11.66	1.7	0.22	—	5.21	2	30.63	—
Pulse Asia	Jan. 22–26	1,800	±2%	0.2	37	0.3	12	1	0.5	0.05	5	2	35	6
SWS	Jan. 21–24	2,100	±2%	0.3	42	0.2	13	2	0.4	0.04	4	2	35	2
StratPOLLS	Jan. 16–22	2,400	±2.2%	—	36	0.25	15	5	1	—	11	4	26	—
2009
SWS	Dec. 27–28	2,100	±2.2%	—	44	0.4	15	0.5	0.4	—	5	1	33	1
Pulse Asia	Dec. 8–10	1,800	±2%	—	45	—	19	1	—	—	5	1	23	5 (Note: 1% picked "others" while 4% picked none/refused/undecided.)
SWS	Dec. 5–10	2,100	±2.2%	—	46.2	0.1	16.0	1.1	0.2	0.03	4.6	1.1	27.0	3.7
The Center	Dec. 2–6	1,200	±2.8%	—	31	0.25	19	5	0.25	—	10	3	24	7.5

== Endorsements ==
In May 5, Iglesia ni Cristo (INC) endorses the tandem. Voting as a block, the INC has an estimated command votes of 5-8 million.

Benigno "Noynoy" Aquino

Philippine Congress

- Chiz Escudero, Senator (2007–2016), and former Congressman from Sorsogon
- Kiko Pangilinan, Senator (2001–2013), and former TV host

Local officials

- Rodrigo Duterte, Mayor of Davao City (1988–1998; 2001–2010; 2013–2016)
- Sara Duterte, Vice Mayor of Davao City (2007–2010)
- Alfredo Lim, Mayor of Manila (1992–1998; 2007–2016)
- Jesse Robredo, Mayor of Naga, Camarines Sur (2001–2010)

Celebrities

- Danny Javier, Filipino actor, musician, composer and Singer
- Boboy Garovillo, Filipino actor, musician, composer and Singer
- Jim Paredes, Filipino actor musician, composer, and Singer
- Noel Cabangon, Actor, musician, composer and Singer
- Boy Abunda, TV host and showbiz columnist
- Ogie Alcasid, Singer and songwriter
- Bea Alonzo, Actress
- Marjorie Barretto, actress and politician from Caloocan
- Sharon Cuneta, Actress
- Anne Curtis, Actress
- Dingdong Dantes, Actor
- Ai-ai delas Alas, comedienne
- Richard Gomez, Actor and politician from Leyte
- Bianca Gonzales, TV host
- Marian Rivera, Actress
- Mariel Rodriguez, TV host
- Erik Santos, singer
- Vilma Santos, actress and politician from Batangas
- Regine Velasquez, Singer

Athletes

- James Yap, basketball superstar and brother-in-law
- Cyrus Baguio, basketball player from Alaska Aces
- KG Canaleta, basketball player and Yap's teammate
- Larry Fonacier, basketball player from Alaska Aces
- Willie Miller, basketball superstar, former PBA MVP from Barangay Ginebra Kings
- Paolo Bugia, basketball player from Alaska Aces
- LA Tenorio, basketball player from Alaska Aces
- Enrico Villanueva, basketball player from San Miguel Beermen

Businessperson & producers

- Juno Gallardo, film director
- Dondon Monteverde, relative of Regal Films matriarch Lily Monteverde
- Boy So, owner of La Carmela de Boracay and friend of Boy Abunda
- Tony Tuviera, TAPE Inc. official

News

- Tonipet Gaba, TV host

Organizations

- Iglesia ni Cristo
Mar Roxas

Philippine Congress

- Kiko Pangilinan, Senator (2001–2013), and former TV host

Local officials

- Rodrigo Duterte, Mayor of Davao City (1988–1998; 2001–2010; 2013–2016)
- Sara Duterte, Vice Mayor of Davao City (2007–2010)

Organizations

- Iglesia ni Cristo
- Kingdom of Jesus Christ

== Senatorial slate ==
The senatorial lineup called "Landas ng Pagbabago" slogan slate was dubbed "SLAMAT LORRRD" as an acronym for each candidates, present during the motorcade were S for Sonia Roco, L for ex-mutineer Danny Lim, A for Neric Acosta, M for Martin Bautista, A for Alex Lacson, T for TG Guingona, L for Yasmin Busman-Lao, O for Senator and 1998 Liberal Vice Presidential nominee Serge Osmeña, R for Muntinlupa Mayor Ruffy Biazon, R for former Senator and cabinet member Ralph Recto, R for Akbayan Representative Risa Hontiveros, and D for former Senator Franklin Drilon, who also serves as Liberal's party president.

Name	Party	Occupation	Elected
Neric Acosta	Liberal	Academic, political scientist, and former Congressman from Bukidnon	No
Martin Bautista	Liberal	Medical doctor	No
Ruffy Biazon	Liberal	Congressman from Muntinlupa	Yes
Franklin Drilon	Liberal	Senator and former Senate President	Yes
TG Guingona	Liberal	Congressman from Bukidnon	Yes
Risa Hontiveros	Liberal (Note: Originally from Akbayan, but Liberal in the ballot)	Activist and Party-list representative for Akbayan	No
Alex Lacson	Liberal	Lawyer	No
Yasmin Lao	Liberal	Muslim leader	No
Danilo Lim	Independent	Former military officer and ex-muntineer	No
Serge Osmeña	Independent	Senator and former 1998 vice presidential nominee of Liberal	Yes
Ralph Recto	Liberal	Economist and former Senator	Yes
Sonia Roco	Liberal (Note: Originally from Aksyon, but Liberal in the ballot)	Educator, widow of former Senator Raul Roco	No

== Fake psychiatric reports ==
During the 90-day election campaign period from February 9–May 8, 2010, fake psychiatric reports on Aquino's mental health began circulating.

According to Aquino, his camp had received information that the first fake psychiatric report on his mental state that was circulated on the Internet came from the wife of Guido Delgado, a supporter of the Nacionalista Party. Aquino noted that the supporter's move was made with "malicious intent".

An unidentified supporter of Senator Manny Villar, president of the Nacionalista Party and its presidential nominee, sent a second fake psychiatric report to Villar's volunteer center located at Star Mall in Mandaluyong. The psychiatric report was presented in a restaurant in Quezon City, during a press conference held by Guido Delgado, a supporter of the Nacionalista Party and former president of the National Power Corporation (NAPOCOR). The psychiatric report was supposedly signed by Father Jaime C. Bulatao, S.J., PhD, a Jesuit priest, a professor of Psychology and a clinical psychologist at the Ateneo de Manila University, taken when Aquino was finishing his bachelor's degree in economics at the Ateneo de Manila University in 1979, showed that Aquino suffered from depression and melancholia, however, Father Bulatao had denied writing or signing the psychiatric report.

A fake third psychiatric report on Aquino's mental state was circulated on the Internet. The psychiatric report was supposedly signed by Father Carmelo A. Caluag II, S.J, a Jesuit priest at the Ateneo de Manila University. The psychiatric report showed that Aquino suffered from major depressive disorder, however, Father Caluag had denied having made any psychiatric evaluation of Aquino. The psychiatric report was disowned by the Ateneo de Manila University Psychology Department.

Aquino described the release of another fake psychiatric report as an "act of desperation" of his political opponents to besmirch his reputation. Aquino dismissed his "psychiatric evaluation", saying its release only showed how desperate his rivals were.

== Aquino-Binay (NoyBi) ==
Aquino-Binay Campaign

During the ninety-day election campaign period, Senator Francis Escudero began endorsing Aquino as President of the Philippines, and Jejomar Binay, the standard-bearer of PDP Laban for vice president, as Vice President of the Philippines, launching the Aquino-Binay campaign. However, this was done without the consent of the two candidates, since Escudero, Aquino and Binay all came from different political parties. Aquino had Mar Roxas as his running mate for vice president, while Binay was former President Joseph Estrada's running mate for vice president. The Aquino-Binay campaign endorsed by Escudero was successful as the Congress of the Philippines proclaimed Aquino and Binay the winners of the 2010 elections for president and vice president on June 9, 2010.

== Election day and proclamation by Congress ==
During the 2010 presidential election, held on May 10, 2010, in unofficial tallies, conducted by the Commission on Elections (COMELEC) and the Parish Pastoral Council for Responsible Voting (PPCRV), Aquino was the leading candidate in tallied votes for president, and in the official Congressional canvass, Aquino was the leading candidate in canvassed votes for president. Aquino was unofficially being referred to as "President-apparent" by the media.

On June 9, 2010, at the Batasang Pambansa, in Quezon City, the Congress of the Philippines proclaimed Aquino as the President-elect of the Philippines, following the 2010 election with 15,208,678 votes, while Jejomar Binay, the former mayor of Makati, was proclaimed as the Vice President-elect of the Philippines with 14,645,574 votes, defeating runner-up for the vice presidency Mar Roxas, the standard-bearer of the Liberal Party for vice president.

== See also ==
- Mar Roxas 2010 presidential campaign
- Gilbert Teodoro 2010 presidential campaign, his cousin's presidential campaign
