= Nationalist People's Coalition =

Conservative political party in the Philippines

- Leader: Mark Cojuangco
- Chairman: Tito Sotto
- President: Jack Duavit
- Secretary–General: Mark Llandro Mendoza
- Spokesperson: Mark Enverga
- Founder: Danding Cojuangco
- Founded: February 5, 1991 (as Partido Pilipino); 1992; 34 years ago (as NPC)
- Split from: Nacionalista Party
- Headquarters: 808 Building, Meralco Avenue, San Antonio, Pasig, 1605 Metro Manila
- Newspaper: NPC Herald
- Ideology: Filipino nationalism Conservatism; Social conservatism
- Political position: Centre-right
- National affiliation: Bagong Pilipinas (2024–present) Former: Nationalist People's Coalition (1995) LAMMP (1998) PPC (2001) KNP (2004) TEAM Unity (2007; Teodoro wing) GO (2007; Escudero–Legarda wing) Team PNoy (2013) PGP (2016) HNP (2019) UniTeam (2021–2024)
- Coalition members (1995): NPC; PRP; KBL
- Colors: Green, red, white
- Senate: 6 / 24
- House of Representatives: 35 / 318
- Provincial Governors: 9 / 82
- Provincial Vice Governors: 6 / 82
- Provincial Board members: 58 / 840

The Nationalist People's Coalition (NPC; Filipino: Makabayang Koalisyon ng Mamamayan) is a conservative political party in the Philippines which was founded by business tycoon Danding Cojuangco.

== History ==
=== Formation ===
In 1990, amid political and economic uncertainty in the aftermath of the 1986 People Power Revolution, members of civil society and business groups invited businessman Danding Cojuangco, a former associate of deposed President Ferdinand Marcos and estranged cousin of President Corazon Aquino, to lead a national coalition for the 1992 national elections. Cojuangco's supporters, who called themselves Friends of Danding, began organizing because of limited time before the polls.

Cojuangco expressed interest in running under the Nacionalista Party, where he had long-standing ties, provided the nomination process was fair. Two other national figures were also seeking the party nomination, Senator Juan Ponce Enrile and Vice President Salvador Laurel, the latter being the party president. Internal disputes arose between Laurel and former Rizal Governor Isidro Rodriguez, who supported Cojuangco, over the nomination rules. With the issues unresolved and the party divided, Cojuangco's backers formed a new party, Partido Pilipino, led by Fernando Barican, Antonio Gatmaitan, and Butch Valdes. The Commission on Elections officially registered the party on February 5, 1991.

The Nacionalistas eventually split into the Laurel and Rodriguez wings, with the latter supporting Cojuangco. A court ruling in favor of the Laurel wing prompted Cojuangco's allies to consolidate under a broader umbrella group, the Nationalist People's Coalition. This coalition included the NP-Rodriguez wing, Kilusang Bagong Lipunan, Partido Pilipino and its regional parties such as Bagong Lakas ng Nueva Ecija, sectoral groups, and independent politicians backing Cojuangco.

=== Ramos administration ===
==== 1992 presidential election ====
In the 1992 presidential election, Cojuangco ran for president under the NPC–Partido Pilipino banner with Senator Joseph Estrada, whose Partido ng Masang Pilipino coalesced with NPC, for vice president. Other NPC candidates for various races ran under affiliated parties. Cojuangco placed third, losing to Marcos' cousin Fidel V. Ramos, who was endorsed by President Aquino, while Estrada won the vice presidential race in a landslide. Following the elections, Partido Pilipino was renamed as the Nationalist People's Coalition, formalizing the group into a political party whose leadership was transferred to newly-elected NPC officers. The NPC joined the Lakas–NUCD-led Rainbow Coalition, a caucus coalition in the House of Representatives formed with multiple national parties.

In the 1995 Senate election, the NPC became the official opposition coalition against the administration Lakas–Laban Coalition, led by President Ramos and Senator Edgardo Angara of Laban ng Demokratikong Pilipino. The party's senatorial slate included half-termer senators Nikki Coseteng and Arturo Tolentino, Ilocos Norte representative Bongbong Marcos of KBL, former military mutineer Gregorio Honasan and 1992 People's Reform Party presidential candidate Miriam Defensor Santiago. Senate President Ernesto Maceda, then the party leader, reportedly conceded NPC's defeat to President Ramos days before the election, as the latter claimed. Only Santiago, Honasan and Coseteng managed to win Senate seats.

=== Estrada administration ===
The NPC coalesced with Angara's LDP, Estrada's PMP, and the PDP–Laban of former senator Nene Pimentel, to form Laban ng Makabayang Masang Pilipino for the 1998 national elections. LAMMP served as the political vehicle of Vice President Estrada in that year's presidential election. In the House elections, some youngster politicians who were elected into Congress under LAMMP were dubbed as the Bright Boys, including NPC-affiliated neophyte congressmen Francis Escudero, Gilbert Teodoro and Ace Durano.

Following the juetenggate scandal in October 2000, House Speaker Manny Villar of LAMMP successfully presided over the impeachment of President Estrada in the House plenary. The pro-Estrada group ousted Villar from office and tapped Arnulfo Fuentebella as his replacement, making this the only time when a current NPC member held the House speakership. The NPC left the rapidly disintegrating LAMMP after Estrada was removed from power in January 2001.

=== Arroyo administration ===
When Gloria Macapagal Arroyo assumed the presidency in January 2001, her Lakas–CMD-led People Power Coalition became the dominant group in Congress. The 75-member ruling party led the "Sunshine Coalition," which included the 61-member NPC, members of the Liberal Party, and several other minor parties, while the LDP led the 20-member opposition bloc. Having no candidate for the 2001 Senate election, the NPC junked five opposition candidates from Puwersa ng Masa, namely Defense Secretary Orly Mercado, former Social Welfare and Development undersecretary Jamby Madrigal, Muslim Mindanao leader Ombra Tamano, former senator Santanina Rasul, and former Information undersecretary Reuben Canoy.

In 2003, NPC stalwarts led by Escudero and Teodoro filed an impeachment complaint against Chief Justice Hilario Davide Jr. for allegedly misusing judiciary funds for acquiring luxury cars and homes. However, the complaint, despite successfully gaining enough signatures to proceed, was ruled unconstitutional by the Supreme Court. Rumors speculated that the coalition would be abolished, as pro-impeachment congressmen, mainly from the NPC, were disappointed with the failure of Davide's impeachment, as well as that there emerged a faction lacking satisfaction over the leadership of House Speaker Jose de Venecia Jr. Some party members prompted the NPC to quit the ruling coalition ahead of the 2004 national elections and join the opposition, to no avail.

In 2003, the NPC and LDP backed party founder Cojuangco as a potential contender for the 2004 presidential election. However, Cojuangco, the NPC chairperson, decided not to run for the second time. Before the end of the year, the NPC was sending mixed signals on whether to stay on the administration camp or jump into the opposition. Although the NPC had no seats in the Senate, the party had 53 seats in the House of Representatives that time. Eventually, the NPC was divided, with Cojuangco, his sons Charlie and Mark, and nephew Teodoro supporting incumbent President Arroyo's full-term bid, while the other faction led by Escudero, Maceda and Darlene Antonino Custodio supported opposition bet Fernando Poe Jr. of Koalisyon ng Nagkakaisang Pilipino. Escudero, who became Poe's spokesperson, berated the Arroyo administration for alleged widespread cheating and vehemently protested in the congressional canvassing of presidential votes.

==== 2005 ====
In mid-2005, led by Escudero, the party's House leader, the anti-Arroyo NPC congressmen launched an impeachment complaint against President Arroyo amid the outbreak of the Hello Garci scandal, featuring leaked audio recordings that exposed Arroyo and COMELEC Commissioner Virgilio Garcillano allegedly conspiring to rig the canvassing of presidential votes and ensure her win. Ultimately, the Lakas-led House crushed the impeachment by a vote of 158–51.

==== 2007 ====
With Escudero and newly-sworn member Loren Legarda joining the Genuine Opposition, LDP stalwarts Tito Sotto and Tessie Aquino-Oreta left LDP and joined the NPC, running as senatorial candidates under the administration coalition, TEAM Unity. Sotto claimed that several GO supporters and politicians were also defecting to the NPC. Escudero and Legarda managed to win, while Sotto and Aquino-Oreta failed to regain their seats.

==== 2010 ====
In 2009, two of NPC's former House stalwarts, Escudero and National Defense Secretary Teodoro left the party for their presidential ambitions in the 2010 national elections. Teodoro launched his presidential campaign under the Arroyo-led Lakas–Kampi–CMD, while Escudero ultimately withdrew his bid and launched NoyBi, pairing Liberal presidential candidate Benigno Aquino III and PDP–Laban vice presidential bet Jejomar Binay, who was the running mate of Estrada, the PMP standard bearer. The NPC, led by its new chairman Faustino Dy Jr., forged a coalition with the Nacionalista Party to support the presidential campaign of Senator Manny Villar, selecting NPC's Legarda as Villar's running mate.

=== Aquino, Duterte, and Marcos Jr. administrations ===
With Senator Tito Sotto's assumption as party chairman, the NPC forged an alliance with the administration coalition Team PNoy. However, Sotto chose to side with Vice President Binay's UNA, with Cagayan Representative Jack Enrile as one of its senatorial candidates.

After Cojuangco's death in 2020, the NPC supported the vice presidential campaign of party chairman Sotto. Meanwhile, in the presidential race, majority of voters who supported Sotto preferred former senator Bongbong Marcos, instead of Senator Panfilo Lacson, who was Sotto's running mate. Sotto ultimately lost to Davao City Mayor Sara Duterte, Marcos' running mate under UniTeam.

==== Sotto and Escudero ====
After his senatorial comeback in the 2025 elections, Sotto was embattled with fellow NPC member Escudero for the Senate presidency. Senator JV Ejercito, another NPC stalwart, proposed a term-sharing agreement, wherein Escudero would stay for the next few months and would be succeeded by Sotto. With the majority of NPC senators voting to retain Escudero as Senate president, Legarda joined Sotto in the minority.

Amid the flood control scandal in 2025, Escudero was alleged to have received donations from flood control contractors for his 2022 senatorial bid, which he denied. With 15 votes which included all NPC members except Escudero, Escudero was ousted as Senate president and succeeded by Sotto.

== 1995 election ==
The NPC fielded a 12-person Senatorial slate in the 1995 elections as an opposition party to the administration of President Fidel V. Ramos. They ran against the administration-backed Lakas–Laban Coalition.

Candidate	Party	Occupation / Previous position	Elected
Rose Marie Arenas	NPC	Businesswoman	No
Gaudencio Beduya	NPC	Former representative from Cebu	No
Anna Dominique Coseteng	NPC	Senator	Yes
Amanda T. Cruz	NPC	Businesswoman	No
Ramon Fernandez	NPC	Professional basketball player	No
Gregorio Honasan	Independent	Former colonel	Yes
Bongbong Marcos	KBL	Representative from Ilocos Norte son of Ferdinand Marcos	No
Adelisa A. Raymundo	NPC	Former labor sectoral representative	No
Manuel C. Roxas	NPC	Lawyer	No
Almarin C. Tillah	NPC	Chair of the Bangsamoro National Congress	No
Arturo Tolentino	NPC	Senator	No
Miriam Defensor Santiago	PRP	Former Bureau of Immigration and Deportation commissioner, 1992 presidential candidate	Yes

== Candidates ==
=== 2007 election ===
In the 2007 elections, the party won 26 seats:

- Mark Cojuangco
- Faustino Dy Jr.
- Giorgidi Aggabao
- Michael John Duavit
- Mark Llandro Mendoza
- Arthur Y. Pingoy Jr.
- Vicente Sotto III
- Ace Durano
- Anthony Golez
- Avelino Razon
- Ernesto Maceda
- Estelito Mendoza
- Darlene Antonino Custodio
- Daisy Avance Fuentes
- Sixto Brillantes
- Loren Legarda
- Anna Dominique Coseteng
- Sherwin T. Gatchalian
- Francis Nepomuceno
- Vic Amante
- Evelio Leonardia
- Joan V. Alarilla
- Angelito Gatlabayan
- Luis Asistio
- Ding Roman
- Enrique Cojuangco
- Claude Bautista
- Emmanuel "Manny" Piñol
- Juan Ponce "Jack" Enrile Jr.
- Eleanor Begtang
- Arnulfo P. Fuentebella
- Crisanto S. Rances
- Felix William B. Fuentebella
- Elizabeth "Tita Beth" A. Delarmente
- Francis "Chiz" Escudero
- Tom P. Bongalonta, Jr.

=== 2010 ===
==== 2010 presidential elections ====
Loren Legarda – Vice-presidential candidate from the Nacionalista Party and LDP (lost)

Senate:

- Miriam Defensor Santiago (under the PRP and guest candidate of Lakas–Kampi, LDP, Nacionalista and PMP) (won)
- Rodolfo Plaza (guest candidate from PMP) (lost)
- Tito Sotto (won)

=== 2013 ===
Senate:

- Loren Legarda – guest candidate from Liberal Party/Team PNoy (won)
- Jack Enrile – guest candidate from Pwersa ng Masang Pilipino/United Nationalist Alliance (lost)
- Edward Hagedorn – independent (lost)

=== 2016 ===
- President: Grace Poe (lost)
- Vice President: Francis Escudero (lost)

Senate:

- Win Gatchalian (won)
- Tito Sotto (won)

=== 2019 ===
Senate:

- Jinggoy Estrada (guest candidate, lost)
- JV Ejercito (lost)
- Lito Lapid (won)
- Imee Marcos (guest candidate, won)
- Grace Poe (guest candidate, won)
- Bong Revilla (guest candidate, won)

=== 2022 ===
Vice President: Tito Sotto (lost)

Senate:

- Herbert Bautista (lost)
- Win Gatchalian (won)
- Loren Legarda (won)
- Francis Escudero (won)
- JV Ejercito (won)
- Manny Piñol (lost)

=== 2025 ===
Senate:

- Abby Binay (lost)
- Tito Sotto (won)
- Lito Lapid (won)
- Panfilo Lacson (won) (Guest candidate albeit running Independent)

== Electoral performance ==
=== Presidential and vice presidential elections ===
Year	Presidential election			Vice presidential election		
Year	Candidate	Vote share	Result	Candidate	Vote share	Result
1992	Eduardo "Danding"; Cojuangco Jr.	18.17%	Fidel Ramos (Lakas)	Joseph Estrada	33.00%	Joseph Estrada (NPC)
1998	None		Joseph Estrada (PMP)	None		Gloria Macapagal Arroyo (Lakas)
2004	None (Note: NPC faction led by Chiz Escudero endorsed Fernando Poe Jr. for president, while Cojuangco–Teodoro–Yap wing supported Gloria Macapagal Arroyo.)		Gloria Macapagal Arroyo (Lakas)	None (Note: NPC endorsed Loren Legarda for president.)		Noli de Castro (Independent)
2010	None (Note: Legarda's running mate was Manny Villar, a Nacionalista.)		Benigno Aquino III (Liberal)	Loren Legarda	12.21%	Jejomar Binay (PDP–Laban)
2016	None (Note: NPC endorsed Grace Poe for president.)		Rodrigo Duterte (PDP–Laban)	None (Note: NPC endorsed Chiz Escudero (Independent) for vice president.)		Leni Robredo (Liberal)
2022	None (Note: There are no official Presidential standard bearer even Sotto has running mate (Ping Lacson) who is independent.)		Bongbong Marcos (PFP)	Vicente Sotto III	15.89%	Sara Z. Duterte (Lakas)

=== Legislative elections ===
Congress of the Philippines
Year	Seats won	Result	Year	Seats won	Ticket	Result
1992	30 / 200	LDP plurality	1992	5 / 24	Single party ticket	LDP win 16/24 seats
1995	22 / 204	Lakas–Laban majority	1995	1 / 12	NPC ticket	Lakas–Laban win 9/12 seats
1998 (Note: Contested in an electoral alliance with LDP and PMP as LAMMP. Seat total consists of 55 LAMMP representatives and 9 NPC representatives elected outside the LAMMP alliance.)	64 / 258	Lakas plurality	1998	1 / 12	LAMMP	LAMMP win 7/12 seats
2001	40 / 256	Lakas plurality	2001	Not participating		People Power win 8/13 seats
2004	53 / 261	Lakas plurality	2004	0 / 12	KNP	K4 win 7/12 seats
2007	28 / 270	Lakas plurality	2007	2 / 12	Split ticket	GO win 8/12 seats
2010	29 / 286	Lakas–Kampi plurality	2010	1 / 12	Split ticket	Liberal win 4/12 seats
2013	42 / 292	Liberal plurality	2013	1 / 12	Split ticket	Team PNoy win 9/12 seats
2016	42 / 297	Liberal plurality	2016	1 / 12	PGP	Daang Matuwid win 7/12 seats
2019	37 / 304	PDP–Laban plurality	2019	1 / 12	Split ticket	Hugpong win 9/12 seats
2022	35 / 316	PDP–Laban plurality	2022	4 / 12	Split ticket	UniTeam win 6/12 seats
2025	31 / 317	Lakas plurality	2025	2 / 12	Bagong Pilipinas	Bagong Pilipinas win 6/12 seats

== Elected members ==
=== 20th Congress (2025–present) ===
==== Senate ====
Senators of NPC in 2025
Name	Took office
JV Ejercito	June 30, 2022
Francis Escudero	June 30, 2022
Win Gatchalian	June 30, 2022
Lito Lapid	June 30, 2025
Loren Legarda	June 30, 2022
Tito Sotto	June 30, 2025

==== District Representatives ====
District Representatives of NPC in 2025
Name	District	Took office
Jess Marquez	Aklan's 1st congressional district	June 30, 2025
Florencio Miraflores	Aklan's 2nd congressional district	June 30, 2025
Antonio Legarda Jr.	Antique's at-large congressional district	June 30, 2022
Eleanor Begtang	Apayao's at-large congressional district	June 30, 2022
King Collantes	Batangas's 3rd congressional district	June 30, 2025
Josefina Tallado	Camarines Norte's 1st congressional district	June 30, 2019
Nelson Legacion	Camarines Sur's 3rd congressional district	June 30, 2025
Arnulf Bryan Fuentebella	Camarines Sur's 4th congressional district	June 30, 2019
Roy Loyola	Cavite's 5th congressional district	June 30, 2022
Patricia Calderon	Cebu's 7th congressional district	June 30, 2025
Claude Bautista	Davao Occidental's at-large congressional district	June 30, 2022
Cheeno Almario	Davao Oriental's 2nd congressional district	June 30, 2022
Solomon Chungalao	Ifugao's at-large congressional district	June 30, 2019
Ronald Singson	Ilocos Sur's 1st congressional district	June 30, 2022
Kristine Singson-Meehan	Ilocos Sur's 2nd congressional district	June 30, 2019
Mark Anthony Santos	Las Piñas's at-large congressional district	June 30, 2025
Lolita Javier	Leyte's 2nd congressional district	June 30, 2019
Giselle Lazaro-Maceda	Manila's 4th congressional district	June 30, 2025
Jules Ledesma	Negros Occidental's 1st congressional district	June 30, 2025
Mercedes Alvarez–Lansang	Negros Occidental's 6th congressional district	June 30, 2022
Jose Alvarez	Palawan's 2nd congressional district	June 30, 2022
Mark Cojuangco	Pangasinan's 1st congressional district	June 30, 2022
Roman Romulo	Pasig's at-large congressional district	June 30, 2019
Mark Enverga	Quezon's 1st congressional district	June 30, 2019
Reynante Arrogancia	Quezon's 3rd congressional district	June 30, 2022
Keith Micah Tan	Quezon's 4th congressional district	June 30, 2022
Mia Ynares	Rizal's 1st congressional district	June 30, 2025
Dino Tanjuatco	Rizal's 2nd congressional district	June 30, 2022
Jose Arturo Garcia Jr.	Rizal's 3rd congressional district	June 30, 2022
Dennis Hernandez	Rizal's 4th congressional district	June 30, 2025
Dette Escudero	Sorsogon's 1st congressional district	June 30, 2022
Wowo Fortes	Sorsogon's 2nd congressional district	June 30, 2022
Roger Mercado	Southern Leyte's 1st congressional district	June 30, 2025
Jaime Cojuangco	Tarlac's 1st congressional district	June 30, 2022
Bong Rivera	Tarlac's 3rd congressional district	June 30, 2022
Kenneth Gatchalian	Valenzuela's 1st congressional district	June 30, 2025

== Current party officials ==
- President: Jack Duavit
- Chairman: Vicente Sotto III
- Secretary-General: Mark Llandro Mendoza
- Spokesperson: Mark Enverga
- Senate President: Sherwin Gatchalian

== Party leadership history ==
=== Chairman ===
Chairperson	Term start	Term end
Danding Cojuangco	1991	2009
Faustino Dy Jr.	2009	2013
Tito Sotto	2013	present

== See also ==
- Nacionalista Party
- Pwersa ng Masang Pilipino, their former coalition partner in 1998
- Laban ng Demokratikong Pilipino, their former coalition partner in 1998
