= Mar Roxas 2010 presidential campaign =

First presidential campaign attempt of Mar Roxas

- Campaign: 2010 Philippine presidential election
- Candidate: Mar Roxas; Senator of the Philippines (2004 – 2010); Secretary of Trade and Industry (2000 – 2003); Capiz's 1st district representative (1993 – 2000)
- Affiliation: Liberal
- Status: Noynoy Aquino's running mate
- Key people: Benigno "Noynoy" Aquino III (campaign manager)
- Slogan: Lalaban Tayo! (We will fight!)

The 2010 presidential campaign of Mar Roxas, a Philippine senator started from being elected as Liberal's nominee and standard bearer for the 2010 presidential elections on November 26, 2008. Roxas then known as an anti-Arroyo opposition member.

== Pre-campaign ==
On November 27, 2007, Liberal Party held a meeting to discuss and conduct an election to known who will replace Franklin Drilon as the party president. Mar Roxas, his Senate colleague Noynoy Aquino was both nominated, but the latter became the party president. Roxas stated the following on his acceptance speech:

My fellow Liberals, in a few minutes, we shall witness the torch of party leadership passed to a man who will make the LP a sturdy and modern bridge to the next generation through lessons learned from the past.

Every member shall be given every opportunity to shine through his advocacy of ideas and integrity of character. We shall build a strong, united and modern LP rooted in its founding principles, sharpening its purpose and lead it to victory in 2010

Even though congratulated by DENR secretary Lito Atienza, the ousted former chairman and the leader of "Atienza faction" or "Pro-Arroyo faction", he later criticized the election, and called Drilon and his allies "merry cabal of destabilizers". He also stated that the other faction violated Supreme Court's call for a status quo.

On September 24, 2008, Roxas urged the Liberal Party to unite. He also attended in December of the same year a protest against constitutional convention proposal of Arroyo.

== Campaign ==
Roxas released a political ad in 2009, when he was riding in a pedicab as a passenger that is peddled by a young boy, and then Roxas takes over to peddle. The ad became a meme on some social media sites.

In a survey in conducted in July 28 to August 10, Roxas receives 11 percent (5th place) in the survey, behind Chiz Escudero with 12 percent (4th place), then-Vice President Noli de Castro with 16 percent (3rd place), former President Joseph Estrada in second place with 19 percent, and topped by former senate president Manny Villar with 25 percent (1st place).

On August 1, 2009, former President Cory Aquino died due to cancer. Due to her death, her son— and Mar's campaign manager— Noynoy, considered to run as president. The party members also proposed for Roxas to slide down as Noynoy's vice president to form the Noy-Mar tandem.

== Withdrawal ==
Roxas withdraws September 1, 2009, in order to give way for then-popular Senator Noynoy Aquino. In September 9, Senator Aquino officially announces his bid for presidency. In September 21, Roxas accepts vice presidential offer of Aquino.

== See also ==
- Mar Roxas 2016 presidential campaign
- Benigno Aquino III 2010 presidential campaign
