= Gilbert Teodoro 2010 presidential campaign =

Philippines presidential campaign of Gilbert Teodoro

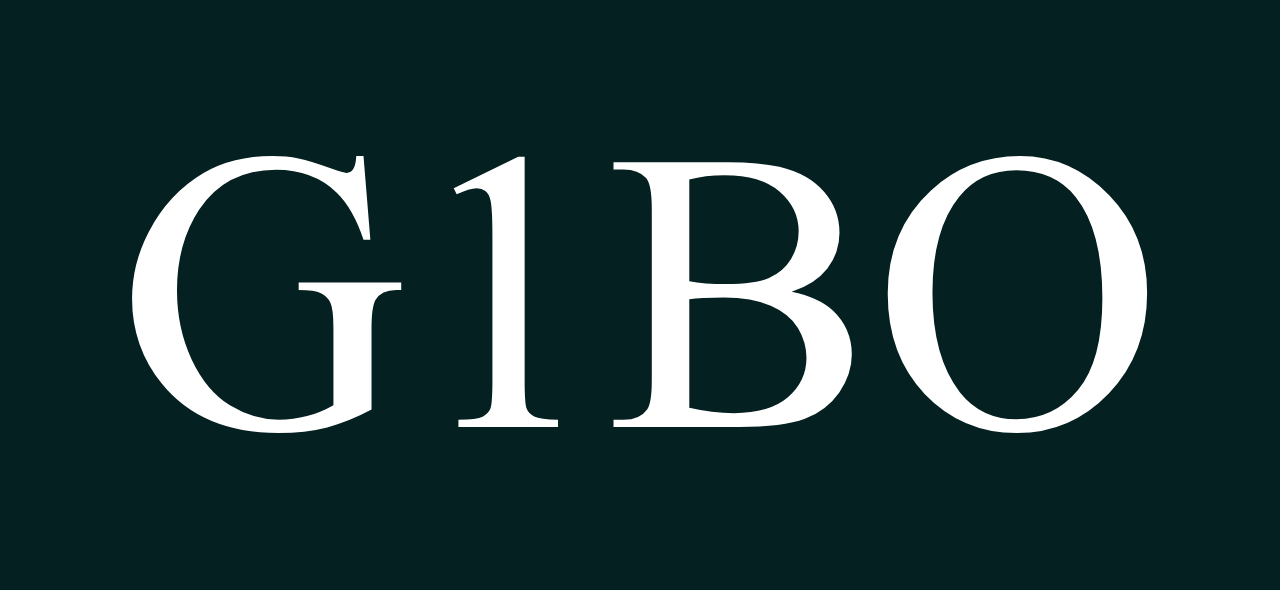
- Campaign: 2010 Philippine presidential election
- Candidate: Gilbert Teodoro; Secretary of National Defense (2007–2010); Edu Manzano; Chairman of the Optical Media Board (2004–2009)
- Affiliation: Lakas–Kampi
- Status: Lost election: May 10, 2010
- Slogan(s): Sulong Gibo! Galing at Talino

The 2010 presidential campaign of Gilbert "Gibo" Teodoro was formally launched in November 2009, upon nomination acceptance in Lakas–Kampi National Convention at the Philippine International Convention Center.

== Lakas nomination ==
In July 2009, Defense Secretary Gilbert "Gibo" Teodoro resigned from Nationalist People's Coalition, a party led by his uncle Danding Cojuangco. Teodoro sworn in as new member of newly merged Lakas–Kampi. Teodoro's admission to Lakas will be a possible sign for seeking nomination for president.

MMDA Chairman Bayani Fernando insisted that the party should choose an “original” and “loyal” member, and not the one who only joined the party to seek nomination. Lakas also considered many candidates as its presidential nominee, such as Vice President Noli de Castro, former House Speaker Sonny Belmonte, Dick Gordon, Former PNP chief and DPWH Secretary Hermogenes "Jun" Ebdane, even though not a party member, and Actor and Senator Bong Revilla. By September, Teodoro filed his name on the nomination process, and Lakas shortlisted the party's choices between Teodoro and Fernando. In October, Ronaldo Puno was poised to be his running mate.

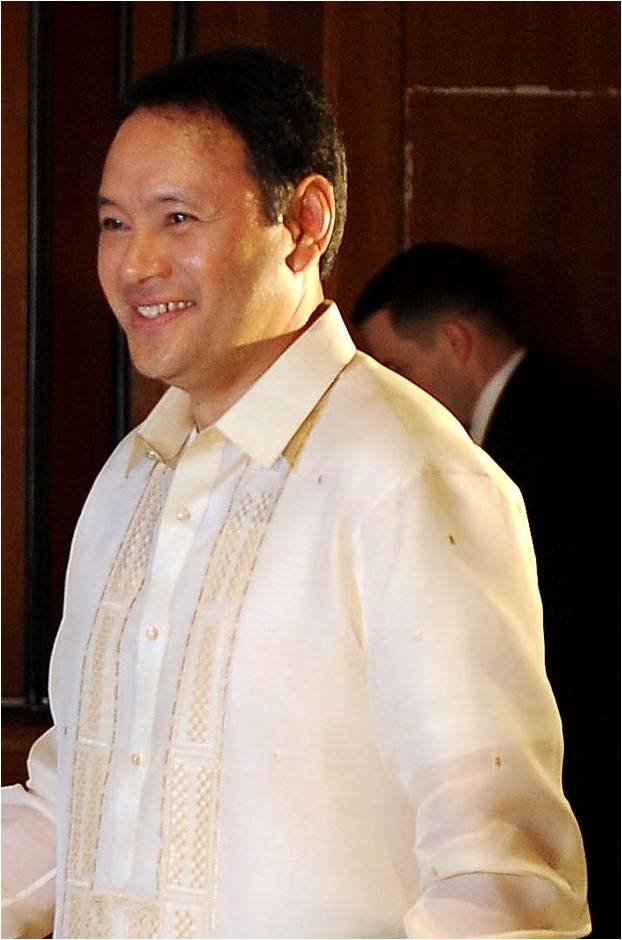
Lakas–Kampi presidential nominee Gilbert Teodoro

In November, after a September executive voting result of 42–5 through secret balloting, Teodoro was officially picked by his party as nominee for presidential election in 2010. Teodoro picked actor, TV host, and former Makati Vice Mayor Edu Manzano as his running mate.

== Campaign ==
Teodoro during his party's Grand Rally at Rizal Memorial Stadium in Manila.

Teodoro's campaign platform includes encouraging political growth in the provinces and improving healthcare and education. He has also stated that he would not interfere if Arroyo were to be charged at a later date.

On November 20, Gloria Macapagal Arroyo resigned her post as the Chairman of the Lakas–Kampi–CMD and handed over the post to Teodoro.

A crowd estimate of 135,000 rallied behind Teodoro and his party during the grand rally in Manila.

Teodoro's campaign slogan was "Galing at Talino" (capability and competence). According to him, public service does not only entail integrity, but ability and competence as well because people are looking for clear plans and not just mere promises and most of all positive campaigning. During the campaign, he shunned from mudslinging and encouraged other Presidentiables to do away with smear campaigning because it breeds disunity among Filipinos.

== Issues ==
=== Villaroyo issue ===
In the campaign for 2010, rumor speculated that President Gloria Macapagal Arroyo did not support Teodoro, as the latter only ranked fourth in the survey, behind his cousin Noynoy Aquino, Manny Villar, and former president Joseph Estrada. The rumor also said that Arroyo supported Villar's campaign, thus earning a 'Villaroyo' title, with combining the surname of Villar and Arroyo. Arroyo denied the accusation and voiced out her support at Teodoro's campaign.

=== Support base ===
Cebu congresswoman Nerissa Soon-Ruiz of One Cebu supported Teodoro's campaign, and urged the people of Cebu to support and vote him. But in the holy week of 2010, she supported Villar's campaign.

== Result ==
Teodoro eventually lost to his cousin and Manzano lost to Makati mayor Jejomar Binay, his familiar opponent in 2001 Makati elections. Teodoro conceded with a statement of what hurt him most is the betrayal of people he trusted.

== See also ==
- Benigno Aquino III 2010 presidential campaign
- Manny Villar 2010 presidential campaign
