= Naging Mahirap =

2009 Filipino-language jingle

Song by Baseco Kids
- Released: 2009
- Genre: Jingle
- Songwriter: Merlee Jayme

"Naging Mahirap" (lit. 'Became Poor'), also referred to by its incipit "Nakaligo Ka Na Ba sa Dagat ng Basura", (Note: English: "Have You Ever Bathed in a Sea of Garbage") is a Filipino-language campaign jingle of Senator Manny Villar's campaign for the 2010 Philippine presidential election. Written by Merlee Jayme, the jingle was released with its accompanying television advertisement in late 2009, sung by the Baseco Kids. Jayme cited Villar's speech at the Manila Overseas Press Club on October 29, 2009 as the primary inspiration for the lyrics of the song, which emphasizes the impoverished background of the presidential candidate. It was later sung by Sarah Geronimo in February 2010 upon her endorsement of Villar at the launching of the political youth group Katropa, established by Villar's daughter Camille.

Upon its release, "Naging Mahirap" became highly popular among Filipino citizens, especially among the youth. It also attracted criticism for its allegedly inaccurate portrayal of his early life in Tondo, Manila. In a February 2010 press release, Villar expressed surprise at people doubting the song's accuracy, explaining that the first two lines come from actual events in his life and stating that people do not truly comprehend what it means to be poor, adding that the point of the song is to question whether the other presidential candidates experienced poverty as some of them claimed. By April, however, journalist Howie Severino and GMA News TV investigated the poverty claims of Villar through interviews and archival research, and concluded that he was from a middle-class family. A Facebook page against Villar parodied the song with its page name, "sige MANNY VILLAR ikaw na ang MAHIRAP..." (transl. Okay Manny Villar you are the poor one...); by May 2010, the page had amassed over 120,000 members.

In 2019, Villar became the richest person in the Philippines, mainly due to valuation of the mainly illiquid publicly listed stock of one of his companies, "Golden MV Holdings, Inc." (PSE:HVN)

== See also ==
- Manny Villar 2010 presidential campaign
