= Joseph Estrada 2010 presidential campaign =

Presidential campaign for the 2010 Philippine elections

- Campaign: 2010 Philippine presidential election
- Candidate: Joseph Estrada; President of the Philippines (1998–2001); Jejomar Binay; Mayor of Makati (2001–2010)
- Affiliation: UNO; PMP; PDP–Laban
- Status: Lost election: May 10, 2010
- Slogan(s): Kung may Erap, may Ginhawa. (transl. If there’s Erap, there’s prosperity)

The 2010 Presidential campaign of Joseph Estrada, the former president of the Philippines, was announced on September 26, 2009. His vice-presidential running mate was Jejomar Binay, the mayor of Makati from 2001 to 2010. Binay originally aspired to be president but resigned to Estrada. Just after his announcement and filing of candidacy, he was met with a disqualification case, which was eventually dismissed by the Commission of Elections (COMELEC) and the Supreme Court of the Philippines.

He opened his campaign on February 9 at Plaza Miranda, vowing to regain his position as president. He held rallies in many places of the Philippines. His slogan was "Kung may Erap, may ginhawa" (transl. If there’s Erap, there’s prosperity) with his jingle "Erap para sa mahirap" (transl. Erap for the poor) following a similar name. Estrada used high airtime on ads in ABS-CBN and GMA Network. According to COMELEC documents, Estrada allegedly spent P235.5 million, with donations from multiple businessmen.

In his slate, Estrada had candidates, with Gwen Pimentel being dropped. Only two of them won, namely Juan Ponce Enrile and Jinggoy Estrada. He supported peace and order, demolishing corruption, and the poor.

He was the second overall, losing to Benigno Aquino III.

== Background ==
=== Presidency ===
Estrada ran under the Laban ng Makabayang Masang Pilipino in the 1998 Philippine presidential election. He won the elections, garnering 10,722,295 votes, or 39.86% of the vote. He took his oath and inaugural address on June 30, 1998. He created the Saguisag commission during his tenure for the anomalies of the Ramos administration. Estrada was criticized for his corruption and eventually took part in a trial.

=== Trial and EDSA III ===
After EDSA II, a 2001 political protest that overthrew Estrada, occurred in January 2001, Estrada was charged by the Ombudsman of the Philippines with plunder and perjury. Eventually, he was sentenced to reclusión perpetua. He was cleared of perjury but was guilty of plunder. He was sentenced to 40 years in prison. He also forfeited a mansion and more than P731 million. On April 24, 6,000 police officers stood to arrest Estrada while 6,000 loyalists protested in Metro Manila. From April 25 to 30, an estimated 150,000 protesters gathered at the EDSA Shrine. On May 1, around 150,000 protesters marched to the Malacañang Palace and were dissipated the same day.

== Announcement ==
In 2008, 80,250 signatures supporting Estrada's run were shown to him to convince him to run for the elections. On September 26, 2009, Joseph Estrada announced his run for presidency. He stated that the opposition couldn't find a suitable candidate, leading him to run himself. Senator Juan Ponce Enrile confirmed his decision, stating that he believes it was a done deal. Sources stated that he formalized his deal in a Tondo church. Margaux Salcedo, then spokesperson of Estrada, stated that he would later formalize his campaign plan.

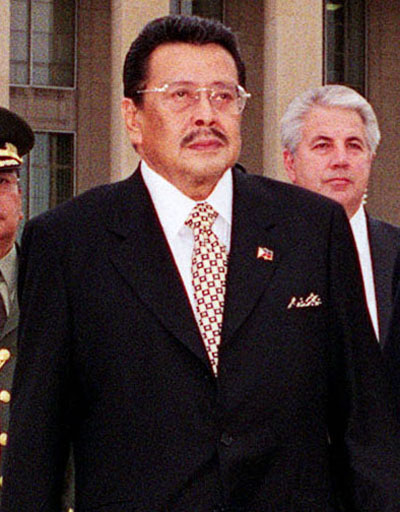
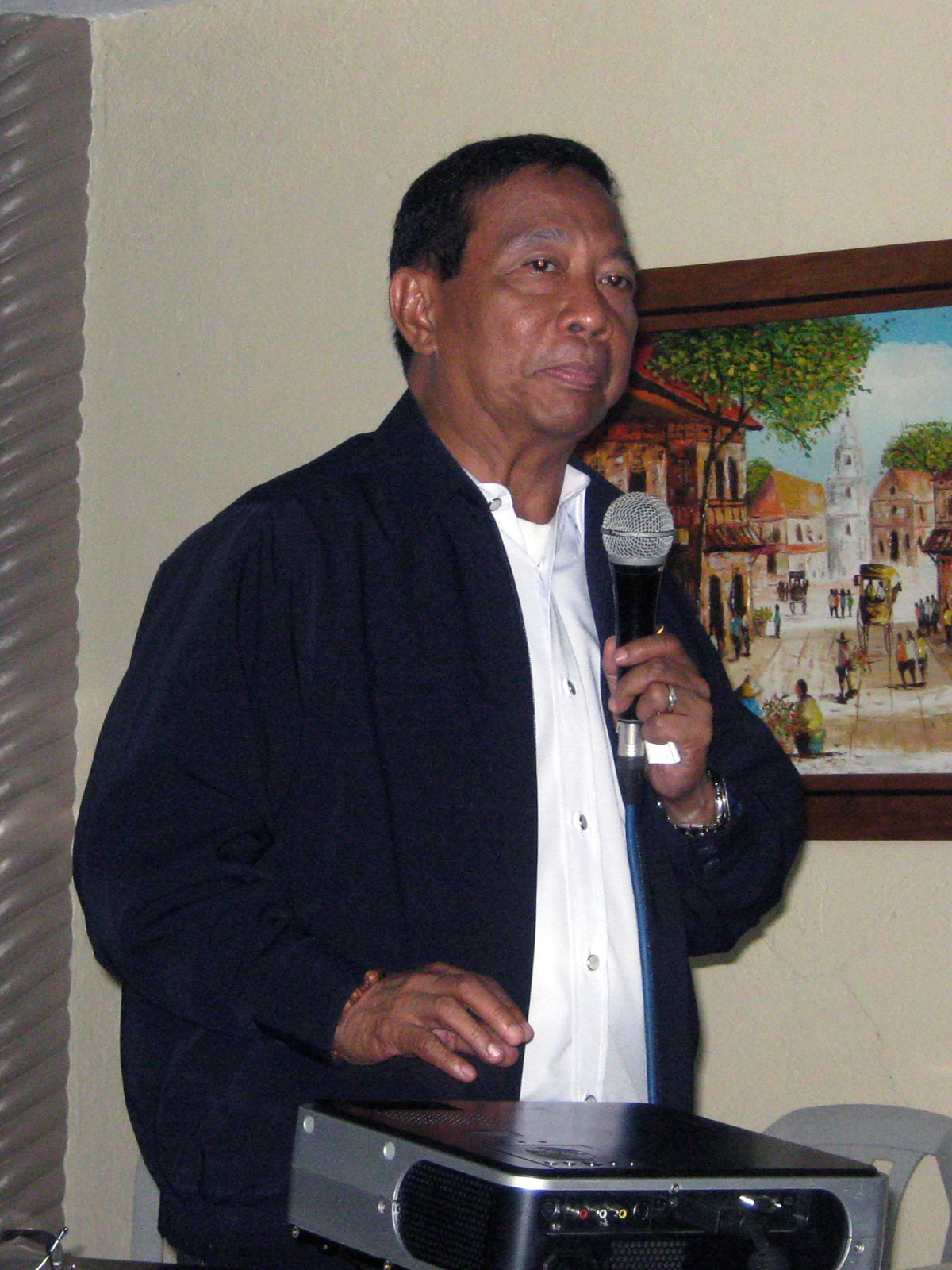
Candidates Joseph Estrada (left) and Jejomar Binay (right)

=== Binay candidacy ===
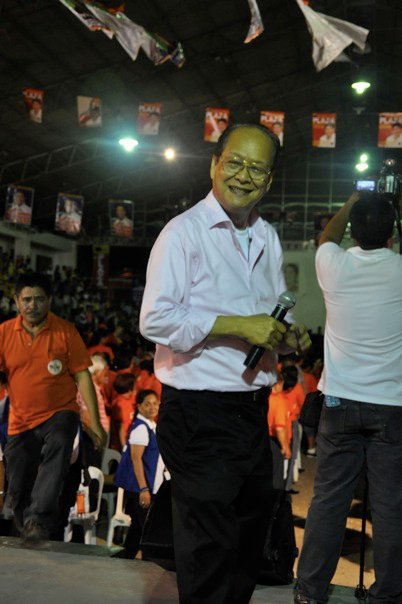
Then-Senate President Ernesto Maceda campaigning for the presidency of Joseph Estrada.

Then-Makati Mayor Jejomar Binay announced his intent to run in the 2010 election in his 66th birthday celebration at the Makati City Hall if the United Opposition nominated him, likening himself to United States president Barack Obama. He cited major controversies in the Arroyo administration. Binay then supported the presidential run of Estrada, stating that he would not run for a position if Estrada does not choose Binay as his running mate.

=== Disqualification case ===
On October 28, the Commission on Elections of the Philippines dismissed the disqualification case against Estrada. He formed a legal panel to defend his bid. The panel stated that if he lost, he would be replaced by another candidate. On December 9, the Supreme Court of the Philippines dismissed his disqualification case. His disqualification case was officially denied by the Supreme Court on January 19, with COMELEC following on May 4.

=== Running mate ===
According to opposition sources, Estrada's running mate was going to be Francis Escudero. Estrada's running mate eventually was Jejomar Binay, the former mayor of Makati. The Chairman of the Metropolitan Manila Development Authority, the Governor of Manila, the 3rd Chairman of the Housing and Urban Development Coordinating Council, and the Presidential Adviser for the Overseas Filipino Workers.

== Campaign ==
Estrada started his campaign on February 9 at Plaza Miranda. In the rally, he vowed to regain his position as president. Estrada held a sortie in Laoag, Ilocos Norte on February 25, commemorating the People Power Revolution. In San Jose del Monte, Bulacan, Senator Miriam Defensor Santiago endorsed Estrada along with 3,000 people on February 26. A rally was held on April 24 in Cagayan de Oro with an expected attendance of 30,000. A grand rally was held on May 5 in Malolos, Bulacan. According to research by the Philippine Department of Sociology in 2017, poor citizens were loyal to Estrada despite his alleged poor record. According to The Philippine Star, Estrada was the most "charming" of the presidential aspirants.

=== Branding and ads ===
He aired ads stating that he will continue his programs which he started when he was ousted as president. His slogan was "Kung may Erap, may ginhawa" (transl. If there’s Erap, there’s prosperity). His jingle was titled "Erap para sa mahirap" (transl. Erap for the poor) focusing that the Filipinos are his "top priority". It was connected to the slogan that brought him to win in the 1998 elections. By March 18, Estrada only had 42.5 minutes of airtime in ABS-CBN and 55 minutes for GMA Network. In the last five weeks, Estrada spent ₱100.7 million in his ad campaign, P20 million more than his combined expenses. This could have led Estrada to overtake Villar in the presidential race.

=== Expenses ===
Many Arroyo-allied businessmen donated to the campaign of Estrada. According to COMELEC documents, Estrada allegedly spent ₱235.5 million. Binay gained ₱231 million for his campaign, but he spent ₱218 million. Estrada gained ₱227.5 million in donations, mostly from businessmen such as Enrique K. Razon and Antonio Evangelista. He also gained donations from Henry Sy. In a campaign sortie in Gapan on February 18, he acknowledged that the campaign had "money problems".

== Senatorial slate ==
Originally on the slate line up in August 2009 were Then-Senate President Juan Ponce Enrile, Then-Senate pro-Tempore Jinggoy Estrada, General Danilo Lim, Jose de Venecia III, Ted Failon, and Edu Manzano. People who were considered were also Bongbong Marcos, Teodoro Locsin Jr., Grace Poe, and Teodoro Casiño. Gwen Pimentel was dropped from the slate on February 7 because of inter-party tensions.

- JV Bautista (PMP), 36th
- Joey De Venecia (PMP), 15th
- Juan Ponce Enrile (PMP), 5th
- Jinggoy Estrada (PMP), 2nd
- Jun Lozada (PMP), 28th
- Regalado Maambong (KBL), 47th
- Rodolfo Plaza (NPC), 35th
- Francisco Tatad (GAD), 26th
- Dropped candidates (candidate who were part of the line up but removed later):
  - Gwen Pimentel (PDP–Laban), 20th

== Political positions ==
He supported peace and order after the shooting of a teacher and an alleged slay in the Gaisano Mall of Davao. He opposed the presidency of Gloria Macapagal Arroyo. During a rally on May 5, Estrada stated that he supported the poor and the masses. In an interview with The Philippine Star, he planned to eliminate graft and corruption. He supported continuing the use of geothermal energy. He also supported farm-to-market roads. He supported the liberalization of the media, stating that it gives competition and more jobs. According to Bulatlat, he supported land reform. if he won, Estrada would've legalized jueteng, a numbers game.

== Aquino-Binay campaign and results ==
On the campaign period, Senator Francis Escudero endorsed Benigno Aquino III and Jejomar Binay for president and vice president, sparking the Aquino-Binay campaign.

== See also ==
- Jejomar Binay 2016 presidential campaign
