= Benigno Aquino III and Jejomar Binay 2010 presidential campaign =

Campaign launched by Chiz Escudero for Noynoy Aquino

NoyBi
- NoyBi Campaign 2010
- Campaign: 2010 Philippine presidential election
- Candidate: Noynoy Aquino (Liberal); Jejomar Binay (PDP–Laban)
- Affiliation: None
- Status: Won election, May 10, 2010
- Headquarters: Parc House Building, EDSA
- Key people: Chiz Escudero; Pastor “Boy” Saycon; Jose “Peping” Cojuangco; Billy Esposo; Mikee Cojuangco-Jaworski; Maria Montelibano; Tingting Cojuangco; Robert Jaworski, Jr. Conrado de Quiros
- Receipts: (May 10, 2010)

The Noynoy–Binay campaign or NoyBi began when Senator Francis Escudero endorsed the candidates Benigno "Noynoy" Aquino III and Jejomar Binay as president and vice president respectively. This was done without the consent of the two candidates, especially since Escudero, Binay, and Aquino all come from different political parties. Aquino had Manuel "Mar" Roxas II as his running mate for vice president, while Binay was the vice presidential candidate of Joseph Estrada, who was aiming to be elected president for a second time. The campaign was nonetheless successful as Aquino and Binay were elected as president and vice president of the Philippines.

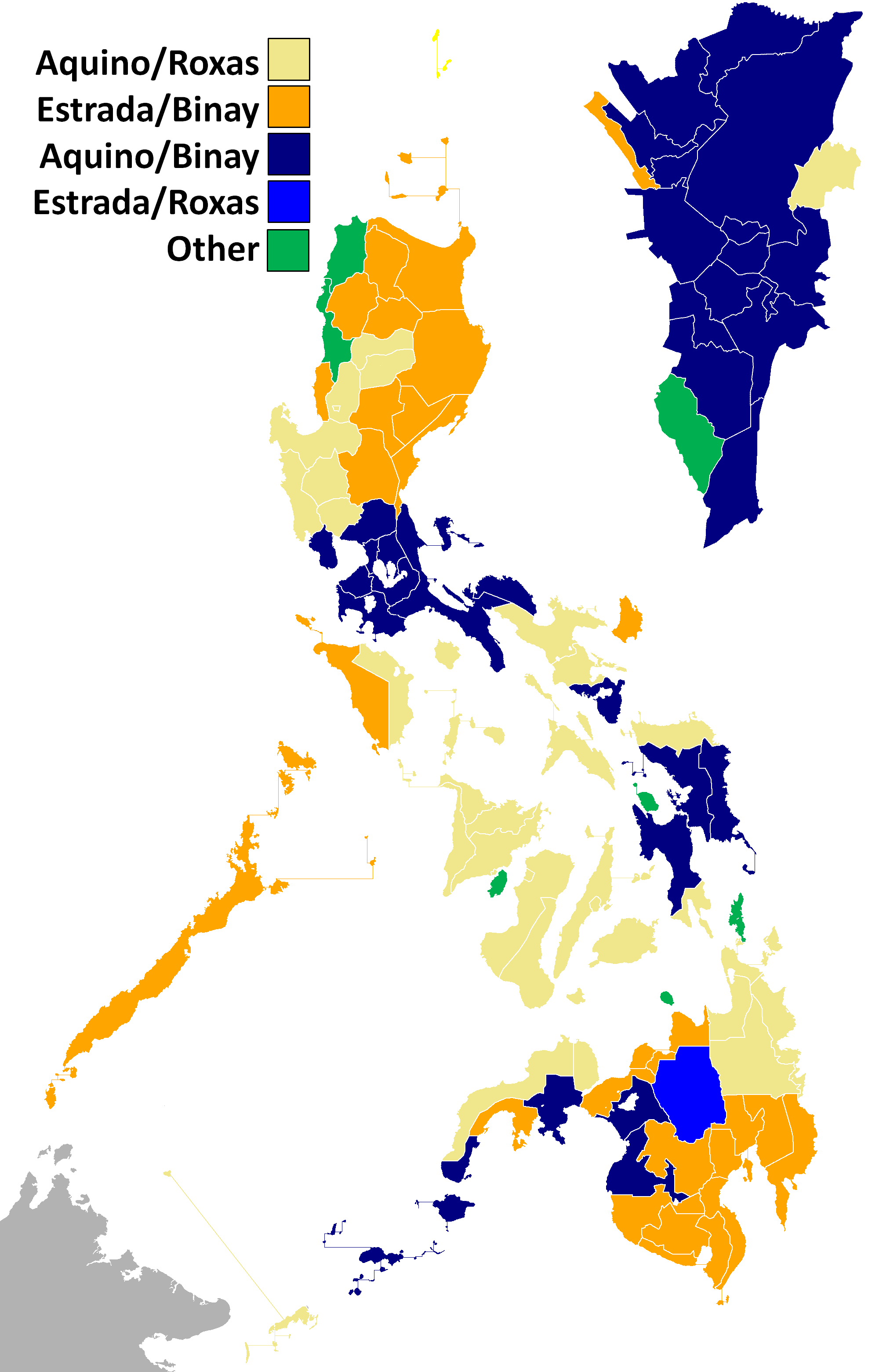
Winning presidential and vice presidential candidates per province/city in the elections. Note that the two positions are voted separately and voters can split their votes.

== Various campaign headquarters ==
- University of Makati
- Parc House, EDSA
- Samar Mansion, South Triangle, Quezon City

== See also ==
- 2010 Philippine presidential election
