= Manny Villar 2010 presidential campaign =

Presidential campaign of Manny Villar

- Campaign: 2010 Philippine presidential election
- Candidate: Manny Villar; Senator (2001–2013); Loren Legarda; Senator (2007–2013)
- Affiliation: Nacionalista; NPC; Makabayan
- Status: Lost election: May 10, 2010
- Slogans: Tapusin ang Kahirapan; Sipag at Tiyaga

The 2010 presidential campaign of Manny Villar was formally announced in September 2008.

== Before election campaign ==
In 2008, Manny Villar, the then-Senate president, topped the presidential surveys despite his involvement in the C-5 Road Project issue. In same year, he declared that he intended to run for president, possibly partnering with the Nationalist People's Coalition and having either former 2004 vice presidential candidate and Senator Loren Legarda or Senator Chiz Escudero as his running mate. Villar eventually chose Legarda as his running mate.

== Senate slate ==
Villar organized the Senate slate of his ticket, composed of incumbent senator Pia Cayetano, Bongbong Marcos (who joined Nacionalista with his family due to a dispute with KBL members), Susan Ople, former Marine Colonel Ariel Querubin, former news reporter and congressman Gilbert Remulla, former military captain Ramon Mitra III, professor Adel Tamano, incumbent senator Miriam Defensor Santiago of the People's Reform Party, Gwen Pimentel of PDP–Laban, activist Liza Maza, and Bayan Muna and NDF member Satur Ocampo.

Name	Party	Occupation	Elected
Pia Cayetano	Nacionalista	Incumbent Senator	Yes
Miriam Defensor Santiago	PRP	Incumbent Senator	Yes
Bongbong Marcos	Nacionalista	Congressman, former Governor of Ilocos Norte	Yes
Liza Maza	Independent	Labor activist	No
Ramon Mitra III	Nacionalista	Former military officer	No
Satur Ocampo	Bayan Muna	Activist and NDF member	No
Susan Ople	Nacionalista	Undersecretary for the Department of Labor and Employment	No
Gwen Pimentel	PDP–Laban	Human rights activist	No
Ariel Querubin	Nacionalista	Former marine officer and awardee	No
Gilbert Remulla	Nacionalista	Former Journalist, Congressman from Cavite	No
Adel Tamano	Nacionalista	Professor in PLM	No

== Campaign ==
From 2008 to 2009, Villar was the top choice in surveys on preferred presidential bets. However, due to the death of former president Cory Aquino, the surveys started to favor her son Senator Noynoy Aquino. At first, they had a tight race, with the popularity of Manny Villar's jingle Naging Mahirap (or Nakaligo ka na ba sa Dagat ng Basura) prompting the creation of internet and Facebook memes about it online. He also used the slogan "Tapusin ang Kahirapan" (Tagalog for "End poverty").

== Controversies ==
=== "Villaroyo" ===
In the start of the campaign for 2010, rumors speculated that Villar was a 'secret candidate' of President Arroyo, as Arroyo had a negative trust rating of -53. Thus, Defense Secretary Gilbert Tedoro, the presidential nominee of the then-merged Lakas Kampi party also had low ratings in the surveys which earned him the 'Villaroyo' title (a combination of the surnames Villar and Arroyo). Villar denied the accusation and his rating eventually plummeted with former president Joseph Estrada surpassing him at second place.

=== C-5 road project issue ===
The reopening of the C-5 road project issue also affected Villar's survey ratings as Satur Ocampo, one of the members of his senate slate, said that he should face senate hearings about the issue.

=== Controversy over dominant-minority status ===
In the 2010 general election, the Nacionalista and the Nationalist People's Coalition (NPC) formed an alliance after it was approved by the Commission on Elections (COMELEC) on April 12, 2010. Villar chose Senator Loren Legarda, who is a member of the NPC, as his running mate. It became the dominant minority party after a resolution passed by the COMELEC. The coalition was made to help the Nacionalista Party boost the presidential campaign of Senator Villar and have a chance once again to be designated dominant-minority party status by the COMELEC which would have given them the rights to poll watchers during the canvassing of votes.

The alliance, however, was challenged by the Liberal Party, which was also seeking the same party status from the COMELEC, as they called the said alliance a "bogus alliance." On April 21, 2010, the alliance was blocked by the Supreme Court after a suit filed by the rival Liberal Party. On May 6, 2010, the Supreme Court nullified the merger therefore giving the dominant minority party status to the Liberal Party. The Supreme Court decision was also based on a COMELEC resolution requiring political parties to be accredited by August 17, 2009. Several local races were also being challenged from both parties, therefore causing confusion in those races.

== Endorsements ==
Manny Villar

National legislators

- Ace Acedillo, Congressman
- Ferjenel Biron, Member of the Philippine House of Representatives from Iloilo's 4th district (2004–present)
- Bongbong Marcos, former Governor of Ilocos Norte (1998–2007), and congressman from Ilocos Norte's 1st district (2007–2010)
- Sonny Trillanes, Former navy officer, and Senator of the Philippines (2007–2019)
- Edgardo Angara, Senator (1987–1998, 2001–2013)

Local officials

- Chavit Singson, Governor of Ilocos Sur (1972–1986; 1992–2001; 2004–2007)
- Isko Moreno, Actor and councilor of Manila's 1st district councilor (1998–2007), Vice Mayor of Manila (2007–2016)
- Jerry Treñas, Mayor of Iloilo City (1992, 2001–present) and candidate of Iloilo's at-large district

Celebrities

- Sarah Geronimo, Singer and actress
- Willie Revillame, TV host and former comedian
- Manny Pacquiao, boxer and candidate for congressman
- Dolphy Quizon, Comedian

Organizations

- Laban ng Demokratikong Pilipino
- Magdalo

== Result ==
Villar eventually lost to fellow senator Noynoy Aquino while Legarda lost to Makati mayor Jejomar Binay. Villar said in his concession speech that even if he lost, his mission to defeat poverty will not end.

== See also ==
- Naging Mahirap, campaign's main theme song or jingle
- Gilbert Teodoro 2010 presidential campaign
