= 2010 Philippine presidential election =

15th election of the Philippine president

- May 10, 2010
- Turnout: 74.34% (▼2.0pp)

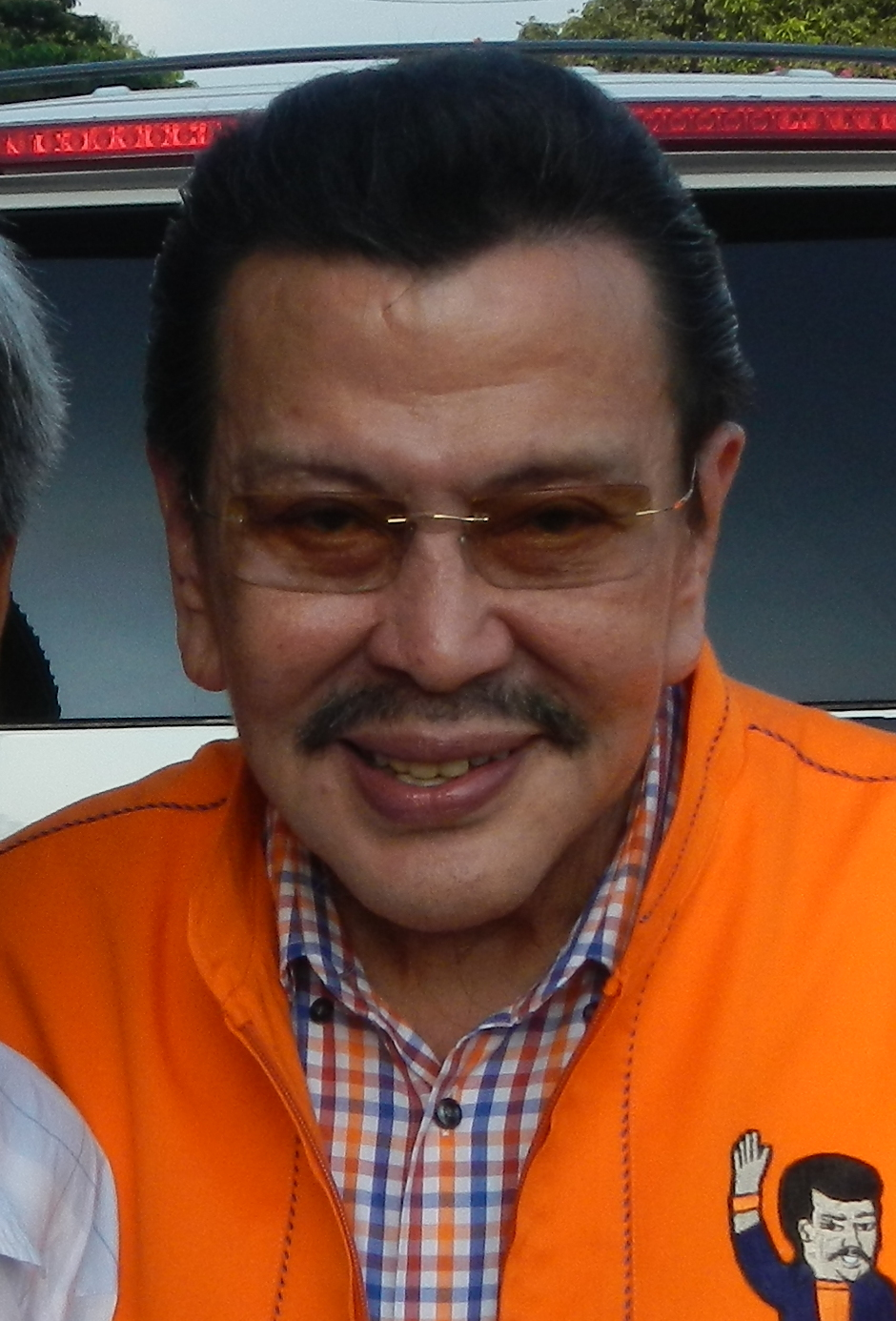

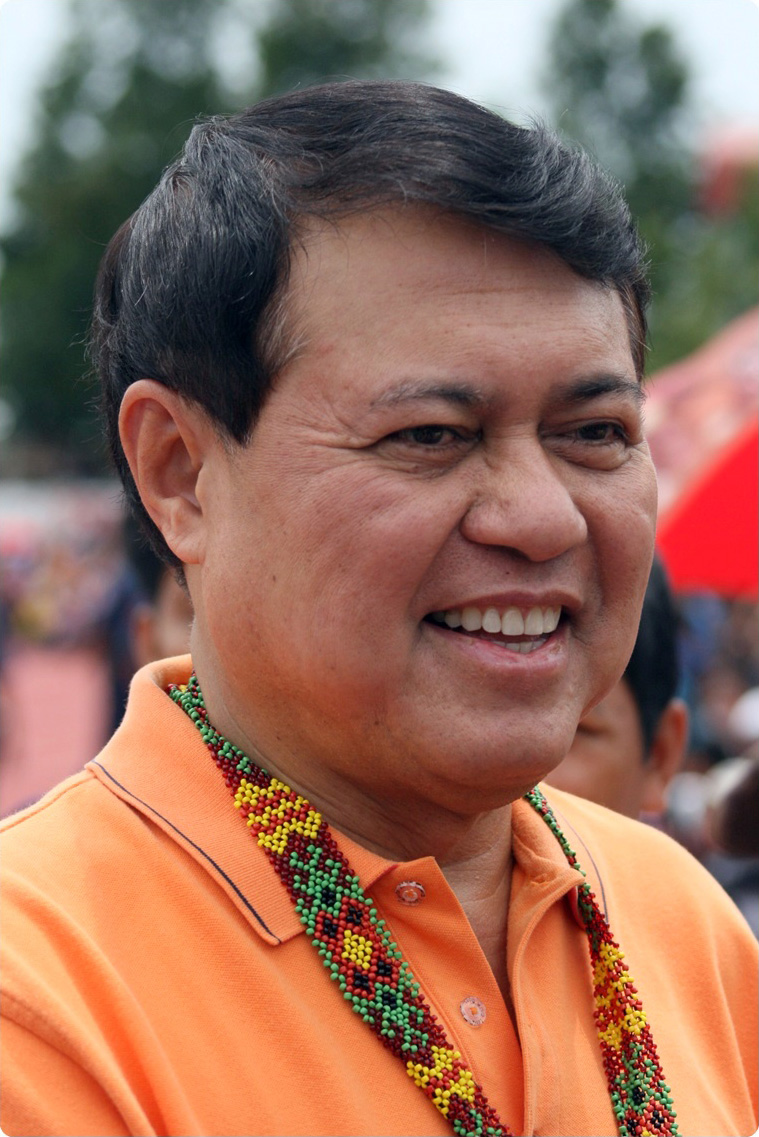

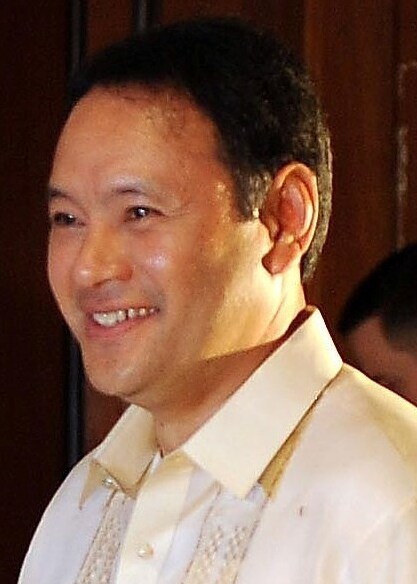
Candidate	Benigno Aquino III	Joseph Estrada
Party	Liberal	PMP
Running mate	Mar Roxas	Jejomar Binay
Popular vote	15,208,678	9,487,837
Percentage	42.08%	26.25%
Candidate	Manny Villar	Gilbert Teodoro
Party	Nacionalista	Lakas–Kampi
Running mate	Loren Legarda	Edu Manzano
Popular vote	5,573,835	4,095,839
Percentage	15.42%	11.33%
- Results according to the final congressional canvass.
President before election
Gloria Macapagal Arroyo
Lakas–Kampi
Elected President
Benigno Aquino III
Liberal
- 2010 Philippine vice presidential election
- May 10, 2010
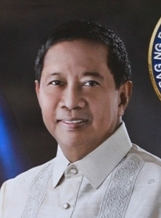

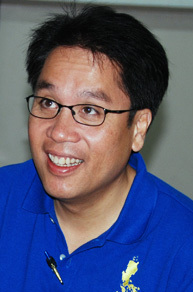

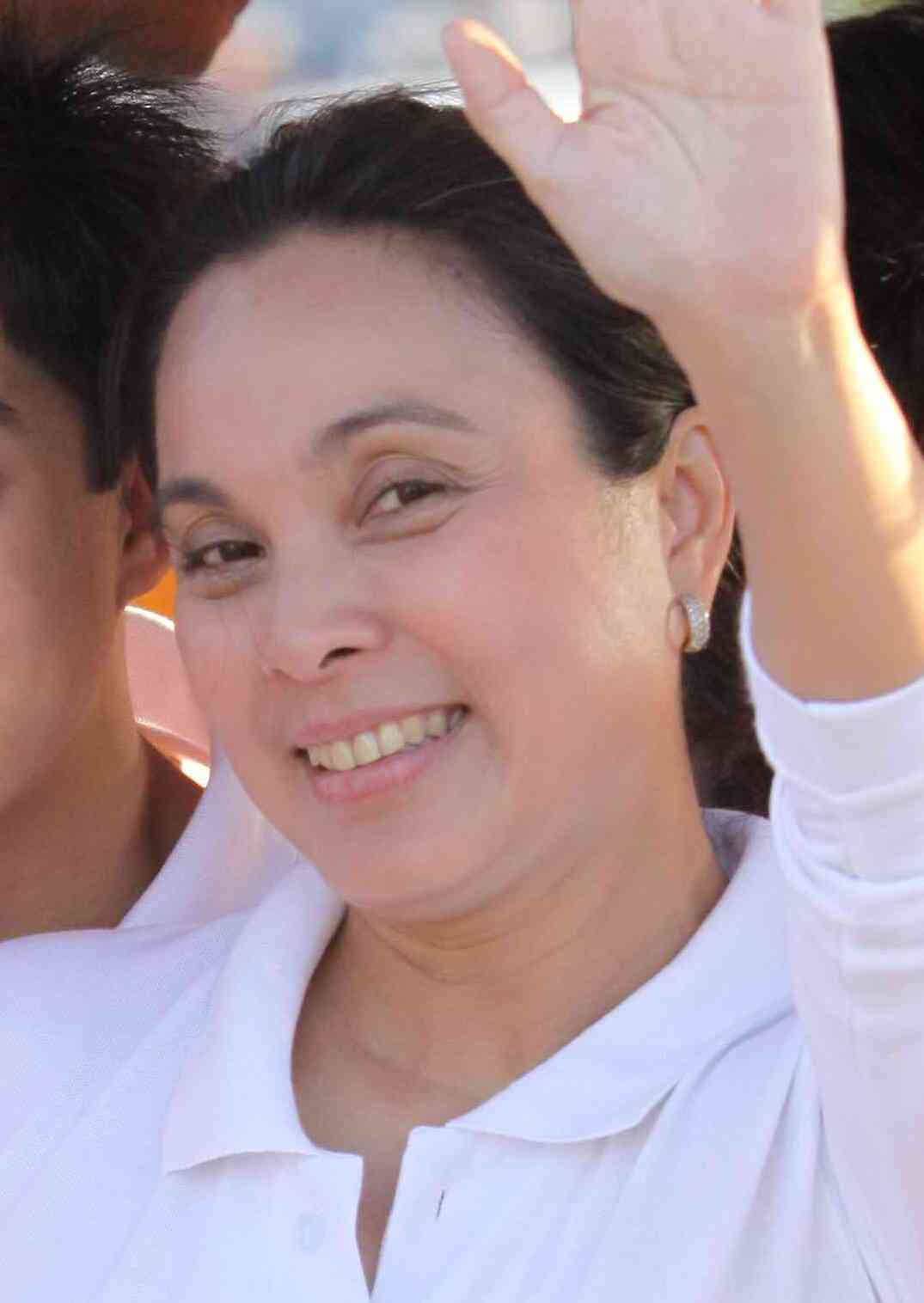
Candidate	Jejomar Binay	Mar Roxas	Loren Legarda
Party	PDP–Laban	Liberal	NPC
Popular vote	14,645,574	13,918,490	4,294,664
Percentage	41.65%	39.58%	12.21%
- Map showing the official results taken from provincial and city certificates of canvass. The inset shows Metro Manila.
Vice President before election
Noli de Castro
Independent
Elected Vice President
Jejomar Binay
PDP–Laban

Presidential elections in the Philippines were held on May 10, 2010. The incumbent President of the Philippines, Gloria Macapagal Arroyo, was ineligible to seek re-election as per the 1987 Constitution.

Incumbent Vice-President Noli de Castro was allowed to seek re-election, though he could have possibly sought the presidency. As he didn't offer himself in any manner of candidacy at the election, his successor was determined as the 13th Vice President of the Philippines. Although most presidential candidates have running mates, the president and vice president are elected separately, and the winning candidates may be of different political parties.

This election was also the first time that the Commission of Elections (COMELEC) implemented full automation of elections, pursuant to Republic Act 9369, "An Act Authorizing The Commission on Elections To Use An Automated Election System In The May 11, 1998 National or Local Elections and In Subsequent National And Local Electoral Exercises".

The results of the congressional canvassing showed that Senator Benigno Aquino III of the Liberal Party won by a plurality, although he had won with the highest percentage of votes since 1986, but not enough to have the largest margin of victory, even in elections held after 1986.

Meanwhile, in the election for the vice-presidency, Makati Mayor Jejomar Binay of the Partido Demokratiko Pilipino-Lakas ng Bayan (PDP-Laban) defeated Senator Mar Roxas of the Liberal Party in the third-narrowest margin in the history of vice presidential elections. Aquino and Binay were proclaimed in a joint session of Congress on June 9, and took their oaths on June 30, 2010. Roxas filed an electoral protest to the Presidential Electoral Tribunal (PET; the Supreme Court) on July 10, 2010.

Places where the presidential (red) and vice presidential (blue) candidates voted. For candidates that voted in Metro Manila (green), see map below.
Places where the presidential (red) and vice presidential (blue) candidates voted.

== Electoral system ==
The election is held every six years after 1992, on the second Monday of May. The incumbent president is term limited. The incumbent vice president may run for two consecutive terms. As Joseph Estrada, who was elected in 1998, was able to run in 2010, it is undetermined if the term limit is for life, or is only limited to the incumbent.

The plurality voting system is used to determine the winner: the candidate with the highest number of votes, whether or not one has a majority, wins the presidency. The vice presidential election is a separate election, is held on the same rules, and voters may split their ticket. Both winners will serve six-year terms commencing on the noon of June 30, 2010, and ending on the same day six years later.

The candidates are determined via political conventions of the different political parties. As most political parties in the Philippines are loosely structured, with most politicians switching parties from time to time, a person not nominated by a party may either run as an independent, get drafted by another party, or form their own party. The candidacy process is supervised by the Commission on Elections (usually referred by its abbreviation "COMELEC") which also regulates and holds the elections. It is not uncommon for the commission to disqualify certain candidates as "nuisance candidates" or those candidates who have no capacity to mount a nationwide campaign. This usually limits the candidates to a small number. The campaign will run for three months, beginning in early February 2010 and ending on the eve of the election. The Vote Counting Machines was tested and booted up at 5 am and the shading of candidates started at 7:30 am

The counting of votes is initially held in the individual voting precincts, which are all then tabulated for the different municipalities and cities, then to the provinces, and finally to Congress, which is the final canvasser of the votes. Election protests are handled by the Supreme Court, when it sits as the Presidential Electoral Tribunal.

== Timeline ==
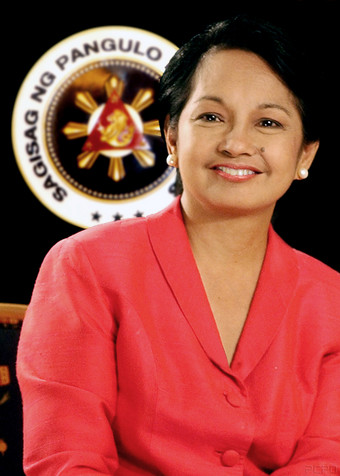
Gloria Macapagal Arroyo, the incumbent president, whose term expired at noon on June 30, 2010.

The COMELEC-mandated election period for this election was from January 10 to June 9

=== 2008 ===
- August 26 - Then-Metro Manila Development Authority Chairman Bayani Fernando announces bid for presidency.
- September 4 - Senator Manny Villar announces bid for presidency.
- November 11 - Makati Mayor Jejomar Binay announces bid for presidency.
- November 26 - Senator Mar Roxas is elected as party president of the Liberal Party and is nominated to be the standard-bearer.

=== 2009 ===
- March 12 - Former Defense Secretary Gilbert Teodoro Jr. announces bid for presidency.
- April 25 - Senator Richard Gordon announces bid for presidency.
- May 12 - Senator Panfilo Lacson announces bid for presidency.
- June 6 - Senator Lacson withdraws from presidential race.
- June 17 - Environmentalist Nicanor Perlas announces bid for presidency.
- July 14 - Senator Loren Legarda announces bid for presidency.
- July 31 - Senator Jamby Madrigal announces bid for presidency.
- August 1 - Former Philippine President Corazon Aquino dies from colorectal cancer. The country descends into a five-day period of mourning and grief for the late President.
- August 21 - Evangelist Eddie Villanueva announces bid for presidency.
- August 30 - Ang Kapatiran names Olongapo City councilor John Carlos de los Reyes as its standard-bearer.
- September 1 - Senator Roxas withdraws and supports fellow Senator Benigno Aquino III.; Jejomar Binay withdraws and supports Former President Joseph Estrada.
- September 4 - Pampanga Governor Ed Panlilio and Isabela Governor Grace Padaca withdraws and supports Aquino.
- September 9 - Senator Benigno Aquino III announces bid for presidency.
- September 21 - Liberal completes tandem: Roxas accepts vice presidential offer of Aquino.
- September 26 - Ousted President Joseph Estrada announces bid for presidency
- October 23 - Interior and Local Government Secretary Ronaldo Puno withdraws vice presidential bid.
- October 24 - Legarda slides to vice president.
- October 28 - Amid pressures to run for president, Senator Francis Joseph G. Escudero leaves NPC
- November 13 - Lakas–Kampi completes tandem: TV personality Edu Manzano runs for vice president with Teodoro.
- November 16 - Nacionalista Party completes tandem: Villar picks Legarda for Vice President.
- November 19 - Lakas–Kampi National Convention nominates Teodoro and Manzano.
- November 23 - De los Reyes and Dominador Chipeco, Jr. (Ang Kapatiran) file certificates of candidacy for president and VP, respectively.
- November 24 - Senator Escudero withdraws from the presidential race
- November 26 - Supreme Court allows "early campaigning".
- November 28 - Aquino and Roxas (Liberal) file Certificates of Candidacy.
- November 29 - Nicanor Perlas (Independent) files certificate of candidacy for president.
- November 30 - Villar and Legarda (Nacionalista) and; Estrada and Binay (PMP).; Villanueva and Perfecto Yasay, Jr. (Bangon Pilipinas) file Certificates of Candidacy for Pres and VP, respectively file certificates of candidacy. Hermogenes Ebdane withdraws presidential bid
- December 1–2 Teodoro and Manzano (Lakas–Kampi) file Certificates of Candidacy for President and Vce President, respectively. file; Jamby Madrigal (Independent) files for president alone; Gordon and Fernando (Bagumbayan); Jose Sonza (KBL) files for vice president.
- December 2 - ANC Presidential Forum: Analysts and viewers say Aquino gave "strong performance" and sounded "credible" (42%). Teodoro close second (37%); flip-flops on Reproductive Health Bill position. Villar was absent.
- December 11 - Outgoing Vice President Noli De Castro endorses Roxas for vice president.
- December 15 - Commission on Elections releases list of 16 approved candidates for president and vice-president.
- December 21 - Perlas protests disqualification at COMELEC.
- December 28 - COMELEC hears appeal and petition of disqualified candidates.
- December 21–22 - Pulse Asia Dec 2009 polls: Aquino solidifies lead in(45%) and BW-SWS (46%) presidential surveys. Legarda (37%) and Roxas (39%) are statistically tied in first place for the Pulse Asia vice-presidency survey.

=== 2010 ===
==== Election period ====
- January 10 - Social Weather Stations December 2009 Survey (Zamora commissioned): Villar (33%) cuts Aquino (44%) lead.
- January 14 - Perlas reinstated by COMELEC. Relatively unknown Vetellano Acosta (KBL) is also reinstated as a candidate.
- January 14 - GMA Network Vice-Presidential Forum.
- January 20 - Estrada is allowed to run after the COMELEC threw out all three disqualification cases against him.
- January 29 - De La Salle University and ANC 2010 Presidential Youth Forum Youth 2010: Audience members say Aquino, Gordon, Teodoro "made a favorable impression". Madrigal attends for the first time. Estrada absent.
- February 8 - The Inquirer 1st Edition Presidential Debate with all candidates attending except Acosta and Estrada, with the latter citing "bias" against him.
- February 9 - Official election campaign starts
- February 9 - Campaign kickoff rallies occur at Antipolo (Lakas–Kampi), Calamba (Nacionalista), Imus (Bagumbayan), Olongapo (Ang Kapatiran), Quiapo (PMP), Rizal Park (Bangon Pilipinas), and Tarlac (Liberal).
- March 4 - COMELEC disqualifies Vetellano Acosta. His name, however, would remain in the ballot although votes that would be cast for him will be considered invalid.
- March 21 - ABS-CBN and ANC Vice-Presidential Debate: Analysts and viewers say that Roxas is seen as "most credible candidate" (54%) with Binay, Fernando tie in second (13%) and Yasay (11%); Legarda fared poorly (4%). Absent was Chipeco and Manzano whose absence drew comments on social-networking sites. Analysts point out also not "to belittle" the underdogs and praised Binay, Yasay and Sonza.
- March 28 - A number of Lakas–Kampi stalwarts leave party to support Villar. The Liberals says these defections are "completing the Villarroyo [Villar-Arroyo] puzzle". Malacañang downplays defections and denies alliance with Villar.
- March 30 - Teodoro resigns as Lakas–Kampi Chairman to focus on campaign. This fuels further speculation that President Arroyo is dropping her financial support for her party in exchange of new support in Villar due to "winnability". Sarangani Governor and party president Miguel Dominguez and secretary-general Francis Manglapus follows in less than 24 hours. Malacañang denies speculations that the resignations have something to do with rumors that Pres. Arroyo has decided to support another presidential candidate.
- April 6 - Pulse Asia March 2010 survey: Villar (25%) falls 4 points as Aquino (37%) widens lead. According to Pulse Asia, this was mainly due to the Villarroyo issue. This came at the heels of talks that Villar is the "secret candidate" of Pres. Arroyo, a charge that he denies.
- April 10 – May 10 – Overseas absentee voting continuing until May 10 (Election day). Two polling precincts encountered technical problems in Hong Kong, raising concerns on the automation system.
- April 28–30 – Local absentee voting for government officials, teachers performing election duties outside of their precincts, members of the Armed Forces of the Philippines (AFP) and operatives of the Philippine National Police (PNP) starts.
- April 29 – COMELEC rejects proposals of a parallel manual count aside from the official tabulation.
- First Week of May - Smartmatic-TIM recalls the Compact Flash Cards (CFC) of all Precinct Count Optical Scanner (PCOS) Machines due to the machines not counting the votes correctly due to the spacing of the ballot. These were found out after testing. By Election Day, 99% of all CF Cards were already delivered. The remaining 1% was due to some inaccessible precincts.
- May 2 – Kingdom of Jesus Christ leader pastor Apollo Quiboloy finally endorses Gilbert Teodoro for president. and Mar Roxas for vice president
- May 3 - Manila Standard Today Presidential Survey: Aquino leads with Estrada overtaking Villar.
- May 5 - Iglesia ni Cristo endorses the tandem of Benigno Aquino III and Mar Roxas (Liberal). Voting as a block, the INC has an estimated command votes of 5 to 8 million.
- May 8 – The Supreme Court junks petitions to postpone the elections due to the technical difficulties found with the issue of the CF Cards
- May 10 — Election Day
- May 10 – COMELEC extends the voting hours until 7 pm.
- May 11 – After initial election results, De los Reyes, Gordon, Teodoro, Villar and Villanueva conceded defeat to Aquino in the presidential race while Estrada says he won't concede and will wait for the congressional canvass. Chipeco, Legarda, Manzano and Yasay conceded defeat in the vice presidential race.
- May 25 – Congress approves the rules for the canvassing of the Certificates of Canvass for the presidential and vice-presidential positions.
- May 26 – The National Board of Canvassers through the Joint Canvassing Committee composed of evenly of both the Senate and the House of Representatives convene.
- May 28 – Canvassing finally starts with the first certificate of canvass (COC) from Laos to be opened.
- May 31 – June 4 - The issue of null votes i.e. overvotes, undervotes, abstentions, were raised by the Aquino-Roxas Bantay Balota (Aquino and Roxas Ballot Watch). COMELEC, however, stated that the rule on null votes is equivalent on the rule on stray votes before automation, thus the rules on stray or null votes would apply even if votes were manually counted in an electoral protest.
- June 4 - Several municipalities which declared failure of Elections on May 10 hold rescheduled elections. These were mostly in Lanao del Sur.
- June 8 – Canvassing ends with Aquino (15,208,678) and Binay (14,645,574) winning the presidential and vice presidential elections.
- June 9 – In a speedy deliberation in a public session, the Congress approves the report of the Joint Committee officially proclaiming Aquino and Binay the winners. Through a speech read by his son Senator Jinggoy Estrada, Estrada concedes and promises to support Aquino.
- June 9 - Congress proclaims Senator Benigno Aquino III as president-elect and Makati Mayor Jejomar Binay as vice president-elect of the Republic of the Philippines.

==== Post-election period ====
- June 30 - Aquino and Binay inaugurated as president and vice president of the Philippines.
- July 10 – Roxas files an electoral protest against Binay at the Presidential Electoral Tribunal (PET). Binay's camp shrugged off the protest and says that tribunal will "uphold his victory".
- July 12 – The Presidential Electoral Tribunal (PET) declares the electoral protest of Roxas "sufficient in form and substance". The PET issues summons to Binay to respond to the protest within ten days.

== Candidates ==
In the Philippines, the multi-party system is implemented. Sometimes a coalition of different parties are made. Notable this year is the Pwersa ng Masang Pilipino–PDP–Laban and Nacionalista–NPC coalitions. Each party hosts candidates who go through a process to determine the presidential nominee for that party.

The Commission on Elections released its list of 16 approved candidates for president and vice-president on December 15. One disqualified candidate, Perlas, was reinstated.

This is arranged by the presidential candidates' surname.

Presidential candidate			Vice presidential candidate			Campaign
Image	Candidate name and party	Most recent political position	Image	Candidate name and party	Most recent political position	Campaign
	Benigno Aquino III; Liberal	Senator (Incumbent since 2007)		Mar Roxas; Liberal	Senator (Incumbent since 2004)	(Campaign)
	John Carlos de los Reyes; Ang Kapatiran	Member of the Olongapo City Council (Incumbent since 2007; 1995–1998)		Dominador Chipeco Jr. Ang Kapatiran	none	
	Joseph Estrada; PMP	Former President (1998 – 2001)		Jejomar Binay; PDP–Laban	Mayor of Makati (Incumbent since 2001)	(Campaign)
	Dick Gordon; Bagumbayan–VNP	Senator (Incumbent since 2004)		Bayani Fernando; Bagumbayan–VNP	Chairperson of the Metropolitan Manila Development Authority (2002 – 2009)	
	Jamby Madrigal; Independent	Senator (Incumbent since 2004)	none			
	Nicanor Perlas; Independent	none	none			
	Gilberto Teodoro; Lakas–Kampi	Secretary of National Defense (2004 – 2010)		Edu Manzano; Lakas–Kampi	Chairman of the Optical Media Board (2004 – 2009)	(Campaign)
	Eddie Villanueva; Bangon Pilipinas	none		Perfecto Yasay Jr. Bangon Pilipinas	Chairperson of the Securities and Exchange Commission (1995 – 2000)	
	Manny Villar; Nacionalista	Senate President (2006 – 2008)		Loren Legarda; NPC	Senator (Incumbent since 2007)	(Campaign)
none (Note: Vetellano Acosta, Jay Sonza's running mate, was disqualified.)				Jay Sonza; KBL	none	

== Opinion polls ==
The Philippines has two primary opinion polling companies: Social Weather Stations (SWS) and Pulse Asia.

=== For president ===
Plotted as a 3-period moving average of the surveys.

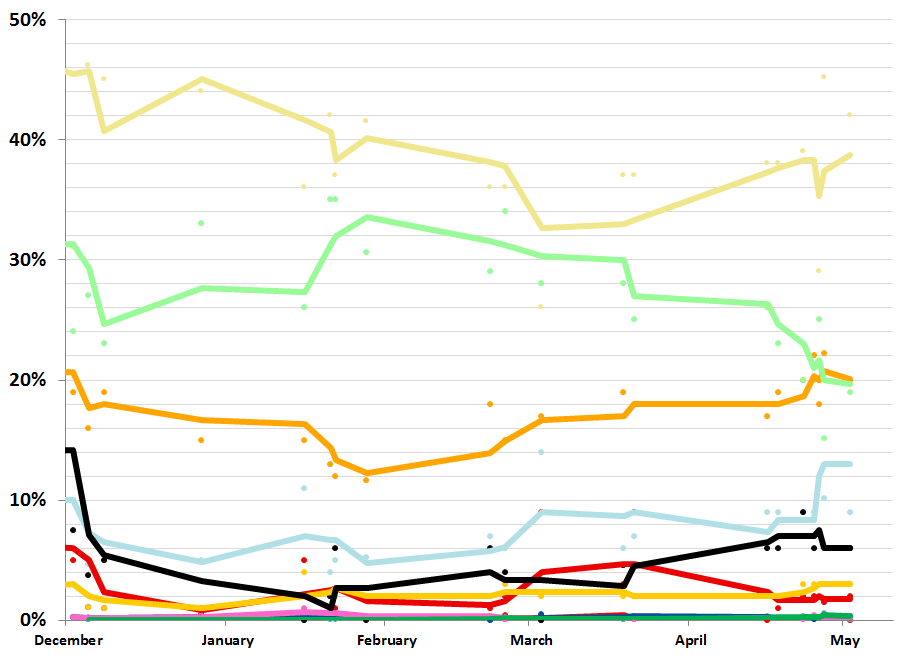

=== For vice president ===
Plotted as a 3-period moving average of the surveys.

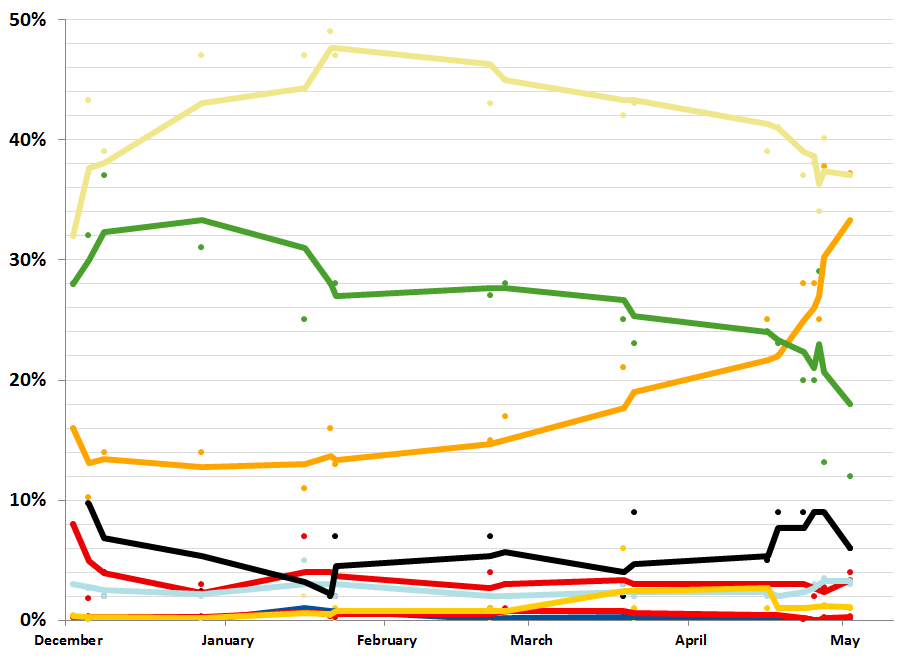

=== Exit poll ===
SWS conducted an exit poll. SWS's 2004 exit poll missed by a large margin the result.

According to the SWS exit poll, 45% of Muslims voted for Binay, while only 17% chose Roxas and 28% for Legarda. About 75% of the members of the Iglesia ni Cristo voted for Roxas. Despite having the endorsement of several Catholic bishops, de los Reyes only got 0.2% of the Catholic vote, while Aquino, despite being branded by some Catholic organizations as not pro-life, got 44%.

==== President ====
Poll source	Date(s) conducted	Sample size	Margin of error	Aquino	De los Reyes	Estrada	Gordon	Madrigal	Perlas	Teodoro	Villanueva	Villar
SWS	May 10	52,573	±1%	43.34	0.15	26.38	1.40	0.23	0.13	10.25	3.40	14.73

==== Vice President ====
Poll source	Date(s) conducted	Sample size	Margin of error	Binay	Chipeco	Fernando	Legarda	Manzano	Roxas	Sonza	Yasay
SWS	May 10	52,573	±1%	42.52	0.43	2.92	11.51	1.81	39.17	0.20	1.43

== Results ==
The candidate in each position with the highest number of votes is declared the winner; there is no runoff. Congress shall canvass the votes in joint public session.

When there are two or more candidates who have the highest and an equal number of votes, Congress, voting separately via majority vote will choose from these candidates, who have the highest and equal number of votes, who is to be the president.

The Supreme Court shall "be the sole judge of all contests relating to the election, returns, and qualifications of the President or Vice President".

There are several parallel tallies, with the congressional canvass the official tally. The COMELEC used the election returns from the polling precincts; the Congress as the national board of canvassers will base their official tally from the certificates of canvass from the provinces and cities, which were derived from the election returns. The accredited citizen's arm, the Parish Pastoral Council for Responsible Voting (PPCRV) also used the election returns from the polling precincts. In theory, all tallies must be identical.

=== For president ===
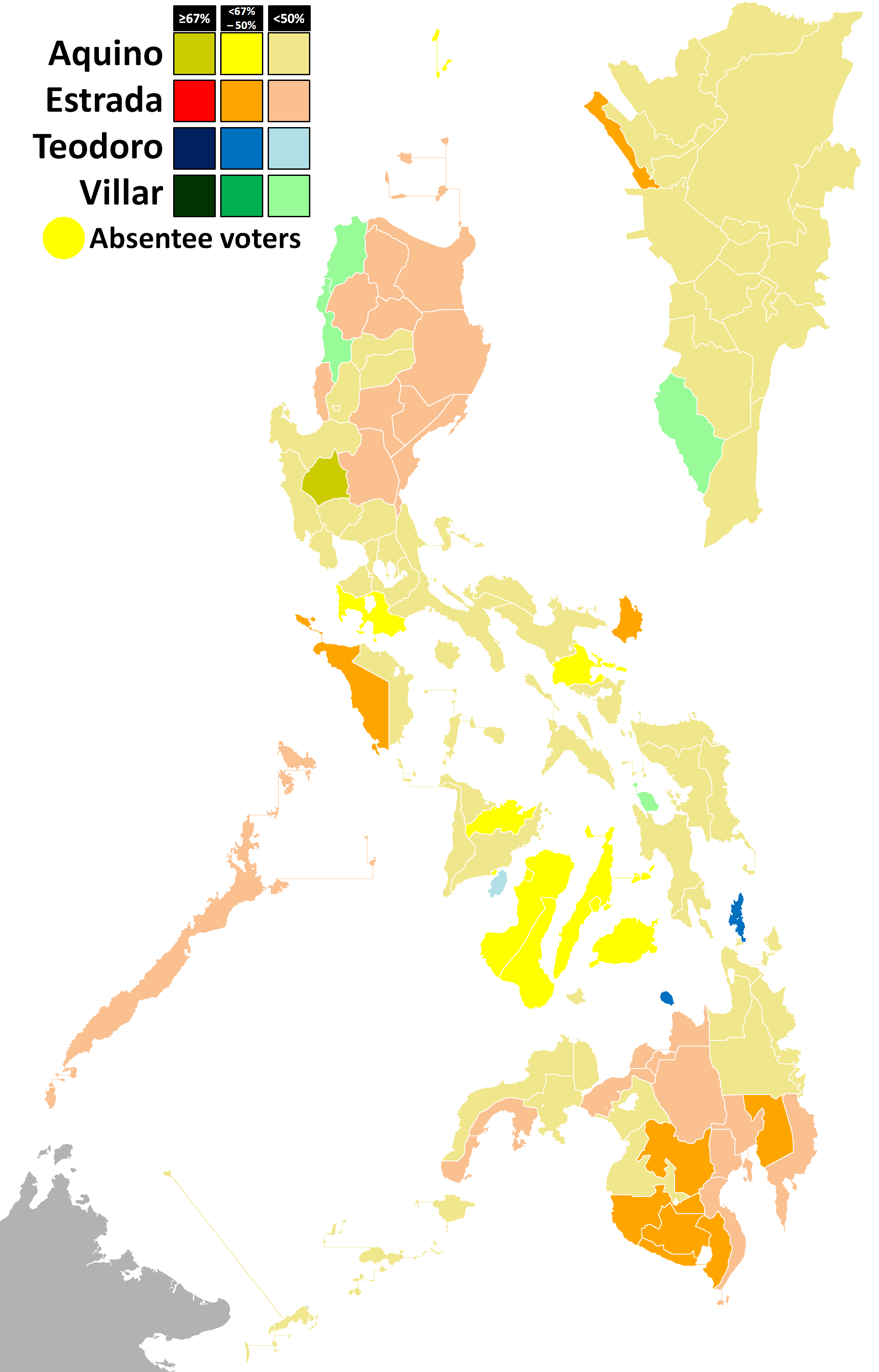
Presidential election results per province and city.

Congress in joint session as the National Board of Canvassers convened in the Batasang Pambansa Complex in Quezon City, the home of the House of Representatives. Only a committee canvassed the votes, with the same number of members from both the Senate and the House of Representatives.

On June 8, Congress finished canvassing all of the votes, with the final canvass showing that Aquino and Binay had won. Aquino and Binay were proclaimed as president-elect and vice president-elect in a joint session on June 9. The president-elect and vice president-elect were inaugurated on June 30, 2010. Aquino, son of the 11th president Corazon Aquino, became the second child of a former president to become president themselves after his immediate predecessor Gloria Macapagal Arroyo, whose father was the 9th president Diosdado Macapagal.

In case a president has not been determined by June 30, the vice president-elect shall act as president until a president has been determined. If both positions have not yet been determined, the President of the Senate, or the Speaker of the House of Representatives if the former is unable to do so, shall act as president. Congress shall enact a law on who acts as president if neither of the officials already stated are unable to do so.

Candidate	Party	Votes	%
Benigno Aquino III	Liberal Party	15,208,678	42.08
Joseph Estrada	Pwersa ng Masang Pilipino	9,487,837	26.25
Manny Villar	Nacionalista Party	5,573,835	15.42
Gilbert Teodoro	Lakas–Kampi–CMD	4,095,839	11.33
Eddie Villanueva	Bangon Pilipinas	1,125,878	3.12
Dick Gordon	Bagumbayan–VNP	501,727	1.39
Nicanor Perlas	Independent	54,575	0.15
Jamby Madrigal	Independent	46,489	0.13
John Carlos de los Reyes	Ang Kapatiran	44,244	0.12
Total		36,139,102	100.00
Valid votes		36,139,102	94.73
Invalid/blank votes (Note: Includes 181,985 votes for Vetellano Acosta (Kilusang Bagong Lipunan) who was disqualified after the ballots were printed.)		2,010,269	5.27
Total votes		38,149,371	100.00
Registered voters/turnout		51,317,073	74.34
Source: COMELEC

Popular vote
Aquino	42.08%
Estrada	26.25%
Villar	15.42%
Teodoro	11.33%
Others	4.91%

==== By region ====
Region	Aquino		Estrada		Villar		Teodoro		Villanueva		Gordon		Perlas		Madrigal		de los Reyes	
Region	Votes	%	Votes	%	Votes	%	Votes	%	Votes	%	Votes	%	Votes	%	Votes	%	Votes	%
Ilocos Region	714,120	32.56	481,263	21.94	665,290	30.34	231,785	10.57	71,611	3.27	21,304	0.97	1,995	0.09	3,674	0.17	1,970	0.09
Cordillera Administrative Region	188,354	29.14	150,363	23.27	125,373	19.40	126,215	19.53	43,028	6.66	9,267	1.43	1,372	0.21	1,418	0.22	905	0.14
Cagayan Valley	375,851	28.95	486,244	37.46	265,475	20.45	114,155	8.79	43,001	3.31	8,867	0.68	1,718	0.13	1,552	0.12	1,319	0.11
Central Luzon	1,812,958	43.29	1,069,923	25.55	515,775	12.32	505,045	12.06	158,974	3.80	112,960	2.70	3,593	0.08	4,281	0.10	4,010	0.10
National Capital Region	1,882,188	45.08	1,170,772	28.04	381,122	9.13	436,141	10.44	139,232	3.34	148,070	3.54	6,480	0.16	5,965	0.14	5,285	0.13
Calabarzon	2,274,684	47.57	1,442,722	30.17	415,630	8.69	356,952	7.47	183,190	3.83	91,485	1.91	5,773	0.12	6,360	0.13	5,164	0.11
Mimaropa	407,309	38.97	371,799	35.57	153,067	14.64	49,874	4.77	52,420	5.01	6,351	0.61	1,627	0.16	1,285	0.12	1,517	0.15
Bicol Region	1,049,766	48.84	487,467	22.68	347,029	16.15	188,171	8.75	50,415	2.35	15,517	0.72	3,381	0.15	4,182	0.20	3,523	0.16
Western Visayas	1,524,571	52.57	287,038	9.90	661,077	22.80	334,673	11.54	61,418	2.12	16,977	0.59	6,211	0.21	3,712	0.13	4,216	0.14
Central Visayas	1,575,389	54.91	177,101	6.17	449,199	15.66	581,806	20.28	52,998	1.85	17,703	0.62	6,216	0.22	3,555	0.11	5,184	0.18
Eastern Visayas	693,987	40.18	427,689	24.76	327,623	18.97	212,439	12.30	45,583	2.64	10,922	0.63	3,605	0.21	2,695	0.15	2,699	0.16
Zamboanga Peninsula	430,448	36.88	370,835	31.77	234,221	20.07	97,925	8.39	24,985	2.14	3,965	0.34	2,251	0.19	1,078	0.10	1,389	0.12
Northern Mindanao	551,868	32.30	621,467	36.37	231,218	13.53	247,867	14.51	41,128	2.41	7,871	0.46	3,041	0.18	1,592	0.09	2,510	0.15
Davao Region	501,263	29.38	815,308	47.78	160,107	9.38	172,199	10.09	44,571	2.61	7,539	0.44	2,262	0.13	1,417	0.08	1,623	0.11
Soccsksargen	306,646	23.27	791,130	60.05	113,060	8.58	67,978	5.15	31,443	2.39	3,983	0.30	1,689	0.13	893	0.07	718	0.06
Caraga	371,665	36.74	194,002	19.18	168,581	16.66	218,583	21.61	49,726	4.92	4,701	0.47	2,006	0.20	1,205	0.12	1,180	0.10
ARMM	461,314	42.48	126,407	11.64	341,631	31.46	133,877	12.33	12,434	1.15	7,143	0.65	1,126	0.10	1,369	0.12	791	0.07

=== For vice president ===
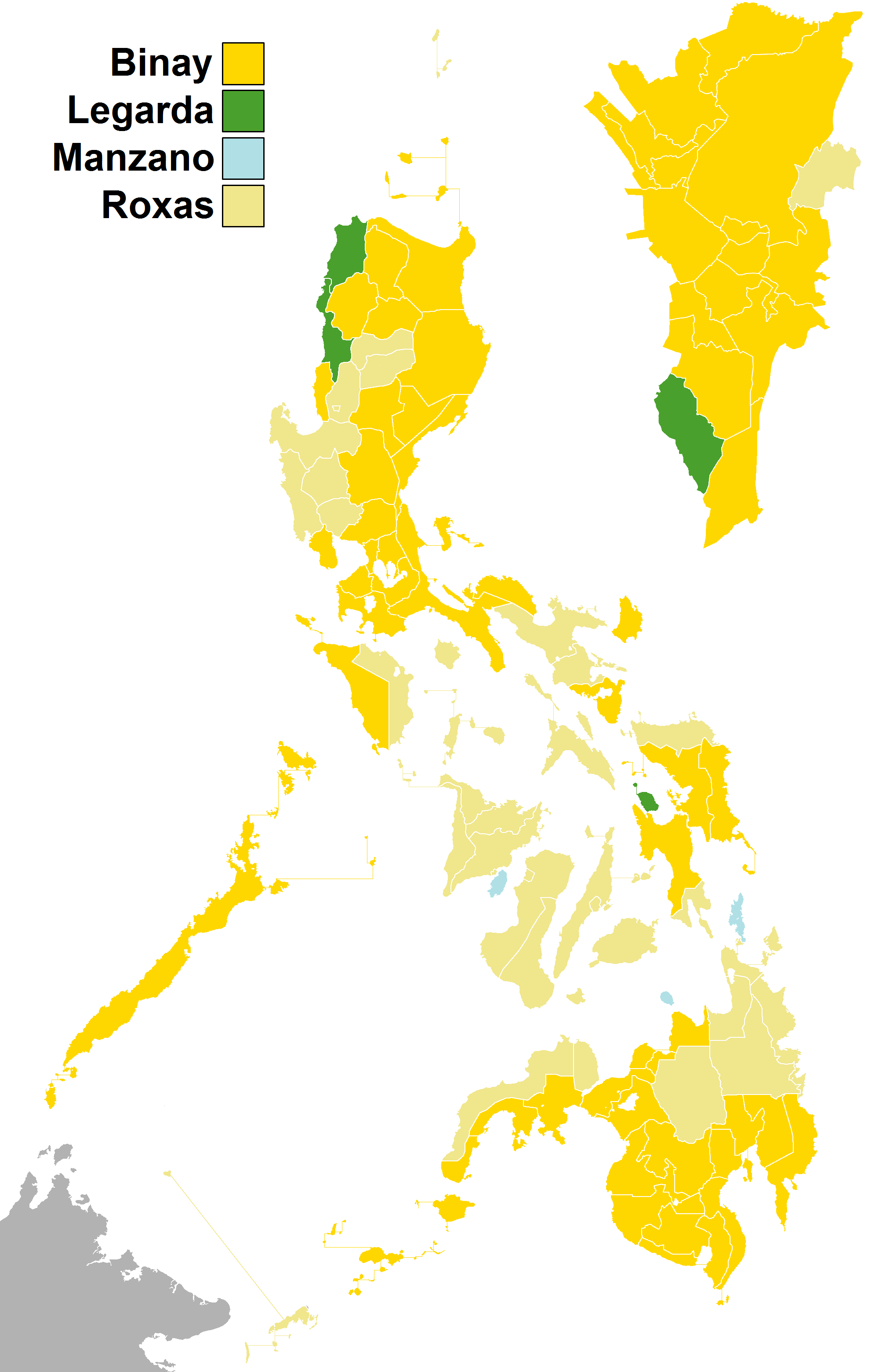
Vice presidential election results per province and city. Loren Legarda and Bayani Fernando, despite having more votes than Edu Manzano, failed to win in any province or city where COCs had been canvassed by Congress.

The candidate with the highest number of votes wins the vice presidency. In case when two or more candidates have the highest number of votes, one of them shall be chosen by the vote of a majority of all the members of both Houses of the Congress, voting separately.

Candidate	Party	Votes	%
Jejomar Binay (Note: Running mate of Joseph Estrada (Pwersa ng Masang Pilipino))	PDP–Laban	14,645,574	41.65
Mar Roxas	Liberal Party	13,918,490	39.58
Loren Legarda (Note: Running mate of Manny Villar (Nacionalista Party))	Nationalist People's Coalition	4,294,664	12.21
Bayani Fernando	Bagumbayan–VNP	1,017,631	2.89
Edu Manzano	Lakas–Kampi–CMD	807,728	2.30
Perfecto Yasay Jr.	Bangon Pilipinas	364,652	1.04
Jay Sonza (Note: Running mate of Vetellano Acosta (Kilusang Bagong Lipunan) who was disqualified)	Kilusang Bagong Lipunan	64,230	0.18
Dominador Chipeco Jr.	Ang Kapatiran	52,562	0.15
Total		35,165,531	100.00
Valid votes		35,165,531	92.18
Invalid/blank votes		2,983,840	7.82
Total votes		38,149,371	–
Registered voters/turnout		51,317,073	74.34
Source: COMELEC

Popular vote
Binay	41.65%
Roxas	39.58%
Legarda	12.21%
Others	6.56%

==== By region ====
Region	Binay		Roxas		Legarda		Fernando		Manzano		Yasay		Sonza		Chipeco	
Region	Votes	%	Votes	%	Votes	%	Votes	%	Votes	%	Votes	%	Votes	%	Votes	%
Ilocos Region	812,386	37.76	758,863	35.27	485,821	22.58	49,922	2.32	23,350	1.09	16,444	0.76	2,598	0.12	2,083	0.10
Cordillera Administrative Region	230,159	36.83	211,930	33.92	133,719	21.40	21,094	3.38	13,753	2.20	12,270	1.96	1,081	0.17	852	0.14
Cagayan Valley	683,359	53.68	337,018	26.48	205,333	16.13	22,857	1.80	12,136	0.95	8,709	0.68	1,471	0.12	2,042	0.16
Central Luzon	1,702,473	41.32	1,666,679	40.45	464,009	11.26	169,045	4.10	59,666	1.45	45,583	1.11	9,585	0.23	3,379	0.08
National Capital Region	2,150,806	51.62	1,476,192	35.43	187,979	4.51	254,019	6.10	35,239	0.85	50,184	1.20	9,210	0.22	2,860	0.07
Calabarzon	2,455,951	51.89	1,686,331	35.63	328,983	6.95	151,775	3.21	39,310	0.83	55,353	1.17	8,417	0.18	6,548	0.14
Mimaropa	375,338	37.06	369,350	36.46	205,133	20.25	28,181	2.78	19,137	1.89	12,714	1.26	1,564	0.15	1,481	0.15
Bicol Region	869,160	42.03	811,999	39.26	262,741	12.70	51,077	2.47	47,685	2.31	16,851	0.82	3,787	0.18	4,802	0.23
Western Visayas	566,181	20.08	1,808,541	64.13	305,495	10.83	52,357	1.86	54,475	1.93	22,569	0.80	5,464	0.19	5,174	0.18
Central Visayas	704,523	25.57	1,595,165	57.89	266,850	9.69	45,217	1.64	109,162	3.96	23,256	0.84	5,283	0.19	5,966	0.22
Eastern Visayas	655,360	41.00	591,243	36.98	218,123	13.64	30,028	1.88	80,740	5.05	16,337	1.02	2,923	0.18	3,879	0.25
Zamboanga Peninsula	526,162	48.06	378,429	34.57	125,045	11.42	17,311	1.58	35,786	3.27	7,360	0.67	1,726	0.16	2,905	0.27
Northern Mindanao	643,423	39.28	593,417	36.22	274,661	16.77	28,382	1.73	75,746	4.62	16,621	1.01	3,028	0.19	2,910	0.18
Davao Region	845,958	50.77	576,205	34.59	156,137	9.37	28,891	1.73	35,768	2.15	17,846	1.07	2,810	0.17	2,445	0.15
Soccsksargen	611,724	47.60	408,656	31.80	190,652	14.84	23,365	1.82	37,699	2.93	9,740	0.76	1,533	0.12	1,553	0.13
Caraga	306,778	31.77	389,764	40.36	135,683	14.05	19,523	2.02	93,729	9.71	16,492	1.71	1,715	0.18	1,949	0.20
ARMM	474,309	46.32	170,272	16.63	328,813	32.11	13,943	1.36	31,045	3.03	2,866	0.28	1,250	0.12	1,488	0.15

=== Close provinces/cities ===
Results of provincial canvasses for the presidential election
Aquino	Estrada
Villar	Teodoro
Results of provincial canvasses for the vice presidential election
Binay	Roxas
Legarda	

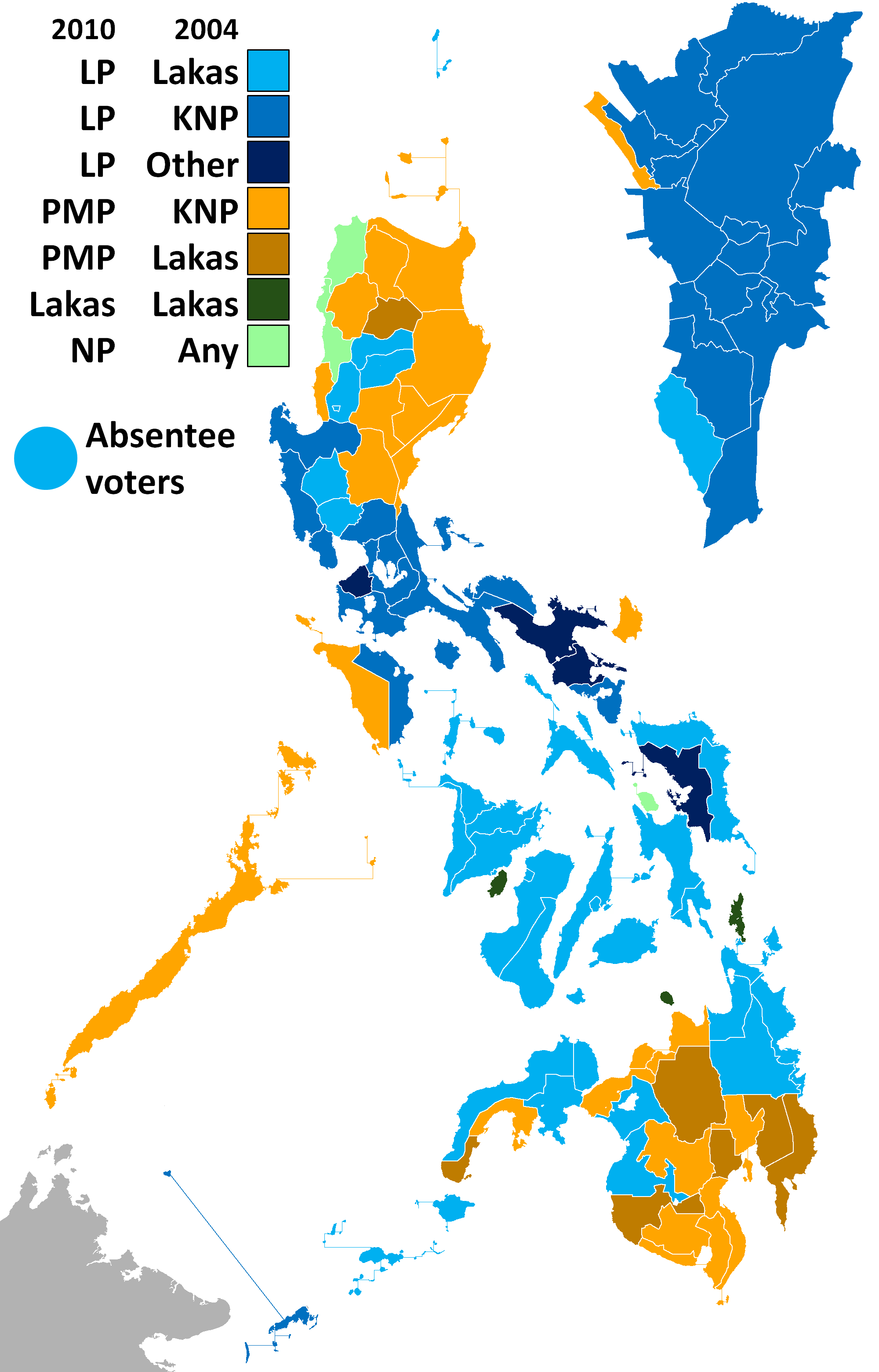
Swing as compared from the 2004 election: In 2004 the Liberals didn't field a candidate and instead supported Lakas-CMD's candidate Gloria Macapagal Arroyo as part of the K-4 coalition. 76% of the provinces and cities that Arroyo won went for Aquino. PMP's nominee in 2004, Poe, was the nominee of the KNP and retained 20 provinces and cities, and picked up six more provinces and cities, all but one in Mindanao.

Margin of victory is less than 5% for the presidential election:

- Guimaras: 0.08% (Lakas win)
- Nueva Vizcaya: 1.20% (PMP win)
- San Juan: 1.53% (Liberal win)
- Abra: 1.99% (PMP win)
- Sulu: 3.33% (Liberal win)
- Palawan: 3.35% (PMP win)
- Cagayan: 3.78% (PMP win)
- Agusan del Sur: 4.85% (Liberal win)

Margin of victory is less than 5% for the vice presidential election:

- Ilocos Sur: 0.48% (Liberal win)
- Absentee voters: 0.64% (Liberal win)
- Marinduque: 2.07% (Liberal win)
- Palawan: 2:30% (PDP-Laban)
- South Cotabato: 3.36% (PDP-Laban win)
- Zamboanga del Norte: 3.82% (Liberal win)
- Albay: 4.07% (Liberal win)
- Agusan del Norte: 4.44% (Liberal win)
- Quezon: 4.54% (PDP-Laban win)
- Zamboanga City: 4.62% (PDP-Laban win)
- Camarines Norte: 4.72% (PDP-Laban win)

=== Unofficial tallies ===
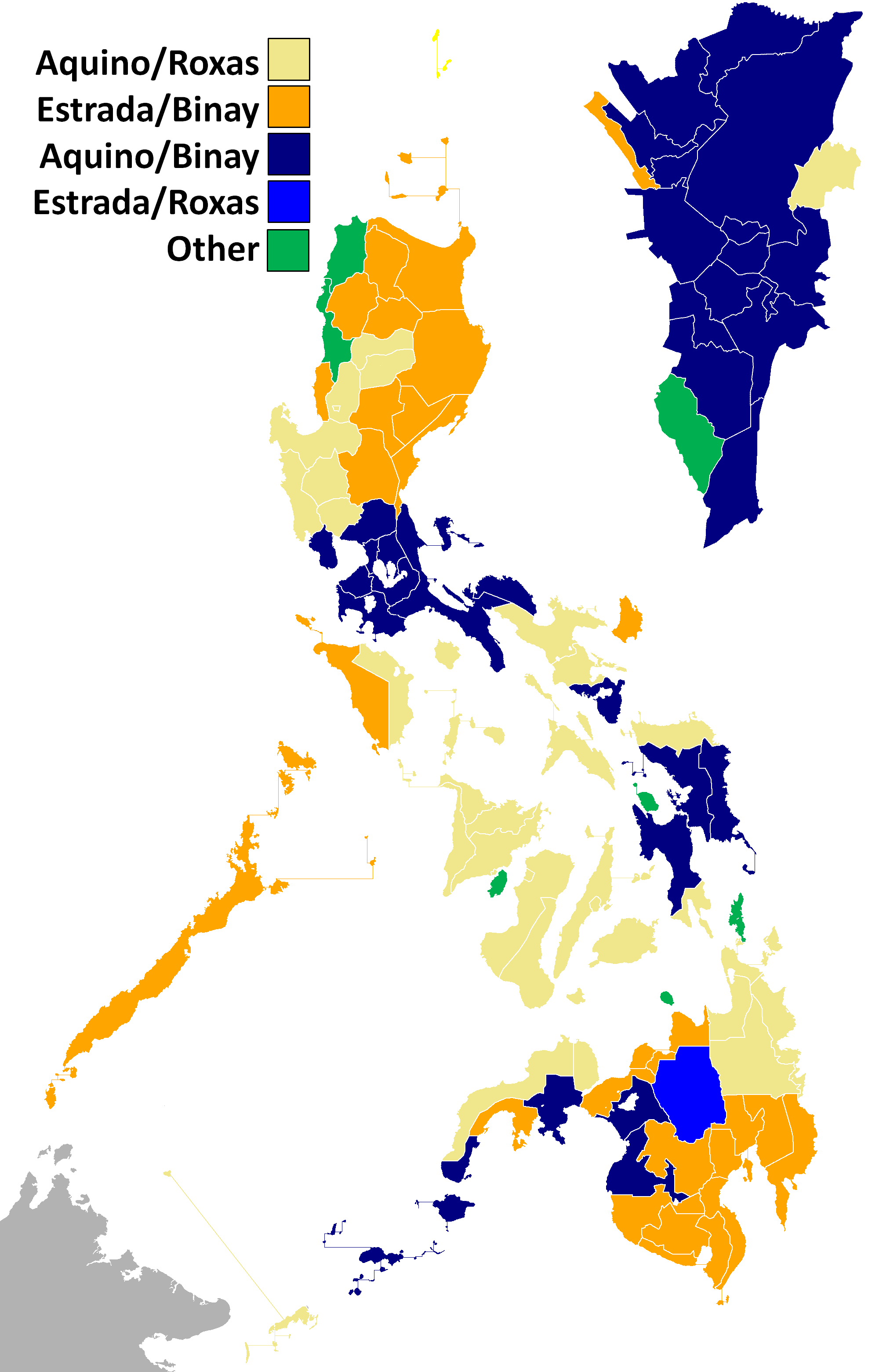
Winning presidential and vice presidential candidates per province/city in the elections. Note that the two positions are voted separately and voters can split their votes.

==== COMELEC ====
The COMELEC originally released results for president and vice president based from election returns but stopped in order not to preempt Congress. The COMELEC held their tally at the Philippine International Convention Center in Pasay.

2010 Philippine presidential election, COMELEC tally
Candidate	Party	Results	
Candidate	Party	Votes	%
Benigno Aquino III	Liberal	12,233,002	42.16%
Joseph Estrada	PMP	7,749,597	26.71%
Manuel Villar	Nacionalista	4,329,215	14.92%
Gilbert Teodoro	Lakas–Kampi	3,243,688	11.18%
Eddie Villanueva	Bangon Pilipinas	916,543	3.16%
Richard J. Gordon	Bagumbayan-VNP	431,954	1.49%
Nicanor Perlas	Independent	42,205	0.15%
Jamby Madrigal	Independent	37,119	0.13%
John Carlos de los Reyes	Ang Kapatiran	34,833	0.12%
Total valid votes cast		29,018,156	56.57%
Registered voters		51,292,465	100.00%
Clustered precincts reporting		59,965	78.41%

2010 Philippine vice presidential election, COMELEC tally
Candidate	Party	Results	
Candidate	Party	Votes	%
Jejomar Binay	PDP–Laban	12,025,429	42.45%
Mar Roxas	Liberal	11,213,563	39.59%
Loren Legarda	NPC	3,808,944	11.51%
Bayani Fernando	Bagumbayan-VNP	847,100	2.99%
Edu Manzano	Lakas–Kampi	593,653	2.10%
Perfecto Yasay	Bangon Pilipinas	295,558	1.04%
Jay Sonza	KBL	50,722	0.18%
Dominador Chipeco Jr.	Ang Kapatiran	40,335	0.14%
Total valid votes cast		28,326,323	55.23%
Registered voters		51,292,465	55.84%
Clustered precincts reporting		59,965	78.41%

==== PPCRV ====
The PPCRV held their tally at the Pope Pius Center in Manila.

2010 Philippine presidential election, PPCRV-KBP count
Candidate	Party	Results	
Candidate	Party	Votes	%
Noynoy Aquino	Liberal	14,012,761	42.10%
Joseph Estrada	PMP	8,860,076	26.62%
Manuel Villar	Nacionalista	5,073,824	15.24%
Gilbert Teodoro	Lakas Kampi CMD	3,709,681	11.14%
Eddie Villanueva	Bangon Pilipinas	1,029,406	3.09%
Richard J. Gordon	Bagumbayan-VNP	470,131	1.41%
Nicanor Perlas	Independent	49,362	0.15%
Jamby Madrigal	Independent	42,657	0.13%
John Carlos de los Reyes	Ang Kapatiran	40,430	0.12%
Total valid votes cast		33,288,328	64.90%
Registered voters		51,292,465	100.00%
Clustered precincts reporting		69,001	90.23%

2010 Philippine vice presidential election, PPCRV-KBP count
Candidate	Party	Results	
Candidate	Party	Votes	%
Jejomar Binay	PDP-Laban	13,653,873	42.11%
Mar Roxas	Liberal	12,823,404	39.55%
Loren Legarda	NPC	3,856,989	11.89%
Bayani Fernando	Bagumbayan-VNP	944,584	2.91%
Edu Manzano	Lakas Kampi CMD	712,996	2.20%
Perfecto Yasay	Bangon Pilipinas	327,501	1.01%
Jay Sonza	KBL	58,202	0.18%
Dominador Chipeco Jr.	Ang Kapatiran	47,799	0.15%
Total valid votes cast		32,455,348	63.28%
Registered voters		51,292,465	100.00%
Clustered precincts reporting		69,001	90.23%

== Voter demographics ==
=== President ===
2010 presidential vote by demographic subgroup
Demographic subgroup	Aquino	Estrada	Villar	Other	% of total vote
Total vote	41	29	16	14	100
Location
NCR	43	31	10	16	10
Balance Luzon	43	31	16	10	44
Visayas	53	10	19	18	20
Mindanao	33	40	16	11	27
Community
Urban	44	28	13	15	44
Rural	39	30	18	13	56
Socio-economic class
ABC	52	17	13	18	8
D	43	27	15	15	60
E	35	35	18	12	32
Gender
Male	39	32	15	14	46
Female	43	27	17	13	54
Age
18-24	37	30	18	15	12
25-34	40	30	17	13	24
35-44	41	30	16	13	23
45-54	42	29	15	14	20
55-64	45	26	16	13	12
65 & up	43	28	14	16	9
Education
Some elementary/elementary graduate	38	32	18	12	30
Some high school	35	36	18	11	14
High school graduate	41	31	16	12	25
Vocational	45	29	13	13	6
Some college	45	24	14	17	12
College graduate/post-college graduate	50	15	13	22	12
Working status
Employed	41	29	15	15	56
Unemployed	41	29	17	13	44
Religion
Roman Catholic	41	31	16	12	80
Islam	48	12	30	10	5
Iglesia ni Cristo	85	10	1	4	4
Aglipayan	38	27	22	13	1
Others	24	34	16	26	10
Ethnic groups
Tagalog	43	34	11	12	35
Cebuano	39	31	14	16	26
Ilocano	28	33	26	13	8
Ilonggo	48	20	17	15	8

Source: Exit polls conducted by Pulse Asia

=== Vice President ===
2010 vice presidential vote by demographic subgroup
Demographic subgroup	Binay	Roxas	Legarda	Other	% of total vote
Total vote	43	37	14	6	100
Location
NCR	54	33	5	8	10
Balance Luzon	46	34	15	5	44
Visayas	25	55	13	7	20
Mindanao	47	31	15	7	27
Community
Urban	48	38	9	5	47
Rural	39	37	17	7	56
Socio-economic class
ABC	41	45	7	7	8
D	43	39	12	6	60
E	42	33	18	7	32
Gender
Male	45	36	13	6	46
Female	41	39	14	6	54
Age
18-24	46	33	15	6	12
25-34	45	34	16	6	24
35-44	44	37	14	6	23
45-54	44	40	11	5	20
55-64	38	43	12	7	12
65 & up	33	45	14	8	9
Education
Some elementary/elementary graduate	38	35	19	8	30
Some high school	43	35	16	6	14
High school graduate	45	38	12	5	25
Vocational	50	40	7	3	6
Some college	46	39	11	4	12
College graduate/post-college graduate	42	43	7	8	12
Working status
Employed	43	37	14	6	56
Unemployed	42	38	14	6	44
Religion
Roman Catholic	45	37	13	5	80
Islam	40	19	36	5	5
Iglesia ni Cristo	9	86	3	2	4
Aglipayan	29	44	19	8	1
Others	44	30	15	11	10
Ethnic groups
Tagalog	52	34	9	5	35
Cebuano	41	41	11	7	26
Ilocano	41	30	24	5	8
Ilonggo	29	56	9	6	8

Source: Exit polls conducted by Pulse Asia

== Campaign expenses ==
According to the Fair Elections Act, the COMELEC's cap on spending is 10 pesos per voter for each candidate and another 5 pesos per voter for one's political party; since there are about 50 million voters, a candidate can spend up to 500 million pesos and a party can spend an additional 250 million pesos.

The following is a list of published campaign expenses; the COMELEC has no ability to confirm if these were true.

Candidate (Party)	Amount raised (PHP)	Amount spent (PHP)	Votes	Spent per vote (PHP)	Spent per voter (PHP)
Benigno Aquino III (Liberal)	440,050,000 (approx.)	403,119,981.81	15,208,678	26.51	7.86
Joseph Estrada (PMP)	8,000,000 (approx.)	227,500,000	9,487,837	23.98	4.44
Manny Villar (Nacionalista)	431,557,816	431,557,816	5,573,835	77.43	8.41
Gilbert Teodoro (Lakas–Kampi)	64,688.88	3,463,307.21	4,095,839	0.85	0.07
Jamby Madrigal (IND)	55,182,264	55,182,264	46,489	1,187.00	1.08
Jejomar Binay (PDP–Laban)	231,480,000 (approx.)	217,938,289	14,645,574	14.88	4.25
Mar Roxas (Liberal)	246,000,000 (approx.)	279,351,224	13,918,490	20.07	5.45
Loren Legarda (NPC)	N/A	210,280,000	4,294,664	48.96	4.10
Bayani Fernando (Bagumbayan)	61,000,000 (approx.)	80,081,865.61	1,017,631	78.69	1.56

== See also ==
- Naging Mahirap, Manuel Villar's campaign jingle

== Literature ==
- Reyes, Vicente (2013), "The impact of automation on elections: Case study of the May 2010 Philippine presidential contests", Journal of Developing Societies, 29 (3): 259–285, doi:10.1177/0169796X13494276
