= Opinion polling for the 2013 Philippine Senate election =

Opinion polling (locally known as "surveys") for the 2013 Philippine Senate election is carried out by two major polling firms: Social Weather Stations (SWS), and Pulse Asia, with a handful of minor polling firms. A typical poll asks a voter to name twelve persons one would vote for in the senate election. The SWS and Pulse Asia's surveys are usually national in scope, while other polling firms usually restrict their samples within Metro Manila.

== Candidates ==
There two major coalitions in this election: Team PNoy (known as the LP-Akbayan-NPC-NP-LDP Coalition until January 27, 2013), and the United Nationalist Alliance (UNA). The two coalitions used to share three common candidates, until UNA dropped them. A third coalition, the Makabayang Koalisyon ng Mamamayan (Makabayan; Patriotic Coalition of the People) share four candidates from Team PNoy. A further two more parties put up ticket of three candidates each, two parties had a ticket made up of one candidate each, and three candidates are independents that are not a part of any ticket.

These are aside from the parties that put up candidates, and may belong to any coalition. In the tables below, the colors refer to the parties, unless otherwise stated in the seat totals sections.

- Key: Green tick: regular candidate, yellow tick: guest candidate.

Candidates	Alliances							
Candidates	AKP	BP	DPP	Maka- bayan	SJS	Team PNoy	UNA	None
Samson Alcantara								
Sonny Angara								
Bam Aquino								
Greco Belgica								
Nancy Binay								
Teodoro Casiño								
Alan Peter Cayetano								
Tingting Cojuangco								
Rizalito David								
John Carlos de los Reyes								
JV Ejercito								
Jack Enrile								
Francis Escudero								
Baldomero Falcone								
Richard J. Gordon								
Edward Hagedorn								
Gregorio Honasan								
Risa Hontiveros								
Loren Legarda								
Marwil Llasos								
Ernesto Maceda								
Jamby Madrigal								
Mitos Magsaysay								
Ramon Magsaysay Jr.								
Ramon Montaño								
Ricardo Penson								
Aquilino Pimentel III								
Grace Poe								
Christian Señeres								
Antonio Trillanes								
Eddie Villanueva								
Cynthia Villar								
Migz Zubiri								
Totals (regulars+guests)	3	1	3	1+7	1	9+3	9	3

Note:

- Francis Escudero, Loren Legarda and Grace Poe were included as guest candidates of UNA until they were dropped from the ticket on February 21. Polls that are taken before that date includes the three as part of the UNA ticket in the tables below; those that are after on or after the date excludes them from the UNA tallies.

== Voting preferences per candidate ==
Top 12 in the survey
Outside the top 12 but within the margin of error

Key dates:

- Period of submission of certificates of candidacies: October 1 to 5, 2012
- Start of campaign period for Senate candidates: February 12, 2013
- Start of campaign period for local candidates: March 29, 2013 (Due to that date being a Good Friday, campaigning officially starts on March 30.)
- News blackout on election surveys for the Senate election: April 28–May 12, 2013
- Election day: May 13, 2013

=== Until filing of certificates of candidacy ===
Pollster		Pulse Asia	Pulse Asia	Pulse Asia	SWS	The Center	Pulse Asia
Date(s) administered		November 10–23, 2011	February 26–March 9, 2012	May 20–26, 2012	August 24–27, 2012	August 24–30, 2012	August 31–September 7, 2012
Sample size		1,200	1,200	1,200	1,200	1,200	1,200
Margin of error		±3.0%	±3.0%	±3.0%	±3.0%	±3.0%	±3.0%
Candidates	1	Escudero (Ind.), 65.8%	Legarda (NPC), 58.5%	Escudero (Ind.), 65.1%	Escudero (Ind.), 62%	Escudero (Ind.), 66%	Legarda (NPC), 67.3%
Candidates	2	Legarda (NPC), 58.9%	Escudero (Ind.), 52.7%	Legarda (NPC), 63.6%	Legarda (NPC), 57%	Legarda (NPC), 59.3%	Escudero (Ind.), 61.2%
Candidates	3	Roxas (LP), 43.0%	Roxas (LP), 41.8%	Cayetano (NP), 50.2%	Cayetano (NP), 49%	Cayetano (NP), 54%	Cayetano (NP), 49.9%
Candidates	4	Cayetano (NP), 40.3%	Cayetano (NP), 41.6%	Enrile (NPC), 49.1%	Enrile (NPC), 48%	Pimentel (PDP), 46.6% Enrile (NPC), 46.6%	Ejercito (PMP), 49.9%
Candidates	5	de Castro (Ind.), 34.8%	Enrile (NPC), 38.2%	Roxas (LP), 47.5%	Honasan (Ind.), 40%	Pimentel (PDP), 46.6% Enrile (NPC), 46.6%	Enrile (NPC), 47.4%
Candidates	6	Ejercito (PMP), 30.4%	de Castro (Ind.), 34.6%	Honasan (Ind.), 39.5%	Angara (LDP), 40%	Honasan (Ind.), 43%	Trillanes (NP), 41.2%
Candidates	7	Honasan (Ind.), 29.6%	Trillanes (Ind.), 33.7%	Pimentel (PDP), 38.9%	Trillanes (NP), 40%	K. Aquino (Ind.), 39.8%	Honasan (Ind.), 40.6%
Candidates	8	Enrile (NPC), 29.5%	Honasan (Ind.), 32.1%	Ejercito (PMP), 36.3%	Ejercito (PMP), 38%	Ejercito (PMP), 37.3%	Pimentel (PDP), 39.2%
Candidates	9	Pimentel (PDP), 29.4%	Ejercito (PMP), 31.3%	Trillanes (Ind.), 34.8%	Pimentel (PDP), 38%	Villar (NP), 35%	Zubiri (PMP), 37.4%
Candidates	10	de Lima (Ind.), 29.4%	Pimentel (PDP), 29.0%	Zubiri (PMP), 30.4%	Zubiri (PMP), 34%	Gordon (B-VNP), 30.2% Zubiri (PMP), 30.2%	Angara (LDP), 35.9%
Candidates	11	Trillanes (Ind.), 28.7%	Failon (Ind.), 26.9%	Gordon (B-VNP), 29.6%	Villar (NP), 32.7%	Gordon (B-VNP), 30.2% Zubiri (PMP), 30.2%	Villar (NP), 34%
Candidates	12	Zubiri (Ind.), 26.9%	de Lima (Ind.), 26.6%	Angara (LDP), 28.9%	Gordon (B-VNP), 28%	Biazon (LP), 27% Angara (LDP), 27%	Binay (PDP), 27.4%
Candidates	13	Angara (LDP), 24.3%	Biazon (LP), 22.5%	Binay (PDP), 27.5%	de Lima (Ind.), 27%	Biazon (LP), 27% Angara (LDP), 27%	Gordon (B-VNP), 26.2%
Candidates	14	Madrigal (Ind.), 24.0%	Zubiri (Ind.), 22.4%	Villar (NP), 25.1%	R. Magsaysay (LP), 24%	R. Magsaysay (LP), 23%	R. Magsaysay (LP), 25.4%
Candidates	15	Gordon (B-VNP), 22.1%	Madrigal (Ind.), 21.8%	Madrigal (Ind.), 23.4%	Biazon (LP), 23%	de Venecia (PDP), 20.2% Santos-Recto (LP), 20.2% M. Magsaysay (PDP), 20.2%	Madrigal (Ind.), 23.2%
None/refused/undecided		5.2%	3.0%	3.0%	3%	—N/a	6.0%

=== Until the campaign period for the Senate election ===
Pollster		StratPOLLS	Pulse Asia	SWS	The Center	SWS/Business World	Pulse Asia
Date(s) administered		October 8–17, 2012	November 23–29, 2012	November 29–December 3, 2012	January 9–17, 2013	January 17–19, 2013	January 19–30, 2013
Sample size		300	1,200	1,200	1,200	1,200	1,800
Margin of error		<3%, >4%	±3.0%	±3.0%	—N/a	±3.0%	±2.0%
Candidates	1	Legarda (NPC), 64%	Escudero (Ind.), 74.1%	Legarda (NPC), 68%	Legarda (NPC)	Legarda (NPC), 65%	Legarda (NPC), 58.6%
Candidates	2	Escudero (Ind.), 63%	Legarda (NPC), 69.3%	Escudero (Ind.), 61%	Escudero (Ind.)	Escudero (Ind.), 62%	Escudero (Ind.), 54.3%
Candidates	3	Cayetano (NP), 58%	Cayetano (NP), 60.1%	Cayetano (NP), 58%	Cayetano (NP)	Cayetano (NP), 60%	Cayetano (NP), 48.9%
Candidates	4	Pimentel (PDP), 45%	Ejercito (UNA), 57.0%	Villar (NP), 51%	Ejercito (UNA)	Ejercito (UNA), 53%	Binay (UNA), 43.6%
Candidates	5	Villar (NP), 42%	Enrile (NPC), 53.2%	Ejercito (UNA), 49%	Pimentel (PDP)	Honasan (UNA), 48% Pimentel (PDP), 48%	Ejercito (UNA), 43.5%
Candidates	6	Angara (LDP), 40%	Villar (NP), 52.2%	Pimentel (PDP), 46% Enrile (NPC), 46%	Villar (NP)	Honasan (UNA), 48% Pimentel (PDP), 48%	Trillanes (NP), 41.1%
Candidates	7	Ejercito (UNA), 37%	Pimentel (PDP), 50.2%	Pimentel (PDP), 46% Enrile (NPC), 46%	Honasan (UNA)	Zubiri (UNA), 47%	Pimentel (PDP), 40.7%
Candidates	8	Gordon (UNA), 35%	Honasan (UNA), 44.9%	Honasan (UNA), 43%	Zubiri (UNA)	Villar (NP), 46% Enrile (NPC), 46%	Enrile (NPC), 40.4%
Candidates	9	Zubiri (UNA), 33%	Trillanes (NP), 43.2%	Binay (UNA), 41% Zubiri (UNA), 41%	Enrile (NPC)	Villar (NP), 46% Enrile (NPC), 46%	Villar (NP), 39.1%
Candidates	10	Enrile (NPC), 29% Honasan (UNA), 29%	Binay (UNA), 41.3%	Binay (UNA), 41% Zubiri (UNA), 41%	Binay (UNA)	Trillanes (NP), 45% Poe (Ind.), 45%	Zubiri (UNA), 37.6%
Candidates	11	Enrile (NPC), 29% Honasan (UNA), 29%	Angara (LDP), 40.8%	Trillanes (NP), 40%	Trillanes (NP)	Trillanes (NP), 45% Poe (Ind.), 45%	Angara (LDP), 37.1%
Candidates	12	Madrigal (LP), 28%	Zubiri (UNA), 40.5%	Gordon (UNA), 37%	Poe (Ind.)	Binay (UNA), 43%	Honasan (UNA), 36.8%
Candidates	13	Trillanes (NP), 27%	Madrigal (LP), 34.4%	Angara (LDP), 35%		Angara (LDP), 39%	Aquino (LP), 31.4%
Candidates	14	Hagedorn (Ind.), 25%	Gordon (UNA), 29.7%	Madrigal (LP), 30%		Gordon (UNA), 36%	Poe (Ind.), 30.9%
Candidates	15	Poe (Ind.), 23%	R. Magsaysay (LP), 28.8%	R. Magsaysay (LP), 29%		Aquino (LP), 34%	Gordon (UNA), 30.0%
Candidates	16		Aquino (LP), 27.9%	Maceda (UNA), 25%		R. Magsaysay (LP), 33%	Madrigal (LP), 26.8%
Candidates	17		Poe (Ind.), 24.7%	Aquino (LP), 24%		Madrigal (LP), 28%	R. Magsaysay (LP), 23.8%
Candidates	18		Hontiveros (Akbayan), 21.2%	Hontiveros (Akbayan), 21%		Hontiveros (Akbayan), 25% Maceda (UNA), 25%	Hontiveros (Akbayan), 17.5%
Candidates	19		Maceda (UNA), 16.7%	M. Magsaysay (UNA), 14%		Hontiveros (Akbayan), 25% Maceda (UNA), 25%	Maceda (UNA), 15.5%
Candidates	20		Cojuangco (UNA), 14.2%	Poe (Ind.), 13%		Cojuangco (UNA), 14%	Cojuangco (UNA), 11.8%
Candidates	21		Hagedorn (Ind.), 8.8%	Hagedorn (Ind.), 11%		M. Magsaysay (UNA), 13% Hagedorn (Ind.), 13%	M. Magsaysay (UNA), 9.9%
Candidates	22		M. Magsaysay (UNA), 7.7%	Cojuangco (UNA), 10% Casiño (Makabayan), 10%		M. Magsaysay (UNA), 13% Hagedorn (Ind.), 13%	Hagedorn (Ind.), 9.3%
Candidates	23		Casiño (Makabayan), 5.3%	Cojuangco (UNA), 10% Casiño (Makabayan), 10%		Villanueva (BP), 12%	Villanueva (BP), 9.2%
Candidates	24		Alcantara (SJS), 4.0%	David (AKP), 7%		Casiño (Makabayan), 11%	Casiño (Makabayan), 5.7%
Candidates	25		Montaño (Ind.), 3.3%	Alcantara (SJS), 4.0% Montaño (Ind.), 3.3%		Montaño (Ind.), 6% David (AKP), 6% Alcantara (SJS), 6%	Alcantara (SJS), 3.8%
Candidates	26		David (AKP), 2.8%	Alcantara (SJS), 4.0% Montaño (Ind.), 3.3%		Montaño (Ind.), 6% David (AKP), 6% Alcantara (SJS), 6%	David (AKP), 3.6% Montaño (Ind.), 3.6%
Candidates	27		de los Reyes (AKP), 2.7%	de los Reyes (AKP), 5%		Montaño (Ind.), 6% David (AKP), 6% Alcantara (SJS), 6%	David (AKP), 3.6% Montaño (Ind.), 3.6%
Candidates	28		Falcone (DPP), 1.9%	Belgica (DPP), 4%		de los Reyes (AKP), 5%	de los Reyes (AKP), 2.8%
Candidates	29		Penson (Ind.), 1.8%	Penson (Ind.), 3% Falcone (DPP), 3%		Belgica (DPP), 3% Penson (Ind.), 3% Falcone (DPP), 3% Señeres (DPP), 3%	Señeres (DPP), 1.3%
Candidates	30		Belgica (DPP), 0.7%	Penson (Ind.), 3% Falcone (DPP), 3%		Belgica (DPP), 3% Penson (Ind.), 3% Falcone (DPP), 3% Señeres (DPP), 3%	Penson (Ind.), 1.2%
Candidates	31		Llasos (AKP), 0.7%	Llasos (AKP), 2% Señeres (DPP), 2%		Belgica (DPP), 3% Penson (Ind.), 3% Falcone (DPP), 3% Señeres (DPP), 3%	Belgica (DPP), 0.8%
Candidates	32		Señeres (DPP), 0.5%	Llasos (AKP), 2% Señeres (DPP), 2%		Belgica (DPP), 3% Penson (Ind.), 3% Falcone (DPP), 3% Señeres (DPP), 3%	Falcone (DPP), 0.5% Llasos (AKP), 0.5%
Candidates	33					Llasos (AKP), 2%	Falcone (DPP), 0.5% Llasos (AKP), 0.5%
None Refused Undecided		NA	4.2%	1%	—N/a	2%	8.6%

=== Until the campaign period for local elections ===
Pollster		SWS/BW	Pulse Asia	StratPOLLS	SWS/BW	Pulse Asia
Date(s) administered		February 15–17, 2013	February 24–28, 2013	March 8–13, 2013	March 15–17, 2013	March 16–20, 2013
Sample size		1,200	1,800	1,200	1,200	1,800
Margin of error		±3%	±2%	±3.5%	±3%	±2%
Candidates	1	Legarda (NPC), 64%	Legarda (NPC), 56.7%	Legarda (NPC), 75.2%	Legarda (NPC), 59%	Legarda (NPC), 55.3%
Candidates	2	Escudero (Ind.), 62%	Escudero (Ind.), 54.9%	Escudero (Ind.), 63.2%	Cayetano (NP), 57%	Escudero (Ind.), 51.5%
Candidates	3	Cayetano (NP), 58%	Cayetano (NP), 52.8%	Poe (Ind.), 63.0%	Ejercito (UNA), 48% Escudero (Ind.), 48%	Cayetano (NP), 48.7%
Candidates	4	Villar (NP), 53%	Villar (NP), 44.0%	Cayetano (NP), 62.1%	Ejercito (UNA), 48% Escudero (Ind.), 48%	Poe (Ind.), 42.1%
Candidates	5	Poe (Ind.), 48% Pimentel (PDP), 48%	Ejercito (UNA), 43.8%	Binay (UNA), 59.7%	Binay (UNA), 47% Villar (NP), 47% Pimentel (PDP), 47%	Pimentel (PDP), 41.7%
Candidates	6	Poe (Ind.), 48% Pimentel (PDP), 48%	Aquino (LP), 43.2%	Ejercito (UNA), 59.0%	Binay (UNA), 47% Villar (NP), 47% Pimentel (PDP), 47%	Villar (NP), 40.8%
Candidates	7	Binay (UNA), 47%	Binay (UNA), 42.5%	Trillanes (NP), 54.7% Enrile (NPC), 54.7%	Binay (UNA), 47% Villar (NP), 47% Pimentel (PDP), 47%	Binay (UNA), 39.6%
Candidates	8	Trillanes (NP), 46%	Poe (Ind.), 42.1%	Trillanes (NP), 54.7% Enrile (NPC), 54.7%	Trillanes (NP), 44%	Aquino (LP), 38.6% Ejercito (UNA), 38.6%
Candidates	9	Ejercito (UNA), 42% Aquino (LP), 42%	Pimentel (PDP), 40.1%	Angara (LDP), 54.0%	Honasan (UNA), 43%	Aquino (LP), 38.6% Ejercito (UNA), 38.6%
Candidates	10	Ejercito (UNA), 42% Aquino (LP), 42%	Honasan (UNA), 37.9%	Zubiri (UNA), 52.1%	Aquino (LP), 42%	Trillanes (NP), 37.7%
Candidates	11	Angara (LDP), 39% Zubiri (UNA), 39%	Enrile (NPC), 36.6%	Aquino (LP), 50.0%	Poe (Ind.), 40%	Honasan (UNA), 36.8%
Candidates	12	Angara (LDP), 39% Zubiri (UNA), 39%	Trillanes (NP), 36.1%	Pimentel (PDP), 49.4%	Angara (LDP), 39%	Angara (LDP), 34.6%
Candidates	13	Enrile (NPC), 38%	Angara (LDP), 35.1%	Villar (NP), 49.1%	Enrile (NPC), 37% R. Magsaysay (LP), 37%	Zubiri (UNA), 32.5%
Candidates	14	Madrigal (LP), 36%	Zubiri (UNA), 33.2%	Honasan (UNA), 48.1%	Enrile (NPC), 37% R. Magsaysay (LP), 37%	Enrile (NPC), 32.4%
Candidates	15	Honasan (UNA), 34%	Gordon (UNA), 32.2%	Gordon (UNA), 38.7%	Zubiri (UNA), 35%	Gordon (UNA), 30.7%
Candidates	16	R. Magsaysay (LP), 32%	Madrigal (LP), 30.6%	Hontiveros (Akbayan), 37.7%	Madrigal (LP), 33% Gordon (UNA), 33%	R. Magsaysay (LP), 28.2%
Candidates	17	Gordon (UNA), 31%	R. Magsaysay (LP), 27.0%	R. Magsaysay (LP), 34.7%	Madrigal (LP), 33% Gordon (UNA), 33%	Madrigal (LP), 27.3%
Candidates	18	Hontiveros (Akbayan), 25%	Hontiveros (Akbayan), 24.1%	Madrigal (LP), 29.8%	Hontiveros (Akbayan), 29%	Hontiveros (Akbayan), 24.3%
Candidates	19	Maceda (UNA), 15%	Maceda (UNA), 16.3%	Maceda (UNA), 23.6%	Maceda (UNA), 18%	Maceda (UNA), 14.1%
Candidates	20	Cojuangco (UNA), 13% Villanueva (BP), 13% M. Magsaysay (UNA), 13%	M. Magsaysay (UNA), 14.5%	Cojuangco (UNA), 23.4%	Cojuangco (UNA), 14% M. Magsaysay (UNA), 14%	M. Magsaysay (UNA), 12.7%
Candidates	21	Cojuangco (UNA), 13% Villanueva (BP), 13% M. Magsaysay (UNA), 13%	Cojuangco (UNA), 14.4%	Villanueva (BP), 21.0%	Cojuangco (UNA), 14% M. Magsaysay (UNA), 14%	Cojuangco (UNA), 12.7% Hagedorn (Ind.), 12.7%
Candidates	22	Cojuangco (UNA), 13% Villanueva (BP), 13% M. Magsaysay (UNA), 13%	Hagedorn (Ind.), 13.3%	M. Magsaysay (UNA), 20.8%	Villanueva (BP), 13%	Cojuangco (UNA), 12.7% Hagedorn (Ind.), 12.7%
Candidates	23	Hagedorn (Ind.), 10%	Villanueva (BP), 12.7%	Hagedorn (Ind.), 16.3%	Hagedorn (Ind.), 11%	Villanueva (BP), 10.2%
Candidates	24	Casiño (Makabayan), 9%	Casiño (Makabayan), 7.7%	de los Reyes (AKP), 12.3%	Casiño (Makabayan), 7%	Casiño (Makabayan), 7.2%
Candidates	25	David (AKP), 5%	de los Reyes (AKP), 4.2%	Casiño (Makabayan), 8.7%	Llasos (AKP), 4% Alcantara (SJS), 4% Penson (Ind.), 4% Montaño (Ind.), 4% Falcone (DPP), 4%	de los Reyes (AKP), 3.0%
Candidates	26	Montaño (Ind.), 4% de los Reyes (AKP), 4%	Montaño (Ind.), 4.0%	Montaño (Ind.), 8.5%	Llasos (AKP), 4% Alcantara (SJS), 4% Penson (Ind.), 4% Montaño (Ind.), 4% Falcone (DPP), 4%	Montaño (Ind.), 2.9%
Candidates	27	Montaño (Ind.), 4% de los Reyes (AKP), 4%	Alcantara (SJS), 3.4%	Belgica (DPP), 6.2%	Llasos (AKP), 4% Alcantara (SJS), 4% Penson (Ind.), 4% Montaño (Ind.), 4% Falcone (DPP), 4%	Alcantara (SJS), 2.6%
Candidates	28	Penson (Ind.), 3% Alcantara (SJS), 3% Belgica (DPP), 3%	Belgica (DPP), 3.2%	David (AKP), 5.9%	Llasos (AKP), 4% Alcantara (SJS), 4% Penson (Ind.), 4% Montaño (Ind.), 4% Falcone (DPP), 4%	David (AKP), 2.3%
Candidates	29	Penson (Ind.), 3% Alcantara (SJS), 3% Belgica (DPP), 3%	David (AKP), 2.8%	Penson (Ind.), 5.4%	Llasos (AKP), 4% Alcantara (SJS), 4% Penson (Ind.), 4% Montaño (Ind.), 4% Falcone (DPP), 4%	Belgica (DPP), 2.0% Falcone (DPP), 2.0% Penson (Ind.), 2.0%
Candidates	30	Penson (Ind.), 3% Alcantara (SJS), 3% Belgica (DPP), 3%	Falcone (DPP), 2.5%	Llasos (AKP), 5.1%	David (AKP), 3% Señeres (DPP), 3% de los Reyes (AKP), 3%	Belgica (DPP), 2.0% Falcone (DPP), 2.0% Penson (Ind.), 2.0%
Candidates	31	Señeres (DPP), 2% Falcone (DPP), 2% Llasos (AKP), 2%	Penson (Ind.), 2.4%	Alcantara (SJS), 4.6%	David (AKP), 3% Señeres (DPP), 3% de los Reyes (AKP), 3%	Belgica (DPP), 2.0% Falcone (DPP), 2.0% Penson (Ind.), 2.0%
Candidates	32	Señeres (DPP), 2% Falcone (DPP), 2% Llasos (AKP), 2%	Señeres (DPP), 2.3%	Señeres (DPP), 4.0%	David (AKP), 3% Señeres (DPP), 3% de los Reyes (AKP), 3%	Llasos (AKP), 1.7%
Candidates	33	Señeres (DPP), 2% Falcone (DPP), 2% Llasos (AKP), 2%	Llasos (AKP), 1.6%	Falcone (DPP), 3.6%	Belgica (DPP), 2%	Señeres (DPP), 1.0%
None Refused Undecided		2% undecided 4% invalid markings	5.5% none/refused/don't know 2.6% invalid votes	—N/a	2% undecided 5% invalid markings	7.7% none/refused/don't know 5.2% invalid votes

=== Until election day ===
Pollster		SWS	Pulse Asia	SWS	Pulse Asia
Date(s) administered		April 13–15, 2013	April 20–22, 2013	May 2–3, 2013	May 10–11, 2013
Sample size		1,800	1,800	2,400	1,800
Margin of error		±2%	±2%	±2%	±2%
Candidates	1	Legarda (NPC), 59%	Legarda (NPC), 51.5%	Legarda (NPC), 57%	Legarda (NPC), 55.8%
Candidates	2	Cayetano (NP), 52%	Escudero (Ind.), 48.3%	Cayetano (NP), 50%	Escudero (Ind.), 52.7%
Candidates	3	Binay (UNA), 49% Villar (NP), 49%	Poe (Ind.), 42.4%	Binay (UNA), 48% Escudero (Ind.), 48%	Cayetano (NP), 51.1%
Candidates	4	Binay (UNA), 49% Villar (NP), 49%	Cayetano (NP), 40.0%	Binay (UNA), 48% Escudero (Ind.), 48%	Poe (Ind.), 49.9%
Candidates	5	Escudero (Ind.), 47%	Villar (NP), 37.7%	Poe (Ind.), 45%	Binay (UNA), 46.9%
Candidates	6	Aquino (LP), 44%	Trillanes (NP), 35.8%	Ejercito (UNA), 44% Villar (NP), 44%	Villar (NP), 46.6%
Candidates	7	Pimentel (PDP), 43% Ejercito (UNA), 43%	Aquino (LP), 35.7%	Ejercito (UNA), 44% Villar (NP), 44%	Aquino (LP), 45.9%
Candidates	8	Pimentel (PDP), 43% Ejercito (UNA), 43%	Ejercito (UNA), 34.7%	Pimentel (PDP), 43%	Angara (LDP), 42.4%
Candidates	9	Angara (LDP), 42%	Binay (UNA), 34.6%	Aquino (LP), 41%	Ejercito (UNA), 41.7%
Candidates	10	Poe (Ind.), 39% Trillanes (NP), 39%	Pimentel (PDP), 32.7%	Angara (LDP), 38% Trillanes (NP), 38%	Pimentel (PDP), 39.6%
Candidates	11	Poe (Ind.), 39% Trillanes (NP), 39%	Angara (LDP), 31.2%	Angara (LDP), 38% Trillanes (NP), 38%	Trillanes (NP), 37.7%
Candidates	12	Enrile (NPC), 37% Honasan (UNA), 37%	Zubiri (UNA), 29.7%	Honasan (UNA), 37%	Honasan (UNA), 36.7%
Candidates	13	Enrile (NPC), 37% Honasan (UNA), 37%	Honasan (UNA), 27.9%	Enrile (NPC), 35%	Enrile (NPC), 35.7%
Candidates	14	Zubiri (UNA), 35% R. Magsaysay (LP), 35%	Enrile (NPC), 27.2%	R. Magsaysay (LP), 33% Zubiri (UNA), 33%	R. Magsaysay (LP), 33.3%
Candidates	15	Zubiri (UNA), 35% R. Magsaysay (LP), 35%	Hontiveros (Akbayan), 25.8%	R. Magsaysay (LP), 33% Zubiri (UNA), 33%	Zubiri (UNA), 32.1%
Candidates	16	Madrigal (LP), 30%	R. Magsaysay (LP), 25.6%	Hontiveros (Akbayan), 29%	Gordon (UNA), 31.8%
Candidates	17	Hontiveros (Akbayan), 29%	Gordon (UNA), 22.4%	Gordon (UNA), 27%	Hontiveros (Akbayan), 29.9%
Candidates	18	Gordon (UNA), 27%	Madrigal (LP), 20.4%	Madrigal (LP), 25%	Madrigal (LP), 26.2%
Candidates	19	Hagedorn (Ind.), 17%	Hagedorn (Ind.), 13.7%	Hagedorn (Ind.), 16%	Hagedorn (Ind.), 19.8%
Candidates	20	Maceda (UNA), 16%	M. Magsaysay (UNA), 11.0%	Villanueva (BP), 15%	Villanueva (BP), 16.4%
Candidates	21	M. Magsaysay (UNA), 15%	Villanueva (BP), 10.8%	Maceda (UNA), 14%	M. Magsaysay (UNA), 13.5%
Candidates	22	Cojuangco (UNA), 14%	Maceda (UNA), 9.1%	M. Magsaysay (UNA), 13%	Maceda (UNA), 11.6%
Candidates	23	Villanueva (BP), 13%	Cojuangco (UNA), 7.3%	Cojuangco (UNA), 11%	Cojuangco (UNA), 11.3%
Candidates	24	Casiño (Makabayan), 7%	Casiño (Makabayan), 6.5%	Casiño (Makabayan), 9%	Casiño (Makabayan), 10.3%
Candidates	25	Montaño (Ind.), 5%	Alcantara (SJS), 2.4%	Montaño (Ind.), 5%	Alcantara (SJS), 3.4%
Candidates	26	David (AKP), 4%	de los Reyes (AKP), 2.1% Montaño (Ind.), 2.1%	Alcantara (SJS), 3% de los Reyes (AKP), 3% David (AKP), 3%	de los Reyes (AKP), 2.9%
Candidates	27	de los Reyes (AKP), 3% Alcantara (SJS), 3% Penson (Ind.), 3%	de los Reyes (AKP), 2.1% Montaño (Ind.), 2.1%	Alcantara (SJS), 3% de los Reyes (AKP), 3% David (AKP), 3%	Belgica (DPP), 2.8%
Candidates	28	de los Reyes (AKP), 3% Alcantara (SJS), 3% Penson (Ind.), 3%	David (AKP), 1.6%	Alcantara (SJS), 3% de los Reyes (AKP), 3% David (AKP), 3%	Montaño (Ind.), 2.4%
Candidates	29	de los Reyes (AKP), 3% Alcantara (SJS), 3% Penson (Ind.), 3%	Belgica (DPP), 1.3%	Penson (Ind.), 2% Falcone (DPP), 2% Llasos (AKP), 2% Belgica (DPP), 2%	David (AKP), 2.2%
Candidates	30	Falcone (DPP), 2% Señeres (DPP), 2% Llasos (AKP), 2% Belgica (DPP), 2%	Falcone (DPP), 1.1% Penson (Ind.), 1.1%	Penson (Ind.), 2% Falcone (DPP), 2% Llasos (AKP), 2% Belgica (DPP), 2%	Falcone (DPP), 1.9%
Candidates	31	Falcone (DPP), 2% Señeres (DPP), 2% Llasos (AKP), 2% Belgica (DPP), 2%	Falcone (DPP), 1.1% Penson (Ind.), 1.1%	Penson (Ind.), 2% Falcone (DPP), 2% Llasos (AKP), 2% Belgica (DPP), 2%	Llasos (AKP), 1.7%
Candidates	32	Falcone (DPP), 2% Señeres (DPP), 2% Llasos (AKP), 2% Belgica (DPP), 2%	Llasos (AKP), 1.0%	Penson (Ind.), 2% Falcone (DPP), 2% Llasos (AKP), 2% Belgica (DPP), 2%	Penson (Ind.), 1.6%
Candidates	33	Falcone (DPP), 2% Señeres (DPP), 2% Llasos (AKP), 2% Belgica (DPP), 2%	Señeres (DPP), 0.7%	Señeres (DPP), 1%	Señeres (DPP), 1.6%
None Refused Undecided		2% undecided 4% invalid markings	6.1% none/refused/don't know 4.1% invalid votes	3% undecided 3% invalid markings	2.8% none/refused/don't know 5.0% invalid votes

=== Rankings ===
Top 12 in the survey
Outside the top 12 but within the margin of error

- Polls administered after October 2010, the deadline for the filing of certificates of candidacies.
- The rankings below are from the pollsters that published them. The pollsters may or may not consider "statistical ties", or candidates whose voting preferences' margins are within the margin of error .

Candidate	Strat-POLLS	Pulse Asia	SWS	The Center	SWS	Pulse Asia	SWS	Pulse Asia	Strat-POLLS	SWS	Pulse Asia	SWS	Pulse Asia	SWS	Pulse Asia
Candidate	10/8−17	11/23−29	11/29−12/3	1/9−17	1/17−19	1/19−30	2/15−17	2/24−28	3/8−13	3/15−17	3/16−20	4/13−15	4/13−15	5/2−3	5/10−11
Samson Alcantara	—N/a	23–27	25–26	—N/a	25–27	24–28	28–30	25–32	31	25–29	25–32	27–29	25–29	26–28	25−30
Sonny Angara	6	8–12	13	—N/a	13	6–12	11–12	10–15	9	12	8–15	9	8–14	10–11	5–10
Bam Aquino	—N/a	14–17	17	—N/a	15	13–15	9–10	4–9	11	10	4–12	6	4–10	9	4–9
Greco Belgica	—N/a	28–32	28	—N/a	29–32	29–33	28–30	25–32	27	33	25–33	30–33	25–33	30–32	25–33
Nancy Binay	—N/a	8–12	9–10	10	12	4–9	7	4–9	5	5–7	4–11	3–4	5–11	3–4	3–8
Teodoro Casiño	—N/a	22–25	22–23	—N/a	24	24–25	24	24	25	24	24	24	23–24	24	22–24
Alan Peter Cayetano	3	3–4	3	3	3	3	3	1–3	4	2	2–3	2	3–7	2	2–6
Tingting Cojuangco	—N/a	19–20	22–23	—N/a	20	20–23	20–22	19–23	20	20–21	19–23	22	22–24	23	21–24
Rizalito David	—N/a	24–29	24	—N/a	25–27	25–28	25	25–33	28	30–32	25–32	26	25–33	26–28	25–33
John Carlos de los Reyes	—N/a	24–29	27	—N/a	28	25–28	26–27	25–29	24	30–32	25–32	27–29	25–32	26–28	25–33
JV Ejercito	7	3–6	5	4	4	4–9	9–10	4–9	6	3–4	4–12	7–8	5–11	6–7	7–11
Jack Enrile	10–11	4–7	6–7	9	8–9	4–12	13	9–15	7–8	13–14	11–16	7–8	11–16	13	10–16
Francis Escudero	2	1–2	2	2	2	1–2	2	1–3	2	3–4	1–3	5	1–2	3–4	1–2
Baldomero Falcone	—N/a	28	25–31	—N/a	29–32	29–33	31–33	26–33	33	25–29	25–33	30–33	26–33	29–32	25–33
Richard J. Gordon	8	13–17	12	—N/a	14	13-16	17	11–16	15	16–17	12–17	18	14–18	17	13–17
Edward Hagedorn	14	21–22	21	—N/a	21–22	20–23	23	19–23	23	23	19–23	19	19–21	19	19–20
Gregorio Honasan	10–11	7–12	8	7	5–6	6–12	15	8–13	14	9	6–14	12–13	11–16	12	10–14
Risa Hontiveros	—N/a	17–18	18	—N/a	18–19	18–19	18	17–18	16	18	16–18	17	12–17	16	14–18
Loren Legarda	1	1–2	1	1	1	1–2	1	1–3	1	1	1–2	1	1–2	1	1–2
Marwil Llasos	—N/a	28–32	31	—N/a	33	29–33	31–33	29–33	30	25–29	25–33	30–33	26–33	29–32	26–33
Ernesto Maceda	—N/a	19–20	16	—N/a	18–19	18–19	19	19–22	19	19	19–22	20	20–23	21	21–24
Jamby Madrigal	12	13–14	14	—N/a	17	14–17	14	14–17	18	16–17	15–18	16	17–18	18	17–18
Mitos Magsaysay	—N/a	21–23	19	—N/a	21–22	16–17	20–22	19–23	22	20–21	19–23	21	19–22	22	20–23
Ramon Magsaysay Jr.	—N/a	14–17	15	—N/a	16	16–17	16	16–18	17	13–14	13–18	14–15	12–17	14–15	11–17
Ramon Montaño	—N/a	23–29	25–26	—N/a	25–27	25–28	26–27	25–31	26	25–29	25–32	25	25–32	25	25–33
Ricardo Penson	—N/a	25–31	29	—N/a	29–32	29–33	28–30	26–33	29	25–29	25–33	27–29	26–33	29–32	26–33
Aquilino Pimentel III	4	5–8	6–7	5	5–6	4–12	5–6	4–12	12	5–7	4–10	7–8	6–12	8	8–13
Grace Poe	15	14–18	20	12	10–11	13–16	5–6	4–10	3	11	4–10	10–11	3–4	5	2–7
Christian Señeres	—N/a	30–32	31–32	—N/a	29–32	29–33	31–33	27–33	32	30–32	29–33	30–33	28–33	33	26–33
Antonio Trillanes	13	8–12	11	11	10–11	4–12	8	9–15	7–8	8	4–12	10–11	4–10	10–11	9–14
Eddie Villanueva	—N/a	—N/a	—N/a	—N/a	23	20–23	20–22	20–23	21	22	20–23	23	19–22	20	19–21
Cynthia Villar	5	4–7	4	6	8–9	4–12	4	4–9	13	5–7	4–11	3–4	4–9	6–7	3–8
Migz Zubiri	9	8–12	9–10	8	7	6–12	11–12	11–16	10	15	11–16	14–15	10–16	14–15	13–17

=== Graph ===
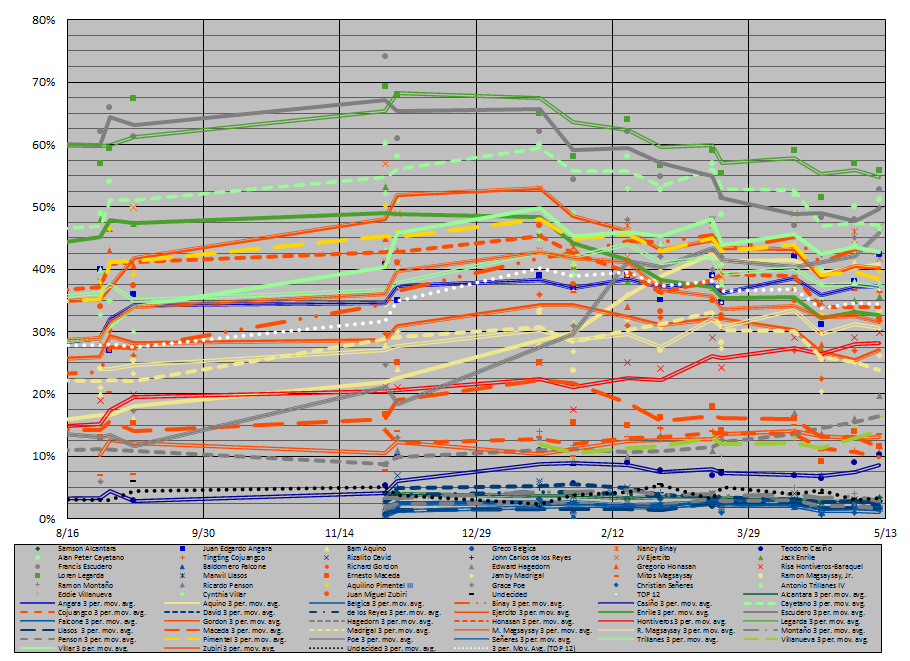

The result of each candidate's opinion poll (survey) result is denoted by a plot point, or a "period" (per.). The lines denote moving averages (mov. avg.) of the last three polls (each poll given equal weight) for each candidate; as pollsters may use different methodologies, it is invalid to plot each period from all pollsters as if it is a single series. Hence, a moving average is used to link all polls from all pollsters into one series. Some candidates may not appear on some polls, and these do not include candidates who are not on the final list but were included in other polls. The twelfth ranking candidate in each poll is denoted by a line, for easy reference.

== Seats won ==
The first figure denotes the number of candidates from the party or coalition that made it to the top 12 in each survey; the figures inside the parenthesis are other candidates that made it within the margin of error. The figure of the party or coalition (except independents) the most seats is highlighted; those that outright win a majority of seats contested (7, if 12 seats will be contested) is italicized, while the party or coalition that outright wins a majority of seats in the Senate (13) is boldfaced.

Some of the totals might not add up as most slates have shared candidates.

=== Before the filing of certificates of candidacy ===
Pollster	Date(s) administered	Sample size	Margin of error	B-VNP	LDP	LP	NP	NPC	PDP Laban	PMP	Ind.
**2010 election**	May 10, 2010	38.1 million	NA	0	0	3	2	1	0	2	1
Pulse Asia	Nov 10–23, 2011	1,200	±3.0%	0	0 (1)	1	1	2	1	1	6 (1)
Pulse Asia	Feb 26–Mar 6, 2012	1,200	±3.0%	0	0	1 (1)	1	2	1	1	5 (2)
April 4, 2012		The Pwersa ng Masang Pilipino and the Partido Demokratiko Pilipino-Lakas ng Bayan announced that they will form the United Nationalist Alliance.									
Pulse Asia	May 20–26, 2012	1,200	±3.0%	1	1	1	1 (1)	2	1 (1)	2	3 (1)
July 5, 2012		The Liberal Party announced they will form a united ticket with the Nacionalista Party and the Nationalist People's Coalition.									
SWS	Aug 24–27, 2012	1,200	±3.0%	1	1	0 (2)	3	2	1	2	1 (1)
The Center	Aug 24–30, 2012	1,200	±3.0%	1	1	1	2	2	1	1	4
Pulse Asia	Aug 31–Sept 7, 2012	1,200	±3.0%	0 (1)	1	0 (1)	3	2	2	2	2 (1)
October 1, 2012		President Aquino presents the united ticket of the LP-Akbayan-NP-NPC-LDP coalition.									
October 4, 2012		The United Nationalist Alliance completes its slate with the announcement of Nancy Binay as its 12th candidate.									

=== After the filing of certificates of candidacy ===
- Polls administered after October 5, 2010, the deadline for the filing of certificates of candidacies.

Pollster	Date(s) administered	Sample size	Margin of error	Parties								Alliances					
Pollster	Date(s) administered	Sample size	Margin of error	Ak- bayan	LDP	LP	NP	NPC	PDP Laban	UNA	Ind.	Others	Maka- bayan	Team PNoy	SC	UNA	Others
October 5, 2012		Deadline of submitting candidacies.															
StratPOLLS	Oct 8–17, 2012	300	<3%, >4%	0	1	1	2 (1)	2	1	4	1 (1)	0	4	5 (1)	2	5	0 (1)
Pulse Asia	Nov 23–29. 2012	1,200	±3%	0	1	0	3	2	1	4	1	0	4	5	2	5	0
SWS	Nov 29–Dec 3, 2012	1,200	±3%	0	0 (1)	0	3	2	1	5	1	0	4	4 (1)	2	6	0
January 7, 2013		United Nationalist Alliance releases its first TV advertisement.															
January 9, 2013		On the Senate funds controversy, Senate President Juan Ponce Enrile admits to giving "cash gifts" to all but four senators that are known critics of his.															
The Center	Jan 9–17, 2013	1,200	—N/a	0	0	0	3	2	1	4	2	0	5	4	3	5	0
SWS/BW	Jan 17–19, 2013	1,200	±3%	0	0	0	3	2	1	4	2	0	5	4	3	5	0
January 21−23, 2013		On the Senate funds controversy, Senate President Juan Ponce Enrile was retained as senate president in a virtual vote of confidence. Two days later, he and Minority Floor Leader Alan Peter Cayetano engaged in a word war that turned personal.															
Pulse Asia	Jan 19–30, 2013	1,800	±2%	0	1	0	3	2	1	4	1	0	4	5	2	5	0
January 28, 2013		United ticket of the Liberal Party, Nacionalista Party and the NPC is rebranded as "Team PNoy", and releases its first TV advertisement.															
February 12, 2013		Start of campaign period for the Senate election.															
SWS	Feb 15–17, 2013	1,200	±3%	0	1	1 (1)	3	1 (1)	1	3	2	0	5	6 (1)	3	3 (1)	0
February 21, 2013		United Nationalist Alliance drops Francis Escudero, Loren Legarda and Grace Poe as guest candidates.															
Pulse Asia	Feb 24–28, 2013	1,800	±2%	0	0 (1)	1	3	2	1	3 (2)	2	0	5	8 (1)		4 (2)	0
March 1, 2013		A standoff between the Malaysian authorities and armed men claiming to be from the Sultanate of Sulu erupted into a military crisis that lasted for the rest of the month.															
StratPOLLS	Mar 8–13, 2013	1,200	±3.5%	0	1	1	2 (1)	2	1	3 (1)	2	0	4 (1)	8 (1)		4 (1)	0
SWS	Mar 15–17, 2013	1,200	±3%	0	1	1 (1)	3	1 (1)	1	3	2	0	5	9 (1)		3 (1)	0
March 20, 2013		The parents of actress Heart Evangelista held a press conference to announce their disapproval of their daughter's relationship with Senator Francis Escudero.															
Pulse Asia	Mar 16–20, 2013	1,800	±2%	0	1	1	3	1 (1)	1	3 (2)	2	0	5	9		3 (3)	0
March 30, 2013		Start of campaign period for local positions. As this was a Good Friday, campaigning in earnest was not allowed to start until March 31.															
SWS	Apr 13–15, 2013	1,800	±2%	0	1	1 (1)	3	2	1	3 (1)	2	0	5	9 (1)		4 (1)	0
Pulse Asia	April 20–22, 2013	1,800	±2%	0 (1)	1	1 (1)	3	1 (1)	1	3 (1)	2	0	5	9 (2)		3 (2)	0
SWS	May 2–3, 2013	2,400	±2%	0	1	1 (1)	3	1 (1)	1	3 (1)	2	0	6	9 (1)		3 (2)	0
Pulse Asia	May 10–11, 2013	1,800	±2%	0	1	1 (1)	3	1 (1)	1	3	2	0	5	9 (1)		3 (1)	0

== Composition of the Senate ==
The first figure denotes the number of candidates from the party or coalition that made it to the top 12 in each survey; the figures inside the parenthesis are other candidates that made it within the margin of error. The figure of the party or coalition (except independents) that has the most seats is highlighted; those that outright wins a majority of seats in the Senate (13) is boldfaced.

These are polls administered after October 5, 2010, the deadline for the filing of certificates of candidacies.

=== Overview ===
		1	2	3	4	5	6	7	8	9	10	11	12	13	14	15	16	17	18	19	20	21	22	23	24
Before election	Senate bloc	Minority bloc			Majority bloc																			Min	
Before election	Party	‡	‡		‡		‡				‡	‡		‡	‡	‡			‡					‡	‡^
Before election	Coalition	Team PNoy												(guest)		UNA			Unaffiliated						
After election	Senate bloc																								
After election	Party							‡	‡	‡	‡	‡	‡	‡	‡	‡	‡	‡	‡^						
After election	Coalition	Team PNoy						Seats up												UNA		Unaffiliated			

Key:

- ‡ Seats up
- ‡^ Vacant seat up
- * Gained by a party from another party
- √ Held by the incumbent
- + Held by the same party with a new senator

=== Polls ===
Pollster	Date(s) administered	Sample size	Margin of error	Parties									Alliances			
Pollster	Date(s) administered	Sample size	Margin of error	Ak- bayan	LDP	LP	NP	NPC	PDP Laban	UNA	Ind.	Others	Maka- bayan	Team PNoy	UNA	Others
**Current**				0	1	4	5	2	2	3	2	4	4	**14**	3	6
October 5, 2012		Deadline of submitting candidacies.														
StratPOLLS	Oct 8–17, 2012	300	<3%, >4%	0	1	4	4 (1)	3	2	6	1 (1)	3	4	**13** (1)	9	4
Pulse Asia	Nov 23–29. 2012	1,200	±3%	0	1	3	5	3	2	6	1	3	4	**13**	9	4
SWS	Nov 29–Dec 3, 2012	1,200	±3%	0	0 (1)	3	5	3	2	7	1	3	4	12 (1)	10	4
January 7, 2013		United Nationalist Alliance releases its first TV advertisement.														
The Center	Jan 9–17, 2013	1,200	NA	0	0	3	5	3	2	6	2	3	5	**13**	10	4
SWS	Jan 17–19, 2013	1,200	±3%	0	0	3	5	3	2	6	2	3	5	**13**	10	4
Pulse Asia	Jan 19–30, 2012	1,800	±2%	0	1	3	5	3	2	6	1	3	4	**13**	9	4
January 28, 2013		United ticket of the Liberal Party, Nacionalista Party and the NPC is rebranded as "Team PNoy", and releases its first TV advertisement.														
February 12, 2013		Start of campaign period for the Senate election.														
SWS	Feb 15–17, 2013	1,200	±3%	0	1	4	5	2	2	5	2	3	5	**15** (1)	8 (1)	4
February 21, 2013		United Nationalist Alliance drops Francis Escudero, Loren Legarda and Grace Poe as guest candidates.														
Pulse Asia	Feb 24–28, 2013	1,800	±2%	0	0 (1)	4	5	3	2	5 (2)	2	3	5	**14** (1)	6 (2)	4
StratPOLLS	Mar 8–13, 2013	1,200	±3.5%	0	1	4	4 (1)	3	2	5 (1)	2	3	4 (1)	**14** (1)	6 (1)	4
SWS	Mar 15–17, 2013	1,200	±3%	0	1	4	5	2	2	5	2	3	5	**15** (1)	5 (1)	4
Pulse Asia	Mar 16–20, 2013	1,800	±2%	0	1	4	5	2 (1)	2	5 (2)	2	3	5	**15**	5 (3)	4
March 30, 2013		Start of campaign period for local positions. As this was a Good Friday, campaigning in earnest was not allowed to start until March 31.														
SWS	Apr 13–15, 2013	1,800	±2%	0	1	4	5	3	2	5	2	3	5	**15** (1)	6 (1)	4
Pulse Asia	Apr 20–22, 2013	1,800	±2%	0 (1)	1	4 (1)	5	2 (1)	2	5 (1)	2	3	5	**15** (2)	5 (2)	4
SWS	May 2–3, 2013	2,400	±2%	0	1	4 (1)	5	2 (1)	2	5 (1)	2	3	5	**15** (1)	5 (2)	4
Pulse Asia	May 10–11, 2013	1,800	±2%	0	1	4 (1)	5	2 (1)	2	5	2	3	5	**15** (1)	5 (1)	4
