= Candidates in the 2013 Philippine Senate election =

These are the people who, at one time or another, had been considered, announced, declined or withdrew their candidacy in the 2013 Philippine Senate election.

== Qualified candidates ==
These are the commission's approved candidates:

#	Nominee	Coalition	Party	Prior elected position(s)	Gender	Town/city registered
1	Samson Alcantara		Social Justice Society		Male	Quezon City
2	Sonny Angara	Team PNoy	LDP	Representative from Aurora's Lone District, 2004–2013	Male	Baler, Aurora
3	Bam Aquino	Team PNoy	Liberal		Male	Quezon City
4	Greco Belgica		DPP	Councilor from Manila's 6th district, 2004–2007	Male	Manila
5	Nancy Binay	UNA	UNA		Female	Makati
6	Teodoro Casiño	Makabayan	Makabayan	Representative of Bayan Muna party list, 2004–2013	Male	Makati
7	Alan Peter Cayetano	Team PNoy	Nacionalista	Councilor from Taguig's 1st district, 1992–1995; Representative from Taguig's 1st & Pateros's District, 1998–2007; Senator of the Philippines, 2007–2013	Male	Taguig
8	Tingting Cojuangco	UNA	UNA	Governor of Tarlac, 1992–1998	Female	Datu Odin Sinsuat, Maguindanao
9	Rizalito David		Ang Kapatiran		Male	Makati
10	John Carlos de los Reyes		Ang Kapatiran	Councilor of Olongapo, 1995–1998, 2007–2010	Male	Olongapo
11	JV Ejercito	UNA	UNA	Mayor of San Juan, 2001–2010; Representative from San Juan, 2010–2013	Male	San Juan
12	Jack Enrile	UNA	NPC	Representative from Cagayan's First District, 1998–2007, 2010–2013	Male	Aparri, Cagayan
13	Francis Escudero	Team PNoy	Independent	Representative from Sorsogon's 1st District, 1998–2007; Senator of the Philippines, 2007–2013	Male	Sorsogon City, Sorsogon
14	Baldomero Falcone		DPP		Male	Marikina
15	Richard J. Gordon	UNA	UNA	Delegate to the Constitutional Convention from Zambales, 1971–1972; Mayor of Olongapo, 1980–1986; Senator of the Philippines, 2004–2010	Male	Olongapo
16	Edward Hagedorn		Independent	Mayor of Puerto Princesa, 1992–2001, 2002–2013	Male	Puerto Princesa
17	Gregorio Honasan	UNA	UNA	Senator of the Philippines, 1995–2004, 2007–2013	Male	Marikina
18	Risa Hontiveros	Team PNoy	Akbayan	Representative of Akbayan party list, 2004–2010	Female	Quezon City
19	Loren Legarda	Team PNoy	NPC	Senator of the Philippines, 1998–2004, 2007–2013	Female	Malabon
20	Marwil Llasos		Ang Kapatiran	Sangguniang Kabataan chairman of Tagas, Daraga, Albay, 1995–1996	Male	Daraga, Albay
21	Ernesto Maceda	UNA	UNA	Councilor of Manila, 1959–1966; Senator of the Philippines, 1971–1972, 1987–1998	Male	Manila
22	Jamby Madrigal	Team PNoy	Liberal	Senator of the Philippines, 2004–2010	Female	Quezon City
23	Mitos Magsaysay	UNA	UNA	Representative from Zambales' First District, 2005–2013	Female	Olongapo
24	Ramon Magsaysay Jr.	Team PNoy	Liberal	Representative from Zambales' Lone District, 1965–1969; Senator of the Philippines, 1995–2007	Male	Muntinlupa
25	Ramon Montaño		Independent		Male	San Jose, Negros Oriental
26	Ricardo Penson		Independent		Male	Pasig
27	Koko Pimentel	Team PNoy	PDP–Laban	Senator of the Philippines, 2007–2013	Male	Cagayan de Oro
28	Grace Poe	Team PNoy	Independent		Female	San Juan
29	Christian Señeres		DPP	Representative of BUHAY Partylist, 2003–2007	Male	Las Piñas
30	Antonio Trillanes	Team PNoy	Nacionalista	Senator of the Philippines, 2007–2013	Male	Caloocan
31	Eddie Villanueva		Bangon Pilipinas		Male	Bocaue, Bulacan
32	Cynthia Villar	Team PNoy	Nacionalista	Representative from Las Piñas' Lone District, 2001–2010	Female	Las Piñas
33	Migz Zubiri	UNA	UNA	Representative from Bukidnon's Third District, 1998–2007; Senator of the Philippines, 2007–2011	Male	Maramag, Bukidnon

== Disqualified candidates/Withdrawn ==
The following individuals have submitted their certificates of candidacies to the Commission on Elections main office at Intramuros, Manila, but were not included in the official list of candidates.

Candidate	Party
Anicio Escosura	Independent
Daniel Magtira	Independent
Aeric Bernardino	Independent
Melchor Chavez	KBL
Salam Ed Lacanluisong Tagean, Sr.	Independent
Patrocinio Cailing	Independent
Juanito Donato	Independent
Oliver Lozano	KBL
Remelyn Ajel	Independent
Valeriano Nocon III	Independent
Catalino Dazo	Independent
Eduardo Syama-Sundar-Das Fernandez	Independent
Johnny Cris Sy	Independent
Ericson Eli Felix	Independent
Rebecca Santosidad	Independent
Victor Liwag	Independent
Orlando Suerte	Independent
Virgilio Galang	KBL
Leo Cadion	KBL
Aresnio Dimaya	Independent
Florentino Baguio	Independent
Leonardo Bula	Independent
Benjamin Handumon, Jr.	Independent
Rogelio Tomol	Independent
Norma Nueva	KBL
Roque Garay	Independent
Francis Leo Marcos	Independent
Rafael Cabrera	Independent
Cosme Soriano	Independent
Manuel Espinosa	Independent
Pepito Salangsang	Independent
Elena Mandap	Independent
Victorio Angelo Cadag	Independent
Byron Adriano Gorostiza	Independent
Nonato Sulibit	Independent
Generoso Factor	Independent
Severo Maluenda, Jr.	Independent
Wenceslao Pancho, Jr.	KBL
Rosario Bantolo	Independent
Alma Abella	KBL
Manuel Insigne	Independent
Carlito Ning	Independent
Edwin Jolongbayan	Independent
Victor Wood	KBL
Elizabeth Capular	Independent
Alfonso Talag, Jr.	Independent
Wendell Lope	Independent
Marlon Rirao	Independent
Manuel Po	Independent

== Withdrew candidacy ==
- Ruffy Biazon (Liberal), incumbent Commissioner of the Bureau of Customs and 2010 senatorial candidate. He was among the first four announced candidates of the Liberal Party. In the following weeks since, however, he was not certain of his candidacy. On September 25, he announced that he will not run for the Senate in 2013 and will stay instead at the BOC. His father, former Senator and incumbent Muntinlupa Rep. Rodolfo Biazon is seen as his replacement in the LP ticket.
- Joey de Venecia (PDP–Laban), businessman, whistleblower of the Philippine National Broadband Network controversy and 2010 senatorial candidate. He is among the first five bets of the UNA coalition.
- Gwendolyn Garcia (PDP–Laban/One Cebu), incumbent Governor of Cebu. She was included in the UNA ticket after she took her oath as member of PDP–Laban on May 25, 2012. On September 20, Vice President Jejomar Binay announced that Garcia will run for the House of Representatives instead.
- Win Gatchalian (NPC), incumbent Mayor of Valenzuela. He was on the shortlist of the LP-NP-NPC coalition ticket. He withdrew his Senatorial plans September 25.
- Alma Moreno (Lakas-CMD), actress, incumbent Councilor of Parañaque, and national president of the Philippine Councilors League. She announced her candidacy in May 2011, but withdrew on September 5 after it was announced that Moreno is suffering from multiple sclerosis.
- Danton Remoto, chairman emeritus of Ang Ladlad, an LGBT political party. On May 18, he announced his intention to run for the Senate. But, he did not file his certificate of candidacy at COMELEC.
- Lorenzo Tañada III (Liberal), incumbent Representative from Quezon and Deputy Speaker of the House of Representatives. He was included in the LP slate shortlist, but volunteered to withdraw from the race, according to Pres. Aquino III.
- Joel Villanueva, incumbent Secretary-General of the Technical Education and Skills Development Authority. He was among the first four announced candidates of the Liberal Party. On September 24, he announced that he was advised by Pres. Benigno Aquino III not to run for any elective position, and instead remain in TESDA for the time being.
- Israel Virgines (Bangon Pilipinas), stating that his party is giving way "to a more capable leader".

== Declined candidacy ==
The following individuals have been speculated as probable senatorial candidates, but have denied interest publicly.

- Florencio Abad, incumbent Secretary of Budget and Management
- Oscar V. Cruz, retired Archbishop of Lingayen-Dagupan
- Sara Duterte, incumbent Mayor of Davao City
- Gary Estrada, actor and incumbent Provincial Board member of Quezon
- Lani Mercado, incumbent Representative from Cavite chose to defend her seat in the House of Representatives.
- Leni Robredo, widow of former Interior and Local Government Secretary Jesse Robredo chose to run for Camarines Sur's 2nd district's seat in the House of Representatives
- Mar Roxas, incumbent Secretary of Department of the Interior and Local Government, former Senator, and 2010 vice-presidential candidate
- Adel Tamano, lawyer, talk show host, and 2010 senatorial candidate
- Gilbert Teodoro, former Secretary of National Defense and 2010 presidential candidate

== Prospective candidates ==
The following individuals have been speculated as probable senatorial candidates, but did not run:

=== Former senators ===
- Rodolfo Biazon, incumbent Representative from Muntinlupa, chose to defend his seat for Representative from Muntlnlupa's district instead

=== Others ===
- Neric Acosta, former Representative from Bukidnon and 2010 senatorial candidate
- Rodolfo Antonino, incumbent Representative from Nueva Ecija
- Kris Aquino, television host and actress
- Raul Bacalzo, retired Director General and former Chief of the Philippine National Police
- Ricky Carandang, incumbent Secretary of the Presidential Communications Development and Strategic Planning Office
- Leila de Lima, incumbent Secretary of Justice
- Mike Enriquez, GMA-7 news broadcaster
- Rodolfo Fariñas, incumbent Representative from Ilocos Norte
- Roilo Golez, incumbent Representative from Parañaque
- Edwin Lacierda, incumbent Presidential Spokesman
- Danilo Lim, incumbent Deputy Commissioner for Intelligence of the Bureau of Customs, retired brigadier general, and 2010 senatorial candidate
- Imee Marcos, incumbent Governor of Ilocos Norte, chose to run for the governorship of Ilocos Norte instead.
- Grace Padaca, former Governor of Isabela, was appointed commissioner of the Commission on Elections instead.
- Manuel L. Quezon III, incumbent Undersecretary of the Presidential Communications Development and Strategic Planning Office,
- Roman Romulo, incumbent Representative from Pasig. chose to defend his seat for Representative from Pasig's district instead.
- Joey Salceda, incumbent Governor of Albay
- Korina Sanchez, ABS-CBN news broadcaster
- Vic Sotto, Celebrity & Host
- Niel Tupas, Jr., incumbent Representative from Iloilo, chose to defend his seat for Representative from Iloilo's 5th district instead.
