= Kandidato =

Philippine television public affairs show

- Title card in 2013
- Also known as: Kandidato 2013: Senador
- Genre: Public affairs
- Presented by: Arnold Clavio; Malou Mangahas; Howie Severino
- Country of origin: Philippines
- Original language: Tagalog
- No. of episodes: 20

Production
- Camera setup: Multiple-camera setup
- Running time: 60 minutes
- Production company: GMA News and Public Affairs

Original release
- Network: GMA Network
- Release: March 3, 2010 – May 2, 2013

Kandidato (transl. candidate) is a Philippine television public affairs show broadcast by GMA Network. The show was focused on the 2010 Philippine presidential election and the 2013 Philippine Senate election. Hosted by Arnold Clavio, Malou Mangahas and Howie Severino, it premiered on March 3, 2010. The show concluded on May 2, 2013, with a total of 20 episodes.

== Hosts ==
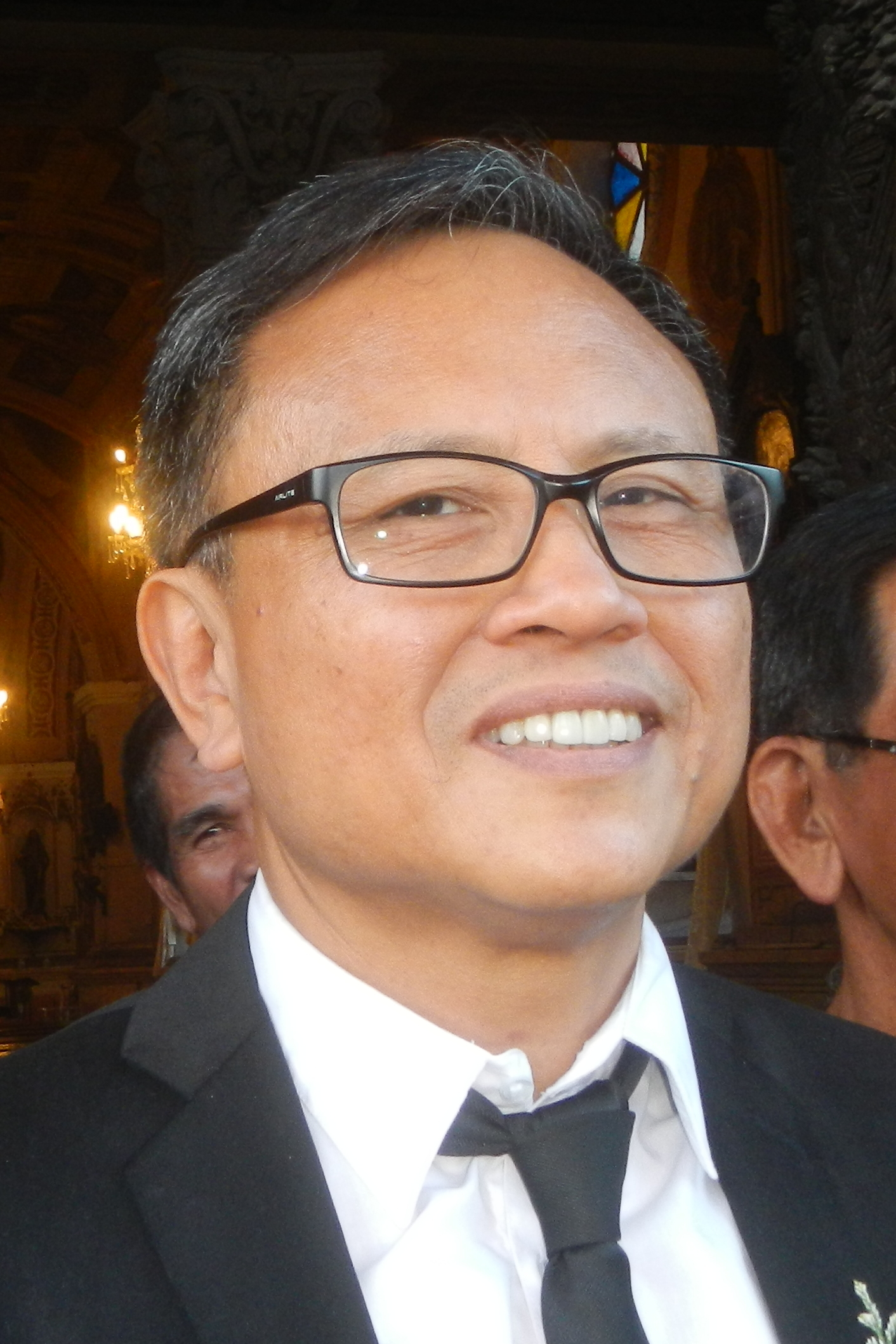
Howie Severino served as a host.

- Arnold Clavio
- Malou Mangahas
- Howie Severino

== Episodes ==
Kandidato episodes
No.	Title	Original release date
1	"Gilbert Teodoro"	March 3, 2010
2	"John Carlos de los Reyes"	March 10, 2010
3	"Dick Gordon"	March 17, 2010
4	"Joseph Estrada"	March 24, 2010
5	"Nicanor Perlas"	March 31, 2010
6	"Eddie Villanueva"	April 7, 2010
7	"Jamby Madrigal"	April 14, 2010
8	"Benigno Aquino III"	April 21, 2010
9	"Manny Villar"	April 28, 2010
10	"Huling Pagkilatis bago ang Eleksyon 2010" (transl. final clarification before the election)	May 5, 2010

Episodes of Kandidato 2013: Senador
Candidate	Original air date	No.
Sonny Angara (Team PNoy); Jamby Madrigal (Team PNoy); Mitos Magsaysay (UNA)	February 21, 2013	1
Francis Escudero (Team PNoy); Marwil Llasos (Ang Kapatiran); Eddie Villanueva (Bangon Pilipinas)	February 28, 2013	2
Bam Aquino (Team PNoy); JV Ejercito (UNA); Dick Gordon (UNA)	March 7, 2013	3
Loren Legarda (Team PNoy); Tingting Cojuangco (UNA); Rizalito David (Ang Kapatiran)	March 14, 2013	4
Risa Hontiveros (Team PNoy); Gregorio Honasan (UNA); Ricardo Penson (Independent)	March 21, 2013	5
Greco Belgica (DPP); Teodoro Casiño (Makabayan); Ramon Montaño (Independent)	April 4, 2013	6
Ramon Magsaysay Jr. (Team PNoy); John Carlos de los Reyes (Ang Kapatiran); Baldomero Falcone (DPP)	April 11, 2013	7
Grace Poe (Team PNoy); Edward Hagedorn (Independent); Samson Alcantara (Social Justice Society)	April 18, 2013	8
Jack Enrile (UNA); Ernesto Maceda (UNA); Christian Señeres (DPP)	April 25, 2013	9
Koko Pimentel (Team PNoy); Migz Zubiri (UNA)	May 2, 2013	10

== Ratings ==
According to AGB Nielsen Philippines' Mega Manila household television ratings, the final episode of Kandidato scored a 5% rating.
