= Rizalito David =

Filipino politician (born 1963)

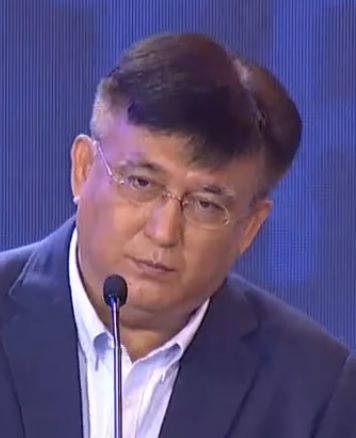
- David at a COMELEC debate, 2022

Personal details
- Born: Rizalito Yap David; January 12, 1963 (age 63) Tondo, Manila
- Education: University of the Philippines Los Baños
- Occupation: Radio commentator

Rizalito Yap David (born January 12, 1963) is a Filipino politician and radio commentator. He entered University of the Philippines Los Baños and was a staff of an election tandem, Senators Francisco Tatad and Robert Jaworski, and Congressman Hernando Perez. He ran for senator in 2010 and 2013, gaining 49th out of 61 places with a total of 451,089 votes and 30th out of 33 places with 1,035,971 votes, respectively. In August 2015, he filed a complaint against Senator Grace Poe, which was rejected by the Senate Electoral Tribunal, but it caused the short disqualification of Poe from the 2016 Philippine presidential election. Since then, he ran for president and vice president two times: in the 2016 elections, where he was declared a nuisance candidate, and the 2022 Philippine vice-presidential election, where he gained 9th (last) with 56,711 (0.11 percent) votes.

== Early life and career ==
Rizalito Yap David was born on January 12, 1963, in Tondo, Manila. Tina Santos of the Philippine Daily Inquirer said that David was born in a "broken home," with David stating that his grandfather, Tiburcio David, was among the greatest influences in his life. When he was 17, he joined the underground movement, fighting for a "just and humane society based on ideology" according to Santos, and two years later, he reportedly was a participant in the "military’s order of battle." He then entered the University of the Philippines Los Baños, serving as the research assistant and instructor at the Program on Environmental Sciences and Management. He graduated with a degree in environmental studies and sociology. He worked at the Department of Environment and Natural Resources, where he was the development management officer and eventually the chief of the Strategic Planning and Policy Studies Office. He subsequently became the chief of the Research and Monitoring Staff of the Liberal Party-PDP–Laban tandem in the 1992 Philippine general election. He then became the executive assistant and secretary or the supervising legislative staff officer of Senator Francisco Tatad. He later was hired as the consultant on political affairs and head of the political operations for Mindanao for House of Representatives Deputy Speaker Hernando Perez in 1997 and as the head executive assistant and concurrent director for political affairs for Senator Robert Jaworski from 1998 to 2004. During his stints under Tatad, Perez, and Jaworski, he worked on major environmental laws. He thanked Tatad for improving his intellectual discipline and Jaworski for instilling his "never say die" attitude towards work.

== Political candidacies ==
=== Senate runs ===
In November 2009, David filed his certificate of candidacy for the 2010 Philippine Senate election under Ang Kapatiran along with six other senatorial candidates, presidential candidate John Carlos de los Reyes, and vice presidential candidate Dominador Chipeco Jr. By December 15, a list of 58 approved senatorial candidates, including David, was released. Three more candidates were accepted, leading to a total of 61. David opposed charter change and had a net worth of ₱100,000 by that time, the party garnering the support of Catholic bishops and leaders of other churches. In the overall results, he placed 49th out of 61 places with a total of 451,089 votes, not placing in the top 12 and therefore losing. On October 4, 2012, David filed his certificate of candidacy for the 2013 Philippine Senate election under Ang Kapatiran along with de los Reyes and lawyer Marwil Llasos in a coalition named "Tatlo Kontra Trapo" (transl. Three Against Trapo). They marketed themselves as an alternative to the two main running coalitions in the elections, adding that the negative reactions against political dynasties and celebrities were a sign that "Filipinos have had enough." On October 12, the candidacies of 27 people were accepted, including all three Ang Kapatiran candidates, and five more candidates were added on October 26, bringing the total to 32. The total number of candidates in the election was 33. David was one of the 14 senatorial aspirants that participated in "The Rundown," a senatorial debate held in the University of the Philippines Diliman on February 7. In the event, David had a debate against panelist and activist Carlos Celdran over church teachings. In an interview with the Philippine Daily Inquirer, David said that the party may not be visible unlike other parties but said they were "doing [our] homework" to win. He added that he ran again because he was on a mission, saying that he kept on fighting. If he was elected, he planned to place his Catholic faith in the center of governance and reflect it in laws and programs. David lost, gaining 30th out of 33 places with 1,035,971 votes, receiving the highest number of votes in a region from Metro Manila (133,105).

=== Presidential and vice-presidential runs ===
On October 12, 2015, David filed his certificate of candidacy for president in the 2016 Philippine presidential election under Ang Kapatiran alongside his running mate Albert Alba. In his speech, he said that he would espouse Catholic ways in governance and would not file a disqualification case against Poe if she runs for president. The Commission on Elections (COMELEC) declared David a nuisance candidate on December 9, with the COMELEC Second Division stating that David misrepresented himself and, with his current job, could not do a national campaign. David filed a motion for reconsideration in response, stating that there was no rule in the Constitution or the Omnibus Election Code that stated a candidate has to have financial capability for a national campaign. In January 2016, the Supreme Court of the Philippines (SC) upheld David's disqualification from the presidential polls. The motion for reconsideration was rejected by the SC on February 4, leading David to request the SC to reverse its decision. In March 2016, the SC ruled with finality over disqualifying David. He ran for vice president in the 2022 Philippine presidential election under the Democratic Party of the Philippines alongside presidential candidate Jose Montemayor Jr. Their proclamation rally was held at a condominium unit in Pasay on February 9, with prayer and worship songs. David attended the CNN Philippines vice presidential debate on February 26, the COMELEC Pilipinas Debate in Sofitel Philippine Plaza Manila on March 20, and was interviewed in the COMELEC-Kapisanan ng mga Brodkaster ng Pilipinas Pilipinas Forum Series. Although David was the running mate of Montemayor, David supported presidential candidate and former Vice President Leni Robredo to win against main candidate Bongbong Marcos in their Pilipinas Forum episode with Montemayor, also endorsing Vice Presidential Candidate Tito Sotto. David wanted price controls for the rising fuel prices due to the Russo-Ukrainian war and would keep watch on Marcos if he won the presidency. David gained 9th or last place with 56,711 (0.11 percent) votes while Montemayor Jr. gained 60,592 (0.11 percent) votes.

== David v. Poe ==
David filed a complaint to unseat Senator Grace Poe on August 6, 2015, before the Senate Electoral Tribunal (SET) for allegedly failing to meet residency and citizenship requirements for office. The Tribunal rejected the complaint 5-4, with all five opposing votes being Senators and three of the supporting votes being members of the SC. A motion for reconsideration filed by David to reverse the ruling by SET was rejected on December 3, 2015. On December 23, 2015, COMELEC disqualified Poe from running as president in the 2016 elections for failing to meet the 10-year residency requirement, but she said she would appeal the disqualification to the SC, which issued a temporary restraining order preventing the disqualification. David then filed an appeal with the SC, stating that there was no proof Poe was of Filipino blood. At the court's request, the Office of the Solicitor General submitted an opinion on the SET ruling to the SC on January 4, 2016, which supported the rejection.

== Electoral history ==
Electoral history of Rizalito David
Year	Office	Party	Votes received				Result
Year	Office	Party	Total	%	P.	Swing	Result
2010	Senator of the Philippines	Ang Kapatiran	451,089	1.32%	49th	—N/a	Lost
2013	Senator of the Philippines	Ang Kapatiran	1,035,971	2.58%	30th	—N/a	Lost
2022	Vice President of the Philippines	Democratic Party of the Philippines	56,711	0.11%	9th	—N/a	Lost
