= Team PNoy =

Defunct political coalition in the Philippines

- Leader: Benigno Aquino III
- Senate leader: Franklin Drilon (Note: Member of Liberal (seat not up))
- Founded: April 9, 2012; 14 years ago
- Dissolved: July 31, 2015; 11 years ago
- Succeeded by: Koalisyon ng Daang Matuwid
- Headquarters: Metro Manila
- Political position: Big tent
- Coalition members: Liberal; Akbayan; Nacionalista; NUP; NPC; LDP; PDP–Laban
- Colors: Yellow
- Slogan: Mga tunay na tuwid sa daang matuwid ('The truly righteous people on the straight path')

Team PNoy, formerly known as the LP–Akbayan–NPC–NP–LDP Coalition, was a political umbrella coalition in the Philippines, originally formed to support the administration-backed senatorial line-up for the 2013 Philippine Senate election. Team PNoy is composed mostly of supporters of then-president Benigno Aquino III, nicknamed PNoy. The coalition is composed of the Liberal Party, the Nacionalista Party, the Nationalist People's Coalition, the Laban ng Demokratikong Pilipino, the Akbayan Citizens' Action Party, the PDP–Laban and the National Unity Party.

Its official slogan was Mga tunay na tuwid sa daang matuwid ('The truly righteous people on the straight path').

== History ==
=== 2013 elections ===
The Liberal (LP) was open to creating coalitions or alliances with other parties for the 2013 general election as long as the politicians had aligning principles. Secretary of Budget and Management Florencio Abad said on April 7, 2012 that it was too early to make conclusions. Two days later, the Liberals revealed 14 names as potential candidates on their ticket, including candidates that were being considered on the United Nationalist Alliance (UNA) ticket, which meant there were common names on both tickets.

In April 2012, the Nacionalista (NP) was choosing between the LP and the UNA tickets, with party Secretary-General Alan Peter Cayetano saying that it was too early to decide on such matters. The verdict in the impeachment of Renato Corona could affect their decision.

On May 17, 2012, Aquino revealed the party's four certain senatorial bets, namely Aurora Representative Sonny Angara, TESDA chairman Joel Villanueva and 2010 senatorial candidates Risa Hontiveros and Ruffy Biazon. All four, were still considering their options to run for Senator. On 28 June 2012, party vice chairman Senator Franklin Drilon announced the candidacy of former Senator Ramon Magsaysay Jr.

Senator Francis Escudero, who formerly campaigned for the Nationalist People's Coalition (NPC)'s presidential nomination in 2010 before resigning from the party and withdrawing from the race abruptly, said he believed that the NPC and the Liberals "are in coalition with one another".

It was announced on July 5, 2012 that the ruling Liberal, the NPC and the Nacionalista would most likely field a common senatorial ticket in the May 2013 elections. A meeting between Noynoy Aquino and Manuel Villar resulted in an agreement to coalesce for the 2013 elections and details such as local candidates would be dealt with upon on further meetings. Senator and Liberal vice chairman Franklin Drilon cautioned that the agreement was "not yet sealed" as the distribution of slots in the ticket would also be a factor. The Nacionalista had already endorsed four candidates in Senators Antonio Trillanes and Alan Peter Cayetano and Representatives Robert "Ace" Barbers and Cynthia Villar.

However, NPC official and Senator Tito Sotto in September said that the three-party coalition might not be pursued as the determination of candidates at the local level remained a stumbling block in the formation of the coalition. The NPC had more local officials than the Liberal and the Nacionalista. Meanwhile, Representative Mark Villar of the Nacionalista said that they would stay put with their coalition agreement with the Liberal and that most issues had already been resolved.

The President's cousin Bam Aquino and Jamby Madrigal, one of the defeated presidential candidates in 2010, were sworn in as Liberal members. On 1 October 2012, the President announced the administration coalition's nominees in a speech at Club Filipino. The ruling coalition, aside from the Liberal, the NPC and the Nacionalista, included the Laban ng Demokratikong Pilipino (LDP) and Akbayan.

In October 2012, Senators Francis Escudero, Loren Legarda and Fernando Poe Jr.'s daughter, former MTRCB Chair Grace Poe, formally joined the proclamation rally as independent candidates. The three independent candidates were also adopted by the UNA coalition.

According to Joseph Emilio Abaya, the ruling party's spokesman, the independent candidates did not intend to campaign with the UNA, which had also adopted them. However, when asked with whom she will campaign, Legarda said: "I will campaign with the Filipino people".

On January 26, 2013, it was announced that the administration ticket would be called Team PNoy. It is a play on the words pinoy, (an informal term used to denote the Filipino people) and P-Noy, the administration's preferred reference to President Aquino, whose nickname is Noynoy. Angara said that "we decided to use 'PNoy' to send the message that this campaign is for all Filipinos". The coalition released its first TV advertisement the next day with the Team PNoy spelling.

=== 2016 elections ===
A few days after his final State of the Nation Address, President Aquino endorsed Secretary of the Interior Mar Roxas as the standard bearer of his administration in the 2016 general election. Meanwhile, Poe and Escudero ran as independents for presidency and vice presidency respectively, while Cayetano ran as Rodrigo Duterte's vice presidential nominee. Team PNoy was replaced by Koalisyon ng Daang Matuwid, now composed of Liberal and Akbayan.

== Coalition members ==
=== Mainstream party members ===
- Liberal Party (LP / Liberal)
- Laban ng Demokratikong Pilipino (LDP)
- Nationalist People's Coalition (NPC–Legarda wing)
- Nacionalista Party (NP / Nacionalista–Villar wing)
- National Unity Party (NUP–Barzaga wing)
- Akbayan Citizens' Action Party (Akbayan)
- Partido Demokratiko Pilipino–Lakas ng Bayan (PDP–Laban – Pimentel wing)

== Senatorial slate ==
Candidate	Party	Last position in government	Relatives in government	Elected
Sonny Angara	LDP	Incumbent congressman from Aurora's lone district (since 2004)	Senator Edgardo Angara (father) and Aurora governor Bellaflor Angara-Castillo (aunt)	Yes
Bam Aquino	Liberal	Former chairman of the National Youth Commission (2003–2006)	President Benigno Aquino III (cousin), President Corazon Aquino (aunt), Senator Benigno Aquino Jr. (uncle), Senator Agapito Aquino (uncle), Senator Teresa Aquino-Oreta (aunt)	Yes
Alan Peter Cayetano	Nacionalista	Incumbent Senator (since 2007)	Senator Pia Cayetano (sister), Senator Rene Cayetano (father) and Taguig mayor Lani Cayetano (wife)	Yes
Francis Escudero	Independent	Incumbent Senator (since 2007)	Congressman from Sorsogon Salvador Escudero (father)	Yes
Risa Hontiveros	Akbayan	Former congresswoman from Akbayan (2004–2010)	None	No
Loren Legarda	NPC	Incumbent Senator (since 2007)	Batangas governor Antonio Leviste (annulled)	Yes
Jamby Madrigal	Liberal	Former Senator (2004–2010)	Chief Justice José Abad Santos (grandfather) and Senator Manuel Collantes (uncle)	No
Ramon Magsaysay Jr.	Liberal	Former Senator (1995–2007)	President Ramon Magsaysay (father), Zambales governor Vicente Magsaysay (cousin) and congresswoman from Zambales Mitos Magsaysay (niece-in-law)	No
Koko Pimentel	PDP–Laban	Incumbent Senator (since 2007)	Senator Aquilino Pimentel Jr. (father)	Yes
Grace Poe	Independent	Former chairwoman of the Movie and Television Review and Classification Board (2010–2012)	None	Yes
Antonio Trillanes	Nacionalista	Incumbent Senator (since 2007)	None	Yes
Cynthia Villar	Nacionalista	Former congresswoman from Las Piñas lone district (2001–2010)	Senator Manuel Villar (husband), congressman from Las Piñas Mark Villar (son), congressman from Las Piñas Filemon Aguilar (father) and Las Piñas mayor Vergel Aguilar (brother)	Yes

== Election results ==
9 out of 12 candidates won the possible 12 seats in the Senate:

- Sonny Angara
- Bam Aquino
- Alan Peter Cayetano
- Francis Escudero
- Loren Legarda
- Koko Pimentel
- Grace Poe
- Antonio Trillanes
- Cynthia Villar

== See also ==
- Koalisyon ng Daang Matuwid, the successor coalition in the 2016 elections
- United Nationalist Alliance, the main rival of Team PNoy in the 2013 elections
- Elections in the Philippines
