= Manuel Collantes =

Filipino diplomat

Manuel G. Collantes
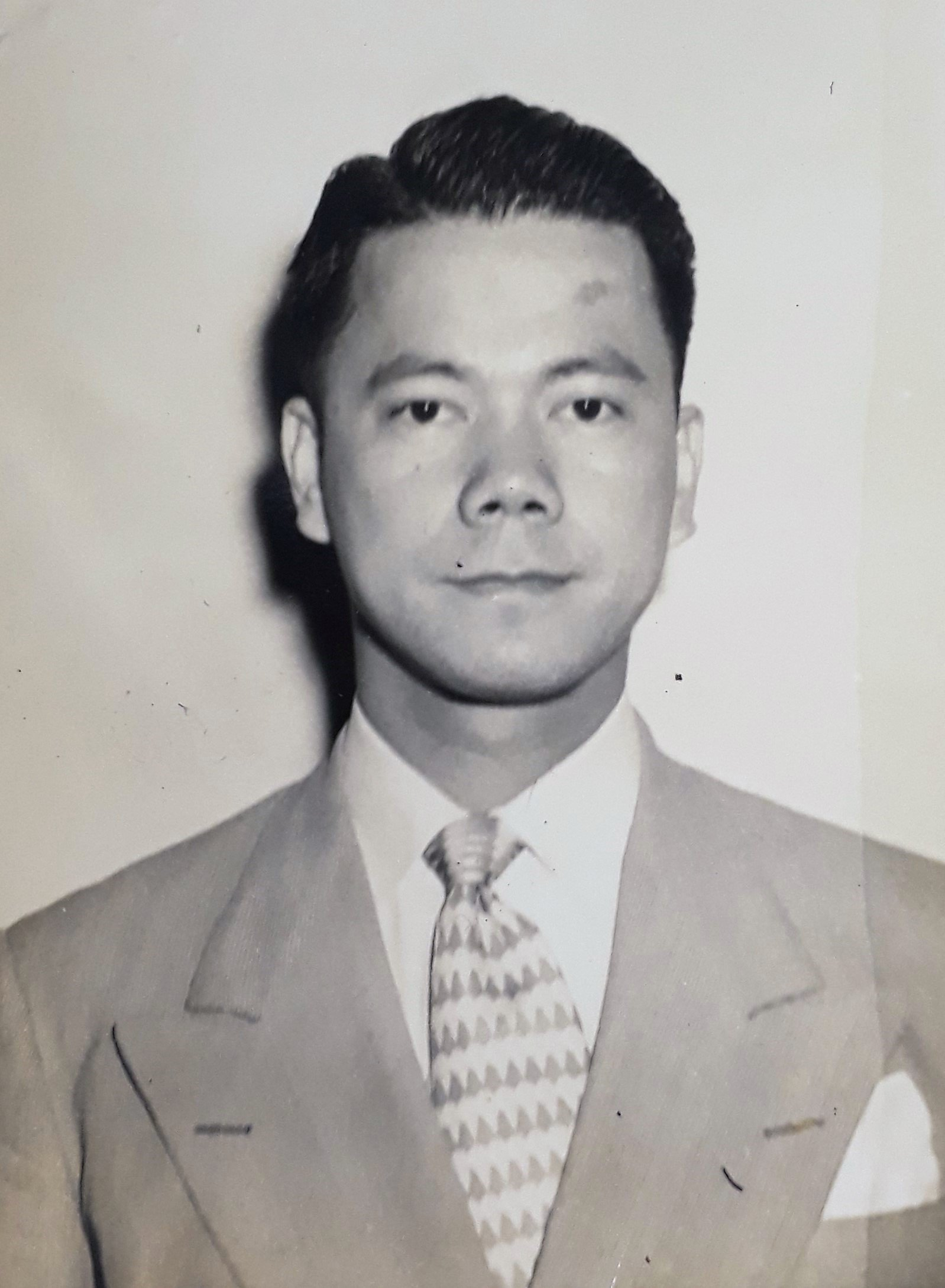

Minister of Foreign Affairs
- In office January 14, 1984 – June 30, 1984
- President: Ferdinand Marcos
- Preceded by: Carlos P. Romulo
- Succeeded by: Arturo Tolentino

Mambabatas Pambansa (Assemblyman) from Batangas
- In office June 30, 1984 – March 25, 1986 Serving with Jose Laurel Jr., Hernando Perez, and Rafael Recto

Personal details
- Born: August 20, 1917 Tanauan, Batangas, Philippine Islands
- Died: May 28, 2009 (aged 91) Philippines
- Resting place: Madrigal Mausoleum, Ayala Alabang, Muntinlupa
- Party: KBL
- Spouse: Consuelo Madrigal

Manuel G. Collantes (August 20, 1917 – May 28, 2009) was a Filipino diplomat, lawyer and businessman. He served as the country's acting Minister of Foreign Affairs in 1984.

== Early life and education ==
Collantes was raised in Tanauan, Batangas. He received his law degree from Far Eastern University in 1940, and passed the bar exam later that same year.

== Career ==
He began his career by working as an assistant attorney at the Claro M. Recto law office for a short period. He also taught diplomacy and international law, as well as parliamentary practice at Far Eastern University.

Collantes held a variety of positions with the Department of Foreign Affairs during his career as a diplomat. These included Aide-de-Camp to the Secretary of Foreign Affairs to Deputy Minister for Foreign Affairs and legal assistant secretary.

Collantes was appointed acting Minister for Foreign Affairs for a short period in 1984 during the government of President Ferdinand Marcos.

=== Assemblyman (1984–1986) ===
In 1984, he was elected as an assemblyman for the province of Batangas. On July 30, 1984, Collantes, despite being a party member of Marcos's Kilusang Bagong Lipunan, voted against the reelection of Prime Minister Cesar Virata, which is credited as the first time a ruling party member voted against a party position. By October, Collantes participated in a call by business leaders such as Jaime Ongpin to hold a rally against the Marcos government, in which they expressed solidarity with the "parliament of the streets".

"We can safeguard our independence and ensure our redemption from difficulties only through self-reliance and hard work, based on an ideology that is truly our own. This ideology provides the foundation for national unity. It is based on the pillars of nationalism and identity, unity, social justice, barangay (grassroot) participatory democracy, self-reliance, freedom of belief, and internationalism and adherence to the ideals of the United Nations.

— Excerpt from Collantes' Independence Day message, June 1984

== Post-EDSA activities ==
Collantes' tenure as Batangas assemblyman for the Regular Batasang Pambansa ended upon the parliament's abolition after the People Power Revolution in February 1986.

In July 1986, Collantes participated in a coup attempt led by Arturo Tolentino at the Manila Hotel against the Corazon Aquino administration, being named Tolentino's "foreign affairs minister". A year later, Collantes ran for congressman of Batangas' third district, but was defeated by Milagros "Lally" Laurel-Trinidad after he placed second in the vote tally; the only town where he had more votes than Laurel was Balete. However, he earned more votes than former Batangas governor Antonio Leviste.

Collantes was a member of the board of directors of the United Pulp and Paper Company, Inc. (UPPCI) until his death in 2009. In 1999, UPPCI established a second paper mill, then the largest in the Philippines, as a joint project between Phinma and the Thailand-based Siam Cement Group; by 2004, Phinma divested some of its operations and sold UPPCI to Siam Cement.

== Personal life ==
Collantes met his wife, Consuelo Madrigal, in Washington, D.C. in 1949 while he was working as the second secretary and consul at the Embassy of the Philippines in Washington, D.C. The couple married in the 1970s. Former Senator Jamby Madrigal is his niece through his wife.

Manuel Collantes died of cardiopulmonary arrest on May 28, 2009, at the age of 91. His body lay in state at their family home in Forbes Park, Makati. He was buried at the Madrigal Mausoleum in Ayala Alabang, Muntinlupa, following a funeral mass.
