= 2013 Senate of the Philippines funds controversy =

The Senate of the Philippines was stirred in a political controversy over the use of the operating expenses of senators, known as the Maintenance and Other Operating Expenses (MOOE). A report on the Philippine Daily Inquirer on 9 January 2013, which noted that Senate President Juan Ponce Enrile authorized the release of additional operating expenses of almost PHP 30 million during the Christmas season. The controversy has led to the auditing of the finances of the Senate by the Commission on Audit and abrupt motion to declare the vacancy of the Senate leadership by Enrile himself.

== Philippine Daily Inquirer report ==
A report made by the Philippine Daily Inquirer on 9 January 2013, stated that Senate President Juan Ponce Enrile authorized the dispersal of additional operating expenses as a cash bonus to senators amounting to PHP30 million. Although all senators were to receive PHP 1.6 million, the authorization applied to all but four senators, namely Senate Minority Floor Leader Alan Peter Cayetano, Pia Cayetano, Miriam Defensor Santiago and Antonio Trillanes IV who received PHP 250,000. According to Enrile, the additional operating expenses came from the funds designated to the current vacant seat of then Senator Benigno Aquino III who assumed the presidency in 2010.
