= Baldomero Falcone =

Filipino businessman and aspiring politician

Personal details
- Born: September 19, 1944 (age 82) Hindang, Leyte
- Party: DPP
- Spouse: Alice L. Falcone
- Education: Sacred Heart Seminary (BA); University of San Carlos (MA); Asian Institute of Management (MBA); University of the Philippines Diliman (Ph.D)
- Profession: Business consultant

Baldomero "Bal" Falcone (born September 18, 1944) is a Filipino business consultant and politician who ran twice as a candidate for Senator under the newly accredited Democratic Party of the Philippines but lost.

== Early life ==
Baldomero Falcone was born on September 18, 1944, in Hindang, Leyte.

== Personal life ==
He is married to Alice L. Falcone. Baldomero Falcone lives in Marikina, Metro Manila.

== Education ==
- B.A., Sacred Heart Seminary
- M.A. Philosophy University of San Carlos, Cebu
- MBA, Asian Institute of Management
- Ph.D Candidate. Philosophy, University of the Philippines, Diliman. Quezon City

== Some Past Achievements ==
- Co-founded with graduate professors Russ Allen and Dr. Vic Ordonez the Ford Foundation-funded Master of Arts in Educational Administration at the Philippine Normal University
- Former Cebu Professor: SouthWestern University (SWU), University of the Visayas (UV) University of Cebu (UC)
- Mobilized his townmates in Metro Manila to have a giant Statue of their patron St Michael Archangel sculpted by International Sculptor Ed Castrillo, installed the *Artistic masterpiece in the town plaza of Hindang Leyte, creating a prideful tourist attraction of the town.
- Authored the book "Christian Economics: The Philippines' Developmental Ideology" (published 1984) Authored the book "A Whip of Roses to Rouse a Sleeping Philippine Giant" (still unpublished)
- Co-founded Consultasia Management Services Inc., under this firm put up two pioneering tourist beach resorts, one in Agoo, La Union, the other in Lingayen, Pangasinan
- Co-founded FG Finance Company, a lending company, with 12 branches in the country; among the few first in the industry to provide no-collateral loans to employees. *Packaged the recapitalization of MICC (Millennium Industrial Commercial Corp.) to become one of the largest stock firms in the country.
- Seconded the late Dr.(Fr.) Ernesto G. Ramos Ph.D and his brother Luis G. Ramos in the organization of DPP / the Democratic Party of the Philippines/the Democratic Party of the Poor.

== Current Involvements ==
- National President: DPP or Democratic Party of the Philippines/Democratic Party of the Poor, a new national political Party represented in all the country's 17 regions, with aspirations to empower the poor towards sufficiency through the election of leaders with hearts and minds genuinely for the poor. Bal Falcone has just been nominated by the DPP (and humbly accepted) as its Senatoriable Candidate to the coming National Elections.
- Executive Director: Sagip Bansa Filipinas Foundation Inc., an NGO dedicated to helping provide jobs and houses and lots to the poorest of the poor in Philippine society. Starting last year to put into actual action this advocacy, Sagip Bansa with the acquiescence of the Spartan Mining and Development Corporation of DPP's Chairman Luis G. Ramos has provided decent and well paying jobs (hand-magnetizing iron sand) to more than a thousand displaced Aetas around Mt. Pinatubo while preparing to provide jobs and homes (200 m^{2} lots with 50 m^{2} houses for each family) to the thousands of families and informal settlers of Metro Manila (Smokey Mountain, Payatas, Farola, North Triangle, Baseco etc.) collocating them decently in Brgy. Villar, Botolan Zambales. In this regard, he has led efforts to the securitization of this project which will create a new city (tentatively captioned "Magnificat City") of the poor, for the poor, and by the poor empowering themselves towards decent sufficiency, while at the same time restoring Manila to its original grandeur, of which great Filipino writer Nick Joaquin constantly exulted.
- President: Millennium Industrial Commercial Corporation (MICC), a Cebu-based company.
- Vice-President: Global Interphase Security Services Provider Inc. (or GISSPI), a Filipino firm dedicated to providing good foreign assignments to retired officers, soldiers and army men; together with ADI / Arch. Designers Inc., and Nippon Steel of Japan projects the transformation of Laguna Lake and surrounding areas into key tourism towns and destinations worthy of global admiration.

== Special Skills ==
- Securitization: the ability/special know-how (he learned from special tutors here and abroad) to create Asset Pool Trusts with selected banks to raise from the Trust departments of banks and high-net-worth individuals and juridical entities critical capital funds for viable projects through domestic and international bond flotation enhanced by third party guarantors/ insurers. (Unknown to many, the combined trust money in the Trust Department of Philippine Banks now amounts to close to Three (3) Trillions Pesos. The major monetary instrument / access tool to these inefficiently and unequitably utilized funds (a luxurious plaything of the few rich, comfortable and powerful) is Securitization. Bal Cordero Falcone can initiate the Securitization of Viable Projects in each city and province to increase the provincial revenues (besides its IRA) as well as solve the unemployment problem of each province city and town.
