= Samson Alcantara =

Filipino lawyer and law professor (1935–2014)

Personal details
- Born: May 14, 1935 Bangued, Abra, Philippine Islands
- Died: December 26, 2014 (aged 79) St. Luke's Medical Center – Quezon City, Philippines
- Party: Social Justice Society (2012–2014); Abakada Guro (2003–2010)
- Spouse: Evelyn Baula
- Education: Manuel L. Quezon University (LL.B)
- Occupation: Lawyer, Professor
- Profession: Lawyer

Samson S. Alcantara (May 14, 1935 – December 26, 2014) was a Filipino lawyer and law professor. He was also the national president of the Social Justice Society, a political party accredited by the Commission on Elections, as well as the founding chairman and president of the ABAKADA-GURO partylist, a partylist group representing teachers. Alcantara was also a candidate for the 2013 Philippine Senate elections under the Social Justice Society.

== Education ==
Alcantara finished his law studies at the Manuel L. Quezon University School of Law in 1957. Later that same year, he placed third in the Philippine Bar Examination.

== Law career ==
Alcantara began working as a law professor in 1967, specializing in political law and labor law. He served as a law professor for the University of Santo Tomas, the Manuel L. Quezon University, the Pamantasan ng Lungsod ng Maynila, the University of the East, and the New Era University.

== ABAKADA GURO Partylist ==
In 2003, Alcantara founded the Advocates and Adherents of Social Justice for School Teachers and Allied Workers (AASJS), a party-list organization composed of academic and non-academic personnel of educational institution which aims to initiate educational reforms for all levels. It participated in the party-list election in 2004, but failed to win a seat in Congress. Soon after, it changed its name to the ABAKADA GURO Partylist. Under the new name, the group succeeded in winning a congressional seat in the 2007 party-list election, with journalist Jonathan A. Dela Cruz serving as its representative.

=== Term-sharing controversy ===
In January 2010, ABAKADA gave a press release stating that Alcantara would replace Dela Cruz as its party-list representative in Congress. The announcement came as a result of Dela Cruz's supposed resignation on December 31, 2009, in accordance with a term-sharing agreement between him and Alcantara. However, Dela Cruz reiterated that he is still the organization's representative, adding that the agreement was not approved by the members of ABAKADA.

Later that year, Alcantara, along with a few members of the party, filed a petition against Dela Cruz before the Supreme Court. In the petition, Alcantara et al. asked the Supreme Court to remove Dela Cruz as party-list representative of ABAKADA and to declare him as the lawful representative of the group. The petition was junked on April 17, 2012, since the contested term had already expired, making its petition moot and academic.

== 2013 Senate candidacy ==
Alcantara filed his candidacy for senator in the 2013 elections on October 4, 2012.

In December 2012, Alcantara filed a petition before the Supreme Court to stop the airing of television commercials of five government officials who are also running for senator in the upcoming election. In the petition, he stated that these officials acted against ethical standards expected from elected officials and violated "the letter and spirit" of the 1987 Constitution. Those named in the petition included Senator Alan Peter Cayetano, Aurora Representative Sonny Angara, San Juan Representative JV Ejercito, Cagayan Representative Jack Enrile, and Puerto Princesa City Mayor Edward Hagedorn.

== Death ==
He died on December 26, 2014, due to a massive stroke.
