= Jamby Madrigal =

Filipina politician

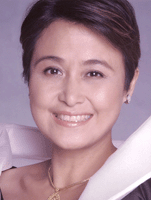
- Official portrait, 2007

Senator of the Philippines
- In office June 30, 2004 – June 30, 2010

Presidential Adviser for Children's Affairs
- In office 1999–2001
- President: Joseph Estrada; Gloria Macapagal Arroyo

Undersecretary of Social Welfare and Development
- In office June 30, 1992 – June 30, 1998
- President: Fidel Ramos

Personal details
- Born: Maria Ana Consuelo Abad Santos Madrigal; April 26, 1958 (age 68) Manila, Philippines
- Party: Independent (until 2001; 2009–2012; 2015–present)
- Other political affiliations: Liberal (2012–2015); PDP–Laban (2007–2009); LDP (2001–2007)
- Spouse: Eric Jean Valade (m. 2002)
- Relations: José Abad Santos (grandfather); Pedro Abad Santos (granduncle); Vicente Madrigal (grandfather); Pacita Madrigal-Warns (aunt)
- Education: Santa Clara University (BEcon); Yale University (MA)
- Occupation: Civil servant
- Profession: Politician

Maria Ana Consuelo Madrigal de Valade (born April 26, 1958), better known as Jamby Madrigal, is a Filipina politician and businesswoman. She was elected as a senator in the 2004 elections. After only one term, she ran for the presidency in the 2010 elections and lost.

== Early life and career ==
Jamby was born in Manila, Philippines on April 26, 1958, to Antonio Madrigal y Paterno (1918–2006) and Amanda Abad-Santos y Teopaco. She is the granddaughter of the former Supreme Court Chief Justice José Abad-Santos of San Fernando, Pampanga. Her grand uncle – pre-Commonwealth Assemblyman Pedro Abad Santos – founded the Socialist Party of the Philippines.

Her paternal grandfather was billionaire businessman and Senator Vicente Madrigal of Ligao, Albay. Her aunt, Pacita Madrigal-Warns, was a Senator during the Quezon and Magsaysay administrations and was the first administrator of the Social Welfare Administration, the predecessor of today's Department of Social Welfare and Development (DSWD). Her late uncle and aunt were former Acting Minister of Foreign Affairs Manuel Collantes and heiress Consuelo "Chito" Madrigal.

In addition to her work for her numerous foundations, in 2003 she became the spokesperson for the youth-based Kontra Pulitika Movement (KPM), which champions education, protection of the environment, and economic empowerment through livelihood programs.

She acted in a movie on the life of Luis Taruc, the Kapampangan founder of the Hukbo ng Bayan Laban sa mga Hapon (Hukbalahap). Ka Luis was the protégé of her grandfather and great uncle, the Abad Santos brothers. In the film, ‘Anak Pawis’, she portrays her grandmother, Amanda Teopaco.

Madrigal obtained a bachelor's degree in economics from the Santa Clara University and a master's in development economics from Yale University, both in the United States.

== Political career ==
In October 1999, President Joseph Estrada created the Office of the Presidential Adviser for Children's Affairs and appointed Madrigal to head this office. She later unsuccessfully ran for senator in 2001 under the Puwersa ng Masa opposition coalition. She organized the First National Summit for Children in Malacañang Palace on October 26, 2001, where government agencies, local government units, industry leaders and non-government organizations signed a declaration of commitment upholding Child 21 – a framework on which to anchor all action plans and strategies relating to children. She traveled nationwide coordinating the agency's feeding and educational programs. She became concerned over the fate of teachers and school children who were taken hostage by the Abu Sayyaf terrorists in 2001. After consultation with the victims themselves, she sought the help of clinical psychologists from Ateneo de Manila University and Ateneo de Zamboanga University.

Madrigal was elected to the Senate in 2004 and was chairman of four Senate committees: Environment; Youth, Women and Family Relations; Peace, Unification and Reconciliation; and Cultural Communities.

In an opposition protest, Madrigal was one of the political leaders who were subjected to the Manila Police water cannons while attending a religious procession on October 14, 2005.

Madrigal declared her candidacy for president in the 2010 presidential election as an independent. Madrigal launched many allegations of corruption against fellow Senator and presidential candidate Manny Villar. Over the course of the campaign, Madrigal brought out "700 pages of evidence" to prove that Villar had "realigned C-5 (a main Metro Manila thoroughfare) to pass by [Villar's] real estate developments so that [Villar] would be paid for right of way." However, she lost, placing 8th behind Nicanor Perlas.

Madrigal sought for Senate comeback in 2013 as a candidate of the Team PNoy administration coalition. She joined the Liberal Party and became allies with President Benigno Aquino III, her rival in the 2010 elections. However, she lost, placing 20th.

== Post-Senate ==
On February 23, 2017, Justice Secretary Vitaliano Aguirre II accused Madrigal and Biñan Representative Marlyn Alonte-Naguiat, both former members of the Liberal Party, for offering a ₱100-million bribe to high-profile inmates to recant their testimony against Senator Leila de Lima in connection to the New Bilibid Prison drug trafficking scandal. Then abroad, Madrigal denied the accusation, saying it was "baseless, malicious and outright lies." She said that she is of no relation and didn't speak to a certain Lalaine Madrigal Martinez (wife of convicted kidnapper and drug lord Noel Martinez), whom she had allegedly approached to offer the bribe. Nevertheless, netizens criticized Aguirre for simply accusing others without any evidences.

== Personal life ==
Madrigal married Frenchman Eric Jean-Claude Valade on December 7, 2002, at the Calatagan, Batangas farm estate of her aunt, Doña Consuelo "Chito" Madrigal vda. de Collantes.

In May 2008, she formally filed court pleadings to contest the validity of the last will and testament of her paternal aunt, who died in March of that year.

== Electoral history ==
Electoral history of Jamby Madrigal
| Year | Office | Party | Votes received | | | | Result |
| Year | Office | Party | Total | % | P. | Swing | Result |
|---|---|---|---|---|---|---|---|
| 2001 | Senator of the Philippines | LDP | 5,043,043 | 17.11% | 23rd | —N/a | Lost |
| 2004 | Senator of the Philippines | LDP | 13,253,692 | 37.32% | 4th | +20.21 | Won |
| 2013 | Senator of the Philippines | Liberal | 6,787,744 | 16.91% | 20th | -21.41 | Lost |
| 2010 | President of the Philippines | IND | 46,489 | 0.13% | 8th | —N/a | Lost |
