= Social Justice Society =

Political party in the Philippines

- Founded: 1999
- Headquarters: Ermita, Manila
- Ideology: Conservatism
- Political position: Centre-right
- Colors: Red and white
- Senate: 0 / 24
- House of Representatives: 0 / 316

The Social Justice Society (SJS; Tagalog: Katarungang Panlipunan) is a registered national political party in the Philippines composed of citizens of the Philippines from all walks of life who are bound by a common concern or interest in the promotion of social justice for all sectors of Philippine society under the concept of "equal justice for all."The party was also listed in the Commiision of Elections' records for the 2019 national and local election. Alcantara was described as the party's founding president and as an advocate of social justice.

== Candidate for the 2013 Philippine general election ==
Senatorial Slate (1)

- Samson Alcantara (lost)
