= Grace Poe =

Filipino politician (born 1968)

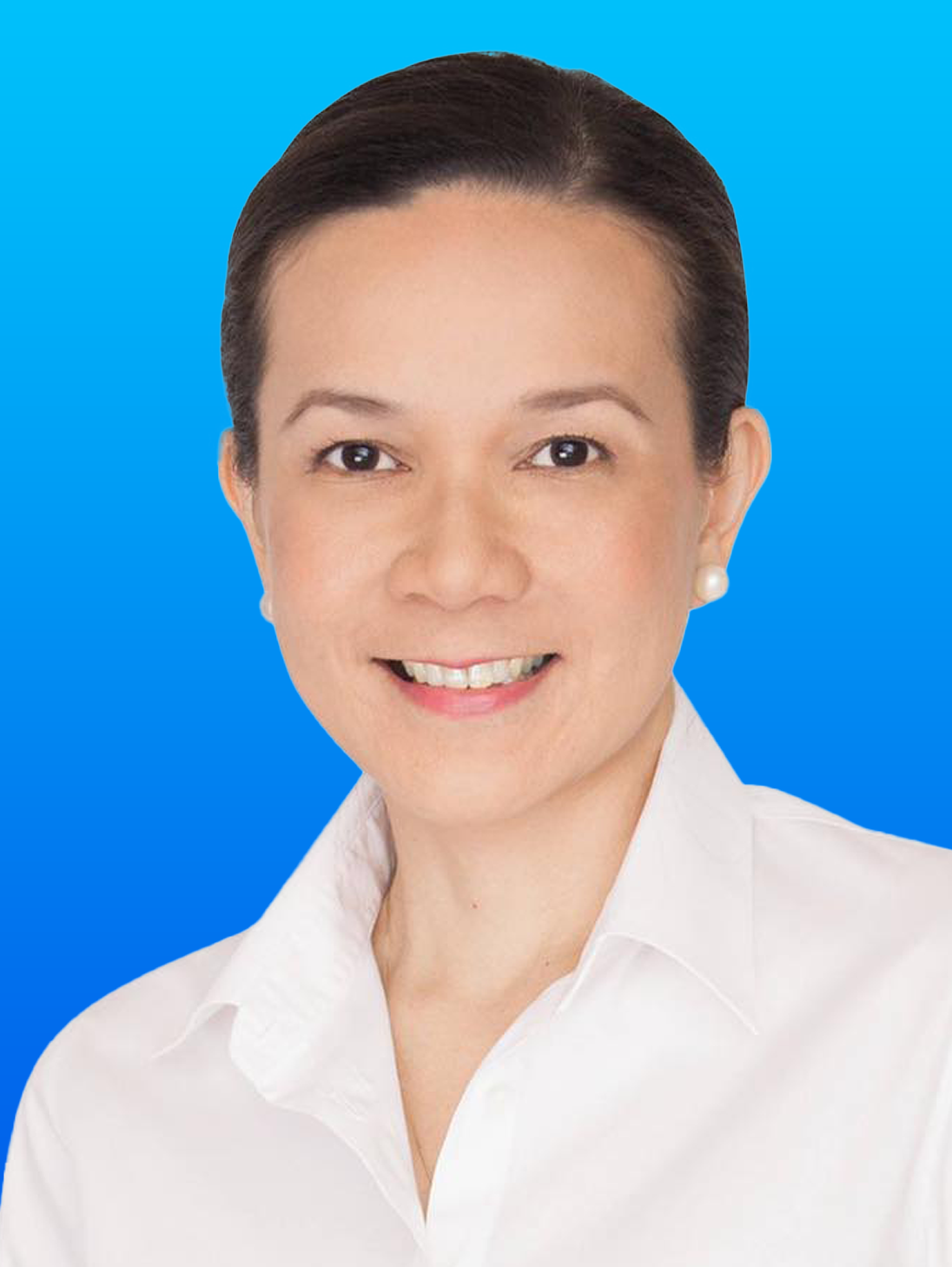
- Portrait of Poe as member of the Philippine Commission on Appointments, c. 2022

Senator of the Philippines
- In office June 30, 2013 – June 30, 2025

Chair of the Senate Economic Affairs Committee
- In office July 25, 2022 – June 30, 2025
- Preceded by: Imee Marcos
- Succeeded by: Juan Miguel Zubiri

Chair of the Senate Public Services Committee
- In office July 25, 2016 – June 30, 2025
- Preceded by: Bong Revilla
- Succeeded by: Raffy Tulfo

Chair of the Senate Banks, Financial Institutions and Currencies Committee
- In office July 22, 2019 – June 30, 2022
- Preceded by: Francis Escudero
- Succeeded by: Mark Villar

Chair of the Senate Public Information and Mass Media Committee
- In office July 22, 2013 – June 30, 2019
- Preceded by: Gregorio Honasan
- Succeeded by: Bong Revilla

Chair of the Senate Public Order and Dangerous Drugs Committee
- In office July 22, 2013 – June 30, 2016
- Preceded by: Gregorio Honasan
- Succeeded by: Panfilo Lacson

Chair of the Movie and Television Review and Classification Board
- In office October 10, 2010 – October 2, 2012
- President: Benigno Aquino III
- Preceded by: Consoliza Laguardia
- Succeeded by: Eugenio Villareal

Personal details
- Born: Mary Grace Natividad Sonora Poe; September 3, 1968 (age 58) Jaro, Iloilo City, Philippines
- Citizenship: Philippines; United States (2001–2010)
- Party: Independent (2012–present)
- Spouse: Neil Llamanzares (m. 1991)
- Relations: Lovi Poe (paternal half-sister); Sheryl Cruz (cousin); Rosemarie Sonora (aunt); Andy Poe (uncle); Conrad Poe (uncle); Fernando Poe Sr. (grandfather)
- Children: 3 (including Brian)
- Parents: Fernando Poe Jr. (father); Susan Roces (mother)
- Education: University of the Philippines Manila; Boston College (BA)
- Website: Campaign website

Mary Grace Natividad Sonora Poe-Llamanzares (born September 3, 1968) is a Filipino politician who served as a senator of the Philippines from 2013 to 2025. An independent, she previously served as chairperson of the Movie and Television Review and Classification Board (MTRCB) from 2010 to 2012. During her time in the Senate, she chaired several committees, including the Committees on Public Services, Economic Affairs, Public Information and Mass Media, and Public Order and Dangerous Drugs. She promoted legislation on education, child welfare, consumer protection, transportation, public services, and freedom of information, and advocated greater transparency and accountability in government.

The adoptive daughter of actors Fernando Poe Jr. and Susan Roces, Poe studied at the University of the Philippines Manila before earning a degree in political science from Boston College in the United States. She returned to the Philippines in 2004 to assist her father's presidential campaign and remained in the country following his death, campaigning against alleged electoral fraud and later entering public service.

Poe was elected to the Senate in the 2013 Philippine Senate election as an independent affiliated with the Team PNoy coalition, receiving the highest number of votes among all candidates. She was the standard bearer of the Partido Galing at Puso in the 2016 Philippine presidential election. After the Supreme Court of the Philippines ruled that she was a natural born Filipino citizen and met the constitutional residency requirement, her candidacy was upheld and she placed third in the election. She was reelected to the Senate in the 2019 Philippine Senate election, again finishing among the top vote getters.

== Early life ==
Poe was found on September 3, 1968, in Iloilo City by a woman, in the holy water font of Jaro Metropolitan Cathedral, the main church of the city.

When the infant was discovered, the parish priest named her "Grace" in the belief that her finding was through divine grace; she was christened by Jaime Sin, the Archbishop of Jaro, who would later become Archbishop of Manila. Although the cathedral issued an announcement in the hopes that her biological mother would claim her, no one stepped forward.

Poe was eventually taken in by the Militar family, with Sayong Militar's in-law Edgardo, who was a signatory on the child's foundling certificate, considered to be her possible father. Her name on her original Certificate of Live Birth was given as Mary Grace Natividad Sonora Militar. Sayong Militar later passed Grace on to her friend Tessie Ledesma Valencia, an unmarried, childless heiress of a sugar baron from Bacolod, Negros Occidental.

Valencia was also a friend of film stars Fernando Poe Jr. and Susan Roces, who were newlyweds at the time; Valencia was an acquaintance of Roces and was the one who brought Grace in trips between Bacolod and Manila. The Poes took Grace in after Valencia decided the baby would be better off with two parents in the Philippines rather than with her as a single parent in the United States, where she was moving to. Militar was initially hesitant in letting the Poe couple adopt Grace because she was unfamiliar with them, having entrusted the baby to Valencia, but was convinced by Archbishop Sin to let the couple adopt her.

Poe was legally adopted by the actors Fernando Poe Jr. and Susan Roces and she was named Mary Grace Natividad Sonora Poe by them. While still young, she watched her father from the sets of his movies—even playing minor roles in some of them, such as the daughter of Paquito Diaz's character in Durugin si Totoy Bato, and as a street child in Dugo ng Bayan. Ultimately, Poe did not enter show business.

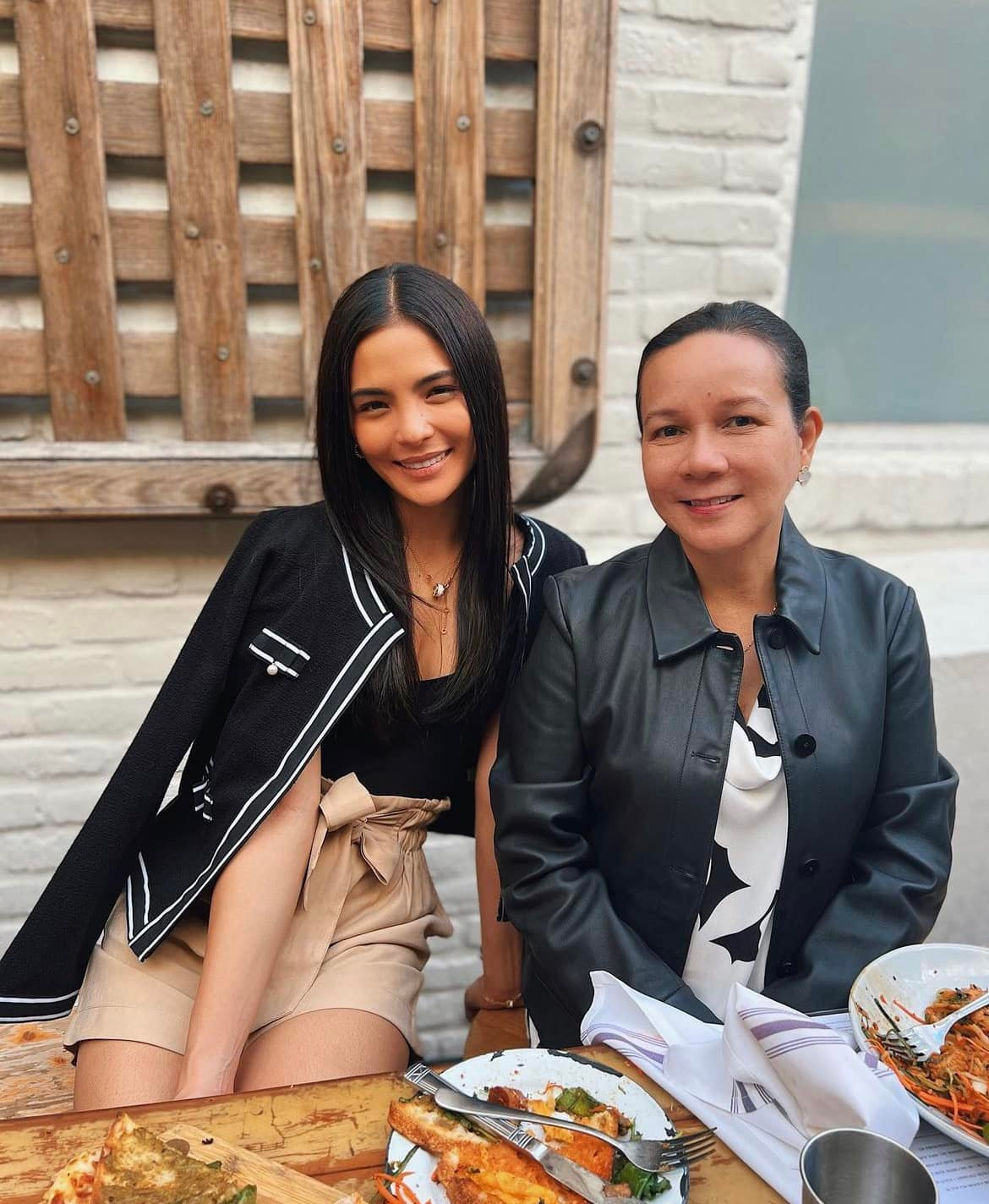
Poe (right) with her half-sister, Lovi (left), in 2022

Poe has two adoptive half-siblings through her father. Both of these half-siblings are actors: Ronian, born to actress Ana Marin; and Lourdes Virginia (Lovi), born to model Rowena Moran. However, she did not grow up with her half-siblings, even admitting that she met Lovi for the first time only after their father died in 2004.

== Education ==
In 1975, Poe attended elementary school at Saint Paul College of Pasig and Saint Paul College of Makati. In 1982, Poe transferred to Assumption College San Lorenzo for high school. Following high school, Poe entered the University of the Philippines Manila (UP), where she majored in development studies. She transferred to Boston College, where she graduated with a degree in political science in 1991. She interned for Bill Weld's campaign while in college.

== Role in father's 2004 presidential campaign ==
In 2003, Poe's father Fernando Jr. announced that he was entering politics, running for president of the Philippines in the upcoming election. He ran under the Koalisyon ng Nagkakaisang Pilipino (KNP), the opposition coalition against President Gloria Macapagal Arroyo, who was seeking reelection. Poe returned to the Philippines to help him campaign, but returned to the United States afterward.

Fernando Jr. was rushed to the hospital after a stroke later that year. Grace immediately returned to the Philippines, only to arrive shortly after her father had died on December 14, 2004. Following her father's death, Poe and her family decided to return permanently to the Philippines on April 8, 2005, to be with her widowed mother.

== MTRCB Chairwoman (2010–2012) ==
In the 2010 general election, Poe served as a convenor of Kontra Daya. She also became honorary chairperson of the FPJ for President Movement (FPJPM), the group which was organized to pressure her father to run in 2004, continuing the movement's social relief programs for the less fortunate. On October 10, 2010, President Benigno Aquino III appointed Poe to serve as chairwoman of the Movie and Television Review and Classification Board (MTRCB). She was sworn in on October 21, 2010, at the Malacañang Palace and was later reappointed by President Benigno Aquino III for another term on October 23, 2011.

While at the MTRCB, Poe had advocated for a "progressive" agency which would have enabled the television and film industries to help the Philippine economy, with her tenure being marked by an emphasis on diplomacy. At the beginning of her term, Poe instigated the implementation of a new ratings system for television programs, which she said was "designed to empower parents to exercise caution and vigilance with the viewing habits of their children". This was complemented by the implementation of a new ratings system for movies—a system which closely follows the new television ratings system—at the end of her term.

The MTRCB under Poe's tenure also implemented policies and programs to promote "intelligent viewing", such as promulgating the implementing rules and regulations for the Children's Television Act of 1997 some fifteen years after its passage, and enforcing restrictions on the type of viewing material that can be shown on public buses. Despite this thrust, Poe has spoken out against restrictions on freedom of expression, preferring self-regulation to censorship. During this time, she encouraged the creation of new cinematic output through the reduction of review fees despite cuts to its budget, and has promoted the welfare of child and female actors.

== Philippine election campaigns ==
=== 2013 ===
Although Poe was rumored to be running for senator as early as 2010, it was not confirmed that she would stand for election until October 1, 2012, when President Aquino announced that she was selected by the administration Team PNoy coalition as a member of their senatorial slate. Poe filed her certificate of candidacy the next day on October 2, 2012. Although running under the banner of the Team PNoy coalition, Poe officially ran as an independent. Poe was also a guest candidate of the left-leaning Makabayang Koalisyon ng Mamamayan. Until February 21, 2013, Poe was, along with Senators Loren Legarda and Francis Escudero, one of three common guest candidates of the opposition United Nationalist Alliance (UNA) of Vice-president Jejomar Binay.

Analysts noted the rapid rise of Poe in national election surveys, which community organizer Harvey Keh attributed to popular sympathy for her father, fueled in part by high public trust in the Poe name. Prior to the start of the election season, Poe was ranked twenty-eighth in a preliminary survey conducted by the Social Weather Stations (SWS) in mid-2012, before the start of the filing period. Immediately after filing her candidacy, Poe initially ranked fifteenth in the first survey of the election, published by StratPOLLS. While she ranked as low as twentieth in a survey published by SWS later in the year, she entered the top 12 in January 2013, where she stayed. In the last survey issued by Pulse Asia in April 2013, she was ranked third.

While Poe herself admitted that her biggest strength in the campaign was her surname, she also conceded that it would be insufficient for her to be elected simply on that alone, emphasizing that her platform is just as important as her name in getting her elected to the Senate. She also dismissed claims that her candidacy was her family's revenge against her father's loss in 2004, saying that all she wants to do is serve should she be elected to the Senate. A day after the election, Poe was announced as among the winners with her having the highest number of votes. She was officially proclaimed a senator by the COMELEC board in May 2013, along with fellow Team PNoy candidates Chiz Escudero, Sonny Angara, Alan Peter Cayetano, and Loren Legarda, as well United Nationalist Alliance candidate Nancy Binay (who did not attend, opting instead to send her lawyer to represent her).

==== Platform ====
In the 2013 elections, Poe ran on an eleven-point platform promising to continue the legacy of her father. Her labor legislative agenda also includes more opportunities, skill development and growth for Filipino workers, employment security for the disabled and handicapped, and protection of workers in the informal sector. Specific policies she advocated in the course of her campaign include reviving the national elementary school lunch program first introduced during Marcos Era, the installation of closed-circuit television cameras in government offices, and stricter penalties against child pornography, continuing her earlier advocacy during her time at the MTRCB. In addition, she has also advocated against Internet censorship.

Poe also stressed the importance of female participation in government, having already filed a number of laws for the betterment of women and children in her term of office; she has also called for an investigation on the proliferation of cybersex dens that prey on children and women, and an inquiry on the condition of women detainees and prisoners.

=== 2019 ===
On May 13, 2019, Poe was reelected to the Senate with over 22 million votes, coming in second, only behind fellow Senator Cynthia Villar.

== Senate of the Philippines (2013–2025) ==
=== First term (2013–2016) ===
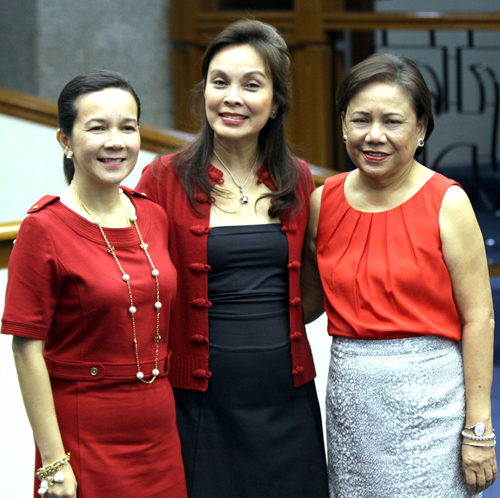
Poe (left) with fellow senators Loren Legarda (center) and Cynthia Villar (right).

On her first day as a senator in the 16th Congress, Poe filed a bill promoting film tourism in the Philippines, aiming to make the country a primary shooting location for local and international films. She said that this would generate jobs and promote tourism in the Philippines as well. Poe also filed the "Sustenance for the Filipino child" bill which seeks to give free nutritious meals to children enrolled in public elementary schools and high schools in K-12. It aims to solve hunger and malnutrition which hindered the Filipino youth's potential.

Another notable bill filed by Poe is the "First 1000 days" bill which seeks to protect and support Filipino children in their first 1,000 days after they were born. This addresses the problem of malnutrition of Filipino children by providing nutrition counselling, milk feeding, and other needs of children. In addition, Poe is also pushing for the Freedom of Information bill which will promote greater transparency and lessen corruption in the government. This bill will allow government transactions to be open to the public.

In 2015, Poe led the legislature's investigations into the Mamasapano clash, which left 44 Special Action Force members dead.

=== Senate (2016–2025) ===
In November 2016, Poe voted in favor of a resolution, filed by senator Risa Hontiveros, which sought to reject the burial of the late dictator Ferdinand Marcos in the Libingan ng mga Bayani.

In February 2017, she voted in favor of the Tax Reform for Acceleration and Inclusion Act (TRAIN Act). After the inflation rate increased due to the law, Poe said that she voted in favor because President Duterte 'needed funds'. On the same month, Poe did not support the resolution declaring that the Senate has a say in the termination of any treaty or international agreement. On December 13, 2017, she voted in favor of the extension of martial law in Mindanao.

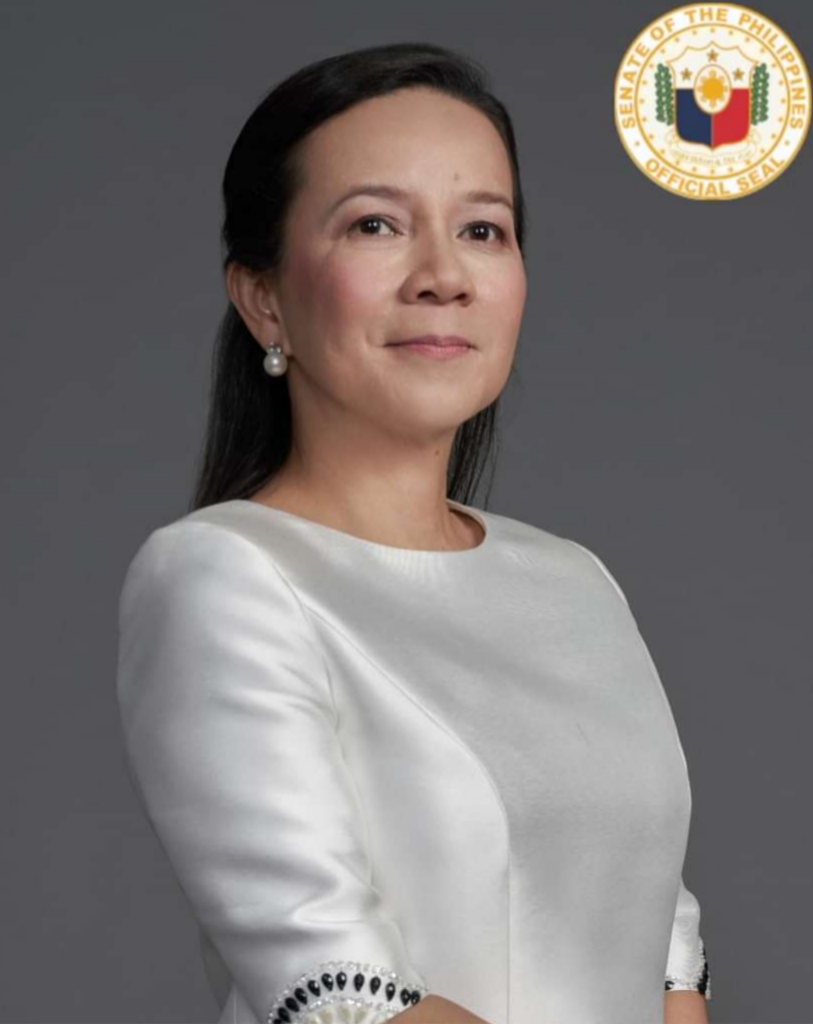
Official portrait, 2019

On May 17, 2018, Poe was among the senators who voted in favor of a resolution calling on the Supreme Court to review its decision granting the quo warranto petition and ousting Chief Justice Maria Lourdes Sereno. In June 2018, she voted in favor of a national ID system. In September 2018, Poe announced her bid for re-election in the Senate. On October 15, she filed her certificate of candidacy for senator.

In 2019, after the 2018 Philippine third telecommunications provider bidding, Poe chaired the committee which allowed the telecommunication franchise of Mislatel, composed of China Telecom and businessman Dennis Uy's Udenna Corp and Chelsea Logistics. The approval was controversial because of the company's connection to China, Chinese security threats, and its violations to Philippine franchise laws. Despite this, on February 6, Poe gave the green light for the company's endorsement to the plenary.

== 2016 presidential campaign ==
I am Grace Poe. A Filipino. A daughter, wife and mother. And with God's grace, I offer myself for the country's highest calling as your President.

— Grace Poe's ending remarks of her speech during her announcement last September 16, 2015.

Poe was widely speculated to be a potential presidential or vice presidential candidate in the 2016 general elections, with possible running mates such as Rep. Leni Robredo and Senator Miriam Defensor-Santiago. Poe placed first on a presidential preference poll issued by Pulse Asia In June 2015 with a rating of 30%, outranking previous front runner Vice President Jejomar Binay, who had a 22% rating. She also placed first in the vice-presidential poll, with a 41% preference nationwide. In an opinion survey issued by Social Weather Stations (SWS) in June 2015, Poe also placed first, with a 42% preference. She also placed first in SWS' vice-presidential poll, with a 41% rating.

On September 16, 2015, Poe, together with Francis Escudero, declared her presidential bid, in front of hundreds of supporters, family and friends at the Bahay ng Alumni, University of the Philippines, Diliman, Quezon City under the newly coalition of Partido Galing at Puso, composed of Bagong Alyansang Makabayan and is led by the Nationalist People's Coalition. Former Philippine President and Mayor of Manila Joseph Estrada has given his support to her. On her speech announcing her presidential bid, Grace Poe laid down a 20-point program of government if she would be elected.

=== Qualification ===
In June 2015, United Nationalist Alliance (UNA) interim president and Navotas Representative Toby Tiangco claimed that Poe lacked the 10-year residency requirement for a presidential candidate. There was an issue about Poe's certificate of candidacy (COC) for senator in 2012 for the 2013 Philippine Senate Elections, in which she had stated that she had been a resident of the Philippines for six years and six months. Tiangco stated that even during the time of the 2016 presidential elections, Poe would still be six months short of the residency requirement.

On November 17, 2015, the Senate Electoral Tribunal opted to drop the cases against her. The decision was affirmed on December 3, 2015. In their judgment on the case, the SET declared that Grace Poe, a foundling, is a "natural-born Filipino", which allowed her to retain her seat in the Philippine Senate. David filed a motion for reconsideration to reverse the ruling by SET, which was rejected on December 3, 2015, after which he filed an appeal with the Supreme Court. On December 1, 2015, the COMELEC's second division disqualified her as presidential candidate due to failing to meet the "10-year requirement" for residency. Under COMELEC rules, the party or coalition supporting her may file a substitute before December 10, 2015. On December 11, the commission's first division also disqualified Poe. The first division, voted 2–1 in favor of the petitions to disqualify and cancel her certificate of candidacy. These decisions were appealed to the COMELEC en banc, which on December 23, 2015, formally disqualified Poe from running as president in the 2016 elections for failing to meet the 10-year residency requirement. Poe said she would appeal the disqualification to the Supreme Court. On December 28, 2015, the Supreme Court issued two temporary restraining orders against the decision of the COMELEC en banc.

On March 8, 2016, voting 9–6, the Supreme Court voted to affirm Poe' natural-born status and 10-year residency. On April 9, 2016, the Supreme Court declared their ruling as final and executory.

== Personal life ==
Poe worked as a preschool teacher at a local Montessori education-style school in 1995. In 1998, she left her job as a teacher to work as a procurement liaison officer at the United States Geological Survey. In 2005, she was made vice president and treasurer of her father's film production company, FPJ Productions, and was put in charge of maintaining the company's archive of over 200 films.

Poe is an avid reader and she has read all the books of David Baldacci, whom she describes as her favorite author. She also watches films, including action films, conspiracy films, films starring her father, and movies with happy endings. Poe plays tennis and holds a black belt in taekwondo, having competed in tournaments while in high school.

=== Citizenship ===
In March 2016, the Supreme Court affirmed that Poe is a natural-born Filipino. On October 18, 2001, Poe acquired U.S. citizenship by naturalization. She reacquired her Philippine citizenship and in October 2010, she renounced her American citizenship, as per Republic Act 9225. Poe's name appeared in the 2012 2Q Quarterly Publication of Individuals Who Have Chosen to Expatriate.

=== Family ===
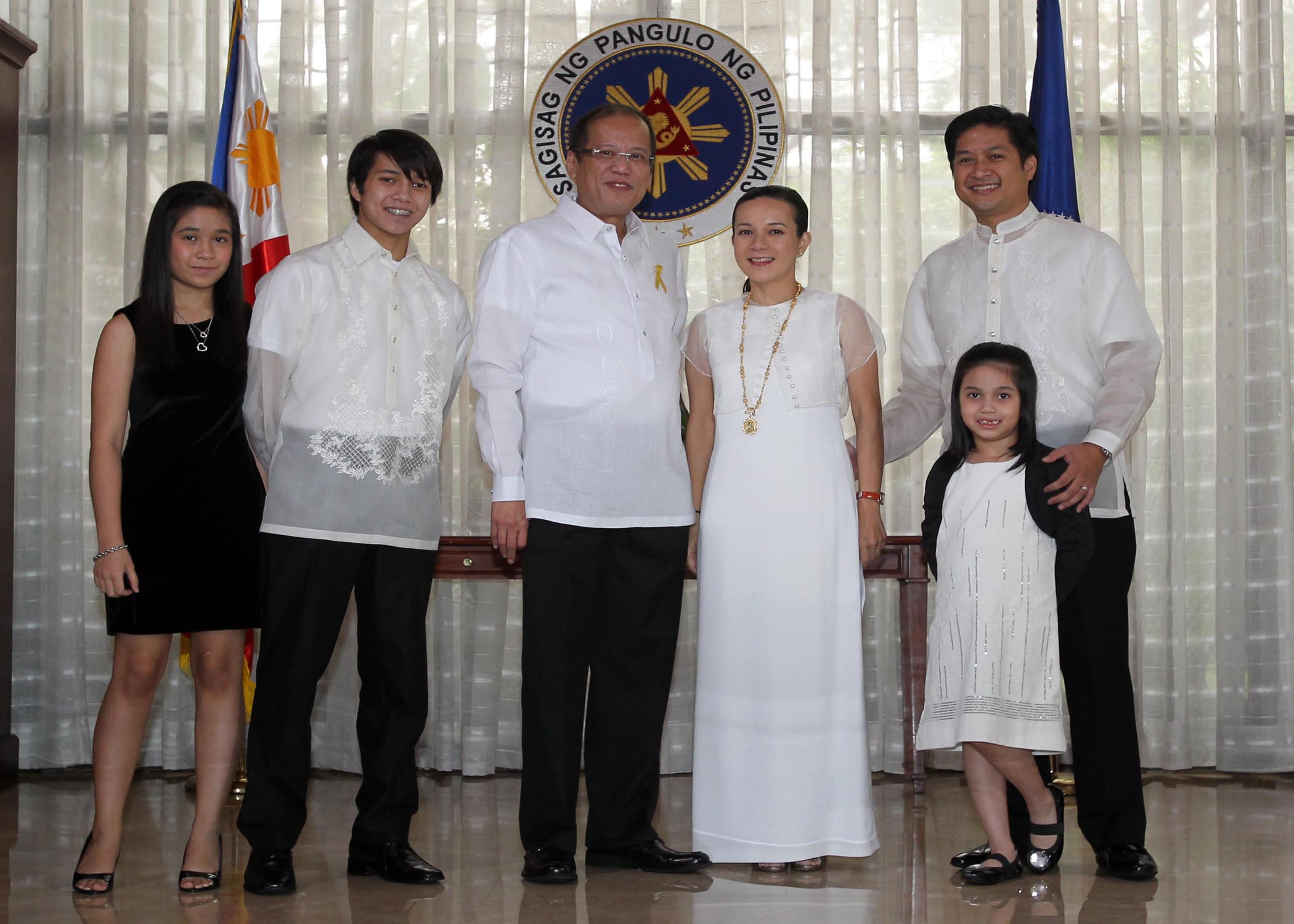
Grace Poe-Llamanzares and her family with President Benigno Aquino III at her oathtaking as MTRCB chairwoman in 2010.

Poe married Teodoro Misael Daniel "Neil" Vera Llamanzares on July 27, 1991. Llamanzares is a natural-born Filipino who held American citizenship since birth until April 2016. He is a veteran of the United States Air Force who served from 1988 to 1991 and later worked for Science Applications International Corporation. He worked for San Miguel Corporation after the return of his wife to the Philippines.

On April 16, 1992, Poe gave birth to her son, Brian, a legislator representing the FPJ Panday Bayanihan party-list and a former reporter for CNN Philippines. She later gave birth to two daughters: Hanna in 1998, and Nika in 2004. Her family lived in Fairfax, Virginia, for 12 years. Hanna has served as assistant vice president of UnionBank since 2026.

== Electoral history ==
Electoral history of Grace Poe
Year	Office	Party	Votes received				Result
Year	Office	Party	Total	%	P.	Swing	Result
2013	Senator of the Philippines	IND	20,337,327	50.66%	1st	—N/a	Won
2019	Senator of the Philippines	IND	22,029,788	46.58%	2nd	-4.08	Won
2016	President of the Philippines	IND	9,100,991	21.39%	3rd	—N/a	Lost
