= Christian Señeres =

Filipino politician

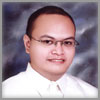
- Official portrait, c. 2003—2007

Member of the Philippine House of Representatives for Buhay
- In office December 15, 2003 – June 30, 2007 Serving with Rene Velarde

Personal details
- Born: March 3, 1976 (age 50) Makati
- Party: DPP (2012–present)
- Other political affiliations: Buhay (2003–2007)
- Relations: Roy Señeres (father)
- Education: Southeastern University (BS); Northwestern University (JD)
- Occupation: NGO worker
- Profession: Lawyer

Christian Maaño Señeres (born March 3, 1976) is a Filipino non-governmental organization worker who served as a member of the Philippine House of Representatives, representing the BUHAY Party-List from 2003 to 2007. He ran as a senatorial candidate for the 2013 Philippine Senate election under the newly accredited Democratic Party of the Philippines, but failed to win a seat. He also unsuccessfully ran for representative of Quezon's 2nd district in 2019.
