= Ramon Montaño =

Filipino general (1937–2024)

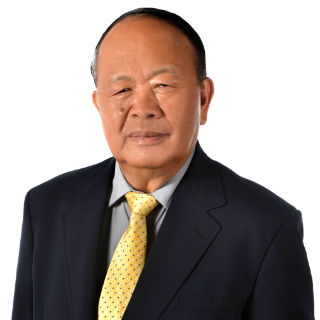

Chief of the Philippine Constabulary
- Director General of the Integrated National Police
- In office January 26, 1988 – March 30, 1990
- AFP Chief of Staff: Gen. Renato de Villa, PC; Gen. Rodolfo Biazon, PMC
- Preceded by: Renato de Villa
- Succeeded by: Cesar P. Nazareno

Personal details
- Born: March 13, 1937 Cebu City, Commonwealth of the Philippines
- Died: July 2, 2024 (aged 87)
- Party: Independent (2013–2024); Isang Bansa Isang Diwa (2004); NPC (1992)
- Spouse: Fe Pareja
- Education: Philippine Military Academy (BS)
- Occupation: Military officer

Military service
- Branch/service: Philippine Constabulary
- Years of service: 1958–1990
- Rank: Major General
- Commands: Capital Command
- Battles/wars: 1986–87 Coup attempts

Ramon Montaño (March 3, 1937 – July 2, 2024) was a Filipino politician and military officer.

== Early life ==
Montaño was born in Cebu City in 1937 to a family that originated from Iloilo and Guimaras.

== Military career ==
Montaño graduated from the Philippine Military Academy in 1958 and served in the Philippine Constabulary. He was among several military officers who rebelled against the regime of President Ferdinand Marcos during the 1986 People Power Revolution.

During the administration of President Corazon Aquino, he was head of the Philippine Constabulary Capital Region Command, during which he was in overall command of police officers who opened fire on protesters demanding agrarian reform during the Mendiola Massacre in January 1987, which led him to resign. He later became chief of the Philippine Constabulary-Integrated National Police from 1988 to 1990, during which he oversaw the arrest of Reform the Armed Forces Movement leader Gringo Honasan in December 1987.

== Civilian and political career ==
Following his retirement from the police service, Montaño became an undersecretary for the Department of the Interior and Local Government during the Aquino presidency in 1991 and served as presidential adviser for political affairs under President Fidel V. Ramos.

He ran for mayor of Makati in 1992 under the Nationalist People's Coalition but lost to mayor Jejomar Binay.

Montaño ran for the Senate as a candidate of the Partido Isang Bansa Isang Diwa in the 2004 elections but lost. In 2006, he was arrested on charges of sedition following an alleged coup plot against President Gloria Macapagal-Arroyo but was later released due to lack of evidence. He ran again for the Senate as an independent candidate in 2013, but lost again.

== Personal life and death ==
Montaño was married to Fe Pareja, who later became mayor of San Jose, Negros Oriental. He died on July 2, 2024, at the age of 87.
