= Ricardo Penson =

Filipino businessman

Personal details
- Born: June 9, 1952 (age 74) Caloocan, Rizal, Philippines
- Party: Independent
- Spouse: Dina Bonnevie (m. 1996; ann. 2004)
- Children: Ricky Asler Penson
- Education: San Beda College (BSBA, Marketing); University of Cincinnati (BBA, Marketing Management); Wharton School of the University of Pennsylvania (MDP, Management)
- Occupation: Business executive, social activist

Ricardo Lagdameo Penson (born June 9, 1952) is a Filipino business executive and social activist. At present, he is the president and chief executive officer of Ausphil Tollways Corporation a Manila-based transport infrastructure development company and Penson & Company, Inc. He ran and lost as an independent candidate for the 2013 Philippine Senate elections.

He advocates for an end to political dynasties in the Philippines and believes that immediate family members should be prohibited from running for public office regardless of the place or position. In November 2012, he launched the Krusada Kontra Dynasty movement in order to further campaign for this advocacy. If elected as senator, he vows to pass a bill prohibiting political dynasties and that he would resign if it fails to become a law.

Penson is single but was previously married to four women, the most notable of which was with Filipina actress Dina Bonnevie in 1996. His marriage to Bonnevie was annulled in 1999 amid accusations that he was psychologically incapable of being married.

Penson, aside from being the CEO of Ausphil Tollways, is Chairman of Defense Resources Inc and Philco Aero Inc., original proponent of the Clark International Airport Terminal 2 Project.
