= Mitos Magsaysay =

Filipino politician

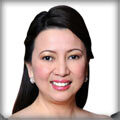
- Official portrait, 2010

Member of the Philippine House of Representatives from Zambales' 1st district
- In office June 30, 2004 – June 30, 2013
- Preceded by: James Gordon Jr.
- Succeeded by: Jeffrey Khonghun

Personal details
- Born: Maria Milagros Habana; January 4, 1964 (age 62) Castillejos, Zambales, Philippines
- Party: PDP (2021–present)
- Other political affiliations: Lakas (2004–2012); UNA (2012–2018); PFP (2018–2021)
- Spouse: Jesus Vicente Magsaysay
- Relations: Vicente Magsaysay (father-in-law)
- Profession: Entrepreneur, Politician

Maria Milagros "Mitos" Habana-Magsaysay (born January 4, 1964), is a Filipino politician who served as Congresswoman of the 1st district of Zambales from 2004 to 2013, and was a senatorial candidate of the United Nationalist Alliance in the 2013 election.

== Political career ==
She was a representative from the 1st District of Zambales for 3 consecutive terms. After her congressional career, she ran for a senate spot under the United Nationalist Alliance (UNA). She claimed in February 2013 that the Liberals was using arm-twisting tactics on some politicians and local executives who are friendly to UNA. She lost and placed 21st.

On November 27, 2018, Magsaysay officially filed her certificate of candidacy for Congresswoman of the 1st district of Zambales and Olongapo City. To reclaim her seat in the House of Representatives, she was up against incumbent 1st District Congressman Jeffrey Khonghun who was gunning for his 3rd and last term as representative of the first district of Zambales. She was a Partido Federal ng Pilipinas (PFP) candidate and, after the 2019 elections, lost to Khonghun by more than 68,000 votes.

== Personal life ==
She is married to Jesus Vicente Magasaysay, son of former Zambales Governor Vicente Magsaysay.

House of Representatives of the Philippines
Preceded by James Gordon Jr.	Member of the House of Representatives from the 1st District of Zambales; 2004-2013	Succeeded by Jeff Khonghun
