= Democratic Party of the Philippines =

Political party in the Philippines

Democratic Party of the Philippines Partido Demokratiko ng Pilipinas - Reporma Pilipinas
- President: Baldomero Falcone
- Founded: 2010
- Headquarters: Manila
- Ideology: Popular democracy Anti-communism; Populism
- Political position: Center-right
- Colors: Blue
- Senate: 0 / 24
- House of Representatives: 0 / 316

Website
- DPP.org.ph

The Democratic Party of the Philippines is a center-right, populist political party in the Philippines founded in 2010 by Dr. Ernesto G. Ramos. It seeks to be an alternative to traditional politics.

== History ==
The party was established in 2010 by Ernesto G. Ramos, aiming to have a party that is an alternative to traditional politics.

=== 2013 general election ===
In the 2013 general elections, the party fielded Greco Belgica, Baldomero Falcone and Christian Señeres as its candidates for the senate. All three candidates failed to secure a seat.

=== 2022 Philippine presidential election ===
In the 2022 Philippine presidential election, Jose Montemayor Jr. ran unsuccessfully for president under the party's banner with Rizalito David as his running mate.

== Electoral performance ==
=== President ===
Election	Candidate	Number of votes	Share of votes	Outcome of election
2022	Jose Montemayor Jr.	60,592	0.11%	Lost

=== Vice president ===
Election	Candidate	Number of votes	Share of votes	Outcome of election
2022	Rizalito David	56,711	0.11%	Lost

=== Senate ===
Election	Number of votes	Share of votes	Seats won	Seats after	Outcome of election
2013	2,500,967	0.84%	0 / 12	0 / 24	Lost
2016	Did not participate				
2019	Did not participate				
2022	400,138	0.09%	0 / 12	0 / 24	Lost
2025	383,534	0.09%	0 / 12	0 / 24	Lost

=== House of Representatives ===
Election	Number of votes	Share of votes	Seats	Outcome of election
2013	1,071	0.00%	0 / 293	Lost
2016	Did not participate			
2019	1,110	0.00%	0 / 304	Lost
2022	Did not participate			
2025	Did not participate			
