= John Carlos de los Reyes =

Filipino politician

Member of the Olongapo City Council
- In office June 30, 2007 – June 30, 2010
- In office June 30, 1995 – June 30, 1998

Personal details
- Born: February 14, 1970 (age 56)
- Party: Ang Kapatiran
- Occupation: Civil servant
- Profession: Professor, businessman
- Website: http://www.kapatiranparty.org/

John Carlos "JC" Gordon de los Reyes (born February 14, 1970) is the President of the Ang Kapatiran Party and a senatorial candidate for the 2013 Philippine midterm election. De los Reyes was a councilor in Olongapo and the presidential candidate of the Ang Kapatiran Party for the 2010 Philippine presidential election.

== Education and career ==
De los Reyes studied at the Ateneo de Manila for his elementary education and graduated from De La Salle Santiago Zobel School for high school. He finished his Bachelor of Arts in Theology at the Franciscan University of Steubenville.

In late 1993, he taught philosophy in the Center for Research and Communication, now known as the University of Asia and the Pacific. During that time, he was under the tutelage of Father Joseph de Torre, a Spanish priest of the Holy Cross who wrote about the social teachings of the Church.

In 1999, he finished his postgraduate studies in public administration from the University of the Philippines. In 2005, he finished his law degree at Saint Louis University in Baguio.

== Personal life ==
De Los Reyes is married to Filipino-Brazilian, Dunia Valenzuela-Delos Reyes, with whom he has four children: Gabriel, Santiago, Barbara, and Julianna.
