= Fernando Batul =

Filipino radio journalist, activist and politician (born 1969)

Vice Mayor of Puerto Princesa
- In office June 30, 2001 – July 21, 2003
- Mayor: Victorino Dennis Socrates (2001–2002); Edward Hagedorn (2002–2003)
- Preceded by: Vicky T. De Guzman
- Succeeded by: Lucilo Bayron

Personal details
- Born: May 24, 1969 Puerto Princesa, Palawan, Philippines
- Died: May 22, 2006 (aged 36) Puerto Princesa, Palawan, Philippines
- Cause of death: murder
- Education: Palawan State College
- Occupation: Journalist/radio commentator and politician
- Known for: Political activism

Fernando "Dong" Ulson Batul (May 24, 1969 – May 22, 2006) was a Filipino journalist and politician.

Batul worked as a radio broadcaster and commentator in Puerto Princesa, Palawan, Philippines. He was elected city vice mayor in 2001 but was unseated before he could finish his term.

He was an anchorman of provincial radio station DYPR-AM when he was assassinated in 2006. One of the two gunmen, a policeman, was later acquitted for the killing. Batul was the first journalist killed in Palawan, and the 5th broadcaster killed in the Philippines in that year.

He was known for his commentaries that were critical of politicians, military officials, rival radio commentators and others. Most of his remarks were made towards the mayor's administration about the quality of governance in Palawan. He had many supporters, but he angered many with his commentaries.

== Early and personal life ==
Fernando "Dong" Batul was born on May 24, 1969, in (then-municipality) Puerto Princesa, Palawan; he was the youngest of the seven children of Conrada Ulson, a market vendor, and Alejandro Batul (now deceased), a carpenter, both of Cuyo. Batul remained a bachelor throughout his life.

== Education ==
Batul finished elementary at East Central School in 1982 and secondary at Palawan National School in 1986. In 1990, he finished Bachelor of Arts in Political Science in Palawan State College, and took also Philosophy and Master of Arts in Public Administration.

Batul became involved in campus politics. Since he was in secondary school, he became leader of various student organizations, as well as an activist. In 1989, he was elected chairperson of the university's student council.

He was also active in civic organizations, and being a Roman Catholic, also became an official of church youth groups.

== Career ==
=== Professional career ===
After college, Batul worked as a tricycle driver for few months.

He later started his service in government. From 1990 to 2000, he worked at the Crocodile Farming Institute (CFI), then a project of governments of the Philippines, through Department of Environment and Natural Resources, and of Japan, through Japan International Cooperation Agency, under the management of Dr. Gerardo Ortega. He first worked as a clerk, eventually became the project's information officer. By that time, CFI became known worldwide; their information campaign led to CFI being a main tourist destination.

As an Information Officer, he used his skill in speech on giving accurate information about the importance of the two endangered species of crocodiles (Crocodylus mindorensis and Crocodylus porosus) and the purposes and tasks of this project.

There, he had a small business of selling souvenir items.

=== Media career ===
He began his work in the media in the 1990s when he was just a clerk in Crocodile Farm [Institute,] Inc.

Batul, in his media career, exposed irregularities in various agencies.

==== Print ====
Dong continued being an activist in the early 1990s, especially against then-popular jueteng. With his friend Edmond Gastanes, he established Bunyog Palawan, an alternative newsletter, to expose social issues in the province. With his own money, regular issues were published within almost five years, with 2,000 copies distributed provincewide.

The two were later charged of libel by then Narra municipal mayor Clarito Demaala, whom they implicated in jueteng activities in an article. Almost two years later, the case was ordered dismissed by the Department of Justice due to lack of merit.

==== Radio ====
Batul also worked for radio stations. Being a popular, hard-hitting broadcaster and commentator in Palawan, his reporting focused on alleged corruption, in government and in media in the province, and nepotism; as well as politics and the military's security lapses in handling insurgents. His criticisms earned him the ire of local politicians, military officials, erring government personnel, and even rival broadcasters.

At the same time that he was a city government employee, he first hosted an evening public service program, Kulog at Kidlat, which aired over RGMA Super Radyo–DYSP from February 1, 1998 until prior to entering politics in 2001. Due to its popularity, both Batul and the station decided to establish Kulog at Kidlat Foundation, Inc. in 1999.

Since then, he became known as a critic of the administration of then city mayor Edward Hagedorn, who then filed another, several libel complaints against him. According to Hagedorn, following his victory in the 2002 recall election, he dropped the case. Batul was briefly detained by National Bureau of Investigation.

After his stint in politics, in 2005, Batul resumed his radio career on another station, now-defunct DYPR-AM, which was owned by the Palawan Broadcasting Corporation. Becoming a full-fledged journalist, he was a blocktimer and eventually, the host of morning program Bastonero. He was widely credited for DYPR being the top-rated local AM radio station in that year.

He earned the ire of the military, particularly the Philippine Army, for interviewing local members of the leftist New People's Army including those suspectedly involved in the killing of a retired policeman in the city, even its spokesman Gregorio Rosal.

Prior to later attacks, among the stories that he had been discussing were the condition of contract workers from Palawan allegedly being maltreated in Taiwan, as well as the anomalous recruitment of them. He reportedly criticized the city government over the allegation; as well as the involvement of a police officer. Those officials likewise became angry.

At that time, Batul also worked for DZRH.

Batul became popular and gained many listeners because he showed them that he was just like them.

=== Religious involvement ===
In 1995, Batul became one of Palawan's first youth members of church group Singles for Christ (SFC), then starting their evangelization ministry in the province. He became an officer and, eventually, was elected chapter head for Puerto Princesa. In 1999, Batul was among the three who were sent by SFC to Israel where they held the Christian Life Program for the youths.

=== Political career ===
In 2001, Batul was elected city vice mayor of Puerto Princesa, defeating a Hagedorn's relative, Lucilo Bayron of Puwersa ng Masa; along with Atty. Dennis Socrates as city mayor and five of the members of their Lakas–NUCD–KAMPI ticket.

The two had their terms unfinished. Bayron, alleging cheating, filed an electoral protest which was granted by the Commission on Elections First Division on July 21, 2003, issuing an order unseating Batul. On the other hand, Socrates lost to Hagedorn, who had been replaced yet unsuccessfully ran for governor of Palawan, through a recall election against the former in 2002.

In another election in 2004, the Socrates–Batul tandem failed to regain the positions, losing to the incumbent Hagedorn–Bayron tandem.

== Later life and death ==
Puerto Princesa, Palawan is in the Philippines shown here relative to the capital Manila.

=== Grenade attack ===
Because of his commentaries, Batul became a subject of numerous death threats. DYPR once hired a security guard to keep angry listeners from attacking him.

On April 24, 2006, a failed grenade attack occurred at his family residence in Puerto Princesa. Two thrown but unexploded live grenades were found, both were safely detonated by the local police; along with a written letter, threatening his family and warning him of dire consequences on them if he continued his criticisms.

He alleged that those behind the incident were police and officials whom he had criticized on DYPR. By following month, the perpetrators were neither identified nor arrested.

Nevertheless, Batul continued his commentaries. He refused to take extra precautions, according to his friend, Ortega, former DYPR station manager. Lourdes Escaros-Paet, his co-worker, later revealed that he was supposed to file in Manila on May 24 a media corruption case against two broadcasters in a rival radio station in the province.

=== Death ===
==== Assassination ====
On May 22, 2006, Batul, scheduled to air his program at 6:30 a.m. over DYPR, was on his way to work driving his multicab when he was blocked and shot at close range by two motorcycle-riding men, wearing helmets, at a street corner, at least 100 meters from radio station compound. There were also two other men on another motorcycle reportedly served as "lookouts." All of the suspects then escaped.

He was brought to nearby Cooperative Hospital, where he was pronounced dead on arrival. Batul sustained twelve gunshot wounds, mostly in the head and chest, from .45 caliber and 9-mm pistols. (Note: As per news reports, Batul was shot either four or six times; the latter according to Committee to Protect Journalists.)

He was the first journalist killed in the province; and the fifth in the country in 2006.

==== Reactions ====
Then mayor Hagedorn, reacting to the suspicions, immediately denied his involvement in the assassination.

The provincial government of Palawan and city government of Puerto Princesa each offered half-a-million-peso reward for information on the killers.

The killing was widely believed work-related.

Malacañang, through Press Secretary Ignacio Bunye, condemned the killing, directing authorities to hasten their investigation. President Gloria Arroyo tasked the Philippine National Police for this. Expressed condemnation as well were media colleagues (Palawan Press Club), political leaders (Rep. Abraham Mitra), and his supporters (a church bishop).

==== Investigation and trial ====
Police officer Aaron Golifardo, reportedly identified by witnesses, was charged with murder two days after the incident. Golifardo was criticized in Batul's May 11 broadcast for allegedly showing a weapon during an argument in a karaoke bar. Hearings in the suspect's trial began in September; ended on April 11, 2011 when Palawan Regional Trial Court Branch 95 acquitted Golifardo, citing the prosecution's failure to establish that he is one of the killers. Another assailant was never identified. The case remains unsolved.

Meanwhile, two Batul's colleagues investigating his death reportedly fled Palawan in June 2006 due to safety concerns after receiving threats.

United States-based media watchdog group Committee to Protect Journalists expressed dismay over Golifardo's acquittal as they noted that the verdict was reported only by a few media outlets. It said that the murder case remains open, and the impunity with killings of journalists in the country remains "a matter of national shame." By then, the Philippines ranks third on its impunity index.

=== Context ===
Prior to Batul's death, the Center for Media Freedom and Responsibility counted 57 or 58 journalists killed in the line of duty since the restoration of democracy in 1986 (in 2006, two were confirmed killed in the line of duty). For the past six years, like Batul, other journalists were reporting on anomalies in their communities at the time of their deaths, as suggested by their study of media killings released in 2005.

Also, before Batul was murdered, according to the National Union of Journalists of the Philippines, 78 reporters were listed that were killed since democracy in the country was restored in 1986. Safety of journalists in the Philippines was becoming more of a concern as the Brussels-based International Federation of Journalists said the situation "has gone from bad to worse" after a tabloid photographer was murdered and hours later another journalist was beaten. A total of 120 journalists have been killed in the Philippines in line of duty since 1986 and Batul was the 67th. That means 66 journalists had been murdered before Batul in the Philippines before him in just 20 years. The station where Batul worked, DYPR, once had to hire a security guard to keep angry listeners from attacking a different radio commentator.

== Impact ==
Batul's death has impacted people and the society in many ways, from keeping people in hiding and trying to convince their innocence, to people fleeing and striking fear into other journalists. Letty Batul, Fernando Batul's sister, has described that since her brother's killing, many campaign journalists have fled the area. She also pointed out that the murder of her brother and another popular journalist, Gerry Ortega, had silenced serious whistleblowing journalism in the area. Batul's murder is still somewhat of a mystery as people are still questioning who really was behind the murder today. In 2013, Edward Hagedorn was still trying to convince people that he had no connection in the murders of Batul and Ortega. He compared his own situation as someone who has not gone into hiding with others who had fled, like the Reyes brothers who were still in hiding since evidence connected them to the murder of Ortega.

== Reactions ==
On May 29, 2006, Koïchiro Matsuura, director-general of UNESCO, condemned the murder of Fernando "Dong" Batul. In his statement, Matsuura demanded authorities bring the culprits to justice. He said, "It is completely unacceptable that murder be used to silence opinions. Such violence targets not only its individual victims but society as a whole, because open debate and the basic human right of freedom of expression are indispensable fundamental components of democracy and rule of law." as said by Mr. Matsuura while giving his speech on the condemnation of Batul.

Bishop Pedro Arigo of Puerto Princesa dedicated World Communications Day, May 28, to Batul who was active in Church movements. Father Eugene Elivera, who was the director of the local Church's Social Action and Special Concerns office, said on May 26 that all masses that Sunday would be dedicated to the slain Batul.

== See also ==
- Crocodile farming in the Philippines
