= 2015 Puerto Princesa mayoral recall election =

- May 8, 2015
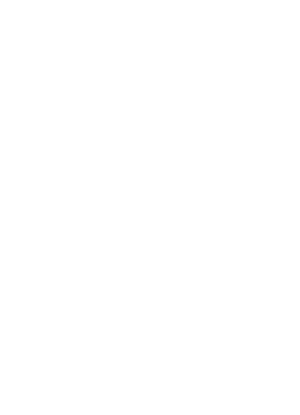

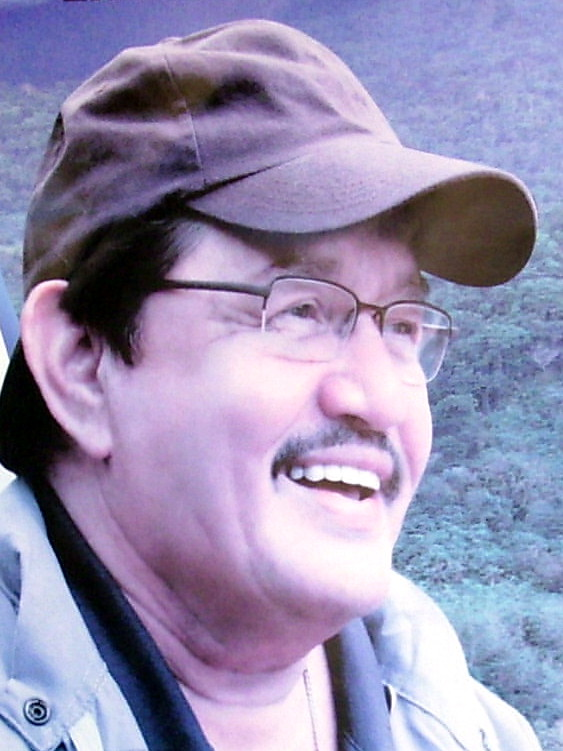
Candidate	Lucilo Bayron	Edward Hagedorn
Party	UNA	Liberal
Popular vote	44,299	39,002
Percentage	53.18	46.82
Mayor before election
Lucilo Bayron
UNA
Mayor-elect
Lucilo Bayron
UNA

The 2015 Puerto Princesa mayoral recall election was held on May 8, 2015, in the city of Puerto Princesa, Philippines. City mayor Lucilo Bayron defeated former mayor Edward Hagedorn in the recall election.

== Electoral system ==
Recall elections are allowed by Republic Act No. 7160 or the Local Government Code of the Philippines. A recall can be initiated by a petition of at least 25% of the registered voters in the local government unit (LGU) concerned. An official could only be subjected to a recall only once during one's term of office, and from one year after the official took office, up to one year before the next regularly scheduled election. For local officials elected in 2013, they can only be recalled from June 30, 2014, to May 8, 2015.

Previously, a preparatory recall assembly composed of all of the elected local officials in the LGU concerned was another method of initiating a recall election but was discontinued in 2004 through Republic Act No. 9244.

City mayors are elected via first-past-the-post voting.

== Background ==
This is not the first mayoral recall election in Puerto Princesa. In 2002, Edward Hagedorn, who was term limited in the 2001 election, defeated Victorino Dennis Socrates, the mayor that replaced him. Hagedorn was term limited anew in the 2013 election. He ran for the Senate but lost. Meanwhile, Vice Mayor Lucilo Bayron was elected mayor over Hagedorn's wife and his sister-in-law in the city elections held in the same date.

On March 17, 2014, a recall petition was filed at the Commission on Elections office in Puerto Princesa. The petition cited a "'breach of trust,' declining tourism activities and a deteriorating peace and order situation" as the reasons for the recall. The petition was led by Muslim leader Al Babao and political lobbyist Joey Mirasol, both known supporters of Hagedorn. Bayron denied that the city's tourism was in decline, nor was there increasing criminal activity, and accused of Hagedorn of being behind the recall petition, saying that "They cannot accept that they lost in the last elections".

A month later, the commission approved the petition, but deferred the verification of signatures due to lack of funds. The petition had 40,409 signatures, which was more than twice of the 19,335 that was needed. By May 2014, chairman Sixto Brillantes was considering two options on funding the recall election: either asking the Department of Budget and Management to realign their savings for the conduct of the recall election, or ask Congress for a supplemental budget. Aside from the Puerto Princesa recall, several other petitions were put on hold due to funding problems.

The petitioners went to the Supreme Court to force the commission to verify the signatures. On November 25, 2014, the court, via a unanimous decision, ordered the commission to conduct the election. The Supreme Court noted that there is an existing appropriation from the 2014 budget for funding of recall elections, giving the committee chairman the "authority to augment such line item appropriation from the Comelec’s existing savings".

Mayor Bayron then sought to stop the proceedings by filing a petition to the Supreme Court. Bayron questioned if the one-year limitation should be counted from the filing of the petition or from the conduct of the recall election itself. The court dismissed Bayron's petition on February 16, 2015, and ordered the commission to proceed with the recall election. A month later, the commission ordered an investigation on Bayron's alleged disruption of the recall proceedings against him. Bayron, on the verification of the signatures on February 28 at the Puerto Princesa City Coliseum, confronted election officer Mon Garduce, ordering him to stop the proceedings. Alborn Goh, who filed the request for the investigation, said that Bayron snatched the copy of the commission's resolution from Garduce, and tore it down. Goh said that "It is to our total dismay that the police assigned to guard the proceedings did not lift a finger to stop and arrest Bayron, his bodyguards and goons, for violations of penal, election and anti-graft laws."

Later that month, the commission announced that it had affirmed 22,326 signatures as valid, and that it dismissed the appeal from Bayron saying that the validation surpassed the nine-day limit as set by an earlier resolution by the commission, and that there were more invalid signatures than the commission's findings. According to the commission, out of a total of 32,418 signatures, 10,092 were invalidated, including 6,679 signatures from people who were not in the voters' list and 3,203 multiple entries. Furthermore, Bayron failed to issue his objections on other signatures during the validation process. On April 12, Bayron supporters filed a plunder complaint against Hagedorn, for alleged cash disbursements made by the city to Hagedorn totaling 65.7 million pesos between 2008 and 2010 when Hagedorn was in office. Hagedorn responded that the case is "nothing but a scrap of political harassment."

== Campaign ==
Due to the recall election, voter registration for the 2016 general election was suspended in Puerto Princesa from April 20 to May 17, 2015, as the Voters' Registration Act prohibits voter registration prior to a recall election. Candidacies were submitted from April 21 to 22, while the campaign period would be from April 23 to May 6, and the election itself would be on May 8.

On the first day of filing for candidacies, Hagedorn filed his certificate of candidacy. Election officer Orlando Baalan was looking into the possibility of asking the Philippine National Police to increase its presence in the city due to the election.

After the filing of candidacies was over, 45 people registered their intention to run; Bayron, as the incumbent, was automatically a candidate in the recall election. By May 5, six candidates backed out, leaving 37 candidates remaining; meanwhile President Benigno Aquino III declared election day as a holiday in Puerto Princesa.

A day later, further withdrawals reduced the total to 22 candidates. Several of the candidates who withdrew had surnames starting in letters C, D and F, and had allegedly been bribed to register in order to bring down Hagedorn's name on the ballot. The ballot, which is alphabetical order, has Bayron's name listed first. A group of thirteen candidates who withdrew alleged that they were unknowingly duped into running by signing some documents from a supposed pro-poor organization, and were paid 500 pesos as transport fare, only to find out later via the radio that they were candidates in the election, and that they could face incarceration. The candidates who withdrew also included people who were too young to run for mayor. Meanwhile, another 17 candidates were disqualified for not being residents of Puerto Princesa.

On election day, there were 29 candidates left, with Bayron of the United Nationalist Alliance (UNA) and Hagedorn of the Liberal Party as the frontrunners. Election commissioners Christian Robert Lim and Arthur Lim supervised the conduct of the elections, which went by without untoward incidents. Up to election day, there were no untoward incidents, despite text messages circulating in the city that tell of "casualties" among the candidates; the commission said there were no confirmation of such events, and that no violence was recorded.

== Results ==
The election started on 7:00 a.m. and ended 3:00 p.m. Manual counting of votes proceeded immediately at the polling precincts. Region IV Election Director Juanito Icarod said that the proclamation of candidates could either happen on election night or the day after, depending on what happens at the counting stage, such as protests or objections. A combined force of the Philippine National Police and the Philippine Marines kept the peace on election day.

After he voted, Bayron urged Congress to amend the recall elections law, citing the recall election as a "disturbance". He cited the low threshold of getting valid signatures as the culprit. He also denied that the election is a "proxy war" between UNA and the Liberal Party, saying that UNA didn't give him support; he noted the local nature of the election, calling it like as a "Pacquiao-Mayweather battle royale".

The Legal Network for Truthful Elections earlier noted the allegations of disenfranchisement and vote-buying during the election. While the commission said that those who were not in the voters list were either most likely had their registration deactivated for failing to vote in two consecutive elections, or were not registered in the first place, they will look into the allegations of vote-buying. Commissioner Christian Robert Lim said that they had no power to arrest those who were openly buying and selling votes without an arrest warrant.

After the counts were finished at the polling precincts, the ballot boxes containing the results were transported to the Victoriano J. Rodriguez Multi-Purpose Hall at the provincial capitol shortly before 6:00 p.m. However, tabulation there did not start until after two hours later when other ballot boxes arrived from the outlying barangays. The tabulation was headed by Batangas provincial election supervisor Gloria G. Ramos-Petallo. Hagedorn supporters camped outside of the provincial capitol, protesting the suspected tampered ballot boxes and other irregularities. Hours later, Petallo was heard by observers that Hagedorn filed a petition stopping the proclamation. However, there was no evidence given on the supposed questionable election returns. By 9:30 p.m., a commotion broke out outside the tabulation area when teachers, who were also election officers, complained that they were tired already. On 6:30 a.m. the next day, Petallo denied Hagedorn's petition. After ten hours, the commission proclaimed Bayron as the winner. Bayron said that he was open with reconciling with Hagedorn. Hagedorn, on the other hand, did not immediately issue a statement; his campaign manager, Nardz Villafranca, said that "We've seen the worst. Vote buying was rampant and visible." Villafranca later said that they would no longer challenge the result after being denied.

2015 Puerto Princesa mayoral recall election
Candidate	Party	Votes	%
Lucilo Bayron	United Nationalist Alliance	44,299	53.18
Edward Hagedorn	Liberal Party	39,002	46.82
27 other candidates	Independent	0	0.00
Total		83,301	100.00
Registered voters/turnout		127,162	65.50
Majority		5,297	6.36
United Nationalist Alliance hold			

After his proclamation, Bayron expressed confidence on his chances, saying that "I knew I was going to win. I was even expecting a wider margin." Bayron lambasted the new city police chief who was installed at the height of the campaign, despite the mayor's protests. Bayron accused him of partisanship. Bayron won narrowly at the barangays at the city proper, while he managed to win in some of the outlying barangays, which was widely considered to be Hagedorn's stronghold.

Only Bayron and Hagedorn received votes among the 29 candidates.

== Reactions ==
The election itself was seen by political strategist Malou Tiquia as a proxy war between the Liberal Party and the United Nationalist Alliance for the 2016 general election. Meanwhile, political analyst and University of Santo Tomas professor Edmund Tayao sees that Hagedorn's support for a presidential candidate would be "a plus," but not as considerable like the more populated areas such as Metro Manila, Pangasinan, Bulacan and Cebu.

Election watchdogs were generally satisfied with the conduct of the election. In a statement, the Legal Network for Truthful Elections (LENTE) said that

The canvassing went very well. It took ten hours. Delay was due to a lot of petitions for exclusion by the lawyers of the two main candidates in the recall. Petitions were primarily based on missing inner paper seal, missing statistical data, missing thumbmarks and allegations of fraud, tampering of the ERs (election returns).

== Aftermath ==
Regularly scheduled elections for all elected posts in the Philippines above the barangay level were held on May 9, 2016. Bayron successfully defended his mayoral post on that election against Hagedorn, and won by an even larger margin. Hagedorn said that he will leave town and retire from politics. Bayron won a third term in 2019, defeating vice mayor Luis Marcaida III. Maracaida was supported by Hagedorn, who filed a vote-buying complaint against Bayron. While he expected the charge, Bayron said he was no longer expecting to be reconciled with the Hagedorns.

In 2022, Hagedorn apologized to Bayron, who then endorsed the former in his campaign for Congress. Bayron originally endorsed Hagedorn's opponent, incumbent Gil Acosta Jr. Bayron, who was allowed to run for a fourth term after his tenure was interrupted when he was suspended in 2017, won the election. Hagedorn defeated Acosta, and took his seat as representative from Palawan's 3rd district, of which Puerto Princesa is a part of. Hagedorn was later convicted in 2023 by the Sandiganbayan of malversation on a case filed by Bayron. Hagedorn died later that year.
