= Edward Hagedorn =

Filipino politician (1946–2023)

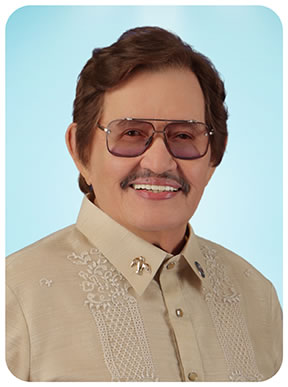
- Official portrait, 2022

Member of the House of Representatives from Palawan's 3rd district
- In office June 30, 2022 – October 3, 2023
- Preceded by: Gil Acosta Jr.
- Succeeded by: Gil Acosta Jr.

Mayor of Puerto Princesa
- In office November 12, 2002 – June 30, 2013
- Vice Mayor: Fernando U. Batul (2002–2003) Lucilo R. Bayron (2003–2013)
- Preceded by: Victorino Dennis Socrates
- Succeeded by: Lucilo R. Bayron
- In office June 30, 1992 – June 30, 2001
- Vice Mayor: Mil Miguel R. Reynoso (1992–1995) Ceferino S. Dimalanta (1995–1998) Vicky T. De Guzman (1998–2001)
- Preceded by: Feliberto R. Oliveros
- Succeeded by: Victorino Dennis Socrates

Personal details
- Born: Edward Solon Hagedorn; October 12, 1946 Parañaque, Rizal, Philippines
- Died: October 3, 2023 (aged 76) Puerto Princesa, Philippines
- Party: PDP–Laban (2021–2023); Liberal (2015–2021); Independent (2012–2015); NPC (2001–2012); Lakas–NUCD (1992–2001)
- Spouse: Maria Elena Marcelo
- Children: 2
- Education: St. Andrew's School; San Sebastian College – Recoletos; University of the East

Edward Solon Hagedorn (October 12, 1946 – October 3, 2023) was a Filipino politician who was the mayor of Puerto Princesa, Philippines, and later the representative of Palawan's 3rd congressional district.

Hagedorn, also an environmentalist and anti-mining advocate, served as city mayor of Puerto Princesa for two decades, only interrupted by a year since the Constitution set the limit at three consecutive three-year terms. He was first elected in 1992 and served until 2001 when he ran for governor of Palawan and lost; but was elected mayor again through the 2002 recall election, whose victory was later allowed by the Supreme Court, and continued to serve until 2013. He lost in his attempts in later elections, in Senate in 2013, as well as returning to mayorship in a 2015 recall and in 2016. In 2022, he was elected representative of Palawan's 3rd legislative district.

Hagedorn's leadership was directed towards establishing harmony between the environment and development. The mayor was credited with establishing the city as a model of eco-tourism for the country.

His leadership was noted for Puerto Princesa, the capital of Palawan, being declared in 2007 a highly urbanized city, thus independent of the province; and for the Puerto Princesa Subterranean River National Park being included in the New 7 Wonders of Nature.

== Early life and education ==
Edward Hagedorn was born on October 12, 1946, in Parañaque (then a municipality under Rizal), to Alexander Hagedorn, from Concepcion, Tarlac and of German descent, and Gliceria Solon of Cebu. He was the youngest of the six children. His paternal grandfather, Hans Josef Hagedorn, was an engineer from Germany, came to the country in the early 1900s.

He studied at the St. Andrew's School, San Sebastian College – Recoletos and University of the East in Manila; however, did not finish a college degree as he dropped out.

His family later moved to Palawan, where he worked in his father's logging business and in a small club in Puerto Princesa.

== Political career ==
=== As city mayor (1992–2001, 2002–2013) ===
Hagedorn, had been an environment advocate since the 1980s, started his political career in 1992 when he was first elected mayor of Puerto Princesa and served three consecutive terms until 2001. Initially seeking the vice mayoralty post, he eventually decided to run for mayor, defeating the incumbent Feliberto "Bert" Oliveros Jr., who had been in office for about 27 years.

He was a Lakas–NUCD member at that time. He was forbidden by the Constitution from running for another term in 2001. He then ran for governor of Palawan, but lost.

Hagedorn ran for city mayor in the 2002 recall election initiated by barangay officials against the incumbent mayor who replaced him, Victorino Dennis Socrates, whom he later defeated along with another opponent. On November 12, the Supreme Court, in its landmark decision, voted to allow both Hagedorn's candidacy and the proclamation; the court ruled that term limit is applied only in regular elections, special ones are exempted. His victory in that election, while not being considered by the court a re-election, was not also counted as a fourth term, and by the Commission on Elections as a first term; the reason of the latter to qualify him to run for the third term in 2010. He then served until 2013.

While in office, Hagedorn served as vice chairperson of Southern Philippines Council for Peace and Development (SPCPD) and member of Consultative Assembly, both were among the now-defunct transitional bodies created by President Fidel Ramos (Executive Order No. 371) as part of the 1996 Final Peace Agreement with SPCPD focused on development efforts in an area which covered the original local entities identified in the Tripoli Agreement, including Palawan, in preparation for supposed full autonomy; he later resigned in 2000 along with two other officials.

Hagedorn also served simultaneously as mayor; in the national executive committee of the League of Cities of the Philippines as representative for Region IV and later as chairperson; and member of National Executive Board of Boy Scouts of the Philippines. He also became a member of the Palawan Council for Sustainable Development.

On July 7, 2005, Hagedorn was appointed by President Gloria Arroyo as concurrent "anti-jueteng czar" to handle the government's initiative against corruption and illegal gambling. In his two-month campaign, he then created a legalized, government gambling counterpart called the Small Town Lottery.

==== Accomplishments ====
His administration enforced policies and programs, mainly in environmental management as well as community-centered development. Reforms were made in Puerto Princesa, especially within his first four years in office.

The city gained popularity, as it became a major eco-tourism destination and a model in environmental protection. In 1996, it was placed in the Hall of Fame for being the country's "cleanest and greenest" component city.

The city was transformed into the country's safest, with the lowest crime rate, mainly due to decrease of smuggling and illegal logging, both related to his advocacy of environmental activities. This resulted to, among other things, an increase of forest cover to over 2,000 hectares. On the other hand, the city was successfully made jueteng-free by 2003.

Hagedorn was an advocate of the Bantay Dagat program, initially implemented in Palawan and later adopted in other areas in the country following a legislation. He was also responsible for another law in which the city's move of declaring a state of calamity without the president's announcement was eventually adapted nationwide, thus allowing local government units to do so, which was enacted to support his initiative of stopping kaingin (slash and burn). As mayor, he had to use the calamity fund to provide alternative livelihood for affected farmers, the subject of later criminal charges which was then dismissed upon enactment of the said law.

It was also during his term when the Puerto Princesa Underground River (PPUR) was declared as a national park, and later, a UNESCO World Heritage Site. In 2011, PPUR was declared one of the New 7 Wonders of Nature, triggering a growth in the tourism business, particularly in tourist arrivals. The same year, the city was declared by the Association of Southeast Asian Nations as the region's first carbon-neutral city.

Also, Puerto Princesa became independent from the provincial government.

Under his leadership, Hagedorn received many awards for his innovative policies; the city government as well for good governance. Among others, the city was also named in 1994 the country's best managed local government; while he was given in 1997 the Global 500 Roll of Honour award by the United Nations Environment Programme.

Sometime in 2001, Hagedorn was reportedly criticized for leaving behind rough streets and for then unused ₱23-M helicopter.

==== Leadership initiatives ====
Accomplishing the city's vision, Hagedorn initiated the following projects:

- Oplan Linis Program (Clean and Green Campaign), launched in 1992;
- Bantay Puerto Program (Puerto Princesa Watch; Protect, Rehabilitate and Plan);
- Comprehensive Housing Program, for migrants;
- Livelihood Program (3Ks Program), 3K stands for Kalinisan, Kapayapaan, Kaunlaran (cleanliness, peace and order, economic development);
- Programs for agriculture, education, health, infrastructure and tourism;
- E-tricycle (electric tricycle) Program, launched in 2007 to reduce noise and carbon monoxide. On January 19, Hagedorn unveiled "Trikebayan" at the Kapihan sa Sulo forum, Sulo Hotel, Quezon City. The Trikebayan costs only ₱48 ($1.20) per day to operate, while that of a gasoline-powered one would cost ₱200. Rolly Concepcion, who conceptualized the Trikebayan, said that converting a tricycle engine to electric costs ₱68,000. The 36-watt rechargeable battery under the passenger seat can run for 12 hours.

=== Attempts in politics (2013–2022) ===
Hagedorn, then a member of the Nationalist People's Coalition, ran for senator, as an independent candidate, in 2013, but lost as he landed 18th.

In his attempts to regain the mayorship, Hagedorn, had been under Liberal Party, lost twice to incumbent Lucilo Bayron: in another recall election in 2015, organized by his camp; and in 2016.

=== As district representative (2022–2023) ===
In 2022, Hagedorn, ran under PDP–Laban, was elected Palawan 3rd district representative.

== Legal issues ==
Sometime during his first years in office, Hagedorn was charged of graft and corruption for supposed misuse of public funds, in connection with his initiative to stop kaingin; the case was later dismissed upon enactment of a law allowing local government units to declare state of calamities in their areas.

Another graft complaint against Hagedorn was filed by a group of vendors in connection with the planned privatization of two public markets and a slaughterhouse without bidding. Ombudsman Conchita Morales approved the dismissal of the case on December 15, 2016, citing lack of probable cause.

In 2018, the Ombudsman filed a case against Hagedorn, acting on a 2016 complaint filed by Bayron, alleging the former's failure to return 14 of 20 government-issued Armalite rifles at the end of his mayoral term. On June 30, 2023, the Sandiganbayan convicted Hagedorn of malversation of public property, sentencing him to 2–7 years of imprisonment, and perpetually disqualifying him from holding public office. The court dismissed his defense that the firearms were eventually already returned to the city Philippine National Police in 2017, which was later affirmed by the police, saying that the delay in turnover still makes him liable, citing a Supreme Court decision. Hagedorn reportedly was to appeal the decision with the Supreme Court.

== Personal life ==
Hagedorn married Ma. Elena Marcelo, a high school teacher; they had two children as well as six grandsons.

Hagedorn and his successor, Lucilo Bayron, are relatives by marriage; Bayron is Ma. Elena's brother-in-law. In 2013, Bayron, then incumbent vice mayor, defeated Ma. Elena in the city mayoral election.

His elder brother, Douglas (March 7, 1945 – April 25, 2021), served as the first representative of Palawan's 3rd district (2013–2016). He had been in politics since 1986 when he became the chairperson of the city's Association of Barangay Captains and Liga ng mga Barangay, thus becoming an ex-officio Sangguniang Panlungsod (city council) member and the city's longest-serving barangay chairperson, leading San Miguel; these positions, along with being an ex-officio member of the Provincial Board, were held until 2010.

Hagedorn revealed in a 1996 report his life prior to entering politics, including being a leader of a street gang with three other brothers as also members, prior to moving to Palawan; an illegal gambling operator; and his involvement in crimes. He was arrested, but cleared, for accusations of murder; while his trial for forgery was canceled when records for his case were among those destroyed in a fire at the city hall. He then became a born-again Christian. He owned a restaurant in the city.

== Illness and death ==
Hagedorn publicly announced that he was diagnosed with pancreatic cancer in February 2023. He died eight months later, on October 3, at the age of 76 and 9 days before his 77th birthday.

== In popular culture ==
- Hagedorn was the subject of a biopic titled Hagedorn in which he was portrayed by Fernando Poe Jr. in 1996.
