= 2002 Puerto Princesa mayoral recall election =

Philippine election

- September 24, 2002
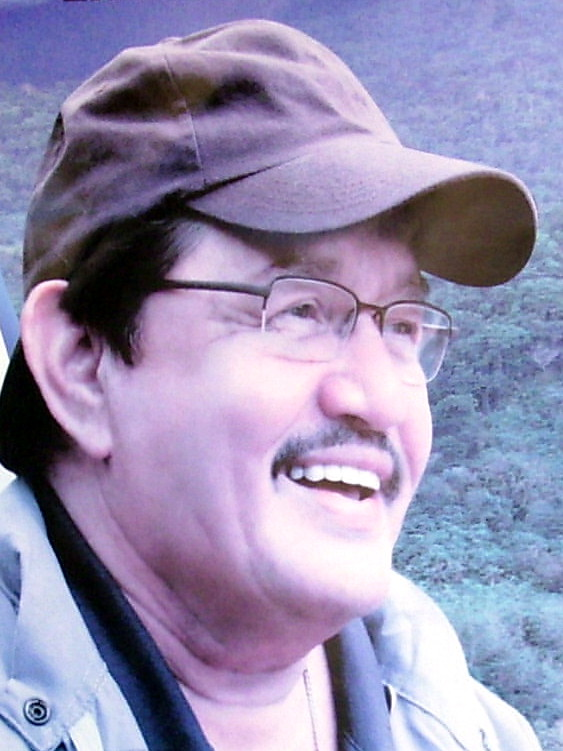

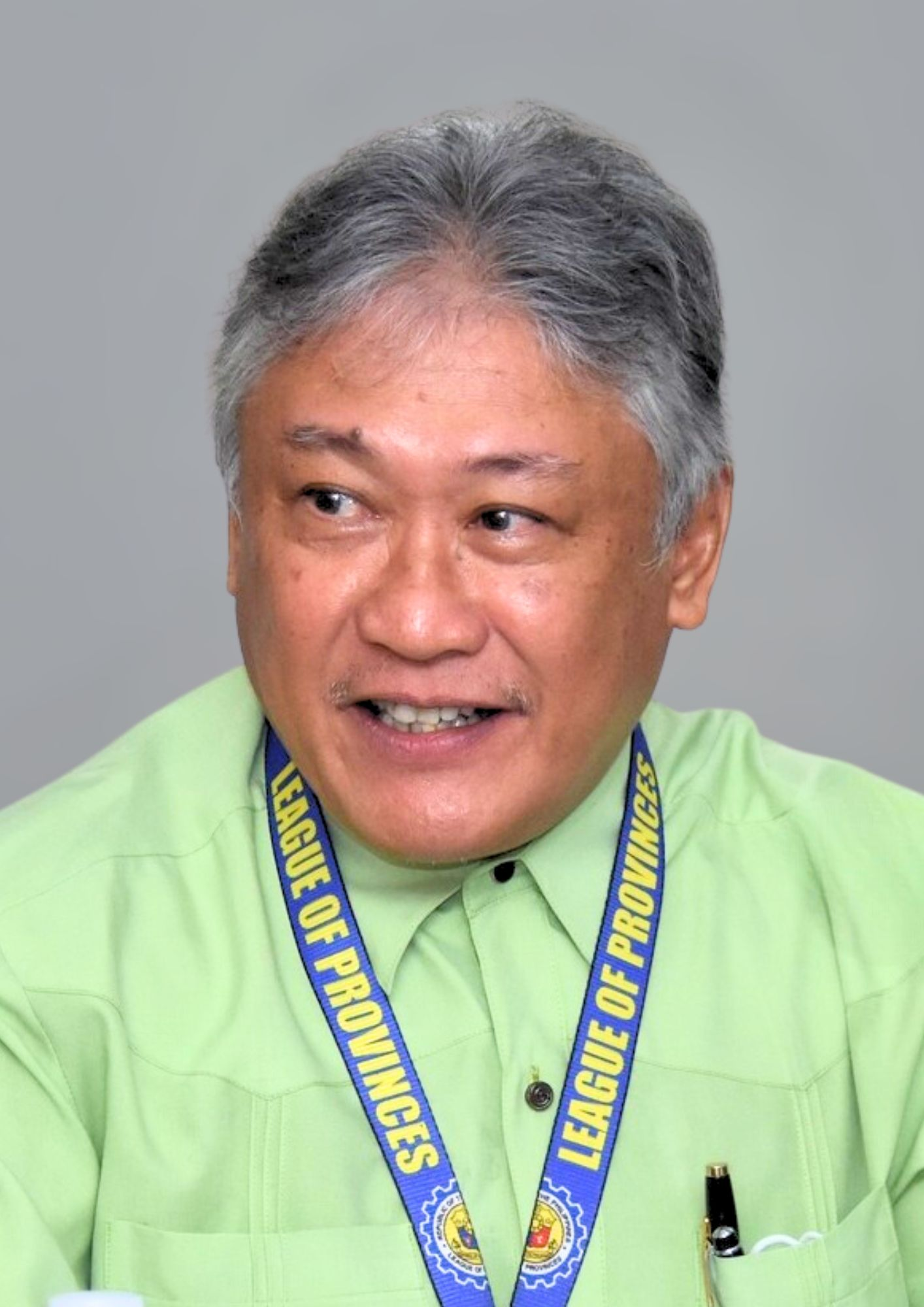

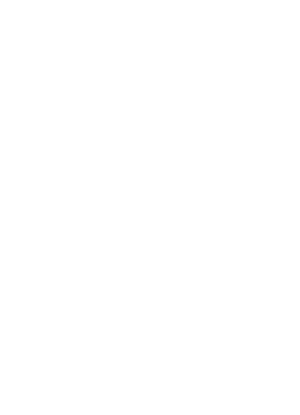
| Candidate | Edward Hagedorn | Victorino Dennis Socrates | Sandy Sandoval |
| Party | PnM | Lakas | Independent |
| Popular vote | 20,238 | 17,220 | 13,241 |
| Percentage | 39.92 | 33.97 | 26.12 |
Mayor before election
Victorino Dennis Socrates
Lakas
Mayor-elect
Edward Hagedorn
PnM

The 2002 Puerto Princesa mayoral recall election was held on September 24, 2002, in the city of Puerto Princesa, Palawan, Philippines. Former mayor Edward Hagedorn defeated incumbent Victorino Dennis Socrates in the recall election.

== Electoral system ==
Recall elections are allowed by Republic Act No. 7160 or the Local Government Code of the Philippines. A recall can be initiated by a petition of at least 25% of the registered voters in the local government unit (LGU) concerned. A resolution from a preparatory recall assembly composed of all of the elected local officials in the LGU concerned is another method of initiating a recall election. An official could be subjected to a recall only once during one's term of office, and from one year after the official took office, up to one year before the next regularly scheduled election. For local officials elected in 2001, they can only be recalled from June 30, 2002 to May 10, 2003.

City mayors are elected via first-past-the-post voting.

== Background ==
In the Philippines, local officials are term limited after being elected for three consecutive three-year terms. Then Puerto Princesa mayor Edward Hagedorn was term limited in the 2001 election, and his handpicked successor Diomedes de Guzman lost to lawyer Victorino Dennis Socrates, son of Palawan governor Salvador Socrates, who went missing after his plane crashed in the Sulu Sea in 2000. Hagedorn himself lost in the Palawan gubernatorial election.

On July 2, 2002, or barely a year after Socrates took office, a preparatory recall assembly, composed of elected barangay (village) officials, passed a resolution to hold a recall election against him. The assembly said there were 386 participants, but the official signatories were later cleared to be 346. The assembly chairman, Mark David Hagedorn, who was also the City Association Barangay President, was escorted out of the proceedings when there was a motion to declare him "out of order". Hagedorn estimated there were only about 260 participants in the meeting. The assembly was convened after Socrates issued a statement that attending to barangay matters is a "stupid function". The barangay officials also cited significant reduction in their budgets. After the assembly, Socrates said in a press conference that it was all for show, and that former mayor Hagedorn and Sandy Sandoval connived with the barangay officials to hold the assembly, and that Congressman Abraham Mitra supported it.

== Campaign ==
The Commission on Elections set the recall election on September 7, after it dismissed a petition by Socrates nullifying the results of the preparatory recall assembly on August 11. The commission ruled that 312 members of the 528 barangay officials convened it, above the quorum needed. Hagedorn filed his candidacy and was confident that the election will push through.

Two days before the election, the Supreme Court rescheduled the recall to September 24, after granting the petition of Socrates and Sandoval, who argued that the campaigning period was too short. On election eve, Hagedorn's supporters showed their support for him on a motorcade, while Socrates' supporters attended a rally at Mendoza park. The third candidate, engineer Sandy Sandoval, was silent. The commission also dismissed petitions to disqualify Hagedorn from the election. The commission ruled that since Hagedorn did not stand for election in 2001, he was not running for a fourth consecutive term. On election day, Socrates faced Hagedorn and Sandoval. A total of 73,470 registered voters would decide if Socrates would be recalled.

== Results ==
On election day, the Supreme Court granted a petition of three Puerto Princesa residents on not declaring a winner of the election until the court allowed them to. The temporary restraining order did not prevent the election from pushing through. Chairman Benjamin Abalos, said that he hoped it would not be misconstrued that they were favoring Hagedorn's opponents, as he is associated with deposed president Joseph Estrada. Tabulation of results still followed, and showed Hagedorn defeating both Socrates and Sandoval. Pending the court's ruling, Socrates would continue to serve as mayor.

By November 12, the Supreme Court lifted the restraining order preventing the commission from declaring Hagedorn the winner, after it ruled that Hagedorn could still stand in the recall election, as the three-term limit does not apply to elections outside of the regularly scheduled ones. Two of the justices dissented, notably Chief Justice Hilario Davide Jr. The court argued that Hagedorn was not running for "immediate re-election". The commission, in its headquarters at Palacio del Gobernador in Intramuros, Manila, subsequently proclaimed Hagedorn as the winner. Hagedorn asked both Socrates and Sandoval "Let’s avoid jeering and let us be united."

2002 Puerto Princesa mayoral recall election
| Candidate | Party | Votes | % |
|---|---|---|---|
| Edward Hagedorn | Puwersa ng Masa | 20,238 | 39.53 |
| Victorino Dennis Socrates | Lakas–NUCD–UMDP | 17,720 | 34.61 |
| Sandy Sandoval | Independent | 13,241 | 25.86 |
| Total | | 51,199 | 100.00 |
| Registered voters/turnout | | 73,470 | – |
| Majority | | 2,518 | 4.92 |
| Puwersa ng Masa gain from Lakas–NUCD–UMDP | | | |

== Aftermath ==
The method of using the preparatory recall assembly to initiate recall petitions was repealed under Republic Act No. 9244 in 2004.

Hagedorn served from 2002 to 2013, winning the 2004, 2007 and 2010 mayoral elections. It was questioned in the 2010 election if he was on his third term by then; it was dismissed and he was allowed to run.

Socrates later became House representative from Palawan's 2nd district. In 2012, he filed a bill removing the option of recall, citing attempts to recall then Palawan governor Abraham Mitra.

Meanwhile, Hagedorn was term limited anew in 2013, ran and lost in the Senate election. In 2015, he participated in another recall election, this time against Lucilo Bayron, who was his vice mayor from 2003 to 2013. Hagedorn failed to unseat Bayron in the 2015 recall election.

== See also ==
- 2015 Puerto Princesa mayoral recall election
