= Palawan Wildlife Rescue and Conservation Center =

Zoo in Puerto Princesa, Philippines

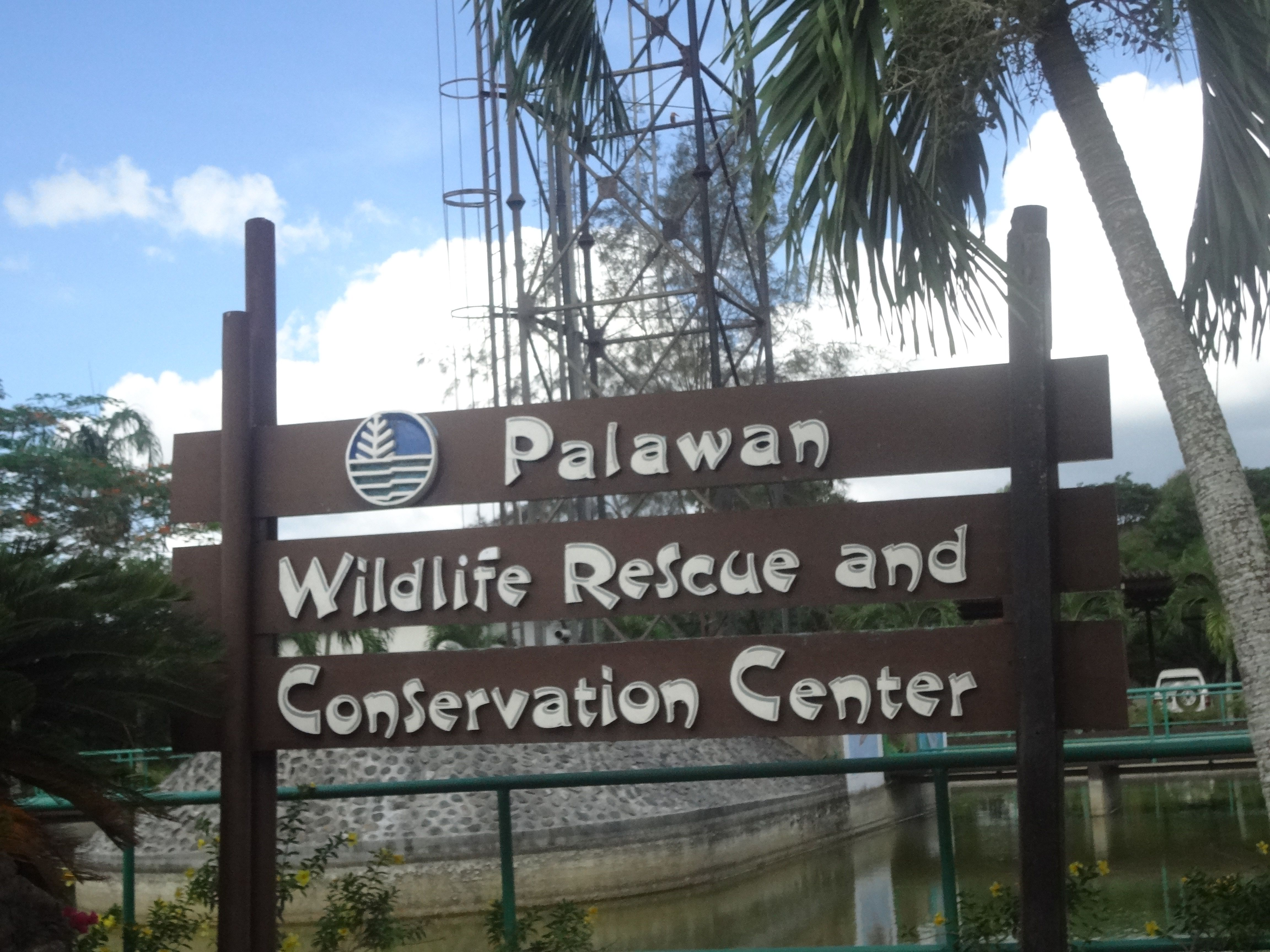
- Interactive map of Palawan Wildlife Rescue and Conservation Center
- Date opened: 1987
- Date closed: 9°47′57″N 118°41′38″E
- Location: Irawan, Puerto Princesa, Palawan, Philippines
- Land area: 10 hectares (25 acres)
- No. of animals: 1695+ (2021)
- Management: Natural Resource Development Corporation

The Palawan Wildlife Rescue and Conservation Center (PWRCC) is a wildlife rehabilitation and conservation facility and crocodile farm in Puerto Princesa, Palawan, Philippines.

== History ==
The Palawan Wildlife Rescue and Conservation Center (PWRCC) was established on August 20, 1987, as the Crocodile Farming Institute (CFI). A joint venture of the Philippine government's Department of Environment and Natural Resources (DENR) and the Japan International Cooperation Agency, the CFI is intended to facilitate the sustainable conservation of the Philippine crocodile and Saltwater crocodile as well as to promote crocodile farming to locals as a means of livelihood. The management of the facility was done by the DENR's Biodiversity Management Bureau (BMB)

In 2000, the CFI was renamed as the Palawan Wildlife Rescue and Conservation Center (PWRCC) through DENR Administrative Order 49. From 2002 to 2010, the Natural Resource Development Corporation (NRDC) took full control over the PWRCC. For 10 years the management of the PWRCC was taken care by the BMB, except the commercial aspect which was handled by the NRDC. In 2020, the PWRCC was once again reverted to the NRDC.

== Fauna and flora ==
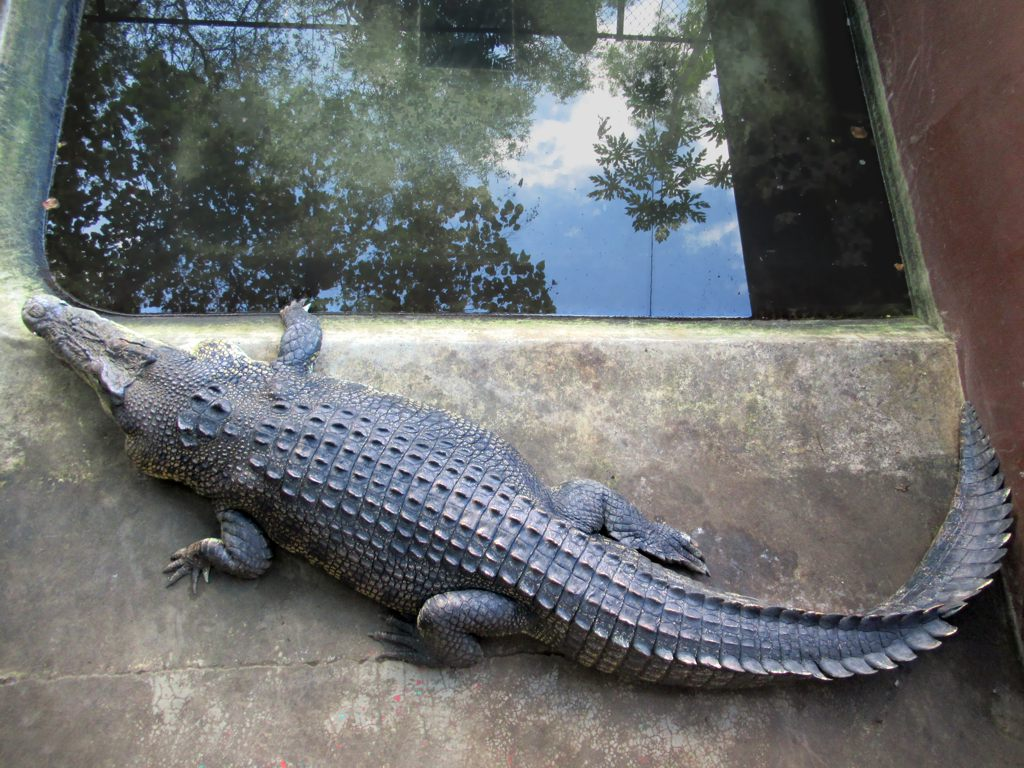
Saltwater crocodile in captivity at the PWRCC

Also known as the Crocodile Farm, the PWRCC is dedicated to keeping two endemic crocodile species in captivity – the Philippine crocodile (Crocodylus mindorensis) and the Saltwater crocodile (Crocodylus porosus). The facility has accreditation from the Convention on International Trade in Endangered Species (CITES) which it obtained on January 4, 1997, allowing it to sell Saltwater crocodiles for commercial purposes. While it is illegal for the center to sell Philippine crocodiles, Saltwater crocodiles are sometimes sold for their leather. It also hosts other animals and plants including Palawan endemic species. Some animals were temporarily kept in the facility for rehabilitation due to being found injured in the wild or seized by authorities from illegal captivity and are meant to be released back to the wild. Some animals are kept under long-term captivity in the PWRCC. The PWRCC is also open to the public and organizes informational tours. As of October 2021, the facility hosts 1,450 individual crocodiles and 245 other wild animals.

The PWRCC has four components:

- Crocodile Farming Institute
- Wildlife Rescue Center
- Ecological Destination Park
- PWRCC Training Center
