= Victorino Dennis Socrates =

Filipino politician

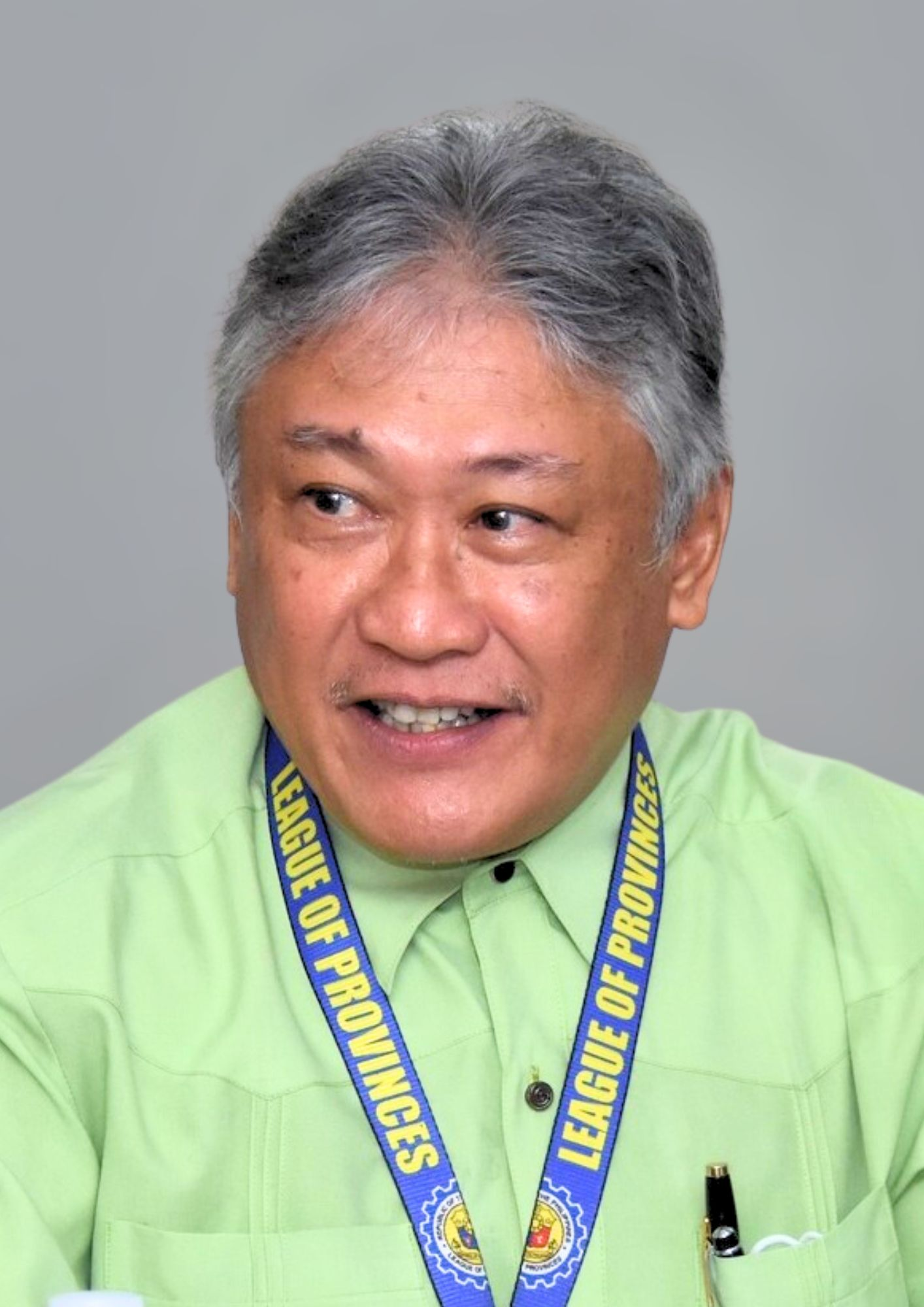

24th Governor of Palawan
- In office June 30, 2022 – June 30, 2025
- Vice Governor: Leoncio Ola
- Preceded by: Jose Chaves Alvarez
- Succeeded by: Amy Alvarez

Vice Governor of Palawan
- In office June 30, 2013 – June 30, 2022
- Governor: Jose Chaves Alvarez
- Preceded by: Clara Reyes
- Succeeded by: Leoncio Ola

Member of the House of Representatives from Palawan's 2nd district
- In office June 30, 2010 – June 30, 2013
- Preceded by: Abraham Mitra
- Succeeded by: Frederick Abueg

Mayor of Puerto Princesa
- In office June 30, 2001 – November 12, 2002
- Vice Mayor: Fernando U. Batul
- Preceded by: Edward Hagedorn
- Succeeded by: Edward Hagedorn

Personal details
- Born: September 21, 1961 (age 65) Cuyo, Palawan, Philippines
- Party: Aksyon (2024–present)
- Other political affiliations: PPPL (2015–2024); NUP (2012–2015); NPC (2009–2012); Lakas (2002–2009); Independent (2001–2002)
- Education: University of the Philippines Diliman (LL.B)

Victorino Dennis Macalinao Socrates (born September 21, 1961) is a Filipino lawyer and politician who was the governor of the province of Palawan from 2022 to 2025. Prior to this, he served as vice governor of Palawan from 2013 to 2022.

== Early life ==
Socrates is a lawyer by profession. He is the son of Salvador Socrates, a former governor of Palawan who died in a plane crash while in office in 2000. His sister, Maria Nancy Socrates, is a vice mayor of Puerto Princesa.

== Political career ==
He was a member of the House of Representatives representing the 2nd district of Palawan from 2010 to 2013. He also served as mayor of Puerto Princesa from 2001 to 2002, when he lost a recall election against former mayor Edward Hagedorn.

Socrates lost reelection for governor in 2025 to Amy Alvarez.
