= 2013 Philippine Senate election =

31st Philippine senatorial election

- May 13, 2013

12 (of the 24) seats to the Senate of the Philippines 13 seats needed for a majority
| Alliance | Team PNoy | UNA |
| Seats won | 9 | 3 |
| Popular vote | 175,716,460 | 90,808,675 |
| Percentage | 59.63% | 30.82% |
Senate President before election
Juan Ponce Enrile
UNA
Elected Senate President
Franklin Drilon
Liberal

The 31st election of members to the Senate of the Philippines was held on Monday, May 13, 2013, to elect 12 of the 24 seats in the Senate. The winners in this election joined the winners of the 2010 election to form the 16th Congress of the Philippines. The senators elected in 2010 will serve until June 30, 2016, while the senators elected in this election will serve up to June 30, 2019. The elections to the House of Representatives as well as local elections occurred on the same date. The Philippines use plurality-at-large voting for seats in the Senate: the twelve candidates with the highest number of votes win the twelve seats up for election. The Senate seat vacated by President Benigno Aquino III in 2010 was among the twelve seats to be put for election.

While the Philippines is a multi-party democracy since 1987, parties have not been able to complete a 12-candidate slate. This means parties have to form coalitions in order to complete a slate, this lessens the number of slates the voters have to choose for. In this election, the two coalitions that completed 12-candidate slates are Team PNoy led by the President Benigno Aquino III's Liberal Party, and the United Nationalist Alliance (UNA) of former president Joseph Estrada's Pwersa ng Masang Pilipino and Vice President Jejomar Binay's Partido Demokratiko Pilipino-Lakas ng Bayan; the two slates used to share three common candidates, until they were dropped by UNA.

Team PNoy banked on Aquino's popularity and was leading 9−3 in the surveys, with Loren Legarda emerged topping the Senate election for a record-tying third time. However, on the final weeks of the campaign, Legarda was accused of hiding assets abroad, a charge she vehemently denied. On election night, former Movie and Television Review and Classification Board chairperson Grace Poe, daughter of defeated 2004 presidential candidate Fernando Poe, Jr., emerged as the frontrunner. Poe, Legarda, and four others were proclaimed on May 16, and further proclamations were held until May 18. Team PNoy did win nine seats against UNA's three, with both coalitions winning at the expense of retiring or term-limited senators who were not members of either coalition. Team PNoy campaign manager and senator Franklin Drilon was elected Senate President upon the convening of the 16th Congress of the Philippines on late July, after emerging as the frontrunner in the Senate Presidency, at the expense of incumbent Juan Ponce Enrile of UNA.

== Electoral system ==
Philippine senatorial elections are done via the plurality-at-large voting system: the entire country is one at-large "district", where a voter can vote up to twelve people (one vote per candidate), with the twelve candidates with the highest number of votes deemed being elected. Senators who are currently serving their second consecutive term are term limited, although they may run again in 2016. Only half of the seats are up in every senatorial election.

Each party has a slate of as many candidates as it can muster, although they do not usually exceed a 12-person ticket. If a party cannot complete a full ticket, they may invite "guest candidates" to complete the ticket. They may even come other slates, and these guest candidates may not participate in electoral rallies by their adoptive party(ies), or may not cooperate at the Senate if elected. A coalition of different parties may be formed in cases where no party has the ability to complete a full ticket; a party may not include their entire slate on a coalition ticket. Independents may become guest candidates and be included in coalitions.

While the Philippines is a multi-party system, parties tend to group themselves into two major coalitions in midterm elections (Lakas-Laban vs NPC in 1995, PPC vs Puwersa ng Masa in 2001); sometimes a third, but weaker, coalition is formed. This is opposed to senatorial elections in presidential election years where most presidential candidates also have senatorial slates. This results in an election where voters can choose between two major political forces.

Winning candidates are proclaimed by the Commission on Elections (COMELEC) sitting as the National Board of Canvassers. Candidates are proclaimed senators-elect if the thirteenth place candidate no longer has a mathematical chance of surpassing that candidate. Post-proclamation disputes are handled by the Senate Electoral Tribunal, a body composed of six senators and three justices from the Supreme Court.

=== Thirteenth Senate seat ===
On December 12, 2011, incumbent Senator Miriam Defensor Santiago was elected as a Judge of the International Criminal Court. As a result, she was expected to vacate her Senate seat after the impeachment trial of Chief Justice Renato Corona, which ended on May 29, 2012, a year before the 2013 election.

Once Santiago vacates her Senate seat, an additional senator would be elected in the upcoming election to serve the remaining three years of her unexpired term. However, the likelihood of a thirteenth Senator being elected became low though since Santiago has already stated that she will not quit her seat.

== Background ==
As the 2010 Senate election was held concurrently with the presidential election, most of the presidential candidates also put up their respective senatorial slates. These slates shared several candidates, although most of the shared candidates only campaigned with one slate. The presidential election was won by Liberal Party's Benigno Aquino III, defeating Joseph Estrada of the Pwersa ng Masang Pilipino. Meanwhile, the vice presidential election was won by Estrada's running mate, Jejomar Binay of the Partido Demokratiko Pilipino—Lakas ng Bayan.

The Senate election resulted in a chamber where no party had more than four seats. Outgoing Senate President Juan Ponce Enrile of PMP emerged as a compromise candidate in the election for Senate President when Liberal Party candidate Franklin Drilon could not muster the majority of votes in the Senate against defeated presidential candidate Manuel Villar of the Nacionalista Party. In the Senate Presidential election, Enrile defeated Alan Peter Cayetano, a Nacionalista. Aside from Cayetano and Enrile voting for each other, only Cayetano's sister Pilar Juliana "Pia" Cayetano and Ceferino "Joker" Arroyo voted against Enrile; the three then constituted the Senate's minority bloc. Thus, most of the competing political forces in the 2010 election were united within the Senate for most of the 15th Congress.

== Coalitions ==
=== United Nationalist Alliance ===
The Pwersa ng Masang Pilipino and PDP—Laban parties signed a coalition agreement on April 4, 2012 for the 2013 elections, forming the United Nationalist Alliance (UNA). The two parties were former partners in the United Opposition in the 2007 election, and Estrada and Binay were running mates during the 2010 presidential election. PDP—Laban president Aquilino "Koko" Pimentel III has stated that UNA's senatorial slate was more than twelve members and was in the process of trimming down; he had also expressed reservations on the inclusion of Migz Zubiri, of whom he had won an election protest after the 2007 election.

On May 3, 2012, Zubiri took an oath as a member of PMP. Estrada and Binay were optimistic that Pimentel and Zubiri will be able to reconcile their differences prior to the start of the campaign. Seven days later, UNA announced its first five senatorial candidates: incumbent senators Koko Pimentel and Gregorio Honasan, Cagayan Representative Jack Enrile, San Juan Representative JV Ejercito, and 2010 senatorial candidate Joey de Venecia. On June 11, 2012, UNA formally included Zubiri in its line-up, together with Cebu Governor Gwendolyn Garcia and Zambales Representative Mitos Magsaysay.

On June 28, 2012, Pimentel officially declined his spot in the UNA line-up, citing Zubiri's continued inclusion. A week later, the commission accredited UNA as a political coalition, although it may face opposition from the use of the "UNA" acronym from the United Negros Alliance, a local political party from Negros Occidental.

The UNA announced in August that former senators Richard J. Gordon and Ernesto Maceda were a part of their ticket, and that Senator Loren Legarda would be one of the last three candidates yet to be named in their ticket. UNA spokesperson JV Bautista also said that Pimentel had taken a leave of absence as PDP—Laban president, and that PDP—Laban would not issue Pimentel's certificate of nomination as the latter was running under the Liberal Party ticket. However, Pimentel denied taking leave of absence from the PDP—Laban presidency.

On the first day of filing of certificates of candidacies, UNA' senatorial nominees filed theirs at the Commission on Elections national offices at Intramuros. Joey de Venecia withdrew from the election as he cited his business endeavors as reasons for his withdrawal; speculation was rife when Lorenzo Tañada III was one of the persons considered to fill in de Venecia's slot in the ticket, but Binay disclosed that Tañada was not in their choices "any more." On October 4, UNA announced that Binay's daughter Nancy was their 12th nominee.

After perennial non-attendance of the three common candidates shared with Team PNoy, UNA announced on February 21 that they dropped the three from the ticket. UNA secretary-general Toby Tiangco cited Team PNoy's campaign manager Franklin Drilon's refusal to allow the three to participate in their campaign.

=== Team PNoy ===
The Liberal Party was open on creating coalitions or alliances with other parties for the 2013 election, as long as the politicians have the same principles as them. Secretary of Budget and Management Florencio Abad said on April 7, 2012 that it was too early to make conclusions. Two days later, the Liberals revealed 14 names of possible candidates on their ticket; these include candidates that were being considered on the UNA ticket. This meant there may be common names on both tickets.

In April 2012, the Nacionalista Party was choosing between UNA and the LP tickets, with party secretary-general Alan Peter Cayetano saying that it was too early to decide on such matters. The verdict in the impeachment of Renato Corona would affect their decision.

On May 17, 2012, Aquino revealed the party's four senatorial bets: Aurora Representative Sonny Angara, TESDA Chairman Joel Villanueva, and 2010 senatorial candidates Risa Hontiveros and Ruffy Biazon. All four, however, were still considering their options to run for the Senate. On June 28, 2012, party vice chairman Senator Franklin Drilon announced the candidacy of former Senator Ramon Magsaysay Jr.

Senator Francis Escudero, who formerly campaigned for the Nationalist People's Coalition's presidential nomination in 2010 before resigning from the party and withdrawing from the race abruptly, said he believed that the NPC and the Liberals "are in coalition with one another."

It was announced on July 5, 2012, that the ruling Liberal Party (LP), NPC and Nacionalista Party would most likely field a common senatorial ticket in the May 2013 elections. A meeting between Aquino and Villar agreed to coalesce for the 2013 elections, and details, such as local candidates, will be dealt upon on further meetings. Drilon cautioned though that the agreement was "not yet sealed" as the distribution of slots in the ticket will also be a factor. The Nacionalistas had already endorsed four candidates: Senators Antonio Trillanes and Alan Peter Cayetano, and Representatives Robert Ace Barbers and Cynthia Villar.

However, NPC official and Senator Tito Sotto in September said that the three-party coalition might not be pursued as the determination of candidates at the local level remain as stumbling blocks in the formation of the coalition; NPC has more local officials than LP and NP. Meanwhile, Representative Mark Villar, a Nacionalista, said that they will stay put with their coalition agreement with LP, and that most issues have already been resolved.

Bam Aquino, the president's cousin, and former Senator Jamby Madrigal, a defeated presidential candidate in 2010, were sworn in as Liberal Party members. On October 1, President Aquino announced the administration coalition's nominees in a speech at Club Filipino. The ruling coalition, aside from the LP, NP and NPC, included the Laban ng Demokratikong Pilipino and Akbayan.

The three candidates common with both coalitions, namely Francis Escudero, Grace Poe and Loren Legarda went with the ruling party's proclamation rally. The three candidates were given instructions by the party leaders not to appear in the sorties of the rival coalition.

Abaya also announced that Senator Franklin Drilon will serve as their campaign manager. However, Loren Legarda, when asked with whom she will campaign with, said "I will campaign with the Filipino people."

=== Makabayan coalition ===
In June 2012, Bayan Muna Representative Teodoro Casiño announced his senatorial candidacy, and stated that his progressive Makabayang Koalisyon ng Mamamayan (Patriotic Coalition of the People) was "in touch" with the leaders of the United Nationalist Alliance to join their slate, and that joining the Liberal-led ticket would be difficult as he has significant political differences with President Aquino. He was also amenable on rejoining the Nacionalista Party ticket which included candidates from the Makabayan coalition in the 2010 election, or running on his own. UNA spokesperson Toby Tiangco said that he was unaware of any talks between UNA and Makabayan. However, on September, Casiño announced that he not joining either ticket, saying that the coalition reached a consensus on the matter to prevent him from being beholden from other politicians.

On November 8, Makabayan announced the adoption of five guest candidates: Loren Legarda, Francis Escudero, Koko Pimentel, Cynthia Villar and Grace Poe. The six candidates of Makabayan would pursue a progressive agenda. On April 28, 2013, Makabayan further adopted the candidacies of Alan Peter Cayetano and Jamby Madrigal to add to their progressive senatorial slate. A week later, Ramon Magsaysay Jr. received Makabayan's endorsement on May 5.

=== Other coalitions, parties and independents ===
The other parties' tickets which were allowed by the commission to run were Ang Kapatiran, the Bangon Pilipinas Party, the Democratic Party of the Philippines, the Social Justice Society and several independents. Independents Edward Hagedorn and Ramon Montaño, and Ang Kapatiran candidates were included in the first batch of approved candidacies, while the candidates of the Democratic Party, of the Social Justice Society, and independent Ricardo Penson were approved on the second batch.

The Centrist Democratic Party of the Philippines, headed by Cagayan de Oro representative Rufus Rodriguez did not name candidates for the election; they instead endorsed Francis Escudero, Koko Pimentel and Bam Aquino, all candidates of Team PNoy.

The People's Champ Movement, headed by Sarangani representative and Filipino boxing athlete Manny Pacquiao endorsed the entire United Nationalist Alliance ticket and endorsed the candidacies of Bangon Pilipinas Party senatorial candidate Eddie Villanueva and Team PNoy senatorial candidate Bam Aquino for the general election.

Lakas–CMD, the former ruling party which did not named candidates under their banner, endorsed the candidacies of Nancy Binay and Dick Gordon of UNA, Eddie Villanueva of Bangon Pilipinas, and Cynthia Villar from Team PNoy, Leyte Representative Ferdinand Martin Romualdez announced on mid-April. This completed the list which earlier included JV Ejercito, Jack Enrile, Gregorio Honasan and Mitos Magsaysay from UNA, and Sonny Angara and Grace Poe from Team PNoy. Since there are only ten names, the party instructed local officials to endorse two from Tingting Cojuangco, Ernesto Maceda and Migz Zubiri of UNA, and Loren Legarda from Team PNoy, to complete their preferred 12-candidate slate.

=== Summary ===
| Coalition | Member parties | Notes on member parties | Leader | (Potential) leader at the Senate |
|---|---|---|---|---|
| Ang Kapatiran | Ang Kapatiran | | Reynaldo Pacheco | John Carlos de los Reyes |
| Bangon Pilipinas | Bangon Pilipinas | | Eddie Villanueva | Eddie Villanueva |
| DPP | DPP | | Baldomero Falcone | Baldomero Falcone |
| Makabayang Koalisyon ng Mamamayan | Bayan Muna | Only running in the party-list election | Rafael V. Mariano | Teodoro Casiño |
| Makabayang Koalisyon ng Mamamayan | Anakpawis | Only running in the party-list election | Rafael V. Mariano | Teodoro Casiño |
| Makabayang Koalisyon ng Mamamayan | GABRIELA | Only running in the party-list election | Rafael V. Mariano | Teodoro Casiño |
| Makabayang Koalisyon ng Mamamayan | Kabataan | Only running in the party-list election | Rafael V. Mariano | Teodoro Casiño |
| Makabayang Koalisyon ng Mamamayan | ACT-Teachers | Only running in the party-list election | Rafael V. Mariano | Teodoro Casiño |
| Makabayang Koalisyon ng Mamamayan | Katribu | Only running in the party-list election | Rafael V. Mariano | Teodoro Casiño |
| Social Justice Society | Social Justice Society | | Samson Alcantara | Samson Alcantara |
| Team PNoy | Liberal | | Benigno Aquino III | Franklin Drilon |
| Team PNoy | Nacionalista | | Manuel Villar | Alan Peter Cayetano |
| Team PNoy | NPC | Excludes one candidate running with UNA | Eduardo Cojuangco, Jr. | Tito Sotto |
| Team PNoy | LDP | | Edgardo Angara | Sonny Angara |
| Team PNoy | Akbayan | | Ronald Llamas | Risa Hontiveros |
| Team PNoy | NUP | No senatorial candidates | Pablo P. Garcia | —N/a |
| Team PNoy | PDP–Laban | Excludes candidates running under the UNA banner | Aquilino Pimentel III | Aquilino Pimentel III |
| United Nationalist Alliance | PDP–Laban | Excludes one candidate running with Team PNoy; all others running under the UNA banner | Collective leadership: Jejomar Binay; Joseph Estrada; Juan Ponce Enrile | Koko Pimentel (with Team PNoy) |
| United Nationalist Alliance | PMP | All candidates running under the UNA banner | Collective leadership: Jejomar Binay; Joseph Estrada; Juan Ponce Enrile | Juan Ponce Enrile |
| United Nationalist Alliance | NPC | Excludes one candidate running with Team PNoy | Eduardo Cojuangco, Jr. | Tito Sotto |

== Term-limited incumbents and other changes ==
The following are barred from running since they are on their second consecutive six-year term:

1. Edgardo Angara (LDP) is retiring from politics.
2. Joker Arroyo (Lakas) is retiring from politics.
3. Panfilo Lacson (Independent) was appointed as Presidential Assistant for Rehabilitation and Recovery, with Cabinet rank, in December 2013. Lacson ran for senator in 2016 and won.
4. Francis Pangilinan (Liberal) was appointed Presidential Assistant for Food Security and Agricultural Modernization, with Cabinet rank, in May 2014. Pangilinan ran for senator in 2016 and won.
5. Manny Villar (Nacionalista) is retiring from politics.

Only one of the term-limited incumbents who were supposed to be appointed to the Cabinet were given government posts as of January 2014. Panfilo Lacson was appointed in December 2013 as the "rehabilitation czar" to coordinate reconstruction efforts after the devastation of Typhoon Haiyan (Yolanda). In May 2014, Francis Pangilinan was named Presidential Assistant for Food Security and Agricultural Modernization.

=== Other changes ===
1. Koko Pimentel (PDP–Laban) won an electoral protest against Juan Miguel Zubiri (Lakas) in the Senate Electoral Tribunal. Pimentel was seated on August 12, 2011.

== Candidates ==
After the period of registering for candidacy has lapsed, the Commission on Elections approved on October 12 the candidacies of 27 people without benefit of a hearing. Most of these come from the Ang Kapatiran, the Liberal Party-led coalition, and the United Nationalist Alliance. On October 26, the commission added five more nominees to the list, mostly from the Democratic Party of the Philippines and the Social Justice Society. Chairman Sixto Brillantes said that the list would not be added with any more names and that it would be final. However, Brillantes announced on December 4 that the candidacy of Israel Virgines of the Bangon Pilipinas Party has been accepted. He submitted his candidacy past the 5:00 p.m. deadline on October 5 due to traffic and was originally disallowed from running but was reconsidered by the commission as he had previously run in the previous Senate elections.

The lists below reflect UNA's removal of their three guest candidates from their slate effective February 21.

=== Administration coalition ===
Team PNoy ticket
| # | Name | Party |
|---|---|---|
| 2. | Sonny Angara | LDP |
| 3. | Bam Aquino | Liberal |
| 7. | Alan Peter Cayetano | Nacionalista |
| 13. | Francis Escudero | Independent |
| 18. | Risa Hontiveros | Akbayan |
| 19. | Loren Legarda | NPC |
| 22. | Jamby Madrigal | Liberal |
| 24. | Ramon Magsaysay Jr. | Liberal |
| 27. | Koko Pimentel | PDP–Laban |
| 28. | Grace Poe | Independent |
| 30. | Antonio Trillanes | Nacionalista |
| 32. | Cynthia Villar | Nacionalista |

=== Primary opposition coalition ===
United Nationalist Alliance ticket
| # | Name | Party |
|---|---|---|
| 5. | Nancy Binay | UNA |
| 8. | Tingting Cojuangco | UNA |
| 11. | JV Ejercito | UNA |
| 12. | Jack Enrile | NPC |
| 15. | Dick Gordon | UNA |
| 17. | Gregorio Honasan | UNA |
| 21. | Ernesto Maceda | UNA |
| 23. | Mitos Magsaysay | UNA |
| 33. | Juan Miguel Zubiri | UNA |

=== Independents ===
Independents
| # | Name | Party |
|---|---|---|
| 16. | Edward Hagedorn | Independent |
| 25. | Ramon Montaño | Independent |
| 26. | Ricardo Penson | Independent |

=== Single-candidate parties ===
Non-independents not in slates
| # | Name | Party |
|---|---|---|
| 1. | Samson Alcantara | Social Justice Society |
| 31. | Eddie Villanueva | Bangon Pilipinas |

=== Other tickets ===
Ang Kapatiran ticket
| # | Name | Party |
|---|---|---|
| 9. | Rizalito David | Ang Kapatiran |
| 10. | John Carlos de los Reyes | Ang Kapatiran |
| 20. | Marwil Llasos | Ang Kapatiran |

Democratic Party of the Philippines ticket
| # | Name | Party |
|---|---|---|
| 4. | Greco Belgica | DPP |
| 14. | Baldomero Falcone | DPP |
| 29. | Christian Señeres | DPP |

Makabayan ticket
| # | Name | Party |
|---|---|---|
| 6. | Teodoro Casiño | Makabayan |
| 13. | Francis Escudero* | Independent |
| 19. | Loren Legarda* | NPC |
| 27. | Koko Pimentel* | PDP–Laban |
| 28. | Grace Poe* | Independent |
| 32. | Cynthia Villar* | Nacionalista |

*Guest candidates

== Opinion polls ==
Opinion polling (locally known as "surveys") is carried out by two major polling firms: Social Weather Stations (SWS), and Pulse Asia, with a handful of minor polling firms. A typical poll asks a voter to name up to twelve persons one would vote for in the Senate election. Then, the results are presented with the candidates ranked in descending order of voting preferences. From these, one can find out which candidates may likely win, and which ticket would have the most winners.

The first figure denotes the number of candidates from the party or coalition that made it to the top 12 in each survey; the figures inside the parenthesis are other candidates that made it within the margin of error of the 12th placed candidate. The figure of the party or coalition (except independents) that outright wins a majority of seats contested (7, if 12 seats are contested) is italicized, while the party or coalition that outright wins a majority of seats in the Senate (13) is boldfaced. Guest candidates are counted as if they are regular candidates of their respective slates.

These are the polls administered after October 5, 2012, the deadline for the filing of certificates of candidacies. When UNA removed their three guest candidates on February 21, surveys that were conducted on or after that date would no longer include those three within UNA's statistics, while those before that date included them.

| Pollster | Date(s) administered | Sample size | Margin of error | Parties | | | | | | | | | Alliances | | | |
| Pollster | Date(s) administered | Sample size | Margin of error | Ak- bayan | LDP | LP | NP | NPC | PDP- Laban | UNA | Ind. | Others | Maka- bayan | Team PNoy | UNA | Others |
|---|---|---|---|---|---|---|---|---|---|---|---|---|---|---|---|---|
| StratPOLLS | Oct 8–17, 2012 | 300 | <3%, >4% | 0 | 1 | 1 | 2 (1) | 2 | 1 | 4 | 1 (1) | 0 | 4 | 7 (1) | 7 | 0 (1) |
| Pulse Asia | Nov 23–29. 2012 | 1,200 | ±3% | 0 | 1 | 0 | 3 | 2 | 1 | 4 | 1 | 0 | 4 | 7 | 7 | 0 |
| SWS | Nov 29 – December 3, 2012 | 1,200 | ±3% | 0 | 0 (1) | 0 | 3 | 2 | 1 | 5 | 1 | 0 | 4 | 6 (1) | 8 | 0 |
| The Center | Jan 9–17, 2013 | 1,200 | —N/a | 0 | 0 | 0 | 3 | 2 | 1 | 4 | 2 | 0 | 5 | 7 | 8 | 0 |
| SWS/BW | Jan 17–19, 2013 | 1,200 | ±3% | 0 | 0 | 0 | 3 | 2 | 1 | 4 | 2 | 0 | 5 | 7 | 8 | 0 |
| Pulse Asia | Jan 19–30, 2013 | 1,800 | ±2% | 0 | 1 | 0 | 3 | 2 | 1 | 4 | 1 | 0 | 4 | 7 | 7 | 0 |
| SWS/BW | Feb 15–17, 2013 | 1,200 | ±3% | 0 | 1 | 1 (1) | 3 | 1 (1) | 1 | 3 | 2 | 0 | 5 | 9 (1) | 6 (1) | 0 |
| Pulse Asia | Feb 24–28, 2013 | 1,800 | ±2% | 0 | 0 (1) | 1 | 3 | 2 | 1 | 3 (2) | 2 | 0 | 5 | 8 (1) | 4 (2) | 0 |
| StratPOLLS | Mar 8–13, 2013 | 1,200 | ±3.5% | 0 | 1 | 1 | 2 (1) | 2 | 1 | 3 (1) | 2 | 0 | 4 (1) | 8 (1) | 4 (1) | 0 |
| SWS | Mar 15–17, 2013 | 1,200 | ±3% | 0 | 1 | 1 (1) | 3 | 1 (1) | 1 | 3 | 2 | 0 | 5 | 9 (1) | 3 (1) | 0 |
| Pulse Asia | Mar 16–20, 2013 | 1,800 | ±2% | 0 | 1 | 1 | 3 | 1 (1) | 1 | 3 (2) | 2 | 0 | 5 | 9 | 3 (3) | 0 |
| SWS | Apr 13–15, 2013 | 1,800 | ±2% | 0 | 1 | 1 (1) | 3 | 2 | 1 | 3 (1) | 2 | 0 | 5 | 9 (1) | 4 (1) | 0 |
| Pulse Asia | Apr 20–22, 2013 | 1,800 | ±2% | 0 (1) | 1 | 1 (1) | 3 | 1 (1) | 1 | 3 (1) | 2 | 0 | 5 | 9 (2) | 3 (2) | 0 |
| SWS | May 2–3, 2013 | 2,400 | ±2% | 0 | 1 | 1 (1) | 3 | 1 (1) | 1 | 3 (1) | 2 | 0 | 6 | 9 (1) | 3 (2) | 0 |
| Pulse Asia | May 10–11, 2013 | 1,800 | ±2% | 0 | 1 | 1 (1) | 3 | 1 (1) | 1 | 3 | 2 | 0 | 5 | 9 (1) | 3 (1) | 0 |

== Campaign ==
While the candidates were legally allowed starting campaigning only on the 90th day before the election (February 12, 2013 for this election), the Supreme Court ruled in Lanot vs. COMELEC that the ban premature campaigning is unconstitutional as it infringes on a candidate's freedom of expression. This has led to some candidates to campaign even before the start of the campaign period.

=== Before the campaign period ===
Even before the start of the campaign period, candidates had begun releasing infomercials without explicitly stating that voters should vote for them; instead these were called "advocacy ads". The United Nationalist Alliance (UNA) is the first among the coalitions to air TV advertisements for their entire senatorial slate when ABS-CBN and GMA aired one of their advertisements on January 7, 2012. UNA's TV commercial featured minimal exposure to the candidates they share with the Liberal Party (LP)-led coalition, only showing them on the last frame. UNA also started having provincial sorties the next day, on January 8. President Aquino, in a provincial sortie in Mandaue, criticized UNA's early campaigning, saying that UNA "have to prove more than our own candidates." UNA secretary-general Toby Tiangco answered that the Liberals have been airing political ads and holding provincial sorties way before UNA did, pointing out that Aquino's criticism was done at the LP's own provincial sortie. Tiangco also said the UNA candidates were faring better against the LP's. On mid-January, LP officials started working on their coalition's TV advertisement, and were looking for ways to include Aquino in the ad.

On January 21, Secretary of Transportation of Communications Joseph Emilio Abaya said in a press conference at Malacañang Palace that Aquino himself reminded candidates from their coalition about campaign guidelines on appearing with UNA rallies. Abaya said a falling out with Aquino may be a bad enough penalty for candidates who will join UNA's rallies. Former president Joseph Estrada decried arrangement, saying that it is a virtual "ban" on common candidates. He further said that the ruling coalition is running scared, saying that "They know that the results of the 2013 elections would reflect their chances in 2016." Representative Ben Evardone has challenged the UNA to clarify if they are "fully supportive of President Aquino or has taken the role of the so-called united opposition that stands in the way of his daang matuwid (straight path) reform agenda". Tiangco left it to the three common candidates on joining UNA sorties despite the consequences that will be imposed by the LP.

The commission apologized to Teodoro Casiño when the final draft of the ballot listed him as an "independent" when he is nominated by Makabayan. Chairman Sixto Brillantes expressed regret as the commission may not have the time to edit the ballot before they are printed, and noted that the counting of his votes would not be affected. Casiño said that the error is unacceptable, and that there should not be mistakes in the practice of electoral rights.

The Liberal-led coalition renamed itself as "Team Pinoy", a play on words on "pinoy", an informal term used to denote the Filipino people (compare to "canuck"), and "PNoy", the administration's preferred reference to President Aquino, who has a "Noynoy" nickname. Angara said that "we decided to use ‘Pinoy’ to send the message that this campaign is for all Filipinos." The coalition released its first TV advertisement the next day, with the "Team PNoy" spelling. Unlike UNA's advertisement, Team PNoy's advertisement included the three common candidates.

Team PNoy expects the three common candidates to go to their campaign launch Manila's Plaza Miranda, the site of the Plaza Miranda bombing during the 1971 election, at the first day of the campaign period. Vice President Jejomar Binay personally picked Cebu City as the site of their campaign launch, to support suspended governor Gwendolyn Garcia. Loren Legarda had said that she will be not attending either rally, as she will celebrate the 80th birthday of her father with him.

=== Rest of February ===
| Campaign launches in Metro Manila | Campaign launches elsewhere in the Philippines |

Team PNoy held their proclamation at Plaza Miranda in Quiapo, Manila. President Aquino presented all of the coalition's candidates, including the three common candidates with UNA. Meanwhile, the UNA proclamation rally proceeded at Plaza Independencia in Cebu City despite light rains. Vice President Binay, Senate President Enrile and former president Estrada presented the nine candidates in Cebu, the province with the highest number of registered voters in the country.

Meanwhile, Bangon Pilipinas candidate Eddie Villanueva opened his campaign at Malolos, Bulacan, while independent candidate Edward Hagedorn started his campaign with a press conference surrounded by Miss Earth candidates to emphasize his pro-environment agenda, which followed with a motorcade that ended at the Santo Niño Parish Church at Tondo, Manila. Makabayan candidate Teodoro Casiño had a fun run that ended at the Senate building at Pasay to kick off his campaign. Samson Alcantara of the Social Justice Society opened his campaign outside his office at the corner of Taft Avenue and Padre Faura Street in Manila.

UNA threatened to drop Francis Escudero from their senatorial slate after he did not send a representative to UNA's proclamation rally, unlike fellow guest candidates Loren Legarda and Grace Poe. Escudero ignored the threat from UNA, maintaining that he would not be dictated by any party on the campaign, as he is running as an independent. The three were subsequently removed from the UNA senatorial line up on February 21, although President Estrada would still campaign for Poe in a personal capacity.

On February 19, the commission investigated the campaign of Jamby Madrigal after she was charged with illegal campaigning for holding an online raffle for an iPad. Madrigal admitted the charge but said that her volunteers, who were mostly from the youth sector, were the ones behind the raffle and that she had no prior knowledge regarding it.

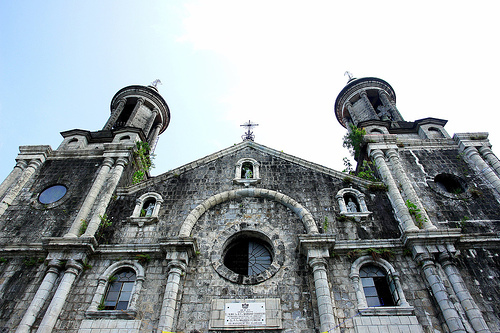
The San Sebastian Cathedral in Bacolod featured a tarpaulin that urged the voters which candidates to, and not to, vote.

The following day, when Team PNoy campaigned in Bacolod, the Roman Catholic Diocese of Bacolod placed a tarpaulin in front of the San Sebastian Cathedral that urged people not to vote for candidates who supported the passage of the Responsible Parenthood and Reproductive Health Act of 2012, who they labeled as "Team Patay" (Team Death): Risa Hontiveros, Loren Legarda, Sonny Angara, Alan Peter Cayetano and Chiz Escudero of Team PNoy, Jack Enrile of UNA and Teddy Casiño of Makabayan, while encouraging to vote for "Team Buhay" (Team Life): Cynthia Villar, Sonny Trillanes and Koko Pimentel of Team PNoy, and Gringo Honasan, JV Ejercito and Mitos Magsaysay of UNA. The commission ordered that the poster be taken down for being oversized. Bishop Vicente Navara said the diocese will just replace it with a poster that follows the commission's rules. The diocese cut the tarpaulin in half, but the commission would still press charges as it is still illegal.

More than two weeks after her aborted campaign raffle, Jamby Madrigal went to the commission's main office in Intramuros to explain her side on the alleged illegal campaign violation for the aborted iPad raffle. Madrigal personally apologized for the raffle and asked the commission to examine the social circumstances of similar raffles occurring on social medial websites; Chairman Brillantes answered that the campaign activities on social networks are covered by the Omnibus Election Code.

=== March ===
The erstwhile two-week standoff in Lahad Datu, Sabah between supporters of the Sultan of Sulu Jamalul Kiram III and the Malaysian authorities erupted in a gunfight that caused 14 deaths on March 1. President Aquino was in a campaign sortie with his ticket on San Fernando, Pampanga when the gunfight erupted, and he had to delay his appearance on the stage as he was monitoring the situation. In an interview at DZMM radio station, Secretary of the Interior and Local Government Mar Roxas reiterated the government's position that the Sulu Sultanate supporters to leave Sabah, noting that the followers of Kiram were "hard-headed".

Team PNoy candidates defended the government's actions, faulting that the Kirams for what has transpired, and said that they should have followed the president and have withdrawn from Sabah to prevent bloodshed. Ramon Magsaysay Jr. said that "If there is a firefight that is Mr. Kiram's problem. They should've withdrawn," while Koko Pimentel said that while it is the government's duty "is to protest the abuse of its nationals, But a leader [Aquino] should also be able to direct them to do something especially if it's for their own good." Campaign manager Franklin Drilon later stated that Team PNoy would take a common stand on the conflict, and will support the president.

The candidates of UNA, on the other hand, criticized the government's actions. In a political rally at Cagayan de Oro, Richard Gordon labeled the response as "severely woeful, anti-Filipino, and subservient to Malaysia." Campaign manager Toby Tiangco decried Roxas' "hard-headed" remarks as "arrogant." Gregorio Honasan said "they were being confronted with possible case, possible charges once they get back home. So, it's mixed signals. I'm sure that was not what the President meant."

Meanwhile, the Supreme Court issued a temporary restraining order to prevent the commission from enforcing its order in taking down the oversized poster in the Bacolod cathedral. In a surprise move, the Supreme Court stopped the implementation of the controversial Reproductive Health Law by issuing a status quo ante order for 120 days. The court will further determine the constitutionality of the law. The Catholic Church and several pro-life support groups praised the decision as a "temporary victory". Several members of the clergy have urged to backing of anti-RH legislators in the midterm polls.

=== April ===
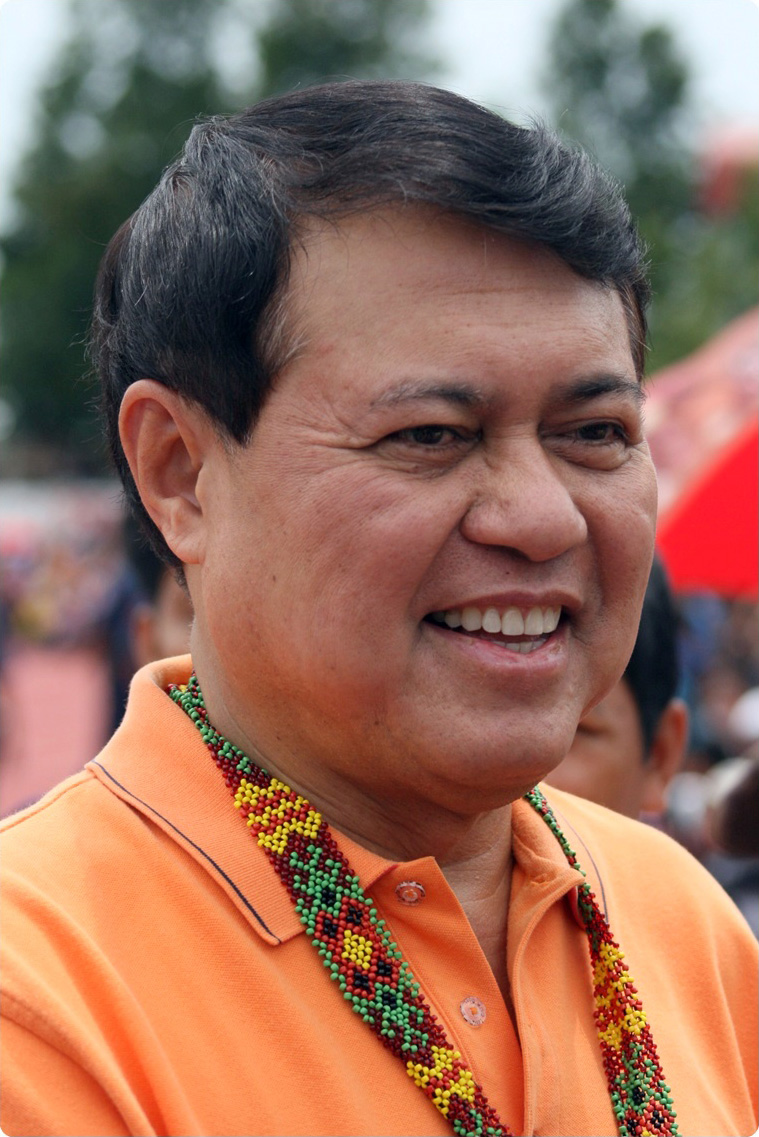
Senator Manny Villar and UNA senatorial candidate JV Ejercito (not pictured) had offshore accounts listed in the British Virgin Islands based on the report by the ICIJ and the PCIJ.

The International Consortium of Investigative Journalists (ICIJ) through its Philippine co-partnered media group, the Philippine Center for Investigative Journalism (PCIJ) released details of offshore accounts listed under Senator Manny Villar and UNA senatorial candidate JV Ejercito based in the British Virgin Islands, a known tax haven. Villar later stated, that he owned the BVI-listed, Awesome Dragon Holdings Limited which was incorporated in 2007. Villar, the husband of Team PNoy senatorial candidate Cynthia Villar further pointed out that, "a ready corporate vehicle for any strategic multinational business opportunity that may become available.” He denied however that the company was used as a business front to avoid paying proper taxation as that company had an authorized capital of $1 and he listed this in his annual Statement of Assets, Liabilities and Net worth (SALN). Ejercito, meanwhile slammed the ICIJ report linking him to a BVI-listed company, Ice Bell Properties Limited, incorporated in 1999. Ejercito question the release of the report but did not confirm or deny the said BVI-listed company. He stated in a written reply, "highly suspicious considering the ongoing electoral campaign of which I am one of the leading contenders among the UNA senatorial candidates. I have held high respect to (sic) the PCIJ as an institution. I hope that you will not allow yourself to fall in (sic) the manipulative efforts of desperate people in (sic) dirty politics.”

In the final weeks of the month, advocates and dissenters of the reproductive health law endorsed two sets of candidates for the Senate. The White Vote movement led by El Shaddai leader Mike Velarde and 40 Catholic lay organizations endorsed six UNA senatorial candidates Richard Gordon, Nancy Binay, Migz Zubiri, Gregorio Honasan, Mitos Magsaysay and JV Ejercito and three Team PNoy senatorial candidates, Aquilino Pimentel III, Antonio Trillanes IV and Cynthia Villar. The Purple Vote movement composed of advocates for the reproductive health law endorsed seven Team PNoy senatorial candidates: Sonny Angara, Bam Aquino, Alan Peter Cayetano, Chiz Escudero, Risa Hontiveros, Loren Legarda, and Grace Poe. Former Health Secretary and lead convener of the Purple Vote movement Esperanza Cabral stated that although the main basis of their endorsement was on the passage of the RH law, the endorsed candidates consistently support other progressive measures including the sin tax reform law and the freedom of information bill and are known for their integrity. Noticeable in the endorsement is the non-appearance of UNA senatorial candidate Jack Enrile and Makabayan senatorial candidate Teodoro Casiño both of whom were blacklisted under the Team Patay poster by the Bacolod cathedral.

Security during the electoral campaign was heightened on both sides after members of the communist rebels of the New People’s Army ambushed the convoy of Gingoog Mayor Ruthie Guingona, wife of former Vice President Teofisto Guingona, Jr., leaving the convoy driver and his brother dead. National condemnation of the ambush came from both sides of the political spectrum. Deputy Presidential Spokesperson Abigail Valte, Team PNoy campaign manager Franklin Drilon, and UNA campaign manager Toby Tiangco condemned the attack on Guingona.

=== May ===
Loren Legarda was accused by self-styled public interest advocate Louis Biraogo of allegedly failing to declare her possession of a condominium unit at Park Avenue, New York City for four years until 2011. In addition, Biraogo accused the senator of trying to hide her alleged properties at Forbes Park, Makati. Biraogo detailed that Legarda paid US$700,000 (or 36 million pesos in 2006 exchange rates) for the Park Avenue property, and that she did not include the property as real property assets in her statements of assets, liabilities and net worth (SALN) from 2006 to 2010. The next day, Legarda called a press conference to deny that she failed to declare the Park Avenue property, presenting a document signed by her lawyers saying that the property has been included in the SALN since 2007. Legarda added that she purchased the property while she was married to former Batangas governor Antonio Leviste. Legarda spent the greater part of press conference accusing of a certain "Willie F.", sending journalists "column feeds" related to the Park Avenue property. When pressed by journalists on who is Willie F.'s client, Legarda only hinted that the client was a male reelectionist senator, nicknamed "Boy Kuryente" (literally "bum steer") who was behind the rumors of President Aquino's mental health during the 2010 presidential campaign. President Aquino has spoken to Legarda and Francis Escudero, while Mar Roxas has spoken to Alan Peter Cayetano, allegedly the one behind the campaign against Legarda, to set aside their differences.

Several religious groups have released their endorsements in the Senate election. These religious groups command a voting bloc, and is crucial in close races. The Iglesia ni Cristo reportedly endorsed seven Team PNoy candidates and five from UNA, while the Kingdom of Jesus Christ endorsed six Team PNoy candidates, five from UNA and independent candidate Edward Hagedorn. The Iglesia ni Cristo reportedly commands five to eight million voters nationwide.

=== Campaign slogans ===
| Coalition | Primary slogan | English translation (if applicable) |
|---|---|---|
| Ang Kapatiran | None | |
| Bangon Pilipinas Party | Walang iwanan sa umaangat na bayan | No one will be left behind in a rising nation |
| Democratic Party of the Philippines | Digital People Power | |
| Makabayang Koalisyon ng Mamamayan | Pilipino para sa pagbabago, pagbabago para sa Pilipino | Filipinos for change, change for Filipinos |
| Social Justice Society | Alternatibo para sa Senado | Alternative to the Senate |
| Team PNoy | Mga tunay na tuwid, sa daang matuwid. | The truly righteous people in the righteous path. |
| United Nationalist Alliance | Sa UNA, gaganda ang buhay | With UNA, life will be better |
| Independent–Edward Hagedorn | Turismo, trabaho, mismo! | Tourism, jobs, right away! |
| Independent–Ramon Montaño | None | |
| Independent–Ricardo Penson | Krusada kontra dynasty | Crusade against [political] dynasties |

=== Campaign teams ===
| Coalition | Campaign manager | Spokesperson(s) |
|---|---|---|
| Team PNoy | Franklin Drilon | Miro Quimbo, Lorenzo Tañada III |
| United Nationalist Alliance | Toby Tiangco | JV Bautista |

== Issues ==
These are the candidates' positions on various issues:

| Issue | For | Against | No stand |
|---|---|---|---|
| Enactment of the Reproductive Health Law | Angara, Aquino, Cayetano, Escudero, Hontiveros, Legarda, Madrigal, Magsaysay, Poe, Enrile, Casiño, Villanueva, Hagedorn, Montaño, Penson | Pimentel, Trillanes, Villar, Binay,Cojuangco, Ejercito, Gordon, Honasan, Maceda, Magsaysay, Zubiri, Alcantara, Belgica, David, de los Reyes, Falcone, Llasos, Señeres | |
| Legalization of divorce | Hontiveros, Enrile, Gordon, Hagedorn, Penson | Angara, Aquino, Cayetano, Escudero, Legarda, Madrigal, Magsaysay, Trillanes, Villar, Binay,Cojuangco, Honasan, Maceda, Magsaysay, Zubiri, Alcantara, Belgica, David, de los Reyes, Falcone, Llasos, Señeres, Villanueva, Montaño | Pimentel, Poe, Ejercito, Casiño |
| Enactment of Universal health care | All candidates support the passage of a universal health care law in the Philippines. | | |
| Marijuana legalization | Ejercito | | |
| Enactment of a Freedom of Information law | All of the candidates support the passage of the Freedom of Information Bill and the non-inclusion of the Right of Reply provision in the bill except Jamby Madrigal (Team PNoy) who has no clear stand; the Senate had earlier passed the FOI bill unanimously on third reading. | | |
| Repeal of the Cybercrime Prevention Act of 2012 | Some candidates support the repeal of the Cybercrime Prevention Act of 2012. The bill was unanimously approved on third reading in the House of Representatives, and only Teofisto Guingona III (seat not up) dissented in the Senate vote on third reading. Voting records below reflect only the candidates running in this election: | | |
| Repeal of the Cybercrime Prevention Act of 2012 | Co-authors:Angara, Legarda; Voted in favor on third reading: Escudero, Legarda, Pimentel, Trillanes, Ejercito, Honasan, Casiño | | |
| Enactment of an anti-political dynasty law | Angara, Aquino, Hontiveros, Madrigal, Magsaysay, Pimentel, Enrile, Maceda, Zubiri, Alcantara, Belgica, Casiño, David, de los Reyes, Falcone, Llasos, Señeres, Villanueva, Montaño, Penson | Cayetano, Escudero, Villar, Binay,Cojuangco, Gordon, Honasan | Legarda, Poe, Trillanes, Ejercito, Magsaysay, Hagedorn |
| Abolition of pork barrel | Hontiveros, Belgica, Casiño, David, de los Reyes, Falcone, Llasos | | |
| Imposition of a flat tax | Belgica | | |
| Enactment of the Sin tax reform law^{a} | Angara, Aquino, Cayetano, Hontiveros, Legarda, Madrigal, Magsaysay, Pimentel, Poe, Trillanes, Villar, Binay,Cojuangco, Enrile, Gordon, Zubiri, Alcantara, David, de los Reyes, Falcone, Llasos, Villanueva, Hagedorn, Montaño, Penson | Escudero, Ejercito, Honasan, Maceda, Magsaysay, Belgica, Casiño, Señeres | |
| Reinstatement of the death penalty | Magsaysay, Cojuangco, Maceda, Falcone, David, de los Reyes, Llasos, Villanueva, Hagedorn | Angara, Aquino, Cayetano, Escudero, Hontiveros, Pimentel, Poe, Trillanes, Villar, Binay, Enrile, Gordon, Honasan, Magsaysay, Zubiri, Alcantara, Belgica, Casiño, Montaño, Penson | Legarda, Ejercito, Señeres |
| Instituting Same-sex marriage | Enrile | Aquino, Escudero, Madrigal, Magsaysay, Pimentel, Trillanes, Villar, Binay, Ejercito, Gordon, Maceda, Magsaysay, Zubiri, Alcantara, Belgica, David, de los Reyes, Falcone, Llasos, Señeres, Villanueva, Hagedorn, Montaño, Penson | Angara, Hontiveros, Legarda, Poe, Cojuangco, Honasan, Casiño |
| Implementation of a total gun ban | Hontiveros, Legarda, Magsaysay, Pimentel, Zubiri, David, de los Reyes, Llasos | Aquino, Escudero, Trillanes, Villar, Binay,Cojuangco, Enrile, Gordon, Honasan, Maceda, Magsaysay, Alcantara, Belgica, Casiño, Falcone, Señeres, Villanueva, Montaño, Penson | Angara, Madrigal, Poe, Ejercito, Hagedorn |
| Pursuing the claim over Sabah | All candidates support the pursuing of the claim over Sabah. | | |
| Arbitrating the claim of Scarborough Shoal with China at the International Court of Justice | All candidates support the arbitration proceedings over Scarborough Shoal at the International Court of Justice. | | |
| Charter change | Angara, Cayetano, Hontiveros, Magsaysay, Pimentel, Trillanes, Villar, Cojuangco, Ejercito, Enrile, Gordon, Honasan, Maceda, Magsaysay, Zubiri, Alcantara, Belgica, Falcone, Señeres, Villanueva, Hagedorn, Montaño, Penson | Aquino, Escudero, Legarda, Madrigal, Poe, Casiño, David, de los Reyes, Llasos | Binay |

^a Republic Act No. 10351 (commonly known as the Sin Tax Reform Law) was approved by President Benigno Aquino III on December 19, 2012.

== Results ==
Team PNoy won nine seats, while the United Nationalist Alliance (UNA) won three.

All six incumbents, namely Alan Peter Cayetano, Francis Escudero, Loren Legarda, Koko Pimentel, and Antonio Trillanes of Team PNoy, and Gregorio Honasan of UNA, won reelection.

Six neophytes won, namely Sonny Angara, Bam Aquino, Grace Poe, and Cynthia Villar of Team PNoy, and Nancy Binay and JV Ejercito of UNA.

Composition of the Senate before and after the election:

- Key: ‡ up; * vacancy

| | | 1 | 2 | 3 | 4 | 5 | 6 | 7 | 8 | 9 | 10 | 11 | 12 | 13 | 14 | 15 | 16 | 17 | 18 | 19 | 20 | 21 | 22 | 23 | 24 |
|---|---|---|---|---|---|---|---|---|---|---|---|---|---|---|---|---|---|---|---|---|---|---|---|---|---|
| Before election | Senate bloc | Majority bloc | | | | | | | | | | | | | | | | | | | | Minority bloc | | | |
| Before election | Party | | | | | | | | | | | | ‡ | ‡ | ‡ | ‡ | ‡ | ‡ | ‡ | ‡ | ‡^ | ‡ | ‡ | ‡ | |
| Election results | | Not up | | | | | | | | Team PNoy | | | | | | | | | UNA | | | Not up | | | |
| After election | Party | | | | | | | | | √ | √ | * | + | * | √ | √ | * | √ | √ | + | + | | | | |
| After election | Senate bloc | Majority bloc | | | | | | | | | | | | | | | | | Minority bloc | | | | | | |

Key:

- ‡ Seats up
- + Gained by a party from another party
- √ Held by the incumbent
- * Held by the same party with a new senator

=== Per candidate ===
A map showing the results by illustrating the topnotcher candidate by province.

| Candidate | Party or alliance | | Votes | % |
|---|---|---|---|---|
| Grace Poe | Team PNoy (Note: Guest candidate of Makabayan) | Independent | 20,337,327 | 50.66 |
| Loren Legarda | Team PNoy | Nationalist People's Coalition | 18,661,196 | 46.49 |
| Alan Peter Cayetano | Team PNoy | Nacionalista Party | 17,580,813 | 43.79 |
| Francis Escudero | Team PNoy | Independent | 17,502,358 | 43.60 |
| Nancy Binay | United Nationalist Alliance | | 16,812,148 | 41.88 |
| Sonny Angara | Team PNoy | Laban ng Demokratikong Pilipino | 16,005,564 | 39.87 |
| Bam Aquino | Team PNoy | Liberal Party | 15,534,465 | 38.70 |
| Koko Pimentel | Team PNoy | PDP–Laban | 14,725,114 | 36.68 |
| Antonio Trillanes | Team PNoy | Nacionalista Party | 14,127,722 | 35.19 |
| Cynthia Villar | Team PNoy | Nacionalista Party | 13,822,854 | 34.43 |
| JV Ejercito | United Nationalist Alliance | | 13,684,736 | 34.09 |
| Gregorio Honasan | United Nationalist Alliance | | 13,211,424 | 32.91 |
| Dick Gordon | United Nationalist Alliance | | 12,501,991 | 31.14 |
| Juan Miguel Zubiri | United Nationalist Alliance | | 11,821,134 | 29.45 |
| Jack Enrile | United Nationalist Alliance | Nationalist People's Coalition | 11,543,024 | 28.75 |
| Ramon Magsaysay Jr. | Team PNoy | Liberal Party | 11,356,739 | 28.29 |
| Risa Hontiveros | Team PNoy | Akbayan | 10,944,843 | 27.26 |
| Edward Hagedorn | Independent | | 8,412,840 | 20.96 |
| Eddie Villanueva | Bangon Pilipinas | | 6,932,985 | 17.27 |
| Jamby Madrigal | Team PNoy | Liberal Party | 6,787,744 | 16.91 |
| Mitos Magsaysay | United Nationalist Alliance | | 5,620,429 | 14.00 |
| Teodoro Casiño | Makabayan | | 4,295,151 | 10.70 |
| Ernesto Maceda | United Nationalist Alliance | | 3,453,121 | 8.60 |
| Tingting Cojuangco | United Nationalist Alliance | | 3,152,939 | 7.85 |
| Samson Alcantara | Social Justice Society | | 1,240,104 | 3.09 |
| John Carlos de los Reyes | Ang Kapatiran | | 1,238,280 | 3.08 |
| Greco Belgica | Democratic Party of the Philippines | | 1,128,924 | 2.81 |
| Ricardo Penson | Independent | | 1,040,293 | 2.59 |
| Ramon Montaño | Independent | | 1,040,131 | 2.59 |
| Rizalito David | Ang Kapatiran | | 1,035,971 | 2.58 |
| Christian Señeres | Democratic Party of the Philippines | | 706,198 | 1.76 |
| Marwil Llasos | Ang Kapatiran | | 701,390 | 1.75 |
| Baldomero Falcone | Democratic Party of the Philippines | | 665,845 | 1.66 |
| Total | | | 297,625,797 | 100.00 |
| Total votes | | | 40,144,207 | – |
| Registered voters/turnout | | | 52,982,173 | 75.77 |
Source: COMELEC

==== Unofficial tallies ====
Television networks, election watchdogs, and other bodies may provide their own tallies from their copies of election returns. These are unofficial.

These are from the tabulated election returns; in theory, the results here and the official one above, which is tabulated from the certificates of canvass, should be identical, once all of the votes are accounted for.

The results from the COMELEC's "Transparency" server and the tally done by the Parish Pastoral Council for Responsible Voting are currently identical.

| Candidate | Votes |
|---|---|
| Grace Poe | 16,329,336 |
| Loren Legarda | 14,932,854 |
| Francis Escudero | 14,127,959 |
| Alan Peter Cayetano | 14,120,660 |
| Nancy Binay | 13,301,921 |
| Sonny Angara | 12,844,983 |
| Bam Aquino | 12,368,028 |
| Koko Pimentel | 11,838,250 |
| Antonio Trillanes | 11,381,966 |
| Cynthia Villar | 11,062,891 |
| JV Ejercito | 11,002,943 |
| Gregorio Honasan | 10,613,735 |
| Richard J. Gordon | 10,153,960 |
| Migz Zubiri | 9,484,605 |
| Jack Enrile | 9,161,605 |
| Ramon Magsaysay, Jr. | 9,147,873 |
| Risa Hontiveros | 8,895,352 |
| Edward Hagedorn | 6,872,645 |
| Eddie Villanueva | 5,600,216 |
| Jamby Madrigal | 5,405,744 |
| Mitos Magsaysay | 4,481,351 |
| Teddy Casiño | 3,489,275 |
| Ernesto Maceda | 2,744,602 |
| Tingting Cojuangco | 2,404,008 |
| John Carlos de los Reyes | 988,165 |
| Samson Alcantara | 956,461 |
| Greco Belgica | 898,133 |
| Ricardo Penson | 824,561 |
| Rizalito David | 820,490 |
| Ramon Montaño | 776,926 |
| Marwil Llasos | 563,990 |
| Christian Señeres | 560,724 |
| Baldomero Falcone | 516,472 |
| Turnout | 31,552,304 |
| Total votes | 238,169,371 |
| Precincts reporting | 76.28 |

=== Per coalition ===
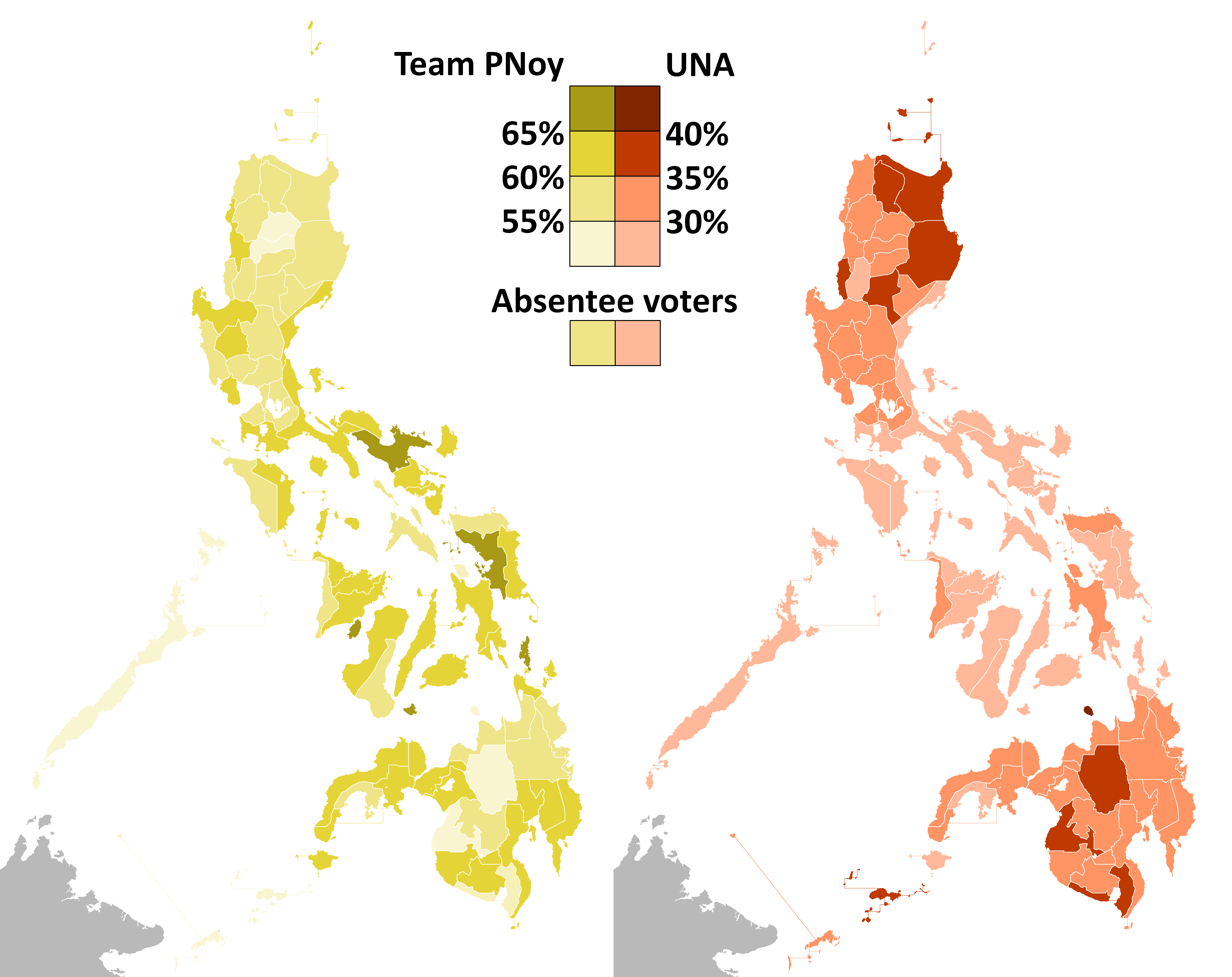
Cumulative vote totals of each coalition per province; Team PNoy had the majority of votes in every province except for Sulu. Candidates under the UNA banner had the plurality in a majority of provinces.

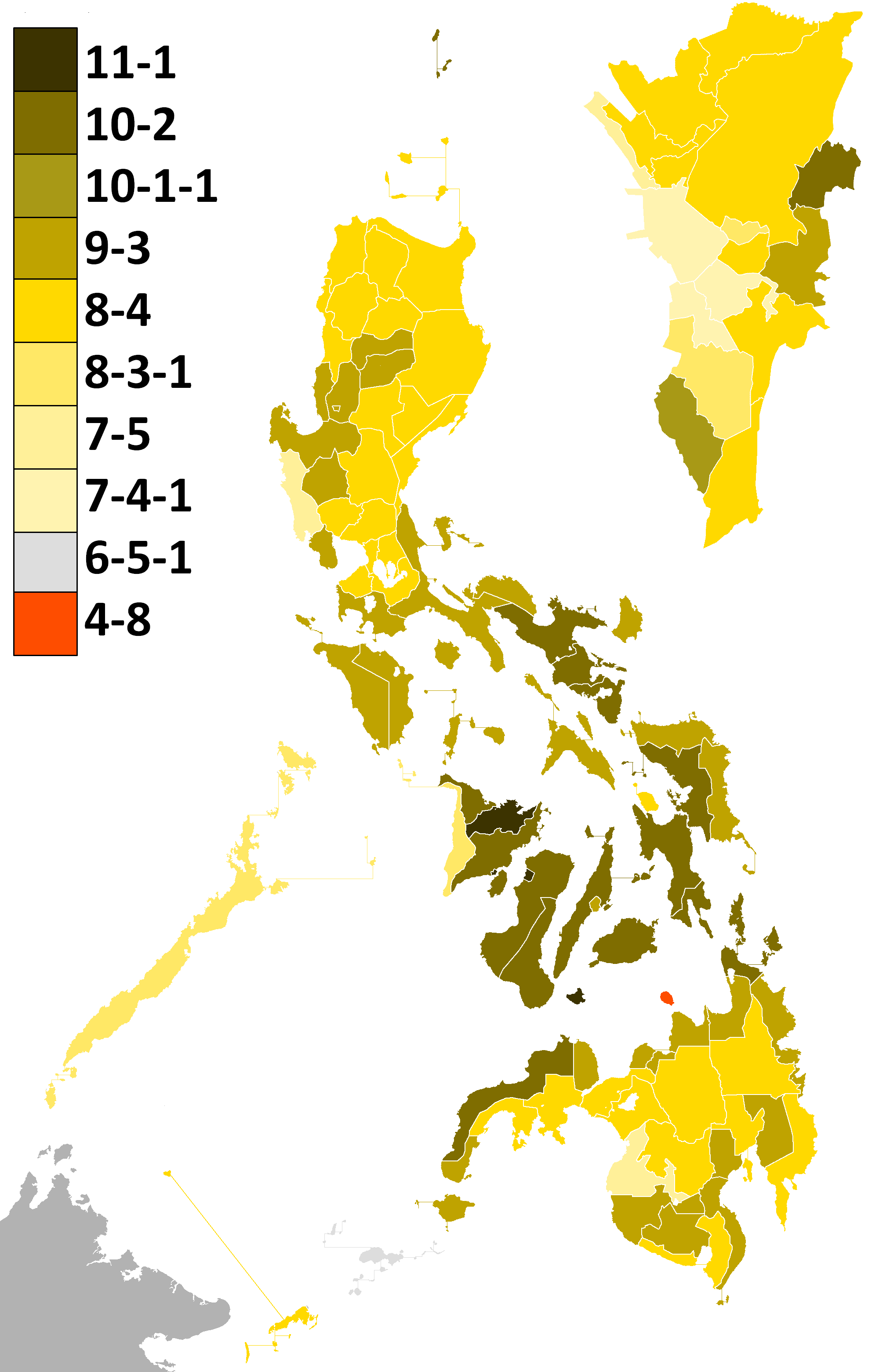
Full results of the election per coalition per province and independent city with a legislative district by its own right showing the composition of the top twelve candidates. The first number refers to the number of Team PNoy candidates that made it to the top 12, then by UNA candidates, then by other candidates. Note that winners are not determined by province or city but by the nationwide count.

| Party or alliance | | Votes | % | Seats |
|---|---|---|---|---|
| Team PNoy | Nacionalista Party | 45,531,389 | 15.30 | 3 |
| Team PNoy | Liberal Party | 33,678,948 | 11.32 | 1 |
| Team PNoy | Nationalist People's Coalition | 18,661,196 | 6.27 | 1 |
| Team PNoy | Laban ng Demokratikong Pilipino | 16,005,564 | 5.38 | 1 |
| Team PNoy | PDP–Laban | 14,725,114 | 4.95 | 1 |
| Team PNoy | Akbayan | 10,944,843 | 3.68 | 0 |
| Team PNoy | Independent | 37,839,685 | 12.71 | 2 |
| Team PNoy | Total | 177,386,739 | 59.60 | 9 |
| United Nationalist Alliance | United Nationalist Alliance | 80,257,922 | 26.97 | 3 |
| United Nationalist Alliance | Nationalist People's Coalition | 11,543,024 | 3.88 | 0 |
| United Nationalist Alliance | Total | 91,800,946 | 30.84 | 3 |
| Bangon Pilipinas | | 6,932,985 | 2.33 | 0 |
| Makabayan | | 4,295,151 | 1.44 | 0 |
| Ang Kapatiran | | 2,975,641 | 1.00 | 0 |
| Democratic Party of the Philippines | | 2,500,967 | 0.84 | 0 |
| Social Justice Society | | 1,240,104 | 0.42 | 0 |
| Independent | | 10,493,264 | 3.53 | 0 |
| Total | | 297,625,797 | 100.00 | 12 |
| Total votes | | 40,144,207 | – | |
| Registered voters/turnout | | 52,982,173 | 75.77 | |

Vote share
| Team PNoy | 59.60% |
| UNA | 30.84% |
| Others | 9.56% |

Senate seats
| Team PNoy | 75.00% |
| UNA | 25.00% |
| Others | 0.00% |

=== Per party ===
| Party | Votes | % | +/– | Seats | | | | |
| Party | Votes | % | +/– | Up | Before | Won | After | +/− |
|---|---|---|---|---|---|---|---|---|
| United Nationalist Alliance | 80,257,922 | 26.96 | New | 1 | 3 | 3 | 5 | +2 |
| Nacionalista Party | 45,531,389 | 15.30 | −1.39 | 3 | 5 | 3 | 5 | 0 |
| Liberal Party | 33,678,948 | 11.31 | −15.03 | 1 | 4 | 1 | 4 | 0 |
| Nationalist People's Coalition | 30,204,220 | 10.15 | New | 1 | 2 | 1 | 2 | 0 |
| Laban ng Demokratikong Pilipino | 16,005,564 | 5.38 | New | 1 | 1 | 1 | 1 | 0 |
| PDP–Laban | 14,725,114 | 4.95 | +2.72 | 1 | 1 | 1 | 1 | 0 |
| Akbayan | 10,994,843 | 3.69 | New | 0 | 0 | 0 | 0 | 0 |
| Bangon Pilipinas | 6,932,985 | 2.33 | +0.15 | 0 | 0 | 0 | 0 | 0 |
| Makabayan | 4,295,151 | 1.44 | New | 0 | 0 | 0 | 0 | 0 |
| Ang Kapatiran | 2,975,641 | 1.00 | +0.16 | 0 | 0 | 0 | 0 | 0 |
| Democratic Party of the Philippines | 2,500,967 | 0.84 | New | 0 | 0 | 0 | 0 | 0 |
| Social Justice Society | 1,240,104 | 0.42 | New | 0 | 0 | 0 | 0 | 0 |
| Independent | 48,332,949 | 16.24 | +8.16 | 2 | 3 | 2 | 3 | 0 |
| Lakas–CMD | | | | 1 | 3 | 0 | 2 | −1 |
| People's Reform Party | | | | 0 | 1 | 0 | 1 | 0 |
| Vacancy | | | | 1 | 1 | 0 | 0 | −1 |
| Total | 297,675,797 | 100.00 | – | 11 | 23 | 12 | 24 | +1 |
| Total votes | 40,144,207 | – | | | | | | |
| Registered voters/turnout | 52,982,173 | 75.77 | | | | | | |

Vote share
| UNA | 26.96% |
| NP | 15.30% |
| LP | 11.31% |
| NPC | 10.15% |
| LDP | 5.38% |
| PDP–Laban | 4.95% |
| Independent | 16.24% |
| Others | 9.71% |

Senate seats
| UNA | 25.00% |
| NP | 25.00% |
| LP | 8.33% |
| NPC | 8.33% |
| LDP | 8.33% |
| PDP–Laban | 8.33% |
| Independent | 16.67% |
| Others | 0.00% |

== Aftermath ==
The Commission on Elections allowed the media and other groups to use a server (the "Transparency" server) that would have tallied results directly from election returns; these were the first numbers that the media disseminated as the commission has yet to canvass results from the certificates of canvass, which came from the "MBOC" (Municipal Board of Canvassers) server, which is then transmitted to the provincial canvassers, than finally to the Commission on Elections en banc, which sits as the National Board of Canvassers (NBOC).

The commission en banc convened as the NBOC on Monday, May 13 at a tent at the Philippine International Convention Center grounds. After initializing the Consolidated Canvassing System (CCS) on election night (Monday), the NBOC adjourned for morning the next day. Chairman Sixto Brillantes said that the NBOC is expected to proclaim the 12 winning senators on Wednesday night.

However, on Wednesday morning, Brillantes said the intermittent telecommunication signals in several towns slowed down the pace of the collection of the results. He then said that the plan of proclaiming all 12 senators on Wednesday night would be adjusted to only six winners. On Wednesday afternoon, the commission canceled the proclamation of any winning senator, with Brillantes saying that "We are still analyzing what is happening on the field," adding that the proclamation would be held "most probably tomorrow."

On Thursday, Brillantes said that the commission en banc will decide on a motion by UNA deferring the proclamation; if the commission denies UNA's motion, a proclamation of "five to six" winners will proceed by Thursday night. That night, the commission en banc sitting as the NBOC rejected UNA's motion to defer the partial proclamation, leading the way for the proclamation of the first six candidates leading in their official tally: Grace Poe, Loren Legarda, Francis Escudero, Alan Peter Cayetano, Nancy Binay and Sonny Angara. Binay refused to appear at the proclamation after the UNA motion was rejected. The NBOC based their proclamation on the 22% of the certificates of canvass, or about 13 million votes.

The NBOC proclaimed three more senators on Friday evening, basing it on 109 out of 304 certificates of canvass: Bam Aquino, Koko Pimentel and Antonio Trillanes. Only Aquino was present at the proclamation. Trillanes was out of town, and Brilantes said that Pimentel was ill. Pimentel opposed the proclamation, calling it "premature" and "wrong"; Pimentel explained that the winning candidates should only be proclaimed if the votes not yet canvassed would no longer theoretically affect the results. Trillanes would have gone to the proclamation if he was not out of town, and while he said that he respected Pimentel's decision, he said that it was an argument "about formalities". Due to stringent criticism, Brillantes threatened to resign if the first six senators proclaimed would eventually lose.

The NBOC proclaimed the final three senators on Saturday night: Cynthia Villar, JV Ejercito and Gregorio Honasan, after only the overseas absentee ballots remained to be canvassed. Honasan's 705,000-vote lead against 13th-place Richard J. Gordon was deemed to be statistically impossible to be overtaken with only about 350,000 votes left to be counted.

On June 6, the commission released the final tally for the Senate election after the remaining uncounted votes can no longer affect the ranking of each candidate. Poe broke the record of Bong Revilla in 2010 for the most votes received in any election in the Philippines, by winning more than 20 million votes.

== Reactions ==
Grace Poe being finishing first in the unofficial counts ahead of longtime frontrunners Loren Legarda, Francis Escudero and Alan Peter Cayetano was seen as a surprise; Poe herself said that "I am surprised. I didn't know this would happen." Poe credited her mother Susan Roces, Escudero (former spokesman of Fernando Poe, Jr. during his 2004 presidential campaign), President Benigno Aquino III, Mar Roxas and former president Joseph Estrada. Pollsters such as Social Weather Stations (SWS) and Pulse Asia acknowledged that they did not foresee Poe's number one finish. Pulse Asia fellow Ana Maria Tabunda further stated that while they missed the order of the twelve winning candidates, they managed to predict all 12 who appeared to be winning; meanwhile, SWS president Mahar Mangahas said that "It was enough for us to have accurately predicted the 9-3 results even if we did not get their exact rankings."

Nancy Binay's victory, which came despite the enormous social media bashing such as the "Anyare?" (What happened) meme pointing out Binay being a neophyte against Risa Hontiveros' accomplishments while in the lower house, Binay's refusal to participate in debates, and a satirical article stating that Binay sought a "temporary protection order" from the courts to prevent her from engaging in a debate, according to Tony La Viña, dean of the Ateneo School of Government, may have been attributed to the voters seeing Binay as an "underdog" to Hontiveros, and might have backfired against Hontiveros and helped Binay. La Viña explained that Binay's victory was due to the fact that "she never took the bait on all the attacks against her," and that the Vice President just shrugged off the anti-Binay comments. Political analyst Malou Tiquia also noted that Hontiveros' campaign message was already used in the 2010 election where she finished 13th and lost, and that the campaign message softened her image to voters.

== Analysis ==
=== On Poe finishing first ===
Poe finishing first in the election was attributed by University of the Philippines Diliman (UP Diliman) assistant political science professor Nicole Curato to a very disciplined campaign via a clear association with her father Fernando Poe Jr. Curato added that while she was a Team PNoy candidate, some quarters in the United Nationalist Alliance openly supported Poe in the campaign, contributing to her victory.

Poe's #1 finish would catapult her to higher political ambitions in the 2016. UP Diliman political analyst Prospero de Vera expects Poe to be a candidate in the 2016 presidential or vice presidential election. If Poe joins the Liberal Party, de Vera said that President Aquino would expect a continuation of his "Daang Matuwid" (straight path) program, while noting out that he does not see a Mar Roxas-Poe tandem. De Vera instead sees a continued partnership of the Liberals with the Nacionalistas, with Poe and Alan Peter Cayetano as prospective running mates.

Her final total of more than 20 million votes gives her the largest mandate to any Filipino in history, beating the record previously held by Bong Revilla in the 2010 Senate election. Poe eventually ran in the 2016 presidential election, losing to Davao City Mayor Rodrigo Duterte, and finishing behind Roxas.

=== On who won the election ===
In his column in the Philippine Daily Inquirer, Amando Doronila noted that while the election can be seen as a victory for President Aquino, it should not be seen as a rejection of the opposition, as UNA managed to win three Senate seats, with the voters rebuffing Aquino's plea for a sweep of the election. Doronila added that if Poe and Legarda ran on the UNA ticket, they could've won as well, and that the Team PNoy victory was a "hollow victory" as the Liberal Party needed the help of the Nacionalista Party and the Nationalist People's Coalition, with the Liberals only controlling a small nucleus.

=== On bloc voting ===
Archbishop-emeritus Oscar V. Cruz, on the "Catholic vote" said that Catholics "were left still free to vote whom they wanted". This comes at the heels of seven out of twelve candidates endorsed by the White Vote movement by Mike Velarde were winning, five of the six "Team Buhay" ("team life") candidates winning, and four of seven "Team Patay" ("team death") candidates winning. Bishops Arturo Bastes, Honesto Ongtioco, Martin Jumaod, and Mario Peralta, blamed the lack of unity amongst Catholic voters on "money politics", such as vote-buying, while Cagayan de Oro archbishop Antonio Ledesma blamed the Commission on Elections such as faulty electoral rolls.

=== On the 60–30–10 ratio ===
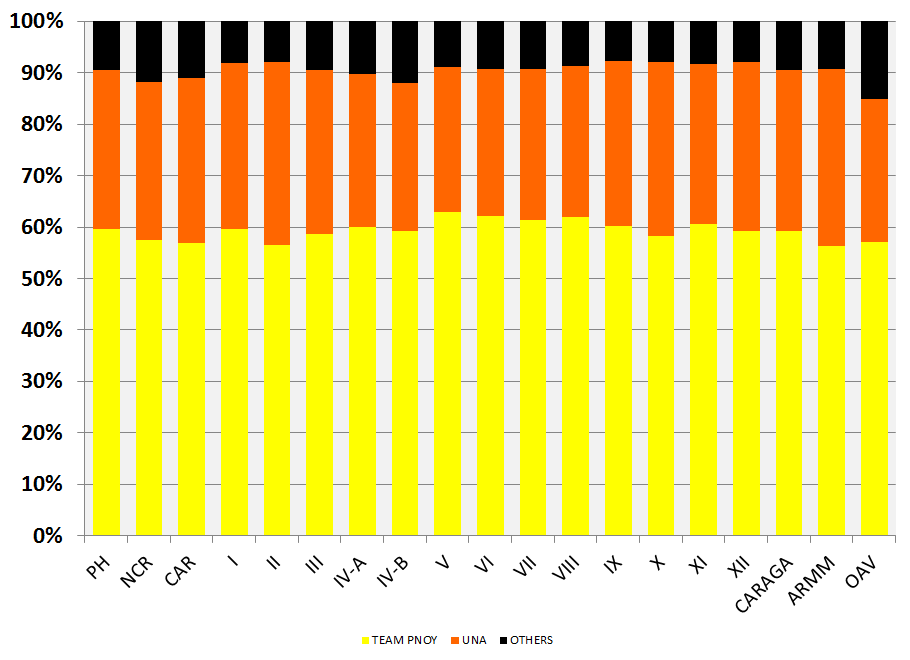
Ratios of the results per coalition in the election for every region and absentee voters.

After all 12 senators were proclaimed, Ateneo de Manila University mathematics professor Lex Muga pointed out that, in any given time, the National Canvass Report had 60% of the votes go to Team PNoy, 30% to UNA, and 10% to other parties. Muga said there should have been variation amongst certificates of canvass. UNA campaign manager Toby Tiangco said that the percentages could not be the same for every place in the Philippines; meanwhile, Team PNoy spokesperson Miro Quimbo said that it "is a result of a great message campaign led by the President himself and an aggressive ground war pursued by local parties allied with the President." Chairman Brillantes, for his part, while originally dismissing it as mere "trending", said that he would order the commission's information technology personnel on Muga's findings.

Michael Purugganan, Dean of Science in New York University explained that "Nothing fishy is going on. It is just poor math education," adding that "each canvass represents a very large sample from the total votes. And therefore each canvass would give a result that would be very, very close to the 60-30-10 national average." Purugganan cited the law of large numbers "which says that the larger your sample size is for an event, the closer your result from that sample will reflect the entire population." Purugganan pointed out that once a person goes down to precinct level, the vote totals will show more differences from the national total. The Rappler website has published a series of article refuting the 60–30–10 theory: one showed a regional tally, and tallies from Metro Manila and eight cities which showed the ratios start to deviate from the national average once specific places are tallied.

== Election for the Senate President ==
As early in April, Miriam Defensor Santiago said that the Senate President for the 16th Congress of the Philippines will come from Team PNoy, and that it will shall come from its oldest members; she tightened the contenders to Sergio Osmeña III, Franklin Drilon, TG Guingona and Cynthia Villar. Osmeña has said he is "has no interest" to the position, while Drilon has said that the presidency will be decided by the 24 senators. After all twelve senators-elect were proclaimed, Santiago narrowed down the contenders to between Drilon and Minority Floor Leader Alan Peter Cayetano. Meanwhile, Budget Secretary, Florencio Abad, a high-ranking Liberal Party official, said that they will not replace Enrile at the lame duck session from June 5 to 6.

However, the United Nationalist Alliance (UNA)-backed senators doubted if the component parties of Team PNoy can last up to the convening of Congress. Gregorio Honasan noted that in the opening of the 15th Congress, no administration candidate was agreed upon, and Enrile emerged as the compromise candidate. Meanwhile, a "senior official of the Liberal Party (LP)" told the Rappler news website that Drilon is almost sure to be the new Senate President, with the positions of Majority Floor Leader and committee chairmanships are the ones being negotiated. Furthermore, the LP source said that Drilon is expected "at least 12 votes", five "swing votes", six votes for Enrile, and that the voting would go from 13–11 to 18–6.

Later that week, Drilon, quoting Nacionalista Party President Manuel Villar, said that the Nacionalistas will stay in the coalition, and that the Nacionalistas and the Liberals will have a common candidate for the Senate presidency. Drilon also said that on the matter of committee assignments, senators will be given the committee of which they are an expert of, per usual Senate practice. Alan Peter Cayetano, for his part, said that "The coalition of the NP and the LP is growing. The support for Senator Drilon is growing." Cayetano also said that the two parties might have a common candidate in 2016 presidential election, "If two of the three biggest parties are working together."

In May 2013, Drilon pronounced that UNA "will not be obstructionist", and that Enrile gave permission to Drilon in seeking out to the members of the so-called "macho bloc", the senators who are identified to be close with Enrile. Senate president pro tempore Jinggoy Estrada confirmed the meeting of Drilon and Enrile, saying "I have already given my word to Senate President Enrile. If the Senate President will go down, I will go down with him." Estrada himself later met with Drilon, reiterating his support for Enrile, and that Enrile will be their candidate for Senate president, and with his imminent defeat, be the Minority Floor Leader. Estrada also predicted that the administration coalition will eventually disintegrate.

Upon the resumption of the one-day lame duck session on June 5, Enrile resigned from the Senate presidency "as a matter of personal honor and dignity". As per Senate rules, Senate president pro tempore Estrada succeeded Enrile as acting Senate president for the rest of the day without a new election. Later in the day, Estrada told the press that Enrile told him that he would like to be the minority leader in an impending Drilon Senate presidency. Estrada remarked that there are only six of them in the pro-Enrile bloc, and that Bong Revilla was considering joining Drilon's bloc in the 16th Congress. Also, Pia Cayetano was reportedly targeting the majority leadership, her brother Alan Peter the Senate president pro tempore post; Loren Legarda, who had previously served in both two positions, begged off, saying that she is "not interested".

On July 22, the day of convening of the 16th Congress, Juan Edgardo Angara and Grace Poe nominated Drilon for the Senate presidency, while JV Ejercito and Nancy Binay nominated Enrile. With Enrile and Drilon voting for each other, all other UNA members and Tito Sotto of the Nationalist People's Coalition voting for Enrile, others voting for Drilon, and Miriam Defensor Santiago being absent, this led to the election of Drilon as Senate president, with 17 senators voting for him, and six voting for Enrile, and 1 absence. Ralph Recto was elected Senate president pro tempore, Alan Peter Cayetano was elected majority floor leader, and Enrile became minority floor leader upon losing to Drilon.

| Candidate | # of Votes | Voter | Party |
|---|---|---|---|
| Franklin Drilon | 17 | Alan Peter Cayetano | Nacionalista (5) |
| Franklin Drilon | 17 | Pia Cayetano | Nacionalista (5) |
| Franklin Drilon | 17 | Bongbong Marcos | Nacionalista (5) |
| Franklin Drilon | 17 | Antonio Trillanes | Nacionalista (5) |
| Franklin Drilon | 17 | Cynthia Villar | Nacionalista (5) |
| Franklin Drilon | 17 | Bam Aquino | Liberal (3) |
| Franklin Drilon | 17 | TG Guingona | Liberal (3) |
| Franklin Drilon | 17 | Ralph Recto | Liberal (3) |
| Franklin Drilon | 17 | Lito Lapid | Lakas–CMD (2) |
| Franklin Drilon | 17 | Bong Revilla | Lakas–CMD (2) |
| Franklin Drilon | 17 | Sonny Angara | LDP (1) |
| Franklin Drilon | 17 | Loren Legarda | NPC (1) |
| Franklin Drilon | 17 | Koko Pimentel | PDP–Laban (1) |
| Franklin Drilon | 17 | Juan Ponce Enrile | UNA (1) |
| Franklin Drilon | 17 | Francis Escudero | Independent (3) |
| Franklin Drilon | 17 | Serge Osmeña | Independent (3) |
| Franklin Drilon | 17 | Grace Poe | Independent (3) |
| Juan Ponce Enrile | 6 | Nancy Binay | UNA (4) |
| Juan Ponce Enrile | 6 | JV Ejercito | UNA (4) |
| Juan Ponce Enrile | 6 | Jinggoy Estrada | UNA (4) |
| Juan Ponce Enrile | 6 | Gregorio Honasan | UNA (4) |
| Juan Ponce Enrile | 6 | Franklin Drilon | Liberal (1) |
| Juan Ponce Enrile | 6 | Tito Sotto | NPC (1) |
| Absent | 1 | Miriam Defensor Santiago | PRP (1) |

== Defeated incumbents ==
All incumbents who defended their seats won.

== See also ==
- 16th Congress of the Philippines
