= Opinion polling for the 2010 Philippine presidential election =

Opinion polling (popularly known as surveys in the Philippines) for the 2010 Philippine presidential election is managed by two major polling firms: Social Weather Stations and Pulse Asia, and several minor polling firms. The polling firms conducted surveys both prior and after the deadline for filing of certificates of candidacies on December 1, 2009.

== Post-filing ==
Note: Tables only include confirmed candidates by the COMELEC.

The following are results of surveys taken after the last day of filing of certificates of candidacies by the candidates (December 1).

Scores in bold indicate first place, scores in italics are within the margin of error of first place.

View source data.

=== Presidential election ===
Polling firm	Fieldwork date	Sample size	MoE	Acosta KBL	Aquino LP	De los Reyes AKP	Estrada PMP	Gordon B-BAYAN	Madrigal Ind.	Perlas Ind.	Teodoro LKS-KAM	Villanueva BPP	Villar NP	Others/Undecided
2010
Election results	May 9	36,139,102	N/A	—	42.08	0.12	26.25	1.39	0.13	0.15	11.33	3.12	15.42	N/A
SWS	Exit poll	52,573	±1%	—	**43.34**	0.15	26.38	1.40	0.23	0.13	10.25	3.40	14.73	—
SWS	May 2–3	2,400	±2%	0	**42**	0.3	20	2	0.2	0.1	9	3	19	6
StratPOLLS	Apr. 27–May 2	1,500	—	—	**45.2**	0.2	22.2	1.5	0.2	0.6	10.1	3	15.1	—
The Center	Apr. 26–May 2	2,400	±2.8%	—	**29**	—	18	—	—	—	20	—	25	—
Manila Standard Today	Apr. 25–27	2,500	±2%	—	**38**	0.1	22	2	0.4	0.2	9	3	20	6
Pulse Asia	Apr. 23–25	1,800	±2%	—	**39**	0.2	20	2	0.1	0.3	7	3	20	9
Manila Standard Today	Apr. 18–20	2,500	±2%	—	**38**	—	19	1	—	—	9	2	23	6
SWS	Apr. 16–19	2,400	±2%	0	**38**	0.2	17	2	0.3	0.2	9	2	26	6
Pulse Asia	Mar. 21–28	3,000	±2%	0.08	**37**	0.2	18	2	0.1	0.3	7	2	25	9
SWS	Mar. 19–22	2,100	±2.2%	—	**37**	0.3	19	3	0.04	0.1	6	2	28	4.56
The Center	Mar. 3–10	2,400	±2.8%	—	26	0.5	17	9	0	0	14	2	**28**	—
SWS	Feb. 24–28	2,100	±2.2%	0.4	**36**	0.1	15	2	0.1	0.2	6	3	34	4
Pulse Asia	Feb. 21–25	1,800	±2%	0.04	**36**	0	18	1	0.3	0.2	7	2	29	6
The Center	Feb. 1–8	1,800	±2.8%	—	**27**	—	17	8	—	—	14	3	**27**	—
TNS	Jan. 28–Feb. 3	3,000	±—%	—	**41.54**	—	11.66	1.7	0.22	—	5.21	2	30.63	—
Pulse Asia	Jan. 22–26	1,800	±2%	0.2	**37**	0.3	12	1	0.5	0.05	5	2	35	6
SWS	Jan. 21–24	2,100	±2%	0.3	**42**	0.2	13	2	0.4	0.04	4	2	35	2
StratPOLLS	Jan. 16–22	2,400	±2.2%	—	**36**	0.25	15	5	1	—	11	4	26	—
2009
SWS	Dec. 27–28	2,100	±2.2%	—	**44**	0.4	15	0.5	0.4	—	5	1	33	1
Pulse Asia	Dec. 8–10	1,800	±2%	—	**45**	—	19	1	—	—	5	1	23	5 (Note: 1% picked "others" while 4% picked none/refused/undecided.)
SWS	Dec. 5–10	2,100	±2.2%	—	**46.2**	0.1	16.0	1.1	0.2	0.03	4.6	1.1	27.0	3.7
The Center	Dec. 2–6	1,200	±2.8%	—	**31**	0.25	19	5	0.25	—	10	3	24	7.5

=== Vice presidential election ===
View source data.

Polling firm	Fieldwork date	Sample size	MoE	Binay PDP-Laban	Chipeco AK	Fernando V-VNP	Legarda NPC	Manzano LKS-KAM	Roxas LP	Sonza KBL	Yasay BPP	Others	Undecided
2010
Election results	May 9	35,165,531	N/A	41.65	0.15	2.89	12.21	2.30	39.58	0.18	1.04	N/A	
SWS	Exit poll	52,573	±1%	**42.52**	0.43	2.92	11.51	1.81	39.17	0.20	1.43	—	
SWS	May 2–3	2,400	±2%	**37.2**	0.2	4	12	3	37	0.3	1	6	
StratPOLLS	Apr. 27–May 2	1,500	—	37.8	0.2	2.7	13.1	3.5	**40.1**	0.2	1.2	—	
The Center	Apr. 26–May 2	2,400	±2.8%	25.0	—	—	29.0	—	**34.0**	—	—	—	
Manila Standard Today	Apr. 25–27	2,500	±2%	28	—	2	20	3	**38**	—	—	9	
Pulse Asia	Apr. 23–25	1,800	±2%	28	0.05	3	20	3	**37**	0.03	1	9	
Manila Standard Today	Apr. 18–20	2,500	±2%	22	—	3	23	2	**41**	—	—	9	
SWS	Apr. 16–19	2,400	±2%	25	0.3	3	24	2	**39**	0.4	1	5	
Pulse Asia	Mar. 21–28	3,000	±2%	19	0.1	3	23	2	**43**	0.5	1	9	
SWS	Mar. 19–22	2,100	±2.2%	21	0.4	3	25	3	**42**	0.3	1	5	
SWS	Feb. 24–28	2,100	±2.2%	17	0.4	3	28	2	**45**	1	0.4	—	3
Pulse Asia	Feb. 21–25	1,800	±2%	15	0.1	4	27	2	**43**	1	1	7	
Pulse Asia	Jan. 22–26	1,800	±2%	13	0.07	2	28	2	**47**	0.2	1	7	
SWS	Jan. 21–24	2,100	±2%	16	0.2	2	28	2	**49**	0.3	0.4	2	
StratPOLLS	Jan. 16–22	2,400	±2.2%	11	2	7	25	5	**47**	1	1	—	
2009
SWS	Dec. 27–28	2,100	±2.2%	14.0	0.04	3.0	31.0	2.0	**47.0**	0.3	0.2	2.4	
Pulse Asia	Dec. 8–10	1,800	±2%	14	—	2	37	2	**39**	—	—	1	4
SWS	Dec. 5–10	2,100	±2.2%	10.2	0.0	1.8	32.0	2.6	**43.3**	0.3	0.1	9.7	
The Center	Dec. 2–6	1,200	±2.8%	16.0	—	8.0	28.0	3.0	**32.0**	0.25	0.37	—	—

=== Pre-filing ===
The following are survey results before the deadline of filing of certificates of candidacy.

Note: Figures assigned with "–" refers that the person either wasn't included among the choices or failed to crack the top positions in the poll.

==== Pulse Asia ====
Pulse Asia: Of the people on this list, whom would you vote for as President of the Philippines if the elections were held today and they were presidential candidates?

Polling firm	Fieldwork date	Sample size	MoE	De Castro Ind.	Jo. Estrada PMP	Legarda NPC	Escudero Ind.	Roxas LP	Lacson UNO	Villar NP	Fernando V-VNP	Binay PDP-Laban	Villanueva BPP	Gordon V-VNP	Teodoro Lakas-K-C	Puno Lakas-K-C	Others	No answer / refused to answer / undecided
Pulse Asia	May 4–17, 2009	1,200	±3%	**18**	15	7	17	13	4	14	0.3	4	0.4	1	1	1	2.5% Pangilinan (Ind): 1% Velarde (Ind): 0.3% Panlilio (Lib): 0.2% Others: 1%	4
Pulse Asia	Oct 14–27, 2008	1,200	±3%	**18**	17	13	15	6	7	17	1	1	1	–	–	–	–	–
Pulse Asia	July 1–14, 2008	1,200	±3%	**22**	16	14	14	8	5	12	1	2	–	–	–	0.2	–	–
Pulse Asia	Feb 2–Mar 8, 2008	1,200	±3%	**21.5**	–	17.5	13	10.5	9.9	9.3	1.4	1.2	–	0.7	0.3	–	7.2% Ji. Estrada (PMP): 3.3% Trillanes (UNO): 3% Esperon (Ind): 0.4% Belmonte (Lib): 0.3% Ermita (Lakas-K-C): 0.1% Meloto (Ind): 0.1%	6.8

Notes:

- Sample: 1,200, with 300 each for Metro Manila, rest of Luzon, Visayas and Mindanao.
- Margin of error: ±3% for national percentages and ±6% for area percentages

==== Social Weather Stations ====
Social Weather Stations: Under the present Constitution, the term of Pres. Arroyo is only up to the year 2010, and there will be an election for President in May 2010. Who in your opinion are the good leaders who should succeed President Arroyo as President?

Person	Sep '07	Dec '07	Mar '08	Jun '08	Nov '08	Dec '08	Mar '09	Jun '09	Sep '09
Aquino, Benigno III	--	--	--	--	--	--	--	--	60%
Cayetano, Alan Peter	1%	3%	--	--	--	--	--	--	--
Binay, Jejomar	--	--	--	--	--	--	1%	4%	12%
De Castro, Noli	25%	30%	35%	31%	29%	31%	27%	19%	8%
Estrada, Joseph	5%	9%	14%	11%	13%	11%	13%	25%	18%
Escudero, Francis	13%	15%	19%	14%	16%	19%	23%	20%	15%
Estrada, Jinggoy	1%	2%	--	--	1%	--	1%	--	--
Fernando, Bayani	5%	9%	14%	11%	13%	11%	13%	--	1%
Gordon, Richard	--	--	--	--	--	--	1%	4%	9%
Lacson, Panfilo	18%	13%	12%	16%	17%	14%	14%	7%	2%
Legarda, Loren	44%	23%	30%	26%	26%	28%	25%	15%	5%
Pangilinan, Francis	3%	2%	2%	2%	1%	1%	1%	--	--
Ramon Revilla	--	--	--	--	--	--	1%	--	--
Roxas, Mar	9%	20%	16%	13%	13%	10%	15%	20%	12%
Santiago, Miriam	3%	4%	--	--	1%	1%	4%	13%	17%
Trillanes, Antonio IV	4%	3%	--	--	1%	1%	--	--	--
Villar, Manny	18%	27%	17%	25%	28%	27%	26%	33%	37%
Don't know	12%	12%	11%	15%	9%	7%	13%	7%	6%
Not sure/None	6%	5%	5%	8%	9%	12%	7%	18%	4%

Notes:

- Participants were allowed to choose up to three persons, hence the numbers would exceed 100%.
- Responses below 2% were excluded.
- Sample: 1,200, with 300 each for Metro Manila, rest of Luzon, Visayas and Mindanao.
- Margin of error: ±3% for national percentages and ±6% for area percentages

== Controversy ==
With the various surveys showing a two-horse race between Noynoy Aquino and Manny Villar, other candidates had expressed doubts on the accuracy of the surveys. Presidential candidate Richard Gordon filed a temporary restraining order before the Quezon City Regional Trial Court, to stop Pulse Asia and SWS from releasing results of pre-election surveys. Gordon said that the research groups used false methodologies and that the 2 survey companies are "stealing the people's minds" and preventing voters from carefully choosing their preferred candidates, particularly those running for president."
