= Opinion polling for the 2010 Philippine Senate election =

== Post-filing ==
Note: Tables only include confirmed candidates by the COMELEC.

The following are results of surveys taken after candidates were confirmed by the COMELEC.

| Poll source | Date(s) administered | Sample size | Margin of error | Candidates | | | | | | | | | | | |
|---|---|---|---|---|---|---|---|---|---|---|---|---|---|---|---|
| SWS | May 2–3, 2010 | 2,400 | ±2% | Revilla; 51% | Estrada; 50% | Defensor; Santiago; 45% | Drilon; 39% | Enrile; 36% | Cayetano; 34% | Marcos; 31% | Sotto; 30% | Recto; 29% | Osmeña; 29% | Lapid; 26% | Guingona; 22% |
| Pulse Asia | Apr. 23–25, 2010 | 1,800 | ±2% | Revilla; 52.8% | Estrada; 50% | Defensor; Santiago; 47.9% | Enrile; 40.6% | Drilon; 38.4% | Cayetano; 38.1% | Sotto; 32.3% | Osmeña; 32.2% | Recto; 30.1% | Marcos; 27.7% | Guingona; 23% | Lapid; 21% |
| SWS | Apr. 16–19, 2010 | 2,100 | ±2% | Revilla; 54% | Estrada; 53% | Defensor; Santiago; 44% | Enrile; 36% | Cayetano; 36% | Drilon; 36% | Sotto; 35% | Recto; 30% | Osmeña; 29% | Marcos; 28% | Lapid; 27% | Remulla; 21% |
| SWS | Mar. 19–22, 2010 | 2,100 | ±2% | Revilla; 53% | Estrada; 52% | Defensor; Santiago; 44% | Cayetano; 42% | Drilon; 36% | Enrile; 35% | Sotto; 33% | Recto; 30% | Marcos; 30% | Lapid; 29% | Osmeña; 26% | Remulla; 25% |
| The Center | Feb. 24–28, 2010 | 2,400 | ±2% | Revilla; 49% | Defensor; Santiago; 47% | Estrada; 45% | Cayetano; 44% | Recto; 44% | Sotto; 39% | Marcos; 39% | Lapid; 35% | Enrile; 35% | Drilon; 33% | Osmeña; 31% | Guingona; 28% |
| SWS | Feb. 24–28, 2010 | 2,100 | ±2% | Revilla; 54% | Cayetano; 51% | Estrada; 47% | Defensor; Santiago; 46% | Drilon; 45% | Recto; 41% | Enrile; 40% | Sotto; 39% | Marcos; 32% | Lapid; 31% | Osmeña; 31% | Pimentel; 27% |
| Pulse Asia | Feb. 21–25, 2010 | 1,800 | ±2% | Revilla; 53.6% | Estrada; 52.6% | Defensor; Santiago; 49.4% | Cayetano; 45.4% | Drilon; 45% | Enrile; 43.8% | Sotto; 33.2% | Recto; 33.1% | Osmeña; 29.1% | Marcos; 28.2% | Lapid; 25.8% | Guingona; 24.3% |
| Pulse Asia | Jan. 22–26, 2010 | 1,800 | ±2% | Revilla; 51.9% | Estrada; 50.4% | Cayetano; 46.8% | Drilon; 43.2% | Defensor; Santiago; 41.2% | Enrile; 39.7% | Recto; 34.4% | Osmeña; 31.6% | Sotto; 30.5% | Lapid; 29.7% | Marcos; 26.3% | de Venecia; 24.0% |
| SWS | Jan. 21–24, 2010 | 2,100 | ±2% | Revilla; 58.0% | Cayetano; 57.0% | Estrada; 57.0% | Defensor; Santiago; 50.0% | Drilon; 47.0% | Enrile; 42.0% | Sotto; 41.0% | Recto; 40.0% | Marcos; 39.0% | Osmeña; 38.0% | Guingona; 31.0% | de Venecia; 30.0% |
| Pulse Asia | Dec. 8–10, 2009 | 1,800 | ±2.0% | Estrada; 55.1% | Revilla; 52.7% | Defensor; Santiago; 51.4% | Drilon; 48.4% | Cayetano; 43.1% | Recto; 43.1% | Enrile; 42.7% | Osmeña; 40.2% | Sotto; 40.2% | Marcos; 31.0% | Guingona; 28.5% | de Venecia; 24.3% |
| SWS | Dec. 5–10, 2009 | 2,100 | ±2.2% | Defensor; Santiago; 55.0% | Revilla; 54.0% | Estrada; 53.0% | Cayetano; 48.0% | Drilon; 47.0% | Recto; 44.0% | Sotto; 40.0% | Enrile; 37.0% | Marcos; 32.0% | Osmeña; 31.0% | Guingona; 24.0% | Lapid; 23.0% |

== Graph ==
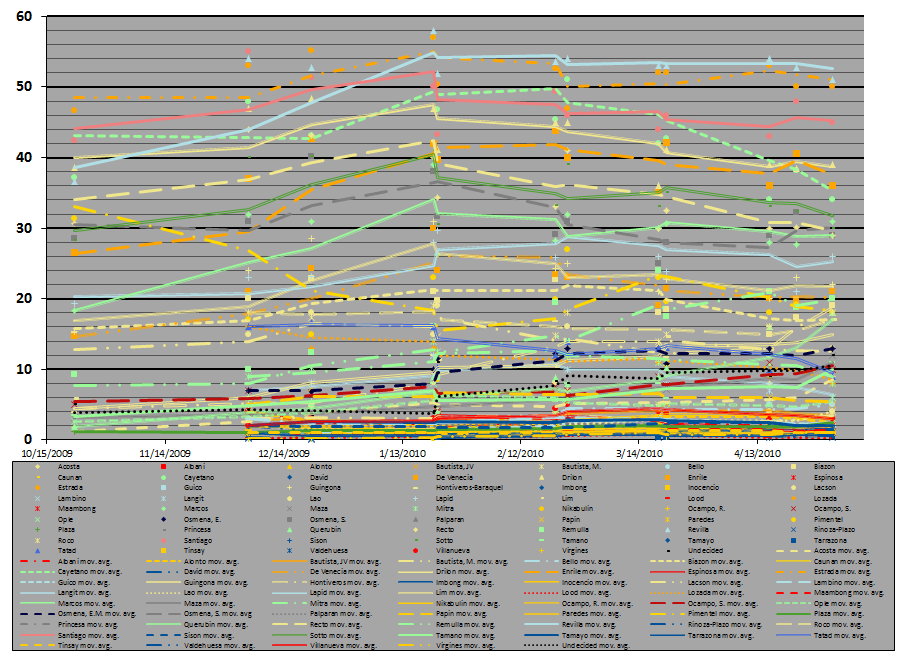
Graph for the w:Opinion polling in the Philippine Senate election, 2010. Each candidate's opinion poll (survey) is denoted by a plot point. This is one "period." The lines are moving averages of the last three periods.

The result of each candidate's opinion poll (survey) result is denoted by a plot point, or a "period" (per.). The lines denote moving averages (mov. avg.) of the last three polls (each poll given equal weight) for each candidate; as pollsters may use different methodologies, it is invalid to plot each period from all pollsters as if it is a single series. Hence, a moving average is used to link all polls from all pollsters into one series. Some candidates may not appear on some polls, and these do not include candidates who are not on the final list but were included in other polls. The twelfth ranking candidate in each poll is denoted by a line, for easy reference.
