= Opinion polling on the Rodrigo Duterte presidency =

Opinion polling on the 16th president of the Philippines

Opinion polling, known as surveys in the Philippines, on the presidency of Rodrigo Duterte has been conducted by various pollsters from 2016 to 2022. Duterte retained his popularity throughout his term, and became the Philippines' most trusted official immediately after assuming office. Social Weather Stations (SWS) reported that Duterte had his lowest approval rating in mid-2018. Pollsters and analysts noted Duterte's popularity was a rarity among Philippine presidents during their lame duck period given the public's propensity for getting bored with the current leadership as they excitedly look toward a new name to shade on the ballots for the next presidential election. By the end of his term, Duterte received his highest SWS approval rating and effectively became the Philippines' most popular post-EDSA president to date in spite of the controversies surrounding his administration.

== Approval and performance ratings ==
Fieldwork date	Segment polled	Polling group	Approve	Disapprove	Undecided/ Neither	Net satisfaction (SWS)	Sample size	Margin of error	Polling method	Question wording	Source(s)
September 24–27, 2016		SWS	76	11	13	+64 ("Very good")	1,200		face-to-face interview		
September 25–October 1, 2016	adults (18 years old and above)	Pulse Asia	86	3	11		1,200	±3.0%	face-to-face interview		
December 3–6, 2016	adults (18 years old and above)	SWS	77	13	10	+63 ("Very good")	1,500	±3.0%	face-to-face interview	(Note: "Maaari po bang pakisabi ninyo kung gaano kayo nasisiyahan o hindi nasisiyahan sa pagganap ng tungkulin ni RODRIGO DUTERTE bilang Presidente ng Pilipinas. Kayo ba ay lubos na nasisiyahan, medyo nasisiyahan, hindi tiyak kung nasisiyahan o hindi, medyo hindi nasisiyahan, lubos na hindi nasisiyahan, o wala pa kayong narinig o nabasa kahit na kailan tungkol kay RODRIGO DUTERTE?" [transl. "Please tell me how satisfied or dissatisfied you are in the performance of RODRIGO DUTERTE as President of the Philippines. Are you very satisfied, somewhat satisfied, undecided if satisfied or dissatisfied, somewhat dissatisfied, very dissatisfied, or you have not ever heard or read anything about RODRIGO DUTERTE?"])	
March 15–20, 2017	adults (18 years old and above)	Pulse Asia	78	7	15		1,200	±3.0%	face-to-face interview		
March 25–28, 2017	adults (18 years old and above)	SWS	75	12	12	+63 ("Very good")	1,200	±3.0%	face-to-face interview		
June 23–26, 2017	adults (18 years old and above)	SWS	78	12	10	+66 ("Very good")	1,200	±3.0%	face-to-face interview		
June 24–29, 2017	adults (18 years old and above)	Pulse Asia	82	5	13		1,200	±3.0%	face-to-face interview		
September 23–27, 2017	adults (18 years old and above)	SWS	67	19	14	+48 ("Good")	1,500	±2.5%	face-to-face interview		
September 24–30, 2017	adults (18 years old and above)	Pulse Asia	80	7	13		1,200	±3.0%	face-to-face interview		
December 8–16, 2017	adults (18 years old and above)	SWS	71	13	15	+58 ("Very good")	1,200	±3.0%	face-to-face interview		
December 10–15, 17, 2017	adults (18 years old and above)	Pulse Asia	80	7	13		1,200	±3.0%	face-to-face interview		
March 23–27, 2018	adults (18 years old and above)	SWS	70	14	17	+56 ("Very good")	1,200	±3.0%	face-to-face interview		
June 15–21, 2018	registered voters (18 years old and above)	Pulse Asia	88	3	10		1,800	±2.0%	face-to-face interview		
June 27–30, 2018	adults (18 years old and above)	SWS	65	20	15	+45 ("Good")	1,200	±3.0%	face-to-face interview		
September 1–7, 2018	adults (18 years old and above)	Pulse Asia	75	10	15		1,800	±2.3%	face-to-face interview		
September 15–23, 2018	adults (18 years old and above)	SWS	70	16	14	+54 ("Very good")	1,500	±3.0%	face-to-face interview		
December 14–21, 2018	adults (18 years old and above)	Pulse Asia	81	7	13		1,800	±2.3%	face-to-face interview		
December 16–19, 2018	adults (18 years old and above)	SWS	74	15	11	+60 ("Very good")	1,440	±2.6%	face-to-face interview		
March 28–31, 2019	adults (18 years old and above)	SWS	79	13	8	+66 ("Very good")	1,440	±2.6%	face-to-face interview		
June 22–26, 2019	adults (18 years old and above)	SWS	80	12	9	+68 ("Very good")	1,200	±3.0%	face-to-face interview		
June 24–30, 2019	adults (18 years old and above)	Pulse Asia	85	3	11		1,200	±2.8%	face-to-face interview		
September 16–22, 2019	adults (18 years old and above)	Pulse Asia	78	8	14		1,200	±2.8%	face-to-face interview		
September 27–30, 2019	adults (18 years old and above)	SWS	78	13	9	+65 ("Very good")	1,800	±2.3%	face-to-face interview		
December 2019		Pulse Asia	87								
December 13–16, 2019	adults (18 years old and above)	SWS	82	10	8	+72 ("Excellent")	1,200	±3.0%	face-to-face interview		
August 1–11, 2020	registered voters (18 years old and above)	PUBLiCUS Asia	65	21			1,500		online survey questionnaire		
September 14–20, 2020	adults (18 years old and above)	Pulse Asia	91	5	5		1,200	±2.8%	face-to-face interview		
November 21–25, 2020	adults (18 years old and above)	SWS	84	6	9	+79 ("Excellent")	1,500	±3.0%	face-to-face interview		
December 3–9, 2020	registered voters	PUBLiCUS Asia	70	16	13		1,500				
March 20–29, 2021	registered voters	PUBLiCUS Asia	65	19	15		1,500				
April 28–May 2, 2021	adults (18 years old and above)	SWS	75	10	15	+65 ("Very good")	1,200	±3.0%	face-to-face interview		
June 23–26, 2021	adults (18 years old and above)	SWS	75	13	12	+62 ("Very good")	1,200	±3.0%	face-to-face interview		
July 13–19, 2021	registered voters	PUBLiCUS Asia	58	23	19		1,500				
September 12–16, 2021	adults (18 years old and above)	SWS	67	15	11	+52 ("Very good")	1,200	±3.0%	face-to-face interview		
October 11–18, 2021		PUBLiCUS Asia	60	21	17		1,500				
December 1–6, 2021	adults (18 years old and above)	Pulse Asia	72	11	17		2,400	±2.0%	face-to-face interview		
December 6–10, 2021		PUBLiCUS Asia	65				1,500				
December 12–16, 2021	adults (18 years old and above)	SWS	75	15	9	+60 ("Very good")	1,440	±2.6%	face-to-face interview		
March 30–April 6, 2022	registered voters	PUBLiCUS Asia	67	15			1,500	±3.0%			
March 5–10, 2022		OCTA Research	67								
April 19–27, 2022	adults (18 years old and above)	SWS	78	13	9	+65 ("Very good")	1,440	±2.6%	face-to-face interview		
June 16–22, 2022		PUBLiCUS Asia	75	10			1,500				
June 26–29, 2022	adults (18 years old and above)	SWS	88	7	5	+81 ("Excellent")	1,500	±2.5%	face-to-face interview		

== Trust ratings ==
Fieldwork date	Segment polled	Polling group	Big trust	Small/ No trust	Undecided (Note: or "Moderate trust" (for PUBLiCUS Asia))	Net trust (SWS)	Sample size	Margin of error	Polling method	Question wording	Source(s)
June 24–27, 2016	adults (18 years old and above)	SWS	84	5	11	+79 ("Excellent")	1,200	±3.0%	face-to-face interview		
July 2–8, 2016	adults (18 years old and above)	Pulse Asia	91	0.2	8		1,200	±3.0%	face-to-face interview		
September 24–27, 2016	adults (18 years old and above)	SWS	83	8	9	+76 ("Excellent")	1,200	±3.0%	face-to-face interview	(Note: "Maaari po bang sabihin ninyo kung ang pagtitiwala ninyo kay (RODY DUTERTE) ay Napakalaki, Medyo malaki, Hindi tiyak kung malaki o maliit, Medyo maliit, Napakaliit, o Wala pa kayong narinig o nabasa kahit na kailan tungkol kay (name of personality)? Pakisabi ang sagot ninyo sa pamamagitan ng paglagay ng mga kard sa naaangkop na lugar sa rating board na ito." [transl. "Please indicate if your trust/faith in (RODY DUTERTE) is Very much, Somewhat much, Undecided if much or little, Somewhat little, Very little, or You have not heard or read anything about (RODY DUTERTE) ever? You may indicate your answers by placing each card on the appropriate box on this rating board."])	
September 25–October 1, 2016	adults (18 years old and above)	Pulse Asia	86	3	11		1,200	±3.0%	face-to-face interview		
December 3–6, 2016	adults (18 years old and above)	SWS	81	9	10	+72 ("Excellent")	1,500	±3.0%	face-to-face interview		
December 6–11, 2016	adults (18 years old and above)	Pulse Asia	83	4	13		1,200	±3.0%	face-to-face interview		
March 15–20, 2017	adults (18 years old and above)	Pulse Asia	76	5	18		1,200	±3.0%	face-to-face interview		
March 25–28, 2017	adults (18 years old and above)	SWS	80	10	11	+70 ("Excellent")	1,200	±3.0%	face-to-face interview		
June 24–29, 2017	adults (18 years old and above)	Pulse Asia	81	5	14		1,200	±3.0%	face-to-face interview		
September 24–30, 2017	adults (18 years old and above)	Pulse Asia	80	6	14		1,200	±3.0%	face-to-face interview		
December 10–15, 17, 2017	adults (18 years old and above)	Pulse Asia	82	6	13		1,200	±3.0%	face-to-face interview		
June 15–21, 2018	registered voters (18 years old and above)	Pulse Asia	87	2	11		1,800	±2.0%	face-to-face interview		
June 27–30, 2018	adults (18 years old and above)	SWS	70	13	18	+57 ("Very good")	1,200	±3.0%	face-to-face interview		
September 1–7, 2018	adults (18 years old and above)	Pulse Asia	72	9	19		1,800	±2.3%	face-to-face interview		
September 15–23, 2018	adults (18 years old and above)	SWS	74	12	14		1,500	±3.0%	face-to-face interview		
December 14–21, 2018	adults (18 years old and above)	Pulse Asia	76	6	17		1,800	±2.3%	face-to-face interview		
June 24–30, 2019	adults (18 years old and above)	Pulse Asia	85	4	11		1,200	±2.8%	face-to-face interview		
September 16–22, 2019	adults (18 years old and above)	Pulse Asia	74	9	18		1,200	±2.8%	face-to-face interview		
August 1–11, 2020	registered voters (18 years old and above)	PUBLiCUS Asia	55	24			1,500		online survey questionnaire		
December 3–9, 2020	registered voters	PUBLiCUS Asia	62	16			1,500				
March 20–29, 2021	registered voters	PUBLiCUS Asia	55	22			1,500				
July 13–19, 2021	registered voters	PUBLiCUS Asia	50	25			1,500				
December 6–10, 2021		PUBLiCUS Asia	55				1,500				
March 30–April 6, 2022	registered voters	PUBLiCUS Asia	61	17			1,500	±3.0%			
March 5–10, 2022		OCTA Research	69								
June 16–22, 2022		PUBLiCUS Asia	69	11			1,500				

== See also ==
- Opinion polling for the 2016 Philippine presidential election
- Rodrigo Duterte 2016 presidential campaign
