= Opinion polling for the 2007 Philippine Senate election =

Opinion polling (locally known as "surveys") is carried out by two major polling firms: Social Weather Stations (SWS), and Pulse Asia, with a handful of minor polling firms.

The Philippines uses plurality-at-large voting for senate elections. A voter has up to 12 votes, with the twelve candidates with the highest number of votes being elected. Political parties produce tickets; if their slate fail to reach 12 members, they may recruit other candidates from other parties as guest candidates; these guest candidates are not obliged to follow the policies of the slates that adopted them. Each candidate may be a member of different slates.

A typical poll asks a person to name twelve persons one would vote for in the senate election. A pollster then ranks all candidates from highest to lowest; the candidates at the top 12 are deemed "safe", while those below the top 12 but whose margin of error is within the 12th placed candidate's figure are "statistically tied" with the 12th placed candidate. In this system, a pollster can determine how many seats each ticket can win since the entire country is a single at-large "district"; this is unlike polling in other countries not using proportional representation for elections in legislatures where while a poll may give how a party may perform in the national vote but the number of seats that could have won is otherwise distorted due to the way the districts are drawn or to local variations.

== Winning candidates ==
Pollster		Pulse Asia	SWS	Pulse Asia	SWS	Pulse Asia	SWS	SWS
Date(s) administered		January 25–28, 2007	February 22–27, 2007	February 26–March 5, 2007	March 15–18, 2007	April 3–5, 2007	April 14–17, 2007	May 2–4, 2007
Sample size		1,200	1,200	1,200	1,200	1,200	1,200	1,200
Margin of error		±3.0%	±3.0%	±3.0%	±3.0%	±3.0%	±3.0%	±3.0%
Candidates (Party; ticket)	1	Legarda (NPC; GO), 46.6%	Pangilinan (LP; Ind), 57%	Legarda (NPC; GO), 56.8%	Legarda (NPC; GO), 58%	Legarda (NPC; GO), 56.8%	Legarda (NPC; GO), 58%	Legarda (NPC; GO), 59%
Candidates (Party; ticket)	2	Lacson (UNO; GO), 34.6% Pangilinan (LP; Ind), 34.6%	Legarda (NPC; GO), 54%	Lacson (UNO; GO), 41.1%	Villar (NP; GO), 57%	Escudero (NPC; GO), 47.2%	Villar (NP; GO), 45%	Villar (NP; GO), 46%
Candidates (Party; ticket)	3	Lacson (UNO; GO), 34.6% Pangilinan (LP; Ind), 34.6%	Villar (NP; GO), 52%	Pangilinan (LP; Ind), 39.4%	Pangilinan (LP; Ind), 48%	Villar (NP; GO), 47.0%	Escudero (NPC; GO), 41% Lacson (UNO; GO), 41%	Escudero (NPC; GO), 43%
Candidates (Party; ticket)	4	Cayetano (NP; GO), 31.7%	Cayetano (NP; GO), 43%	Escudero (NPC; GO), 35.5%	Lacson (UNO; GO), 42%	Lacson (UNO; GO), 43.9%	Escudero (NPC; GO), 41% Lacson (UNO; GO), 41%	Pangilinan (LP; Ind), 41%
Candidates (Party; ticket)	5	Sotto (NPC; TU), 28.8%	Lacson (UNO; GO), 42%	Recto (Lakas; TU), 35.2%	Escudero (NPC; GO), 40%	Pangilinan (LP; Ind), 38.8%	Pangilinan (LP; Ind), 39%	Lacson (UNO; GO), 39%
Candidates (Party; ticket)	6	Villar (NP; GO), 26.4%	Recto (Lakas; TU), 37%	Villar (NP; GO), 35.0%	Cayetano (NP; GO), 39%	Cayetano (NP; GO), 38.2%	Recto (Lakas; TU), 36%	Recto (Lakas; TU), 36% Aquino (LP; GO), 36%
Candidates (Party; ticket)	7	Recto (Lakas; TU), 26.0%	Escudero (NPC; GO), 36%	Arroyo (KAMPI; TU), 34.5%	Recto (Lakas; TU), 37%	Honasan (Ind; Ind), 35.7%	Angara (LDP; TU), 35%	Recto (Lakas; TU), 36% Aquino (LP; GO), 36%
Candidates (Party; ticket)	8	Arroyo (KAMPI; TU), 25.8%	Sotto (NPC; TU), 31%	Aquino (LP; GO), 34.2%	Angara (LDP; TU), 32%	Aquino (LP; GO), 35.5%	Arroyo (KAMPI; TU), 32%	Cayetano (NP; GO), 34%
Candidates (Party; ticket)	9	Ejercito (PMP; GO), 25.7%	Aquino (LP; GO), 30% Osmeña (UNO; GO), 30%	Angara (LDP; TU), 32.1%	Honasan (Ind; Ind), 29%	Recto (Lakas; TU), 35.4%	Cayetano (NP; GO), 31%	Honasan (Ind; Ind), 32% Zubiri (Lakas; TU), 32%
Candidates (Party; ticket)	10	Pimentel (PDP Laban; GO), 24.4%	Aquino (LP; GO), 30% Osmeña (UNO; GO), 30%	Cayetano (NP; GO), 30.9%	Aquino (LP; GO), 28% Arroyo (KAMPI; TU), 28%	Angara (LDP; TU), 35.2%	Sotto (NPC; TU), 30%	Honasan (Ind; Ind), 32% Zubiri (Lakas; TU), 32%
Candidates (Party; ticket)	11	Angara (LDP; TU), 24.0%	Arroyo (KAMPI; TU), 29%	Honasan (Ind; Ind), 27.3%	Aquino (LP; GO), 28% Arroyo (KAMPI; TU), 28%	Arroyo (KAMPI; TU), 33.4%	Honasan (Ind; Ind), 28% Aquino (LP; GO), 28% Pimentel (PDP Laban; GO), 28%	Arroyo (KAMPI; TU), 31% Angara (LDP; TU), 35%
Candidates (Party; ticket)	12	Honasan (Ind; Ind), 23.3%	Honasan (Ind; Ind), 28%	Sotto (NPC; TU), 25.4%	Sotto (NPC; TU), 26% Osmeña (UNO; GO), 26%	Zubiri (Lakas; TU), 32.0%	Honasan (Ind; Ind), 28% Aquino (LP; GO), 28% Pimentel (PDP Laban; GO), 28%	Arroyo (KAMPI; TU), 31% Angara (LDP; TU), 35%
Candidates (Party; ticket)	13	Escudero (NPC; GO), 23.2%	Pimentel (PDP Laban; GO), 27% Angara (LDP; TU), 27%	Pimentel (PDP Laban; GO), 23.1%	Sotto (NPC; TU), 26% Osmeña (UNO; GO), 26%	Pimentel (PDP Laban; GO), 30.1%	Honasan (Ind; Ind), 28% Aquino (LP; GO), 28% Pimentel (PDP Laban; GO), 28%	Sotto (NPC; TU), 26%
Candidates (Party; ticket)	14	Aquino (LP; GO), 22.5%	Magsaysay (Lakas; TU), 22.4%	Pimentel (PDP Laban; GO), 25%	Sotto (NPC; TU), 29.2%	Zubiri (Lakas; TU), 25%	Pimentel (PDP Laban; GO), 25%	
15	Osmeña (UNO; GO), 17.9%	Defensor (Lakas; TU), 21%	Roco (Aksyon; GO), 22.4%	Defensor (Lakas; TU), 21%	Roco (Aksyon; GO), 23%	Roco (Aksyon; GO), 27.1%	Defensor (Lakas; TU), 24% Trillanes (UNO; GO), 24%	
None Refused Undecided		12.2%	14%	10%	10.6%	8.8%	12%	13%

== Seats won ==
Candidates who were not make it to the top 12, but were within the margin of error from the 12th-placed candidate, are denoted by figures inside the parenthesis.

Pollster	Date(s) administered	Sample size	Margin of error	Parties									Coalitions		
Pollster	Date(s) administered	Sample size	Margin of error	KAMPI	Lakas	LDP	LP	NP	NPC	PDP Laban	UNO	Ind	GO	Ind	TEAM Unity
SWS	May 2–4, 2007	1,200	±3.0%	1	2	1	2	2	2	1	1	1	6	2	4
SWS	Apr 14–17, 2007	1,200	±3.0%	1	1(+1)	1	2	2	3	1	1	1	6(+1)	2	4(+1)
Pulse Asia	Apr 3–5, 2007	1,200	±3.0%	1	2	1	2	2	3	0(+1)	2	1	7(+1)	2	4
SWS	Mar 15–18, 2007	1,200	±3.0%	1	1	1	2	2	3	0(+1)	1(+1)	1	6(+1)	2	5
Pulse Asia	Feb 26–Mar 5, 2007	1,200	±3.0%	1	1(+1)	1	2	2	3	0(+1)	1	1	6(+2)	2	4(+1)
SWS	Feb 22–27, 2007	1,200	±3.0%	1	1	0(+1)	2	2	3	0(+1)	2	1	6(+1)	2	4(+1)
Pulse Asia	Jan 25–28, 2007	1,200	±3.0%	1	1	1	1(+1)	2	2(+1)	1	1	1	5(+2)	2	4
