= 2022 Pasay local elections =

21st City elections in Pasay

2022 Pasay mayoral elections
- May 9, 2022
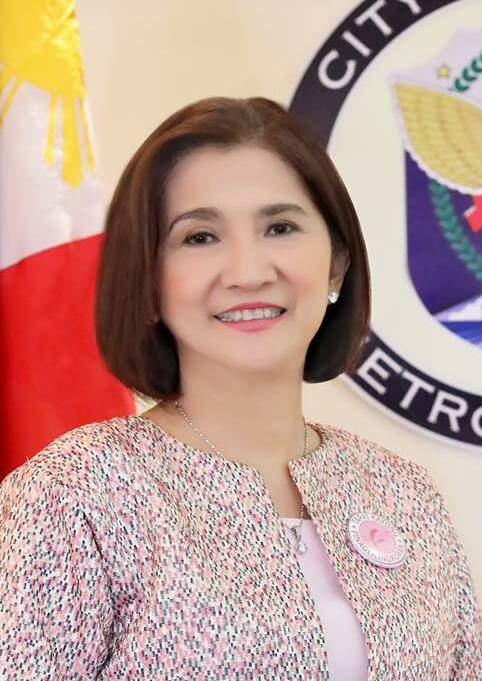
Nominee	Imelda "Emi" Calixto-Rubiano	Richard Advincula	Edward "ET" Togonon
Party	PDP–Laban	PRP	Reporma
Alliance	Team Calixto Forever	Team One Pasay	Tropang Togonon
Running mate	Waldetrudes "Ding" Del Rosario	Ernestina Bernabe-Carbajal	Hector Bongat
Popular vote	147,661	30,661	27,530
Percentage	70.88	14.72	13.22
Mayor before election
Imelda Calixto-Rubiano
PDP–Laban
Elected mayor
Imelda Calixto-Rubiano
PDP–Laban
- 2022 Congressional Elections
Candidate	Antonino "Tony" Calixto	Efren "Choy" Alas	Ramon "Ry" Yabut
Party	PDP–Laban	PRP	Liberal
Alliance	Team Calixto Forever	Team One Pasay	Team Leni Robredo
Popular vote	154,422	19,106	14,926
Percentage	78.09%	9.66%	7.55℅
Congressman before election
Antonino "Tony" Calixto
PDP–Laban
Elected Congressman
Antonino "Tony" Calixto
PDP–Laban

Local elections took place in Pasay on May 9, 2022 within the Philippine general election. The voters elected for the elective local posts in the city: the mayor, vice mayor, the congressman, and the councilors, six of them in the two districts of the city.

== Background ==
Mayor Imelda "Emi" Calixto-Rubiano ran for her second term. Her running mate was Waldetrudes "Ding" Del Rosario, daughter of Vice Mayor Noel "Boyet" Del Rosario.

Former First District Councilor and defeated 2019 vice mayoral candidate Richard Advincula also ran. His running mate was former City Administrator and former Councilor Ernestina "Tina" Bernabe-Carbajal.

Former Manila Chief Prosecutor Edward Togonon ran for mayoralty for the second time. His running mate was Hector Bongat, who previously ran as councilor of Second District.

Rep. Antonino "Tony" Calixto ran for a second term. His opponents were Efren Alas (Team ABA), Ramon Yabut (Team Leni) and Jocelyn Sato (Tropang Togonon).

== Candidates ==
=== Administration coalition ===
Team Calixto Forever
Name	Party
For Member, House of Representatives
Tony Calixto	PDP–Laban
For Mayor
Emi Calixto-Rubiano	PDP–Laban
For Vice Mayor
Ding Del Rosario	LDP
For Councilor (1st District)
Ambet Alvina	PDP–Laban
Mark Calixto	PDP–Laban
Tonya Cuneta	PDP–Laban
Marlon Pesebre	PDP–Laban
Ding Santos	PDP–Laban
Grace Santos	PDP–Laban
For Councilor (2nd District)
Allo Arceo	PDP–Laban
Joey Calixto Isidro	PDP–Laban
Zeng Padua La Torre	PDP–Laban
Edith Wowee Manguerra	PDP–Laban
Allan Jen Panaligan	PDP–Laban
Donna Vendivel	PDP–Laban

=== Opposition coalitions ===
Team One Pasay/ABA (Advincula, Bernabe, Alas)
Name	Party
For House Of Representative
Choy Alas	PRP
For Mayor
Richard Advincula	PRP
For Vice Mayor
Tina Bernabe Carbajal	PRP
For Councilor (1st District)
Jhaz Advincula	PDDS
Bossing Morallos	PDDS
Boni Santillana	PDDS
Froilan Tancinco	PDDS
Miki Trinidad	PDDS
For Councilor (2nd District)
Botchock Batobato	PRP
Loida Bernas	PDDS
Vencio Carbajal	PRP
Ellan Marie Cipriano	WPP
Ferdie Espiritu	PRP
Danilo Pantia	Independent

Tropang Togonon
Name	Party
For Member, House of Representatives
Jocelyn Sato	Reporma
For Mayor
Edward Togonon	Reporma
For Vice Mayor
Hector Bongat	WPP
For Councilor (1st District)
Jao Bajao	WPP
Tiger Gabriel	PRP
Eleazar Garpa	WPP
For Councilor (2nd District)
Crio Chris Campo	WPP
Ellan Marie Cipriano	WPP

=== Other coalitions/candidates ===
UniTeam
Name	Party
For Councilor (1st District)
Marvin Nolasco	Independent
Ramon Sta Maria	Independent
For Councilor (2nd District)
Dok Jovi Baliao	Independent
Khen Magat	PFP
Manuel Taytayon	Independent
Maui "Okidocbong" Tolentino	WPP

Independent Candidates
Name	Party
For Councilor (1st District)
Ronjay Advincula	PROMDI
Richard Gerald Anderson	Independent

Team Onie Bayona
Name	Party
Tony Calixto	PDP–Laban
For Mayor
Emi Calixto-Rubiano	PDP–Laban
For Vice Mayor
Ding Del Rosario	LDP
For Councilor (2nd District)
Onie Bayona	PROMDI
Joey Calixto Isidro	PDP–Laban

Team Leni Robredo
Name	Party
For Member, House of Representatives
Ramon Yabut	Independent

== Opinion polling ==
=== For mayor ===
Source of poll aggregation	Dates administered	Richard Advincula	Emi Calixto-Rubiano	AJ Romero	Edward Togonon		
Source of poll aggregation	Dates administered	PRP	PDP-Laban	Independent	Reporma		
Source of poll aggregation	Dates administered	SWS	February 19-22, 2022	7%	83%	0.2%	8%

=== For vice mayor ===
Source of poll aggregation	Dates administered	Tina Bernabe-Carbajal	Hector Bongat	Jessie Cruz	Boyet Ding Del Rosario
SWS	February 19-22, 2022	13%	3%	2%	77%

=== For congressional lone district ===
Source of poll aggregation	Dates administered	Choy Alas	Tony Calixto	Jocelyn Sato	Ramon Yabut
SWS	February 19-22, 2022	5%	87%	2%	3%

== Results ==
Names written in bold-Italic are the re-elected incumbents while in italic are incumbents lost in elections.

=== For Representative ===
Rep. Antonino "Tony" Calixto defeated his closest rivals Efren Alas and Ramon Yabut.

Congressional Elections in Pasay's Lone District
Party	Candidate	Votes	%
**PDP–Laban**	**Antonino "Tony" Calixto**	**154,422**	**78.09%**
PRP	Efren “Choy” Alas	19,106	9.66%
Liberal	Ramon "Ry" Yabut	14,926	7.55%
Reporma	Jocelyn Sato	9,285	4.70%
Total votes		**197,739**	**100.00**
**Margin of victory**		135,316	77.98
PDP–Laban **hold**			

Popular vote percentage
**Calixto**	78.09%
Alas	9.66%
Yabut	7.55%
Sato	4.70%

=== For Mayor ===
Mayor Imelda "Emi" Calixto-Rubiano defeated former Councilor Richard Advincula and retired Chief Prosecutor Edward Togonon.

Pasay Mayoral Elections
Party	Candidate	Votes	%
**PDP–Laban**	**Imelda "Emi" Calixto-Rubiano**	**147,661**	**70.88%**
PRP	Richard Advincula	30,661	14.72%
Reporma	Edward Togonon	27,530	13.22%
Independent	AJ Romero	2,467	1.18%
Total votes		**208,319**	**100.00**
**Margin of victory**		117,000	65.61
PDP–Laban **hold**			

Popular vote percentage
**Calixto-Rubiano**	70.88%
Advincula	14.72%
Togonon	13.22%
Romero	1.18%

=== For Vice Mayor ===
Waldetrudes "Ding" Del Rosario, daughter of Vice Mayor Noel "Boyet" Del Rosario, defeated her closest rival, former Councilor and former City Administrator Ernestina "Tina" Bernabe-Carbajal in a huge margin.

Pasay Vice Mayoral Elections
Party	Candidate	Votes	%
**LDP**	**Waldetrudes "Ding" Del Rosario**	**130,138**	**69.35%**
PRP	Ernestina "Tina" Bernabe-Carbajal	38,479	20.51%
WPP	Hector Bongat	12,336	6.57%
Independent	Jessie Cruz	6,703	3.57%
Total votes		**187,656**	**100.00**
**Margin of victory**		91,659	54.36
LDP **hold**			

Popular vote percentage
**Del Rosario**	69.35%
Bernabe-Carbajal	20.51%
Bongat	6.57%
Cruz	3.57%

=== For Councilors ===
Party	Votes	%	Seats
PDP–Laban/Team Calixto	712,494	72.88	11
PROMDI	67,521	6.91	–
PDDS/PRP/Team ABA	61,933	6.34	–
PFP	47,963	4.91	1
WPP/PRP/Tropang Togonon	28,172	2.88	–
Independent	59,491	6.09	–
Ex officio seats			2
**Total**	**977,574**	**100.00**	**14**

==== First District ====
The entire slate of Team Calixto were re-elected.

City Council Elections in Pasay's First District
Party	Candidate	Votes	%
**PDP–Laban**	**Mark Anthony Calixto**	**71,738**	
**PDP–Laban**	**Mary Grace Santos**	**67,976**	
**PDP–Laban**	**Marlon Pesebre**	**65,233**	
**PDP–Laban**	**Ma. Antonia "Tonya" Cuneta**	**64,953**	
**PDP–Laban**	**Abraham Albert "Ambet" Alvina**	**55,367**	
**PDP–Laban**	**Ricardo "Ding" Santos**	**52,197**	
PROMDI	Ronjay Advincula	40,895	
PDDS	Justine Jane "Jhaz" Advincula	27,125	
Independent	Richard Anderson	20,025	
PDDS	Bonifacio "Miki" Trinidad	11,002	
WPP	Eleazar "Boyet" Garpa	10,089	
Independent	Melvin Nolasco	6,139	
Independent	Ramon Sta. Maria	5,803	
PDDS	Bonifacio "Boni" Santillana	5,660	
PDDS	Jovino "Bossing" Morallos	5,162	
PDDS	Froilan "Allan" Tancinco	4,864	
PRP	Michael Angelo "Tiger" Gabriel	4,847	
WPP	Jaomar Leslee "Jao" Bajao	4,105	
Total votes		**523,180**	**100.00**

Party or alliance		Votes	%	Seats
PDP-Laban Team Calixto		377,464	72.15	6
Independent Coalition	Progressive Movement for the Devolution of Initiatives	40,895	7.82	0
Independent Coalition	Independent	20,025	3.83	0
Independent Coalition	Total	60,920	11.64	0
PDDS Team ABA		53,813	10.29	0
Tropang Togonon	Labor Party Philippines	14,194	2.71	0
Tropang Togonon	People's Reform Party	4,847	0.93	0
Tropang Togonon	Total	19,041	3.64	0
Independent under UniTeam		11,942	2.28	0
**Total**		**523,180**	**100.00**	**6**

==== Second District ====
Three of the six re-elected incumbents were:

- Jose "Joey" Isidro Jr.
- Editha "Wowee" Manguerra
- Donnabel Vendivel

Other incumbents were:

- Allan Panaligan, replaced by his wife, Jennifer "Jen"
- Arnel Regino Arceo, replaced by his son, Brgy. 60 Councilman Angelo Nicol "Allo" Arceo.
- Aileen Padua-La Torre, replaced by his husband, Brgy. 59 Chairman Zengelbert "Zeng" La Torre but lost, placing **7th**.

Newly-elected councilors were:

- King Marlon "Khen" Magat, 2019 candidate for councilor.
- Jennifer Panaligan, wife of term-limited Allan.
- Brgy. 60 Councilman Angelo Nicol "Allo" Arceo, son of term-limited Councilor Arnel Regino "Moti" who later won as chairman of Brgy. 60 last 2023 elections.

Former Councilor Noel "Onie" Bayona failed again to return in city council, placing 9th.

Ma. Czarina Lou Tolentino, daughter of former Acting Vice Mayor and Second District Councilor Arvin "Bong" Tolentino lost, placing 8th.

City Council Elections in Pasay's Second District
Party	Candidate	Votes	%
**PDP–Laban**	**Jose "Joey" Isidro Jr.**	**70,656**	**31.99**
**PDP–Laban**	**Edith "Wowee" Manguerra**	**67,678**	**30.64**
**PDP–Laban**	**Donnabel Vendivel**	**58,414**	**26.45**
**PDP–Laban**	**Jennifer "Jen" Panaligan**	**53,783**	**24.35**
**PFP**	**King Marlon "Khen" Magat**	**47,963**	**21.72**
**PDP–Laban**	**Angelo Nicol "Allo" Arceo**	**45,819**	**20.74**
PDP–Laban	Zengelbert "Zeng Padua" La Torre	38,680	17.51
WPP	Ma. Czarina Lou "Mr. Okidocbong" Tolentino	32,429	14.68
PROMDI	Noel "Onie" Bayona	26,626	12.06
Independent	Jovita Baliao	18,986	8.60
WPP	Crio Chris Campo	9,077	4.11
PRP	Eduardo "Botchock" Batobato	5,930	2.68
PRP	Ferdinand "Ferdie" Espiritu	5,612	2.54
PDDS	Sherwin Santos	5,204	2.36
WPP	Ellan Marie Cipriano	4,901	2.22
PRP	Vivencio "Vince" Carbajal	4,723	2.14
Independent	Manuel Taytayon	4,539	2.06
Independent	Danilo Pantia	3,999	1.81
PDDS	Loida Bernas	2,916	1.32
Total votes		**507,935**	**100.00**

Party or alliance		Votes	%	Seats
PDP-Laban Team Calixto		335,030	65.96	5
Independent under UniTeam	Partido Federal ng Pilipinas	47,963	9.44	1
Independent under UniTeam	Progressive Movement for the Devolution of Initiatives	32,429	6.38	0
Independent under UniTeam	Independent	18,986	3.74	0
Independent under UniTeam	Total	99,378	19.57	1
Independent Coalition	Progressive Movement for the Devolution of Initiatives	26,626	5.24	0
Independent Coalition	Independent	4,539	0.89	0
Independent Coalition	Total	31,165	6.14	0
Team ABA	People's Reform Party	16,265	3.20	0
Team ABA	Pederalismo ng Dugong Dakilang Samahan	8,120	1.60	0
Team ABA	Independent	3,999	0.79	0
Team ABA	Total	28,384	5.59	0
Tropang Togonon		13,978	2.75	0
**Total**		**507,935**	**100.00**	**6**
