= Felipe B. Miranda =

Filipino political scientist

Felipe B. Miranda is a Filipino political scientist and public opinion expert based at the University of the Philippines Diliman (where he holds the rank of professor emeritus). He is a founding fellow and chairperson of Social Weather Stations and Pulse Asia respectively, the Philippines' leading opinion surveying firms.

He also served as chairperson of the Philippine Social Science Council, the umbrella organization of the country's learned societies in the social sciences. Professor Miranda also writes a column for The Philippine Star.

Miranda earned his B.A. in Political Science degree from Brandeis University in 1963 and later pursued graduate studies at the University of Chicago, obtaining M.A. in Political Science in 1968. He was also a Ph.D. candidate in the same year.
