= Mahar Mangahas =

Dr. Mahar Mangahas is the president of Philippine-based opinion survey firm Social Weather Stations (SWS). A former professor of economics at the University of the Philippines Diliman, he earned his Ph.D. in Economics from the University of Chicago under the tutelage of Milton Friedman (Nobel Prize in Economic Science,1974). The Filipino economic and social indicators expert also writes for the Philippine Daily Inquirer.

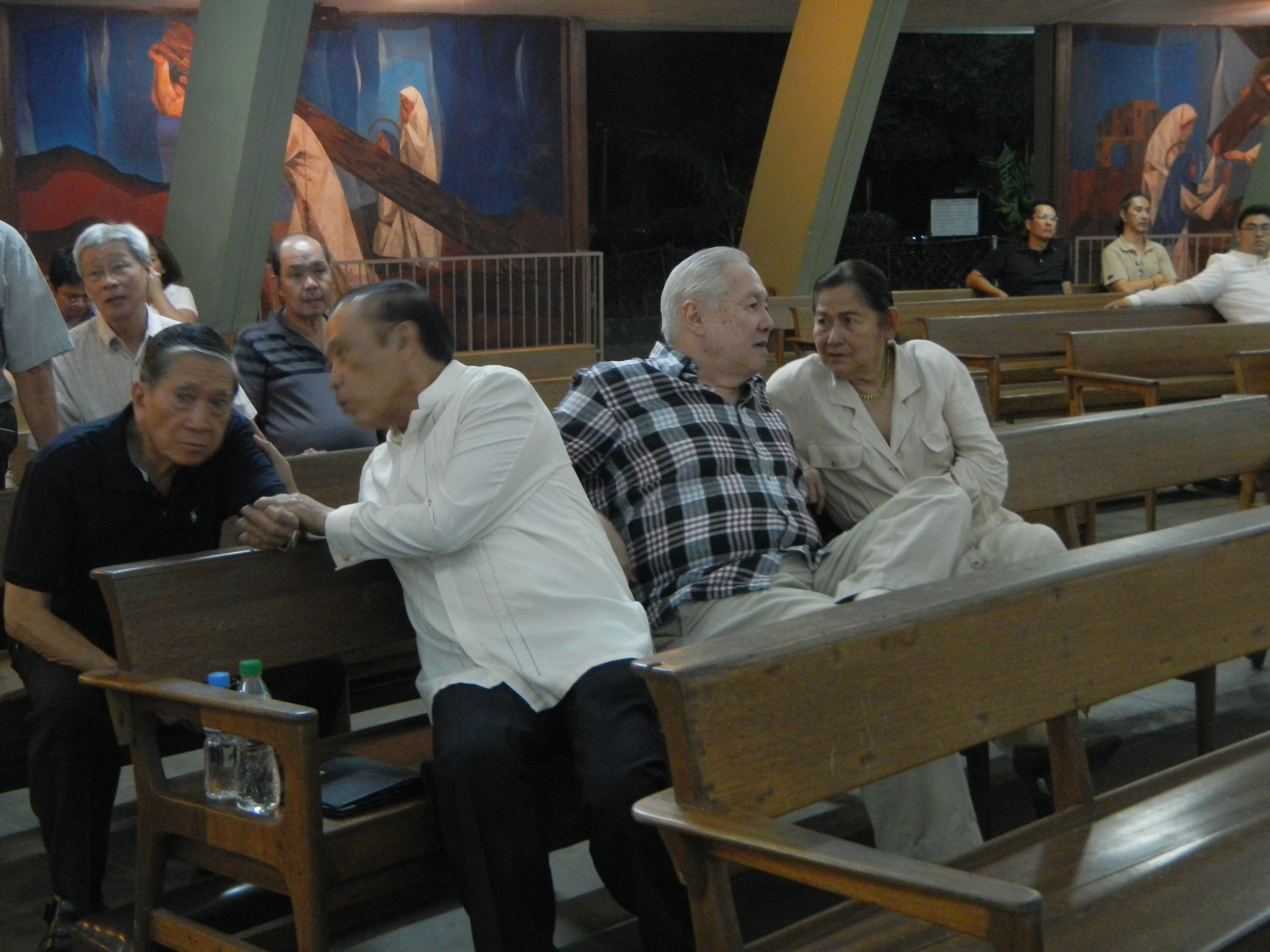
Mangahas (at the Onofre Corpuz April 1, 2013 eulogy).

== Career ==
Dr. Mangahas wrote books such as Measuring the quality of life: Philippine social indicators, Labor absorption in Philippine agriculture, and The political economy of land reform and land distribution in the Philippines. Before he joined to do full-time work at SWS, he had a teaching stint at the School of Economics of the University of the Philippines.

=== DAP Social Indicators Project and BBC ===
In 1976, Mangahas was chosen to be the director of the DAP Social Indicators Project, while still serving as UPSE professor. The project measured poverty, health, education, the environment, political freedom, and political mobility. His success using subjective measures led him to work as a UNICEF advisor on social indicators in Malaysia (1977–78) and Indonesia (1981). In 1981, DAP offered Mangahas the position of vice-president of research. Later that year, printings of his book, Measuring the Quality of Life: A 1982 Social Weather Report, were halted. Mangahas was also part of the Bishops-Businessmen’s Conference for Human Development (BBC), where he worked in their research committee. In 1984, the BBC sent out a controversial national survey that found that opposition to Marcos’s administration was two-thirds. It was Mangahas’s job to direct and publicly present the findings. The next day, Mangahas resigned from DAP to avoid retaliation from his leaders.
