= Social marketing =

Use of marketing theory, skills and practices to achieve social change

Social marketing is a marketing approach which focuses on influencing behavior with the primary goal of achieving the common good. It utilizes the elements of commercial marketing and applies them to social issues. However, to see social marketing as only the use of standard commercial marketing practices to achieve non-commercial goals is an oversimplified view. Social marketing has existed for some time but has only started becoming a common term in recent decades. It was originally done using newspapers and billboards and has adapted to the modern world in many of the same ways commercial marketing has. The most common use of social marketing in today's society is through social media.

== Aims and origin ==
Traditional commercial marketing aims are primarily financial, though they can have positive social effects as well. In the context of public health, social marketing would promote general health, raise awareness and induce changes in behavior.

Social marketing is described as having "two parents". The "social parent" uses social science and social policy approaches. The "marketing parent" uses commercial and public sector marketing approaches. Social marketing has started to encompass a broader range of focus in recent years and now goes beyond influencing individual behavior. It promotes socio-cultural and structural change relevant to social issues. Consequently, social marketing scholars are beginning to advocate for a broader definition of social marketing: "Social marketing is the application of marketing principles to enable individual and collective ideas and actions in the pursuit of effective, efficient, equitable, fair and sustained social transformation". The new emphasis gives equal weight to the effects (efficiency and effectiveness) and the process (equity, fairness and sustainability) of social marketing programs. Together with a new social marketing definition that focuses on social transformation, there is also an argument that "a systems approach is needed if social marketing is to address the increasingly complex and dynamic social issues facing contemporary societies"

== Applications ==
The first documented evidence of the deliberate use of marketing to address a social issue comes from a 1963 reproductive health program led by K. T. Chandy at the Indian Institute of Management in Calcutta, India. K.T. Chandy and colleagues proposed, and subsequently implemented, a national family planning program with high quality, government brand condoms distributed and sold throughout the country at a low cost. The program included an integrated consumer marketing campaign run with active point of sale promotion. Retailers were trained to sell the product aggressively, and a new organization was created to implement the program.

In developing countries, the use of social marketing expanded to include social and behavior change applications some of which include: HIV prevention, control of childhood diarrhea (through the use of oral re-hydration therapies), malaria control and treatment, point-of-use water treatment, on-site sanitation methods, promoting vaccine confidence and the provision of basic health services more broadly.

Health promotion campaigns began applying social marketing in practice in the 1980s. In the United States, The National High Blood Pressure Education Program and the community heart disease prevention studies in Pawtucket, Rhode Island and at Stanford University demonstrated the effectiveness of the approach to address population-based risk factor behaviour change. Notable early developments also took place in Australia. These included the Victoria Cancer Council developing its anti-tobacco campaigns "Quit" (1988) and "SunSmart" (1988), and its campaign against skin cancer, which had the slogan "Slip! Slop! Slap!".

Since the 1980s, the field has rapidly expanded around the world to include active living communities, disaster preparedness and response, ecosystem and species conservation, environmental issues, development of volunteer or Indigenous workforces, financial literacy, global threats of antibiotic resistance, government corruption, improving the quality of health care, injury prevention, landowner education, marine conservation and ocean sustainability, patient-centered health care, reducing health disparities, sustainable consumption, transportation demand management, water treatment and sanitation systems and youth gambling problems, among other social needs (See).

The impact of such social marketing campaigns are not always well documented. One study found that health awareness days can potentially raise knowledge about the causes of public health problems and promote an environment that supports policy changes, but noted that the accuracy of information shared is critical. On the other hand, there is some evidence to show that species awareness days meant to increase biodiversity and conservation awareness can lead to an increase in awareness through internet search for information, and an increase in conservation fund-raising by charities and advocacy groups.

On a wider front, by 2007, the government in the United Kingdom announced the development of its first social marketing strategy for all aspects of health. In 2010, the US national health objectives included increasing the number of state health departments that report using social marketing in health promotion and disease prevention programs and increasing the number of schools of public health that offer courses and workforce development activities in social marketing.

Two other public health applications include the CDC's CDCynergy training and software application and SMART (Social Marketing and Assessment Response Tool) in the U.S.

Social marketing theory and practice have progressed in several countries such as the US, Canada, Australia, New Zealand and the UK, and in the latter a number of key government policy papers have adopted a strategic social marketing approach. Publications such as "Choosing Health" in 2004, "It's our health!" in 2006 and "Health Challenge England" in 2006, represent steps to achieve a strategic and operational use of social marketing. In India, AIDS controlling programs are largely using social marketing and social workers are largely working for it. Most of the social workers are professionally trained for this task.

A variation of social marketing has emerged as a systematic way to foster more sustainable behavior. Referred to as community-based social marketing (CBSM) by Canadian environmental psychologist Doug McKenzie-Mohr, CBSM strives to change the behavior of communities to reduce their impact on the environment. Realizing that simply providing information is usually not sufficient to initiate behavior change, CBSM uses tools and findings from social psychology to discover the perceived barriers to behavior change and ways of overcoming these barriers. Among the tools and techniques used by CBSM are focus groups and surveys (to discover barriers) and commitments, prompts, social norms, social diffusion, feedback and incentives (to change behavior). The tools of CBSM have been used to foster sustainable behavior in many areas, including energy conservation, environmental regulation, recycling and litter cleanup.

In recent years, the concept of strategic social marketing has emerged, which identifies that social change requires action at the individual, community, socio-cultural, political and environmental level, and that social marketing can and should influence policy, strategy and operational tactics to achieve pro-social outcomes.

Other social marketing can be aimed at products deemed, at least by proponents, as socially unacceptable. One of the most notable is People for the Ethical Treatment of Animals (PETA), which for many years has waged social marketing campaigns against the use of natural fur products. The campaigns' efficacy has been subject to dispute.

== Usages ==
Social marketing uses the benefits of doing social good to secure and maintain customer engagement. In social marketing the distinguishing feature is therefore its "primary focus on social good, and it is not a secondary outcome. Not all public sector and not-for-profit marketing is social marketing.

Public sector bodies can use standard marketing approaches to improve the promotion of their relevant services and organizational aims. This can be very important but should not be confused with social marketing where the focus is on achieving specific behavioral goals with specific audiences in relation to topics relevant to social good (e.g., health, sustainability, recycling, etc.). For example, a 3-month marketing campaign to encourage people to get an H1N1 vaccine is more tactical in nature and should not be considered social marketing. A campaign that promotes and reminds people to get regular check-ups and all of their vaccinations when they're supposed to encourage a long-term behavior change that benefits society. It can, therefore, be considered social marketing.

Social marketing can be confused with commercial marketing. A commercial marketer may only seek to influence a buyer to purchase a product. Social marketers have more difficult goals. They want to make potentially difficult and long-term behavior changes in target populations, which may or may not involve purchasing a product. For example, reducing cigarette smoking or encouraging the use of condoms have difficult challenges to overcome that go beyond purchasing decisions.

Social marketing is sometimes seen as being restricted to a client base of non-profit organizations, health services groups, the government agency. However, the goal of inducing social change is not restricted to this narrow spectrum of organizations. Corporations, for example, can be clients. Public relations or social responsibility departments may champion social causes such as funding for the arts, which would involve social marketing.

Social marketing should not be confused with the societal marketing concept which was a forerunner of sustainable marketing in integrating issues of social responsibility into commercial marketing strategies. In contrast to that, social marketing uses commercial marketing theories, tools, and techniques to social issues.

Social marketing applies a "customer-oriented" approach and uses the concepts and tools used by commercial marketers in pursuit of social goals like anti-smoking campaigns or fundraising for NGOs.

Social marketers must create a competitive advantage by constantly adapting to and instigating change. With climate change in mind, adaptations to market changes are likely to be more successful if actions are guided by knowledge of the forces shaping market behaviors and insights that enable the development of sustainable competitive advantages.

== Confusion ==
In 2006, Jupitermedia announced its "Social Marketing" service, with which it aims to enable website owners to profit from social media. Despite protests from the social marketing communities over the perceived hijacking of the term, Jupiter stuck with the name. However, Jupiter's approach is more correctly (and commonly) referred to as social media optimization.

== History ==
Many scholars ascribe the beginning of the field of social marketing to an article published by G.D. Wiebe in the Winter 1951–1952 edition of Public Opinion Quarterly. In it, Wiebe posed a rhetorical question: "Why can't you sell brotherhood and rational thinking like you can sell soap?" He then went on to discuss what he saw as the challenges of attempting to sell a social good as if it were a commodity, thus identifying social marketing (though he did not label it as such) as a discipline unique from commodity marketing. Yet, Wilkie & Moore (2003) note that the marketing discipline has been involved with questions about the intersection of marketing and society since its earliest days as a discipline.

A decade later, organizations such as the KfW Entwicklungsbank in Germany, the Canadian International Development Agency, the Ministry for Foreign Affairs in The Netherlands, UK Department for International Development, US Agency for International Development, World Health Organization and the World Bank began sponsoring social marketing interventions to improve family planning and achieve other social goals in Africa, Sri Lanka, and elsewhere.

The next milestone in the evolution of social marketing was the publication of "Social Marketing: An Approach to Planned Social Change" in the Journal of Marketing by Philip Kotler and Gerald Zaltman. Kotler and Zaltman coined the term 'social marketing' and defined it as "the design, implementation, and control of programs calculated to influence the acceptability of social ideas and involving considerations of product planning, pricing, communication, distribution, and marketing research." They conclude that "social marketing appears to represent a bridging mechanism which links the behavior scientist's knowledge of human behavior with the socially useful implementation of what that knowledge allows."

Craig Lefebvre and June Flora introduced social marketing to the public health community in 1988, where it has been most widely used and explored. They noted that there was a need for "large scale, broad-based, behavior change focused programs" to improve public health (the community wide prevention of cardiovascular diseases in their respective projects) and outlined eight essential components of social marketing that still hold today:

1. A consumer orientation to realize organizational (social) goals
2. An emphasis on the voluntary exchanges of goods and services between providers and consumers
3. Research in audience analysis and segmentation strategies
4. The use of formative research in product and message design and the pretesting of these materials
5. An analysis of distribution (or communication) channels
6. Use of the marketing mix—using and blending product, price, place and promotion characteristics in intervention planning and implementation
7. A process tracking system with both integrative and control functions
8. A management process that involves problem analysis, planning, implementation and feedback functions

Speaking of what they termed "social change campaigns", Kotler and Ned Roberto introduced the subject by writing, "A social change campaign is an organized effort conducted by one group (the change agent) which attempts to persuade others (the target adopters) to accept, modify, or abandon certain ideas, attitudes, practices or behavior." Their 1989 text was updated in 2002 by Philip Kotler, Ned Roberto and Nancy Lee. In 2005, University of Stirling was the first university to open a dedicated research institute to Social Marketing, while in 2007, Middlesex University became the first university to offer a specialized postgraduate program in Health & Social Marketing.

In recent years there has been an important development to distinguish between "strategic social marketing" and "operational social marketing".

Social marketing is also being explored as a method for social innovation, a framework to increase the adoption of evidence-based practices among professionals and organizations, and as a core skill for public sector managers and social entrepreneurs. It is being viewed as an approach to design more effective, efficient, equitable and sustainable approaches to enhance social well-being that extends beyond individual behavior change to include creating positive shifts in social networks and social norms, businesses, markets and public policy.

Many examples exist of social marketing research, with over 120 papers compiled in a six volume set. For example, research now shows ways to reduce the intentions of people to binge drink or engage in dangerous driving. Martin, Lee, Weeks and Kaya (2013) suggests that understanding consumer personality and how people view others is important. People were shown ads talking of the harmful effects of binge drinking. People who valued close friends as a sense of who they are, were less likely to want to binge drink after seeing an ad featuring them and a close friend. People who were loners or who did not see close friends important to their sense of who they were reacted better to ads featuring an individual. A similar pattern was shown for ads showing a person driving at dangerous speeds. This suggests ads showing potential harm to citizens from binge drinking or dangerous driving are less effective than ads highlighting a person's close friends.

== See also ==
- Agenda-setting theory
- Brand
- Cause-related marketing
- Development communication
- Financial literacy
- Health promotion
- Jay Winsten
- Marketing
- Marketing mix
- Media intelligence
- The Tipping Point
