= Ned Roberto =

Filipino professor

- Roberto at AIM
- Education: De La Salle University; Kellogg School of Management
- Occupation: Professor
- Known for: Marketing

Eduardo L. Roberto or Ned Roberto is a Filipino professor who is considered Asia's foremost authority in marketing. He was the professor of international marketing at the Asian Institute of Management located in Metro Manila in the Philippines. He has written several marketing-related books and is currently a part of the editorial board of the International Journal of Research in Marketing. His areas of interest for teaching and research include marketing research, social marketing, and consumer behavior. He has also taught at the Northwestern University’s Kellogg Graduate School of Management Chicago Campus and at the Euro-Asia Centre of INSEAD Macau.

== Education ==
Roberto received his Doctor of Philosophy in Marketing and a Master in Business Administration degree from The Kellogg Management School of Northwestern University (1973.)

== Career ==
=== Board memberships ===
- He is the chairman and president of Roberto & Associates, Inc., (RAI) a marketing research and consulting agency.
- He is on the Editorial Board of the International Journal of Research in Marketing.

He also sits on the board of directors of several corporations.

=== Positions held ===
- He was the 1985 president of the Marketing and Opinion Research Society of the Philippines (MORES.)
- Executive Vice-President of Consumer Pulse Inc. (now known as AC Nielsen), the ASEAN's largest survey research organization.
- Vice-President of Media Pulse, Inc.
- Executive Director of the International Council for the Management of Population Programmes (ICOMP).

=== Consultancy ===
Roberto has done extensive consultancy work region-wide for both national and transnational corporations and multilateral agencies.

In the Philippines

Roberto has been a consultant for marketing planning, product management and marketing research to practically all of the leading multinational corporations in the consumer goods, pharmaceutical, household products, beverage, cosmetics, processed food, banking, advertising, and airline industries.

Overseas

Roberto has been consulted by several major multinational corporations in Australia, Hong Kong, Indonesia, Japan, Malaysia, Singapore, Thailand, and Taiwan.

International organisations

Roberto has also been involved in social marketing, planning & research, and consulting for international organizations such as the World Bank, the UN Fund for Population Activities, the International Labour Organization, the UN Development Programme, the Asian Development Bank, the Ford Foundation, the International Development Research Centre, the Population Council, and the UN Economic Commission for Asia and the Far East.

== Notable works ==
Marketing research

- Applied Marketing Research
- User-Friendly Marketing Research

Social marketing

- Strategic Decision Making in a Social Program (the first social marketing book, 1975.)
- Social Marketing: Strategies for Changing Public Behavior (co-authored with Philip Kotler)
- Social Marketing: Improving the quality of life (co-authored with Philip Kotler and Nancy Lee)

Market segmentation

- Strategic Market Segmentation
- A Guide to the Socio-Economic Classification of Filipino Consumers

Local governance

- Making Local Governance Work.

He has published several articles on marketing and social marketing in national and international journals, newspapers and has contributed chapters in major books of readings in the field of marketing, such as “Alleviating Poverty: A Macro/Micro Marketing Perspective,” Journal of Macromarketing, December 2006, pp. 233–39 (co-authored with Philip Kotler and Tony Leisner.)

== Awards and recognitions ==
- Philippine Marketing Association AGORA Award for Achievement in Marketing Education in 1983.
- Association of Marketing Educators of the Philippines´ 1st Lifetime Achievement Award as Marketing Educator in 2004.

== See also ==
- Marketing
- Social marketing
- Philip Kotler
- Philippine Daily Inquirer
