= Congressional canvass for the 2010 Philippine presidential election =

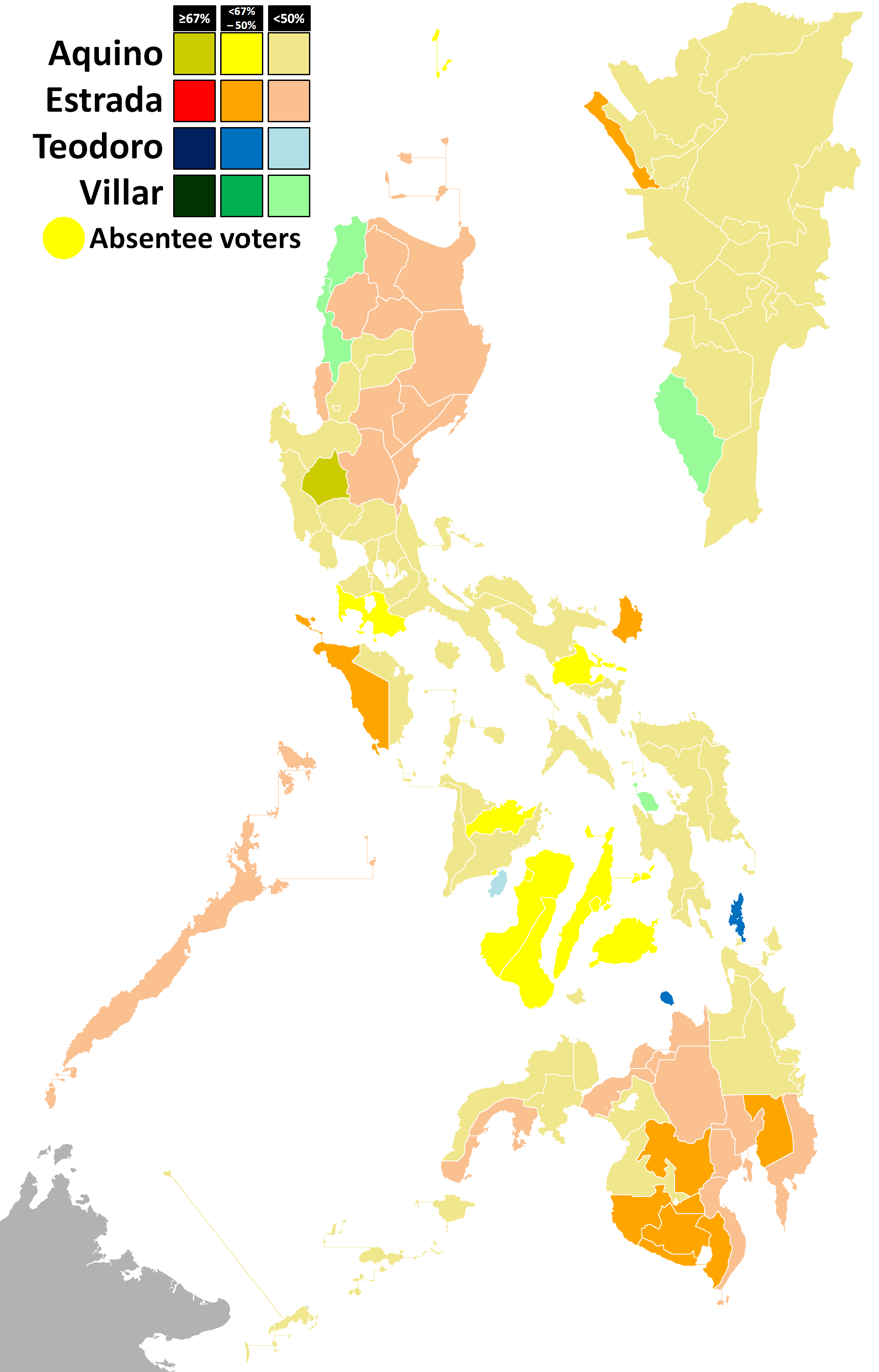
Canvassed provinces and cities for the presidential election.

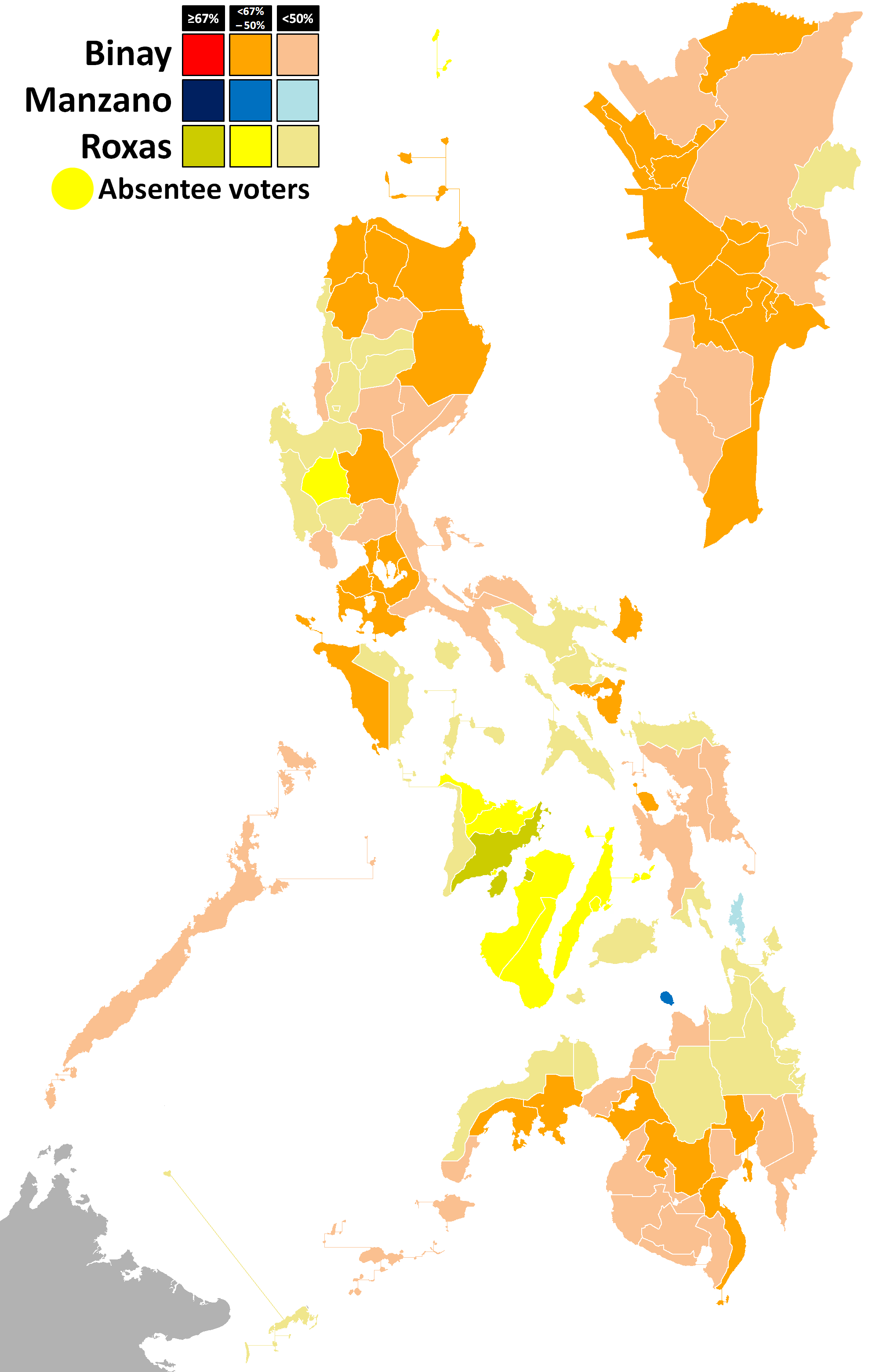
Canvassed provinces and cities for the vice presidential election. Loren Legarda and Bayani Fernando, despite having more votes than Edu Manzano, failed to win in any province or city where COCs had been canvassed.

The following is the official canvassing of votes by the Congress of the Philippines for the 2010 Philippine presidential and vice presidential election. The canvassing, originally scheduled to start on May 31, started on May 25, 2010, and ended on June 9, 2010. The Congress is mandated to declare a winner 30 days after the elections (June 9).

== Process ==
After voters had finished voting, the counting machines will then count the votes received by each candidate in each position. For positions elected on a national basis (president, vice president, senators and party-list representatives), the counting machine will then print an election return for that precinct, and will transmit the results to the municipal/city board of canvassers, Congress, Commission on Elections, the citizen's arm authorized by the commission, political parties, and others.

The city or municipality will then tally the votes for all positions and will issue two documents at its conclusion: a statement of votes where the votes obtained by candidates in each precinct in a city/municipality is stated; and a certificate of canvass (COC), a document in electronic and printed form containing the total votes in figures obtained by each candidate in the city or municipality. The city or municipal COC will either be sent electronically to Congress (if the city is an Independent city with its own legislative district) or to the provincial board of canvassers in which the process is repeated; this time the provincial COC will be sent to Congress.

Congress, sitting as the National Board of Canvassers, will canvass the votes to determine who among the candidates are elected president and vice president.

In theory, all of the votes from the election returns when added must be equal to the votes canvassed by Congress coming from the city/provincial COCs.

== Members of the canvassing committee ==
Instead of the whole Congress canvassing the votes, a committee comprised evenly between the Senate and the House of Representatives will canvass the votes at the Batasang Pambansa Complex in Quezon City, the home of the House of Representatives. The Senate President and the Speaker will co-chair the proceedings; previously, the majority leaders of both houses played this role. House Speaker Prospero Nograles announced the composition of the House delegation on May 21, as Senate Majority Floor Leader Migz Zubiri announced theirs on May 24.

Senate	Position	House of Representatives
Senate President Juan Ponce Enrile (PMP)	Co-chairpersons	House Speaker Prospero Nograles (Davao City, Lakas Kampi CMD)
Senate Majority Leader Migz Zubiri (Lakas Kampi CMD); Senate Minority Leader Aquilino Pimentel III (PDP-Laban); Rodolfo Biazon (Liberal); Alan Peter Cayetano (Nacionalista); Gregorio Honasan (Independent); Edgardo Angara (LDP); Bong Revilla (Lakas Kampi CMD); Joker Arroyo (Lakas Kampi CMD)	Members	House Majority Leader Arthur Defensor (Iloilo, Lakas Kampi CMD); House Minority Leader Ronaldo Zamora (San Juan, Nacionalista); House Senior Deputy Majority Leader Neptali Gonzales II (Mandaluyong, Liberal); House Senior Deputy Minority Leader Roilo Golez (Parañaque, Liberal); Crispin Remulla (Cavite, Nacionalista); Didagen Dilangalen (Maguindanao, Independent); Matias Defensor (Quezon City, Lakas Kampi CMD); Michael John Duavit (Rizal, NPC)
Francis Pangilinan (Liberal); Lito Lapid (Lakas Kampi CMD); Pia Cayetano (Nacionalista); Senate President pro tempore Jinggoy Estrada (PMP; see note below)	Alternates	Teodoro Locsin, Jr. (Makati, PDP-Laban); Rufus Rodriguez (Cagayan de Oro, PMP); Lorenzo Tañada III (Quezon, Liberal); Liwayway Vinzons-Chato (Camarines Norte; Liberal); Simeon Datumanong (Maguindanao, Lakas Kampi CMD); Giorgidi Aggabao (Isabela, NPC); Pedro Romualdo (Camiguin, Lakas Kampi CMD); Joseph Emilio Abaya (Cavite, Liberal); Eduardo Zialcita (Parañaque, Nacionalista)

Members of Congress who ran for president (Noynoy Aquino, Richard Gordon, Jamby Madrigal, and Manny Villar) and vice president (Loren Legarda and Mar Roxas) are banned from attending the proceedings. Senators Miriam Defensor Santiago and Francis Escudero recused themselves for actively supporting candidates for president and vice president (Defensor Santiago herself was a guest senatorial candidate of four parties), while Estrada, who also recused himself, will only sit to provide quorum.

Each political party is entitled to two lawyers who may file motions before Congress.

== Proceedings ==
Date	Scheduled start	Actual start	Ended	COCs canvassed
May 25	2:00 p.m.	2:52 p.m.	5:09 p.m.	0
May 26	2:00 p.m.	2:44 p.m.	8:45 p.m.	0
May 27	1:00 p.m.	1:55 p.m.	8:45 p.m.	5
May 28	1:00 p.m.		8:50 p.m.	126
May 31	1:00 p.m.	4:00 p.m.	10:10 p.m.	9
June 1	1:00 p.m.		8:31 p.m.	63
June 2	1:00 p.m.	1:40 p.m.		18
June 3	1:00 p.m.		8:58 p.m.	25
June 7	1:00 p.m.		9:13 p.m.	4
June 8	1:00 p.m.		2:48 p.m.	1
June 9	2:00 p.m.			N/A

=== May 25–28 ===
On May 25, while the Senate approved the rules governing the proceedings quickly, House members took an hour to approve the rules. Joel Villanueva of CIBAC party-list predicted that once the certificates of canvass from the incumbent Congressman was defeated will be checked, "expect these defeated lawmakers to raise hell." Speaker Nograles, himself beaten in the Davao City mayoralty election (he is term-limited to run for congressman this election), assured that the new president and vice president will be proclaimed simultaneously. Congress adjourned after approval of the rules and will reconvene on the afternoon of May 26.

On May 26, all Commission on Elections commissioners, Smartmatic executives and information technology experts where present before the joint canvassing committee. The Congressmen asked the commissioners on the matter of "two" separate certificates of canvass (COC) for the positions of president and vice president. Dilangalen remarked that in the 2004 election, there was only one COC for both positions; Commissioner Larrazabal replied that each COC, although printed in several pages, is one document, with Chairman Jose Melo adding that there is a separate COC per position per province. Arthur Defensor asked if this meant Congress should canvass the COCs separately, with Nograles replying that will be up for the canvassing committee to decide that. Other issues tackled the lack of digital signatures in the election returns, and the erroneous number of registered voters in the Smartmatic database ("256, 733, 195") when Enrile opened the server. Smartmatic president for Asia-Pacific Cesar Flores replied to Enrile that the erroneous figure was an error in the application "that was adding the number of registered voters from the PCOS [machines] from the precinct level and it was adding the number of registered voters from the municipal level…and from the province…Therefore, multiplying the number of registered voters", and that only voter turnout and not the results for all positions will be affected.

After starting 55 minutes late, representative Didagen Dilangalen questioned the authenticity of the automated elections and opposed moves to open the ballot boxes containing machine-generated COCs. Enrile sought a compromise by proposing the creation of a technical working group that will hold a separate inquiry in the legitimacy of the automated election results. Dilangalen left the plenary after Zubiri made the motion to open the COCs from overseas absentee voting (OAV). After and six hours of joint session, canvassing for manually counted COCs were begun with OAVs from Laos being the first COC canvassed. Aquino and Roxas led after the first day that the COCs were canvassed. COCs from Guam, Brunei, Papua New Guinea and Thailand were the other COCs canvassed before Congress adjourned for the day.

By the end of the week, the joint committee was avail to canvass 131 COCs, except for two: one COC from the Bahamas had irregularities and was deferred, while the COC from Iran was found to be empty. As well, 26 countries and territories recorded zero votes for all positions namely: Guyana, Barbados, Costa Rica, El Salvador, Guatemala, Honduras, Panama, Antigua and Barbuda, Cayman Islands, Saint Kitts and Nevis, Turks and Caicos Islands, Mozambique, Namibia, Swaziland, Zambia, Zimbabwe, Nepal, Dominican Republic, Madagascar, Malawi, Mauritius, Tanzania, and Iran (as stated before). This led to Senator Aquilino Pimentel, Jr. to question the COMELEC on the reason for the dismal result of overseas Filipinos failing to vote.

=== May 31–June 4 ===
The main crux of contention during the canvassing for the COCs transmitted electronically was the issue of null votes, i.e. overvotes, undervotes, abstentions, and votes were not tallied in CoCs because of incomplete transmission. The Aquino-Roxas Bantay Balota (ARBB, "Aquino-Roxas ballot watch") said that 3 million votes were considered null votes, and 10-15% of votes from Roxas' strongholds in Western Visayas and Central Visayas were wasted. In addition, according to them, if to 50-60% of the votes were for Roxas, he would've lost 250,000-300,000 votes. ARBB did not question null votes for the presidential election, where Aquino is leading. The commission, however, said that the nullified votes are the equivalent of "stray votes" before automation, and that rules on stray or null votes would apply even if votes were manually counted in an electoral protest, chairman Jose Melo said.

Other frequent objections by lawyers representing the candidates were the lowering of thresholds of votes canvassed locally, which were then transmitted to the commission's servers, and mismatching figures in the electronic and manual COCs.

At the end of the week, only five COCs are left to be canvassed. COCs from Davao City, Bacolod, Mountain Province, Eastern Samar and Lanao del Sur, in which some municipalities held rescheduled elections on June 4. Session will resume on June 7.

=== June 7–9 ===
With only five COCs left on June 7 waiting to be canvassed, the Roxas camp was insisting on having a manual audit on all null votes. Congress, saying that it not within their rules to count the null votes, disallowed the motions and proceeded to canvass the four COCs in their possession – the COC from Lanao del Sur had not been delivered. This after 28 clustered precincts in the province failed to hold elections on June 3, the date of their rescheduled elections. As a result, with all but COC canvassed, Aquino and Binay had unassailable leads.

On June 8, the Lanao del Sur COC was canvassed. In some precincts, Roxas had one or zero votes, and that there was 96% voter turnout in the province, revelations from Roxas' lawyer that representative Roilo Golez found to be "incredible . . . statistically improbable." The COC was still canvassed and Aquino and Binay will be proclaimed as president-elect and vice president-elect respectively, on June 9.

On June 9, in a joint public session, Congress proclaimed Aquino as the president-elect, and Binay as the vice president-elect amidst a chorus of cheers from the gallery After the joint session was opened, Senate President pro tempore Jinggoy Estrada read his father's concession speech. The majority leaders of both Houses, Migz Zubiri and Arthur Defensor, Sr. both delivered their endorsement speeches supporting adopting the results of the canvass. Senate minority Aquilino Pimentel endorsed the resolution, and branded the acronym "PCOS" as "President Cory's Only Son", referring to Senator Aquino. The House deputy leaders Neptali Gonzales II and Roilo Golez also delivered speeches endorsing the resolution. Zuburi motioned that the resolution be passed, and was passed with no objection; Defensor also did the same for the House and was adopted without objections. The Senate President and House Speaker motioned to the majority leaders of both houses to accompany the president-elect and vice-president-elect to the session hall. With the resumption the session, Binay was first ushered on to the rostrum where Enrile and Nograles raised his hands; Aquino was then led to the rostrum where Nograles and Enrile, the man who had jailed his father Ninoy Aquino, raised his hand in victory.

The joint session for the canvassing and proclamation ended in a record time of eight days. Aquino then held his first press conference as president-elect.

== Presidential election ==
Based on the official canvass of the Congress of the Philippines

Candidate	Party	Votes	%
Benigno Aquino III	Liberal Party	15,208,678	42.08
Joseph Estrada	Pwersa ng Masang Pilipino	9,487,837	26.25
Manny Villar	Nacionalista Party	5,573,835	15.42
Gilbert Teodoro	Lakas–Kampi–CMD	4,095,839	11.33
Eddie Villanueva	Bangon Pilipinas	1,125,878	3.12
Dick Gordon	Bagumbayan–VNP	501,727	1.39
Nicanor Perlas	Independent	54,575	0.15
Jamby Madrigal	Independent	46,489	0.13
John Carlos de los Reyes	Ang Kapatiran	44,244	0.12
Total		36,139,102	100.00
Valid votes		36,139,102	94.73
Invalid/blank votes (Note: Includes 181,985 votes for Vetellano Acosta (Kilusang Bagong Lipunan) who was disqualified after the ballots were printed.)		2,010,269	5.27
Total votes		38,149,371	100.00
Registered voters/turnout		51,317,073	74.34
Source: COMELEC

Province/City	Aquino		Estrada		Villar		Teodoro		Villanueva		Gordon		Perlas		Madrigal		De los Reyes		Acosta (Note: Votes for Vetellano Acosta are considered invalid.)
Province/City	Votes	%	Votes	%	Votes	%	Votes	%	Votes	%	Votes	%	Votes	%	Votes	%	Votes	%	Votes
Abra	15,713	14.16	33,151	29.88	30,941	27.89	27,623	24.90	2,421	2.18	530	0.48	278	0.25	177	0.16	111	0.10	603
Agusan del Norte	118,547	43.76	42,338	15.63	30,992	11.44	64,041	23.64	12,278	4.53	1,773	0.65	392	0.14	286	0.11	258	0.10	2,245
Agusan del Sur	74,265	31.14	60,651	25.43	25,781	10.81	62,705	26.29	13,403	5.62	758	0.32	495	0.21	214	0.09	220	0.09	1,371
Aklan	105,451	45.25	46,174	19.81	40,673	17.45	31,402	13.47	6,201	2.66	2,241	0.96	380	0.16	267	0.11	267	0.11	1,242
Albay	340,571	62.26	65,626	12.00	76,839	14.05	47,177	8.62	9,760	1.78	4,123	0.75	731	0.13	1,301	0.24	888	0.16	4,351
Antique	93,400	43.99	40,496	19.07	52,820	24.88	16,871	7.95	6,048	2.85	1,382	0.65	574	0.27	348	0.16	360	0.17	1,371
Apayao	5,176	11.68	18,566	41.90	13,167	29.72	5,222	11.79	1,815	4.10	183	0.41	77	0.17	69	0.16	33	0.07	178
Aurora	23,060	27.81	35,956	43.37	11,690	14.10	6,251	7.54	5,089	6.14	644	0.78	78	0.09	76	0.09	70	0.08	389
Bacolod	129,094	64.99	17,205	8.66	23,200	11.68	21,249	10.70	4,766	2.40	2,358	1.19	196	0.10	239	0.12	315	0.16	750
Baguio	42,603	39.99	12,808	12.02	13,381	12.56	27,326	25.65	5,686	5.34	4,019	3.77	301	0.28	267	0.25	140	0.13	273
Basilan	45,892	33.81	39,027	28.75	36,395	26.82	11,688	8.61	1,353	1.00	961	0.71	118	0.09	183	0.13	109	0.08	666
Bataan	130,322	36.67	105,072	29.57	77,066	21.69	23,255	6.54	12,271	3.45	6,256	1.76	385	0.11	453	0.13	292	0.08	919
Batanes	4,094	51.16	310	3.87	1,659	20.73	1,731	21.63	134	1.67	55	0.69	4	0.05	4	0.05	11	0.14	35
Batangas	629,977	60.37	187,900	18.01	92,835	8.90	84,241	8.07	35,029	3.36	10,653	1.02	740	0.07	1,140	0.11	1,062	0.10	3,580
Benguet	56,404	37.70	23,173	15.49	21,727	14.52	34,273	22.91	10,893	7.28	2,312	1.55	288	0.19	342	0.23	212	0.14	556
Biliran	21,270	29.47	10,700	14.83	25,281	35.03	11,866	16.44	2,315	3.21	357	0.49	142	0.20	101	0.14	131	0.18	600
Bohol	303,200	53.79	53,634	9.52	106,545	18.90	79,319	14.07	14,424	2.56	3,264	0.58	1,368	0.24	948	0.17	947	0.17	5,341
Bukidnon	157,417	31.44	200,449	40.04	95,039	18.98	29,304	5.85	13,662	2.73	1,870	0.37	1,259	0.25	563	0.11	1,107	0.22	7,958
Bulacan	521,549	45.96	344,413	30.35	95,129	8.38	74,168	6.54	67,184	5.92	28,348	2.50	1,260	0.11	1,542	0.14	1,169	0.10	3,012
Cagayan	127,198	28.73	143,911	32.51	99,962	22.58	54,659	12.35	12,502	2.82	2,650	0.60	698	0.16	615	0.14	466	0.11	2,439
Cagayan de Oro	69,554	33.82	93,767	45.59	13,274	6.45	19,828	9.64	6,657	3.24	1,937	0.94	284	0.14	165	0.08	214	0.10	1,399
Caloocan	195,571	45.87	131,936	30.94	30,989	7.27	36,853	8.64	17,174	4.03	12,087	2.83	591	0.14	697	0.16	465	0.11	1,061
Camarines Norte	94,705	47.19	63,048	31.42	21,705	10.82	12,554	6.26	6,173	3.08	1,691	0.84	239	0.12	333	0.17	235	0.12	1,232
Camarines Sur	315,681	46.53	122,885	18.11	148,509	21.89	69,722	10.28	13,958	2.06	4,779	0.70	811	0.12	1,222	0.18	825	0.12	4,113
Camiguin	9,749	21.82	3,334	7.46	2,185	4.89	28,784	64.41	447	1.00	75	0.17	72	0.16	23	0.05	18	0.04	194
Capiz	190,061	58.52	25,460	7.84	48,238	14.85	53,758	16.55	5,020	1.55	1,029	0.32	410	0.13	303	0.09	509	0.16	2,864
Catanduanes	35,434	28.63	70,591	57.04	8,580	6.93	4,959	4.01	2,921	2.36	759	0.61	233	0.19	125	0.10	153	0.12	539
Cavite	492,328	45.11	310,422	28.45	116,604	10.69	91,052	8.34	52,047	4.77	24,633	2.26	1,469	0.13	1,645	0.15	1,080	0.10	2,650
Cebu	759,938	54.13	67,578	4.81	200,287	14.27	344,783	24.56	17,438	1.24	7,591	0.54	2,529	0.18	1,494	0.11	2,324	0.17	7,888
Cebu City	226,342	60.67	21,188	5.68	48,098	12.89	67,005	17.96	4,662	1.25	3,807	1.02	730	0.20	377	0.10	835	0.22	1,353
Compostela Valley	65,852	26.07	129,403	51.24	28,123	11.14	18,354	7.27	9,436	3.74	608	0.24	348	0.14	204	0.08	229	0.09	1,491
Cotabato	91,322	20.78	269,267	61.27	43,616	9.93	22,046	5.02	10,993	2.50	1,202	0.27	517	0.12	295	0.07	190	0.04	1,570
Davao City	204,713	36.50	253,623	45.22	28,407	5.06	53,407	9.52	14,852	2.65	4,111	0.73	677	0.12	524	0.09	610	0.11	3,822
Davao del Norte	112,801	32.44	173,494	49.89	17,118	4.92	34,052	9.79	8,303	2.39	1,031	0.30	397	0.11	243	0.07	301	0.09	1,464
Davao del Sur	73,664	21.34	169,981	49.24	45,411	13.15	47,904	13.88	5,890	1.71	1,254	0.36	530	0.15	289	0.08	314	0.09	1,629
Davao Oriental	44,233	22.14	88,807	44.44	41,048	20.54	18,482	9.25	6,090	3.05	535	0.27	310	0.16	157	0.08	169	0.08	1,043
Dinagat Islands	9,249	21.21	3,191	7.32	7,024	16.11	22,550	51.71	1,201	2.75	222	0.51	79	0.18	50	0.11	46	0.11	282
Eastern Samar	76,028	39.15	59,261	30.51	35,620	18.34	13,696	7.05	7,134	3.67	1,315	0.68	483	0.25	368	0.19	307	0.16	1,208
Guimaras	21,004	28.85	4,581	6.29	21,065	28.94	24,256	33.32	1,349	1.85	290	0.40	112	0.15	83	0.11	61	0.08	233
Ifugao	28,435	37.57	16,024	21.17	14,024	18.53	6,353	8.39	9,828	12.99	611	0.81	122	0.16	171	0.23	118	0.16	381
Ilocos Norte	32,831	11.46	91,565	31.97	111,814	39.04	38,678	13.50	8,980	3.14	1,786	0.62	265	0.09	343	0.12	162	0.06	698
Ilocos Sur	56,917	18.18	39,655	12.67	147,664	47.17	56,105	17.92	9,533	3.05	2,176	0.70	309	0.10	481	0.15	230	0.07	708
Iloilo	374,038	48.91	45,836	5.99	268,567	35.12	54,100	7.07	13,876	1.81	3,461	0.45	2,989	0.39	964	0.13	912	0.12	4,410
Iloilo City	96,043	50.99	16,652	8.84	41,248	21.90	27,464	14.58	4,245	2.25	1,882	1.00	419	0.22	191	0.10	224	0.12	539
Isabela	175,254	29.05	262,856	43.58	100,332	16.63	41,540	6.89	17,008	2.82	4,244	0.70	706	0.12	662	0.11	612	0.10	3,905
Kalinga	19,608	21.82	31,524	35.08	18,875	21.01	13,848	15.41	4,680	5.21	814	0.91	140	0.16	177	0.20	186	0.21	609
La Union	86,839	24.94	126,602	36.35	87,279	25.06	31,845	9.14	11,003	3.16	3,347	0.96	401	0.12	628	0.18	300	0.09	958
Laguna	442,620	42.97	354,363	34.40	87,869	8.53	70,957	6.89	46,334	4.50	23,823	2.31	1,313	0.13	1,561	0.15	1,139	0.11	2,680
Lanao del Norte	96,413	27.62	125,479	35.95	23,058	6.61	95,344	27.31	6,232	1.79	1,531	0.44	486	0.14	235	0.07	276	0.08	1,455
Lanao del Sur	136,625	48.78	16,808	6.00	89,088	31.80	30,315	10.82	2,982	1.06	3,313	1.18	319	0.11	448	0.16	213	0.08	1,146
Las Piñas	67,404	32.08	26,655	12.69	83,620	39.80	18,677	8.89	6,354	3.02	6,632	3.16	283	0.13	232	0.11	260	0.12	327
Leyte	291,106	40.07	192,740	26.53	139,439	19.19	77,390	10.65	15,535	2.14	6,354	0.87	1,491	0.21	1,282	0.18	1,245	0.17	5,357
Maguindanao	163,377	41.33	52,020	13.16	125,400	31.72	47,082	11.91	4,686	1.19	1,832	0.46	297	0.08	444	0.11	183	0.05	1,441
Makati	125,333	44.95	70,065	25.13	22,957	8.23	40,313	14.46	8,774	3.15	10,073	3.61	494	0.18	382	0.14	415	0.15	607
Malabon	57,510	42.09	48,301	35.35	9,392	6.87	11,772	8.62	4,642	3.40	4,366	3.20	209	0.15	268	0.20	171	0.13	302
Mandaluyong	61,239	45.49	36,964	27.46	9,304	6.91	17,702	13.15	3,996	2.97	4,869	3.62	237	0.18	147	0.11	165	0.12	323
Manila	298,217	43.65	214,517	31.40	52,560	7.69	72,521	10.62	20,022	2.93	22,403	3.28	1,090	0.16	1,029	0.15	812	0.12	1,599
Marikina	75,905	48.21	33,953	21.56	9,170	5.82	15,842	10.06	6,283	3.99	15,579	9.89	249	0.16	250	0.16	224	0.14	393
Marinduque	45,839	45.95	35,967	36.06	8,430	8.45	5,642	5.66	2,601	2.61	837	0.84	177	0.18	113	0.11	142	0.14	596
Masbate	130,800	44.85	62,056	21.28	49,726	17.05	34,570	11.85	10,404	3.57	1,723	0.59	924	0.32	498	0.17	908	0.31	3,173
Misamis Occidental	99,264	40.47	40,811	16.64	56,045	22.85	41,669	16.99	5,735	2.34	855	0.35	394	0.16	192	0.08	331	0.13	1,990
Misamis Oriental	119,471	32.90	157,627	43.40	41,617	11.46	32,938	9.07	8,395	2.31	1,603	0.44	546	0.15	414	0.11	564	0.16	3,866
Mountain Province	20,415	29.44	15,117	21.80	13,258	19.12	11,570	16.68	7,705	11.11	798	1.15	166	0.24	215	0.31	105	0.15	312
Muntinlupa	89,125	47.38	48,446	25.76	20,480	10.89	17,664	9.39	6,617	3.52	5,055	2.69	194	0.10	274	0.15	237	0.13	510
Navotas	24,413	27.42	49,374	55.46	4,779	5.37	5,204	5.85	3,113	3.50	1,839	2.07	92	0.10	125	0.14	80	0.09	153
Negros Occidental	515,480	56.95	90,634	10.01	165,266	18.26	105,573	11.66	19,913	2.20	4,334	0.48	1,131	0.12	1,317	0.15	1,568	0.17	8,474
Negros Oriental	264,388	55.10	30,311	6.32	90,370	18.84	73,081	15.23	15,635	3.26	2,828	0.59	1,479	0.31	691	0.14	1,011	0.21	6,520
Northern Samar	103,015	43.33	65,141	27.40	28,782	12.11	32,263	13.57	6,556	2.76	832	0.35	531	0.22	257	0.11	376	0.16	2,523
Nueva Ecija	295,015	33.56	426,542	48.52	81,714	9.30	41,389	4.71	22,283	2.53	10,195	1.16	721	0.08	698	0.08	554	0.06	2,464
Nueva Vizcaya	49,964	29.45	52,005	30.65	46,494	27.40	10,944	6.45	8,442	4.98	1,288	0.76	189	0.11	179	0.11	167	0.10	586
Occidental Mindoro	50,468	30.74	83,222	50.69	13,700	8.34	10,791	6.57	4,483	2.73	998	0.61	197	0.12	148	0.09	175	0.11	696
Oriental Mindoro	148,884	48.31	95,866	31.11	28,998	9.41	15,109	4.90	16,563	5.37	1,893	0.61	324	0.11	254	0.08	276	0.09	1,448
Palawan	117,749	33.59	129,488	36.93	65,368	18.64	11,795	3.36	21,953	6.26	2,036	0.58	760	0.22	654	0.19	794	0.23	3,150
Pampanga	327,666	36.60	43,298	4.84	194,999	21.78	280,462	31.33	30,947	3.46	15,550	1.74	695	0.08	854	0.10	724	0.08	2,595
Pangasinan	537,533	43.17	223,441	17.94	318,533	25.58	105,157	8.44	42,095	3.38	13,995	1.12	1,020	0.08	2,222	0.18	1,278	0.10	5,477
Parañaque	99,988	49.77	45,230	22.51	16,762	8.34	25,133	12.51	5,723	2.85	7,259	3.61	302	0.15	232	0.12	290	0.14	556
Pasay	78,445	43.47	58,187	32.24	14,457	8.01	18,381	10.18	5,772	3.20	4,569	2.53	253	0.14	226	0.13	182	0.10	465
Pasig	128,189	49.66	63,674	24.67	22,737	8.81	25,011	9.69	8,766	3.40	8,746	3.39	351	0.14	355	0.14	319	0.12	609
Quezon	356,228	46.09	286,208	37.03	57,383	7.42	45,050	5.83	18,779	2.43	6,529	0.84	1,073	0.14	833	0.11	867	0.11	3,354
Quezon City	364,048	47.88	206,435	27.15	42,475	5.59	87,292	11.48	24,728	3.25	31,556	4.15	1,545	0.20	1,048	0.14	1,170	0.15	1,746
Quirino	19,341	25.91	27,162	36.39	17,028	22.82	5,281	7.08	4,915	6.59	630	0.84	121	0.16	92	0.12	63	0.08	282
Rizal	353,531	41.88	303,829	35.99	60,939	7.22	65,652	7.78	31,001	3.67	25,847	3.06	1,178	0.14	1,181	0.14	1,016	0.12	2,027
Romblon	44,369	36.20	27,256	22.24	36,571	29.84	6,537	5.33	6,820	5.56	587	0.48	169	0.14	116	0.09	130	0.11	411
Samar	122,195	39.73	85,985	27.96	71,015	23.09	16,768	5.45	9,005	2.93	1,058	0.34	642	0.21	453	0.15	408	0.13	2,137
San Juan	22,225	38.57	21,341	37.03	2,511	4.36	7,289	12.65	1,736	3.01	2,249	3.90	106	0.18	84	0.15	85	0.15	103
Sarangani	25,882	15.04	91,327	53.08	26,588	15.45	22,161	12.88	5,106	2.97	405	0.24	322	0.19	155	0.09	100	0.06	728
Siquijor	21,521	44.19	4,390	9.01	3,899	8.01	17,618	36.18	839	1.72	213	0.44	110	0.23	45	0.09	67	0.14	243
Sorsogon	132,575	43.04	103,261	33.53	41,670	13.53	19,189	6.23	7,199	2.34	2,442	0.79	443	0.14	703	0.23	514	0.17	2,309
South Cotabato	126,682	27.02	284,494	60.69	24,432	5.21	18,713	3.99	11,360	2.42	1,937	0.41	586	0.13	304	0.06	279	0.06	1,728
Southern Leyte	80,373	42.52	13,862	7.33	27,486	14.54	60,456	31.99	5,038	2.67	1,006	0.53	316	0.17	234	0.12	232	0.12	892
Sultan Kudarat	62,760	26.45	146,042	61.55	18,424	7.77	5,058	2.13	3,984	1.68	439	0.19	264	0.11	139	0.06	149	0.06	661
Sulu	69,378	39.01	10,984	6.18	63,463	35.69	30,892	17.37	1,928	1.08	667	0.38	228	0.13	129	0.07	157	0.09	977
Surigao del Norte	74,813	34.85	31,509	14.68	62,579	29.15	33,259	15.49	10,736	5.00	842	0.39	364	0.17	319	0.15	273	0.13	1,268
Surigao del Sur	94,791	38.86	56,313	23.08	42,205	17.30	36,028	14.77	12,108	4.96	1,106	0.45	676	0.28	336	0.14	383	0.16	1,447
Taguig–Pateros	104,373	47.84	61,735	28.30	20,688	9.48	18,187	8.34	7,971	3.65	4,430	2.03	252	0.12	318	0.15	216	0.10	717
Tarlac	387,624	73.52	30,191	5.73	28,632	5.43	65,139	12.35	12,063	2.29	2,505	0.48	226	0.04	273	0.05	578	0.11	2,401
Tawi-Tawi	46,042	47.41	7,568	7.79	27,285	28.10	13,900	14.31	1,485	1.53	370	0.38	164	0.17	165	0.17	129	0.13	792
Valenzuela	90,203	46.18	53,959	27.62	18,241	9.34	18,300	9.37	7,561	3.87	6,358	3.25	232	0.12	298	0.15	194	0.10	464
Zambales	127,722	40.81	84,451	26.99	26,545	8.48	14,381	4.60	9,137	2.92	49,462	15.81	228	0.07	385	0.12	623	0.20	934
Zamboanga City	75,243	35.97	97,443	46.59	24,375	11.65	6,522	3.12	3,581	1.71	1,381	0.66	297	0.14	151	0.07	174	0.08	666
Zamboanga del Norte	157,320	40.45	74,731	19.21	92,832	23.87	54,445	14.00	6,395	1.64	1,255	0.32	1,026	0.26	450	0.12	481	0.12	2,683
Zamboanga del Sur	158,866	45.95	111,535	32.26	42,406	12.26	22,451	6.49	8,392	2.43	889	0.26	515	0.15	322	0.09	396	0.11	3,425
Zamboanga Sibugay	39,019	17.48	87,126	39.03	74,608	33.42	14,507	6.50	6,617	2.96	440	0.20	413	0.19	155	0.07	338	0.15	1,526
Absentee voters	86,297	51.17	16,307	9.67	18,357	10.88	20,154	11.95	19,721	11.69	7,102	4.21	229	0.14	256	0.15	241	0.14	149
Total	15,208,678	42.08	9,487,837	26.25	5,573,835	15.42	4,095,839	11.33	1,125,878	3.12	501,727	1.39	54,575	0.15	46,489	0.13	44,244	0.12	181,985

== Vice presidential election ==
Candidate	Party	Votes	%
Jejomar Binay (Note: Running mate of Joseph Estrada (Pwersa ng Masang Pilipino))	PDP–Laban	14,645,574	41.65
Mar Roxas	Liberal Party	13,918,490	39.58
Loren Legarda (Note: Running mate of Manny Villar (Nacionalista Party))	Nationalist People's Coalition	4,294,664	12.21
Bayani Fernando	Bagumbayan–VNP	1,017,631	2.89
Edu Manzano	Lakas–Kampi–CMD	807,728	2.30
Perfecto Yasay Jr.	Bangon Pilipinas	364,652	1.04
Jay Sonza (Note: Running mate of Vetellano Acosta (Kilusang Bagong Lipunan) who was disqualified)	Kilusang Bagong Lipunan	64,230	0.18
Dominador Chipeco Jr.	Ang Kapatiran	52,562	0.15
Total		35,165,531	100.00
Valid votes		35,165,531	92.18
Invalid/blank votes		2,983,840	7.82
Total votes		38,149,371	–
Registered voters/turnout		51,317,073	74.34
Source: COMELEC

Province/City	Binay		Roxas		Legarda		Fernando		Manzano		Yasay		Sonza		Chipeco	
Province/City	Votes	%	Votes	%	Votes	%	Votes	%	Votes	%	Votes	%	Votes	%	Votes	%
Abra	52,823	50.31	18,756	17.86	26,512	25.25	1,996	1.90	4,090	3.90	538	0.51	124	0.12	157	0.15
Agusan del Norte	84,539	32.22	122,638	46.74	24,294	9.26	4,414	1.68	21,204	8.08	4,381	1.67	409	0.16	508	0.19
Agusan del Sur	80,633	35.13	90,827	39.58	22,199	9.67	3,494	1.52	27,317	11.90	4,224	1.84	346	0.15	463	0.20
Aklan	52,466	23.24	133,545	59.16	22,061	9.77	13,103	5.80	1,780	0.79	2,149	0.95	347	0.15	285	0.13
Albay	222,543	41.62	244,286	45.69	41,062	7.68	12,697	2.37	8,510	1.59	3,384	0.63	982	0.18	1,176	0.22
Antique	46,213	22.78	87,893	43.32	57,893	28.53	4,241	2.09	3,600	1.77	2,165	1.07	418	0.21	469	0.23
Apayao	18,665	43.70	6,181	14.47	15,918	37.27	979	2.29	606	1.42	231	0.54	63	0.15	67	0.16
Aurora	35,247	43.24	20,924	25.67	20,917	25.66	2,338	2.87	761	0.93	1,128	1.38	109	0.13	85	0.10
Bacolod	44,505	22.59	135,742	68.89	7,461	3.79	4,876	2.47	2,250	1.14	1,798	0.91	217	0.11	203	0.10
Baguio	39,431	37.13	47,679	44.90	8,773	8.26	6,216	5.85	1,345	1.27	2,418	2.28	260	0.24	73	0.07
Basilan	63,642	49.78	29,909	23.39	28,316	22.15	1,820	1.42	3,605	2.82	220	0.17	100	0.08	246	0.19
Bataan	170,477	48.82	109,705	31.42	51,044	14.62	9,582	2.74	3,576	1.02	3,844	1.10	642	0.18	296	0.08
Batanes	1,094	14.24	4,497	58.54	1,269	16.52	143	1.86	595	7.75	52	0.68	21	0.27	11	0.14
Batangas	558,748	54.12	383,170	37.12	56,780	5.50	14,481	1.40	9,033	0.87	8,367	0.81	1,003	0.10	772	0.07
Benguet	34,207	23.38	68,149	46.58	31,755	21.71	5,476	3.74	3,077	2.10	3,191	2.18	272	0.19	167	0.11
Biliran	33,907	50.91	18,174	27.29	8,864	13.31	1,028	1.54	3,570	5.36	804	1.21	136	0.20	118	0.18
Bohol	185,504	34.21	261,592	48.24	63,507	11.71	8,124	1.50	16,089	2.97	5,298	0.98	901	0.17	1,277	0.24
Bukidnon	170,290	35.52	198,318	41.36	84,462	17.62	8,479	1.77	9,968	2.08	5,203	1.09	1,528	0.32	1,237	0.26
Bulacan	559,241	49.87	408,011	36.39	81,939	7.31	44,471	3.97	8,258	0.74	16,544	1.48	2,082	0.19	789	0.07
Cagayan	222,701	51.57	115,931	26.84	76,514	17.72	8,277	1.92	5,221	1.21	2,016	0.47	535	0.12	679	0.16
Cagayan de Oro	115,938	56.39	70,116	34.11	9,601	4.67	4,551	2.21	1,918	0.93	2,962	1.44	343	0.17	156	0.08
Caloocan	226,580	53.26	151,750	35.67	19,182	4.51	18,203	4.28	3,260	0.77	5,469	1.29	779	0.18	214	0.05
Camarines Norte	86,670	43.58	77,273	38.85	25,182	12.66	4,498	2.26	2,516	1.27	2,223	1.12	229	0.12	302	0.15
Camarines Sur	232,976	35.53	271,672	41.44	109,373	16.68	13,677	2.09	20,492	3.13	5,028	0.77	1,083	0.17	1,327	0.20
Camiguin	5,147	11.84	9,674	22.26	2,150	4.95	222	0.51	25,993	59.82	204	0.47	22	0.05	41	0.09
Capiz	88,313	27.38	204,839	63.50	14,537	4.51	2,630	0.82	10,151	3.15	1,423	0.44	261	0.08	446	0.14
Catanduanes	65,176	55.41	32,318	27.48	13,725	11.67	3,400	2.89	1,456	1.24	1,044	0.89	297	0.25	207	0.18
Cavite	579,728	53.45	385,695	35.56	61,832	5.70	30,595	2.82	7,233	0.67	16,945	1.56	1,865	0.17	766	0.07
Cebu	323,171	23.97	814,397	60.40	123,200	9.14	19,198	1.42	55,189	4.09	8,400	0.62	2,430	0.18	2,389	0.18
Cebu City	91,246	24.58	240,311	64.73	21,994	5.92	8,144	2.19	5,349	1.44	3,151	0.85	552	0.15	514	0.14
Compostela Valley	118,525	48.70	83,792	34.43	27,960	11.49	4,636	1.91	4,763	1.96	2,934	1.21	339	0.14	406	0.17
Cotabato	223,041	51.94	122,963	28.63	55,816	13.00	6,904	1.61	16,385	3.82	3,346	0.78	423	0.10	548	0.13
Davao City	278,491	49.72	232,465	41.51	25,112	4.48	10,058	1.80	5,133	0.92	7,135	1.27	1,014	0.18	672	0.12
Davao del Norte	185,082	54.03	124,890	36.46	20,546	6.00	4,153	1.21	3,913	1.14	3,212	0.94	372	0.11	395	0.12
Davao del Sur	180,599	54.57	78,661	23.77	47,934	14.48	5,655	1.71	14,602	4.41	2,133	0.64	741	0.22	630	0.19
Davao Oriental	83,261	44.03	56,397	29.82	34,585	18.29	4,389	2.32	7,357	3.89	2,432	1.29	344	0.18	342	0.18
Dinagat Islands	5,982	14.39	10,320	24.82	5,507	13.24	1,746	4.20	17,515	42.12	399	0.96	54	0.13	59	0.14
Eastern Samar	73,711	40.47	60,029	32.96	35,593	19.54	5,061	2.78	4,592	2.52	2,282	1.25	421	0.23	428	0.24
Guimaras	8,274	12.01	48,300	70.12	7,735	11.23	716	1.04	3,130	4.54	552	0.80	82	0.12	93	0.14
Ifugao	20,843	28.52	29,312	40.10	16,807	22.99	1,920	2.63	1,262	1.73	2,693	3.68	117	0.16	137	0.19
Ilocos Norte	120,853	43.60	49,665	17.92	96,070	34.66	6,035	2.18	2,484	0.90	1,592	0.57	283	0.10	222	0.08
Ilocos Sur	95,318	31.78	96,750	32.26	94,141	31.39	6,834	2.28	4,313	1.44	1,892	0.63	435	0.15	226	0.08
Iloilo	111,219	14.95	503,959	67.72	99,416	13.36	9,008	1.21	11,888	1.60	5,075	0.68	2,378	0.32	1,219	0.16
Iloilo City	38,128	20.50	123,108	66.18	11,354	6.10	5,717	3.07	5,098	2.74	2,286	1.23	226	0.12	114	0.06
Isabela	362,925	61.24	143,561	24.22	68,660	11.59	8,792	1.48	3,903	0.66	3,162	0.53	607	0.10	1,032	0.17
Kalinga	44,402	51.45	20,800	24.10	15,556	18.03	2,434	2.82	1,701	1.97	1,130	1.31	122	0.14	157	0.18
La Union	155,160	45.22	94,885	27.65	79,821	23.26	6,720	1.96	3,327	0.97	2,526	0.74	374	0.11	293	0.09
Laguna	560,978	54.93	328,130	32.13	73,694	7.22	31,184	3.05	7,051	0.69	14,749	1.44	1,752	0.17	3,775	0.37
Lanao del Norte	134,004	39.72	96,923	28.73	93,266	27.65	5,652	1.68	4,087	1.21	2,780	0.82	328	0.10	308	0.09
Lanao del Sur	144,203	54.64	29,074	11.02	82,512	31.27	2,785	1.06	3,990	1.51	740	0.28	316	0.12	287	0.11
Las Piñas	93,958	44.88	73,243	34.99	23,717	11.33	12,849	6.14	1,905	0.91	2,953	1.41	572	0.27	144	0.07
Leyte	316,433	46.95	251,792	37.36	64,935	9.64	12,285	1.82	19,951	2.96	5,856	0.87	981	0.15	1,709	0.25
Maguindanao	181,286	47.57	45,463	11.93	137,752	36.15	3,447	0.90	11,081	2.91	1,274	0.33	373	0.10	424	0.11
Makati	179,375	64.30	74,897	26.85	7,504	2.69	11,137	3.99	2,566	0.92	2,638	0.95	703	0.25	154	0.06
Malabon	72,592	53.48	43,827	32.29	9,523	7.02	6,736	4.96	1,059	0.78	1,614	1.19	308	0.23	86	0.06
Mandaluyong	69,924	52.02	48,339	35.96	4,912	3.65	7,955	5.92	1,251	0.93	1,613	1.20	330	0.25	101	0.08
Manila	375,813	55.09	226,804	33.25	30,428	4.46	32,736	4.80	6,580	0.96	7,594	1.11	1,684	0.25	490	0.07
Marikina	45,696	29.03	58,019	36.86	4,653	2.96	46,182	29.34	827	0.53	1,633	1.04	305	0.19	73	0.05
Marinduque	37,133	38.29	39,141	40.36	14,121	14.56	3,771	3.89	1,717	1.77	831	0.86	155	0.16	116	0.12
Masbate	86,930	33.20	106,062	40.51	43,981	16.80	9,190	3.51	10,560	4.03	3,303	1.26	695	0.27	1,089	0.42
Misamis Occidental	53,496	23.58	97,944	43.18	45,857	20.22	3,018	1.33	23,831	10.51	1,942	0.86	324	0.14	411	0.18
Misamis Oriental	164,548	47.63	120,442	34.86	39,325	11.38	6,460	1.87	9,949	2.88	3,530	1.02	483	0.14	757	0.22
Mountain Province	19,788	30.32	21,053	32.26	18,398	28.19	2,073	3.18	1,672	2.56	2,069	3.17	123	0.19	94	0.14
Muntinlupa	95,085	50.77	70,626	37.71	8,540	4.56	8,986	4.80	1,332	0.71	2,266	1.21	346	0.18	116	0.06
Navotas	56,144	63.67	21,907	24.85	5,026	5.70	3,051	3.46	560	0.64	1,275	1.45	157	0.18	54	0.06
Negros Occidental	177,063	20.28	571,155	65.43	85,038	9.74	12,066	1.38	16,578	1.90	7,121	0.82	1,535	0.18	2,345	0.27
Negros Oriental	96,759	21.59	257,234	57.41	54,787	12.23	9,152	2.04	20,994	4.69	6,085	1.36	1,361	0.30	1,708	0.38
Northern Samar	67,750	31.08	88,980	40.81	38,340	17.59	3,999	1.83	15,642	7.17	2,296	1.05	354	0.16	659	0.30
Nueva Ecija	471,431	54.64	265,321	30.75	95,241	11.04	17,243	2.00	5,917	0.69	6,006	0.70	996	0.12	618	0.07
Nueva Vizcaya	63,653	38.00	53,821	32.13	41,571	24.82	3,779	2.26	1,620	0.97	2,630	1.57	226	0.13	195	0.12
Occidental Mindoro	81,059	50.63	48,107	30.05	20,681	12.92	3,279	2.05	5,655	3.53	994	0.62	172	0.11	141	0.09
Oriental Mindoro	116,401	38.60	138,464	45.92	32,645	10.83	4,893	1.62	3,456	1.15	4,946	1.64	418	0.14	336	0.11
Palawan	107,677	31.72	99,882	29.42	107,389	31.63	12,023	3.54	6,946	2.05	4,121	1.21	683	0.20	775	0.23
Pampanga	220,357	25.18	413,016	47.20	129,569	14.81	66,040	7.55	29,951	3.42	11,105	1.27	4,291	0.49	688	0.08
Pangasinan	441,055	35.82	517,563	42.04	215,789	17.53	30,333	2.46	13,226	1.07	10,434	0.85	1,506	0.12	1,342	0.11
Parañaque	93,564	46.74	80,789	40.36	8,451	4.22	12,243	6.12	2,152	1.08	2,387	1.19	421	0.21	163	0.08
Pasay	112,696	62.60	51,576	28.65	5,842	3.24	6,022	3.34	1,309	0.73	2,115	1.17	363	0.20	115	0.06
Pasig	123,935	48.10	100,239	38.90	10,271	3.99	17,101	6.64	2,034	0.79	3,278	1.27	621	0.24	177	0.07
Quezon	334,582	44.31	300,293	39.77	86,236	11.42	15,452	2.05	9,831	1.30	5,950	0.79	2,079	0.28	621	0.08
Quezon City	363,841	47.92	302,618	39.86	25,275	3.33	49,130	6.47	6,717	0.88	9,300	1.22	1,694	0.22	700	0.09
Quirino	32,986	45.04	19,208	26.23	17,319	23.65	1,866	2.55	797	1.09	849	1.16	82	0.11	125	0.17
Rizal	421,915	50.27	289,043	34.44	50,441	6.01	60,063	7.16	6,162	0.73	9,342	1.11	1,718	0.20	614	0.07
Romblon	33,068	28.81	43,756	38.12	30,297	26.40	4,215	3.67	1,363	1.19	1,822	1.59	136	0.12	113	0.10
Samar	115,887	41.15	96,212	34.16	54,408	19.32	5,094	1.81	5,755	2.04	2,988	1.06	747	0.27	524	0.19
San Juan	29,311	50.92	20,649	35.87	1,570	2.73	4,380	7.61	646	1.12	767	1.33	166	0.29	72	0.13
Sarangani	66,789	41.83	39,184	24.54	34,384	21.53	3,617	2.27	13,561	8.49	1,507	0.94	297	0.19	330	0.21
Siquijor	7,843	17.27	21,631	47.63	3,362	7.40	599	1.32	11,541	25.41	322	0.71	39	0.09	78	0.17
Sorsogon	174,865	58.38	80,388	26.84	29,418	9.82	7,615	2.54	4,151	1.39	1,869	0.62	501	0.17	701	0.23
South Cotabato	210,132	45.25	194,508	41.89	40,288	8.68	9,633	2.07	5,272	1.14	3,559	0.77	529	0.11	453	0.10
Southern Leyte	47,672	27.03	76,056	43.13	15,983	9.06	2,561	1.45	31,230	17.71	2,111	1.20	284	0.16	441	0.25
Sultan Kudarat	111,762	48.29	52,001	22.47	60,164	25.99	3,211	1.39	2,481	1.07	1,328	0.57	284	0.12	222	0.10
Sulu	59,559	37.25	35,101	21.96	50,905	31.84	3,101	1.94	10,188	6.37	400	0.25	286	0.18	329	0.21
Surigao del Norte	60,251	30.11	73,883	36.93	44,474	22.23	4,719	2.36	12,214	6.10	3,805	1.90	351	0.18	387	0.19
Surigao del Sur	75,373	32.48	92,096	39.68	39,209	16.89	5,150	2.22	15,479	6.67	3,683	1.59	555	0.24	532	0.23
Taguig–Pateros	120,046	55.10	75,200	34.52	10,065	4.62	7,910	3.63	1,316	0.60	2,843	1.30	392	0.18	94	0.04
Tarlac	129,523	24.83	317,843	60.94	51,119	9.80	9,282	1.78	8,138	1.56	4,211	0.81	912	0.17	534	0.10
Tawi-Tawi	25,619	28.08	30,725	33.67	29,328	32.14	2,790	3.06	2,181	2.39	232	0.25	175	0.19	202	0.22
Valenzuela	92,246	47.30	75,709	38.82	13,020	6.68	9,398	4.82	1,725	0.88	2,439	1.25	369	0.19	107	0.05
Zambales	116,197	37.60	131,859	42.66	34,180	11.06	20,089	6.50	3,065	0.99	2,745	0.89	553	0.18	369	0.12
Zamboanga City	95,344	45.72	85,715	41.10	20,932	10.04	2,953	1.42	1,917	0.92	1,181	0.57	233	0.11	259	0.12
Zamboanga del Norte	144,808	40.20	158,568	44.02	33,412	9.28	5,945	1.65	13,746	3.82	2,080	0.58	761	0.21	880	0.24
Zamboanga del Sur	171,806	54.60	92,107	29.27	35,611	11.32	4,432	1.41	6,771	2.15	2,334	0.74	374	0.12	1,217	0.39
Zamboanga Sibugay	114,204	54.04	42,039	19.89	35,090	16.60	3,981	1.88	13,352	6.32	1,765	0.84	358	0.17	549	0.26
Absentee voters	31,524	18.78	88,436	52.68	19,487	11.61	10,644	6.34	3,302	1.97	13,457	8.02	785	0.47	246	0.15
Total	14,645,574	41.65	13,918,490	39.58	4,294,664	12.21	1,017,631	2.89	807,728	2.30	364,652	1.04	64,230	0.18	52,562	0.15
