= Pulse Asia =

Polling survey company in the Philippines

Pulse Asia Research Inc.
- Company type: Nonprofit organization
- Industry: Opinion polling
- Founded: 1999
- Founder: Felipe B. Miranda
- Headquarters: Quezon City, Philippines
- Area served: Philippines
- Website: pulseasia.ph

Pulse Asia Research Inc. is a public opinion polling body in the Philippines. It was founded by professor emeritus Felipe B. Miranda (M.A. Political Science, University of Chicago) of the University of the Philippines Diliman.

Pulse Asia Inc. was founded in 1999 as a for-profit private company. In 2013, the company re-formed into a nonprofit organization and changed their name to Pulse Asia Research Inc.

== Ownership dispute ==
Starting in late 2009, Pulse Asia was accused of publishing biased or inaccurate polling, and of having close ties with Benigno Aquino III, who was elected President of the Philippines in June 2010. SEC documents and a research paper indicated that Rafael Cojuangco Lopa and Antonio "Tonyboy" Cojuangco, blood relatives of Aquino, were involved in the establishment of Pulse Asia as well as Social Weather Stations, another polling group. Senatorial candidate Francisco "Kit" Tatad claimed Aquino was using these connections to his advantage, stating, "This suggests that there was a plan from the beginning by the Aquinos to control public opinion polling in the country."

In October 2013, Pulse Asia issued a press release responding to these allegations. They stated that Cojuangco and Lopa were involved in establishing Pulse Asia in 1999, but were never involved in the research work of the organization, and no longer have shares in the company.

== Survey firms as "state propaganda tools" ==
Political survey firms in the Philippines have invariably been accused of being politically biased, especially by politicians, when these surveys deliver results unfavorable to their side.

In 2000, co-founder Professor Emeritus Miranda did admit that a presidential adviser for the current administration had paid over 620,000 pesos to conduct an opinion survey of President Joseph Estrada at the time of his impeachment trial. The survey reflected President Estrada's public acceptance rating going up.

In 2010, Sen. Richard Gordon sued Pulse Asia and Social Weather Stations, the other leading political polling firm, in connection with his poor showing in pre-election surveys in which he was listed as a candidate for president. Gordon explained that "surveys serve no public purpose except to rob the people of their right to be able to engage in a mental exercise where they can gauge their candidate's capability. It is mental conditioning in no uncertain terms." In the event, the court refused to issue the temporary restraining order requested by Gordon. During the actual presidential elections, Gordon received 1.39% of the vote, even less than the 2% the pre-election surveys had indicated.

Since 2016, Pulse Asia was also tagged as a "propaganda tool" by several anti-Duterte organizations and newspaper columnists due to its regular release of surveys that seemed to improve the optics of the Duterte government amid on-going crises and social unrest resulting from corruption scandals and gross ineptitude.. Despite the controversy, however, Pulse Asia has regularly delivered its Ulat ng Bayan surveys, even if these showed high approval and trust ratings for Duterte among Filipinos. Various hypotheses have been advanced to explain the continuing high ratings of Duterte in such surveys, including the element of apprehension or fear among respondents.

== See also ==
- Politics of the Philippines
- Social Weather Stations
