= Social Weather Stations =

Filipino public opinion company

- Type: private, independent, non-partisan, non-profit scientific
- Industry: Research
- Genre: public opinion polling
- Founded: 1985
- Founder: Mahar Mangahas; Felipe B. Miranda; Mercedes R. Abad; Jose P. de Jesus; Ma. Alcestis Abrera Mangahas; Gémino Abad; Rosa Linda Tidalgo-Miranda
- Headquarters: 52 Malingap Street, Sikatuna Village, Quezon City, Philippines
- Area served: Philippines
- Key people: Mahar Mangahas; Linda Luz B. Guerrero; Ricardo Abad; Ruperto P. Alonzo; Virginia A. Teodosio; Ned Roberto; Jasmin Acuña
- Products: survey data, public opinion
- Revenue: subscriptions
- Website: sws.org.ph

Social Weather Stations, abbreviated as SWS, is a private, non-stock, nonprofit social research institution in the Philippines founded on August 8, 1985. It is the foremost public-opinion polling body in the Philippines.

== The institution ==
As an independent institution, the SWS formally registered with the Philippine Securities and Exchange Commission on August 8, 1985. Its mission is to regularly do scientific social surveys for the sake of education (so eyes may see social conditions), conscientization (so hearts may feel social problems); and analysis (so minds may understand their solutions). Its basic functions include: social analysis and research, with stress on social indicators and the development of new data sources; design and implementation of social, economic, and political surveys, including public opinion polls; and the dissemination of research findings through publications, seminars, briefings, and other channels.

=== Founding Fellows ===
1. Dr. Mahar Mangahas (currently the president and CEO)
2. Prof. Felipe B. Miranda
3. Mercedes R. Abad
4. Jose P. de Jesus
5. Ma. Alcestis Abrera-Mangahas
6. Gemino H. Abad
7. Rosa Linda Tidalgo-Miranda

=== Social Weather Indicators ===
- Statistic Database
- Change in quality of life
- Expected change in quality of life
- Expected change in the economy
- Satisfaction with the president

== See also ==
- ASEAN
- Economy of the Philippines
