= Leyte Provincial Board =

Legislative body of the province of Leyte, Philippines

Leyte Provincial Board: Sangguniang Panlalawigan han Leyte (Waray); Sangguniang Panlalawigan sa Leyte (Cebuano); Sangguniang Panlalawigan ng Leyte (Filipino)
- 11th Leyte Provincial Board

Type
- Type: Unicameral
- Term limits: 3 terms (9 years)

Leadership
- Presiding Officer: Leonardo M. Javier Jr., NPC since 30 June 2022
- Majority Floor Leader: Atty. Carlo P. Loreto, NPC since 17 July 2025
- 1st Deputy Floor Leader: Ronnan Christian M. Reposar, Liberal since 17 July 2025
- 2nd Deputy Floor Leader: Raissa J. Villasin, NPC since 17 July 2025

Structure
- Seats: 13 board members 1 ex officio presiding officer
- Political groups: NPC (4) Liberal (1) NUP (4) PFP (1) KANP (1) Nonpartisan (2)
- Committees: See Committees
- Length of term: 3 years
- Authority: Local Government Code of the Philippines

Elections
- Voting system: Multiple non-transferable vote (regular members); Indirect election (ex officio members)
- Last election: May 12, 2025
- Next election: May 8, 2028

Meeting place
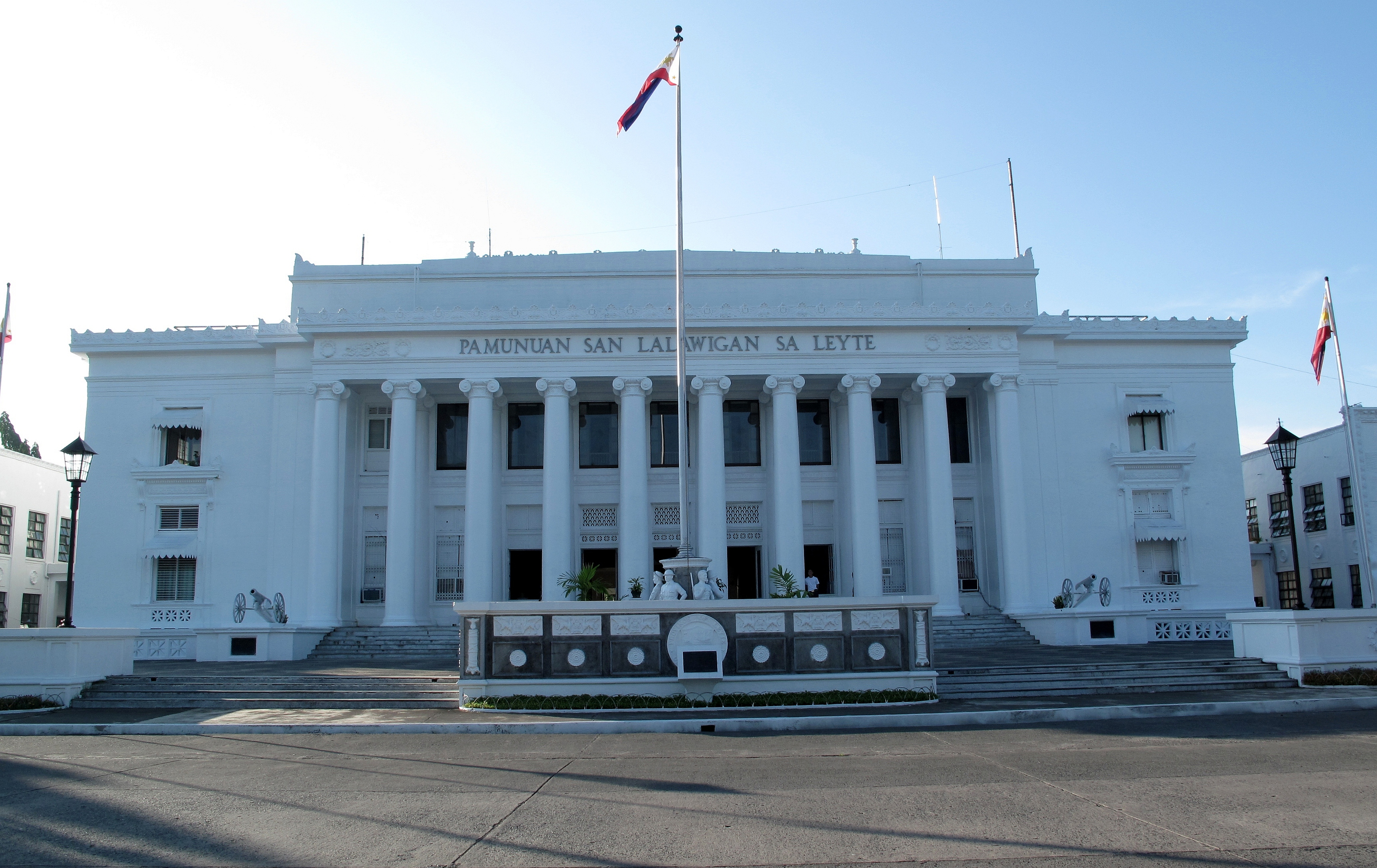
- Session Hall, Legislative Building; Leyte Provincial Capitol; Tacloban City, Philippines

The Leyte Provincial Board (Waray: Sangguniang Panlalawigan han Leyte, Cebuano: Sangguniang Panlalawigan sa Leyte) is the Sangguniang Panlalawigan (provincial legislature) of the Philippine province of Leyte.

The members are elected via plurality-at-large voting: the province is divided into five legislative districts, each sending two members to the provincial board; the electorate votes for two members, with the two candidates with the highest number of votes being elected.

The districts used in appropriation of members is coextensive with the legislative districts of Leyte.

== District apportionment ==
Election Year	No. of seats per district					Ex officio seats	Total seats
Election Year	1st	2nd	3rd	4th	5th	Ex officio seats	Total seats
2004–2010	2	2	2	2	2	3	13
2013–2016	2	2	2	2	2	2	12
2019–2022	2	2	2	2	2	3	13
2022-2025	2	2	2	2	2	3	13
2025-Present	2	2	2	2	2	3	13

== 12th Sangguniang Panlalawigan (2025-Present) ==
- Vice Governor: Leonardo M. Javier Jr. (NPC) - Presiding Officer

Seat	Board member	Party	Start of term	End of term	Origin
1st district	Wilson S. Uy	NPC	June 30, 2022	June 30, 2028	Palo
1st district	Ronnan Christian M. Resposar	Liberal	June 30, 2022	June 30, 2028	Palo
2nd district	Raissa J. Villasin	NPC	June 30, 2019	June 30, 2028	Barugo
2nd district	Mildred Joy P. Que	PFP	June 30, 2025	June 30, 2028	Dulag
3rd district	Marie Kathryn V. Kabigting	NUP	June 30, 2022	June 30, 2028	Villaba
3rd district	Alan P. Ang	NUP	June 30, 2025	June 30, 2028	San Isidro
4th district	Flaviano C. Centino Jr.	NUP	June 30, 2022	June 30, 2028	Isabel
4th district	Elmer Frederico N. Codilla	NUP	June 30, 2025	June 30, 2028	Kananga
5th district	Michael L. Cari	NPC	June 30, 2022	June 30, 2028	Baybay City
5th district	Carlo P. Loreto	NPC	June 30, 2022	June 30, 2028	Baybay City
ABC	Ma. Martina L. Gimenez	Nonpartisan	January 16, 2024	December 31, 2025	Tanauan
PCL	Chiqui Ruth C. Uy	KANP	September 11, 2026	June 30, 2028	Palo
SK	MJ Luinly D. Lumen	Nonpartisan		December 31, 2025	Mayorga

=== Ex officio Board Members ===
Name	Provincial Federation
Ma. Martina L. Gimenez (Tanauan)	League of Barangays of the Philippines
Chiqui Ruth C. Uy (Palo)	Philippine Councilors' League
MJ Luinly D. Lumen (Mayorga)	Sangguniang Kabataan

== List of members ==
An additional three ex officio members are the presidents of the provincial chapters of the Association of Barangay Captains, the Councilors' League, the Sangguniang Kabataan provincial president; the municipal and city (if applicable) presidents of the Association of Barangay Captains, Councilors' League and Sangguniang Kabataan, shall elect amongst themselves their provincial presidents which shall be their representatives at the board.

However, with the recent controversy regarding the role of the Sangguniang Kabataan and the proposed amendments to the Local Government Code, specifically the Sangguniang Kabataan provisions, the Sangguniang Kabataan provincial chapter president did not serve as an ex officio member of the Provincial Board until 2019.

After the 2018 Barangay and Sangguniang Kabataan elections, the SK provincial chapter president has been seated as an ex officio member of the Provincial Board since 2019.

=== Vice Governor ===
Election year	Name	Party
1998	Trinidad Apostol	Lakas
2001	Nestor Villasin	Lakas
2004	Ma. Mimietta Bagulaya	NPC
2007	Ma. Mimietta Bagulaya	Liberal
2010	Ma. Mimietta Bagulaya	Liberal
2010	Florante Cayunda, Jr.^{1}	Lakas–Kampi
2013	Carlo Loreto	Liberal
2016	Carlo Loreto	Liberal
2019	Carlo Loreto	PDP–Laban
2022	Leonardo M. Javier Jr.	PDP–Laban
2025	Leonardo M. Javier Jr.	NPC

^1Cayunda succeeded Bagulaya as Vice-Governor in November 2012 after Bagulaya succeeded Jericho Petilla as Governor, who in turn vacated his gubernatorial post after being appointed Energy Secretary.

=== 1st District (excludes Tacloban City) ===
- City: None
- Municipalities: Alangalang, Babatngon, Palo, San Miguel, Santa Fe, Tanauan, Tolosa
- Population (2015): 268,942

Election year	Member (party)	Member (party)
2004	Evangeline Esperas (NPC)	Ma. Lourdes Go-Soco (Liberal)
2007	Ma. Lourdes Go-Soco (Lakas-CMD)	Evangeline Esperas (Lakas-CMD)
2010	Roque Tiu (Liberal)	Ma. Lourdes Go-Soco (Lakas-Kampi)
2013	Gina Merilo (Liberal)	Ranulfo Abellanosa (Liberal)
2016	Gina Merilo (Liberal)	Ranulfo Abellanosa (Liberal)
2019	Gina Merilo (PDP–Laban)	Ranulfo Abellanosa (PDP–Laban)
2022	Ronnan Christian Reposar (Liberal)	Wilson Uy (PDP–Laban)
2025	Wilson Uy (NPC)	Ronnan Christian Reposar (Liberal)

=== 2nd District ===
- Cities: none
- Municipalities: Barugo, Burauen, Capoocan, Carigara, Dagami, Dulag, Jaro, Julita, La Paz, Macarthur, Mayorga, Pastrana, Tabontabon, Tunga
- Population (2015): 406,359

Election year	Member (party)	Member (party)
2004	Lesmes Lumen (NPC)	Simeon Ongbit, Jr. (NPC)
2007	Lesmes Lumen (Lakas-CMD)	Simeon Ongbit, Jr. (Lakas-CMD)
2010	Anlie Apostol (Lakas-Kampi)	Niccolo Villasin (Lakas-Kampi)
2013	Anlie Apostol (Liberal)	Niccolo Villasin (Liberal)
2016	Trinidad Apostol (Liberal)	Niccolo Villasin (Liberal)
2019	Trinidad Apostol (PFP)	Raissa Villasin (PFP)
2022	Trinidad Apostol (PDP-Laban)	Raissa Villasin (PDP-Laban)
2025	Raissa Villasin (NPC)	Mildred Joy P. Que (PFP)

=== 3rd District ===
- Cities: none
- Municipalities: Calubian, Leyte, San Isidro, Tabango, Villaba
- Population (2015): 179,594

Election year	Member (party)	Member (party)
2004	Rowil Batan (NPC)	Rolando Piamonte, Sr. (LDP)
2007	Rowil Batan (LDP)	Rolando Piamonte, Sr. (Lakas-CMD)
2010	Bernard Jonathan Remandaban (Lakas-Kampi)	Rolando Piamonte, Sr. (Lakas-Kampi)
2013	Alan Ang (Liberal)	Ma. Mimietta Bagulaya (Liberal)
2016	Alan Ang (NUP)	Ma. Corazon E. Remandaban (Liberal)
2019	Anna Veloso-Tuazon (NUP)	Ma. Corazon E. Remandaban (NPC)
2022	Marie Kathryn V. Kabigting (NUP)	Ma. Corazon E. Remandaban (PDP-Laban)
2025	Marie Kathryn V. Kabigting (NUP)	Alan P. Ang (NUP)

=== 4th District (excludes Ormoc City) ===
- Cities: none
- Municipalities: Albuera, Isabel, Kananga, Matag-ob, Mérida, Palompon
- Population (2015): 256,166

Election year	Member (party)	Member (party)
2004	Herville Pajaron (Liberal)	Antonio Jabilles (NPC)
2007	Antonio Jabilles (Lakas-CMD)	Deborah Bertulfo (Lakas-CMD)
2010	Deborah Bertulfo (Lakas-Kampi)	Antonio Jabilles (Lakas-Kampi)
2013	Deborah Bertulfo (Liberal)	Mesias Arevalo (Liberal)
2016	Manuel Vicente Torres (Liberal)	Mesias Arevalo (Liberal)
2019	Carmen Torres-Rama (PDP–Laban)	Mesias Arevalo (PDP–Laban)
2022	Flaviano C. Centino (PDP–Laban)	Vincent L. Rama (PDP–Laban)
2025	Flaviano C. Centino (NUP)	Elmer Frederico N. Codilla (NUP)

=== 5th District ===
- Cities: Baybay
- Municipalities: Abuyog, Bato, Hilongos, Hindang, Inopacan, Javier, Mahaplag, Matalom
- Population (2015): 398,587

Election year	Member (party)	Member (party)
2004	Carlo Loreto (NPC)	Emmanuel Golo (NPC)
2007	Carlo Loreto (Lakas-CMD)	Florante Cayunda, Sr. (Liberal)
2010	Florante Cayunda, Jr. (Lakas-Kampi)	Carlo Loreto (Lakas-Kampi)
2010	vacant^{1}	Carlo Loreto (Lakas-Kampi)
2013	Florante Cayunda, Jr. (Liberal)	Emmanuel Gacis (Liberal)
2016	Florante Cayunda, Jr. (Liberal)	Emmanuel Gacis (Liberal)
2019	Florante Cayunda, Jr. (PFP)	Emmanuel Gacis (PFP)
2022	Michael L. Cari (PDP-Laban)	Carlo P. Loreto (PDP-Laban)
2025	Michael L. Cari (NPC)	Carlo P. Loreto (NPC)

^1Cayunda vacated the post after being appointed Vice Governor in November 2012.

=== Ex officio members ===
==== Philippine Councilors' League Provincial Federation ====
Election year	Name
2004	Wilson Uy^{1}
2007	Wilson Uy^{1}
2010	Wilson Uy^{2}
2013	Wilson Uy^{2}
2016	Wilson Uy^{2}
2019	Edwin Faller^{3}
2019	Chiqui Ruth Uy
2025	Carmen L. Cari^{4}
2025	Chiqui Ruth C. Uy

^1 Served in his capacity as councilor from Tacloban City.
^2 Served in his capacity as councilor from Palo, Leyte.
^3 Faller was temporarily seated in his capacity as the Vice-President of the Philippine Councilors' League Provincial Federation until the election of the League President.
^4 Dead in Office

==== League of Barangays of the Philippines Provincial Federation ====
Election year	Name
2004	Enrico Albao
2007	Enrico Albao
2010	Margarita Cari
2013	Margarita Cari^{1}
2013	Edwin Faller
2013	Nolie Caña^{2}
2018	Nolie Caña
2023	Ma. Martina L. Gimenez

^1Died in office, October 12, 2014.
^2Replaced Faller as LnBP Provincial President when Faller became a Sangguniang Bayan Member for Hilongos, Leyte in 2016.

==== Sangguniang Kabataan Provincial Federation ====
Election year	Name
2004	Gretchen Nirza
2007	Brent Gerard Daya
2010	Kim Roger Serdoncillo
2018	Jo Vanille Chua
2023	MJ Luinly D. Lumen

== Committees ==
Committee	Chair
Blue Ribbon	Mildred Joy P. Que
Agriculture	Carlo P. Loreto
Appointments	Carmen L. Cari
Banking and Financial Institutions	Wilson S. Uy
Barangay Affairs and Community Development	Ma. Martina L. Gimenez
Boundary Disputes	Ronnan Christian M. Reposar
Budget Management and Appropriations	Wilson S. Uy
Cooperatives and Accreditations	Ronnan Christian M. Reposar
Disaster Risk Reduction and Management	Carlo P. Loreto
Education	Carlo P. Loreto
Energy, Science and Technology	Elmer Frederico N. Codilla
Environment and Natural Resources	Leonardo M. Javier Jr.
Federalism Reforms and Governance	Mildred Joy P. Que
Finance and Economic Enterprise Development	TBD
Games and Amusement	Michael L. Cari
Health and Sanitation	Raissa J. Villasin
Heritage, Culture and the Arts	Raissa J. Villasin
Housing, Land Use and Informal Settlers	Ronnan Christian M. Reposar
Human Rights and Justice	Mildred Joy P. Que
Information and Communications Technology (ICT)	Elmer Frederico N. Codilla
Labor and Employment	Mildred Joy P. Que
Prisons and Jail Management	Ronnan Christian M. Reposar
Public Information	Carlo P. Loreto
Public Order, Human Rights and Protective Services	Flaviano C. Centino Jr.
Public Utilities	Alan P. Ang
Rules, Laws and Privileges	Ronnan Christian M. Reposar
Senior Citizens	Elmer Frederico N. Codilla
Social Services	Ma. Martina L. Gimenez
Tourism, Trade and International Relations	Marie Kathryn V. Kabigting
Trade, Investments and Economic Affairs	Marie Kathryn V. Kabigting
Ways and Means	Wilson S. Uy
Women, Children and Family Welfare	Raissa J. Villasin
Youth and Sports Development	MJ Luinly D. Lumen

== See also ==
- Leyte
- Legislative districts of Leyte
