= Peter Børseth =

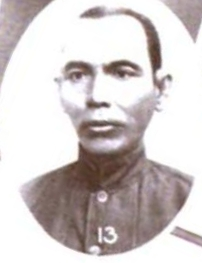
Børseth as governor of Leyte, published c. 1905, by the United States Bureau of the Census

Peter Adrianus Børseth (1 August 1864 – 9 August 1909) was a Norwegian-American military soldier who became the civil governor of Leyte, Philippine Islands, first as acting governor from 1903 to 1904, then was formally appointed from 1904 to 1906.

== Biography ==
Børseth was born in 1864 in Bergen, Norway. He immigrated to the United States in 1881 and later becoming a member of the Philippine Constabulary in the Philippine Islands.

=== Military campaign in the Philippines Islands ===
He was appointed second-class inspector on September 1, 1901, for the Philippine Constabulary. He still retained command of the constabulary alongside becoming provincial governor of Leyte.

A punitive expedition headed by Børseth was sent by Governor Joseph H. Grant to Biliran (then part of Leyte) from Tacloban to carry out a pacification campaign in response to the appearance of religious militants. The presence of insurrectos made the situation more complicated.

This campaign involved strict measures like reconcentration and security checks, which resulted in some civilian deaths. The "Dios-Dios" band attacking Biliran was likely led by "Papa" Pablo, a key figure in the religious movement. Alongside the campaign, negotiations took place with revolutionary leaders in Leyte, leading to the surrender of their forces by June 29, 1902. By then, Biliran was pacified, and Leyte experienced peace in mid-1902. Børseth was commended by American officials for his military campaign on the island of Biliran.

== As governor ==
The Constabulary faced serious accusations of abuse, sparking debate in the government and media. Following the surrenders in June 1902, then Governor Joseph H. Grant traveled to coast towns in Leyte to gather feedback on the Constabulary's actions and was pleased to find no complaints of abuse. Børseth became acting American civil governor of Leyte, beginning in March 1903 after Grant resigned. Later, journalist Jaime C. de Veyra campaigned against the Constabulary's alleged wrongdoings. Børseth, who won the 1904 gubernatorial elections, denied these allegations.

During his time as acting governor, conditions in Leyte were favorable. He was formally appointed governor of the province in 1904.

=== Attacks by the Pulahanes (Dios-Dios) ===
In August 1904, Børseth noted that the loss of carabaos due to a rinderpest epidemic led to smaller sugar crops. The epidemic also severely harmed cattle-raising. The deaths of many people from the 1902 cholera epidemic and the rinderpest losses drew local farmers and workers to Pulahan (Dios-Dios) cult leader Faustino Ablen, who promised them protection and lead them to the "seven churches of gold". Their belief to Ablen's declarations led to the attacks by the Pulahanes to the Constabulary in Ormoc as well as near municipalities in Leyte beginning in 1903. By March 1903, Pulahan leaders known by American authorities were Ablen and Juan Tamayo.

Børseth's search for Juan Tamayo, second-ranking leader of the Pulahanes in Leyte, led to Tamayo's death in 1905 and support for the religious movement begun to wane leading to its disbandment. Ablen, meanwhile, became inactive in the latter half of 1905.

=== Almeria and Kawayan ===
During his governorship, a conflict over religion led to the transfer of provincial government seat from Almeria to Kawayan. In 1905, Alcalde Margarito Sabornido and some councilors brought in Aglipayan priest Fr. Fernando Buyser to administer their religious affair, which upset Kawayan councilors and Roman Catholics who complained to authorities. As a result, Børseth suspended Sabornido and three councilors for three months and later made this suspension permanent while reorganizing the municipal government.

The transfer created a lasting issue between the people of Almeria and Kawayan, leading to a plebiscite by the Secretary of Interior. The results favored Kawayan, prompting suspended officials from Almeria to continue holding office in the previous town hall out of desperation.

== Later years and death ==
In February 1906, Børseth was defeated in the election for governor to Jaime C. de Veyra. American officials praised Børseth for maintaining peace in the province of Leyte while criticized de Veyra's administration for incompetence. De Veyra was an editor of the Filipino newspaper, El Renacimiento, over which he used to campaign against Børseth.

Børseth was one of the few remaining Americans who held offices by popular vote in the Philippines. Afterwards, he became assistant director of the Philippine Constabulary in August 1907, later returning to his native country and died in Haugesund, Norway on August 9, 1909.

Brgy. Borseth, Alangalang, Leyte is named after him.
