= Jaime C. de Veyra =

Filipino politician (1873–1963)

The Honorable Jaime C. de Veyra
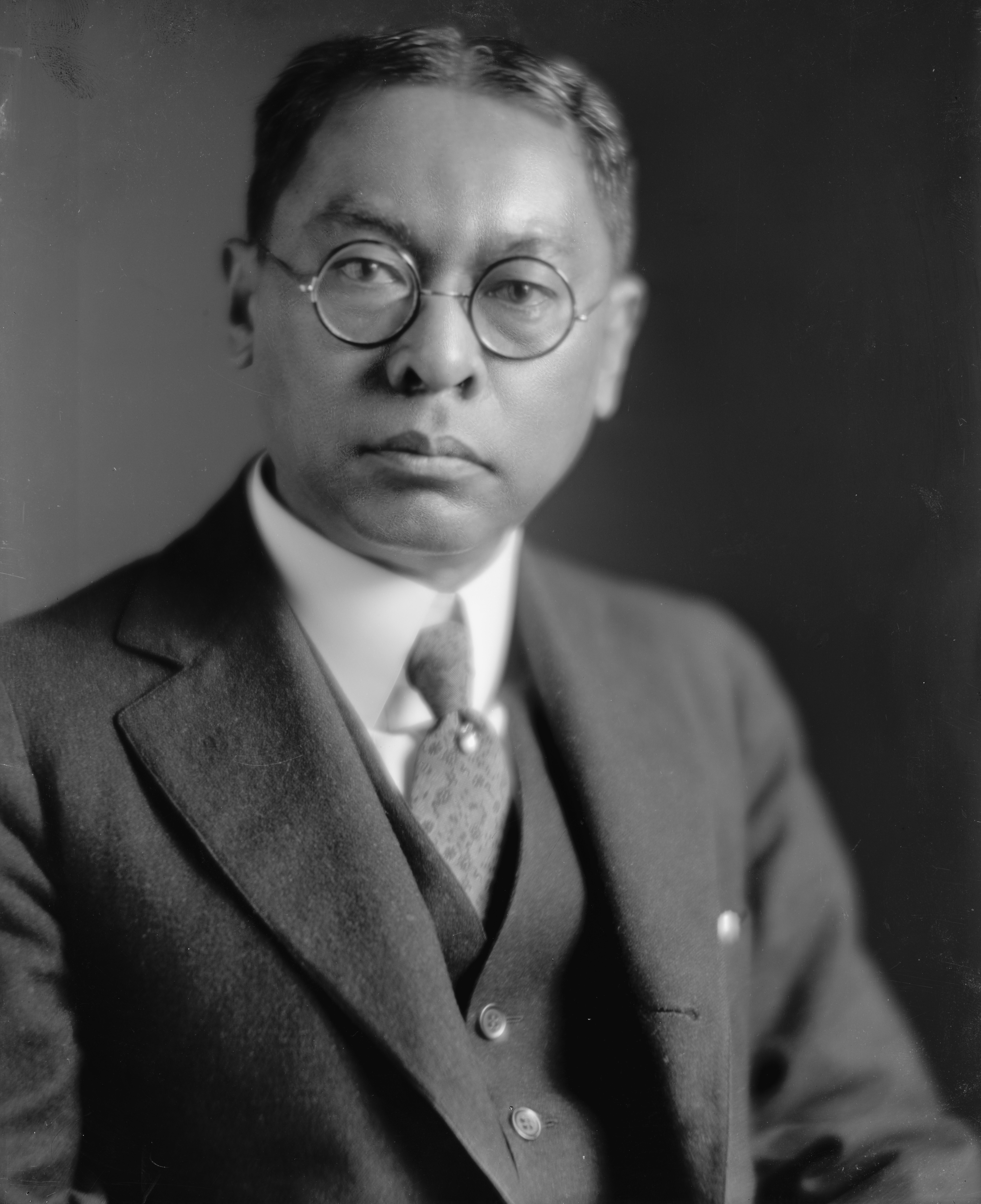
- De Veyra in c. 1905

Resident Commissioner to the U.S. House of Representatives from the Philippine Islands
- In office March 4, 1917 – March 4, 1923 Serving with Teodoro R. Yangco (1917-1920); Isauro Gabaldon (1920-1923)
- Preceded by: Manuel Earnshaw
- Succeeded by: Pedro Guevara

Chairman of the Institute of National Language
- In office 1937–1944

Professor and Head, Department of Spanish, University of the Philippines
- In office 1923–1937

Member of the Philippine National Assembly from Leyte's Fourth District
- In office October 16, 1907 – October 16, 1912
- Preceded by: Post created
- Succeeded by: Francisco Enage

Governor of Leyte
- In office 1906–1907
- Preceded by: Peter Børseth
- Succeeded by: Vicente Diaz

Personal details
- Born: November 4, 1873 Tanauan, Leyte, Captaincy General of the Philippines
- Died: March 7, 1963 (aged 89) Manila, Philippines
- Resting place: Basilica of the National Shrine of Our Lady of Mount Carmel Crypt, Quezon City
- Party: Nacionalista
- Spouse: Sofia Reyes
- Children: 4
- Education: University of Santo Tomas; Colegio de San Juan de Letran

Jaime Carlos de Veyra y Díaz (November 4, 1873 – March 7, 1963) was a Resident Commissioner to the U.S. House of Representatives from the Philippine Islands from 1917 to 1923 and Governor of Leyte from 1906 to 1907.

== Early life ==
He was born on November 4, 1873, in the town of Tanauan in Leyte province.

== Education ==
De Veyra attended both public and private schools. In 1888, he began studying at Colegio de San Juan de Letran in Manila, and graduated in 1893 with a Bachelor of Arts. In 1895, he began studying for a Bachelor of Law and a Bachelor of Philosophy and Letters at the University of Santo Tomas in Manila. He completed both degrees in 1898.

== Political career ==
From 1888 to 1899, he served as secretary to the Military Governor of Leyte, General Ambrosio Moxica.

In 1901, he was elected municipal councilor in the town of Cebu, and became municipal vice-president the following year. In 1903, he became president of the electoral assembly of Cebu. In 1904, de Veyra became Director of Liceo de Maasim, in Leyte, and served until 1905.

In 1905, he became an editor for the Spanish- and Tagalog-language newspaper El Renacimiento.

In 1906, de Veyra became Governor of Leyte. De Veyra, as governor, noted that hemp farmers experienced a business crisis starting in 1905 due to reduced credit and money shortages, resulting in the closure of Smith, Bell & Co. and Compaña Tabacalera by late August 1906, leaving four agencies open. Corruption were also a problem in the municipalities, with three municipal treasurers prosecuted for embezzlement in 1906.

De Veyra's administration also faced challenges due to the resurgence of Pulahanes attacks beginning in June 1906. After subsequent attacks in July and burning of barrios within Leyte's municipalities, de Veyra labeled them as terrorists.

In their incursions on different barrios toward the end of July they committed no pillage nor offended women. They prayed and compelled persons to follow them. They asked for whatever they needed—rice and black and red cloth. This conduct and the extent of the movement made some persons believe that it was a case of sedition or insurrection ... However, the burning of the barrios of Mercado (Mercadohay), Dagami and Donghol, Ormoc, taken in connection with the conditions brought about by the military and constabulary troops have unmasked them and shown them as they really are...

— Jaime C. de Veyra, Report of the Governor of the Province of Leyte (August 6, 1906)

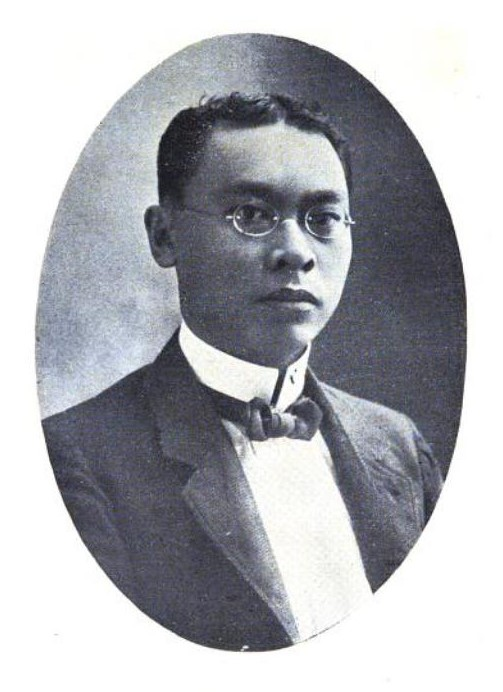
De Veyra as a member of the Philippine Assembly, 1908

He served until 1907, when he became a member of the first Philippine Assembly as the first representative of Leyte's Fourth District in the Philippine House of Representatives. He served in the Assembly until 1913, when he became a member of the Philippine Commission 1913–1916.

In 1916, de Veyra was appointed executive secretary of the Philippine Islands under Governor-General Francis Burton Harrison, and served until 1917.

In 1917, de Veyra was elected to the U.S. House of Representatives as a Resident Commissioner of the Philippines. He reelected in 1920 and served from March 4, 1917, to March 3, 1923. He was declined to be a candidate for renomination in 1922.

He engaged in journalistic work during 1923, and he became head of the department of Spanish, University of the Philippines at Manila, serving in such capacity from 1925 to 1936. From 1937 to 1944, de Veyra was the director of the Institute of National Language. He also served as historical researcher in charge of manuscripts and publications, National Library, and historical researcher, Office of the President, during 1946.

== Personal life ==
Jaime de Veyra married clubwoman and suffragette Sofia Reyes in 1907. They had four children, Their son Manuel E. de Veyra was a doctor during World War II serving at Bataan. Their son Jesus de Veyra became a judge, and dean of the Ateneo Law School from 1976 to 1981.

Sofia de Veyra died in 1953, aged 77 years old. Jaime de Veyra died in Manila, Philippines on March 7, 1963. Initially buried at La Loma Cemetery, his remains were transferred at Mt. Carmel Shrine in Quezon City.

== Images ==
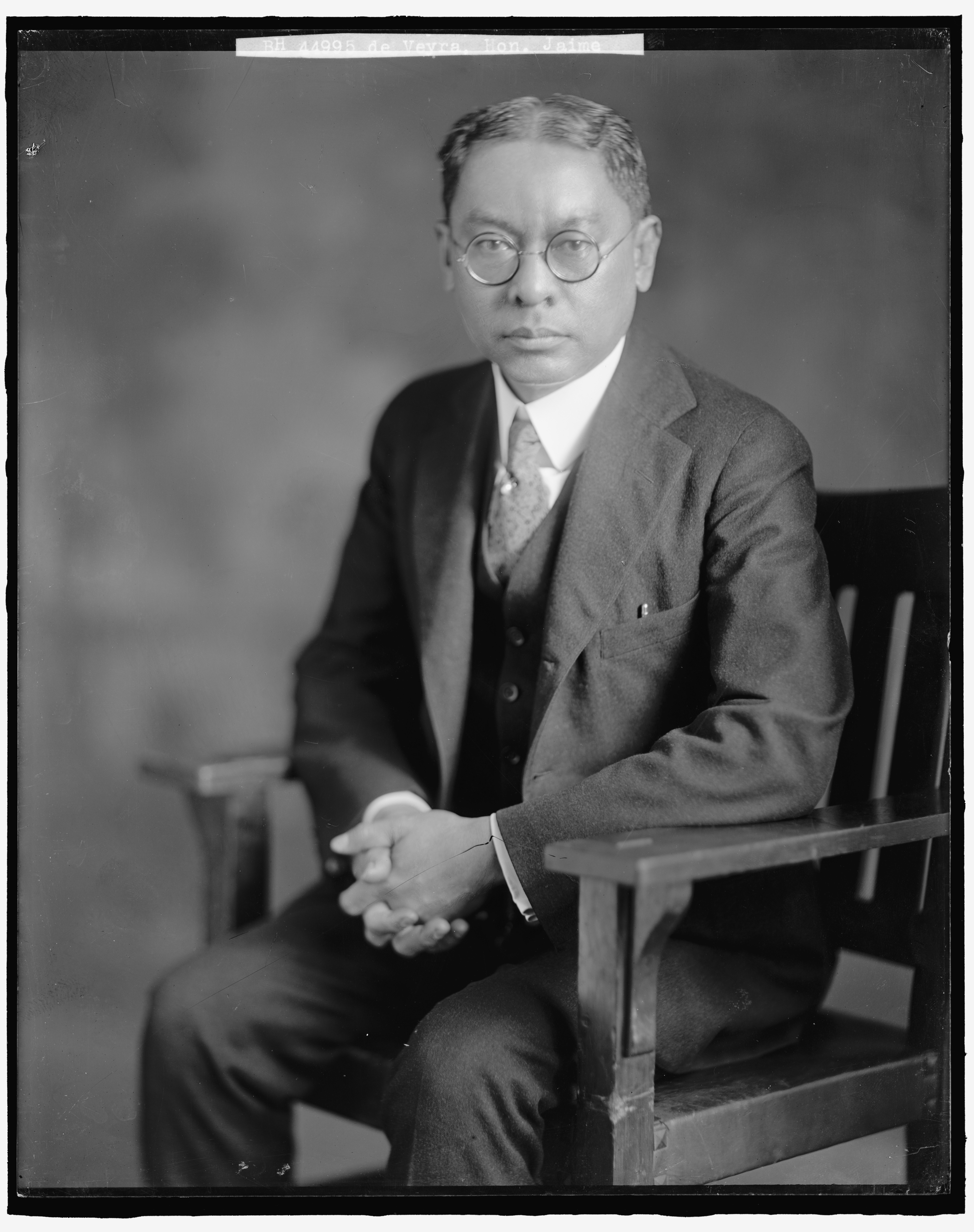
De Veyra in the United States

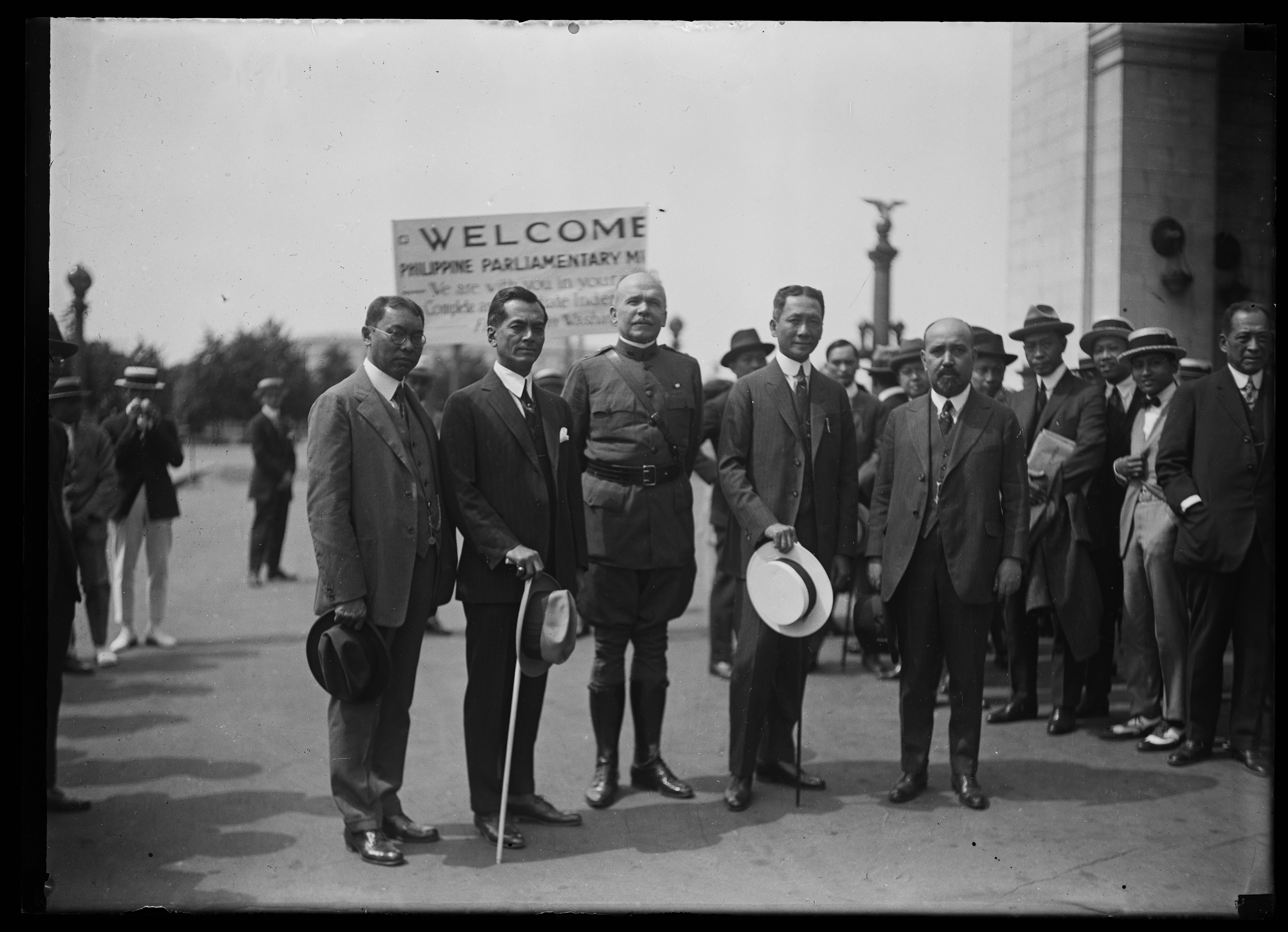
De Veyra welcoming the 2nd Philippine delegation. Left to right: De Veyra, Manuel L. Quezon, Frank McIntyre, Sergio Osmeña, and Isauro Gabaldón.

== See also ==
- Commission on the Filipino Language
- List of Asian Americans and Pacific Islands Americans in the United States Congress
- Resident Commissioner of the Philippines

U.S. House of Representatives
Preceded by Manuel Earnshaw	Resident Commissioner from the Philippines to the United States Congress; 1917–1923; Served alongside: Teodoro R. Yangco and Isauro Gabaldon	Succeeded by Pedro Guevara
House of Representatives of the Philippines
New title	Member of the Philippine Assembly from Leyte's 4th district 1907–1912	Succeeded by Francisco D. Enage
Political offices
Office established	Governor of Leyte; 1906–1907	Succeeded by Rodrigo Pariña
