= Carlo Loreto =

Filipino lawyer and politician

Member of the Leyte Provincial Board from the 5th district
- Incumbent
- Assumed office June 30, 2022
- In office June 30, 2004 – June 30, 2013

Vice Governor of Leyte
- In office June 30, 2013 – June 30, 2022
- Governor: Leopoldo Dominico Petilla
- Preceded by: Florante Cayunda, Jr.
- Succeeded by: Leonardo Javier, Jr.

Personal details
- Born: Carlo Petilla Loreto; October 6, 1971 (age 55) Tacloban, Leyte, Philippines
- Party: NPC (2004–2007; 2024–present)
- Other political affiliations: PDP (2018–2024); Liberal (2012–2018); Lakas (2007–2012)
- Spouse: Joane Karen G. Israel-Loreto
- Children: 3
- Parents: Jose V. Loreto (father); Asuncion P. Loreto (mother)
- Relatives: Janette Loreto-Garin (sister) Carmen Cari (aunt); Remedios Petilla (aunt); Jericho Petilla (cousin) Leopoldo Dominico Petilla (cousin)
- Education: San Sebastian College of Law
- Occupation: Vice Governor
- Profession: Lawyer
- Website: www.carloloreto.com.ph

Atty. Carlo Petilla Loreto (born October 6, 1971) is the former vice governor of Leyte from 2013 until 2022. He is a lawyer by profession and is an advocate of environmental and humanitarian concerns. He is also the national vice-president in the League of Vice-Governors of the Philippines (LVGP) for Visayas. He is the former national president in the Provincial Board Members League of the Philippines and national secretary general of the National Movement of Young Legislators (NYML). He also holds various positions in different organizations and committees.

== Early life and academic background ==
Loreto was born on October 6, 1971. His father, Jose V. Loreto, was a former provincial board member in Leyte while his mother, Asuncion E. Petilla-Loreto, is one of the board of directors in the Philippine Postal Corporation at present. His younger sister, Janette Petilla Loreto – Garin, served as secretary of the Philippine Department of Health (DOH), and was once a representative for the 1st district of Iloilo.

Loreto finished his elementary and secondary education in Leyte Normal University and Visayas State University Experimental Rural High School which is now known as Visayas State University Laboratory High School, respectively. He was a consistent dean's lister in Xavier University, where he also earned his AB philosophy in 1992. The next year, he took up Bachelor of Laws in San Sebastian College of Law. In 1997, he finished his degree and was awarded as an Outstanding Law Intern. Four years after, he took up MS computer science and completed all his academic units in AMA Computer University, Quezon City.

He took up masteral for Law in San Beda College's Graduate School of Law. He also studied Executive MBA and earned all his units in 2009 at the Asian Development Foundation College, Tacloban City.

He passed the civil service examination in 1993, one year after he got his college degree. It was in 2003 that he passed the bar examination.

== Political journey ==
At 34, Loreto was proclaimed as board member of the Sangguniang Panlalawigan of Leyte in 2004. In 2013, after three terms of being a board member, he ran and won for the vice governor position.

From 2007 to 2011, aside from being a senior board member of Leyte, Loreto was also the national secretary-general for the National Movement of Young Legislators (NMYL) and the regional and provincial chairman in 2004, for Eastern Visayas and Leyte, respectively.

From 2002 until 2004, he worked as legislative liaison specialist for the Department of Transportation and Communications (also known as DOTC). Under the same agency, he was also a member of the Committee on Japan Telecoms Grant, under Counter Terrorism. He was also a part of the Maritime Industrial Park (MIP) Project Team.

From 1991 to 2001, Loreto worked at the Office of the Presidential Adviser for Political Affairs, Office of the President, as a technical assistant. He helped in crafting policy formations and in reviewing proposed legislation.

In 2002, for ASEAN TELSOM/TELMIN, he was named chairman of the committee and was assigned in the special concerns and events.

In 2008, Loreto, together with Senator Kiko Pangilinan, and ex-National Youth Commission Commissioner Bam Aquino, embarked on Campus Tours around Eastern Visayas to promote transparency, accountability, people empowerment, and good governance.

During his term as the vice governor of Leyte, he has helped in passing useful ordinances together with the other members of the provincial legislative body. One of these is the ‘lantaka ordinance’ which prohibits the use of “lantaka” or home-made cannon which are usually used to make noise, especially during holidays. Lantaka made of cans and plastic pipes are banned, and only those made of bamboo are allowed under the said ordinance. The Vice Governor himself has authored the Joint Venture Ordinance, which simplifies the relationship between the provincial government and their partners from the private sector. This ordinance also identifies the sharing of income from projects of the government and private partners.

In line with the Vice Governor's advocacy for environmental concerns, several measures for the preservation of the condition of the environment in the province were also approved passed during his time. While he was the chairman of the Committee on Environment and Natural Resources, together with the Sangguniang Panlalawigan, Loreto has passed the Environment Code of the Province of Leyte.

Being the chairman of his province's education committee, Loreto created an ordinance which aims to make all schools more pollution-free so that it would be more beneficial for students and can help aid learning at school.

The provincial board members of Leyte were constantly reminded by the Vice Governor to stop creating or supporting “ghost” ordinances and that everyone should follow the right steps and procedures, especially the fact that ordinances are to be in written form when passed.

== Personal life ==
Loreto has three children to his wife Joane Karen G. Israel-Loreto.

== Honors and awards ==
Loreto was recognized as one of the Most Outstanding Legislators for 2008, which was awarded by the National Youth Commission (NYC) from the Office of the President of the Philippines.

== Organizations and committees ==
Loreto also holds various positions in different organizations and committees. He is the charter president for the Baybay Lions Club, president for Baybay “Buko Pandan” Jaycees (JCI Philippines), and the national president of the Provincial Board Members League of the Philippines from 2012 to 2013.

He is also the committee chairman for the following: Blue Ribbon Committee, for the Sangguniang Panlalawigan of Leyte (from 2010 up to present), Committee on Education for the Sangguniang Panlalawigan of Leyte (from 2010 up to Present), Committee on Rules, Laws, and Privileges for the Sangguniang Panlalawigan of Leyte (from 2004 until 2010), and the Committee on Environment and Natural Resources for the Sangguniang Panlalawigan of Leyte (also from 2004 until 2010).

He is also the Majority Floor Leader for the Sangguniang Panlalawigan of Leyte, from 2007 until 2013. He is also a member of the board of regents in his previous school, Leyte Normal University in Tacloban City, from 2010 until present. He is also the assistant auditor for the Union of Local Authorities of the Philippines in the year 2011.

Political offices
Preceded by Florante Cayunda Jr.	Vice Governor of Leyte; 2013–2022	Succeeded by Leonardo Javier
