= Rafael Martinez (politician) =

Filipino politician

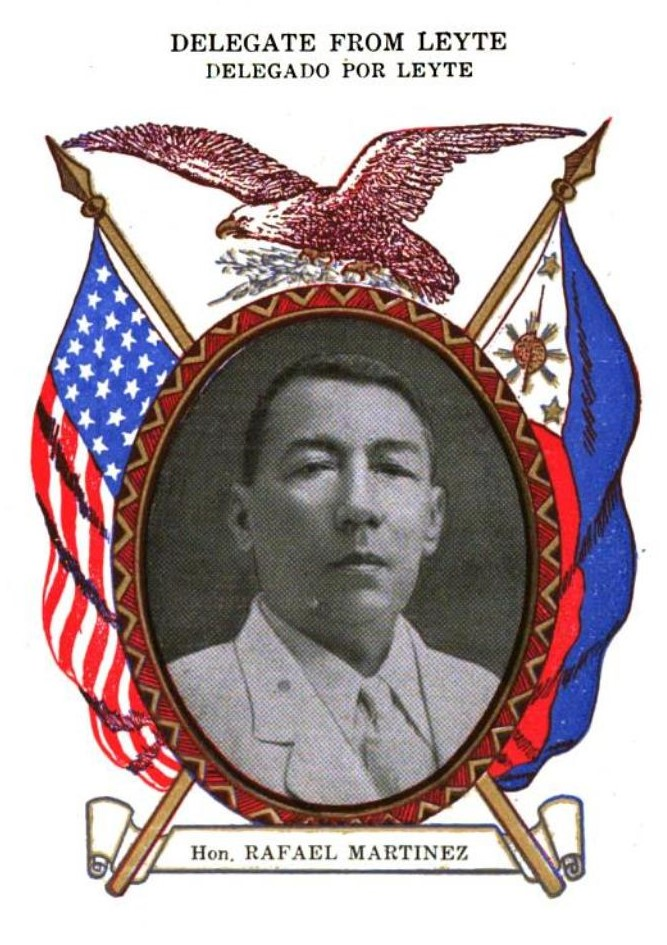
- Martinez as a delegate to the Philippine Constitutional Convention, published by Benipayo Press (c. 1935)

Senator of the Philippines
- In office 25 May 1945 – 23 April 1946

Governor of Leyte
- In office 1936 – 30 December 1941
- Preceded by: Honorio Lopez
- Succeeded by: Ruperto Kangleon

Personal details
- Born: 24 October 1873 Tubigon, Bohol, Captaincy General of the Philippines
- Died: 27 July 1953 (aged 79) Cebu City, Cebu, Philippines
- Party: Nacionalista

Rafael Corro Martinez (10 October 1873 – 27 July 1953) was a Filipino politician.

== Early life and education ==
Martinez was born in Tubigon, Bohol to Celestino Martinez a Spaniard from Asturias and Carlota Corro of Cebu on 10 October 1873, he had 9 siblings. He went to Spain at the age of 16 and pursued his higher education in Porcuna and Bilbao. After he returned to the Philippines, he engaged in farming, cattle-raising and other agricultural activities before entering politics.

== Political career ==
Martinez was elected in 1934 as a delegate to the Constitutional Convention from the 1st district of Leyte. In 1936, he was appointed Governor of Leyte, and was elected in his own right in 1937. He was elected to the Philippine Senate in 1941 as a Nacionalista candidate but was only able to take office in 1945 due to the Japanese occupation of the Philippines during the Second World War. He served until 1946. He ran for re-election for senator in the 1946 Philippine general election under the Nacionalista Party tandem of Sergio Osmeña and Eulogio Rodriguez, but lost, ranking 28th out of the 57 candidates.
