= Leopoldo Petilla =

Filipino politician

The Honorable Leopoldo Dominico L. Petilla
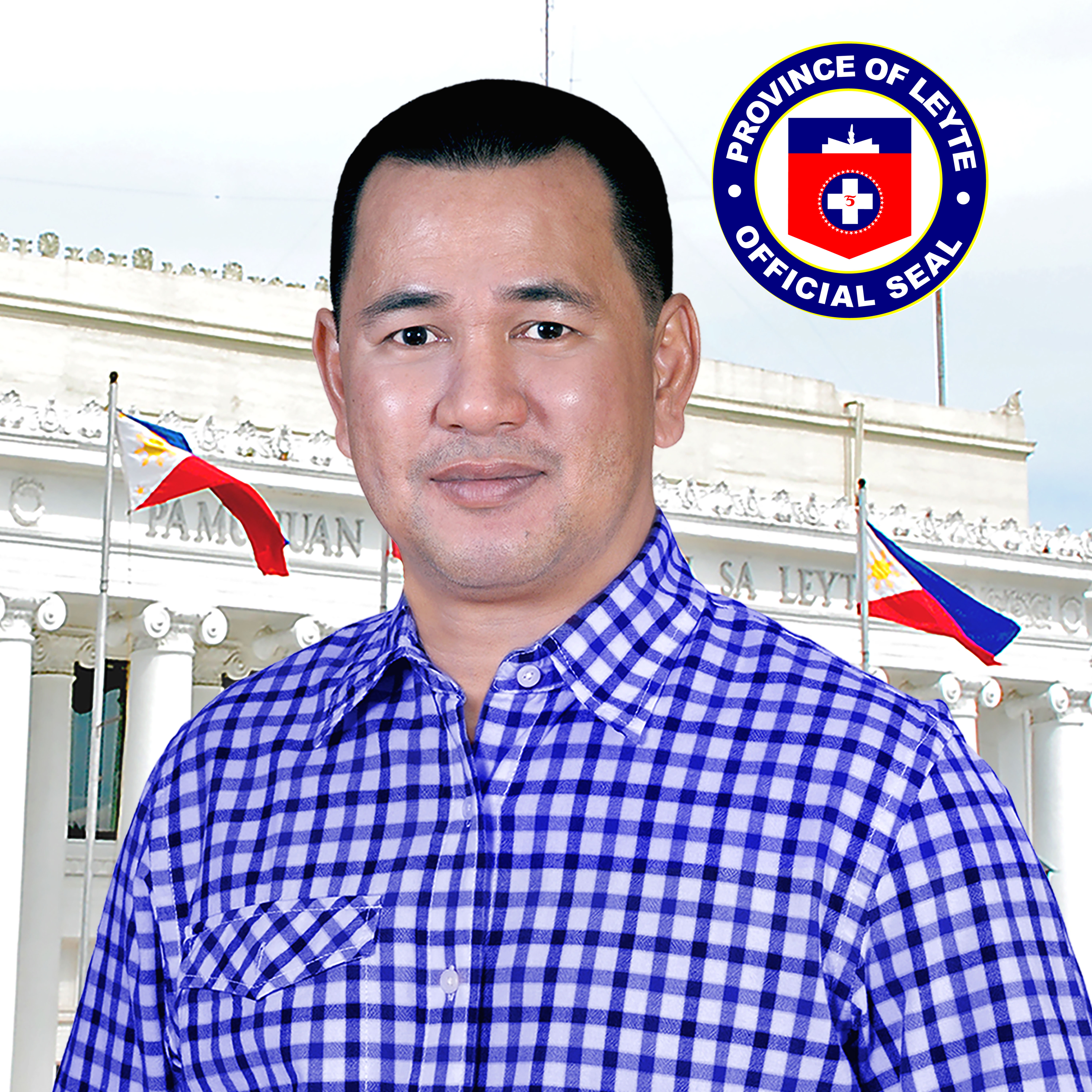

Governor of Leyte
- In office June 30, 2013 – June 30, 2022
- Vice Governor: Carlo Loreto
- Preceded by: Ma. Mimietta S. Bagulaya
- Succeeded by: Jericho Petilla

Personal details
- Born: Leopoldo Dominico L. Petilla Palo, Leyte, Philippines
- Party: PDP (2017–present)
- Other political affiliations: Liberal (2012–2017)
- Relations: Jericho Petilla (brother)

Leopoldo Dominico Loreto Petilla is a Filipino politician from the province of Leyte in the Philippines. He has served as Governor of Leyte from 2013 until 2022. He was first elected as Governor of the province in 2013 and was re-elected in 2016 and 2019. He is the son of former Leyte Governors Leopoldo Petilla Sr. (1992–1995) and Remedios Petilla (1995–2004). His older brother, Jericho Petilla is the former Secretary of Energy (2012–2015) and preceded and succeeded him as governor of Leyte (2004–2012, 2022–present)

== Electoral history ==
Electoral history of Leopoldo Petilla
Year	Office	Party	Votes received				Result
Year	Office	Party	Total	%	P.	Swing	Result
2013	Governor of Leyte	Liberal	394,243	100.00%	1st	—N/a	Unopposed
2016	Governor of Leyte	Liberal	454,308	94.49%	1st	-5.51	Won
2019	Governor of Leyte	PDP–Laban	450,199	93.90%	1st	-0.59	Won

Political offices
Preceded by Ma. Mimietta Bagulaya	Governor of Leyte; 2013–2022	Succeeded by Jericho Petilla
