= Governor of Leyte =

Local chief executive

- Gobernador han Lalawigan han Leyte
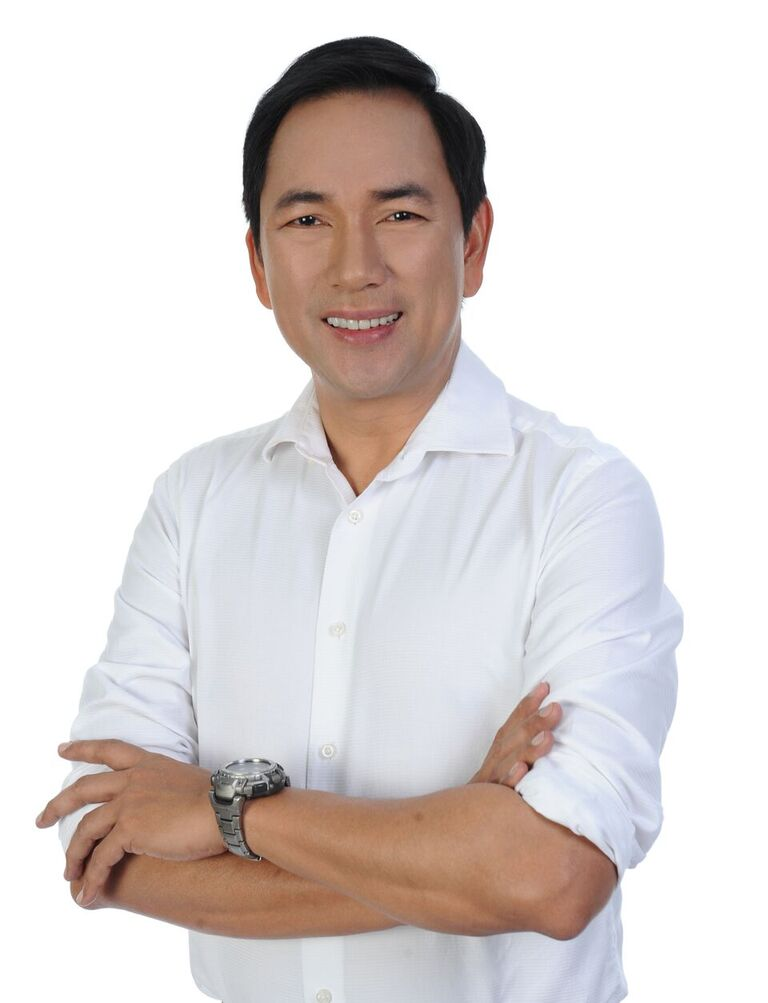
- Incumbent; Jericho Petilla since June 30, 2022
- Style: Governor, Honorable Governor
- Residence: New Leyte Provincial Capitol Complex; Palo, Leyte
- Term length: 3 years
- Formation: 1768 (Separation of the former province of Samar and Leyte)

The governor of Leyte is the local chief executive of the Philippine province of Leyte.

== List ==
Order	Image	Name	Year in Office	Notes
Military Governor of the Province of Leyte
1		Joseph H. Grant	1901–1903	Resigned in March 1903, Peter Børseth became acting governor
2		Peter Børseth	1903–1904 (acting), 1904–1906	American civil governor of Leyte. Unpopular among the provincial citizens, he was eventually succeeded by Jaime C. de Veyra by popular vote.

Order	Image	Name	Year in Office	Notes
Governor of the Province of Leyte
3		Jaime C. de Veyra	1906–1907	Served until 1907 due to being elected member of the Philippine Assembly
4		Vicente Diaz	1907–1908	Appointed by the governor-general to finish De Veyra's term.
5		Francisco Enage	1908-1909	
6		Pastor Navarro	1909–1912	
7		Jose Maria B. Veloso	1912–1916	Renounced the position on his second term to be a Senator from 1916 to 1919
8		Julian de Veyra	1916–1917	
9		Salvador Demeterio	1917-1919	Elected through a special election conducted in June 1917.
10		Eugenio Jaro	1919–1919	
11		Jose Maria B. Veloso	1919–1922	
12		Honorio Lopez	1924–1927	
13		Rafael Martinez	1936–1941	
14		Bernardo Torres	1941–1944	
15		Ruperto Kangleon	1944-1946	Military Governor of Leyte
16		Maria Salud Vivero - Parreño	1946-1948	Appointed by President Sergio Osmeña prior to the restoration of the Civilian Government in Tacloban. The First Female Governor of Leyte.
17		Catalino T. Landia	1948 - 1949	
18		Mamerto S. Ribo	1949 - 1953	
19		Bernardo Torres	1953 - 1957	
20		Ildefonso J. Cinco	1958 - 1963	
21		Norberto Romualdez Jr.	1964–1967	
22		Benjamin Romualdez	1967–1986	
23		Benjamin P. Abella	1986–1988 (Acting)	
24		Adelina Y. Larrazabal	1988–1992	
25		Leopoldo E. Petilla	1992- 1995	
26		Edgardo M. Enerlan	1995	
27		Remedios L. Petilla	1995–2004	
28		Jericho Petilla	2004–2012	Appointed secretary of the Department of Energy
29		Ma. Mimietta S. Bagulaya	2012–2013	Assumed office for the remainder of 7 months.
30		Leopoldo Dominico Petilla	2013–2022	
(28)		Jericho Petilla	2022–incumbent	
