= 2016 Philippine general election =

- Registered: 55,739,911
- Turnout: 44,979,151 (80.69% ▲4.92pp from 2013)
- Presidential election
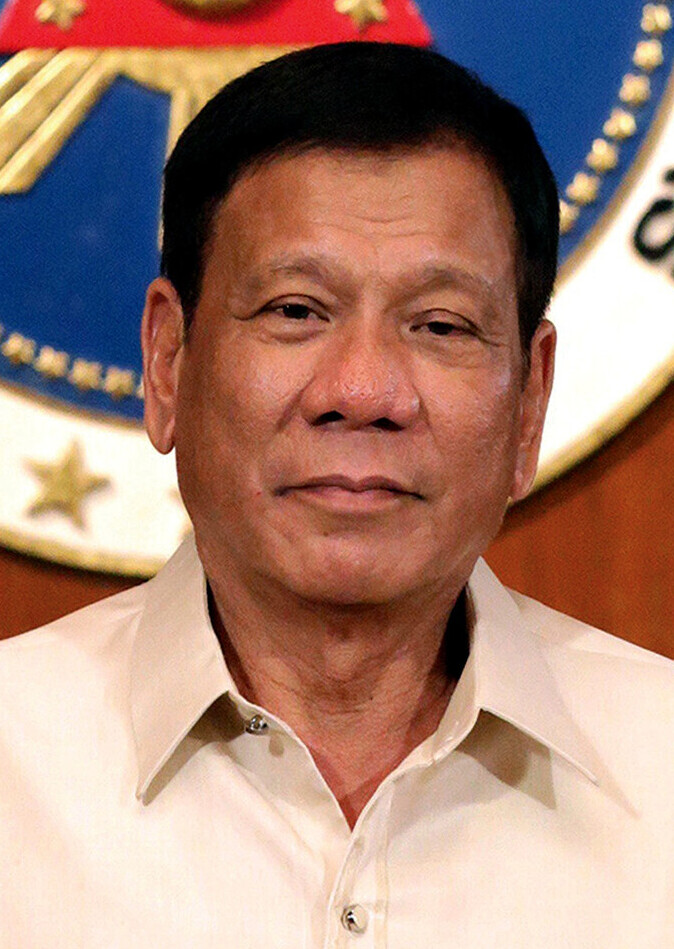

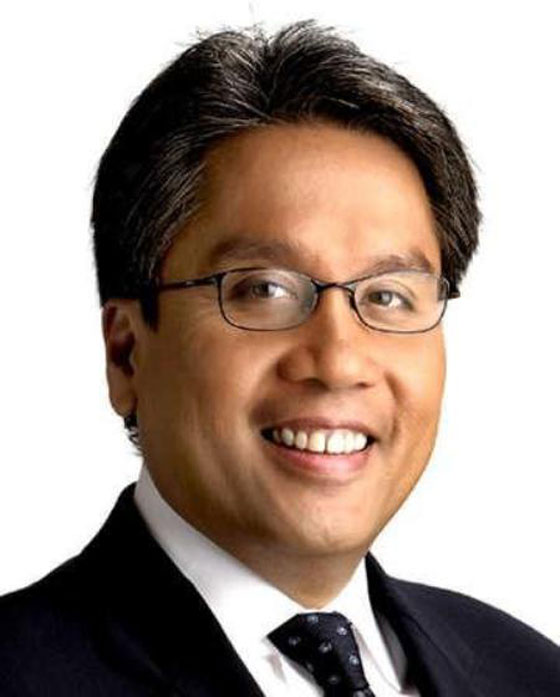

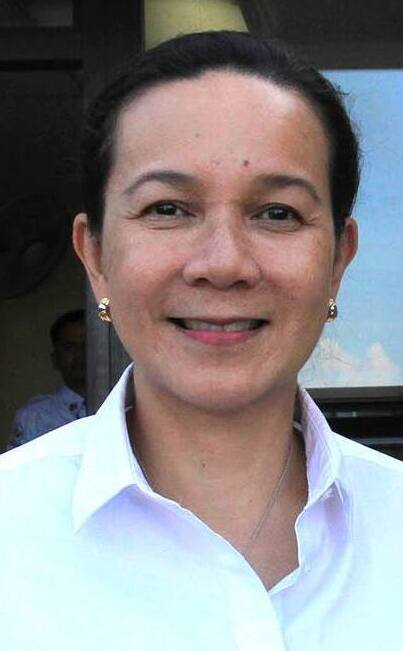
Candidate	Rodrigo Duterte	Mar Roxas	Grace Poe
Party	PDP–Laban	Liberal	Independent
Running mate	Alan Peter Cayetano	Leni Robredo	Francis Escudero
Popular vote	16,601,997	9,978,175	9,100,991
Percentage	39.02%	23.45%	21.39%
President before election
Benigno Aquino III
Liberal
Elected President
Rodrigo Duterte
PDP–Laban
- Vice presidential election
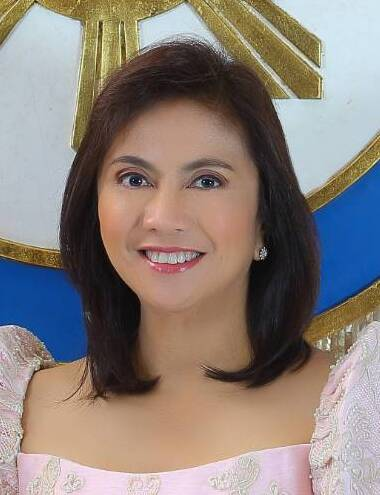

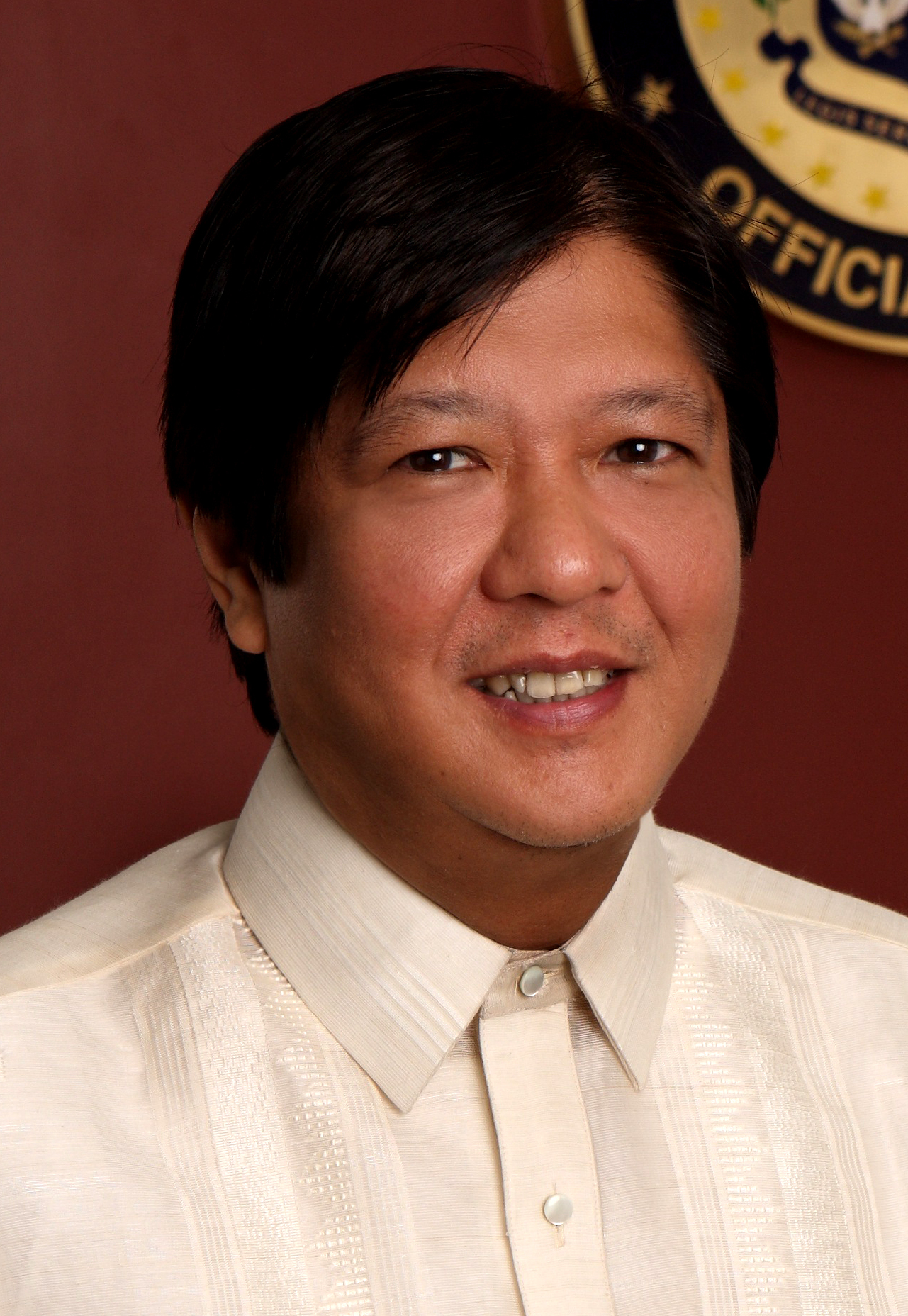

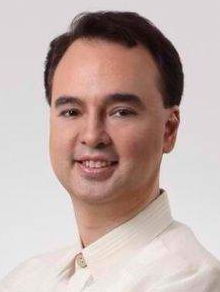
Candidate	Leni Robredo	Bongbong Marcos	Alan Peter Cayetano
Party	Liberal	Independent	Independent
Popular vote	14,418,817	14,155,344	5,903,379
Percentage	35.11%	34.77%	14.38%
Vice President before election
Jejomar Binay
UNA
Elected Vice President
Leni Robredo
Liberal
- Senate election

12 (of the 24) seats to the Senate of the Philippines 13 seats needed for a majority
Alliance	KDM	PGP	UNA
Seats won	7	4	1
Popular vote	140,756,973	32,154,139	24,660,722
Percentage	43.81%	30.83%	7.68%
Senate President before election
Franklin Drilon
Liberal
Elected Senate President
Koko Pimentel
PDP–Laban
- House of Representatives election
- All 297 seats in the House of Representatives of the Philippines; 149 seats needed for a majority
Party	Vote %	Seats	+/–
Liberal	41.72	115	+6
NPC	17.04	42	0
NUP	9.67	23	−1
Nacionalista	9.42	24	+6
UNA	6.62	11	+3
Others	12.41	22	−2
Party-list	—	59	0
This lists parties that won seats. See the complete results below.
Speaker before	Speaker after
Feliciano Belmonte Jr. Liberal	Pantaleon Alvarez; PDP–Laban

A general election in the Philippines took place on May 9, 2016, for executive and legislative branches for all levels of government – national, provincial, and local, except for the barangay officials.

At the top of the ballot was the election for successors to Philippine President Benigno Aquino III and Vice President Jejomar Binay. There were also elections for:

- 12 seats to the Senate;
- All 297 seats to the House of Representatives;
- All governors, vice governors, and 772 seats to provincial boards for 81 provinces;
- All mayors and vice mayors for 145 cities and for 1,489 municipalities;
- All members of the city councils and 11,924 seats on municipal councils; and
- Governor, vice governor and all 24 seats in the regional assembly of the Autonomous Region in Muslim Mindanao.

The regional elections for the Autonomous Region in Muslim Mindanao (ARMM) were scheduled for May 9, but that would have changed if the Bangsamoro political entity had replaced the ARMM. The ARMM elections pushed through, as scheduled.

Barangay and Sangguniang Kabataan elections were scheduled for October 2016, but were postponed to 2017. Congress postponed anew the barangay elections to May 2018.

Elections are organized, run, and adjudicated by the Commission on Elections better known as COMELEC with appeals under certain conditions allowed to the Regional Trial Courts, the Congress of the Philippines, or the Supreme Court of the Philippines sitting as the House of Representatives Electoral Tribunal, the Senate Electoral Tribunal, or the Presidential Electoral Tribunal.

== Preparation ==
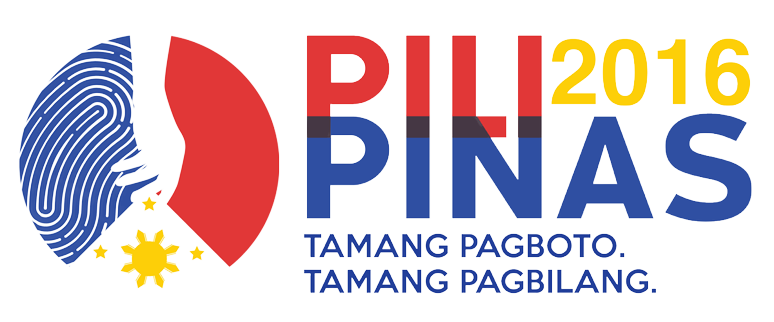
Logo of the 2016 NLE used in official election awareness campaigns.

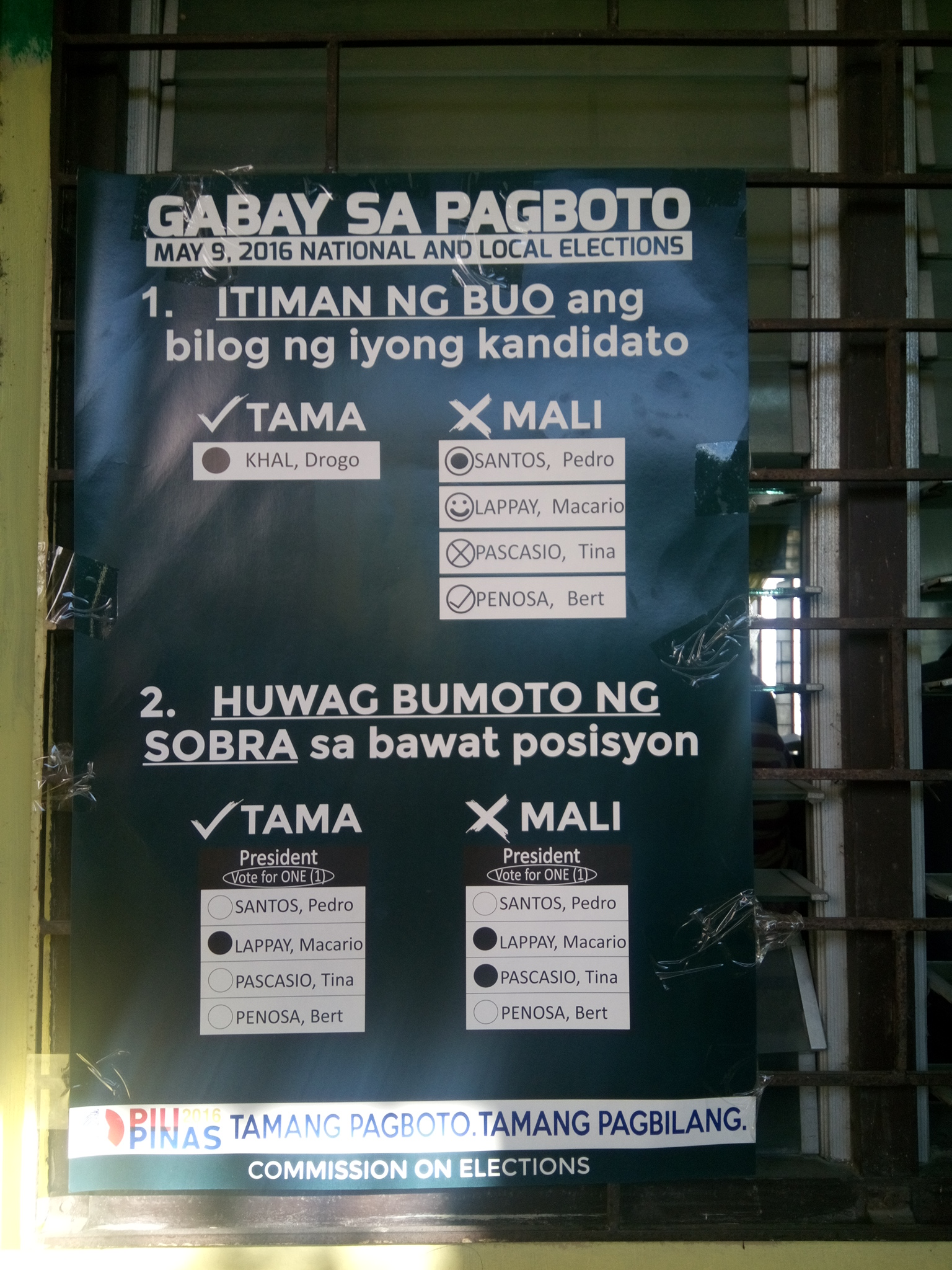
Instructions on how to vote posted outside polling precincts during the election.

=== Commission on Elections membership ===
On May 4, 2015, President Benigno Aquino III appointed Presidential Commission on Good Government chairman Andres D. Bautista as chairman, and former Commission on Audit member Rowena Guanzon and Bangsamoro Business Club's board chairman Sherif Abas as commissioners. Bautista replaced Sixto Brillantes, while Guanzon and Abas replaced Lucenito Tagle and Elias Yusoph, who all retired in February 2015. All appointees will serve until February 2022.

A few days after the announcement, it was revealed that Abas is a nephew of Mohagher Iqbal, the chief negotiator of the Moro Islamic Liberation Front. Bautista said that Abas confirmed to him that he is Iqbal's nephew. Iqbal neither confirmed nor denied their relationship, calling it is a non-issue, and that there's nothing wrong if his nephew is appointed to a sensitive position.

Bautista was confirmed by the Commission on Appointments on September 21; meanwhile, Abas' confirmation was deferred because Senator Alan Peter Cayetano, who was not present when Bautista was confirmed, still had questions to ask Abas.

=== Voter registration ===
The commission started voter registration for the elections on May 6, 2014, to October 31, 2015. Under the law, the 9.6 million registered voters who do not have biometrics attached their registration will not be allowed to vote. Voter registration was suspended from October 12 to 16 to give way to the filing of candidacies. From October 17 to 31, the commission would extend its hours up to 9:00 p.m. to accommodate last minute registrants.

Voter registration was suspended in Puerto Princesa from April 20 to May 17, 2015, because of the 2015 mayoral recall election. The Voters' Registration Act prohibits voter registration during recall elections.

In June 2015, the commission denied reports that some voters' biometrics were lost, saying that they were only "degraded," and that "two thousand" voters would have to have their biometrics taken again. A month later, the commission opened booths in Metro Manila and Luzon to further registration. By that time, there were still 4.3 million voters with incomplete biometrics. The commission, seeing the successful turnout for registration at the malls, mulled holding the elections itself inside such malls. The commission's en banc had already approved "in principle" the mall voting process. Near the end of the month, the commission said that the number of voters without biometrics has decreased to 3.8 million.

By mid-August, the commission announced that they had purged 1.3 million records from the voters' list, including the deceased and voters who did not vote in the two immediate preceding elections, the 2013 general and 2013 barangay, and that voters without biometrics had fallen to 3.5 million. By August 30, the number of registered voters without biometrics data had fallen to 3.1 million; this was after a Social Weather Stations poll came out that as much as 9.7 million people still had not updated their biometrics yet and could be disenfranchised.

The Commission on Elections concluded the 17-month registration on October 31, and offered no extension, except for voters in Cagayan Valley which was devastated by Typhoon Lando, who were given until the next day to finish theirs. This was despite a petition to the Supreme Court by the Kabataan party-list to extend registration until January 8, 2016. Acting on the said petition, the Supreme Court issued a restraining order on the No Bio, No Boto mandatory voters biometrics campaign on December 1. It was later lifted after 16 days.

=== Counting machines ===
The 2016 general elections represented the largest electronic vote counting exercise in history as 92,509 vote counting machines were used to digitize voter-marked ballots and transmit the results to the Municipal Board of Canvassers.

In April 2015, the counting machines were leased from London-based Smartmatic after the Supreme Court of the Philippines invalidated the 300 million-peso contract between the Commission and the Smartmatic-TIM consortium for diagnostics and repair of 80,000 Precinct Count Optical Scan (PCOS) machines. The court said that the commission "failed to justify its resort to direct contracting."

Two months later, the Commission conducted a mock election where a "hybrid" system of manual counting and electronic transmission of results was tested out. Gus Lagman, former elections commissioner and a proponent of the hybrid system, pointed out the system's money-saving advantage and reliability, as opposed to full automation where the results can be manipulated. Meanwhile, the Commission overturned its self-imposed disqualification of Smartmatic from bidding on counting machines.

Senator Francis Escudero disapproved of the use of the hybrid system, saying "it brings back memories of the Hello Garci controversy". A few days later, the Commission informed the House of Representatives Committee on Suffrage and Electoral Reforms that they had decided not to use the hybrid system.

On a House of Representatives committee hearing held on late July, Elections chairman Andres Bautista told lawmakers that the Commission had decided to award Smartmatic-TIM a 1.7 billion peso contract to lease 23,000 OMR counting machines. Days later, the Commission declared the bidding for the refurbishing 80,000 machines as a failure, after two of the three bidders backed out, while the third was disqualified.

On August 13, the Commission agreed to lease 94,000 new OMR machines for 7.9 billion pesos, while the old machines used for 2010 and 2013 elections would be used for the 2019 elections.

By September, the Commission sought the transfer the site manufacturing the voting machines from China to Taiwan after it received intelligence reports from the military in July that China might sabotage the elections. Smartmatic, the manufacturer of the machines, acquiesced to the request. China, meanwhile, denied any plans of sabotaging the election, calling it "sheer fabrication." Smartmatic also won the contract worth P500 million for the electronic results transmission services of the voting machines.

On March 4, the Commission unanimously voted to disallow the issuance of voting receipt to voters, although onscreen verification was allowed, which would take an additional 15 seconds per voter.

The Commission eventually aborted mall voting and allowed the use of replacement ballots.

=== Results transmission ===
Election authorities, with the help of election services provider Smartmatic, created a Virtual private network (VPN) for the secure and reliable transmission of electoral data. To guarantee nationwide coverage, Smartmatic coordinated the main telecom companies in the Philippines.

This VPN was used to transmit the votes of over 44 million citizens from 36.805 polling centres. On election night, 4 hours after the polls closed, 80% vote counting machines had transmitted the election data, setting a new record for the Philippines.

Speed was one of the main reasons why Philippine authorities decided to automate elections. As an archipelago comprising over 7,000 islands, several of which lack a proper communications infrastructure, the transmission of results posed a challenge.

=== Bans ===
==== Gun Ban ====
The election gun ban was implemented starting from January 9, 2016, the official start of the 90-day election period. Francisco Pobe, regional director of COMELEC-13, also pointed out that the candidate should not bring bodyguards without gun ban exemption. Go Act, a pro-gun group formed by gun owners filed a petition before the Supreme Court to fully stop the implementation of the election gun ban.

== Calendar ==
On August 18, 2015, the commission released the calendar of activities for the May 9, 2016 national and local elections:

Activity	Start	End	Length of time
Voter registration	May 6, 2014	October 31, 2015	15.5 months
Holding of political conventions	September 12, 2015	September 30, 2015	25 days
Filing of candidacies and nominees of party-list groups	October 12, 2015	October 16, 2015	5 days
Election period	January 10, 2016	June 15, 2016	6 months
Campaign period for president, vice president, senators and party-lists	February 9, 2016	May 7, 2016	3 months
Campaign period for district representatives and local officials	March 26, 2016	May 7, 2016	1.5 months
Campaign ban for Holy Week	March 24, 2016	March 25, 2016	2 days
Casting of ballots of overseas absentee voters	April 9, 2016	May 9, 2016	1 month
Casting of ballots of local absentee voters	April 27, 2016	April 29, 2016	3 days
Campaign ban	May 8, 2016	May 9, 2016	2 days
Election Day	6:00 a.m. of May 9, 2016	5:00 p.m. of May 9, 2016	11 hours
Term of office winning candidates for local officials and representatives	June 30, 2016	June 30, 2019	3 years
Term of office winning candidates for president, vice president and senators	June 30, 2016	June 30, 2022	6 years
First session day of the 17th Congress and State of the Nation Address	July 25, 2016		—N/a

Following a request by the Centrist Democratic Party of the Philippines, the commission extended the period for holding political conventions to October 8, 2015. The commission did not extend the deadline of filing of candidacies, though.

The commission originally envisioned to release an "almost" final list of candidates on December 15, but postponed it to December 23. The commission did release a "final list" of vice presidential candidates on December 23, but Chairman Andres D. Bautista that disqualification cases on other positions led them to postpone the release to January 20, when the commission is expected to resolve all disqualification cases.

On January 21, the commission released an "initial" list of candidates for all positions. The list is subject to trimming as the disqualification cases on presidential, vice presidential and senatorial cases are to be resolved with finality.

== Debates ==
The Commission on Elections held three debates for presidential candidates—in Mindanao last February 2016, in Visayas last March 2016, and in Luzon last April 2016. A vice-presidential debate was also held in Metro Manila last April 10, 2016.

The commission identified the media entities who had covered the debates: GMA Network (E16: Eleksyon 2016) and Philippine Daily Inquirer (February 21), TV5 (Bilang Pilipino: Boto sa Pagbabago 2016 – English: As a Filipino: Vote for Change 2016) and Philippine Star (March 20), CNN Philippines (The Filipino Votes), Business Mirror, and Rappler (April 10), and ABS-CBN (Halalan 2016: Ipanalo ang Pamilyang Pilipino – English: Election 2016: Winning the Filipino Family) and Manila Bulletin (April 24).

The commission also encouraged non-governmental organizations to hold debates for Senate and local positions.

== Candidates ==
The COMELEC named the Liberal Party (LP / Liberal) as the dominant majority party, the United Nationalist Alliance as the dominant minority party, and the following as major political parties:

- Nacionalista Party (Nacionalista)
- Nationalist People’s Coalition (NPC)
- PDP–Laban
- Kilusang Bagong Lipunan (KBL)
- Lakas–CMD (Lakas)
- Aksyon Demokratiko (Aksyon)
- National Unity Party (NUP)

=== Administration ticket ===
Koalisyon ng Daang Matuwid
Position	#	Name	Party
President	5.	Mar Roxas	Liberal
Vice president	5.	Leni Robredo	Liberal
Senator	4.	Ina Ambolodto	Liberal
Senator	12.	Leila de Lima	Liberal
Senator	15.	Franklin Drilon	Liberal
Senator	19.	TG Guingona	Liberal
Senator	20.	Risa Hontiveros	Akbayan
Senator	25.	Panfilo Lacson	Independent
Senator	27.	Mark Lapid	Aksyon
Senator	37.	Cresente Paez	Independent
Senator	40.	Francis Pangilinan	Liberal
Senator	41.	Jericho Petilla	Liberal
Senator	42.	Ralph Recto	Liberal
Senator	49.	Joel Villanueva	Liberal

=== Dominant minority party's ticket ===
United Nationalist Alliance
Position	#	Name	Party
President	1.	Jojo Binay	UNA
Vice president	3.	Gringo Honasan	UNA
Senator	18.	Dick Gordon*	Independent
Senator	23.	Jacel Kiram	UNA
Senator	24.	Alma Moreno	UNA
Senator	25.	Panfilo Lacson*	Independent
Senator	26.	Rey Langit	UNA
Senator	31.	Allan Montaño	UNA
Senator	33.	Getulio Napeñas	UNA
Senator	34.	Susan Ople*	Nacionalista
Senator	36.	Manny Pacquiao	UNA
Senator	43.	Martin Romualdez*	Lakas
Senator	46.	Tito Sotto*	NPC
Senator	50.	Migz Zubiri*	Independent

*Guest candidate

=== Other tickets ===
Partido Galing at Puso
Position	#	Name	Party
President	4.	Grace Poe	Independent
Vice president	2.	Chiz Escudero	Independent
Senator	11.	Neri Colmenares	Makabayan
Senator	13.	Isko Moreno	PMP
Senator	17.	Sherwin Gatchalian	NPC
Senator	18.	Dick Gordon	Independent
Senator	22.	Lorna Kapunan	Aksyon
Senator	30.	Edu Manzano	Independent
Senator	34.	Susan Ople	Nacionalista
Senator	38.	Samuel Pagdilao	Independent
Senator	42.	Ralph Recto^	Liberal
Senator	44.	Roman Romulo	Independent
Senator	46.	Tito Sotto	NPC
Senator	50.	Migz Zubiri	Independent

^Guest candidate

Tapang at Malasakit
Position	#	Name	Party
President	3.	Rodrigo Duterte	PDP–Laban
Vice president	1.	Alan Peter Cayetano	Independent
Senator	None officially endorsed		

People's Reform Party
Position	#	Name	Party
President	2.	Miriam Defensor Santiago	PRP
Vice president	4.	Bongbong Marcos	Independent
Senator	13.	Isko Moreno*	PMP
Senator	30.	Edu Manzano*	Independent
Senator	34.	Susan Ople*	Nacionalista
Senator	36.	Manny Pacquiao*	UNA
Senator	41.	Jericho Petilla*	Liberal
Senator	42.	Ralph Recto*	Liberal
Senator	43.	Martin Romualdez	Lakas
Senator	45.	Dionisio Santiago	Independent
Senator	47.	Francis Tolentino	Independent
Senator	49.	Joel Villanueva*	Liberal

*Guest candidate

Partido ng Manggagawa at Magsasaka
Position	#	Name	Party
Senator	2.	Aldin Ali	LM
Senator	10.	Melchor Chavez	LM

Non-independents not in tickets
Position	#	Name	Party
Senator	9.	Sandra Cam	PMP
Senator	16.	Larry Gadon	KBL
Senator	29.	Romeo Maganto	Lakas

=== Independents ===
Independents not in tickets
Position	#	Name	Party
Vice president	6.	Antonio Trillanes	Independent
Senator	1.	Shariff Albani	Independent
Senator	3.	Raffy Alunan	Independent
Senator	5.	Godofredo Arquiza	Independent
Senator	6.	Levito Baligod	Independent
Senator	7.	Greco Belgica	Independent
Senator	8.	Walden Bello	Independent
Senator	14.	Ray Dorona	Independent
Senator	21.	Eid Kabalu	Independent
Senator	28.	Dante Liban	Independent
Senator	32.	Ramon Montaño	Independent
Senator	35.	Serge Osmeña	Independent
Senator	39.	Jovito Palparan	Independent
Senator	48.	Diosdado Valeroso	Independent

== Results ==
Rodrigo Duterte of PDP–Laban and Leni Robredo of the Liberal Party won the presidential and vice presidential elections, respectively. The Liberals also won a plurality of seats in both houses of Congress, but several of the Liberal Party members of the House of Representatives jumped ship to Duterte's PDP–Laban, allowing his party to create a supermajority coalition that put Pantaleon Alvarez into the Speakership. The Senate leadership was ultimately won by PDP–Laban's Koko Pimentel, with the Liberals ultimately comprising the minority bloc there. The election of Alvarez and Pimentel meant that PDP–Laban currently holds three of the four elected highest political offices, for the first time since 1986 when the Kilusang Bagong Lipunan held the offices of the presidency, vice presidency, parliamentary speaker and prime minister.

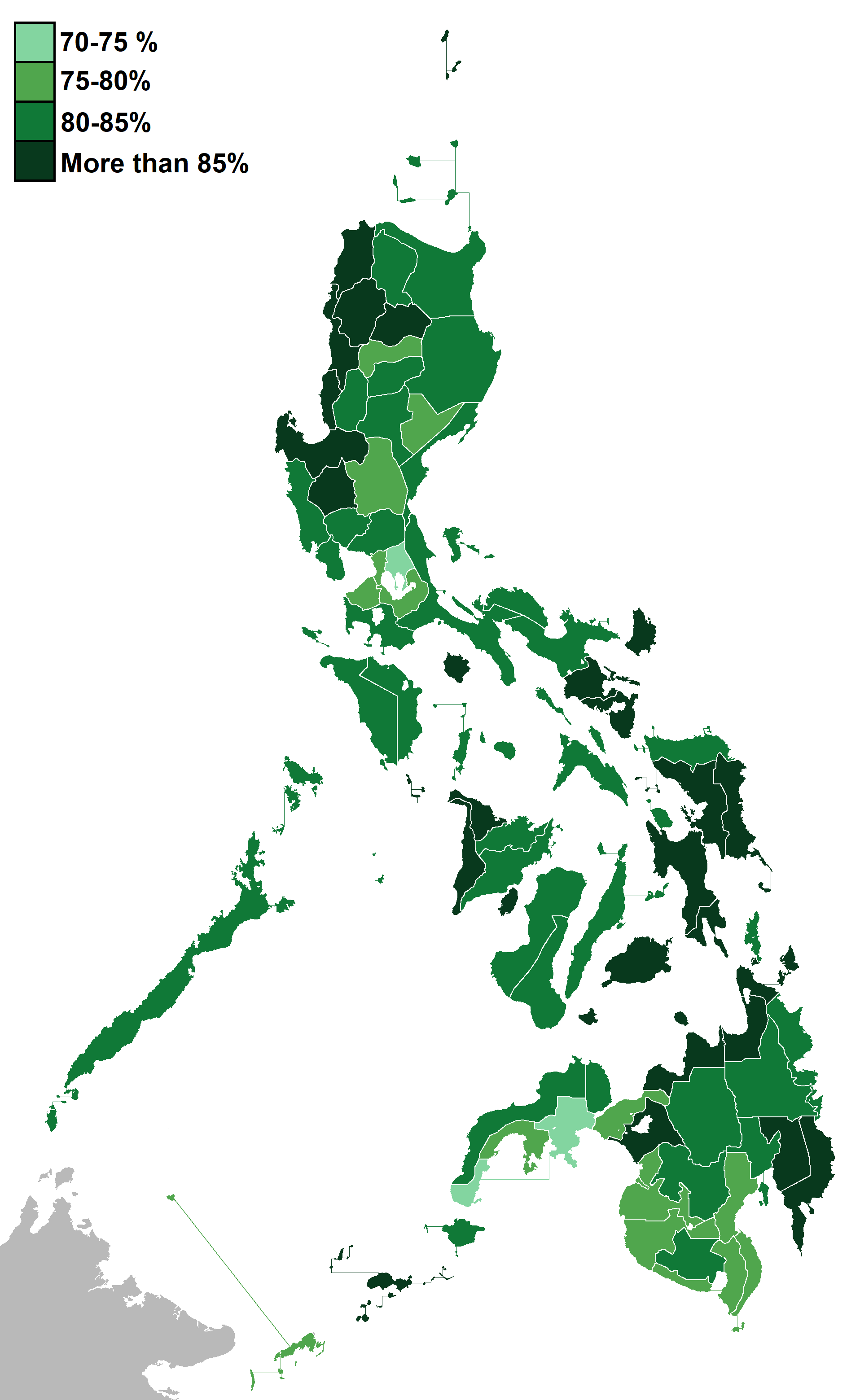
2016 Election Turnout

=== President ===
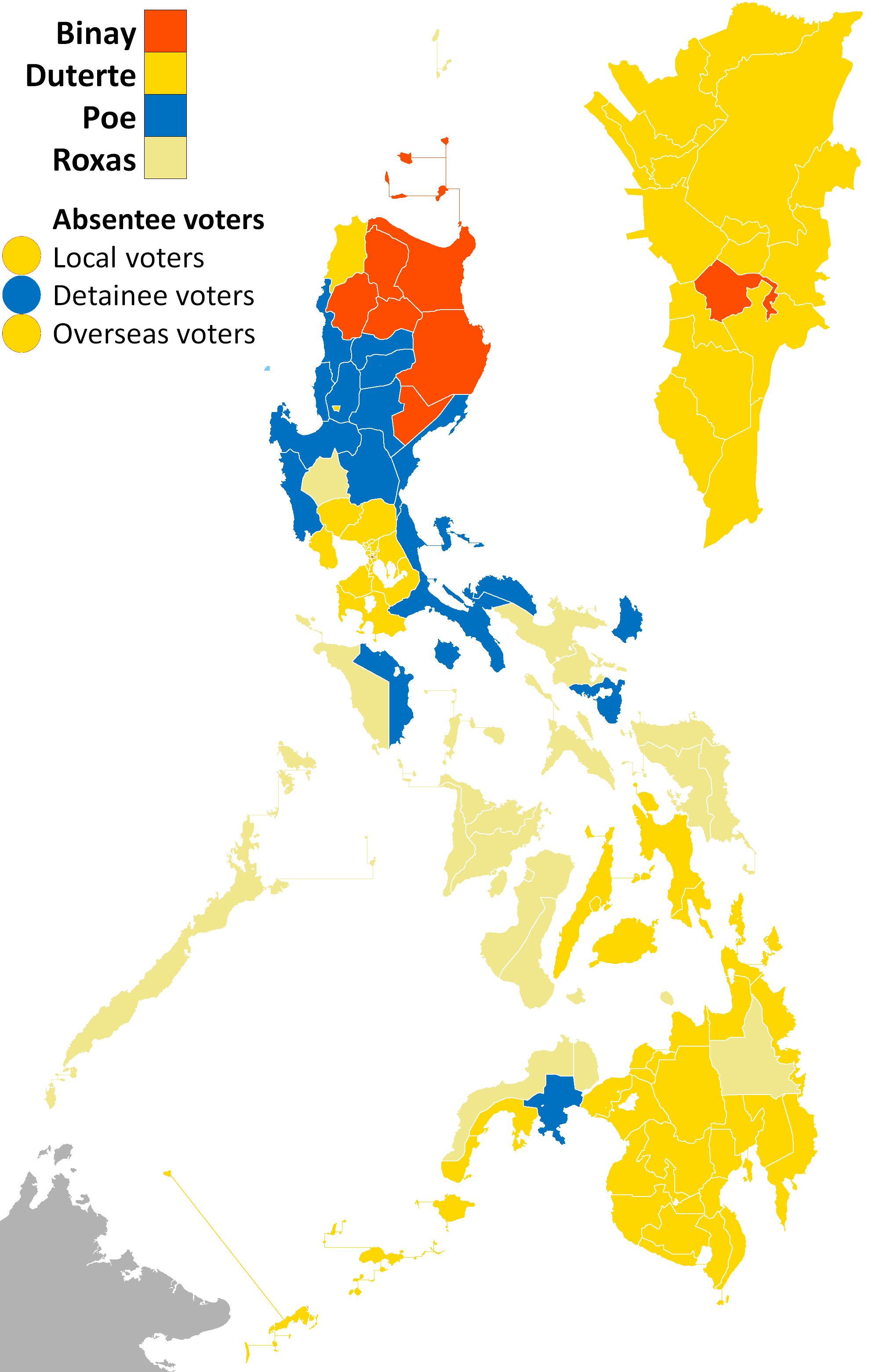
Results of the presidential election per province, denoting the provinces and cities won by each candidate.

The winner of the presidential election succeeded President Benigno Aquino III, who was term limited. A separate election was held to determine the Vice Presidency; Jejomar Binay could have defended the vice presidency, but ran for president instead. Both elections were under the plurality voting system.

Candidate	Party	Votes	%
Rodrigo Duterte	PDP–Laban	16,601,997	39.02
Mar Roxas	Liberal Party	9,978,175	23.45
Grace Poe	Independent	9,100,991	21.39
Jejomar Binay	United Nationalist Alliance	5,416,140	12.73
Miriam Defensor Santiago	People's Reform Party	1,455,532	3.42
Total		42,552,835	100.00
Valid votes		42,552,835	94.61
Invalid/blank votes (Note: Includes 25,779 votes for Roy Señeres (Partido ng Manggagawa at Magsasaka) who withdrew and died after the ballots were printed.)		2,426,316	5.39
Total votes		44,979,151	100.00
Registered voters/turnout		55,739,911	80.69
Source: Congress

=== Vice president ===
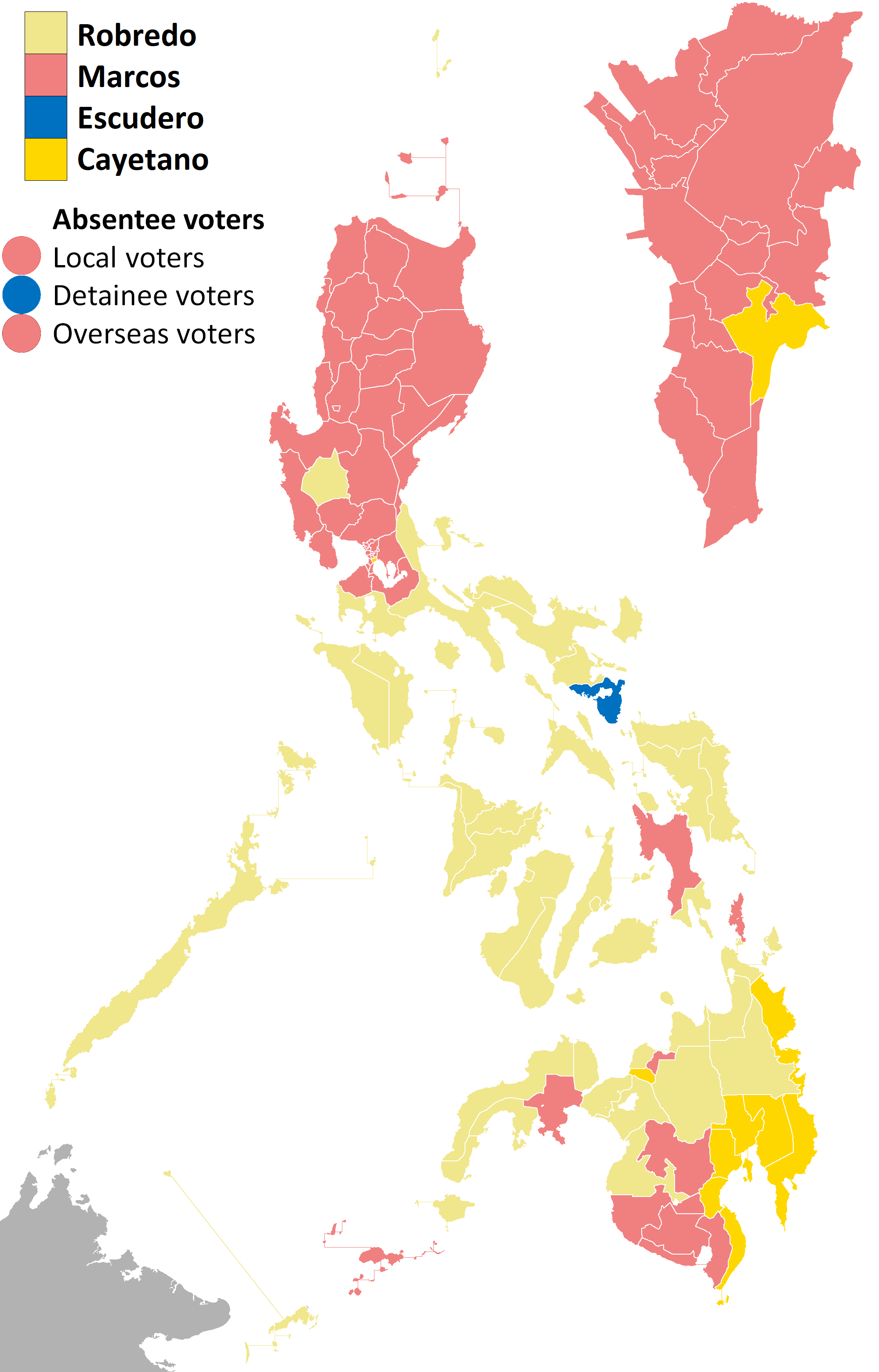
Results of the vice presidential election per province, denoting the provinces and cities won by each candidate.

Candidate	Party	Votes	%
Leni Robredo	Liberal Party	14,418,817	35.11
Bongbong Marcos (Note: Running mate of Miriam Defensor Santiago (People's Reform Party))	Independent (Note: Nacionalista Party member running as an independent)	14,155,344	34.47
Alan Peter Cayetano (Note: Running mate of Rodrigo Duterte (PDP–Laban))	Independent	5,903,379	14.38
Francis Escudero (Note: Running mate of Grace Poe (independent))	Independent	4,931,962	12.01
Antonio Trillanes (Note: Supporting Grace Poe (independent))	Independent	868,501	2.11
Gregorio Honasan	United Nationalist Alliance	788,881	1.92
Total		41,066,884	100.00
Valid votes		41,066,884	91.30
Invalid/blank votes		3,912,267	8.70
Total votes		44,979,151	100.00
Registered voters/turnout		55,739,911	80.69
Source: Congress

=== Congress ===
==== Senate ====
Composition of the Senate on June 30, 2016.

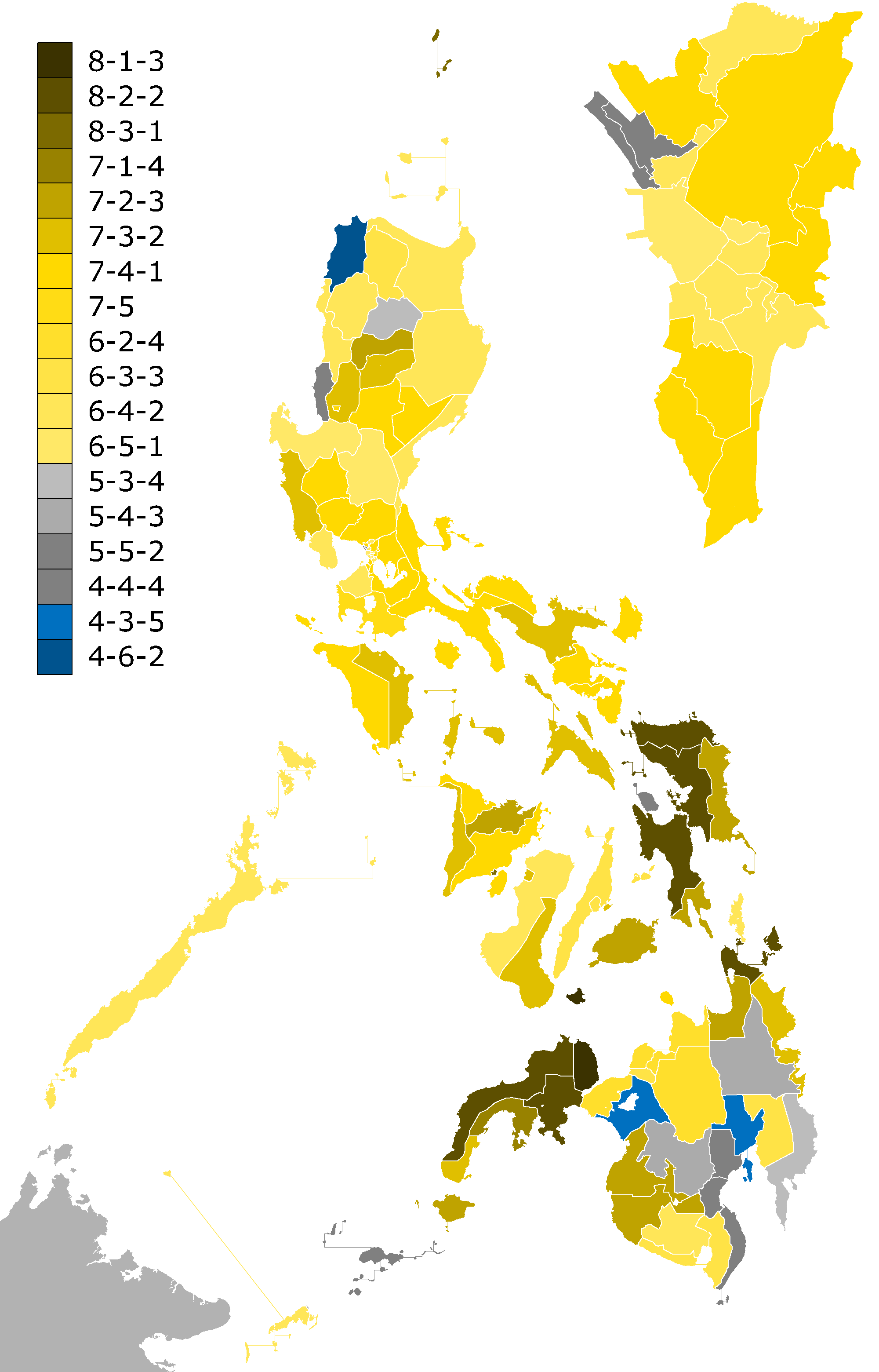
Provincial results of the Senate election, denoting which party won a plurality of votes per province; Metro Manila at the inset. Note that seats are allocated on the nationwide vote.

12 seats of the Senate of the Philippines were up for election. The Philippines uses plurality-at-large voting to determine the winning candidates. With the country as one at-large "district", the twelve candidates with the highest number of votes joined the winners of the 2013 election in the Senate.

Candidate	Party or alliance		Votes	%
Franklin Drilon	Koalisyon ng Daang Matuwid	Liberal Party	18,607,391	41.37
Joel Villanueva	Koalisyon ng Daang Matuwid (Note: Guest candidate of People's Reform Party)	Liberal Party	18,459,222	41.04
Tito Sotto	Partido Galing at Puso (Note: Guest candidate of United Nationalist Alliance)	Nationalist People's Coalition	17,200,371	38.24
Panfilo Lacson	Koalisyon ng Daang Matuwid	Independent	16,926,152	37.63
Dick Gordon	Partido Galing at Puso	Independent	16,719,322	37.17
Juan Miguel Zubiri	Partido Galing at Puso	Independent	16,119,165	35.84
Manny Pacquiao	United Nationalist Alliance		16,050,546	35.68
Kiko Pangilinan	Koalisyon ng Daang Matuwid	Liberal Party	15,955,949	35.47
Risa Hontiveros	Koalisyon ng Daang Matuwid	Akbayan	15,915,213	35.38
Sherwin Gatchalian	Partido Galing at Puso	Nationalist People's Coalition	14,953,768	33.25
Ralph Recto	Koalisyon ng Daang Matuwid (Note: Guest candidate of Partido Galing at Puso)	Liberal Party	14,271,868	31.73
Leila de Lima	Koalisyon ng Daang Matuwid	Liberal Party	14,144,070	31.45
Francis Tolentino	People's Reform Party	Independent	12,811,098	28.48
Serge Osmeña	Independent		12,670,615	28.17
Martin Romualdez	People's Reform Party	Lakas–CMD	12,325,824	27.40
Isko Moreno	Partido Galing at Puso	Pwersa ng Masang Pilipino	11,126,944	24.74
TG Guingona	Koalisyon ng Daang Matuwid	Liberal Party	10,331,157	22.97
Jericho Petilla	Koalisyon ng Daang Matuwid	Liberal Party	7,046,580	15.67
Mark Lapid	Koalisyon ng Daang Matuwid	Aksyon Demokratiko	6,594,190	14.66
Neri Colmenares	Partido Galing at Puso	Makabayan	6,484,985	14.42
Edu Manzano	Partido Galing at Puso	Independent	5,269,539	11.72
Roman Romulo	Partido Galing at Puso	Independent	4,824,484	10.73
Susan Ople	Partido Galing at Puso	Nacionalista Party	2,775,191	6.17
Alma Moreno	United Nationalist Alliance		2,432,224	5.41
Greco Belgica	Independent		2,100,985	4.67
Rafael Alunan III	Independent		2,032,362	4.52
Larry Gadon	Kilusang Bagong Lipunan		1,971,327	4.38
Rey Langit	United Nationalist Alliance		1,857,630	4.13
Lorna Kapunan	Partido Galing at Puso	Aksyon Demokratiko	1,838,978	4.09
Dionisio Santiago	People's Reform Party	Independent	1,828,305	4.06
Samuel Pagdilao	Partido Galing at Puso	Independent	1,755,949	3.90
Melchor Chavez	Partido ng Manggagawa at Magsasaka		1,736,822	3.86
Getulio Napeñas	United Nationalist Alliance		1,719,576	3.82
Ina Ambolodto	Koalisyon ng Daang Matuwid	Liberal Party	1,696,558	3.77
Allan Montaño	United Nationalist Alliance		1,605,073	3.57
Walden Bello	Independent		1,091,194	2.43
Jacel Kiram	United Nationalist Alliance		995,673	2.21
Shariff Ibrahim Albani	Independent		905,610	2.01
Jovito Palparan	Independent		855,297	1.90
Cresente Paez	Koalisyon ng Daang Matuwid	Independent	808,623	1.80
Sandra Cam	Pwersa ng Masang Pilipino		805,756	1.79
Dante Liban	Independent		782,249	1.74
Ramon Montaño	Independent		759,263	1.69
Aldin Ali	Partido ng Manggagawa at Magsasaka		733,838	1.63
Romeo Maganto	Lakas–CMD		731,021	1.63
Godofredo Arquiza	Independent		680,550	1.51
Levito Baligod	Independent		596,583	1.33
Diosdado Valeroso	Independent		527,146	1.17
Ray Dorona	Independent		495,191	1.10
Eid Kabalu	Independent		379,846	0.84
Total			321,307,273	100.00
Total votes			44,979,151	–
Registered voters/turnout			55,739,911	80.69
Source: COMELEC

==== House of Representatives ====
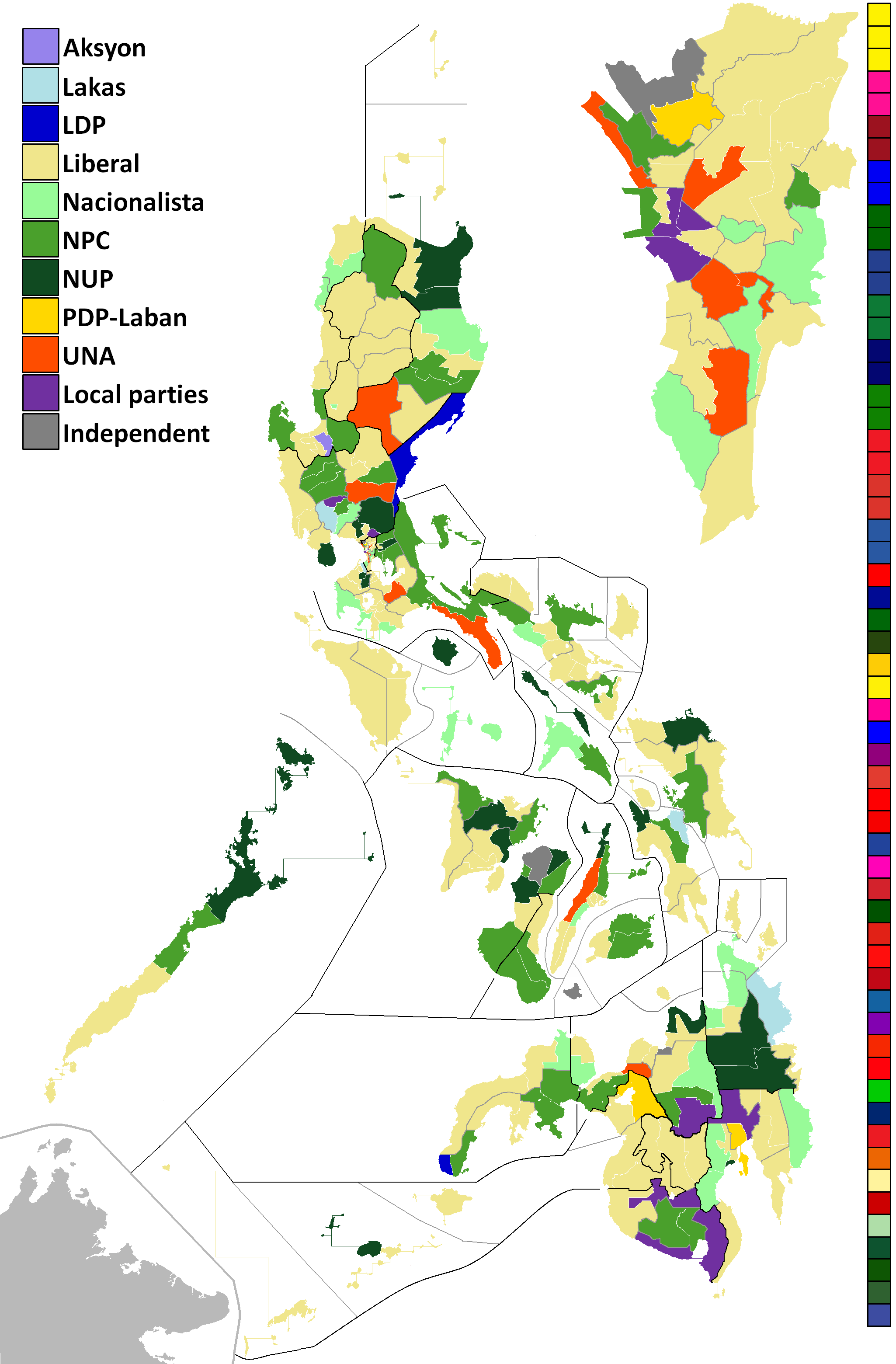
Results of the House of Representative elections. The map refers to congressional district results, with Metro Manila is denoted at the inset, and party-list election results, denoted by boxes to the right.

All seats of the House of Representatives were up for election. There are two types of representatives: the district representatives, 80% of the members, were elected in the different legislative districts via the plurality system; each district elected one representative. The party-list representatives were elected via closed lists, with the parties having at least 2% of the vote winning at least one seat, and no party winning more than three seats. If the winning candidates don't surpass 20% of the members, other parties that got less than 2% of the national vote will get one seat each until all party-lists have been filled up.

===== District elections =====
Party	Votes	%	+/–	Seats	+/–
Liberal Party	15,552,401	41.72	+4.16	115	+6
Nationalist People's Coalition	6,350,310	17.04	−0.04	42	0
National Unity Party	3,604,266	9.67	+1.12	23	−1
Nacionalista Party	3,512,975	9.42	+1.01	24	+6
United Nationalist Alliance	2,468,335	6.62	−4.55	11	+3
PDP–Laban	706,407	1.90	+0.90	3	New
Lakas–CMD	573,843	1.54	−3.70	4	−10
Aksyon Demokratiko	514,612	1.38	+1.03	1	New
Kilusang Bagong Lipunan	198,754	0.53	+0.19	0	−1
Asenso Manileño	184,602	0.50	New	2	New
Kusog Baryohanon	172,601	0.46	New	1	New
Partido Tinig ng Masa	145,417	0.39	New	1	New
People's Champ Movement	142,307	0.38	New	1	New
Bukidnon Paglaum	129,678	0.35	−0.01	1	0
Lingap Lugud	127,762	0.34	New	1	New
Padayon Pilipino	127,759	0.34	New	0	0
One Cebu	114,732	0.31	+0.23	0	0
Laban ng Demokratikong Pilipino	111,086	0.30	−0.02	2	0
Arangkada San Joseño	83,945	0.23	New	1	New
Pwersa ng Masang Pilipino	78,020	0.21	−0.30	0	0
Kabalikat ng Bayan sa Kaunlaran	72,130	0.19	−0.15	1	0
Hugpong sa Tawong Lungsod	53,186	0.14	−0.09	0	0
Sulong Zambales	52,415	0.14	−0.07	0	0
Centrist Democratic Party of the Philippines	13,662	0.04	−0.20	0	−1
Partido ng Manggagawa at Magsasaka	7,239	0.02	−0.02	0	0
Philippine Green Republican Party	4,426	0.01	New	0	0
Independent	2,172,562	5.83	−0.09	4	−2
Party-list seats				59	0
Total	37,275,432	100.00	–	297	+4
Valid votes	37,275,432	83.97	+13.95		
Invalid/blank votes	7,116,943	16.03	−13.95		
Total votes	44,392,375	100.00	–		
Registered voters/turnout	54,363,844	81.66	+4.48		
Source: COMELEC (Seats won), (Turnout and electorate)

===== Party-list election =====
Party	Votes	%	+/–	Seats	+/–
Ako Bicol Political Party	1,664,975	5.14	+2.38	3	+1
Gabriela Women's Party	1,367,795	4.22	+1.64	2	0
1-Pacman Party List	1,310,197	4.05	New	2	New
Alliance of Concerned Teachers	1,180,752	3.65	+2.00	2	+1
Senior Citizens Partylist	988,876	3.05	+0.60	2	0
Kabalikat ng Mamamayan	840,393	2.60	New	2	New
AGRI Partylist	833,821	2.58	+1.25	2	+1
PBA Partylist	780,309	2.41	+1.64	2	New
Buhay Party-List	760,912	2.35	−2.25	2	−1
Abono Partylist	732,060	2.26	−0.52	2	0
Anak Mindanao	706,689	2.18	+0.80	2	+1
Coop-NATCCO	671,699	2.07	−0.25	2	0
Akbayan	608,449	1.88	−1.12	1	−1
Bayan Muna	606,566	1.87	−1.58	1	−1
AGAP Partylist	593,748	1.83	−0.31	1	−1
An Waray (Note: An Waray was granted a second representative in 2013 without a proclamation from the Commission on Elections; the seat change refers to the de jure ruling, where An Waray is only entitled to one seat from 2013 and is unchanged in 2016, against the de facto 2 seats occupied by the party as the result of the 2013 election.)	590,895	1.82	−0.13	1	0
Citizens' Battle Against Corruption	555,760	1.72	−0.40	1	−1
AAMBIS-Owa Party List	495,483	1.53	+0.40	1	0
Kalinga Partylist	494,725	1.53	+0.18	1	0
A Teacher Partylist	475,488	1.47	−2.31	1	−1
You Against Corruption and Poverty	471,173	1.46	+0.13	1	0
Democratic Independent Workers Association	467,794	1.44	+0.21	1	0
Trade Union Congress Party	467,275	1.44	+0.11	1	0
Abang Lingkod	466,701	1.44	+0.50	1	0
LPG Marketers Association	466,103	1.44	+0.10	1	0
Alliance of Organizations Networks and Associations of the Philippines	434,856	1.34	New	1	New
SAGIP Partylist	397,064	1.23	+0.18	1	0
Butil Farmers Party	395,011	1.22	−0.37	1	0
Acts-Overseas Filipino Workers Coalition of Organizations	374,601	1.16	New	1	New
Anakpawis	367,376	1.13	−0.03	1	0
Ang Kabuhayan	348,533	1.08	New	1	New
Angkla: ang Partido ng Pilipinong Marino	337,245	1.04	−0.26	1	0
Ang Mata'y Alagaan	331,285	1.02	+0.14	1	New
1st Consumers Alliance for Rural Energy	329,627	1.02	−2.37	1	−1
Ang National Coalition of Indigenous Peoples Action Na!	318,257	0.98	+0.11	1	0
Arts Business and Science Professionals	301,457	0.93	−0.37	1	0
Kabataan	300,420	0.93	−0.31	1	0
Bagong Henerasyon	299,381	0.92	+0.24	1	New
Ating Aagapay Sentrong Samahan ng mga Obrero	294,281	0.91	+0.67	1	New
Serbisyo sa Bayan Party	280,465	0.87	New	1	New
Magdalo para sa Pilipino	279,356	0.86	−1.19	1	−1
Una ang Edukasyon	278,393	0.86	New	1	New
Manila Teachers Party-List	268,613	0.83	New	1	New
Kusug Tausug	247,487	0.76	New	1	New
Aangat Tayo	243,266	0.75	−0.00	1	New
Agbiag! Timpuyog Ilocano	240,723	0.74	−0.13	1	0
Ating Guro	237,566	0.73	−0.04	0	0
Association for Development Dedicated to Agriculture and Fisheries	226,751	0.70	New	0	0
Abyan Ilonggo	223,880	0.69	New	0	0
Alliance of Philippine Fishing Federations	220,599	0.68	New	0	0
Append	219,218	0.68	−0.18	0	−1
Ang Nars	218,593	0.68	−0.21	0	−1
Abakada Guro	216,405	0.67	−0.22	0	−1
Confederation of Savings and Loan Association	213,814	0.66	New	0	0
Tingog Sinirangan (Tinig ng Silangan)	210,552	0.65	New	0	0
Abante Mindanao	209,276	0.65	−1.04	0	−1
OFW Family Club	203,767	0.63	−2.09	0	−2
Alagaan Natin Ating Kalusugan	191,362	0.59	New	0	0
Alay Buhay Community Development Foundation	186,712	0.58	−0.57	0	−1
Abante Retirees Organization	166,138	0.51	−0.07	0	0
Ako ang Bisaya	162,547	0.50	New	0	0
Alliance of Volunteer Educators	157,792	0.49	−0.49	0	−1
Rebolusyong Alyansang Makabansa	153,743	0.47	New	0	0
Katipunan ng mga Guardians Brotherhood	148,869	0.46	New	0	0
Alyansa ng mga Grupong Haligi ng Agham at Teknolohiya para sa Mamamayan	140,661	0.43	−0.04	0	0
Anti-War/Anti Terror Mindanao Peace Movement	138,040	0.43	+0.28	0	0
Tanggol Maralita	136,555	0.42	New	0	0
Academicians Students and Educators Alliance	125,069	0.39	New	0	0
Allied Movement Employment Protection Assistance for Overseas Filipino Workers Access Center	121,086	0.37	New	0	0
Adikhaing Tinataguyod ng Kooperatiba	120,361	0.37	−0.60	0	−1
Kasangga sa Kaunlaran	120,042	0.37	−0.36	0	0
Ugnayan ng Maralita Laban sa Kahirapan	118,149	0.36	+0.20	0	0
Disabled/Pilipinos with Disabilities	118,043	0.36	New	0	0
Global Workers and Family Federation	117,552	0.36	New	0	0
Association of Laborers and Employees	112,052	0.35	−0.21	0	0
Cancer Alleviation Network on Care Education and Rehabilitation	109,965	0.34	New	0	0
ACT-CIS Partylist	109,300	0.34	−1.03	0	−1
Aagapay sa Matatanda	102,583	0.32	−0.57	0	−1
Marino Samahan ng mga Seaman	102,430	0.32	New	0	0
Isang Pangarap na Bahay sa Bagong Buhay ng Maralitang Kababayan	100,746	0.31	−0.11	0	0
Movement for Economic Transformation and Righteous Opportunities	94,515	0.29	New	0	0
PISTON Land Transportation Coalition	89,384	0.28	−0.36	0	0
Sanlakas	87,351	0.27	−0.04	0	0
TGP Partylist	87,009	0.27	New	0	0
Kaagapay ng Nagkakaisang Agilang Pilipinong Magsasaka / Kabuhayan at Kabahayan ng mga Magsasaka	79,178	0.24	New	0	0
Migrante Sectoral Party of Overseas Filipinos and their Families	76,523	0.24	+0.05	0	0
Association of Marine Officer and Ratings	68,226	0.21	New	0	0
Isang Alyansang Aalalay sa Pinoy Skilled Workers	65,459	0.20	−0.39	0	0
Sinag Tungo sa Kaunlaran	61,393	0.19	New	0	0
Akbay Kalusugan	56,809	0.18	New	0	0
One Advocacy for Health Progress and Opportunity	54,550	0.17	New	0	0
Ang Pro-Life	53,078	0.16	−0.31	0	0
Sandigan ng mga Manggagawa sa Konstruksyon	52,251	0.16	New	0	0
Tribal Communities Association of the Philippines	50,401	0.16	New	0	0
Union of Nationalist Democratic Filipino Organization	49,742	0.15	New	0	0
Central Luzon Alliance for Socialized Education	49,212	0.15	New	0	0
Tinderong Pinoy Party	46,942	0.14	New	0	0
Partido ng Bayan ang Bida	46,853	0.14	New	0	0
Kapatirang Magmamais ng Pilipinas	46,521	0.14	New	0	0
Guardians Brotherhood	46,182	0.14	New	0	0
Kaisahan ng mga Maliliit na Magsasaka	42,935	0.13	New	0	0
Partido ng Manggagawa	42,742	0.13	New	0	0
Kilos Mamamayan Ngayon Na	39,777	0.12	New	0	0
Federation of International Cable TV and Telecommunications Association of the Philippines	36,619	0.11	New	0	0
Anak Central Party	35,270	0.11	New	0	0
Barangay Natin	31,185	0.10	New	0	0
Ang Tao Muna at Bayan	30,147	0.09	New	0	0
Awareness of Keepers of the Environment	28,727	0.09	New	0	0
National Confederation of Tricycle Operators and Drivers Association of the Philippines	24,407	0.08	New	0	0
Alliance for National Urban Poor Organizations Assembly	18,793	0.06	New	0	0
Movement of Women for Change and Reform	17,040	0.05	New	0	0
1-Abilidad	16,805	0.05	−0.02	0	0
Mamamayan Tungo sa Maunlad na Pilipinas	9,200	0.03	−0.12	0	0
Construction Workers Solidarity	9,121	0.03	New	0	0
DUMPER Partylist	6,941	0.02	New	0	0
Total	32,377,841	100.00	–	59	0
Valid votes	32,377,841	71.98	+3.01		
Invalid/blank votes	12,602,521	28.02	−3.01		
Total votes	44,980,362	100.00	–		
Registered voters/turnout	55,739,911	80.70	+4.93		
Source: COMELEC

=== Local ===
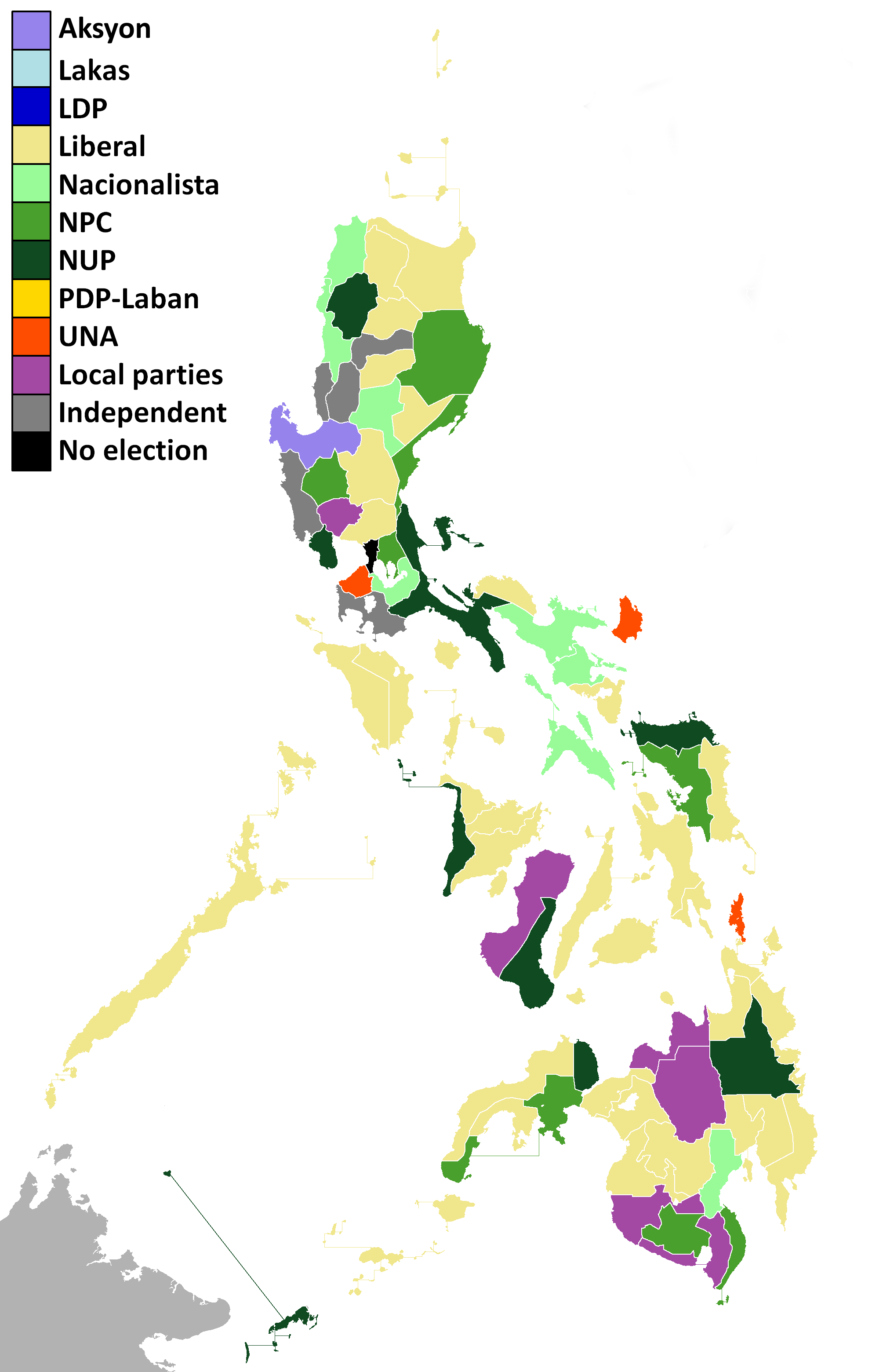
Gubernatorial elections result.

Local elections were held in all provinces, cities and municipalities. Executive posts were elected by the plurality system, while elections for the membership of the local legislatures were by plurality-at-large voting.

Each Sangguniang Panlalawigan (provincial board) has three ex officio members, while each Sangguniang Panlungsod (city council) and Sangguniang Bayan (municipal council) has two. The federation presidents each of Liga ng mga Barangay (barangay chairmen), Sangguniang Kabataan (youth council chairmen), and for Sangguniang Panlalawigan, the chapter presidents of the Sangguniang Bayan and Sangguniang Panlungsod (city and municipal councilors). The ex officio presiding officer of each local legislature is the chief executive's deputy, but that person only votes to break ties.

The federation presidents of the Liga ng mga Barangay and Sangguniang Kabataan were elected from the membership who won in the 2013 elections until December 2017, when they were replaced by appointees of the president, who voted among themselves who shall represent them. A barangay election, originally scheduled for October 2016, is postponed until 2018, to replace these appointees starting in December 2018.

Some legislatures have one reserved seat for indigenous peoples. These have three year terms, and selections are usually not synchronized with local and barangay elections. These are not included in the totals below.

Results summary
Party	Governor			Vice governor			Board members			Mayor			Vice-mayor			Councilors		
Party	Total	%	+/−	Total	%	+/−	Seats	%	+/−	Total	%	+/−	Total	%	+/−	Seats	%	+/−
Liberal	39	48.1%	+3	39	48.1%	+3	334	32.8%	+34	759	46.5%	+94	705	43.1%	+78	5,451	32.4%	+535
NPC	9	11.1%	−5	10	12.3%	−2	107	10.5%	−5	201	12.3%	−45	182	11.1%	−57	1,583	9.4%	−183
NUP	9	11.1%	+1	7	7.6%	+3	69	6.8%	−5	121	7.4%	−7	127	7.8%	−15	896	5.3%	−74
Nacionalista	9	11.1%	+2	6	7.4%	−5	64	6.3%	−38	145	8.9%	−14	139	8.5%	−27	1,047	6.3%	−325
UNA	3	3.7%	−1	5	6.2%	0	47	4.6%	+3	134	8.2%	+5	142	8.7%	+12	1,223	7.3%	+213
Aksyon	1	1.2%	+1	1	1.2%	+1	4	0.4%	+3	13	0.8%	+5	19	1.1%	+14	113	0.7%	+85
PDP–Laban	0	0.0%	−1	2	2.5%	+2	6	0.6%	+2	40	2.4%	+19	33	2.0%	+16	191	1.1%	+59
Lakas	0	0.0%	0	2	2.5%	0	4	0.4%	−14	8	0.5%	−33	9	0.6%	−33	64	0.4%	−259
Other parties	6	7.4%	+3	2	2.5%	+1	71	7.0%	−17	197	12.1%	+67	122	7.5%	+12	1,095	6.5%	+136
Independent	5	6.2%	−1	6	6.4%	−1	65	6.4%	+8	107	6.5%	+17	158	9.7%	−3	1,877	11.1%	−76
Ex officio members	—N/a						243	23.8%	+3	—N/a						3,268	19.4%	+14
Totals	81	100%	+1	81	100%	+1	1,019	100%	+13	1,634	100%	+7	1,634	100%	+7	16,808	100%	+95

== See also ==
- Presidential transition of Rodrigo Duterte
- Philippine barangay and Sangguniang Kabataan election, 2018, originally scheduled to be held in 2016, but was postponed twice to 2018.
