= El Renacimiento =

Former Spanish–Tagalog bilingual newspaper

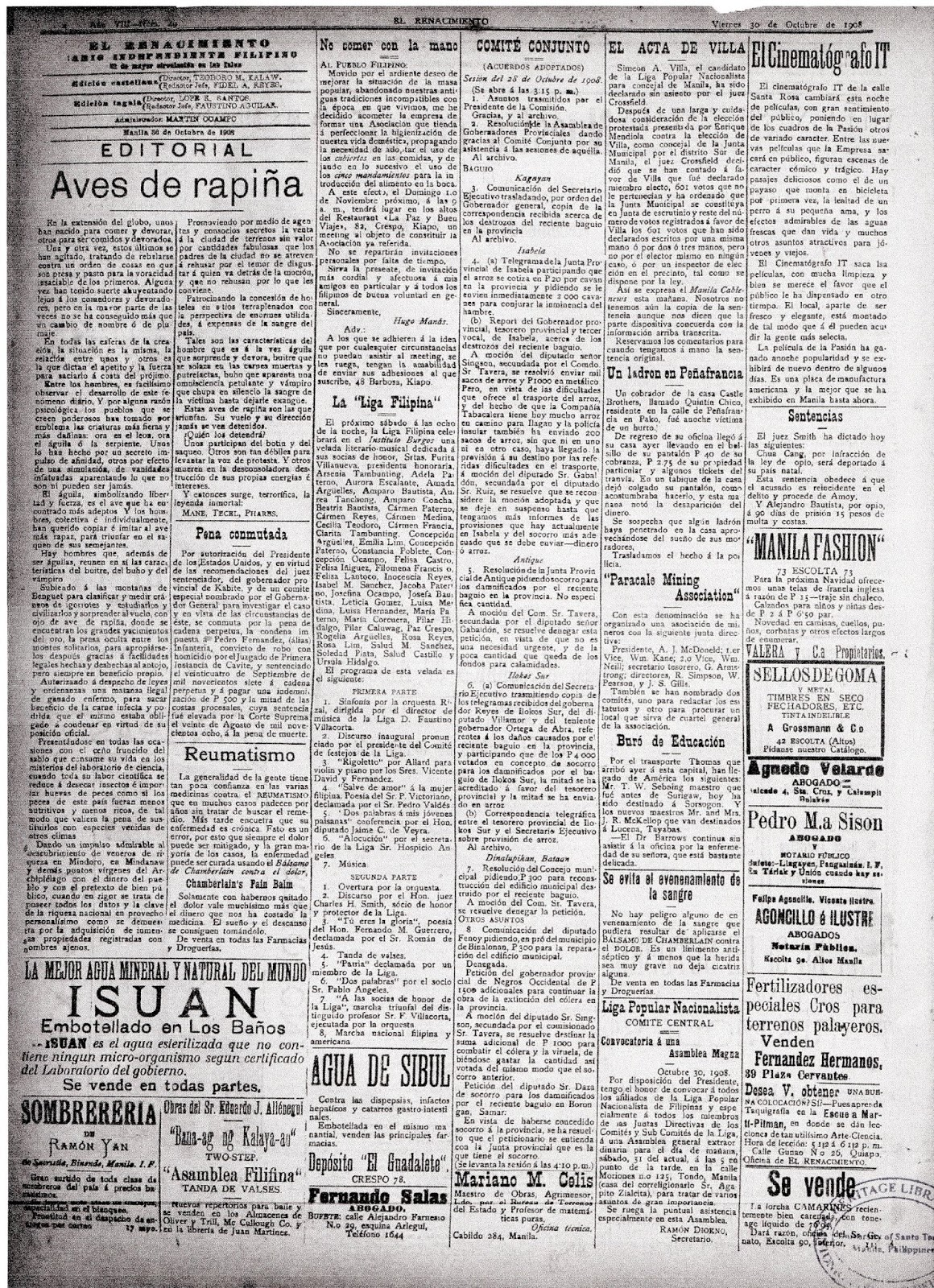
- Scan of Page 4 of the Year 8, Number 49 issue of the newspaper containing the infamous editorial "Aves de rapiña"
- Type: Daily (except Sunday)
- Founded: 1901
- Political alignment: Independent
- Language: Spanish / Tagalog
- Ceased publication: 1910
- Headquarters: 26 (Now ~340) Gunaw Street, Quiapo

El Renacimiento (lit. 'The Renaissance') was a Spanish–Tagalog bilingual language newspaper. Spanish articles were published under El Renacimiento, while Tagalog articles were published under Muling Pagsilang. It was printed in Manila until the 1940s by the members of the Guerrero de Ermita family.

It was founded as a response to the signing of the Treaty of Paris, which derailed the Philippines' struggle for sovereignty. It featured articles criticizing the United States' governance of the Philippines, including the policies of former U.S. President William Howard Taft.

The paper's publisher, Martin Ocampo, re-established it as the Spanish newspaper La Vanguardia and its Filipino edition Taliba on February 9, 1910 and February 19, 1910, respectively.

== Aves de rapiña ==
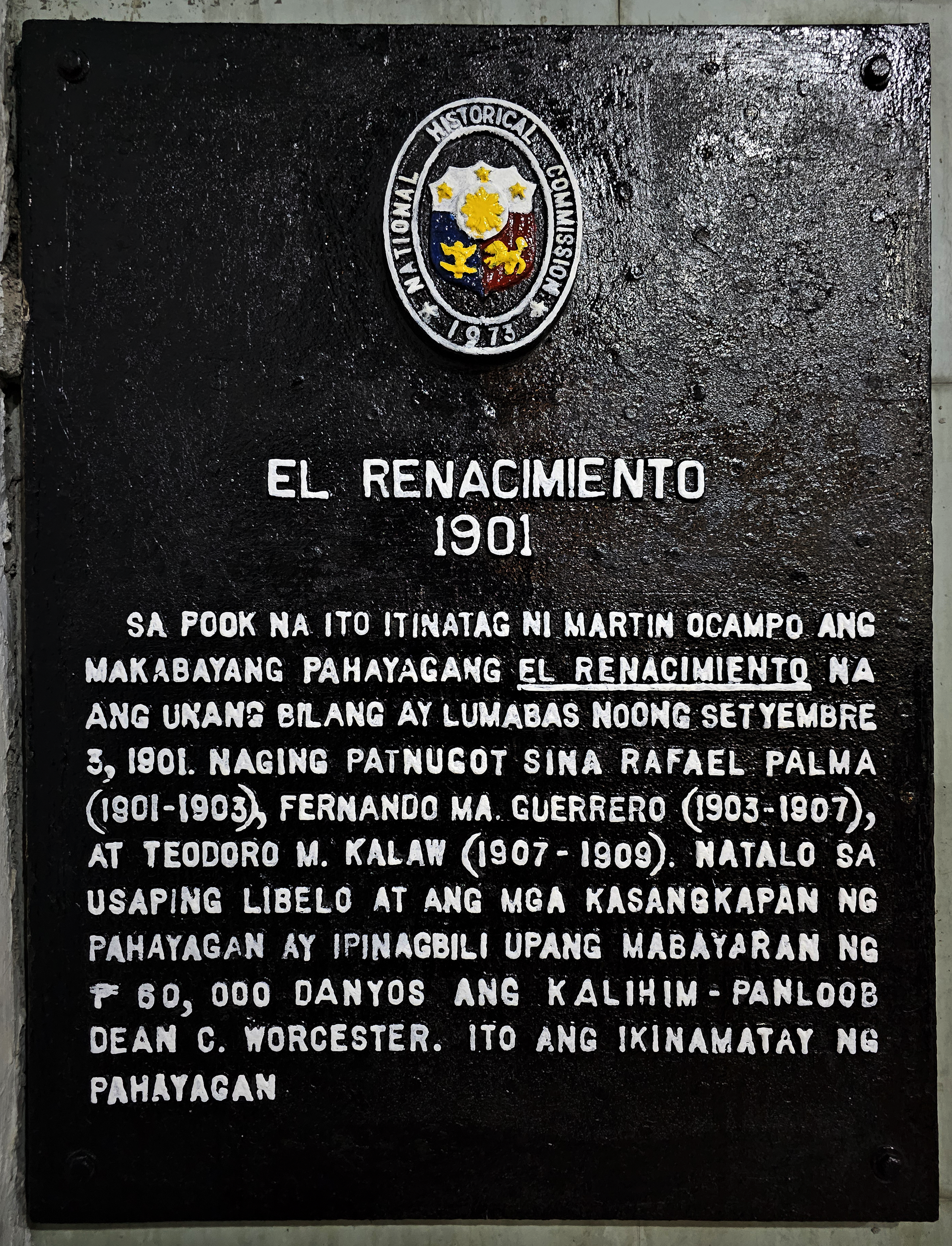
Historical marker installed in Quiapo, Manila to commemorate the newspaper

Tagalog-language Muling Pagsilang logo

On October 30, 1908, El Renacimiento published a Spanish-language editorial entitled "Aves de rapiña" ("Bird of prey"), which dealt with corruption in the colonial government.

On January 23, 1909, the newspaper was sued for libel by Dean Conant Worcester, then-secretary of the interior of the Insular Government of the Philippines. Worcester felt he was alluded to by the description of someone who had "the characteristics of the vulture, the owl and the vampire." According to historian Ambeth Ocampo, Worcester allegedly used his position as interior secretary to profit from the sale of diseased beef. He was also alleged to have profited from overpriced hotel concessions on government land.

Worcester's lawsuit pushed the paper towards bankruptcy and subsequent closure. Kalaw and Ocampo were sentenced to prison. The majority of the remaining editorial staff were absolved of their sentences after a series of appeals from 1910 to 1912. However, Kalaw and Ocampo were given pardons in 1914 by Governor-General Francis Burton Harrison.

The essay has become part of the required reading list in Philippine colleges. El Renacimiento is remembered as an anti-colonial publication that fought for press freedom during the American colonial period.

== Known staff ==
- Martin Ocampo – Founder, Publisher
- Rafael Palma – Founder, Director (1901–1903) (Note: Years active are according to the historical marker of El Renacimiento placed by the National Historical Commission of the Philippines. The marker description uses the title patnugot, which can be translated as either editor or director.)
- Fernando Ma. Guerrero – Director (1903–1907)
- Teodoro M. Kalaw – Director (1907–1909)
- Lope K. Santos – Director for Muling Pagsilang
- Fidel A. Reyes – Chief Editor (c. 1908) (Note: During the libel case, Reyes was identified as the chief editor, or redactor jefe at the time "Aves de Rapiña" was published.)
- Faustino Aguilar – Chief Editor
- Wenceslao Retana – Editor
- Javier Gomez de la Serna
- Dominador Gomez – Editor
- Isabelo de los Reyes – Editor
- Felipe Calderon – Editor
