= Jericho Petilla =

Filipino politician

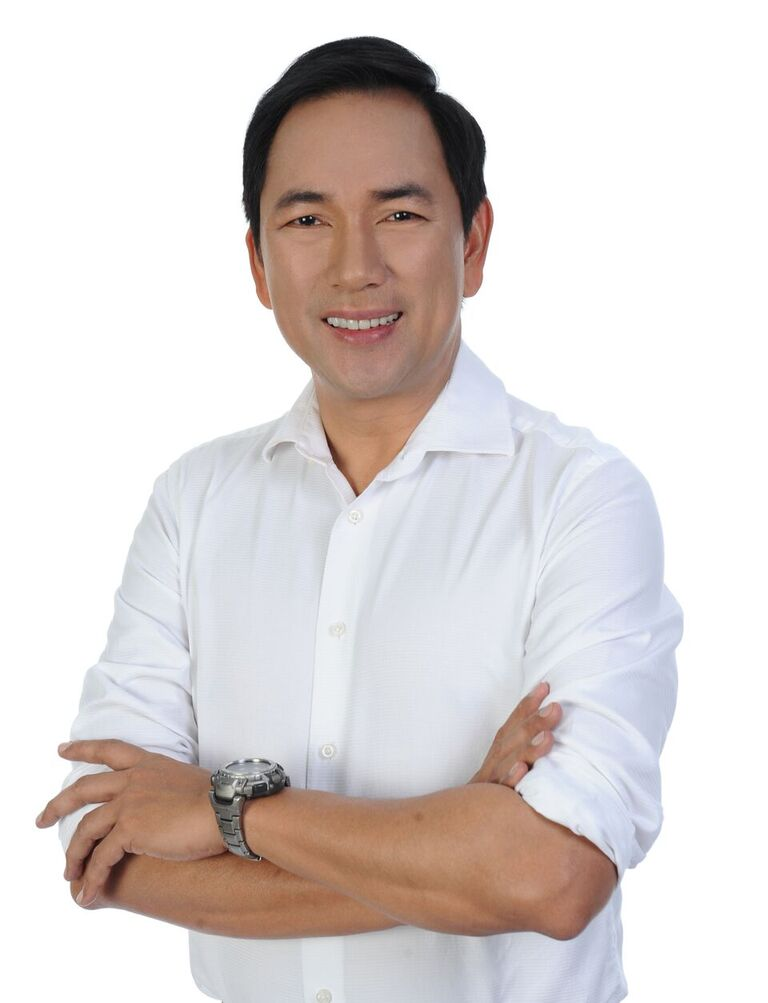

Governor of Leyte
- Incumbent
- Assumed office June 30, 2022
- Vice Governor: Leonardo Javier Jr.
- Preceded by: Leopoldo Petilla
- In office June 30, 2004 – November 4, 2012
- Vice Governor: Maria Mimietta Bagulaya
- Preceded by: Remedios Petilla
- Succeeded by: Maria Mimietta Bagulaya

12th Secretary of Energy
- In office November 5, 2012 – April 30, 2015
- President: Benigno Aquino III
- Preceded by: Jose Rene Almendras
- Succeeded by: Zenaida Monsada

Personal details
- Born: Carlos Jericho Loreto Petilla; April 29, 1963 (age 63) Tacloban, Leyte, Philippines
- Party: NPC (2004–2007; 2024–present)
- Other political affiliations: PDP (2017–2024); Liberal (2012–2017); Lakas (2007–2012)
- Spouse: Frances Ann Regis Basilio
- Children: 5
- Education: Ateneo de Manila University (BS)
- Website: Official website

Carlos Jericho "Icot" Loreto Petilla (born April 29, 1963) is a Filipino politician. He ran as a senator under the Liberal Party during the 2016 Philippine general election. A former Secretary of Energy during the administration of Benigno Aquino III, he is currently serving as Governor of Leyte since 2022 and previously from 2004 to 2012.

== Early life ==
Petilla was born on April 29, 1963, the son of politicians Leopoldo Petilla and Remedios Loreto. He finished his Bachelor of Science in Management Engineering at the Ateneo de Manila University, the same school he attended during his high school days. After finishing college, Petilla became a college instructor and taught Computer programming subjects in Ateneo de Manila University for five years. He also became an IT consultant to various multinational companies.

His business interests included the IDCSI (International Data Conversion Solution Inc.) based in Mandaluyong, and FPOSI (Freight Process Outsourcing Solutions Inc) based in Palo, Leyte, where he is both president and chief executive officer (CEO). He is also the part-owner and consultant of DDC (Direct Data Capture) with business offices in the United Kingdom and New York, and Datahold in London.

== Political career ==
In the 2004 Philippine general election, he divested his shares in his private investments to make a bid for governor of Leyte. He won during that year's election, defeating Sergio Apostol, a three-term congressman and then Presidential Legal Adviser.

His first 100 days in office saw the drafting of the Implementing Rules and Regulations of the Leyte Provincial Investment Code of 2004. The code aims to encourage investors to locate in Leyte with the salient feature of getting a 100% real property tax holiday for 5 years.

Petilla also supported the Philippine Economic Zone Authority (PEZA) in approving the application of the Provincial Government of Leyte to convert the 6.9 hectares lot at Barangay Pawing, Palo, Leyte, where the developed Leyte Academic Center is located, into the Leyte Information Communication Technology (ICOT) Park.

=== 2007 elections ===
Petilla accepted the nomination of the ruling party Lakas–CMD as one of its candidates for Senator under TEAM Unity in the 2007 Senate election. However, only days after he filed his candidacy, he withdrew his name from the coalition, with Boholano actor Cesar Montano acting as his replacement in the slate.

=== 2016 elections ===
In June 2015, he stepped down as Secretary of Energy to prepare for a senatorial bid. He ran for senator under the Koalisyon ng Daang Matuwid led by the Liberal Party (LP). His campaign centered on three major advocacies: energy, education and health. He failed to win a Senate seat, placing 18th out of 50 candidates with around 6.3 million votes.

== Personal life ==
Petilla is the son of former Leyte governors Leopoldo E. Petilla (1992–1995) and Remedios "Matin" Loreto-Petilla (1995–2004). He is married to Frances Ann Basilio, former mayor of Palo, Leyte from 2019 until 2022, and they have five children. His brother Leopoldo Dominico, also known as "Mic", was governor from 2013 until 2022.

== Electoral history ==
Electoral history of Jericho Petilla
Year	Office	Party	Votes received				Result
Year	Office	Party	Total	%	P.	Swing	Result
2004	Governor of Leyte	NPC	257,609	52.76%	1st	—N/a	Won
2007	Governor of Leyte	Lakas–CMD	317,241	95.68%	1st	+42.92	Won
2010	Governor of Leyte	Lakas–Kampi	445,104	100%	1st	+4.32	Unopposed
2022	Governor of Leyte	PDP–Laban	547,109	82.23%	1st	-17.77	Won
2025	Governor of Leyte	NPC	661,299	94.98%	1st	+12.75	Won
2016	Senator of the Philippines	Liberal	7,046,580	15.67%	18th	—N/a	Lost

Political offices
Preceded by Leopoldo Petilla	Governor of Leyte; 2022–present 2004–2012	Incumbent
Preceded by Remedios Petilla	Governor of Leyte; 2022–present 2004–2012	Succeeded by Ma. Mimietta Bagulaya
Preceded by Jose Rene Almendras	Secretary of the Philippine Department of Energy; 2012–2015	Succeeded by Zenaida Monsada
