= Opinion polling for the 2019 Philippine Senate election =

These are the opinion polls conducted to measure preferences in the 2019 Philippine Senate election.

== Polls ==
SWS and Pulse Asia

Rank	Pulse Asia	Pulse Asia	Pulse Asia	Pulse Asia	Pulse Asia	Pulse Asia	Pulse Asia
Survey dates	March 23–28, 2018	June 15–21, 2018	September 1–7, 2018	December 14–21, 2018	February 24–28, 2019	April 10–14, 2019	May 3–6, 2019
Sample size	1,200	1,200	1,800	1,800	1,800	1,800	1,800
Margin of error	±3.0%	±3.0%	±2.3%	±2.3%	±2.3%	±2.3%	±2.3%
None / refused / undecided	5.8%	4.8%	3.6%	4.9%	3.7%	5.2%	5.8%

Name	Party	2018						2019		
Name	Party	Mar 23–28	Jun 15–21	Sep 1–7	Sep 15–23	Sep 15–23	Dec 14–21	Feb 24–28	Apr 10–14	May 3–6
Name	Party	Pulse	Pulse	Pulse	SWS	SWS	Pulse	Pulse	Pulse	Pulse
Vangie Abejo	Independent	—	—	—	—	—	0.3%	0.2%	0.9%	0.9%
Persida Acosta	Independent	12.8%	—	—	—	—	—	—	—	—
Abner Afuang	PMM	—	—	—	—	—	0.7%	1.3%	2.3%	1.0%
Freddie Aguilar	Independent	—	9.3%	8.9%	7%	—	9.6%	7.3%	11.6%	8.2%
Vitaliano Aguirre	Independent	6.2%	—	—	—	—	—	—	—	—
Shariff Albani	PMM	—	—	—	—	—	0.8%	2.1%	0.9%	1.3%
Gary Alejano	Liberal	2.1%	1.6%	1.6%	3%	4%	2.8%	3.0%	5.0%	6.2%
Richard Alfajora	Independent	—	—	—	—	—	0.1%	0.3%	2.1%	1.0%
Rafael Alunan III	Bagumbayan–VNP	1.8%	2.0%	1.8%	3%	—	3.0%	2.0%	2.3%	3.5%
Pads Amir-Hussin	Independent	—	—	—	—	—	1.2%	—	—	—
Martin Andanar	PDP–Laban	8.4%	—	—	—	—	—	—	—	—
Sonny Angara	LDP	44.9%	41.9%	37.1%	26%	26%	58.5%	52.2%	40.4%	36.3%
Bam Aquino	Liberal	30.5%	32.1%	20.1%	22%	22%	32.6%	30.4%	28.8%	30.6%
Kris Aquino	Independent	—	—	17.7%	—	—	—	—	—	—
Gerald Arcega	PMM	—	—	—	—	—	1.2%	0.1%	1.2%	0.6%
Ernesto Arellano	Independent	—	—	—	—	—	2.3%	1.2%	2.5%	2.1%
Marcelino Arias	PMM	—	—	—	—	—	1.1%	1.0%	1.5%	0.9%
Hussayin Arpa	Independent	—	—	—	—	—	0.2%	—	—	—
Gloria Macapagal Arroyo	PDP–Laban	—	10.8%	11.9%	10%	—	—	—	—	—
Bernard Austria	PDSP	—	—	—	—	—	1.1%	0.3%	1.7%	0.6%
Vince Avena	KDP	—	—	—	—	—	0.7%	—	—	—
Teddy Baguilat	Liberal	1.2%	1.7%	0.5%	—	—	—	—	—	—
Jonathan Baldevarona	Independent	—	—	—	—	—	—	0.2%	0.5%	0.6%
Ace Barbers	PDP–Laban	—	—	6.2%	—	—	—	—	—	—
Herbert Bautista	NPC	26.2%	28.5%	20.9%	16%	—	—	—	—	—
Greco Belgica	PDP–Laban	0.9%	1.5%	1.0%	2%	—	—	—	—	—
Walden Bello	Akbayan	0.9%	1.5%	2.8%	—	—	—	—	—	—
Albee Benitez	PDP–Laban	3.7%	3.6%	2.0%	2%	—	—	—	—	—
Nancy Binay	UNA	45.8%	37.1%	50.6%	31%	26%	46.7%	40.5%	36.2%	32.8%
Jesus Caceres	Independent	—	—	—	—	—	0.1%	0.1%	0.3%	0.6%
Toti Casiño	KDP	—	—	—	—	—	1.8%	0.2%	2.7%	1.6%
Pia Cayetano	Nacionalista	53.8%	55.7%	54.4%	37%	43%	55.4%	47.0%	43.9%	45.0%
Melchor Chavez	PMM	—	—	—	—	—	4.0%	3.0%	2.0%	1.6%
Glenn Chong	KDP	—	—	—	—	—	—	3.5%	2.2%	4.1%
Neri Colmenares	Makabayan	7.0%	7.1%	7.8%	3%	—	9.3%	9.7%	10.9%	7.5%
Dakila Cua	PDP–Laban	—	—	0.7%	—	—	—	—	—	—
Alfonso Cusi	PDP–Laban	0.4%	—	—	—	—	—	—	—	—
Manny Dadulla	KDP	—	—	—	—	—	1.2%	—	—	—
Dingdong Dantes	Independent	16.8%	—	—	—	—	—	—	—	—
Leody de Guzman	PLM	—	—	—	—	—	1.4%	1.2%	1.9%	1.0%
Bato dela Rosa	PDP–Laban	33.1%	37.7%	27.0%	19%	25%	35.7%	44.6%	36.7%	37.9%
Monsour del Rosario	PDP–Laban	—	—	3.7%	—	—	—	—	—	—
Chel Diokno	Liberal	—	3.2%	1.6%	—	3%	3.4%	6.9%	5.3%	6.6%
Sara Duterte	PDP–Laban	43.8%	46.2%	39.5%	24%	—	—	—	—	—
JV Ejercito	NPC	29.0%	35.6%	26.7%	19%	19%	33.6%	27.6%	28.1%	31.2%
Juan Ponce Enrile	PMP	—	—	—	—	—	19.0%	25.2%	17.6%	16.3%
Agnes Escudero	Independent	—	—	—	—	—	9.5%	6.6%	6.5%	4.4%
Jinggoy Estrada	PMP	32.8%	37.9%	34.6%	29%	31%	36.3%	33.9%	28.8%	30.8%
Nicanor Faeldon	PDP–Laban	1.5%	—	—	—	—	—	—	—	—
Ted Failon	Independent	25.6%	25.8%	21.9%	—	—	—	—	—	—
Rodolfo Fariñas	PDP–Laban	5.7%	4.7%	3.1%	—	—	—	—	—	—
Elmer Francisco	PFP	—	—	—	—	—	1.2%	0.2%	0.9%	1.2%
Edmundo Fuerte	Independent	—	—	—	—	—	0.3%	—	—	—
Charlie Gaddi	Independent	—	—	—	—	—	0.3%	0.01%	0.4%	0.3%
Larry Gadon	KBL	2.3%	—	1.8%	—	3%	3.3%	3.8%	7.7%	4.6%
Gwendolyn Garcia	PDP–Laban	6.7%	—	—	—	—	—	—	—	—
Rex Gatchalian	NPC	16.7%	11.2%	13.3%	6%	—	—	—	—	—
Ding Generoso	Independent	—	—	—	—	—	1.1%	0.3%	0.7%	0.7%
Bong Go	PDP–Laban	5.9%	9.9%	14.1%	10%	12%	29.7%	53.0%	40.8%	42.0%
Junbert Guigayuma	PMM	—	—	—	—	—	0.2%	0.0%	1.1%	0.6%
TG Guingona	Liberal	17.5%	23.3%	17.3%	12%	—	—	—	—	—
Barry Gutierrez	Akbayan	—	1.7%	0.9%	—	—	—	—	—	—
Samira Gutoc-Tomawis	Liberal	—	—	—	—	—	1.3%	4.4%	5.9%	6.3%
Florin Hilbay	Aksyon	—	0.1%	0.2%	—	—	0.4%	0.9%	3.2%	3.2%
Rose Imperial	KDP	—	—	—	—	—	1.3%	—	—	—
Agot Isidro	Independent	—	9.4%	6.6%	7%	9%	—	—	—	—
Abraham Jangao	Independent	—	—	—	—	—	0.6%	0.1%	1.3%	1.6%
RJ Javellana	KDP	—	—	—	—	—	—	0.7%	0.5%	0.9%
Josefa Javelona	Independent	—	—	—	—	—	0.2%	—	—	—
Dante Jimenez	Independent	1.4%	2.2%	1.1%	—	—	—	—	—	—
Lorna Kapunan	Aksyon	3.2%	—	—	—	—	—	—	—	—
Lito Lapid	NPC	33.8%	36.2%	32.2%	30%	33%	49.8%	49.0%	45.7%	38.5%
Gregorio Larrazabal	Independent	—	0.5%	0.3%	—	—		—	—	—
Joey Lina	Independent	—	3.8%	3.8%	2%	—	—	—	—	—
Gina Lopez	Independent	14.0%	—	17.1%	—	—	—	—	—	—
Romulo Macalintal	Independent	—	—	1.3%	—	—	2.1%	5.7%	5.2%	7.0%
Emily Mallillin	Independent	—	—	—	—	—	0.3%	0.1%	0.3%	0.7%
Guiling Mamondiong	PDP–Laban	0.4%	—	—	—	—	—	—	—	—
Maria Socorro Manahan	PFP	—	—	—	—	—	1.1%	—	—	—
Faisal Mangondato	Independent	—	—	—	—	—	1.3%	3.4%	3.5%	6.2%
Dong Mangudadatu	PDP–Laban	—	3.2%	2.2%	3%	—	5.5%	12.5%	11.0%	15.5%
Jiggy Manicad	Independent	—	3.3%	4.7%	4%	6%	7.0%	11.9%	10.6%	10.3%
Imee Marcos	Nacionalista	32.2%	29.9%	32.6%	22%	24%	36.7%	36.0%	29.6%	34.1%
Rafael V. Mariano	Anakpawis	1.3%	1.2%	—	—	—	—	—	—	—
Jose Sonny Matula	PMM	—	—	—	—	—	0.3%	0.2%	0.2%	1.4%
Luther Meniano	PMM	—	—	—	—	—	0.2%	0.002%	0.1%	0.6%
Allan Montaño	Independent	—	—	—	—	—	—	1.8%	2.5%	2.2%
Isko Moreno	NUP	13.9%	15.5%	10.4%	—	—	—	—	—	—
Vivian Moreño	Akbayan	—	—	—	—	—	1.1%	—	—	—
Joan Sheelah Nalliw	Independent	—	—	—	—	—	0.0%	0.1%	0.2%	0.5%
Leah Navarro	Liberal	—	2.5%	1.5%	—	—	—	—	—	—
Karlo Nograles	PDP–Laban	10.6%	8.4%	9.0%	4%	—	—	—	—	—
Willie Ong	Lakas–CMD	—	6.6%	4.6%	—	—	6.8%	9.1%	10.5%	8.1%
Sergio Osmeña III	Independent	38.0%	36.6%	29.8%	19%	24%	38.8%	26.7%	24.6%	23.3%
Dado Padilla	PFP	—	—	—	—	—	3.4%	2.9%	2.5%	2.9%
Robin Padilla	PDP–Laban	26.2%	28.2%	27.4%	19%	—	—	—	—	—
Salvador Panelo	KBL	1.8%	—	—	—	—	—	—	—	—
Jim Paredes	Independent	—	3.2%	1.1%	2%	—	—	—	—	—
Prospero Pichay Jr.	Lakas–CMD	8.0%	4.3%	5.9%	—	—	—	—	—	—
Aquilino Pimentel III	PDP–Laban	39.8%	37.7%	32.4%	30%	33%	45.5%	35.6%	31.8%	31.7%
Grace Poe	Independent	70.8%	67.4%	70.1%	52%	43%	75.6%	67.5%	50.5%	47.7%
Manolo Quezon	Independent	—	2.5%	1.4%	—	—	—	—	—	—
Miro Quimbo	Liberal	—	—	0.8%	—	—	—	—	—	—
Ernest Ramel	Aksyon	—	—	—	—	—	0.1%	—	—	—
Bong Revilla	Lakas–CMD	—	26.7%	27.4%	15%	—	37.6%	36.8%	38.1%	39.5%
Dan Roleda	UNA	—	—	0.2%	—	—	0.2%	0.2%	0.2%	1.0%
Geraldine Roman	PDP–Laban	0.2%	—	0.9%	—	—	—	—	—	—
Martin Romualdez	Lakas–CMD	7.9%	7.8%	5.4%	4%	—	—	—	—	—
Harry Roque	PRP	8.7%	7.9%	7.7%	5%	8%	6.7%	—	—	—
Lemy Roxas	KDP	—	—	—	—	—	3.6%	—	—	—
Mar Roxas	Liberal	25.4%	27.1%	27.7%	22%	30%	35.0%	39.8%	24.5%	21.1%
Nur-Ana Sahidulla	KDP	—	—	—	—	—	0.3%	0.4%	1.3%	1.6%
Maria Lourdes Sereno	Independent	—	—	—	4%	7%	—	—	—	—
Judy Taguiwalo	Independent	0.7%	1.0%	—	—	—	—	—	—	—
Erin Tañada	Liberal	1.7%	5.2%	3.4%	3%	5%	5.1%	5.2%	3.6%	4.7%
Antonio Tinio	ACT Teachers	1.4%	1.2%	1.0%	—	—	—	—	—	—
Francis Tolentino	PDP–Laban	14.6%	9.9%	11.4%	11%	16%	19.4%	32.1%	22.8%	28.9%
Lucy Torres-Gomez	PDP–Laban	8.1%	—	—	—	—	—	—	—	—
Arthur Tugade	Independent	1.0%	—	—	—	—	—	—	—	—
Erwin Tulfo	Independent	36.7%	—	—	—	—	—	—	—	—
Ramon Tulfo	Independent	—	27.1%	27.0%	—	—	—	—	—	—
Reynaldo Umali	PDP–Laban	2.8%	2.3%	3.4%	—	—	—	—	—	—
Mocha Uson	PDP–Laban	1.3%	2.0%	1.3%	—	—	—	—	—	—
Butch Valdes	KDP	—	—	—	—	—	1.1%	0.4%	1.5%	0.8%
Cynthia Villar	Nacionalista	55.6%	50.1%	57.7%	46%	53%	66.6%	61.0%	51.7%	55.9%
Don't know		0.5%	1.3%	1.6%	6%	6%	1.1%	1.1%	—	—
Refused		0.8%	2.5%	1.9%	—	—	2.2%	1.6%	5.2%	5.8%
None		4.5%	1.0%	0.1%	—	—	1.6%	1.0%	1.5%	1.9%
Invalid votes (13 or more names)		—	—	—	—	—	—	—	4.7%	3.7%
