= Magdalo =

Magdalo may refer to:

== Philippines ==
- Magdalo (faction), a faction of the Katipunan, a 19th century Philippine revolutionary group
- Magdalo Group, a group of dissident soldiers in the Philippines during the 21st century
- Magdalo Party-List, a political party-list that represents retired Filipino soldiers
- Partido Magdalo, a local political party in Cavite, Philippines
- Samahang Magdalo, a nationalist organization based in the Philippines

== Other ==
- Magdalo Mussio, Italian author, artist, animator, and inventor
