= Samahang Magdalo =

Filipino nonprofit nationalist organization

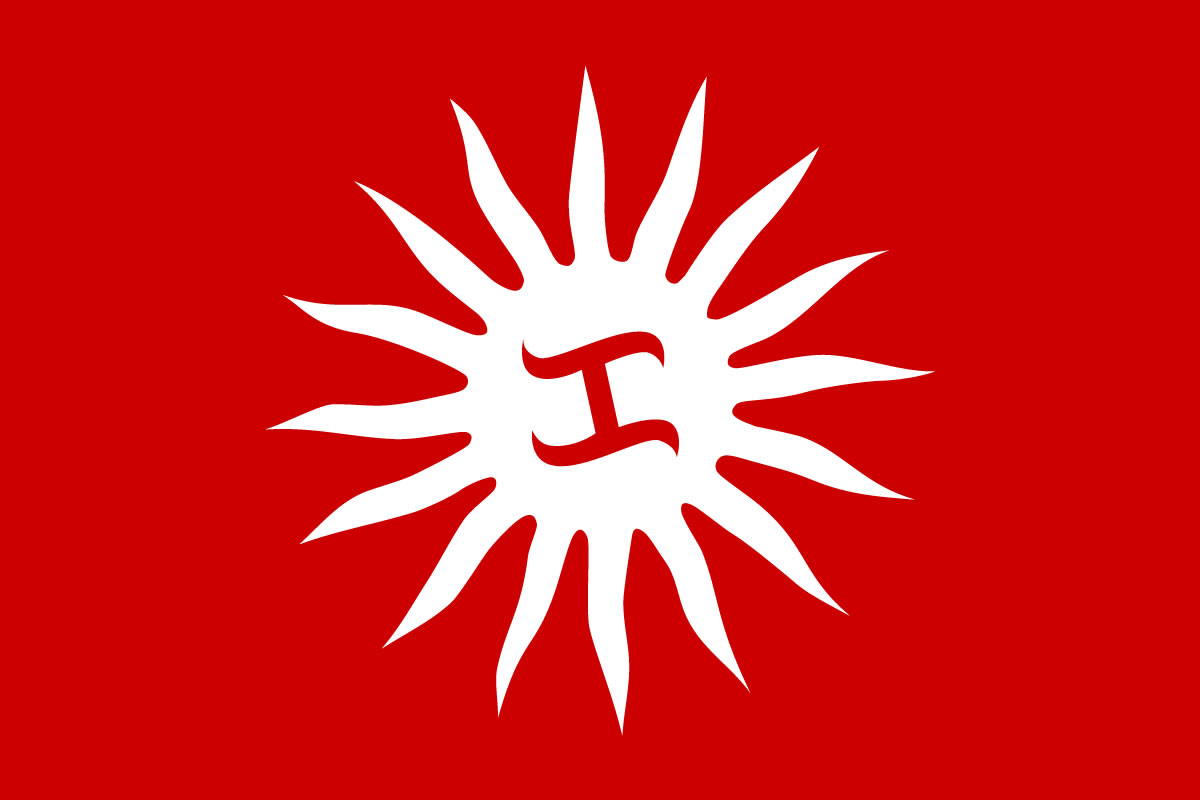
- Predecessor: Magdalo Group
- Type: Non-stock, Non-profit
- Legal status: Association
- Purpose: Socio-civic, Filipino nationalism
- Headquarters: No. 86 Sct. Ojeda St., Brgy. Obrero, District IV, 1103
- Location: Quezon City
- Region served: Philippines
- Official language: Filipino, English
- President: Norberto E. Santiago Jr.
- Affiliations: Magdalo

Samahang Magdalo (English: "Magdalo Association") is a socio-civic, non-profit, nationalist organisation, based in the Philippines. It is otherwise known as the New Katipunan. The group was formally recognised by the Securities and Exchange Commission on September 9, 2010, in Mandaluyong, Metro Manila. It is registered SEC with Company Registration Number CN201014489 and Company Tax Identification Number (TIN) 007-869-045.

== Political involvement ==
=== 2010 elections ===
On October 25, 2009, Samahang Magdalo initially endorsed senator Francis Escudero for president for the 2010 Philippine presidential election, however, Escudero later backed out of the presidential bid. Samahang Magdalo also endorsed brigadier general Danilo Lim and colonel Ariel Querubin for senators, both facing charges for mutiny. Neither of them won. On May 7, 2010, 3 days before the election, Samahang Magdalo clarified and endorsed senator Manny Villar and Mar Roxas for president and vice president respectively. Villar nor Roxas won in their respective races. By 2009, the group had managed to garner about 19,000 members nationwide.

=== Post 2010 ===
On March 5, 2011, senator Antonio Trillanes convened with at least 40 chapter leaders of the Samahang Magdalo at the Cebu International Convention Center in Mandaue. By that date, the group has 100,000 members nationwide and planned to double it by the end of 2011. On March 7, 2011, Trillanes denied that the Samahang Magdalao has any links to the Communist Party of the Philippines (CPP) and the New People's Army (NPA) after a member of the group met with key leaders of the CPP-NPA, that member was then expelled from the group.

=== 2016 elections ===
In a survey conducted inside of the group for their preference for vice president, from August 11 to 13, 2015, Escudero received 53.8% of the votes while Trillanes was in second with just 22.6% of the votes. On October 5, 2016, Trillanes formalized his candidacy for vice president for the 2016 Philippine presidential election as an independent despite being a member of the Nacionalista Party, he announced his candidacy at the 2016 national convention of Samahang Magdalo at Amoranto Sports Complex in Quezon City, by 2016, the party has achieved 506,000 card-bearing members and 541 chapters nationwide. Running without a running mate, Samahang Magdalo and Trillanes endorsed senator Grace Poe at the national convention, Poe was the presidential running mate of Escudero. Trillanes went on to lose the election landing 5th with 868,501 votes.

=== Post 2016 ===
Magdalo Party-List house representative Gary Alejano flew to Eastern Visayas to lead a meeting of Samahang Magdalo, many leaders of the organizations have become critics of president Rodrigo Duterte.

=== 2019 elections ===
Alejano ran for senator in the 2019 Philippine Senate election after talking and consulting with the group. Alejano was a part of the Otso Diretso opposition slate but lost.

=== 2028 elections ===
On April 22, 2026, Samahang Magdalo will push for senator Risa Hontiveros to run for president for the upcoming 2028 Philippine presidential election according to Trillanes.
