= 2019 Philippine Senate election =

33rd election of members to the Senate of the Philippines

- May 13, 2019

12 (of the 24) seats to the Senate of the Philippines 13 seats needed for a majority
- Opinion polls
Alliance	Hugpong	8D	NPC (Note: There were 2 NPC candidates in this election. One (JV Ejercito) ran under the senatorial ticket of Hugpong ng Pagbabago (HNP); the other (Lito Lapid) was not included in any ticket; it was Lapid who won a seat. The figures here are for Lapid; Ejercito's vote totals are included in the HNP totals.)
Seats won	9	0	1
Popular vote	203,023,825	50,038,801	16,965,464
Percentage	56.23	13.82	4.68
Alliance	UNA	Independent
Seats won	1	1
Popular vote	14,974,776	34,810,328
Percentage	4.13	9.61

- Composition of the Senate after the election, with the seats up for election inside the box.
Senate President before election
Tito Sotto
NPC
Elected Senate President
Tito Sotto
NPC

The 33rd election of members to the Senate of the Philippines was held on May 13, 2019.

The seats of 12 senators elected in 2013 were contested during this election, and the senators that were elected in this election would serve up to June 30, 2025. The winners in this election joined the winners of the 2016 election to form the 18th Congress of the Philippines. The senators elected in 2016 would serve until June 30, 2022.

The Partido Demokratiko Pilipino-Lakas ng Bayan (PDP–Laban), the ruling party headed by President Rodrigo Duterte, led its own administration coalition, the Hugpong ng Pagbabago.

The Senate election was held concurrently with elections to the House of Representatives and local officials above the barangay level.

Hugpong ng Pagbabago won overwhelmingly, while the main opposition coalition, Otso Diretso, was not able to win any seat in the Senate. Hugpong won 9 seats, while the Nationalist People's Coalition, United Nationalist Alliance, and an independent candidate won 1 seat each.

A total of five women, or 42% of the seats contested, won the election, beating the previous record of four female winners set in 2013 (12 seats contested) and in 1992 (24 seats contested).

== Electoral system ==
Senate elections in the Philippines are conducted via the plurality-at-large voting system, where the entire country is one at-large "district". Each voter can select up to twelve candidates (one vote per candidate), and the twelve candidates with the highest total number of votes are elected.

Senators are term-limited to two consecutive terms, although they are eligible for a third non-consecutive term. Only half of the seats are up in every senatorial election. The winning senators succeeded those elected in 2013, and joined those elected in 2016 in the 18th Congress.

Each party endorses a slate of candidates, typically not exceeding a 12-person ticket. A party may also choose to invite "guest candidates" to complete its slate. The party may even include, with the candidates' consent, independent candidates and candidates from other parties as the party's guest candidates. Parties also may form coalitions to endorse a multi-party slate of candidates.

While the Philippines is a multi-party system, parties tend to group themselves into two major coalitions in midterm elections (e.g. Lakas-Laban vs NPC in 1995; PPC vs Puwersa ng Masa in 2001). This is opposed to senatorial elections in presidential election years where most presidential candidates also have senatorial slates. This results in an election where voters can choose between two major political forces. Sometimes a weaker third coalition is also formed.

Winning candidates are proclaimed by the Commission on Elections (COMELEC), sitting as the National Board of Canvassers. Candidates are proclaimed senators-elect if the thirteenth-place candidate no longer has a mathematical chance of surpassing the twelfth-place candidate. Post-proclamation disputes are handled by the Senate Electoral Tribunal, a body composed of six senators and three justices from the Supreme Court.

== Coalitions ==
=== 2016 election ===
As the 2016 Senate election was held concurrently with the presidential election, most of the presidential candidates also put up their respective senatorial slates. These slates shared several candidates, although most of the shared candidates only campaigned with one slate. The presidential election was won by Davao City Mayor Rodrigo Duterte of the Partido Demokratiko Pilipino-Lakas ng Bayan (PDP–Laban), while the vice presidency was won by the Liberal Party's Leni Robredo, the representative from Camarines Sur. Senator Bongbong Marcos disputed Robredo's victory, and his electoral protest was pending before the Presidential Electoral Tribunal at that time.

Koko Pimentel, Duterte's party-mate, was elected as president of the Senate in July 2016 by a large majority, while a handful of Liberal Party senators comprised the minority; they were later joined by other Liberal Party members who had earlier voted for Pimentel, forming a six-person minority bloc in the Senate.

Pimentel resigned from the Senate presidency on May 21, 2018. He was replaced by Tito Sotto of the Nationalist People's Coalition (NPC), who was elected by majority of the senators.

=== Coalition for Change / Tapang at Malasakit Alliance ===
In October 2017, the Partido Demokratiko Pilipino-Lakas ng Bayan (PDP–Laban) was only considering to form a coalition with the Nacionalista Party for the 2019 senatorial elections.

In November 2017, PDP–Laban reportedly released a "partial list" of their senatorial slate for the 2019 edition consisting of six people. The party's president Koko Pimentel clarified that the list was not finalized and remarked that there was "no party decision yet". In January 2018, the House Speaker announced that the 6 candidates were now official. In February 2018, two more names were added to PDP–Laban's potential slate.

Pimentel announced a shortlist of 20 names in April 2018. It included himself and the five other senators that were members of the majority bloc, several administration officials, representatives, and private citizens. Pimentel said that his list was not approved by Alvarez when he released it.

By August 2018, Pimentel wrote to Duterte of their party's prospective candidates for the Senate. Pimentel divided the names into three groups: members of PDP–Laban, outsiders, and the incumbent senators of the majority bloc. Pimentel said that Duterte's decision would be final in the composition of their slate.

=== Otso Diretso ===
In March 2018, a supposed Liberal Party slate was circulated on social media. The list of candidates included Interior Secretary Mar Roxas, Sen. Bam Aquino, former senators Teofisto Guingona III and Ramon Magsaysay Jr., former Pampanga governor Eddie Panlilio, former representative from Quezon Lorenzo Tañada III, representative from Albay Edcel Lagman, representative from Northern Samar Raul Daza, Magdalo Representative Gary Alejano, Representatives Jose Christopher Belmonte from Quezon City and Kaka Bag-ao from Dinagat Islands, and Cebu City Mayor Tomas Osmeña. However, on April 2, Magsaysay said that he had no plans of returning to the Senate. Lagman, Daza, and Belmonte all denied that they were running for senator. Alejano, meanwhile, neither confirmed nor denied his plans. After multiple candidates denied interest in running, Senator Francis Pangilinan denied that this slate was an accurate list of Liberal Party candidates, as the official list had yet to be finalized.

In April, Antonio Trillanes said that his Samahang Magdalo was cooperating with the Liberal Party, Akbayan and Tindig Pilipinas to put up an opposition coalition against the pro-Duterte parties. On April 24, Liberal Party and other groups urged Mar Roxas to run. By mid-May, the Liberal Party had settled on several names; however, Roxas himself declined to run. The Liberals intend to form a coalition with anti-Duterte groups, with the slate being named as "the Resistance". In June, Alejano announced his intention to run.

Leni Robredo announced that she accepted the role of opposition leader in the election, and they released the line-up by mid-September. The line up may include former Chief Justice Maria Lourdes Sereno, who was removed from office by a quo warranto petition. By August, Roxas, in an interview at Robredo's radio show said that he was unsure of his plans in 2019. In early September, a list of 18 possible candidates was publicized by the coalition. The list included incumbent senator Paolo Benigno "Bam" Aquino IV, Magdalo representative Gary Alejano, former Department of Interior and Local Government secretary Manuel "Mar" Roxas II, former chief justice Maria Lourdes Sereno, former Quezon representative Lorenzo "Erin" Tañada III, lawyer Jose Manuel "Chel" Diokno, former Bangsamoro Transition Committee member Samira Gutoc, former Solicitor General Florin Hilbay, former Akbayan representative Ibarra "Barry" Gutierrez III, actor Dingdong Dantes, former presidential spokesman Edwin Lacierda, writer Manuel Luis "Manolo" Quezon III, activist Leah Navarro, actress Agot Isidro, musician Jim Paredes, election lawyer Romulo Macalintal, former Social Welfare secretary Corazon "Dinky" Soliman, and ex-chief justice Hilario Davide Jr.

By October 2018, before the 2019 general elections, the Liberal Party formed the Otso Diretso (transl. Straight Eight), an electoral coalition led by the party that also comprises members of the Magdalo Party-List, Akbayan Citizens Action Party, and Akyson Demokratiko along with independent candidates. The coalition hopes to drive a new political culture based on political leaders practicing "makiking, matuto, kumilos" (listen, learn, take action), each candidate emphasizing the need for government to listen to its citizens. As part of the Liberal Party's efforts to instill this new political culture, it launched Project Makining in October 2018, a modern, nationwide listening campaign driven by volunteers. It aimed to find out what have been important to Filipinos, the basis for the messaging, strategy, and platform of the coalition.

=== Nationalist People's Coalition ===
By June 2017, Nationalist People's Coalition (NPC), erstwhile chairman emeritus Danding Cojuangco returned as chairman, in an active leadership role. Senate Majority Leader Tito Sotto said Cojuangco was reportedly unsatisfied with how the party was being run, as leadership cannot agree on what direction to take.

The party has considered all of the eligible incumbents from the majority bloc to run in its slate as "Friends of the party". Sotto also said that Bam Aquino, the only non-term limited incumbent from the minority bloc, was also invited to run in their slate. Aquino is the nephew of NPC founder Cojuangco who Sotto said would personally help Aquino in the latter's campaign. Sotto announced in July 2018 that Senator JV Ejercito and former senator Lito Lapid would run under the NPC banner. Ejercito said this was to avoid his running together with his half-brother Jinggoy Estrada, under the Pwersa ng Masang Pilipino. Lapid was formerly from the-then moribund Lakas–CMD.

=== Hugpong ng Pagbabago, Nacionalista, and other alliances ===
Hugpong ng Pagbabago, Davao City mayor Sara Duterte's regional political party in the Davao Region formed in mid-2018, reportedly had national parties it wanted to forge alliances with. By August, the Hugpong had established alliances with the Nacionalista Party, Nationalist People's Coalition, the National Unity Party, and six other local parties. In August, incumbent senator Cynthia Villar announced that she would seek reelection. The coalition also supported the candidacies of Governor Imee Marcos and Representative Pia Cayetano.

=== Partido Federal ng Pilipinas ===
A new political party called the Partido Federal ng Pilipinas (Federal Party of the Philippines) was launched and accredited by the Commission on Election on October 8, 2018. It elected Land Bank of the Philippines director Jayvee Hinlo as president. On October 17, 2018, the party nominated three senatorial candidates for the 2019 midterm elections, namely Maria Socorro Manahan, Elmer Francisco, and Diosdado Padilla.

=== Katipunan ng Kamalayang Kayumanggi ===
A new political party, led by Consultative Committee on Constitutional Amendments member Ding Generoso fielded nine candidates in this mid-term election.

== Term-limited and retiring incumbents ==
The following were barred from running since they were on their second consecutive six-year term:

1. Francis Escudero (Independent), running for governor of Sorsogon
  By April 2018, Escudero was undecided on his plans. He noted that he was enticed to be a private citizen after his term ends. He ultimately filed his candidacy to run for governor of Sorsogon under the NPC. He eventually won. Escudero ran for senator in 2022 and won.
2. Gregorio Honasan (UNA)
  Honasan was tagged to be most likely to be named as Secretary of Information and Communications Technology in December 2017. Honasan dismissed the report as a "mere rumor". Honasan was eventually appointed as Secretary Information and Communications Technology a day after his senatorial term expired. Honasan ran for senator in 2022 and lost.
3. Loren Legarda (NPC), running for House representative from Antique's at-large district
  Legarda was silent on plans after finishing her term, but was rumored to be nominated by President Duterte as Secretary of Social Welfare and Development. Legarda noted that the Department of Social Welfare and Development "is a very important department that should take care of the poorest and the most vulnerable population." Legarda ultimately filed her candidacy to be representative from Antique. She was facing disqualification as a case was filed by former Representative Exequiel Javier alleging she did not establish a six-month residency in the province. Later, the Election Registration Board of Pandan approved her transfer of registration. Legarda eventually won. Legarda ran for senator in 2022 and won.
4. Antonio Trillanes (Nacionalista)
  Trillanes did not run for any position in 2019, and would instead focus on teaching and being the chairman of the Samahang Magdalo. Trillanes ran for senator in 2022 and lost

After he had won, two quo warranto petitions were filed against Koko Pimentel, arguing that as he had already served two terms (from 2011 to 2019), then he should be term-limited and should not have been allowed to run.

=== Mid-term vacancies ===
1. Alan Peter Cayetano (Nacionalista), appointed as Secretary of Foreign Affairs
  Cayetano, who was on his second consecutive term, resigned from the Senate in order to become Secretary of Foreign Affairs on May 18, 2017. It left one vacant seat and since it was vacated less than three years before Cayetano's term would have expired, no special election was held to fill the seat. Cayetano resigned as foreign affairs secretary on October 17, 2018, and filed his candidacy as House representative from Pateros and Taguig's 1st district. Cayetano eventually won the election, and was later elected House Speaker. Cayetano ran for senator in 2022 and won.

== Marginal seats ==
These are the marginal seats that had a winning margin of 5% or less against the 13th placed candidate in the 2013 election, in ascending order via margin:

Incumbent	Party	2013 margin	2019 results
Gregorio Honasan	UNA	1.77%	Incumbent term-limited
JV Ejercito	NPC	2.95%	Incumbent lost reelection
Cynthia Villar	Nacionalista	3.29%	Incumbent won reelection
Antonio Trillanes	Nacionalista	4.05%	Incumbent term-limited

== Candidates ==
Half of the seats in the Senate, or the 12 seats disputed in odd-numbered years since 1995, were up in the 2019 senatorial election.

=== Administration ticket ===
Hugpong ng Pagbabago (Note: President Rodrigo Duterte has excluded Estrada and Revilla from this lineup due to their involvement in the 2013 Priority Development Assistance Fund scam.)
#	Name	Party
8.	Sonny Angara	LDP
16.	Bong Revilla	Lakas
19.	Pia Cayetano	Nacionalista
24.	Ronald dela Rosa	PDP–Laban
26.	JV Ejercito	NPC
29.	Jinggoy Estrada	PMP
34.	Bong Go	PDP–Laban
44.	Dong Mangudadatu	PDP–Laban
45.	Jiggy Manicad	Independent
46.	Imee Marcos	Nacionalista
54.	Koko Pimentel	PDP–Laban
60.	Francis Tolentino	PDP–Laban
62.	Cynthia Villar	Nacionalista

=== Opposition tickets ===
Otso Diretso
#	Name	Party
5.	Gary Alejano	Liberal
9.	Bam Aquino	Liberal
25.	Chel Diokno	Liberal
36.	Samira Gutoc	Liberal
37.	Florin Hilbay	Aksyon
41.	Romulo Macalintal	Independent
57.	Mar Roxas	Liberal
59.	Erin Tañada	Liberal

Labor Win alliance
#	Name	Party
11.	Lawin Arellano	Independent
22.	Neri Colmenares	Makabayan
23.	Leody de Guzman	PLM
47.	Sonny Matula	WPP
49.	Allan Montaño	Independent

=== Others ===
Katipunan ng Demokratikong Pilipino
#	Name	Party
18.	Toti Casiño	KDP
21.	Glenn Chong	KDP
32.	Larry Gadon	KBL
39.	RJ Javellana	KDP
58.	Nur-Ana Sahidulla	KDP
61.	Butch Valdes	KDP

Katipunan ng Kamalayang Kayumanggi
#	Name	Party
1.	Vangie Abejo	Independent
6.	Richard Alfajora	Independent
17.	Jesus Caceres	Independent
28.	Agnes Escudero	Independent
31.	Charlie Gaddi	Independent
33.	Ding Generoso	Independent
42.	Emily Mallillin	Independent
43.	Faisal Mangondato	Independent
50.	Joan Sheelah Nalliw	Independent

Labor Party Philippines
#	Name	Party
2.	Abner Afuang	WPP
4.	Shariff Albani	WPP
10.	Gerald Arcega	WPP
12.	Marcelino Arias	WPP
20.	Melchor Chavez	WPP
35.	Junbert Guigayuma	WPP
47.	Sonny Matula	WPP
48.	Luther Meniano	WPP

Partido Federal ng Pilipinas
#	Name	Party
30.	Elmer Francisco	PFP
53.	Dado Padilla	PFP

United Nationalist Alliance
#	Name	Party
15.	Nancy Binay	UNA
56.	Dan Roleda	UNA

Other non-independents
#	Name	Party
7.	Raffy Alunan	Bagumbayan
13.	Bernard Austria	PDSP
27.	Juan Ponce Enrile	PMP
40.	Lito Lapid	NPC
51.	Willie Ong	Lakas

Independent candidates
#	Name	Party
3.	Freddie Aguilar	Independent
14.	Jonathan Baldevarona	Independent
38.	Abraham Jangao	Independent
52.	Serge Osmeña	Independent
55.	Grace Poe	Independent

== Opinion polling ==
Opinion polling, locally known as "surveys" in the Philippines, is conducted by Social Weather Stations (SWS), Pulse Asia and other pollsters. The first poll released through by the DZRH website reportedly done by SWS in December 2017 was not posted in SWS's official website, and SWS neither confirmed nor denied the existence of the survey when asked by the Philippine Star, leading to speculation that it was commissioned by a third party.

=== Survey details ===
Date/s administered	Pollster	Sample size	Margin of error	Major issues when poll was administered
March 23–28, 2018	Pulse Asia	1,200	±3%	Movements to remove Chief Justice Maria Lourdes Sereno from office, withdrawal from the International Criminal Court, proposal to close Boracay Island, provisional acceptance of Janet Lim-Napoles to the Witness Protection Program. Only 57% of the respondents on the survey had surety in their 12 senatorial picks.
June 15–21, 2018	Pulse Asia	1,800	±2%	Ouster of Chief Justice Maria Lourdes Sereno, the anti-loiterer campaign of the government, killing of Catholic priests
September 1–7, 2018	Pulse Asia	1,800	±2%	Invalidation of the amnesty given to Antonio Trillanes, record-high inflation, Xiamen Airlines Flight 8667 accident at Ninoy Aquino International Airport
September 15–23, 2018	Social Weather Stations	1,500	±3%	This survey was commissioned by Alde Joselito Pagulayan.
September 15–23, 2018	Social Weather Stations	1,500	±3%	This survey was commissioned by Francis Tolentino.
December 14–21, 2018	Pulse Asia	1,800	±2%	
February 24–28, 2019	Pulse Asia	1,800	±2%	
April 10–14, 2019	Pulse Asia	1,800	±2%	
May 3–6, 2019	Pulse Asia	1,800	±2%	

=== Per candidate ===
This list includes all individuals named by at least 10% of respondents in any of the nine conducted surveys. The top 16 candidates with the highest favourability in each poll are listed below, where the top 12 is marked with a "black line". For a comprehensive list of all individuals included in the surveys, see the main article.

Rank	2018												2019					
Rank	Mar 23–28		Jun 15–21		Sep 1–7		Sep 15–23		Sep 15–23		Dec 14–21		Feb 24–28		Apr 10–14		May 3–6	
Rank	Pulse Asia		Pulse Asia		Pulse Asia		SWS		SWS		Pulse Asia		Pulse Asia		Pulse Asia		Pulse Asia	
1	Poe	70.8	Poe	67.4	Poe	70.1	Poe	52	Villar	53	Poe	75.6	Poe	67.5	Villar	51.7	Villar	55.9
2	Villar	55.6	Cayetano	55.7	Villar	57.7	Villar	46	Poe	43	Villar	66.6	Villar	61.0	Poe	50.5	Poe	47.7
3	Cayetano	53.8	Villar	50.1	Cayetano	54.4	Cayetano	37	Cayetano	43	Angara	58.5	Go	53.0	Lapid	45.7	Cayetano	45.0
4	Binay	45.8	Duterte	46.2	Binay	50.6	Binay	31	Pimentel	33	Cayetano	55.4	Angara	52.2	Cayetano	43.9	Go	42.0
5	Angara	44.9	Angara	41.9	Duterte	39.5	Pimentel	30	Lapid	33	Lapid	49.8	Lapid	49.0	Go	40.8	Revilla	39.5
6	Duterte	43.8	Estrada	37.9	Angara	37.1	Lapid	30	Estrada	31	Binay	46.7	Cayetano	47.0	Angara	40.4	Lapid	38.5
7	Pimentel	39.8	dela Rosa	37.7	Estrada	34.6	Estrada	29	Roxas	30	Pimentel	45.5	dela Rosa	44.6	Revilla	38.1	dela Rosa	37.9
8	Osmeña	38.0	Pimentel	37.7	Marcos	32.6	Angara	26	Binay	26	Osmeña	38.8	Binay	40.5	dela Rosa	36.7	Angara	44.9
9	Tulfo	36.7	Binay	37.1	Pimentel	32.4	Duterte	24	Angara	26	Revilla	37.6	Roxas	39.8	Binay	36.2	Marcos	34.1
10	Lapid	33.8	Osmeña	36.6	Lapid	32.2	Marcos	22	dela Rosa	25	Marcos	36.7	Revilla	36.8	Pimentel	31.8	Binay	32.8
11	dela Rosa	33.1	Lapid	36.2	Osmeña	29.8	Roxas	22	Marcos	24	Estrada	36.3	Marcos	36.0	Marcos	29.6	Pimentel	31.7
12	Estrada	32.8	Ejercito	35.6	Roxas	27.7	Aquino	22	Osmeña	24	dela Rosa	35.7	Pimentel	35.6	Estrada	28.8	Ejercito	31.2
13	Marcos	32.2	Aquino	32.1	Padilla	27.4	Osmeña III	19	Aquino	22	Roxas	35.0	Estrada	33.9	Aquino	28.8	Estrada	30.8
14	Aquino	30.5	Marcos	29.9	Revilla	27.4	Padilla	19	Ejercito	19	Ejercito	33.6	Tolentino	32.1	Ejercito	28.1	Aquino	30.6
15	Ejercito	29.0	Bautista	28.5	dela Rosa	27.0	dela Rosa	19	Tolentino	16	Aquino	32.6	Aquino	30.4	Osmeña	24.6	Tolentino	28.9
16	Padilla	26.2	Padilla	28.2	Tulfo	27.0	Ejercito	19	Go	12	Go	29.7	Ejercito	27.6	Roxas	24.5	Osmeña	23.3

=== Per party ===
- Parties (excluding independents) with the plurality of seats in boldface.
- Parties (excluding independents) with the majority of seats are shaded by the party color.

==== Seats won ====
- Totals may not add up to 12 due to margin of error.

Date	Pollster	LDP	Lakas	LP	NP	PDP–Laban	PMP	UNA	Ind
Mar 23–28, 2018	Pulse Asia	1	0	1	**3**	2	1	2	4
Jun 15–21, 2018	Pulse Asia	1	0	1	**2**	**2**	1	**2**	4
Sep 1–7, 2018	Pulse Asia	1	1	1	**3**	**3**	1	2	5
Sep 15–23, 2018	SWS	1	0	2	**3**	2	0	2	2
Sep 15–23, 2018	SWS	1	0	1	**3**	2	0	2	3

==== Seats after the election ====
Totals may not add up to 24 due to margin of error.

Date	Pollster	Akbayan	LDP	Lakas	LP	NP	NPC	PDP–Laban	PMP	UNA	Ind
June 30, 2016	Start of 17th Congress	1	1	0	**6**	3	3	2	0	3	5
Mar 23–28, 2018	Pulse Asia	1	1	0	**6**	3	2	4	1	2	7
Jun 15–21, 2018	Pulse Asia	1	1	0	**6**	2	2	4	1	2	7
Sep 1–7, 2018	Pulse Asia	1	1	1	**6**	3	2	5	1	2	8
Sep 15–23, 2018	SWS	1	1	0	**6**	4	2	4	0	2	4
Sep 15–23, 2018	SWS	1	1	0	**5**	4	2	4	0	2	5
Current party standings		1	1	0	**5**	3	3	3	1	2	5
February 24–28, 2019	Pulse Asia	1	1	0	4	4	3	5	1	1	4
April 10–14, 2019	Pulse Asia	1	1	1	5	4	3	4	0	1	4
May 3–6, 2019	Pulse Asia	1	1	1	4	4	3	5	0	1	4

Notes:

- Incumbent Senator Ralph Recto was denoted as a Liberal Party member up to September 21, 2018, after which he became a Nacionalista Party member.
- Incumbent Senator JV Ejercito was denoted as a PMP member up to October 10, 2018, after which he became an NPC member.

=== Per coalition ===
Date	Pollster	Hugpong	Otso Diretso	Others
February 24–28, 2019	Pulse Asia	13	0	3
April 10–14, 2019	Pulse Asia	10	1	3
May 3–6, 2019	Pulse Asia	11	1	3

== Debates ==
On February 28, 2019, Otso Diretso candidates Gary Alejano, Samira Gutoc, Florin Hilbay, and Romulo Macalintal wrote a letter to the Commission on Elections (COMELEC), requesting to facilitate a debate with administration-supported party Hugpong ng Pagbabago. Otso Diretso said that the debate "would benefit not only the senatorial aspirants, but mainly the voting public." Davao City Mayor Sara Duterte slammed the former for being "fixated" on debates. Prior to this, on February 25, the day of the 33rd anniversary of People Power Revolution, Otso Diretso had challenged the Hugpong ng Pagbabago candidates for public debate but none of them showed up in the event. On March 8, the COMELEC rejected the request of debate by Otso Diretso.

Debates independently organized outside of COMELEC were still done. GMA Network had their debate on February. On February and March, ABS-CBN organized series of debates entitled "Harapan" (lit. 'face off'). CNN Philippines held a debate in the University of Santo Tomas (site of their leg of the 2016 vice presidential debate) which was attended by 11 candidates on April.

== Issues ==
In February, Cebu representative Gwendolyn Garcia was dismissed by the Ombudsman for a corruption case and barred her from seeking public positions from 2019 onward, but Garcia said that she would appeal the dismissal at the courts.

Candidates campaigning from detention were previously allowed; Senator Antonio Trillanes ran and won in 2007 despite being jailed for taking part in the Oakwood mutiny. Trillanes was ultimately convicted of participating in a coup d'etat after winning, but accepted the amnesty passed by Congress that was proposed by President Benigno Aquino III. While convicts are not allowed to run anymore unless pardoned or accepting an amnesty, these people had pending cases as of yet and were innocent until proven guilty.

As this was a midterm election, it served as a de facto referendum on the policies of the presidency of Rodrigo Duterte, such as pursuing the Philippine drug war, bringing back the death penalty, federalism in the Philippines, and the Bangsamoro peace process, among other things.

=== Constitutional change ===
One of President Rodrigo Duterte's promises during the 2016 election campaign was to revise the current constitution and to shift the country from a unitary form to a federal form. On September 29, 2017, PDP–Laban presented a draft constitution to Congress.

The House of Representatives, through Speaker Pantaleon Alvarez began its own hearings on constitutional change without the participation of the Senate. Alvarez took a hard line on the interpretation that voting via the Constituent Assembly would be joint, instead of the two chambers voting separately, as is the usual. A joint vote would've rendered the Senate's votes as virtually meaningless, as the representatives outnumbered them by almost 300–23. Senators maintained that voting must be done separately. Senator Grace Poe moved that all moves to make the Senate irrelevant in the proposed constitution be rejected by the Senate, and supported Panfilo Lacson's suggestion that any vote be separate.

== Results ==
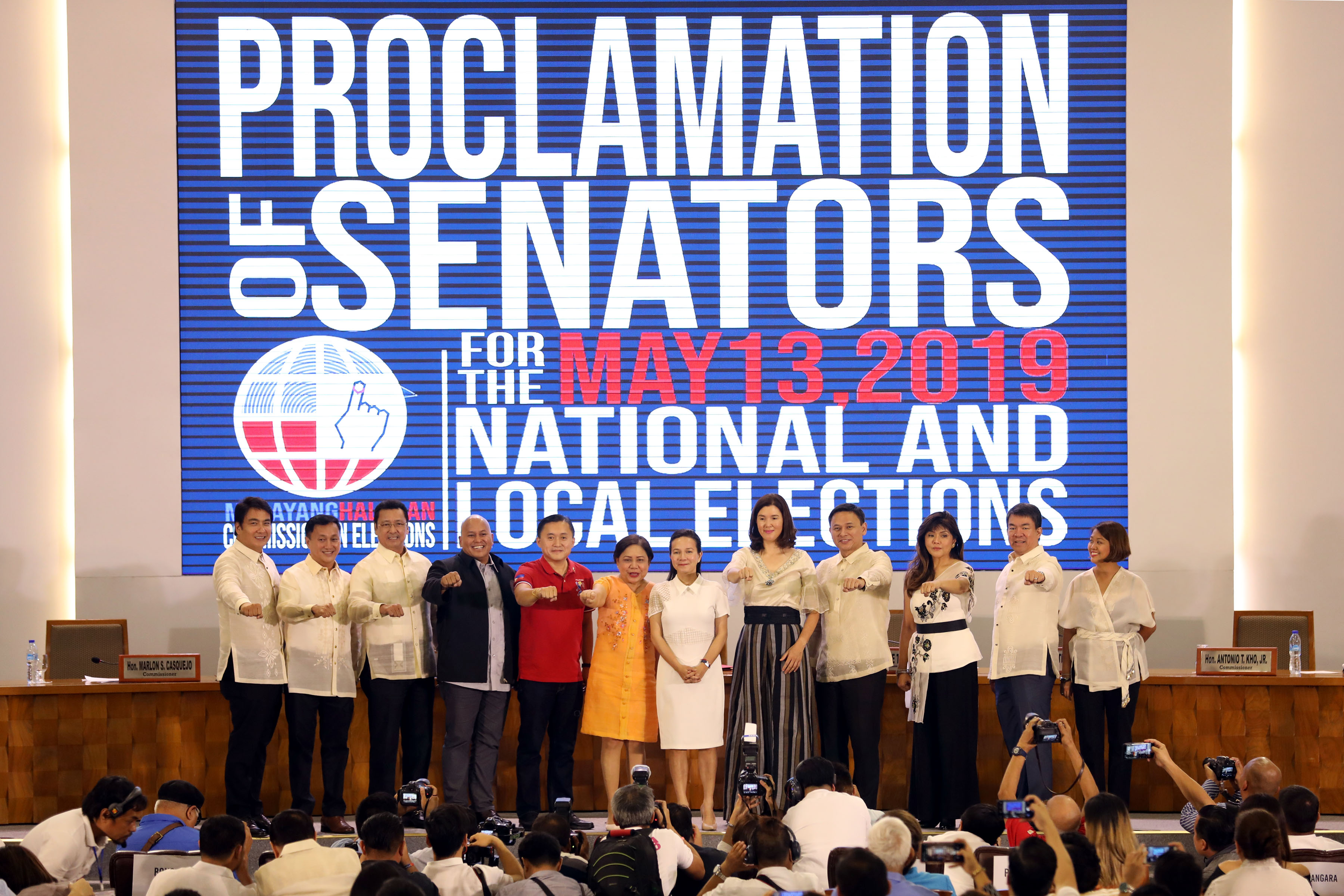
Proclamation of the winning twelve senators by the Commission on Elections on May 22, 2019. Ten senators flash President Duterte's signature fist.

This is how the Senate has been currently constituted. On July 25, 2016, voting 20–3, senators elected Koko Pimentel as the new Senate President. The senators who voted for Pimentel became the majority bloc. Senator Francis Escudero then nominated Senator Ralph Recto, a member of the Liberal Party, for the presidency. Senator Antonio Trillanes seconded Escudero's nomination. During nominal voting, Pimentel voted for Recto. Recto voted for Pimentel. After losing the vote, Recto automatically became the Minority Leader. He was joined by Escudero and Trillanes. Drilon was later elected Senate President Pro-Tempore while Sotto was elected Majority Leader.

On February 27, 2017, Senator Manny Pacquiao, a key administration ally, moved to remove from key positions LP senators Franklin Drilon, Francis Pangilinan and Bam Aquino and opposition-allied Risa Hontiveros (Akbayan). Drilon was removed as Senate President Pro-Tempore, Pangilinan was relieved as agriculture committee chairman, and Aquino was sacked as education committee chairman. Hontiveros was also removed as health committee head. The revamp prompted the LP senators to shift to the minority bloc. De Lima later joined them. Senator Ralph Recto, who used to be the Senate Minority Leader, was elected to replace Drilon as Senate President Pro-Tempore.

		1	2	3	4	5	6	7	8	9	10	11	12	13	14	15	16	17	18	19	20	21	22	23	24
Before election	Senate bloc	Majority bloc																		Minority bloc					
Before election	Party									‡	‡	‡	‡	‡	‡	‡	‡	‡	‡	‡	‡				
Election result		Not up								Ind	NPC	Hugpong ng Pagbabago									UNA	Not up			
After election	Party									√	+	√	+	+	+	√	+	*	+	√	√				
After election	Senate bloc	Majority bloc																				Minority bloc			

Key:

- ‡ Seats up
- + Gained by a party from another party
- √ Held by the incumbent
- * Held by the same party with a new senator

=== Per candidate ===
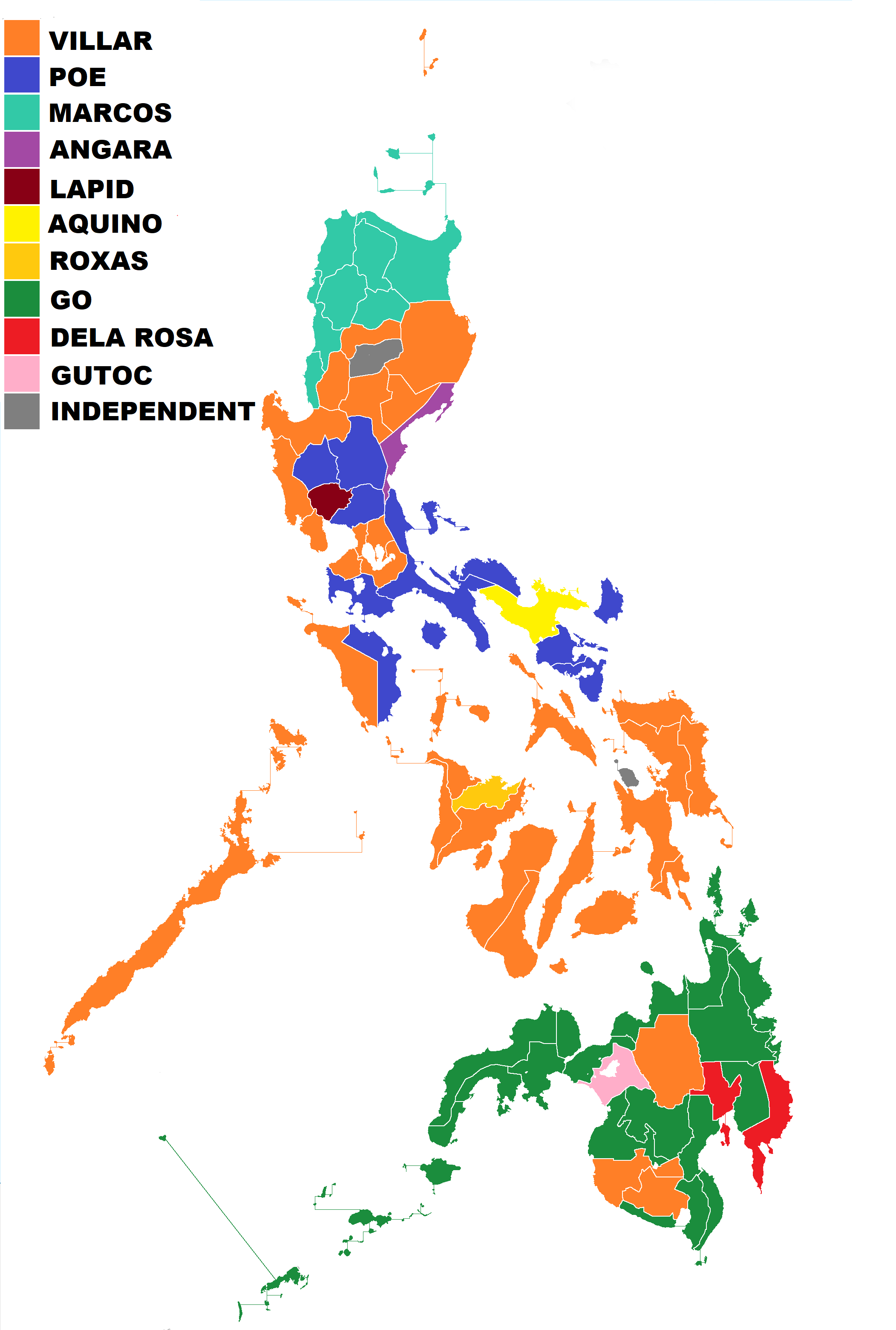
First-placer per province in the Philippines during the Senate election 2019

Winning candidates were proclaimed on May 22. Nine candidates in the Hugpong ng Pagbabago (HNP) slate won. None of the Otso Diretso candidates won, while three won who were from neither slate, with one each from the Nationalist People's Coalition (NPC) and the United Nationalist Alliance (UNA), and an independent candidate.

Five incumbents won reelection: Cynthia Villar, Sonny Angara and Koko Pimentel of HNP, Nancy Binay from UNA, and independent Grace Poe.

Four neophytes won election: Bong Go, Ronald dela Rosa, Imee Marcos and Francis Tolentino, all from HNP. Go and dela Rosa won their first elections.

Three former senators were elected back to the Senate: Pia Cayetano and Bong Revilla of HNP, and NPC's Lito Lapid.

Four former senators, Jinggoy Estrada of HNP, Mar Roxas of Otso Diretso, independent Serge Osmeña, and Juan Ponce Enrile of Pwersa ng Masang Pilipino, lost in their bids to reenter the Senate.

Incumbents JV Ejercito of HNP and Bam Aquino of Otso Diretso did not successfully defend their seats.

Candidate	Party or alliance		Votes	%
Cynthia Villar	Hugpong ng Pagbabago	Nacionalista Party	25,283,727	53.46
Grace Poe	Independent		22,029,788	46.58
Bong Go	Hugpong ng Pagbabago	PDP–Laban	20,657,702	43.68
Pia Cayetano	Hugpong ng Pagbabago	Nacionalista Party	19,789,019	41.84
Ronald dela Rosa	Hugpong ng Pagbabago	PDP–Laban	19,004,225	40.18
Sonny Angara	Hugpong ng Pagbabago	Laban ng Demokratikong Pilipino	18,161,862	38.40
Lito Lapid	Nationalist People's Coalition		16,965,464	35.87
Imee Marcos	Hugpong ng Pagbabago	Nacionalista Party	15,882,628	33.58
Francis Tolentino	Hugpong ng Pagbabago	PDP–Laban	15,510,026	32.79
Koko Pimentel	Hugpong ng Pagbabago	PDP–Laban	14,668,665	31.01
Bong Revilla	Hugpong ng Pagbabago	Lakas–CMD	14,624,445	30.92
Nancy Binay	United Nationalist Alliance		14,504,936	30.67
JV Ejercito	Hugpong ng Pagbabago	Nationalist People's Coalition	14,313,727	30.26
Bam Aquino	Otso Diretso	Liberal Party	14,144,923	29.91
Jinggoy Estrada	Hugpong ng Pagbabago	Pwersa ng Masang Pilipino	11,359,305	24.02
Mar Roxas	Otso Diretso	Liberal Party	9,843,288	20.81
Serge Osmeña	Independent		9,455,202	19.99
Willie Ong	Lakas–CMD		7,616,265	16.10
Dong Mangudadatu	Hugpong ng Pagbabago	PDP–Laban	7,499,604	15.86
Jiggy Manicad	Hugpong ng Pagbabago	Independent	6,896,889	14.58
Chel Diokno	Otso Diretso	Liberal Party	6,342,939	13.41
Juan Ponce Enrile	Pwersa ng Masang Pilipino		5,319,298	11.25
Gary Alejano	Otso Diretso	Liberal Party	4,726,652	9.99
Neri Colmenares	Labor Win	Makabayan	4,683,942	9.90
Samira Gutoc	Otso Diretso	Liberal Party	4,345,252	9.19
Romulo Macalintal	Otso Diretso	Independent	4,007,339	8.47
Erin Tañada	Otso Diretso	Liberal Party	3,870,529	8.18
Larry Gadon	Katipunan ng Demokratikong Pilipino	Kilusang Bagong Lipunan	3,487,780	7.37
Florin Hilbay	Otso Diretso	Aksyon Demokratiko	2,757,879	5.83
Freddie Aguilar	Independent		2,580,230	5.46
Glenn Chong	Katipunan ng Demokratikong Pilipino		2,534,335	5.36
Rafael Alunan III	Bagumbayan–VNP		2,059,359	4.35
Faisal Mangondato	Katipunan ng Kamalayang Kayumanggi	Independent	1,988,719	4.20
Agnes Escudero	Katipunan ng Kamalayang Kayumanggi	Independent	1,545,985	3.27
Diosdado Padilla	Partido Federal ng Pilipinas		1,095,337	2.32
Ernesto Arellano	Labor Win	Independent	937,713	1.98
Allan Montaño	Labor Win	Independent	923,419	1.95
Leody de Guzman	Labor Win	Partido Lakas ng Masa	893,506	1.89
Melchor Chavez	Labor Party Philippines		764,473	1.62
Vanjie Abejo	Katipunan ng Kamalayang Kayumanggi	Independent	656,006	1.39
Edmundo Casiño	Katipunan ng Demokratikong Pilipino		580,853	1.23
Abner Afuang	Labor Party Philippines		559,001	1.18
Shariff Ibrahim Albani	Labor Party Philippines		496,855	1.05
Dan Roleda	United Nationalist Alliance		469,840	0.99
Conrado Generoso	Katipunan ng Kamalayang Kayumanggi	Independent	449,785	0.95
Nur-Ana Sahidulla	Katipunan ng Demokratikong Pilipino		444,096	0.94
Abraham Jangao	Independent		434,697	0.92
Marcelino Arias	Labor Party Philippines		404,513	0.86
Richard Alfajora	Katipunan ng Kamalayang Kayumanggi	Independent	404,513	0.86
Sonny Matula	Labor Party Philippines/Labor Win		400,339	0.85
Elmer Francisco	Partido Federal ng Pilipinas		395,427	0.84
Joan Sheelah Nalliw	Katipunan ng Kamalayang Kayumanggi	Independent	390,165	0.82
Gerald Arcega	Labor Party Philippines		383,749	0.81
Butch Valdes	Katipunan ng Demokratikong Pilipino		367,851	0.78
Jesus Caceres	Katipunan ng Kamalayang Kayumanggi	Independent	358,472	0.76
Bernard Austria	Partido Demokratiko Sosyalista ng Pilipinas		347,013	0.73
Jonathan Baldevarona	Independent		310,411	0.66
Emily Mallillin	Katipunan ng Kamalayang Kayumanggi	Independent	304,215	0.64
Charlie Gaddi	Katipunan ng Kamalayang Kayumanggi	Independent	286,361	0.61
RJ Javellana	Katipunan ng Demokratikong Pilipino		258,538	0.55
Junbert Guigayuma	Labor Party Philippines		240,306	0.51
Luther Meniano	Labor Party Philippines		159,774	0.34
Total			362,179,156	100.00
Total votes			47,296,442	–
Registered voters/turnout			63,643,263	74.31
Source: COMELEC

==== Provincial results per candidate ====
Cynthia Villar

Grace Poe

Bong Go

Ronald dela Rosa

Sonny Angara

Lito Lapid

Imee Marcos

Francis Tolentino

Koko Pimentel

Bong Revilla

Nancy Binay

=== Per coalition ===
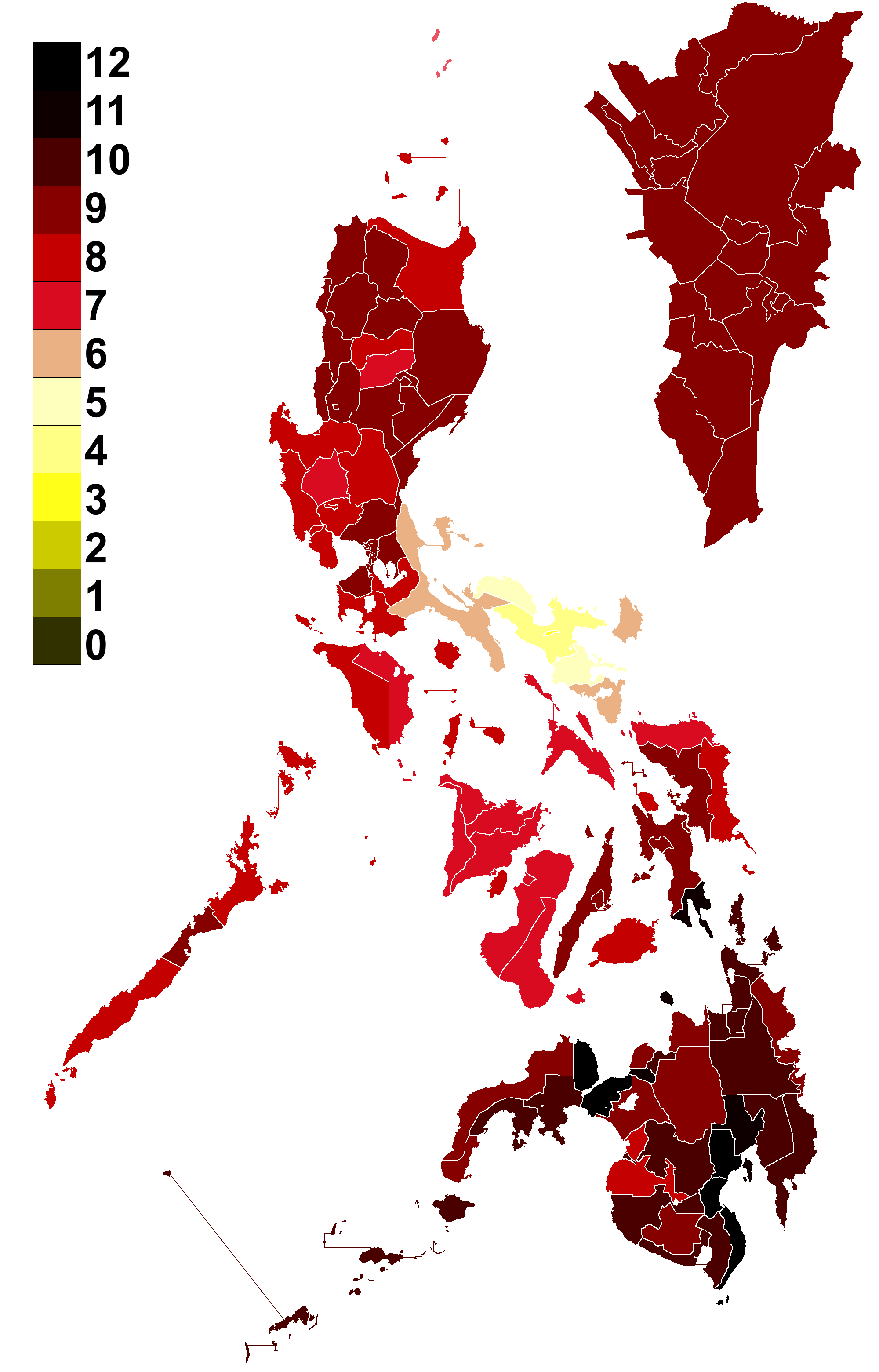
Map showing the number of winning HNP candidates if elections were done per province and city, with darker red shades denoting more candidates from HNP winning there. The winners are determined via the nationwide vote.

- The seats won totals does not account for guest candidates.

Party or alliance		Votes	%	Seats
Hugpong ng Pagbabago	PDP–Laban	77,340,222	21.35	4
Hugpong ng Pagbabago	Nacionalista Party	60,955,374	16.83	3
Hugpong ng Pagbabago	Laban ng Demokratikong Pilipino	18,161,862	5.01	1
Hugpong ng Pagbabago	Lakas–CMD	14,624,445	4.04	1
Hugpong ng Pagbabago	Nationalist People's Coalition	14,313,727	3.95	0
Hugpong ng Pagbabago	Pwersa ng Masang Pilipino	11,359,305	3.14	0
Hugpong ng Pagbabago	Independent	6,896,889	1.90	0
Hugpong ng Pagbabago	Total	203,651,824	56.23	9
Otso Diretso	Liberal Party	43,273,583	11.95	0
Otso Diretso	Aksyon Demokratiko	2,757,879	0.76	0
Otso Diretso	Independent	4,007,339	1.11	0
Otso Diretso	Total	50,038,801	13.82	0
Nationalist People's Coalition		16,965,464	4.68	1
United Nationalist Alliance		14,974,776	4.13	1
Katipunan ng Demokratikong Pilipino	Katipunan ng Demokratikong Pilipino	4,185,673	1.16	0
Katipunan ng Demokratikong Pilipino	Kilusang Bagong Lipunan	3,487,780	0.96	0
Katipunan ng Demokratikong Pilipino	Total	7,673,453	2.12	0
Lakas–CMD		7,616,265	2.10	0
Labor Win	Makabayang Koalisyon ng Mamamayan	4,683,942	1.29	0
Labor Win	Partido Lakas ng Masa	893,506	0.25	0
Labor Win	Independent	1,861,132	0.51	0
Labor Win	Total	7,438,580	2.05	0
Katipunan ng Kamalayang Kayumanggi		6,384,221	1.76	0
Pwersa ng Masang Pilipino		5,319,298	1.47	0
Labor Party Philippines		3,008,671	0.83	0
Bagumbayan–VNP		2,059,359	0.57	0
Partido Federal ng Pilipinas		1,490,764	0.41	0
Labor Win/Labor Party Philippines common candidate		400,339	0.11	0
Partido Demokratiko Sosyalista ng Pilipinas		347,013	0.10	0
Independent		34,810,328	9.61	1
Total		362,179,156	100.00	12
Total votes		47,296,442	–	
Registered voters/turnout		63,643,263	74.31	

Vote share
Hugpong	56.23%
Otso Diretso	13.82%
NPC	4.68%
UNA	4.13%
Others	21.14%

Senate seats
Hugpong	75.00%
Otso Diretso	0.00%
NPC	8.33%
UNA	8.33%
Others	8.33%

=== Per party ===
Party	Votes	%	+/–	Seats				
Party	Votes	%	+/–	Up	Before	Won	After	+/−
PDP–Laban	77,340,222	21.35	New	1	2	4	5	+3
Nacionalista Party	60,955,374	16.83	+15.97	2	3	3	4	+1
Liberal Party	43,273,583	11.95	−7.99	1	5	0	4	−1
Nationalist People's Coalition	31,279,191	8.64	−1.37	2	4	1	3	−1
Lakas–CMD	22,240,710	6.14	+2.08	0	0	1	1	New
Laban ng Demokratikong Pilipino	18,161,862	5.01	New	1	1	1	1	0
Pwersa ng Masang Pilipino	16,678,603	4.61	+0.90	0	0	0	0	0
United Nationalist Alliance	14,974,776	4.13	−3.55	2	2	1	1	−1
Makabayan	4,683,942	1.29	−0.73	0	0	0	0	0
Katipunan ng Demokratikong Pilipino	4,185,673	1.16	New	0	0	0	0	0
Kilusang Bagong Lipunan	3,487,780	0.96	+0.35	0	0	0	0	0
Labor Party Philippines	3,409,010	0.94	+0.17	0	0	0	0	0
Aksyon Demokratiko	2,757,879	0.76	−1.86	0	0	0	0	0
Bagumbayan–VNP	2,059,359	0.57	New	0	0	0	0	0
Partido Federal ng Pilipinas	1,490,764	0.41	New	0	0	0	0	0
Partido Lakas ng Masa	893,506	0.25	New	0	0	0	0	0
Partido Demokratiko Sosyalista ng Pilipinas	347,013	0.10	New	0	0	0	0	0
Independent	53,959,909	14.90	−16.52	2	5	1	4	−1
Akbayan				0	1	0	1	0
Vacancy				1	1	0	0	−1
Total	362,179,156	100.00	–	12	24	12	24	0
Total votes	47,296,442	–						
Registered voters/turnout	63,643,263	74.31						

Vote share
PDP–Laban	21.22%
NP	16.86%
LP	11.97%
NPC	8.65%
Lakas	6.15%
LDP	5.02%
PMP	4.61%
UNA	4.14%
Independent	14.92%
Others	6.45%

Senate seats
PDP–Laban	33.33%
NP	25.00%
LP	0%
NPC	8.33%
Lakas	8.33%
LDP	8.33%
PMP	0%
UNA	8.33%
Independent	8.33%
Others	0%

=== Quo warranto petitions against Pimentel ===
Koko Pimentel, who originally lost in 2007, won an electoral protest in 2011, was reelected in 2013, then won on this election, had two quo warranto petitions filed against him after he had won, alleging that he had already served two consecutive terms, and thus was term-limited on this election. The Senate Electoral Tribunal then dismissed the petitions, ruling that Pimentel's supposed first term from 2011 to 2013 was an "involuntary interruption" of the term, arguing that "Being an interrupted term, the 2011-2013 Senatorial term cannot be counted against [Pimentel] for purposes of counting term limitation provided by the Constitution", and that Pimentel was "not prohibited to run and be elected for the 2019-2025 Senate term since he has yet to serve two (2) consecutive terms in full within the contemplation of prevailing law and jurisprudence".

== Defeated incumbents ==
1. Bam Aquino (Liberal/8D), ran in 2025 and won
2. JV Ejercito (NPC/HNP), ran in 2022 and won

== See also ==
Controversial media portrayals of senatorial candidates before the start of campaign period (February 12, 2019):

- Bato (The General Ronald dela Rosa Story) – a film about Ronald "Bato" dela Rosa
- "Steak" – an episode of Maalaala Mo Kaya about Christopher "Bong" Go
- "Tatlong Henerasyon ng Sipag at Tiyaga" – an episode of Magpakailanman about the family of Cynthia Villar
