= Otso Diretso =

Coalition in 2019 Philippine Senate elections

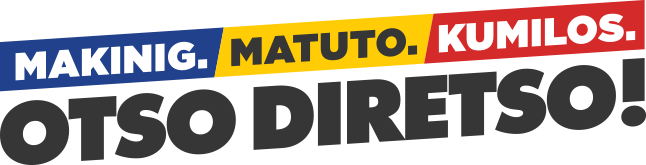
- Leader: Leni Robredo
- Senate leader: Bam Aquino
- Campaign manager: Kiko Pangilinan
- Founded: 2018
- Dissolved: 2019
- Preceded by: Koalisyon ng Daang Matuwid
- Succeeded by: Team Robredo–Pangilinan
- Ideology: Liberalism (Filipino); Factions: Progressivism; Filipino nationalism
- Political position: Center; Factions: Center-left to center-right
- Coalition members: Liberal; Akbayan; Magdalo; Aksyon
- Slogan: Makinig. Matuto. Kumilos. (English: Listen. Learn. Act.)

Website
- http://otsodiretso.ph

Otso Diretso (transl. Straight Eight IPA: [ˈɔtʃɔ dɪˈrɛtʃɔ]), initially called the Oposisyon Koalisyon (transl. Opposition Coalition) was an electoral alliance formed to field candidates for the 2019 Philippine general election, in opposition to President Rodrigo Duterte. Otso Diretso fielded eight candidates (otso is the Filipino language literal translation of the Spanish word for "eight" or ocho) for the Senate election from the Liberal, Akbayan, Magdalo Party-List, and Aksyon Demokratiko parties. Senator Francis Pangilinan, president of the Liberal Party, served as the campaign manager.

None of the eight senatorial candidates under Otso Diretso won a seat. It was the first time in the history of the current bicameral composition of the Philippine Congress under the 1987 Constitution that the opposition failed to win a seat in either chamber, and the first time since the 1938 election that the opposition failed to win a single seat in a legislative election.

== Background and platform ==
The alliance believed that the 2019 midterm elections was a "referendum" on Duterte's government. The coalition aimed to build a new political culture based on political leaders practicing "makinig, matuto, kumilos" (Tagalog for "listen, learn, take action"), with each candidate emphasizing the need for government to listen to its citizens.

The coalition's platforms and policies were based on Project Makinig, a nationwide listening campaign conducted by 9,800 volunteers that generated 118,000 conversations. Project Makinig aimed to find out the issues most relevant to Filipino voters, to form the basis for the messaging, strategy, and platform of the coalition.

Otso Diretso's eight-point political platform included "poverty alleviation, a more robust economy with more jobs and lower prices of goods, a peaceful home and nation for the benefit of Filipino children, improved education and free college tuition that will lead to jobs, fair wages and profit for laborers, farmers, and fishermen, expanded rights for senior citizens and PWDs, national and judicial reform."

Robredo denounced the fielding of "popular" candidates into the senatorial slate for the purpose of ensuring victory and emphasized the inclusion of "relatively unknown" candidates, saying that "popularity should be at the lower end of the spectrum [of choosing candidates]."

== Senatorial slate ==
Candidate name and party	Position	Elected
Gary Alejano; Liberal (Note: Originally from Magdalo, but Liberal in the ballot)	House representative of Magdalo	No
Bam Aquino; Liberal	Senator of the Philippines	No
Chel Diokno; Liberal	none (founding Dean De La Salle University College of Law, chairman Free Legal Assistance Group)	No
Samira Gutoc; Independent	Member of the Bangsamoro Transition Commission	No
Florin Hilbay; Aksyon	Solicitor General	No
Romulo Macalintal; Independent	none (lawyer)	No
Mar Roxas; Liberal	Secretary of the Interior and Local Government	No
Erin Tañada; Liberal	Deputy Speaker and House representative of Quezon's 4th district	No

== Results ==
All Otso Diretso candidates lost the election, the second time that a Liberal Party-led coalition suffered a great loss since 1955.

Rank	Candidate	Votes	%
14.	Bam Aquino	14,144,923	29.91%
16.	Mar Roxas	9,843,288	20.81%
21.	Chel Diokno	6,342,939	13.41%
23.	Gary Alejano	4,726,652	9.99%
25.	Samira Gutoc	4,345,252	9.19%
26.	Romulo Macalintal	4,007,339	8.47%
27.	Erin Tañada	3,870,529	8.18%
29.	Florin Hilbay	2,757,879	5.83%

== See also ==
- Koalisyon ng Daang Matuwid, their predecessor coalition in 2016
- Team Robredo–Pangilinan, their successor coalition in 2022
- KiBam, their successor coalition in 2025 which Bam Aquino is a member
