= Gary Alejano =

Filipino politician and soldier (born 1973)

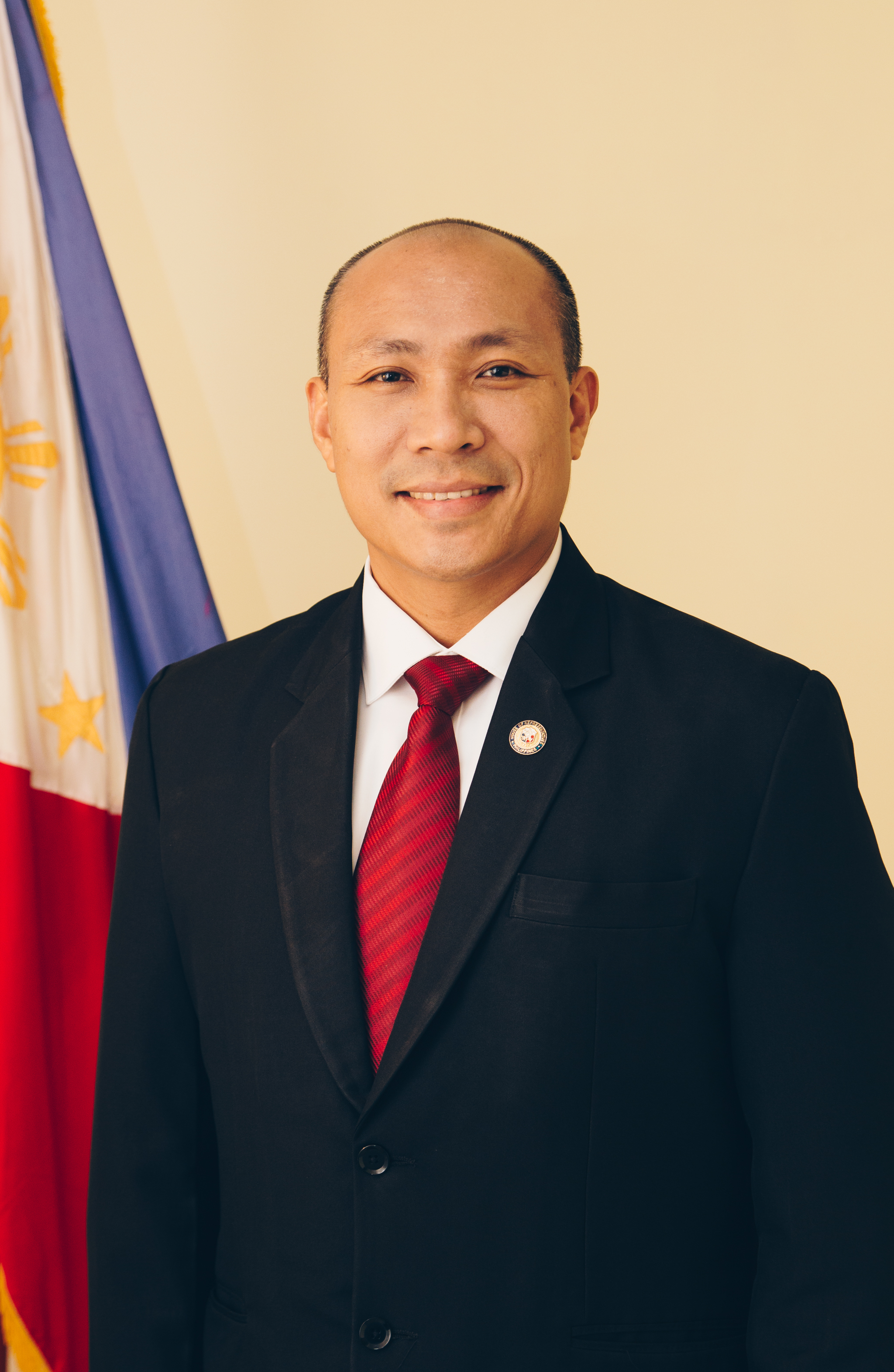
- Alejano in 2016

Member of the Philippine House of Representatives for Magdalo Party-List
- In office June 30, 2013 – June 30, 2019 Serving with Ashley Acedillo (2013–2016)

Personal details
- Born: Gary Cajolo Alejano; January 22, 1973 (age 53) Sipalay, Negros Occidental, Philippines
- Party: Liberal (2018–present); Magdalo (party-list; 2012–present)
- Other political affiliations: Independent (2009–2012)
- Education: University of Cebu; Philippine Military Academy
- Occupation: Soldier (formerly), politician
- Military career
- Allegiance: Philippines
- Branch: Philippine Marine Corps
- Service years: 1995–2008
- Rank: Captain
- Units: Philippine Marine Corps; Presidential Security Group
- Conflicts: Moro conflict Oakwood mutiny Manila Peninsula siege

Gary Cajolo Alejano Sr. is a Filipino politician and former soldier who was a member of the House of Representatives for Magdalo Party-List. He was a major participant in the Oakwood mutiny in 2003 and the Manila Peninsula siege in 2007, both involving military personnel who expressed grievances against perceived corruption in the Arroyo administration.

== Early life and education ==
Gary Alejano was born in 1973 in Sipalay, Negros Occidental. He is the third eldest among a brood of five born to a farmer and a teacher. He pursued a degree in electrical engineering for two years at the University of Cebu before taking the physical admission examinations at the Philippine Military Academy with his trip to Manila supported by a South Korean martial arts group.

Alejano kept his attempt to enter the PMA a secret from his mother who initially opposed him in becoming a soldier. Nevertheless, Alejano entered the PMA and later graduated in 1995.

== Military career ==
Alejano was part of the Philippine Marines and held the rank of captain. He was part of the force reconnaissance unit who fought against Moro rebels in southern Mindanao. This included the 2000 campaign against the Moro Islamic Liberation Front (MILF) during the presidency of Joseph Estrada. He survived a shot near the head in Maguindanao during battle with the MILF, and was nominated for the AFP Medal of Valor which remained pending as of 2017 due to his participation in mutiny.

=== Oakwood mutiny ===
In July 2003, he was part of the Oakwood mutiny against the administration of president Gloria Macapagal Arroyo and led by Antonio Trillanes, Gerardo Gambala and Nicanor Faeldon, where more than 300 armed forces personnel occupied the Oakwood Premier building in Makati and demanded the resignation of top military and police officials due to grievances in how the government supervised the military. Alejano at the time was part of the Presidential Security Group. The mutiny failed and the soldiers were arrested and faced rebellion charges.

=== Manila Peninsula siege ===
In 2007, Alejano was part of the Manila Peninsula siege also led by Trillanes. He was dismissed in 2008 from the military after a court-martial found him guilty for violating the article of war.

== Political career ==
Alejano ran for mayor of Sipalay, Negros Occidental in the 2010 election but lost to incumbent mayor Oscar Montilla. Magdalo also tried to run as a partylist group but its accreditation was blocked by the Commission on Election (COMELEC).

After his loss, Alejano filed an election protest against mayor Montilla, and soon after filed another case against him before COMELEC that charged Montilla with vote buying and illegal use of government funds. The latter case, supported by human rights lawyer Harry Roque, was the first lawsuit filed with the help of Center Law, a group of lawyers largely from the University of the Philippines Diliman that aims to bring reforms to the Philippine electoral system.

President Benigno Aquino III, Arroyo's successor who took office in 2010, granted Alejano and his companions in the two mutinies pardon.

=== House of Representatives ===
Magdalo, after formally renouncing violence, was allowed to contest in the 2013 election. The group won two seats, which was filled by Alejano and Ashley Acedillo.

The group lost a seat in the 2016 election which preceded the presidency of Rodrigo Duterte. Alejano as first nominee remained in the lower house. Alejano filed an impeachment case against Duterte in March 2017 for allegedly adopting a state policy that encourages extrajudicial killings by police officials and "vigilante groups" during the Philippine drug war, his unexplained wealth, and corrupt practices as mayor of Davao City. The case was dismissed by the House Justice Committee as chaired by Reynaldo Umali after they deemed it to be insufficient in substance. He has been critical of Duterte's war on drugs and his policy on the South China Sea dispute.

Magdalo kept its seat in the 2019 election, but Manuel Cabochan took over since Alejano ran for the Senate. Magdalo failed to win any seats in the 2022 and 2025 elections.

=== 2019 Senate bid ===
Alejano ran in the 2019 Senate election under the Liberal Party banner. He was part of opposition Otso Diretso coalition. Like the rest of the slate, Alejano eventually lost, receiving 4,726,652 of votes and placing 23rd in the official results.

== Electoral history ==
Electoral history of Gary Alejano
Year	Office	Party	Votes received				Result
Year	Office	Party	Total	%	P.	Swing	Result
2010	Mayor of Sipalay	Independent	—N/a	—N/a	2nd	—N/a	Lost
2013	Representative (Party-list)	Magdalo	567,426	2.05%	14th	—N/a	Won
2016	Representative (Party-list)	Magdalo	279,356	0.86%	41st	-1.19	Won
2025	Representative (Party-list)	Magdalo	78,984	0.19%	114th	-0.67	Lost
2019	Senator of the Philippines	Liberal	4,726,652	9.99%	23rd	—N/a	Lost
