= Katipunan ng Demokratikong Pilipino =

Ultranationalist political party in the Philippines

- President: Carlos Enrique Valdes III
- Secretary-General: Maria Catherine Suba
- Founder: Butch Valdes
- Founded: August 31, 2018
- Headquarters: San Juan City, Metro Manila
- Ideology: Neo-nationalism; Realism; Federalism; Filipino nationalism Ultranationalism; Economic nationalism Anti-communism; Dutertismo
- Political position: Far-right
- Slogan: Ang Partido para sa Kinabukasan. (The Party for the Future)
- Senate: 0 / 24
- House of Representatives: 0 / 317

Katipunan ng Demokratikong Pilipino (KDP) is a Philippine far-right neo-nationalist and ultranationalist political party founded on August 31, 2018. It was formed by supporters of 16th President Rodrigo Duterte, including some officers affiliated with the Citizen National Guard, a nationalist, anti-communist and anti-islamic political advocacy group, including party chairman and former Department of Education undersecretary Butch Valdes, President Ramon Pedrosa, Executive Vice President Nur-Ana Sahidulla, and Dr. Ricardo Fulgencio IV. The party had fielded former Lieutenant General Antonio Parlade Jr. in the 2022 presidential election, which he was disallowed to run by COMELEC.

Since the passing of the KDP Founding Chairman Antonio 'Butch' Valdes in 2022, he was replaced by the KDP Vice-President Carlos Enrique Gomez Valdes III as the new head of the national political party KDP.

The KDP is unrelated to the similarly named Katipunan ng mga Demokratikong Pilipino (Union of Democratic Filipinos), a United States–based Marxist–Leninist–Maoist group which had opposed the Ferdinand Marcos regime during the 1970s and 1980s.

== Political positions ==
KDP has been described as "ultra-right". KDP's electoral agenda for the 2019 elections were to "stop electoral fraud" by cancelling Smartmatic's contract with the Commission on Elections and reforming the electoral system, to prosecute those involved in the Dengvaxia controversy, and to reduce electrical bills by repealing the Electric Power Industry Reform Act (EPIRA) of 2001. Economic nationalism figures significantly in the party platform and covers shifting from a service economy to an agro-industrialized producer economy, food self-sufficiency and the integration of the Philippines into the Belt and Road Initiative. In addition, the party advocates a nonaligned, realist approach to foreign-policymaking, as well as federalism.

=== False claims on the Marcoses' stolen wealth ===
KDP's Facebook page posted false information regarding the Marcos family's stolen wealth. The group posted a video that made multiple false claims about Ferdinand and Imelda Marcos's Swiss bank accounts. The video also made misleading claims about the source of the Marcos's wealth. A fact check of the video's false claims said that, in fact, the Supreme Court ruled in 2003 that the assets in question were ill-gotten wealth or stolen money. The video received 28,000 interactions on KDP's Facebook page. Excerpts of KDP's incorrect video were shared by a Tiktok user in 2021 and generated 95,000 interactions and almost 876,000 views.

Researchers noted that after Bongbong Marcos announced his candidacy for the presidency, claims praising his father, President Ferdinand Marcos, and his authoritarian regime increased significantly.

== Candidates for the 2019 general election ==
=== Senatorial slate ===
Candidates	Party	Position	Votes	%	Rank	Elected?
Toti Casiño	KDP	None	580,853	1.23%	41	No
Glenn Chong	KDP	Member of the Philippine House of Representatives from Biliran's at-large district (2007–2010)	2,534,335	5.36%	31	No
Larry Gadon	KBL (Guest candidate from KBL)	None	3,487,780	7.37%	28	No
RJ Javellana	KDP	None	258,538	0.55%	63	No
Nur-Ana Sahidulla	KDP	Member of the Philippine House of Representatives from Sulu's 2nd district (2010–2013)	444,096	0.94%	47	No
Butch Valdez	KDP	None	367,851	0.78%	54	No

== Electoral performance ==
=== Presidential and vice presidential elections ===
Year	Presidential election			Vice presidential election		
Year	Candidate	Vote share	Result	Candidate	Vote share	Result
2022	Antonio Parlade Jr. (Note: Parlade Jr. was disqualified from the presidential race.)	N/A	Bongbong Marcos (PFP)	None		Sara Duterte (Lakas–CMD)

=== Legislative elections ===
Congress of the Philippines
House of Representatives			Senate			
Year	Seats won	Result	Year	Seats won	Ticket	Result
2019	0 / 304	PDP–Laban plurality	2019	0 / 12	Katipunan ng Demokratikong Pilipino	Hugpong ng Pagbabago win 9/12 seats
2022	Did not participate	PDP–Laban plurality	2022	Did not participate (Note: Katipunan ng Demokratikong Pilipino supported Larry Gadon, RJ Javellana, Rey Valeros and Nur-Ana Sahidulla's senatorial bid who all ran under other political parties or as independent candidates.)		UniTeam win 6/12 seats
2025	Did not participate	Lakas–CMD plurality	2025	Did not participate		Alyansa para sa Bagong Pilipinas win 6/12 seats
