= Dong Mangudadatu =

Filipino politician (born 1970)

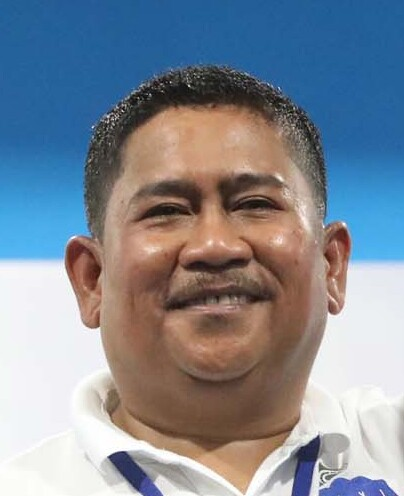
- Mangudadatu in 2019

Member of the House of Representatives from Maguindanao's 2nd District
- In office June 30, 2013 – June 30, 2019
- Preceded by: Simeon Datumanong
- Succeeded by: Esmael Mangudadatu

Mayor of Datu Piang, Maguindanao
- In office June 30, 2007 – June 30, 2013

Personal details
- Born: Datu Zajid Gaguil "Dong" Mangudadatu; October 10, 1970 (age 55) Mindanao, Philippines
- Party: UBJP (2021–present)
- Other political affiliations: PDP (2017–2021); Liberal (2012–2017); Lakas (2007–2012)
- Occupation: Politician

Datu Zajid Gaguil "Dong" Mangudadatu (October 10, 1970) is a Filipino politician who represented the Maguindanao's 2nd district from 2013 to 2019.

== Political career ==
Mangudadatu started his political career after being elected as Mayor of Datu Piang, Maguindanao, and served for two terms from 2007 to 2013. After mayoral, he was elected and served for two terms as 2nd District congressman of Maguindanao from 2013 until 2019.

He ran for senate in 2019, under Hugpong ng Pagbabago slate, but lost and placed 19th in overall tally.
