= Florin Hilbay =

Filipino lawyer (born 1974)

Florin T. Hilbay
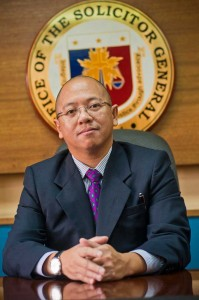
- Official Portrait

Dean of the Siliman University College of Law
- Incumbent
- Assumed office November 1, 2022
- Preceded by: Myles Nicholas Bejar

Solicitor General of the Philippines
- In office August 20, 2014 – June 30, 2016
- President: Benigno Aquino III
- Preceded by: Francis Jardeleza
- Succeeded by: Jose Calida

Personal details
- Born: March 19, 1974 (age 52) Tondo, Manila, Philippines
- Party: Independent (2021–present)
- Other political affiliations: Aksyon Demokratiko (2018–2021)
- Education: University of Santo Tomas (BA); University of the Philippines (LLB); Yale University (LLM)
- Profession: Lawyer

Florin "Pilo" Ternal Hilbay (born March 19, 1974) is a Filipino lawyer who served as the Solicitor General of the Philippines from 2014 to 2016. He acted as the Philippine agent in the international case, Philippines v. China, which nullified all historical claims of China in relation to the South China Sea dispute. He ranked first place in the 1999 Philippine Bar Examination.

He is a member of the faculty of the University of the Philippines College of Law since 2000, where he teaches Advanced Constitutional Litigation, Constitutional Law, and Philosophy of Law, with emphasis on issues relating to Church and State, post-colonial constitutionalism, and the relationship between the information environment and legal consciousness. He also taught Obligations & Contracts and Public Officers & Election Law.

== Early life and education ==
Hilbay was born in Tondo, Manila to mother Lydia Hilbay, a former househelp and elementary graduate, and Rodrigo Hilbay, a messenger and high school graduate. He finished his elementary education at the Holy Child Catholic School in Tondo, and his secondary education at the University of Santo Tomas Education High school. He earned his Bachelor of Arts degree in Economics from the University of Santo Tomas in 1995. He earned his law degree from the University of the Philippines College of Law and was admitted to the bar in 1999, placing first in the bar examinations. In 2005, Hilbay obtained his Masters of Law degree from Yale Law School.

He was a Fulbright Visiting Scholar at Boston College in 2001. He has also held fellowships at the Max Planck Institute for Comparative Public Law and International Law in Heidelberg, Germany, and at the Asian Law Institute for Comparative Public Law in the National University of Singapore, and in Silliman University.

== Early career ==
Hilbay topped the 1999 bar examination with a score of 88.5%, sharing the first place distinction with Edwin Enrile of Ateneo de Manila University. That year, only 16% or 660 of the 3,978 examinees passed the bar.

When the results came out on the same day as his birthday in March 2000, Hilbay was then working as an underbar clerk to Supreme Court Justice Vicente Mendoza, a noted constitutionalist who was a former solicitor from 1971 to 1973 and assistant solicitor general from 1973 to 1980.

Hilbay also previously joined the Office of the Solicitor General of the Philippines as an associate solicitor under Solicitor General Simeon V. Marcelo in 2002. He also served as the Director of the Institute of Government and Law Reform of the University of the Philippines Law Center; a consultant to the Commission on Elections; and as the vice-chair of Bantay Katarungan (Sentinels of Justice), a civic organization formed by former Senator Jovito Salonga, purposefully created to advocate and strengthen the rule of law, to address issues of public injustice and to oversee the appointments process in the judiciary.

He also served as the editor-in-chief of the Philippine Law and Society Review and an editor of the IBP Law Journal.

== Work as Solicitor General ==
Hilbay took over as acting Solicitor General on August 20, 2014, replacing Francis Jardeleza who was appointed as a Supreme Court Associate Justice. President Benigno Aquino III formally appointed Hilbay as Solicitor General on June 16, 2015.

As a senior state solicitor under Jardeleza, he defended the Reproductive Health Law before the Supreme Court in 2014. He was also the principal lawyer for the Enhanced Defense Cooperation Agreement (EDCA) and the Bangsamoro. He went on to become solicitor general.

As solicitor general, he served as the Philippines' agent in the arbitration proceeding in Philippines v. China filed with the Permanent Court of Arbitration in 2013. The court hearings began on July 7, 2015, and was ruled in favor of the Philippines on July 12, 2016. The court nullified all historical claims of China in the South China Sea via the nine-dash line.

== Constitutional Law Professor ==
Hilbay started working as a constitutional law professor at University of the Philippines after his term as Solicitor General in 2016. He has expressed his staunch dissent over the Philippine drug war, the extension of martial law in Mindanao, the House attempts to re-impose the death penalty, and the position of the Duterte administration on issues concerning China. He has been handling the case of detained senator Leila de Lima since February 2018. Hilbay is also part of Senator Antonio Trillanes’ legal team in opposing the government's nullification of the former soldier's amnesty.

He now serves as Dean of the Silliman University College of Law where he also launched his book on bitcoin.

== Political career ==
In October 2018, Hilbay filed his senatorial candidacy for the 2019 Philippine Senate election. He ran under the opposition coalition, Otso Diretso. His platform focuses on the government budget, social services, and sovereign rights of the Philippines in the South China Sea and Benham Rise. He was an official member and the official candidate of Aksyon Demokratiko, a progressive political party founded by senator Raul Roco. However, he lost and missed the top 12, placing 29th.

On October 18, 2021, Hilbay left Aksyon Demokratiko to support the presidential campaign of Vice President Leni Robredo.

== Writings ==
He authored a collection of essays entitled "Unplugging the Constitution" published and distributed by the University of the Philippines Press in 2009. The book, written between 2004 and 2005 while he was in Yale, tackled a wide range of issues. It discussed constitutional law, constitutional theory, philosophy of adjudication, legal hermeneutics, bar exams, the institution of marriage, psychological incapacity, liberal consciousness, and free speech. His theory on the Tort of Constitutional Negligence has been applied in suits for damages against former President Gloria Macapagal Arroyo.
