= Neri Colmenares =

Filipino human rights lawyer and activist

The Honorable Neri Colmenares
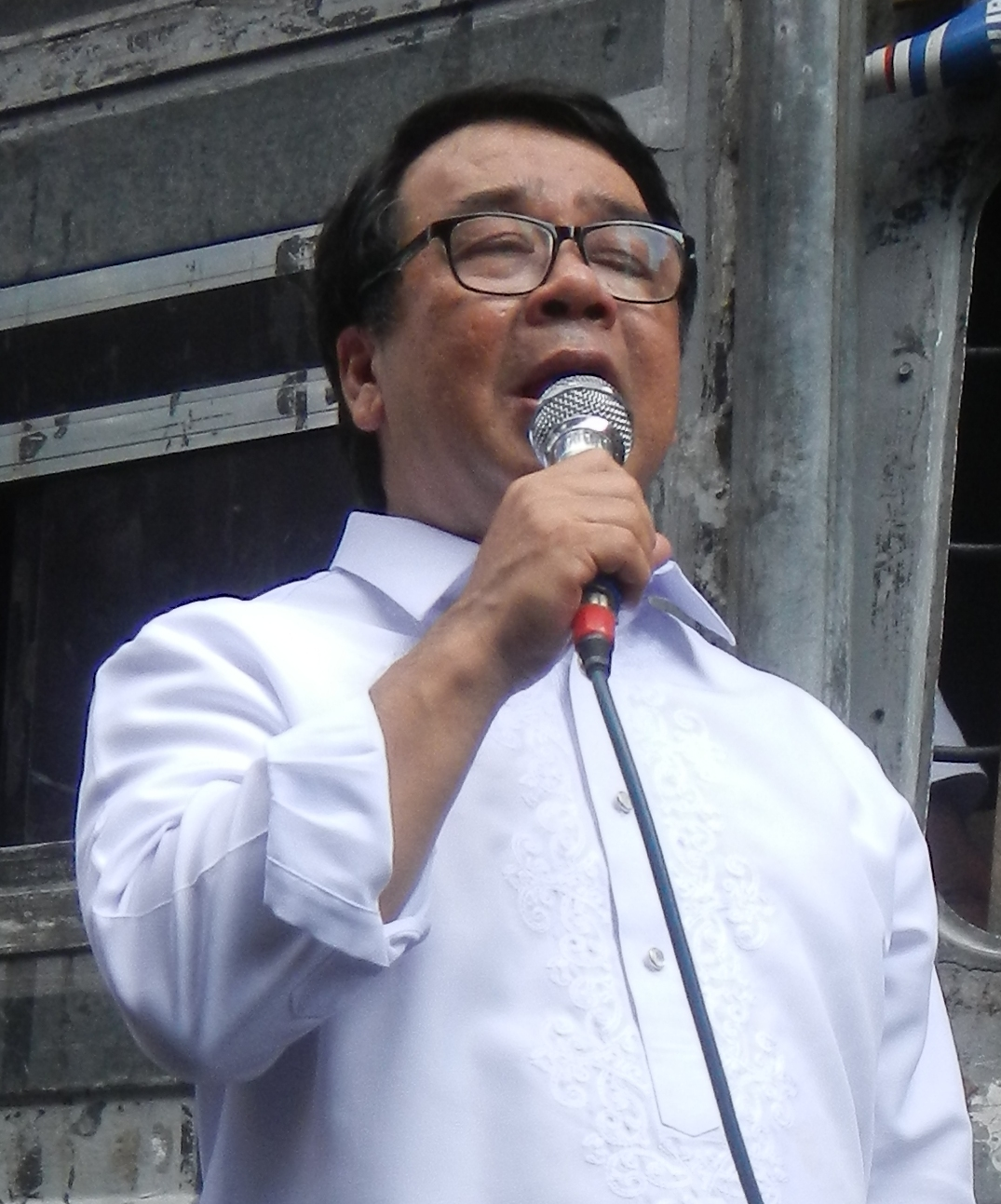
- Colmenares speaking at the protests against the burial of Ferdinand Marcos in 2016

House Deputy Minority Leader
- In office July 22, 2013 – June 30, 2016
- Leader: Ronaldo Zamora

Member of the House of Representatives for Bayan Muna
- In office April 2009 – June 30, 2016 Serving with Teodoro Casiño and Carlos Isagani Zarate

Personal details
- Born: December 4, 1959 (age 66) Bacolod, Negros Occidental, Philippines
- Party: Bayan Muna
- Other political affiliations: Makabayan
- Domestic partner: Shalimar Vitan
- Relations: Angel Locsin (aunt)
- Children: 1
- Education: San Beda College (BA); University of the Philippines Diliman (LL.B)
- Occupation: Politician
- Profession: Lawyer

Neri Javier Colmenares (Tagalog pronunciation: [haˈvjeɾ kɔlmɛˈnarɛs], born December 4, 1959) is a Filipino human rights lawyer, activist, and politician. He was an associate of the Asian Law Centre at Melbourne Law School when he was completing his Ph.D. in law on "The Writ of Amparo and the International Criminal Court." He also lectured at the University of Melbourne on International Human Rights Law and the Rome Statute of the International Criminal Court.

Colmenares was the party-list representative for Bayan Muna in the Philippine House of Representatives from 2009 to 2016, and has been its chairman since the 2010s. He was an aspirant in the 2016, 2019, and 2022 Philippine Senate elections, where he was part of the 1Sambayan Senate slate, but was defeated in all three runs.

== Early and personal life ==
Born on December 4, 1959 in Bacolod, Negros Occidental, Colmenares joined the struggle against the late former President Ferdinand Marcos' leadership in 1976. He was active in the College Editors Guild of the Philippines (CEGP) and the Student Christian Movement of the Philippines (SCMP), and became the Visayas regional chair of the Student Catholic Action (SCA). Soon after becoming a national council member of SCA, he was arrested. Following the end of his detention, Colmenares moved to Manila where he was involved in different religious organizations. Actress Angel Locsin (Angelica Locsin Colmenares in real life) is Colmenares' aunt, although he is 25 years older than her. Reports indicate that Locsin's father and Colmenares’ father are related, but no further details were provided about the matter.

In 1983 he shifted to Cagayan Valley to become a youth organizer there. After five months of organizing work in Cagayan Valley, he was arrested by military agents and charged with 'rebellion.' In total, Colmenares was jailed and was tortured in captivity for four years. Atty. William F. Claver stood as his legal counsel. Colmenares was one of the youngest political prisoners at the time.

=== Chess ===
Neri Colmenares learned to play chess at age 7. He was Palarong Pambansa champion in the Visayas and placed second in the Palarong Pambansa in 1976.

While in detention during martial law, he would play chess blindfolded against jail guards.

In 2015, Colmenares was the director of the National Chess Federation of the Philippines (NCFP) and chair its of its grassroots and development committee. He has been the vice president of the NCFP as of 2022.

== Legal career ==
Colmenares is a human rights lawyer and is the president of the National Union of Peoples' Lawyers (NUPL), a national association of human rights lawyers in the Philippines. He finished his Bachelor of Arts in Economics at San Beda College and completed his law degree at the University of the Philippines (UP) College of Law.

He lectures in Mandatory Continuing Legal Education (MCLE) seminars and in various universities on the Writ of Amparo, Habeas Data, The International Criminal Court and International Humanitarian Law, Oral Advocacy, Constitutional Amendment and the Chacha Cases, Judicial and Congressional Jurisprudence on Impeachment, The Party List Law: Jurisprudence of the Supreme Court and the Commission on Elections (Comelec), The Constitutionality of the Anti-Terrorism Law (Human Security Act), Whistleblowers and the Freedom of Information Law and other current legal and constitutional issues.

He is involved in constitutional legal issues, having acted as counsel and argued before the Supreme Court in oral arguments on the constitutionality of Executive Order 464, the petition against the Emergency Rule Proclamation 1017, the calibrated preemptive response (CPR) policy, the cha cha initiative to amend the Constitution, the petition to disqualify major political parties in the party list system, on the constitutionality of the Visiting Forces Agreement (the Subic Rape Case) and the oral arguments on the petition he filed against the First Party Rule which resulted in Supreme Court decision filling up of all the party list seats in Congress.

Colmenares has lectured extensively on various legal topics in Mandatory Continuing Legal Education (MCLE) seminars and at universities on impeachment jurisprudence, constitutional law, party-list system, appellate advocacy, writs of amparo and habeas data, international human rights law, and legal perspectives on the peace process. He has served as a resource speaker in national and international forums, including those organized by the Supreme Court of the Philippines and legal organizations abroad.

Colmenares has also held prominent leadership positions in legal advocacy groups, including serving as president and secretary general of the National Union of Peoples' Lawyers (NUPL). He has been a consistent advocate for human rights, social justice, and legal reforms through both his legal work and public engagements.

Colmenares began his career at the National Amnesty Commission, serving as a private secretary from November 1996 to January 1997, and again from January to September 1997. He then became the commission's legal officer from October 1997 to May 1998, and then became its attorney from January to September 1998 and again from May to September 1999. In September 1999, he became the General Counsel for the partylist Bayan Muna, a position he held until 2009. From March 2004 to March 2006, Colmenares also served as a consultant to the office of Representative Satur Ocampo.

== Political career ==
=== House of Representatives ===
He acted as counsel of the seven impeachment complaints in the House of Representatives of the Philippines and was one of the prosecutors in the impeachment trial of Ombudsman Merceditas Gutierrez in the Philippine Senate, prosecuting mainly the fertilizer scam case and the euro generals case. He was one of the prosecutors in the impeachment trial of Chief Justice Renato Corona, who was convicted by the Senate for Betrayal of Public Trust. Additionally, he has argued significant cases before the Supreme Court, including those questioning the constitutionality of key government actions, such as the Visiting Forces Agreement, party-list representation rules, and emergency powers under President Gloria Macapagal Arroyo.

==== Legislation ====
Colmenares authored several laws such as the (i) the law requiring warnings through text during typhoons and disasters (RA 10639); (ii) the law creating Special Election Precincts for persons with disabilities and senior citizens (RA 10633); (iii) the law allowing media to vote before election day (RA 10380); and human rights laws including the (iv) Reparation Law for human rights victims during Martial Law (10368); (v) the Anti-Torture Law (RA 9745); (vi) the Anti-Enforced Disappearance Law (RA 10353). He also authored the recently passed law on the practice of Nutrition and Dietetics (RA 10862). His party Bayan Muna voted NO against the TRAIN law and he has been campaigning for the suspension of the TRAIN law pending the repeal of its excise tax imposition.

He authored the Social Security System (SSS) Pension Increase bill, which was later implemented under Pres. Rodrigo Duterte who ordered a P1,000 per month increase in SSS pension in two tranches. Colmenares and Bayan Muna worked to have the second P1,000 increase in 2018.

He authored the bills and resolutions on making annulment of marriage accessible to the poor, increasing SSS pension to P7,000, investigating high prices of gasoline in the provinces, and blind-friendly Philippine peso bills.

==== Committee assignments ====
During the 15th Congress, he was a member of the Joint Congressional Oversight Committee on Automated Elections and Vice-Chairman of the House Suffrage Committee and member of the Foreign Affairs, Defense, Natural Resources, Trade and Industry, Constitutional Amendment, Local Government, Human Rights, and Revision of Laws Committees.

=== Post-congressional career ===
On September 23, 2021, Colmenares announced that he will be running for senator in 2022. He filed his candidacy on October 7. However, he lost the election for the third straight time.

On December 4, 2024, Colmenares and 74 others filed the second impeachment complaint against Vice President Sara Duterte, citing betrayal of public trust for her office's alleged misuse of confidential funds. By February 2025, it was consolidated with two other complaints into a single impeachment complaint and signed by 240 lawmakers out of 305, reaching the 1/3 votes threshold and impeaching Vice President Duterte.

On January 26, 2026, Colmenares and 35 others filed the second impeachment complaint against President Bongbong Marcos, citing his potential involvement in the "BBM Parametric Formula" used by the Department of Public Works and Highways, which they alleged to have allowed systemic corruption in government, as well as his alleged involvement in kickback schemes and unprogrammed appropriations. A week later on February 2, Colmenares was also among the complainants who filed the first new impeachment complaint against Vice President Duterte since the Supreme Court ruling that deemed prior impeachment attempts against her to be unconstitutional.

== Political positions ==
=== Energy ===
Colmenares petitioned the Supreme Court to stop Meralco's record-high power rate hike after the 2013 Malampaya shutdown. At the 2014 congressional committee hearings on the electricity rate hike, Colmenares refuted arguments by Manila Electric Company (Meralco) legal counsel who stated that Meralco did not raise prices intentionally.

He again questioned Meralco's plans to raise electricity rates in 2019 and accused power companies of passing on to consumers the cost of shortages they themselves caused.

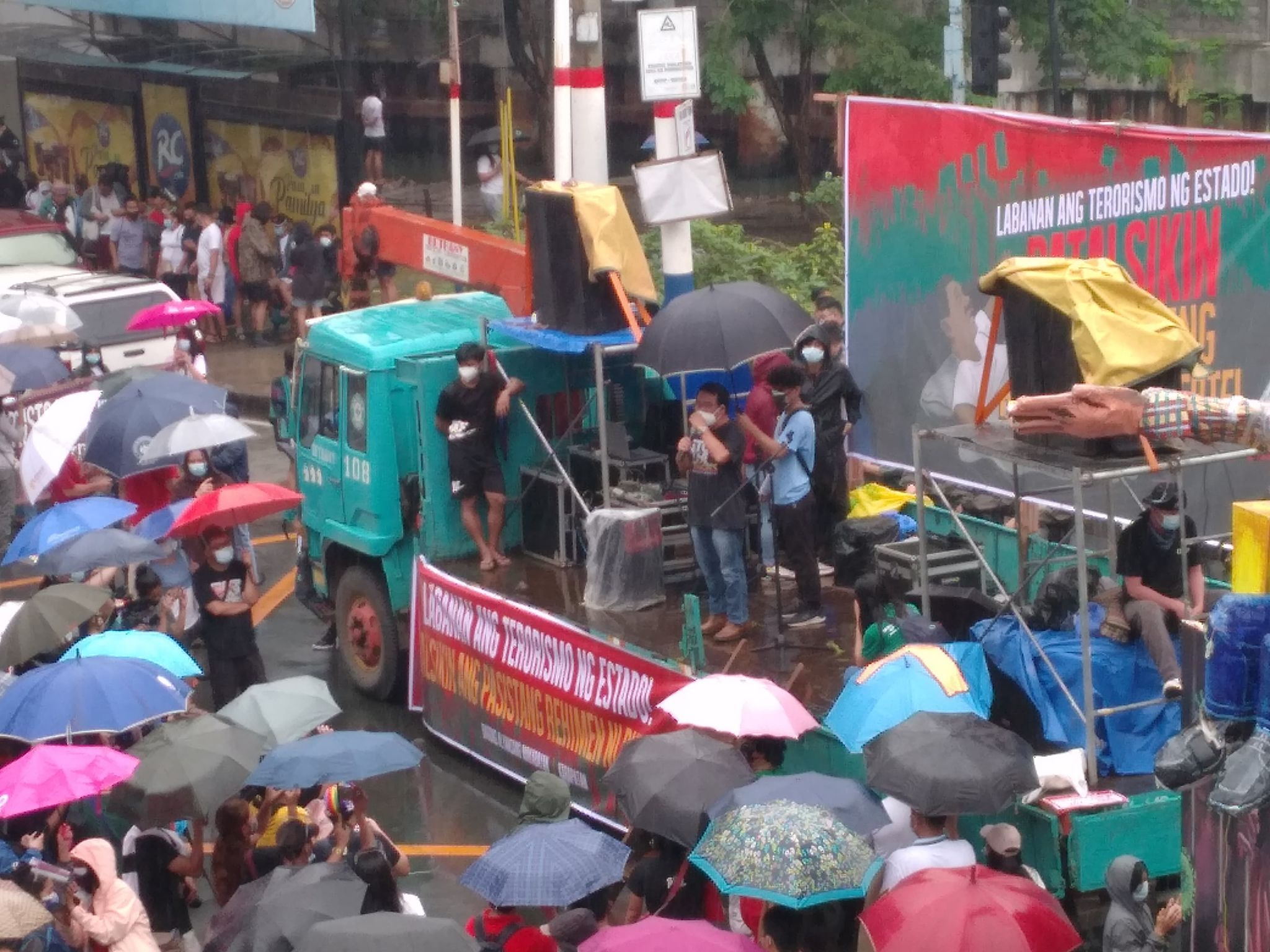
Neri Colmenares, speaking at the International Human Rights Day protest in Manila, December 10, 2020.

=== Ferdinand Marcos ===
Colmenares argued before the Supreme Court to stop the heroes burial for the late former president and dictator Ferdinand Marcos in 2016. He also argued before the District Court in Hawaii on the Marcos human rights case.

=== China ===
In a petition filed before the Supreme Court in 2008, Colmenares questioned the legality of the Joint Marine Seismic Undertaking (JMSU) that the Arroyo administration signed with China and Vietnam. In 2014, Colmenares filed a motion for immediate resolution before the Supreme Court, citing the original petition's importance in light of the Philippines' territorial and maritime dispute with China. Colmenares filed another motion for immediate resolution on the petition in 2018. The motion read, "Any joint exploration with any foreign country or entity that allows almost absolute control over the benefits of the exploration to such foreign country or entity is detrimental to the Filipino people and therefore must not be allowed."

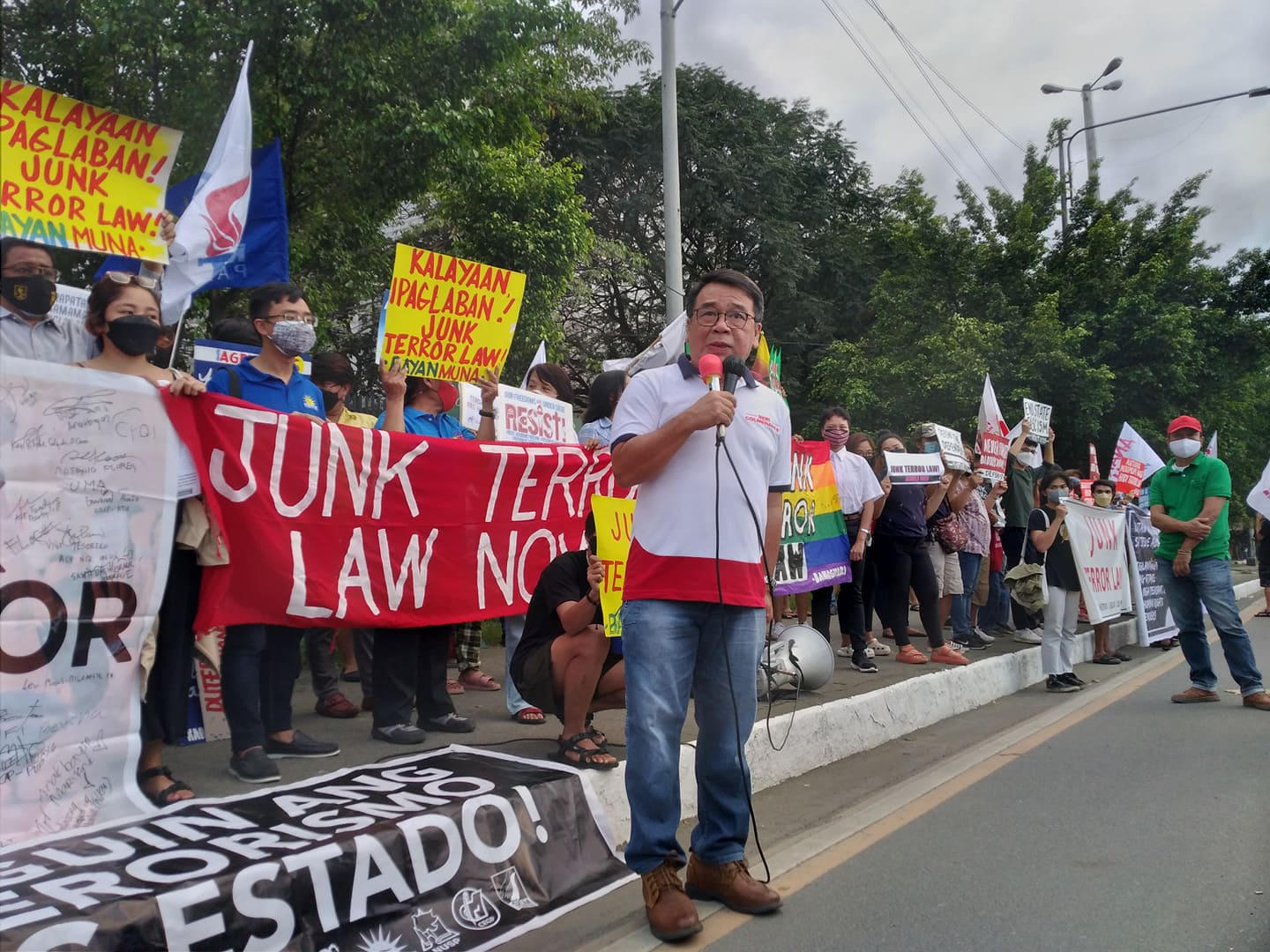
Colmenares, speaking at a mobilization against the Anti-Terrorism Act of 2020, December, 2021

Colmenares questioned the Philippines' Chico River irrigation loan agreement with China in 2019. He joined fellow lawmakers in petitioning the Supreme Court in stopping the Chinese-funded project.

=== Taxes ===
Colmenares and fellow lawmakers noted how the fuel excise tax and the broader value added tax hit the poor and low-income earners. He protested the Tax Reform of Inclusion and Acceleration and Inclusion (TRAIN) Law and the fuel excise tax and blamed these for the increasing prices of consumer goods. He also called for the removal of the value added tax on power, water, and fuel.

Colmenares served as counsel for lawmakers who in January 2018 filed for the suspension of the TRAIN Law. He also noted how the TRAIN Law was passed in Congress without a quorum.

=== War on drugs ===
Colmenares serves as legal counsel to Philippine drug war victims and their families. In 2021, Colmenares was a panelist at a legal forum organized by the University of the Philippines College of Law on the International Criminal Court investigation in the Philippines. He was also a resource speaker at the 2024 House of Representatives Quad Committee hearings that investigated the possible links between the drug war, extrajudicial killings in the Philippines, and Philippine Offshore Gaming Operators.

== Scholarly and editorial work ==
Colmenares' papers include a primer on the Writ of Habeas Data, the Comparative Analysis of the Writ of Amparo, Impeachment as a Constitutional Accountability Mechanism, the Party List system Law, and the International Criminal Court and other articles for the Philippine Law Journal.

He was associate editor of the World Bulletin of the UP Law Center on the issue of international crimes.

== Electoral history ==
Electoral history of Neri Colmenares
Year	Office	Party	Votes received				Result
Year	Office	Party	Total	%	P.	Swing	Result
2007	Representative (Party-list)	Bayan Muna	979,189	6.11%	2nd	—N/a	Won
2010	Representative (Party-list)	Bayan Muna	750,100	2.49%	9th	-3.62	Won
2013	Representative (Party-list)	Bayan Muna	954,724	3.45%	3rd	+0.96	Won
2025	Representative (Party-list)	Bayan Muna	162,894	0.39%	77th	-3.06	Lost
2016	Senator of the Philippines	Makabayan	6,484,985	14.42%	20th	—N/a	Lost
2019	Senator of the Philippines	Makabayan	4,683,942	9.90%	24th	-4.52	Lost
2022	Senator of the Philippines	Makabayan	6,098,782	10.98%	24th	+1.08	Lost

== Awards ==
In 2020, Colmenares was given the International Bar Association (IBA) Award for his "Outstanding Contribution to Human Rights".
