= Magdalo Group =

Filipino mutineers (c. 2003–2008)

- Flag used by the Group
- Other name: Bagong Katipuneros (lit. New Katipuneros)
- Leader: Antonio Trillanes IV
- Dates active: c. 2003–2008
- Country: Philippines
- Ideology: Conservatism; Filipino nationalism Anti-communism
- Political position: Right-wing to far-right

The Magdalo Group was a group of dissident soldiers who staged the unsuccessful Oakwood mutiny. Made up of junior officers of all branches of the Armed Forces of the Philippines (AFP), the group took over the Oakwood Premier Ayala Center in Makati and demanded the resignation of senior officers in the AFP and members of the Arroyo government, including the President herself. The group called themselves "Bagong Katipuneros" (Filipino, "New Katipuneros"), but the Philippine press continued referring to them as the Magdalo Group.

On August 30, 2007, the Philippine National Police went on alert against an alleged Magdalo recruitment try in Bicol, targeting the Army's 9th Infantry Division. The effort was supposedly related to alleged destabilization efforts planned for the forthcoming promulgation by the Sandiganbayan on the plunder case against former President Joseph Estrada.

== Offshoot groups ==
After the administration of President Gloria Macapagal Arroyo, members of the Magdalo group shifted towards civic work.

=== Samahang Magdalo ===
The Samahang Magdalo is a civilian volunteer group launched by the Magdalo Group in 2008. The group uses social networking websites such as Friendster and Facebook to recruit supporters across the Philippines.

=== Magdalo Party-list ===
The Samahang Magdalo established the Magdalo Party-List and sought party-list representation in the House of Representatives.

== See also ==
- Reform Party (Philippines), a political party founded by James Layug, a Magdalo soldier
