= Manila Peninsula siege =

2007 standoff in Makati, Philippines

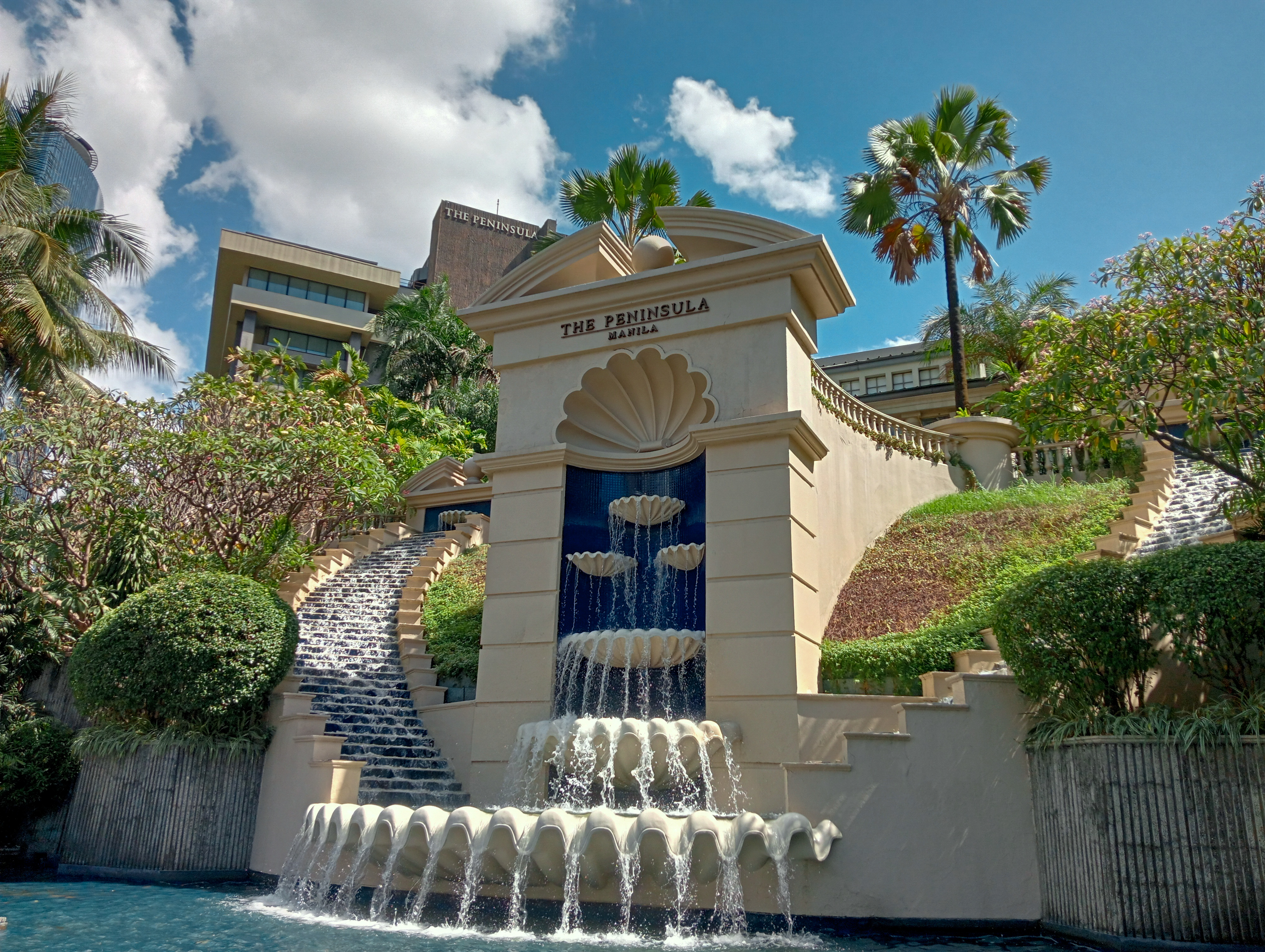
- The Peninsula Manila as seen from Ayala cor. Makati Avenue, where the rebellion took place.
Date	November 29, 2007
Location	Makati, Metro Manila, Philippines
Result	Philippine government victory: Several members of the Magdalo Group were arrested.

Government-Insurgents
Government of the Philippines	Bagong Katipuneros (Magdalo Group)

Commanders and leaders
(Philippines) Gloria Macapagal Arroyo (Philippines) Gen. Hermogenes Esperon (Philippines) Gen. Avelino Razon (Philippines) Gen. Geary Barias	Sen. Antonio Trillanes IV; Danilo Lim; Teofisto Guingona, Jr. Nicanor Faeldon

Military support
Armed Forces of the Philippines: Philippine Marine Corps; Light Reaction Regiment; Philippine National Police: Special Action Force	Defectors from the Armed Forces of the Philippines and Philippine National Police; Civilian volunteers

The Manila Peninsula siege occurred on November 29, 2007, at The Peninsula Manila hotel in Makati, Philippines. Senator Antonio Trillanes IV, Brigadier General Danilo Lim, and 25 other Magdalo Group officers walked out of their trial for the 2003 Oakwood mutiny coup attempt and marched through the streets of Makati. The mutineers called for the ousting of President Gloria Macapagal Arroyo, and seized the Rizal function room on the second floor of the Manila Peninsula Hotel along Ayala Avenue. Former Vice-president Teofisto Guingona, Jr. as well as some of the soldiers from the Armed Forces of the Philippines joined the march to the hotel.

After several hours, Trillanes and Lim surrendered to government forces after a military armored personnel carrier barged into the glass door of the hotel lobby and the hotel walls and windows sustained weapons damage. Trillanes and the mutineers were arrested while several journalists covering the event were detained. The journalists were subsequently released.

== Occupation ==
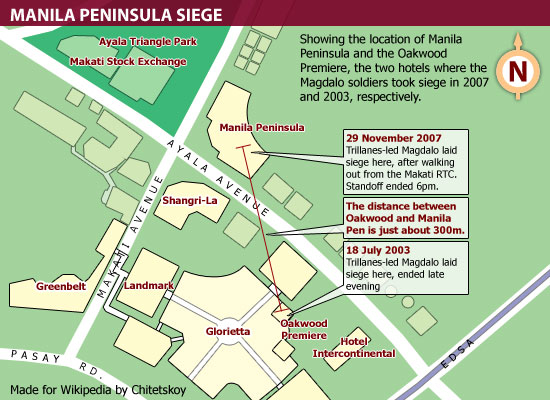
The Oakwood Premiere and The Peninsula Manila in Makati, sites of the Magdalo mutiny of 2003 and 2007, respectively.

Al Jazeera's coverage of the siege.

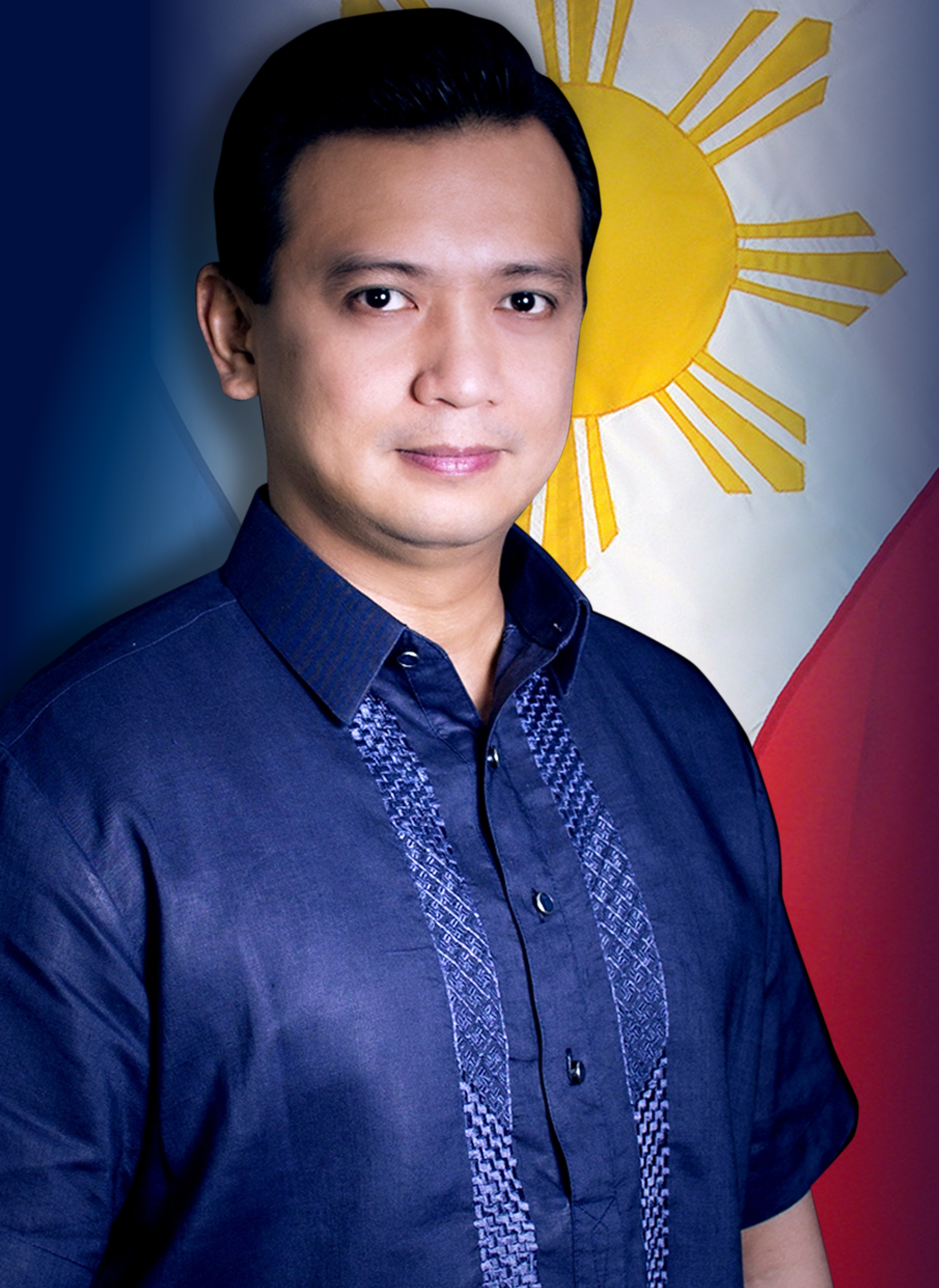
Senator Antonio Trillanes, leader of the mutiny.

Marine Captain Nicanor Faeldon, who escaped during the siege.

On November 29, 2007, led by Sen. Antonio Trillanes IV and Army Brig. Gen. Danilo Lim, thirty soldiers with armed guards, on trial for the 2003 Oakwood Mutiny, walked out of court and marched towards the luxury Manila Peninsula Hotel in Makati, the financial hub of the Philippine capital Manila. They were joined by former vice-president Teofisto Guingona, Jr., who called the gathering "New EDSA". They were also joined by other military personnel and civilians carrying M-16 or M-14 rifles. The soldiers, some carrying and wearing Magdalo (mutineers) flags and pins, marched along Makati Avenue and occupied the hotel's second floor. Sen. Trillanes and Brig. Gen. Lim stayed in the Rizal function room negotiating most of the time.

President Gloria Macapagal-Arroyo called for an emergency Cabinet meeting as she returned to Malacañang Palace aboard a helicopter amid tight security. Novaliches Catholic Bishop Antonio Tobias, Infanta Bishop Emeritus Julio Labayen, Jimmy Regalario of the Kilusang Makabansang Ekonomiya, Father Robert Reyes, and former University of the Philippines president Francisco Nemenzo joined Trillanes's group, as Executive Secretary Eduardo Ermita and Presidential Spokesperson and Press Secretary Ignacio Bunye rushed back to Malacañang. The Presidential Security Group sealed off the Palace while troops secured the North and South Luzon Expressways. A website soon appeared, proclaiming Lim and Trillanes as the leaders of the coup. The website entry read:

"Senator Antonio Trillanes, Brig. Gen. Danilo Lim, Magdalo soldiers, their guards and the people have started marching towards Makati triangle. [...] We presently find in existence a dangerous concept where the armed forces now owe their primary allegiance and loyalty to those who temporarily exercise the authority of the executive branch of the government rather than to the country and the Constitution they have sworn to protect. That is a concept we defy and struggle to eradicate. If you believe you are a man of will and courage with unselfish motives and brave enough to fight against such tyranny, rise up and be counted!"

The Philippine National Police (PNP) declared a red alert status in Metro Manila as a result of the incident.

At 2:46 pm PHT, Police Director Geary Barias, chief of the National Capital Region Police Office, ordered everyone inside the hotel to vacate.

Mariano Garchitorena, the Manila Peninsula’s public manager, stated that there was no trouble with Trillanes and his men, saying that: "They did not abuse our hotel staff. They were very gentlemanly in their act. They did not bother our staff and they did not bother our guests; He (Trillanes) assured us that they meant no harm to civilian to guests and all our staff of course."

== Siege and assault ==
The Armed Forces of the Philippines rushed at least three battalions of infantry, consisting of roughly 1,500 troops, to Makati to crush the revolt. The Philippine Marines said it was loyal to the chain of command and would help crush the rebellion. The Marines sent three armored personnel carriers and two trucks of troops to Makati to support police and military units in the area.

Judge Oscar Pimentel of the Makati Regional Trial Court, issued an arrest warrant and Director Barias stated "Arrests will be made at 3 p.m." The PNP gave Trillanes and Lim until this time to surrender, as it evacuated guests and personnel inside the hotel. Lim stated: "We make this fateful step of removing Mrs. Macapagal Arroyo from the presidency and undertake the formation of a new government."

The planned assault was held off until 3:58 p.m. At 3:58 p.m., 50 Special Action Force commandos lined up outside the hotel to enforce the arrest of rebel soldiers. The commandos, who were carrying gas masks, went into formation after rebel soldiers refused to accept warrants for their arrest. There were indications that the armed rebel soldiers inside the hotel were ready for battle.

Armored personnel carriers and Armoured fighting vehicles (AFV) of the police and the military were also dispatched around the hotel. The movement intensified after 4 p.m., when policemen in full-battle gear fired warning shots as they prepared to storm the hotel. Footage taken by ABS-CBN Sky Patrol showed Special Action Force commandos moving in battle formation towards the hotel.

Glass on the windows was broken to allow the dispersal of tear gas to those held up inside the hotel. Afterwards, an exchange of fire was heard between the military and the rebels. Firing stopped at 4:30 p.m. Bishop Julio Labayen appealed: "Please do not storm the place.. so nobody gets hurt." (4:37 p.m.) Various TV and radio crews, as well as other media personnel, were trapped in the hotel, while the Palace appealed to media and the public to stay away from Makati.

The AFV broke into the hotel lobby at 5:10 p.m., with soldiers pouring inside. Trillanes and Lim decided to surrender to the authorities to avoid loss of lives as several journalists and other civilians were with them. Director Geary Barias declared that the standoff at the hotel was over as the mutinous soldiers agreed to leave and surrender to Barias after the 6 hour siege (5:30 p.m.).

== Arrests ==
By 6 p.m., Trillanes, Lim, and their cohorts, and Guingona were arrested by the PNP and were sent to National Capital Region Police Office (NCRPO) headquarters in Camp Bagong Diwa, Taguig. ABS-CBN News and Current Affairs, Bloomberg, NHK, DWIZ, Manila Bulletin and Malaya journalists who were covering the event were also arrested. All of them were asked to leave their belongings and to not bring anything with them. They were advised by a lawyer not to talk as what the police were doing was against the law and violated their rights. Fr. Reyes and Bishop Labayen were also seen boarding the same bus with the arrested journalists. The Special Action Force was involved in arresting Lim.

Trillanes said he was ready to face whatever charges the government will give him.

In a TV interview with ABS-CBN, Defense Secretary Gilberto Teodoro defended the arrests of media reporters as the arresting officers "didn't know the journalists and may have mistaken them as renegade soldiers," although several of these journalists were hosting several prominent TV programs. Several journalists, mostly from TV and radio, were released from the NCRPO HQ.

A curfew from midnight to 5 am was implemented in the regions of Metro Manila, Central Luzon, and Calabarzon on the night of November 29–30.

== Aftermath ==
The PNP ordered a manhunt for the soldiers who escaped from the hotel, including Marine Captain Nicanor Faeldon; meanwhile, several persons of interest were detained at Camp Bagong Diwa. Several journalists were also "processed" at Camp Bagong Diwa and were subsequently released. On December 1, fifty individuals, including Trillanes, were charged of rebellion at inquest proceedings.

On December 3, the Peninsula Manila became fully operational with an estimated damage at US$1.2 million. The next day, Armed Forces chief-of-staff Hermogenes Esperon announced the arrest of communist New People’s Army operative Myrna Hombrebueno claiming that she and her group were connected with the Magdalos. Had Trillanes succeeded, according to Esperon, a National Transition Council (NTC), allegedly would replace the Arroyo administration, and the country put under a "lean and mean" military and police force (per 5-page document – "Proposed Program"). PNP Chief Avelino Razon revealed that a "female press reporter" provided Faeldon a fake press I.D. card that enabled his escape and that he was still inside Metro Manila. Razon also sacked the Makati police chief for failure to prevent the walk-out.

Faeldon surrendered to military authorities in 2010. He was later amnestied by President Benigno Aquino III and subsequently became head of the Bureau of Customs and later the Bureau of Corrections during the administration of President Rodrigo Duterte.

The Makati Regional Trial Court, upon receiving the cases on December 6, dismissed the cases against Guingona, Reyes, and other civilians, on December 13.

On December 20, 2010, Trillanes was temporarily released. He was later granted amnesty by President Benigno Aquino III, which led to the dismissal of all charges against him relating to the rebellion on September 21, 2011.

Trillanes was reelected in 2013 and became a fierce critic of Aquino's successor as president, Rodrigo Duterte. In 2018, Duterte signed Proclamation No. 572, revoking Trillanes's amnesty. However, the Makati Regional Trial Court denied the government's petition to have Trillanes arrested, saying the coup d'état case against the senator was already dismissed following his amnesty in 2011, and that the dismissal was "final and executory".

== Reactions ==
Some leading politicians expressed sympathy with Trillanes' demands for reforms and change but insisted that it should be done legally. Sen. Jamby Madrigal, who was the biggest campaign contributor for Trillanes' senatorial campaign said she was parting ways with him. Chief Justice Reynato Puno said that he was not interested in a proposal to head a caretaker government if President Arroyo was removed from power. The Catholic Bishops' Conference of the Philippines warned the rebellion and the government's response to it was a preview to Martial Law.

Media organizations such as the Foreign Correspondents Association of the Philippines (FOCAP), the National Union of Journalists of the Philippines (NUJP) and the Philippine Press Institute criticized the treatment of journalists by the PNP after the siege. The PNP leadership apologized to media representatives and crew, but denied that their response was "overkill".

The United States announced its continued support for Arroyo's government and said it was disturbed at extraconstitutional attempts at regime change in the Philippines.

== See also ==
- Siege of the Manila Hotel
