= Magdalo Party-List =

Philippine political organization

Magdalo
- — Philippine partylist —
- Full name: Magdalo Para sa Pilipino Sectoral Party Organization
- Sector(s) represented: Multi-sectoral
- Founder: Samahang Magdalo
- Founded: July 27, 2010; 16 years ago
- Headquarters: Quezon City, Metro Manila
- Ideology: Filipino nationalism
- Political position: Centre

Current representation (20th Congress)
- Seats in the House of Representatives: 0 / 3 (Out of 63 party-list seats)

Website
- magdalo.org

The Magdalo Para sa Pilipino Sectoral Party Organization, also known as the Magdalo Para sa Pilipino or Magdalo Party-List, is a political party in the Philippines. Magdalo seeks to represent the retired personnel of the Armed Forces of the Philippines and their families, as well as the urban poor and the youth.

The organization was established by the Samahang Magdalo on July 27, 2010, in Quezon City, Metro Manila. Samahang Magdalo itself had links to the Magdalo Group, which led the Oakwood Mutiny and Manila Peninsula siege with both efforts to remove then-President Gloria Macapagal Arroyo from her post.

The Magdalo Party-List was re-endorsed by former senator and retired navy officer Antonio "Sonny" Trillanes during the 2016 election, while he was running for the vice presidency of the Philippines. He also ran under the organization during the 2013 Senate election.

After being unable to win for two consecutive party list elections (in 2022 and 2025), Magdalo Party-List was delisted by the Commission on Elections.

== Electoral performance ==
=== Presidential and vice presidential ===
Year	Presidential election				Vice presidential election			
Year	Candidate	Votes	Vote share	Result	Candidate	Votes	Vote share	Result
2010	None (Note: Supported Manny Villar of Nacionalista)			Benigno Aquino III (Liberal)	None (Note: Supported Mar Roxas of Liberal)			Jejomar Binay (PDP–Laban)
2016	None (Note: Supported Grace Poe of Partido Galing at Puso)			Rodrigo Duterte (PDP–Laban)	Antonio Trillanes (Note: Trillanes ran as an independent candidate, while remaining a member of the Nacionalista Party.)	868,501	2.11%	Leni Robredo (Liberal)
2022	None (Note: Endorsed Leni Robredo who is an Independent)			Bongbong Marcos (PFP)	None (Note: Endorsed Francis Pangilinan of Liberal)			Sara Duterte (Lakas–CMD)

=== House of Representatives party-list elections ===
Election	Votes	%	Seats
2013	567,426	2.05%	2
2016	279,356	0.86%	1
2019	248,926	0.90%	1
2022	119,189	0.32%	0
2025	78,984	0.19%	0

=== Representatives to Congress ===
Period	1st Representative	2nd Representative	3rd Representative
16th Congress; 2013–2016	Gary Alejano	Francisco Ashley Acedillo	
17th Congress; 2016–2019	Gary Alejano		
18th Congress; 2019–2022	Manuel DG. Cabochan III		
