= 2016 Philippine presidential election in Ilocos Norte =

- May 9, 2016
- Registered: 378,786
- Turnout: 85.31%
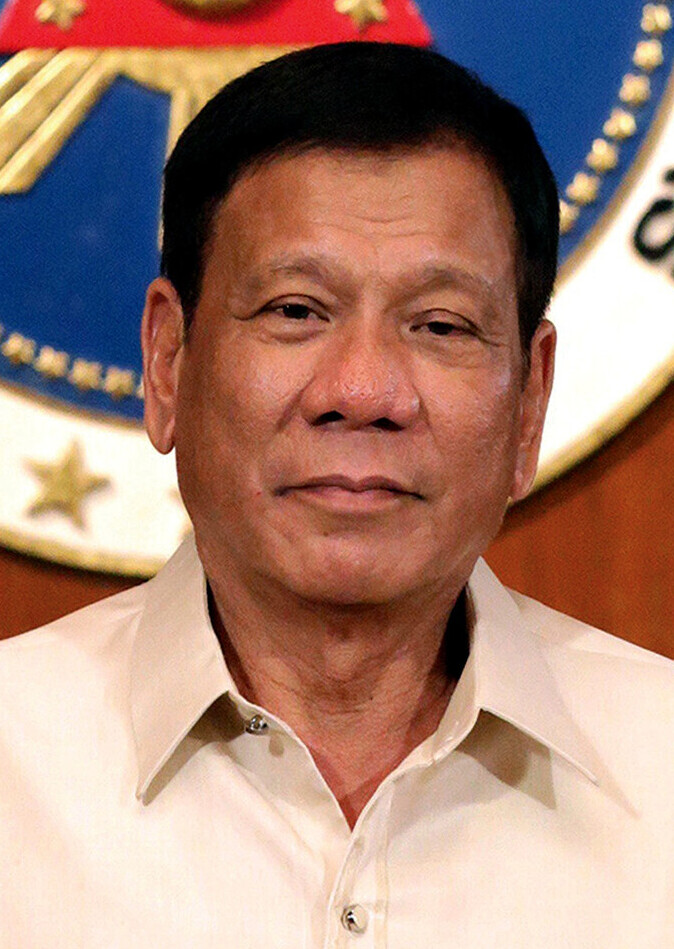

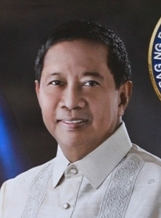

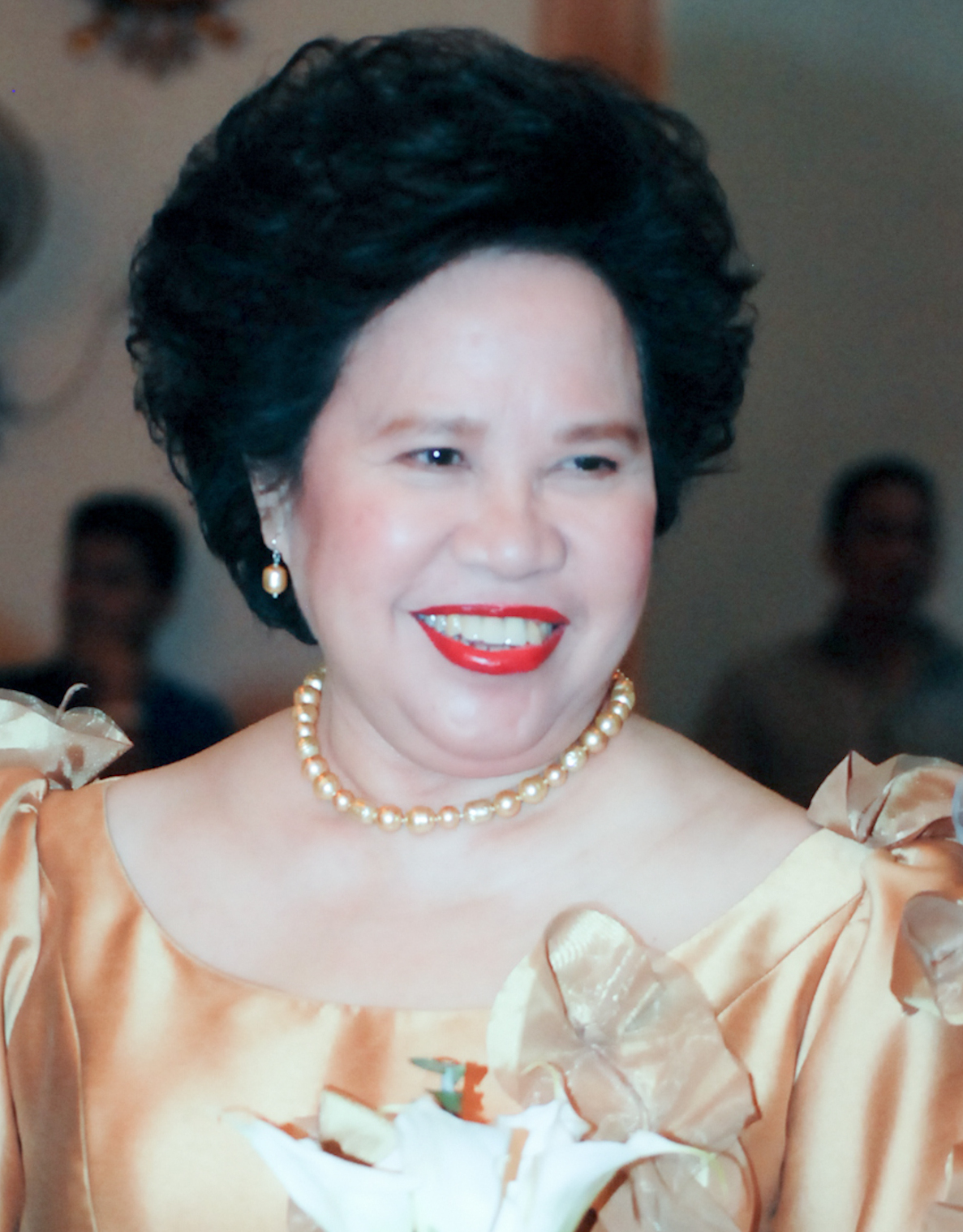

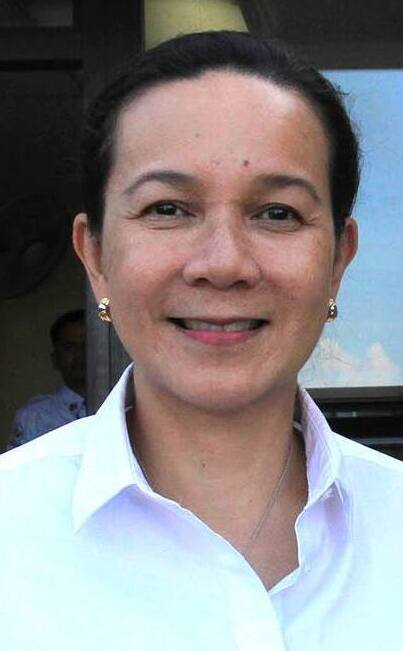
Candidate	Rodrigo Duterte	Jejomar Binay
Party	PDP–Laban	UNA
Running mate	Alan Peter Cayetano	Gregorio Honasan
Popular vote	103,394	66,007
Percentage	33.57%	21.43%
Candidate	Miriam Defensor Santiago	Grace Poe
Party	PRP	Independent
Alliance		PGP
Running mate	Bongbong Marcos	Francis Escudero
Popular vote	64,375	61,012
Percentage	20.90%	19.81%
President before election
Benigno Aquino III
Liberal
Elected President
Rodrigo Duterte
PDP–Laban
- 2022 Philippine vice presidential election in Ilocos Norte
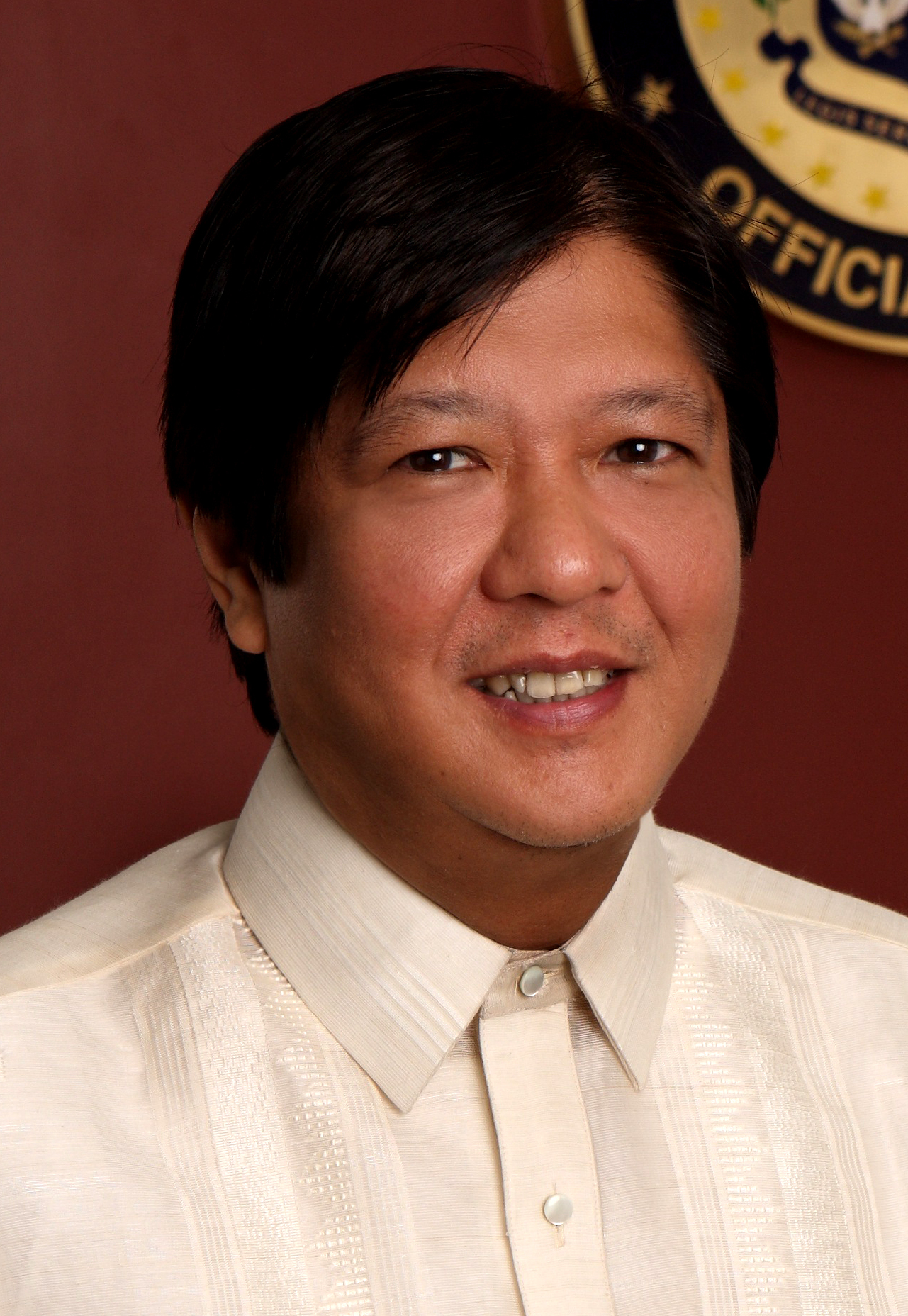

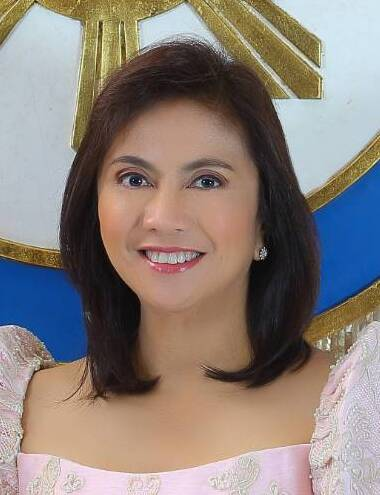
Candidate	Bongbong Marcos	Leni Robredo
Party	Independent	Liberal
Alliance		KDM
Popular vote	298,786	3,704
Percentage	96.82%	1.20%
Vice President before election
Jejomar Binay
UNA
Elected Vice President
Leni Robredo
Liberal

The 2016 Philippine presidential and vice presidential elections in Ilocos Norte were held on Monday, May 9, 2016, as part of the 2016 Philippine general election in which all 81 provinces, all 145 cities, and all 1,489 municipalities participated. Voters voted the president and the vice president separately.

Davao City mayor Rodrigo Duterte won in the province of Ilocos Norte against Vice president Jejomar Binay, Senators Miriam Defensor Santiago and Grace Poe, and DILG Secretary Mar Roxas.

This is the only province in the Ilocos Region in which Duterte won.

Senator Bongbong Marcos and the Marcos family is based from Ilocos Norte and is a part of the Solid North. Marcos won this year's vice presidential race with 96.82% of the vote, being the biggest landslide in a province. Marcos defeated Camarines Sur representative Leni Robredo, Senators Francis Escudero, Gregorio Honasan, Alan Peter Cayetano, and Antonio Trillanes.

== Electoral system ==
According to the Constitution of the Philippines, the elections are held every six years after 1992, on the second Monday of May. The incumbent president is term-limited and ineligible for re-election. The incumbent vice president is eligible to run for re-election and may run for two consecutive terms. The plurality voting system is used to determine the winner: the candidate with the highest number of votes, whether or not one has a majority, wins the presidency. The vice presidential election is a separate election, is held on the same rules, and voters may split their ticket. Both winners will serve six-year terms commencing on the noon of June 30, 2016, and ending on the same day six years later.

== Candidates ==
List of Presidential and Vice Presidential candidates on the ballot
Presidential candidate		Vice presidential candidate		Campaign
Candidate name and party	Position	Candidate name and party	Position	Campaign
Jejomar Binay UNA	Vice President	Gregorio Honasan UNA	Senator	(campaign)
Miriam Defensor Santiago PRP	Senator	Bongbong Marcos Independent (Note: Cayetano, Marcos and Trillanes are all members of the Nacionalista Party, but failed to get that party's nomination; instead, all of them ran as independents.)	Senator	(campaign)
Rodrigo Duterte PDP–Laban	Mayor of Davao City	Alan Peter Cayetano Independent	Senator	(campaign)
Grace Poe Independent	Senator	Francis Escudero Independent	Senator	(campaign)
Mar Roxas Liberal	Former secretary of the Interior and Local Government	Leni Robredo Liberal	House representative from Camarines Sur's 3rd district	(campaign)
None		Antonio Trillanes Independent	Senator	

== Results ==
A total of 323,138 voters came out to vote out of the 378,786 registered voters in the province.

=== Presidential result ===
2016 Philippine presidential election in Ilocos Norte (Note: The 253 votes for Roy Señeres are not listed here as they are deemed Invalid.)
Party	Candidate	Votes	%
PDP–Laban	Rodrigo Duterte	103,394	33.57%
UNA	Jejomar Binay	66,007	21.43%
PRP	Miriam Defensor Santiago	64,375	20.90%
Independent	Grace Poe	61,012	19.81%
Liberal	Mar Roxas	13,162	4.27%
Total votes		307,950	100.00%

=== Vice presidential result ===
2016 Philippine vice presidential election in Ilocos Norte
Party	Candidate	Votes	%
Independent	Bongbong Marcos	298,786	96.82%
Liberal	Leni Robredo	3,704	1.20%
Independent	Francis Escudero	2,479	0.80%
UNA	Gregorio Honasan	1,680	0.54%
Independent	Alan Peter Cayetano	1,326	0.43%
Independent	Antonio Trillanes	619	0.20%
Total votes		307,626	100.00%
