= 2016 Philippine presidential election in Cavite =

- May 9, 2016
- Registered: 1,843,163
- Turnout: 75.43%
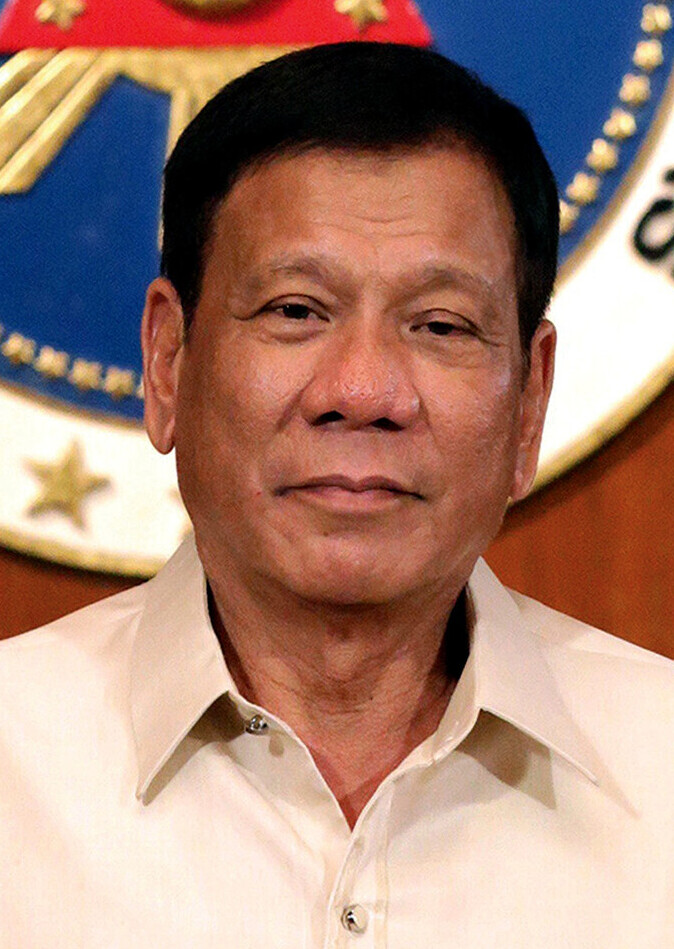

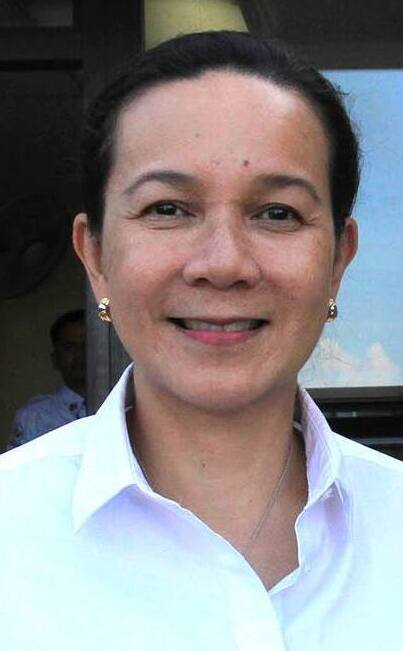

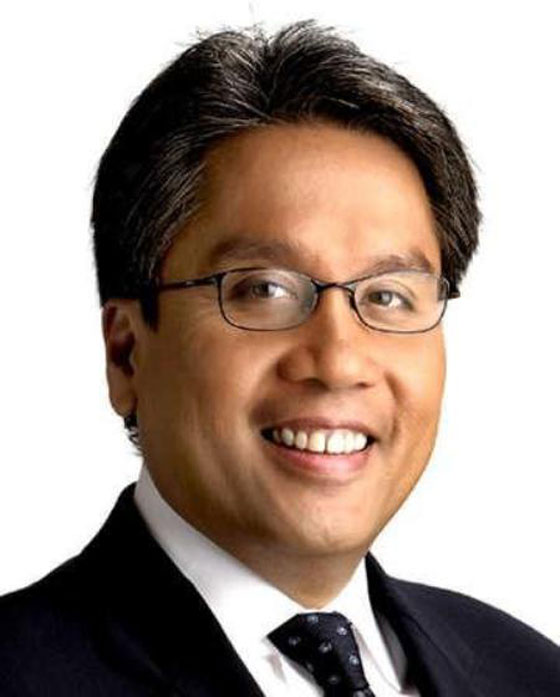

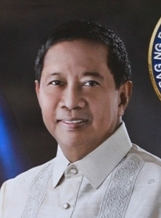
Candidate	Rodrigo Duterte	Grace Poe
Party	PDP–Laban	Independent
Alliance		PGP
Running mate	Alan Peter Cayetano	Francis Escudero
Popular vote	557,812	297,681
Percentage	41.18%	21.98%
Candidate	Mar Roxas	Jejomar Binay
Party	Liberal	UNA
Alliance	KDM
Running mate	Leni Robredo	Gregorio Honasan
Popular vote	232,427	196,228
Percentage	17.16%	14.49%
President before election
Benigno Aquino III
Liberal
Elected President
Rodrigo Duterte
PDP–Laban
- 2016 Philippine vice presidential election in Cavite
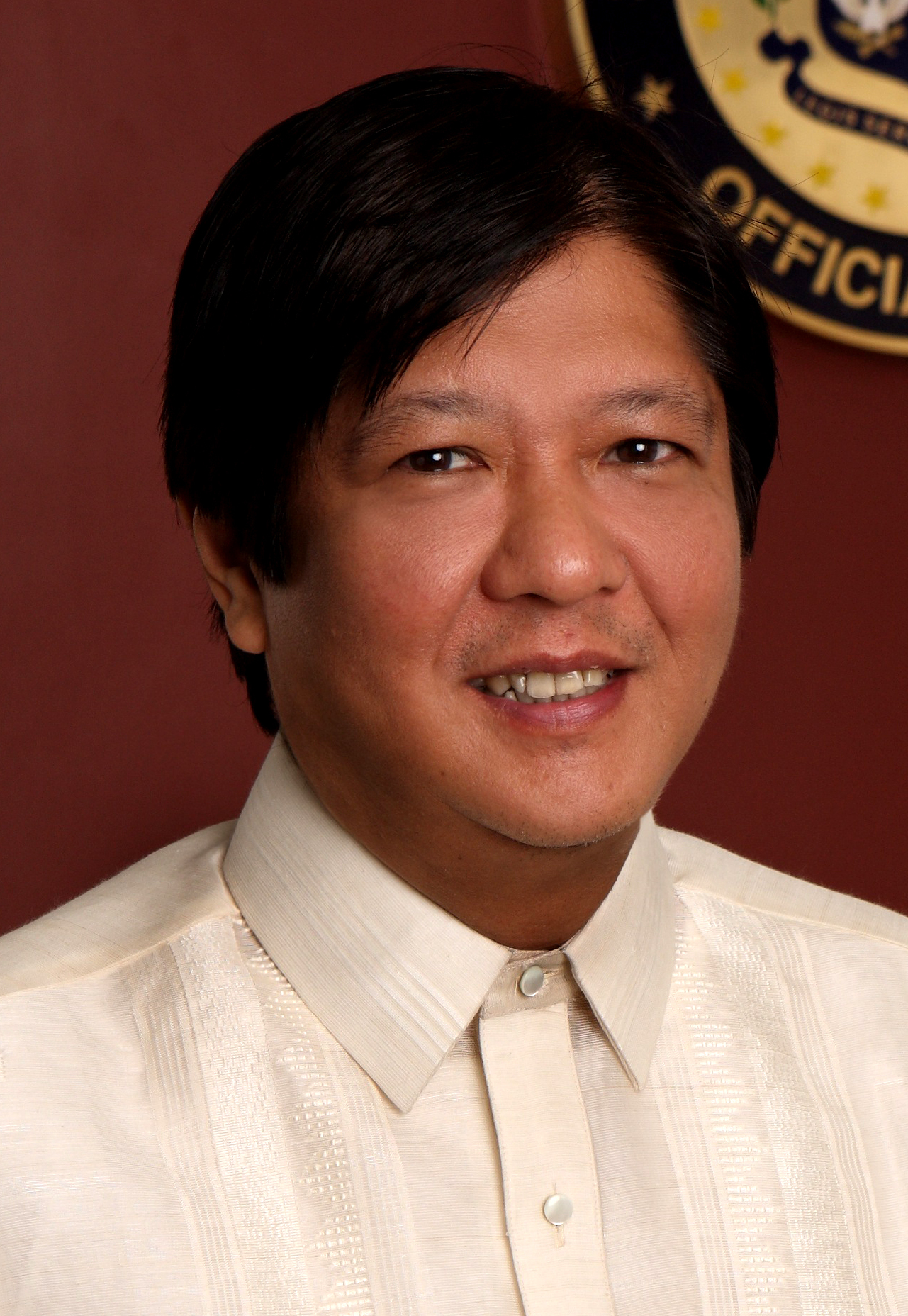

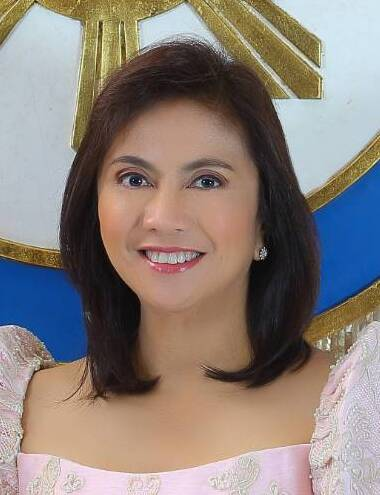

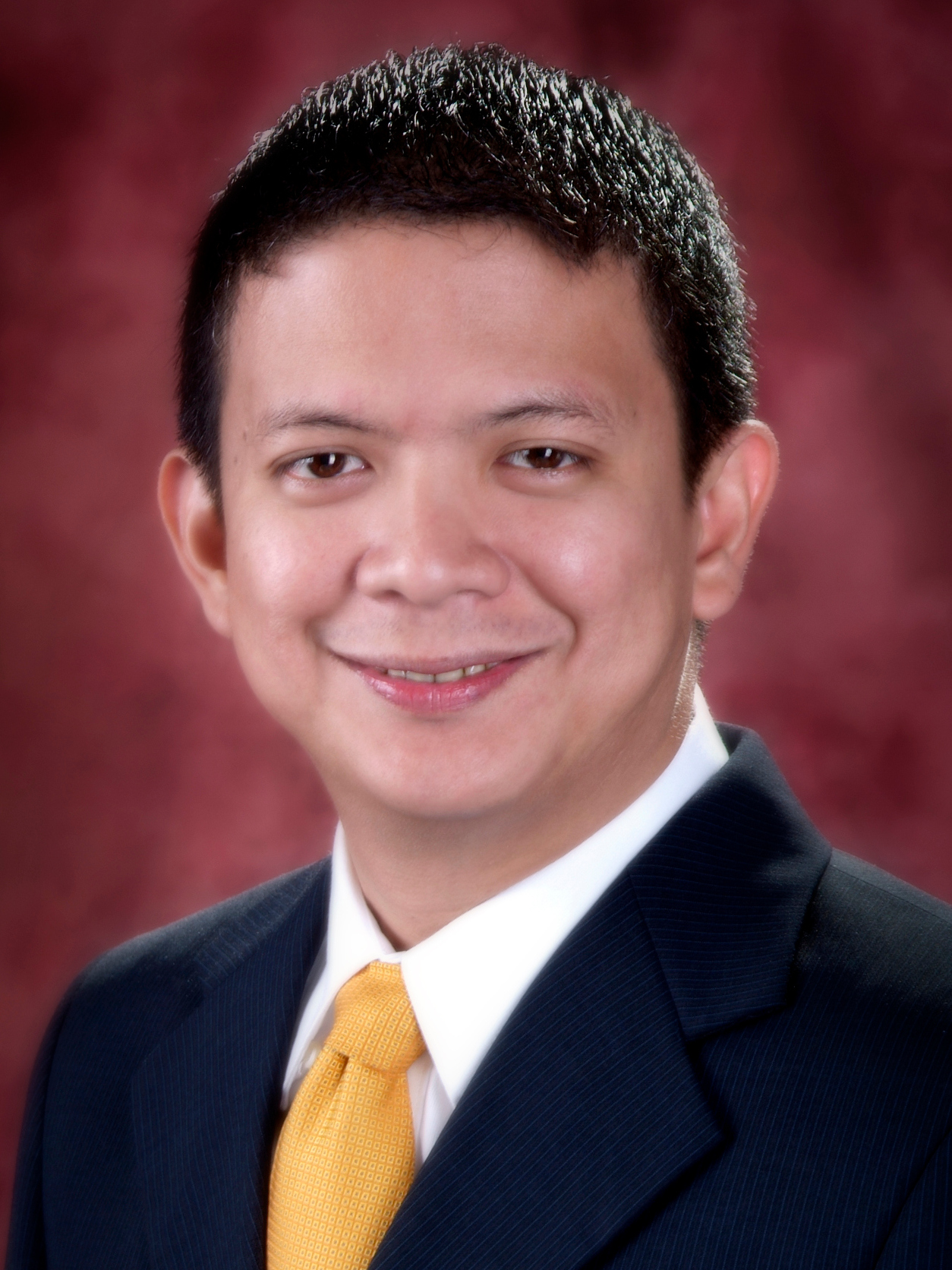

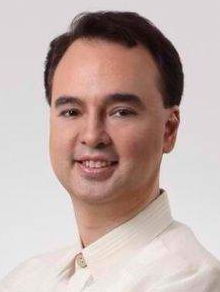
Candidate	Bongbong Marcos	Leni Robredo
Party	Independent	Liberal
Alliance		KDM
Popular vote	556,785	404,241
Percentage	41.62%	30.22%
Candidate	Francis Escudero	Alan Peter Cayetano
Party	Independent	Independent
Alliance	PGP
Popular vote	193,961	142,511
Percentage	14.50%	10.65%
Vice President before election
Jejomar Binay
UNA
Elected Vice President
Leni Robredo
Liberal

The 2016 Philippine presidential and vice presidential elections in Cavite were held on Monday, May 9, 2016, as part of the 2016 Philippine general election in which all 81 provinces, all 145 cities, and all 1,489 municipalities participated. Voters voted the president and the vice president separately.

Davao City mayor Rodrigo Duterte won the province of Cavite in a landslide and defeated Senator Grace Poe, DILG Secretary Mar Roxas, Vice president Jejomar Binay, and Senator Miriam Defensor Santiago.

Senator Bongbong Marcos won the province against Camarines Sur's representative Leni Robredo, Senators Francis Escudero, Alan Peter Cayetano, Gregorio Honasan, and Antonio Trillanes.

Cavite is the second most vole rich province during the election with 1,843,163 registered voters.

== Electoral system ==
According to the Constitution of the Philippines, the elections are held every six years after 1992, on the second Monday of May. The incumbent president is term limited and ineligible for re-election. The incumbent vice president is eligible to run for re-election and may run for two consecutive terms. The plurality voting system is used to determine the winner: the candidate with the highest number of votes, whether or not one has a majority, wins the presidency. The vice presidential election is a separate election, is held on the same rules, and voters may split their ticket. Both winners will serve six-year terms commencing on the noon of June 30, 2016, and ending on the same day six years later.

== Candidates ==
List of Presidential and Vice Presidential candidates on the ballot
Presidential candidate		Vice presidential candidate		Campaign
Candidate name and party	Position	Candidate name and party	Position	Campaign
Jejomar Binay UNA	Vice President	Gregorio Honasan UNA	Senator	(campaign)
Miriam Defensor Santiago PRP	Senator	Bongbong Marcos Independent (Note: Cayetano, Marcos and Trillanes are all members of the Nacionalista Party, but failed to get that party's nomination; instead, all of them ran as independents.)	Senator	(campaign)
Rodrigo Duterte PDP–Laban	Mayor of Davao City	Alan Peter Cayetano Independent	Senator	(campaign)
Grace Poe Independent	Senator	Francis Escudero Independent	Senator	(campaign)
Mar Roxas Liberal	Former secretary of the Interior and Local Government	Leni Robredo Liberal	House representative from Camarines Sur's 3rd district	(campaign)
None		Antonio Trillanes Independent	Senator	

== Results ==
A total of 1,390,349 voters came out to vote out of the 1,843,163 registered voters in the province.

=== Presidential result ===
2016 Philippine presidential election in Cavite (Note: The 538 votes for Roy Señeres are not listed here as they are deemed Invalid.)
Party	Candidate	Votes	%
PDP–Laban	Rodrigo Duterte	557,812	41.18%
Independent	Grace Poe	297,681	21.98%
Liberal	Mar Roxas	232,427	17.16%
UNA	Jejomar Binay	196,228	14.49%
PRP	Miriam Defensor Santiago	70,325	5.19
Total votes		1,354,473	100.00%

=== Vice presidential result ===
2016 Philippine vice presidential election in Cavite
Party	Candidate	Votes	%
Independent	Bongbong Marcos	556,785	41.62%
Liberal	Leni Robredo	404,241	30.22%
Independent	Francis Escudero	193,961	14.50%
Independent	Alan Peter Cayetano	142,511	10.65%
UNA	Gregorio Honasan	22,428	1.68%
Independent	Antonio Trillanes	17,793	1.33%
Total votes		1,337,719	100.00%
