= 2016 Philippine presidential election in Manila =

- May 9, 2016
- Registered: 974,479
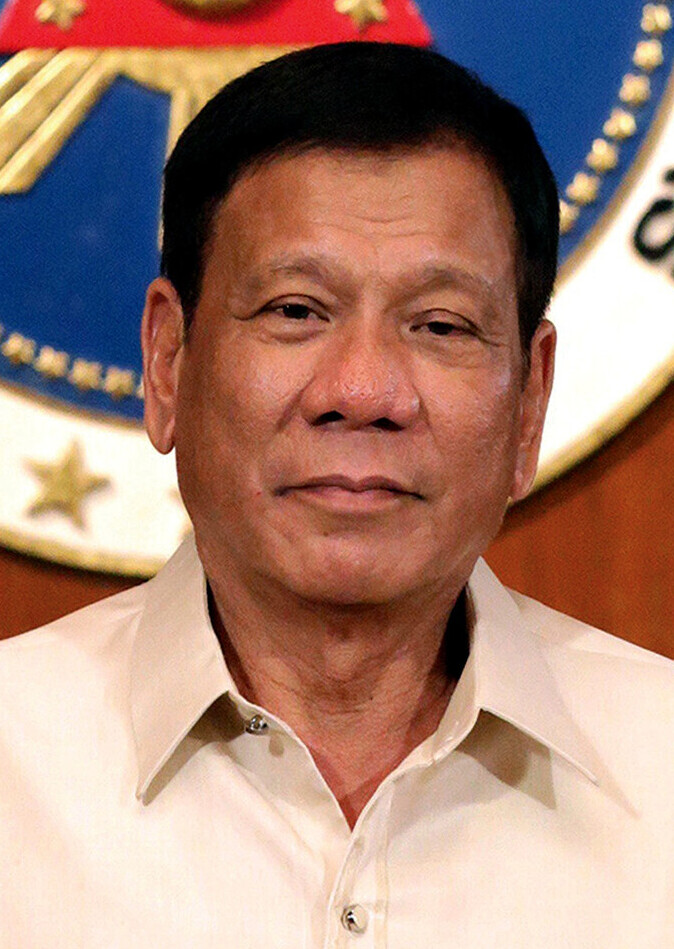

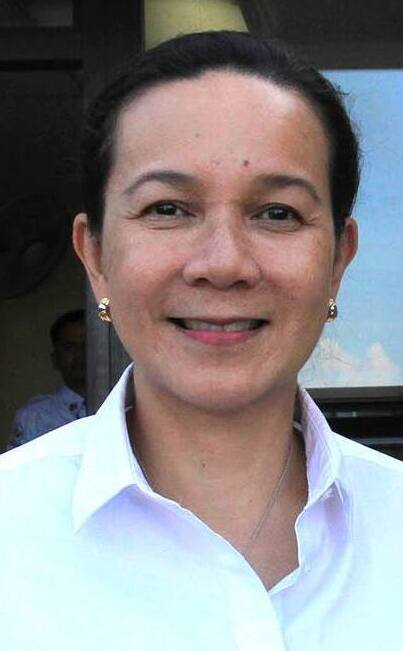

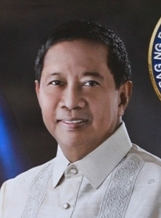

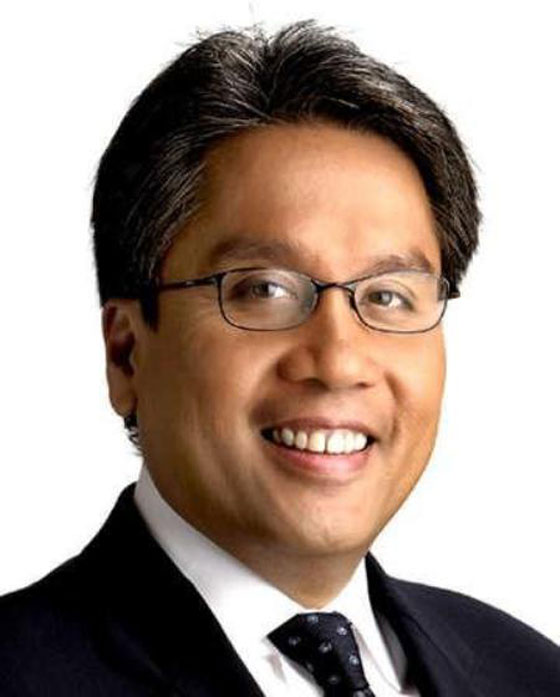
Candidate	Rodrigo Duterte	Grace Poe
Party	PDP–Laban	Independent
Alliance		PGP
Running mate	Alan Peter Cayetano	Francis Escudero
Popular vote	325,050	180,170
Percentage	43.41%	24.06%
Candidate	Jejomar Binay	Mar Roxas
Party	UNA	Liberal
Alliance		KDM
Running mate	Gregorio Honasan	Leni Robredo
Popular vote	96,997	88,047
Percentage	12.95%	11.76%
President before election
Benigno Aquino III
Liberal
Elected President
Rodrigo Duterte
PDP–Laban
- 2016 Philippine vice presidential election in Manila
- May 9, 2016
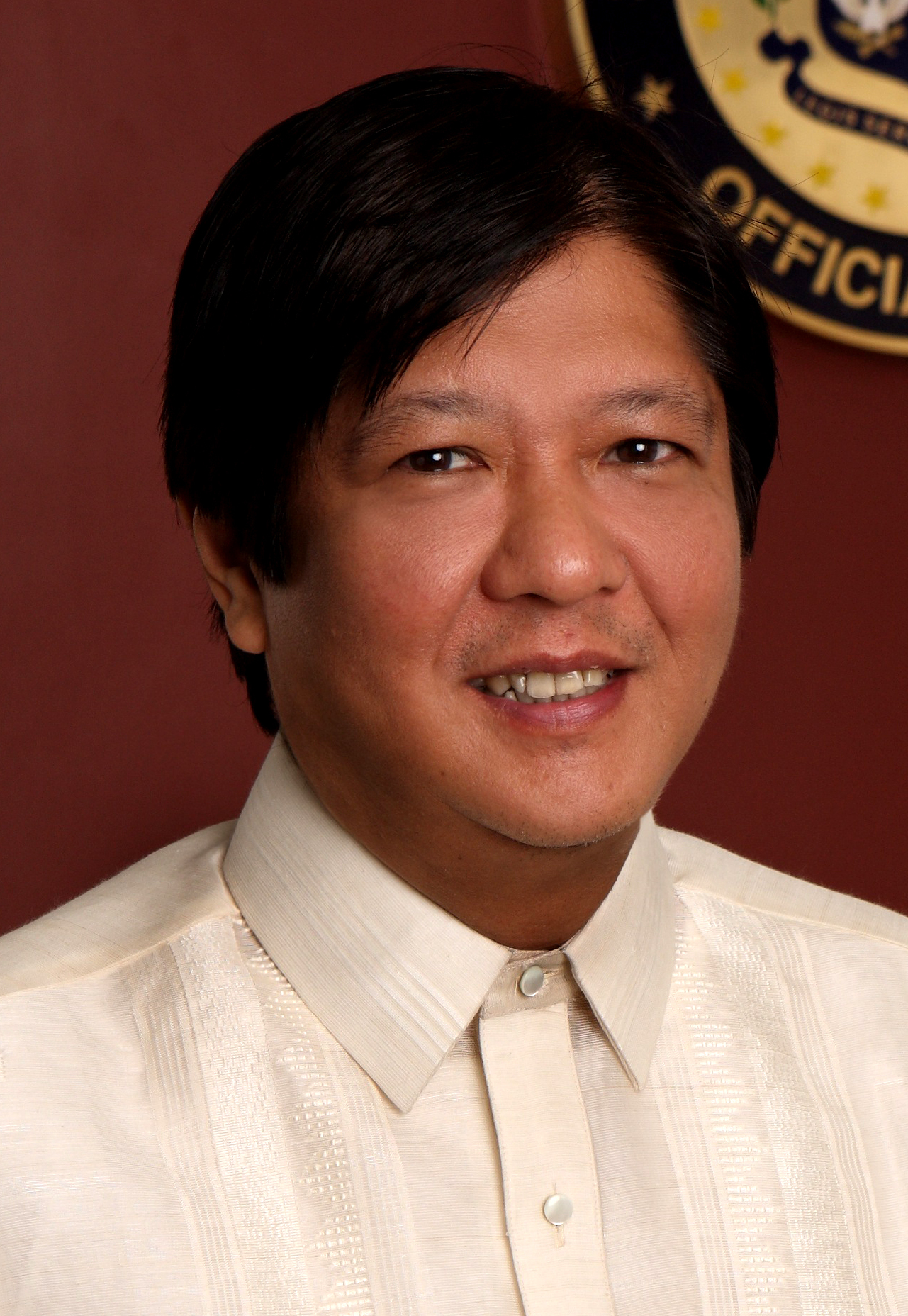

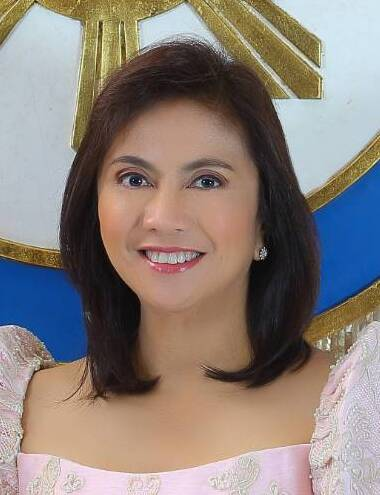

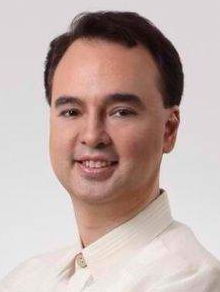
Candidate	Bongbong Marcos	Leni Robredo	Alan Peter Cayetano
Party	Independent	Liberal	Independent
Alliance		KDM
Popular vote	394,192	183,346	75,295
Percentage	53.03%	24.67%	10.13%
Vice President before election
Jejomar Binay
UNA
Elected Vice President
Leni Robredo
Liberal

The 2016 Philippine presidential and vice presidential elections in Manila were held on Monday, May 9, 2016, as part of the 2016 Philippine general election in which all 81 provinces, all 145 cities, and all 1,489 municipalities participated. Voters voted the president and the vice president separately.

Davao City mayor Rodrigo Duterte won the capital of the Philippines, Manila by a wide margin in the presidential race defeating senator Grace Poe, Vice president Jejomar Binay, DILG Secretary Mar Roxas, and senator Miriam Defensor Santiago.

Senator Bongbong Marcos won by a bigger margin in Manila defeating Camarines Sur's 3rd district house representative Leni Robredo, fellow senators Alan Peter Cayetano, Francis Escudero, Antonio Trillanes, and Gregorio Honasan.

== Electoral system ==
According to the Constitution of the Philippines, the elections are held every six years after 1992, on the second Monday of May. The incumbent president is term limited and ineligible for re-election. The incumbent vice president is eligible to run for re-election and may run for two consecutive terms. The plurality voting system is used to determine the winner: the candidate with the highest number of votes, whether or not one has a majority, wins the presidency. The vice presidential election is a separate election, is held on the same rules, and voters may split their ticket. Both winners will serve six-year terms commencing on the noon of June 30, 2016, and ending on the same day six years later.

== Candidates ==
List of Presidential and Vice Presidential candidates on the ballot
Presidential candidate		Vice presidential candidate		Campaign
Candidate name and party	Position	Candidate name and party	Position	Campaign
Jejomar Binay; UNA	Vice President	Gregorio Honasan; UNA	Senator	(campaign)
Miriam Defensor Santiago; PRP	Senator	Bongbong Marcos; Independent (Note: Cayetano, Marcos and Trillanes are all members of the Nacionalista Party, but failed to get that party's nomination; instead, all of them ran as independents.)	Senator	(campaign)
Rodrigo Duterte; PDP–Laban	Mayor of Davao City	Alan Peter Cayetano; Independent	Senator	(campaign)
Grace Poe; Independent	Senator	Francis Escudero; Independent	Senator	(campaign)
Mar Roxas; Liberal	Former secretary of the Interior and Local Government	Leni Robredo; Liberal	House representative from Camarines Sur's 3rd district	(campaign)
None		Antonio Trillanes; Independent	Senator	

== Results ==
=== Presidential result ===
2016 Philippine presidential election in Manila (Note: The 366 votes for Roy Señeres are not listed here as they are deemed Invalid.)
Party	Candidate	Votes	%
PDP–Laban	Rodrigo Duterte	325,050	43.41%
Independent	Grace Poe	180,170	24.06%
UNA	Jejomar Binay	96,997	12.95%
Liberal	Mar Roxas	88,047	11.76%
PRP	Miriam Defensor Santiago	58,535	7.82%
Total votes		748,799	100.00%

=== Vice presidential result ===
2016 Philippine vice presidential election in Manila
Party	Candidate	Votes	%
Independent	Bongbong Marcos	394,192	53.03%
Liberal	Leni Robredo	183,346	24.67%
Independent	Alan Peter Cayetano	75,295	10.13%
Independent	Francis Escudero	74,112	9.97%
Independent	Antonio Trillanes	8,989	1.21%
UNA	Gregorio Honasan	7,398	1.00%
Total votes		743,332	100.00%
