= 2016 Philippine presidential election in Sorsogon =

- May 9, 2016
- Registered: 425,025
- Turnout: 85.64%
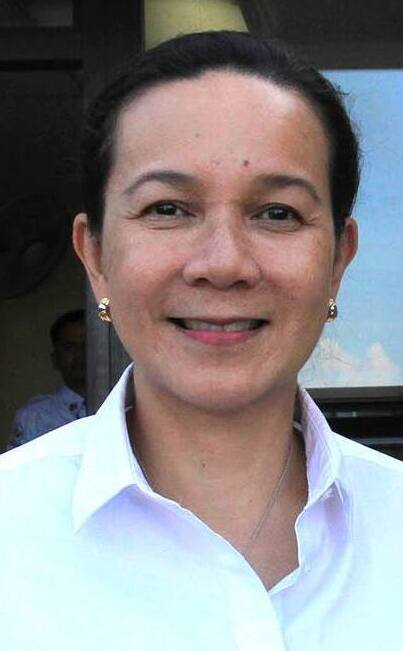

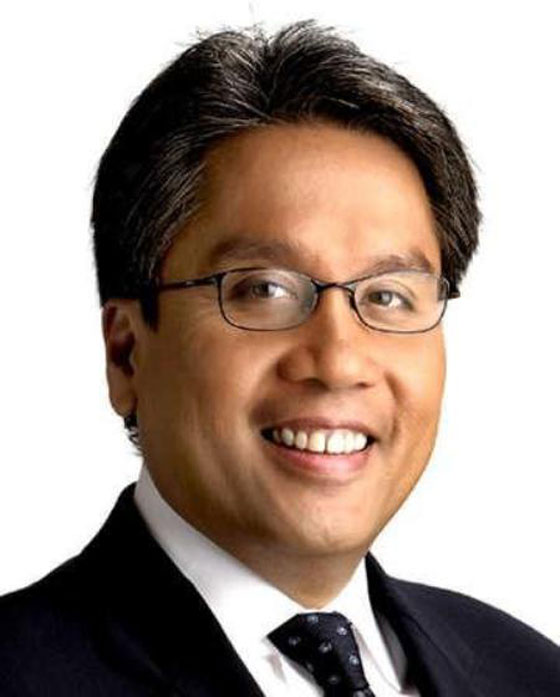

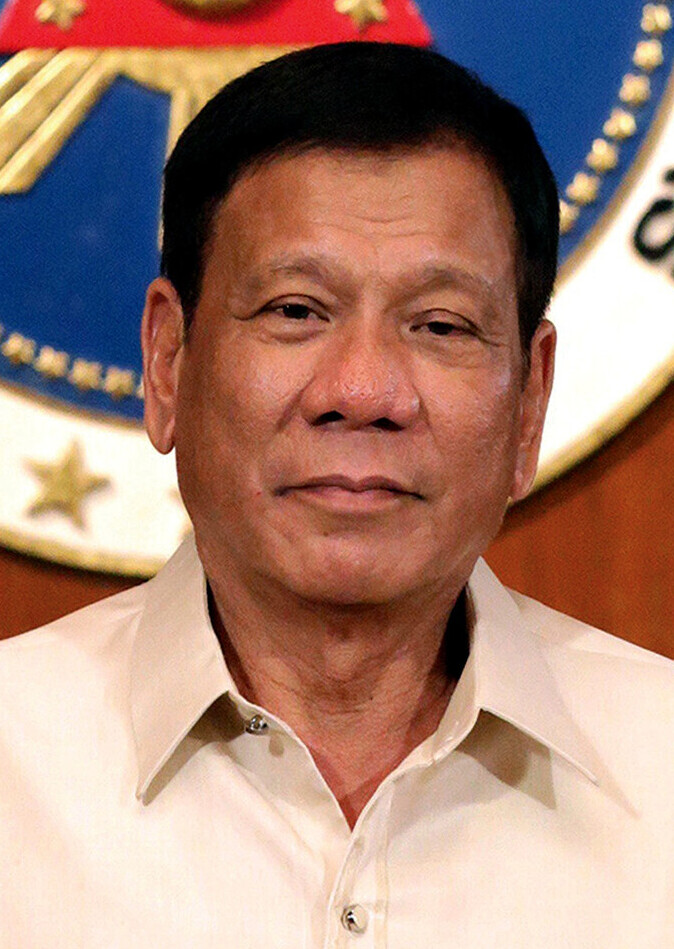

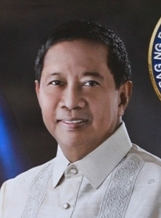
Candidate	Grace Poe	Mar Roxas
Party	Independent	Liberal
Alliance	PGP	KDM
Running mate	Francis Escudero	Leni Robredo
Popular vote	143,420	108,068
Percentage	41.64%	31.38%
Candidate	Rodrigo Duterte	Jejomar Binay
Party	PDP–Laban	UNA
Running mate	Alan Peter Cayetano	Gregorio Honasan
Popular vote	44,560	5,716
Percentage	12.94%	1.66%
President before election
Benigno Aquino III
Liberal
Elected President
Rodrigo Duterte
PDP–Laban
- 2016 Philippine vice presidential election in Sorsogon
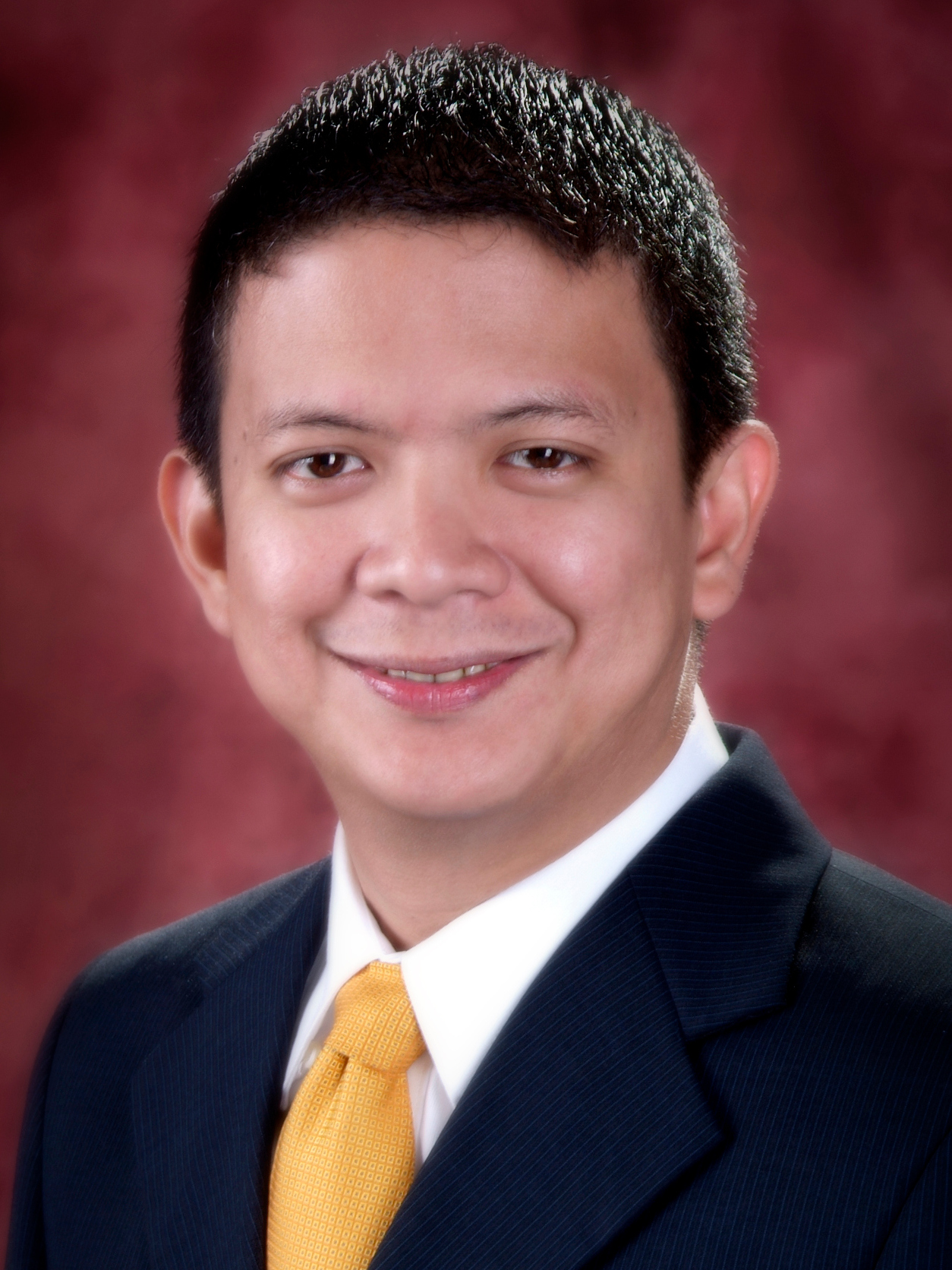

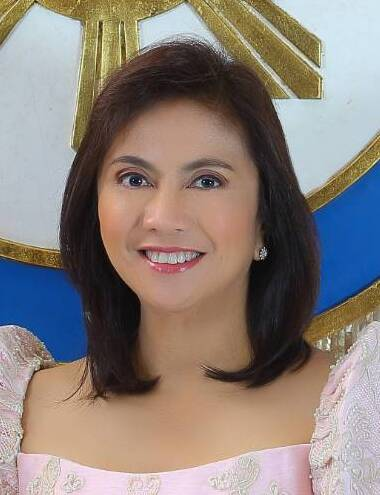
Candidate	Francis Escudero	Leni Robredo
Party	Independent	Liberal
Alliance	PGP	KDM
Popular vote	203,689	97,129
Percentage	60.43%	28.82%
Vice President before election
Jejomar Binay
UNA
Elected Vice President
Leni Robredo
Liberal

The 2016 Philippine presidential and vice presidential elections in Sorsogon were held on Monday, May 9, 2016, as part of the 2016 Philippine general election in which all 81 provinces, all 145 cities, and all 1,489 municipalities participated. Voters voted the president and the vice president separately.

Senator Grace Poe won the province of Sorsogon defeating DILG Secretary Mar Roxas, Davao City mayor Rodrigo Duterte, Vice president Jejomar Binay, and fellow senator Miriam Defensor Santiago.

Senator Francis Escudero won in a landslide in his home province and the only province he won in this election, he defeated Camarines Sur's 3rd house representative Leni Robredo, fellow senators Bongbong Marcos, Alan Peter Cayetano, Gregorio Honasan, and Antonio Trillanes.

This is the only province in this election that was won by the Partido Galing at Puso in both presidential and vice presidential races.

== Electoral system ==
According to the Constitution of the Philippines, the elections are held every six years after 1992, on the second Monday of May. The incumbent president is term limited and ineligible for re-election. The incumbent vice president is eligible to run for re-election and may run for two consecutive terms. The plurality voting system is used to determine the winner: the candidate with the highest number of votes, whether or not one has a majority, wins the presidency. The vice presidential election is a separate election, is held on the same rules, and voters may split their ticket. Both winners will serve six-year terms commencing on the noon of June 30, 2016, and ending on the same day six years later.

== Candidates ==
List of Presidential and Vice Presidential candidates on the ballot
Presidential candidate		Vice presidential candidate		Campaign
Candidate name and party	Position	Candidate name and party	Position	Campaign
Jejomar Binay UNA	Vice President	Gregorio Honasan UNA	Senator	(campaign)
Miriam Defensor Santiago PRP	Senator	Bongbong Marcos Independent (Note: Cayetano, Marcos and Trillanes are all members of the Nacionalista Party, but failed to get that party's nomination; instead, all of them ran as independents.)	Senator	(campaign)
Rodrigo Duterte PDP–Laban	Mayor of Davao City	Alan Peter Cayetano Independent	Senator	(campaign)
Grace Poe Independent	Senator	Francis Escudero Independent	Senator	(campaign)
Mar Roxas Liberal	Former secretary of the Interior and Local Government	Leni Robredo Liberal	House representative from Camarines Sur's 3rd district	(campaign)
None		Antonio Trillanes Independent	Senator	

== Results ==
A total of 363,980 voters came out to vote out of the 425,025 registered voters in the province.

=== Presidential result ===
2016 Philippine presidential election in Sorsogon (Note: The 373 votes for Roy Señeres are not listed here as they are deemed Invalid.)
Party	Candidate	Votes	%
Independent	Grace Poe	143,420	41.64%
Liberal	Mar Roxas	108,068	31.38%
PDP–Laban	Rodrigo Duterte	44,560	12.94%
UNA	Jejomar Binay	42,636	12.38%
PRP	Miriam Defensor Santiago	5,716	1.66%
Total votes		344,400	100.00%

=== Vice presidential result ===
2016 Philippine vice presidential election in Sorsogon
Party	Candidate	Votes	%
Independent	Francis Escudero	203,689	60.43%
Liberal	Leni Robredo	97,129	28.82%
Independent	Bongbong Marcos	20,709	6.14
Independent	Alan Peter Cayetano	6,909	2.05%
UNA	Gregorio Honasan	5,115	1.52%
Independent	Antonio Trillanes	3,514	1.04%
Total votes		337,065	100.00%
