= 2016 Philippine presidential election in Davao del Sur =

- May 9, 2016
- Registered: 373,692
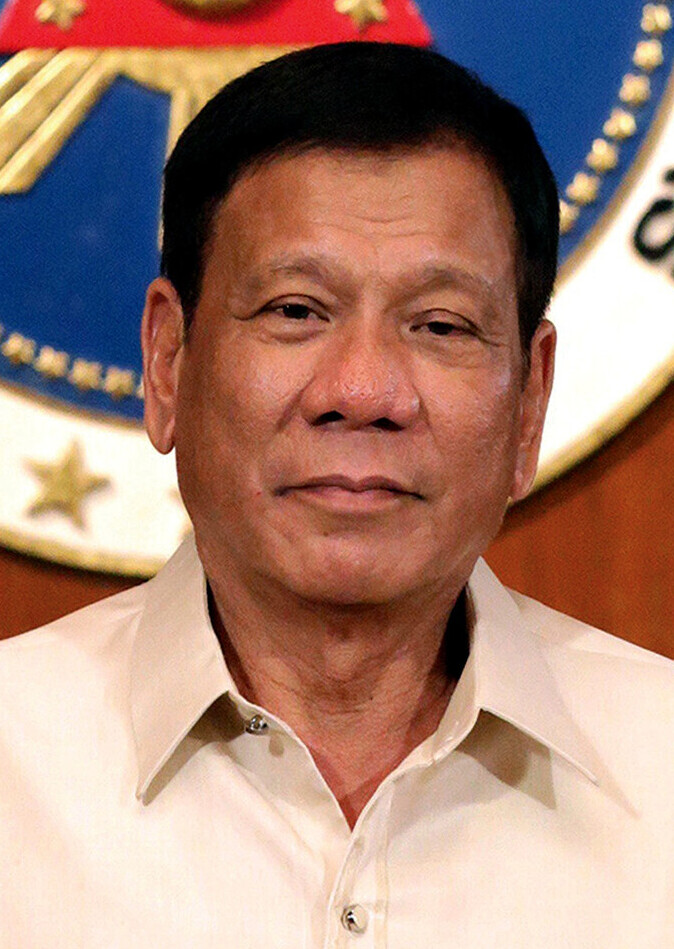

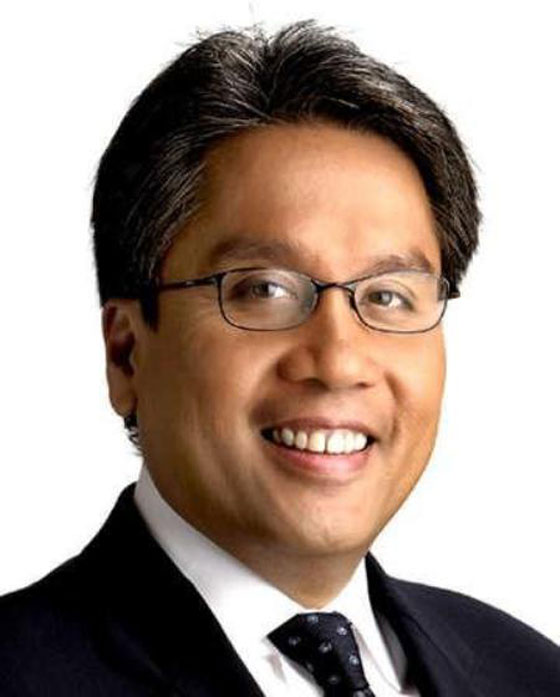
Candidate	Rodrigo Duterte	Mar Roxas
Party	PDP–Laban	Liberal
Alliance		KDM
Running mate	Alan Peter Cayetano	Leni Robredo
Popular vote	269,660	12,714
Percentage	91.60%	4.32%
President before election
Benigno Aquino III
Liberal
Elected President
Rodrigo Duterte
PDP–Laban
- 2016 Philippine vice presidential election in Davao del Sur
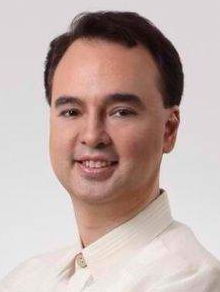

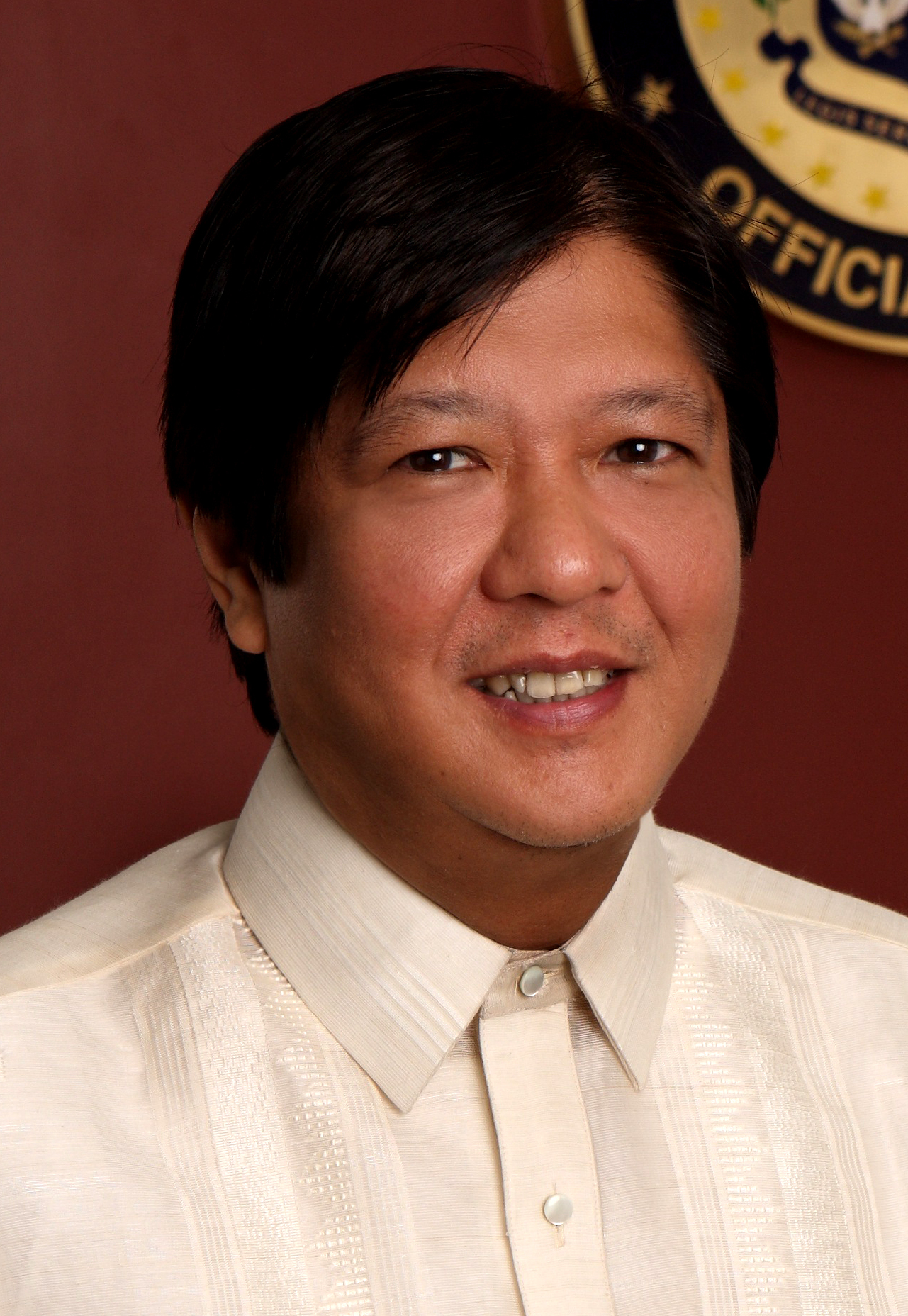

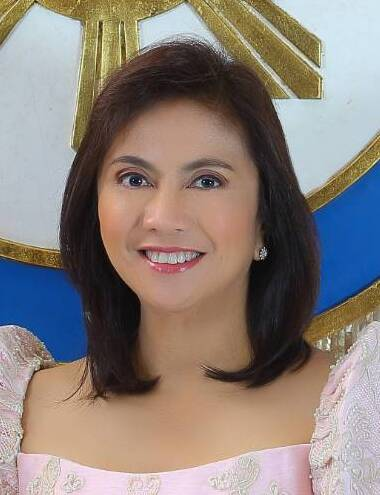
Candidate	Alan Peter Cayetano	Bongbong Marcos	Leni Robredo
Party	Independent	Independent	Liberal
Alliance			KDM
popular vote	150,910	80,303	29,288
Percentage	53.81%	28.63%	10.44%
Vice President before election
Jejomar Binay
UNA
Elected Vice President
Leni Robredo
Liberal

The 2016 Philippine presidential and vice presidential elections in Davao del Sur were held on Monday, May 9, 2016, as part of the 2016 Philippine general election in which all 81 provinces, all 145 cities, and all 1,489 municipalities participated. Voters voted the president and the vice president separately.

Davao City mayor Rodrigo Duterte won in Davao del Sur in a huge landslide. Duterte defeated DILG Secretary Mar Roxas, Senator Grace Poe, Vice president Jejomar Binay, and Senator Miriam Defensor Santiago in the presidential race by a huge margin.

Senator Alan Peter Cayetano also won Davao del Sur in the vice presidential race and defeated fellow senator Bongbong Marcos, Camarines Sur representative Leni Robredo, fellow senators Francis Escudero, Gregorio Honasan, and Antonio Trillanes.

== Electoral system ==
According to the Constitution of the Philippines, the elections are held every six years after 1992, on the second Monday of May. The incumbent president is term limited and ineligible for re-election. The incumbent vice president is eligible to run for re-election and may run for two consecutive terms. The plurality voting system is used to determine the winner: the candidate with the highest number of votes, whether or not one has a majority, wins the presidency. The vice presidential election is a separate election, is held on the same rules, and voters may split their ticket. Both winners will serve six-year terms commencing on the noon of June 30, 2016, and ending on the same day six years later.

== Candidates ==
List of Presidential and Vice Presidential candidates on the ballot
Presidential candidate		Vice presidential candidate		Campaign
Candidate name and party	Position	Candidate name and party	Position	Campaign
Jejomar Binay UNA	Vice President	Gregorio Honasan UNA	Senator	(campaign)
Miriam Defensor Santiago PRP	Senator	Bongbong Marcos Independent (Note: Cayetano, Marcos and Trillanes are all members of the Nacionalista Party, but failed to get that party's nomination; instead, all of them ran as independents.)	Senator	(campaign)
Rodrigo Duterte PDP–Laban	Mayor of Davao City	Alan Peter Cayetano Independent	Senator	(campaign)
Grace Poe Independent	Senator	Francis Escudero Independent	Senator	(campaign)
Mar Roxas Liberal	Former secretary of the Interior and Local Government	Leni Robredo Liberal	House representative from Camarines Sur's 3rd district	(campaign)
None		Antonio Trillanes Independent	Senator	

== Results ==
=== Presidential result ===
2016 Philippine presidential election in Davao del Sur (Note: The 74 votes for Roy Señeres are not listed here as they are deemed Invalid.)
Party	Candidate	Votes	%
PDP–Laban	Rodrigo Duterte	269,660	91.60%
Liberal	Mar Roxas	12,714	4.32%
Independent	Grace Poe	8,264	2.81%
UNA	Jejomar Binay	3,013	1.02%
PRP	Miriam Defensor Santiago	750	0.25%
Total votes		294,401	100.00%

=== Vice presidential result ===
2016 Philippine vice presidential election in Davao del Sur
Party	Candidate	Votes	%
Independent	Alan Peter Cayetano	150,910	53.81%
Independent	Bongbong Marcos	80,303	28.63%
Liberal	Leni Robredo	29,288	10.44%
Independent	Francis Escudero	13,551	4.83%
UNA	Gregorio Honasan	3,518	1.25%
Independent	Antonio Trillanes	2,887	1.03%
Total votes		280,457	100.00%
