= 2016 Philippine presidential election in Davao City =

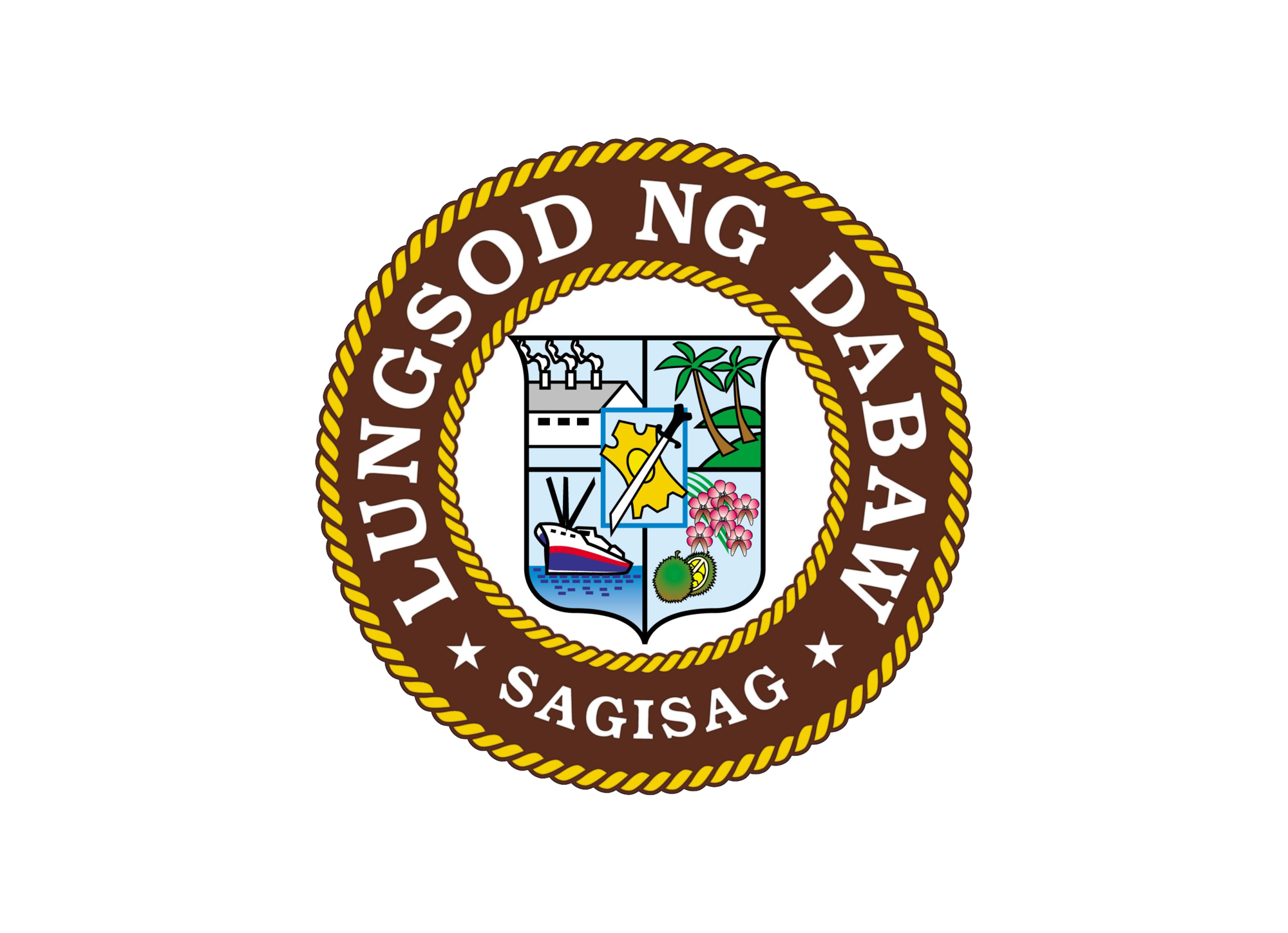
- May 9, 2016
- Registered: 873,670
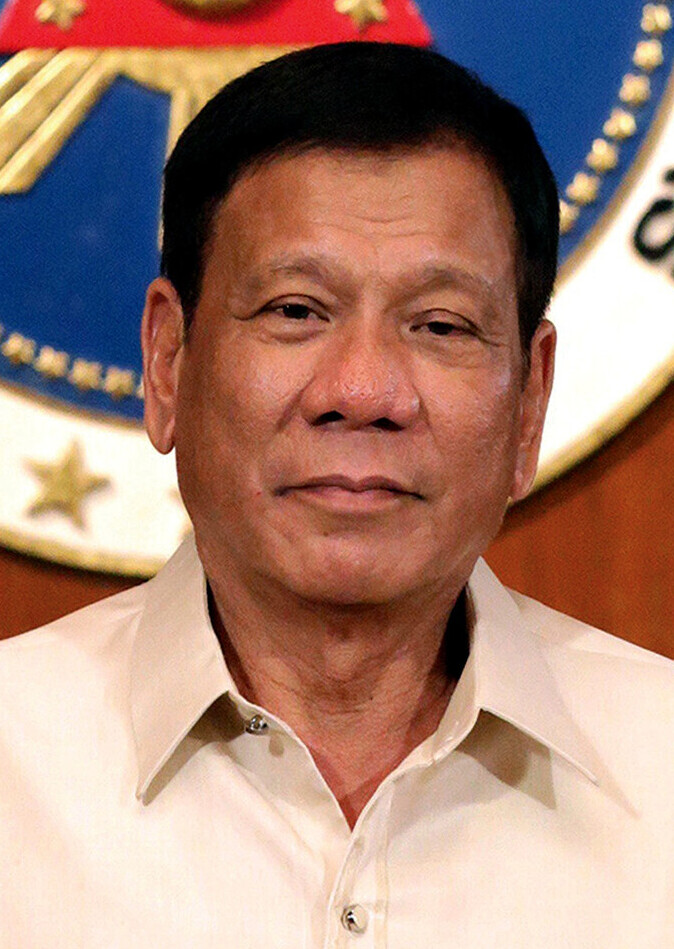

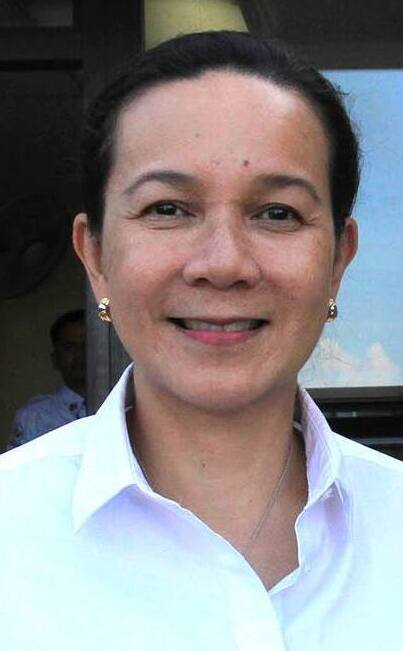
Candidate	Rodrigo Duterte	Grace Poe
Party	PDP–Laban	Independent
Alliance		PGP
Running mate	Alan Peter Cayetano	Francis Escudero
Popular vote	614,192	9,053
Percentage	96.60%	1.42%
President before election
Benigno Aquino III
Liberal
Elected President
Rodrigo Duterte
PDP–Laban
- 2016 Philippine vice presidential election in Davao City
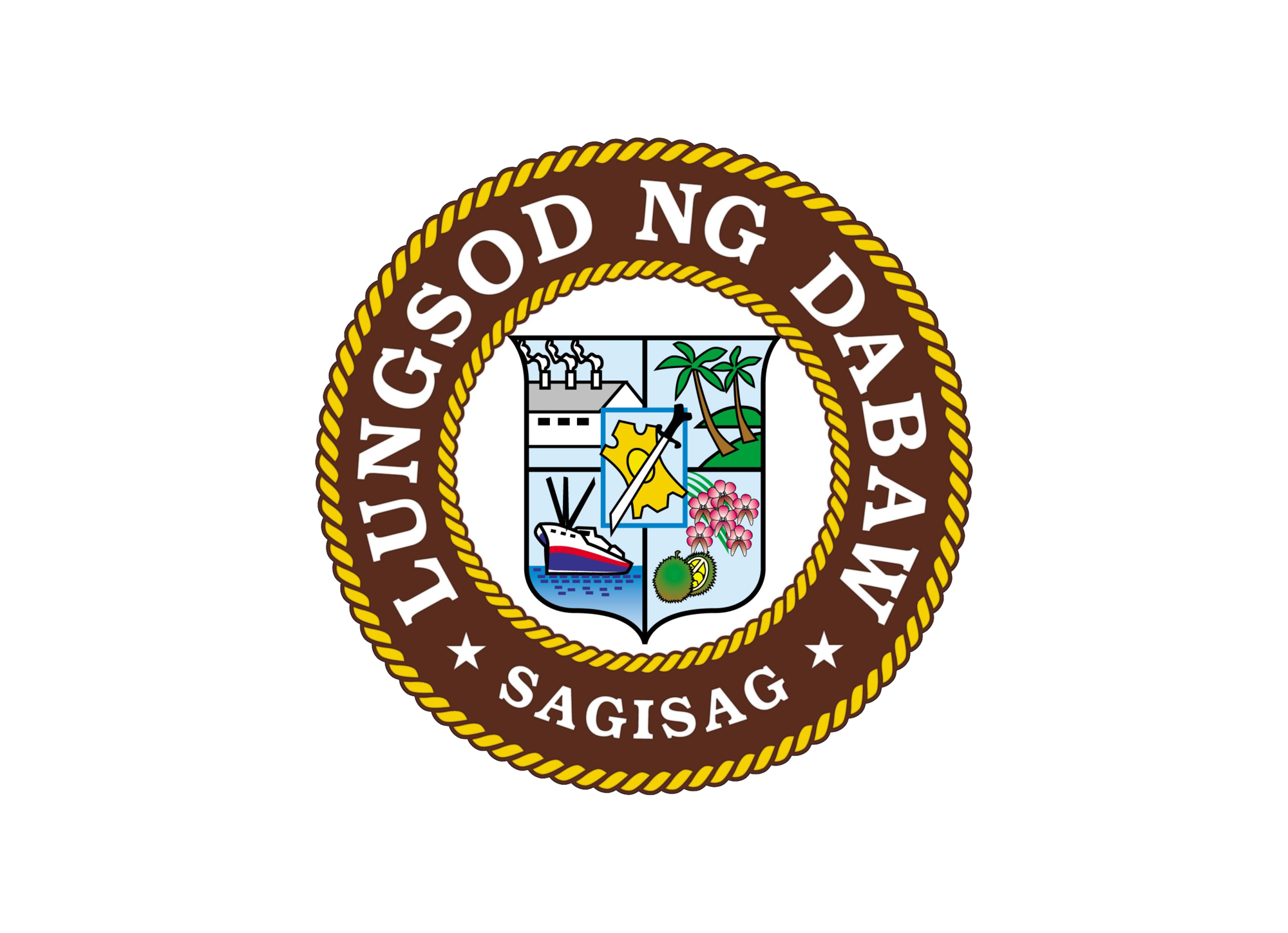

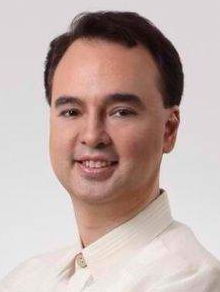

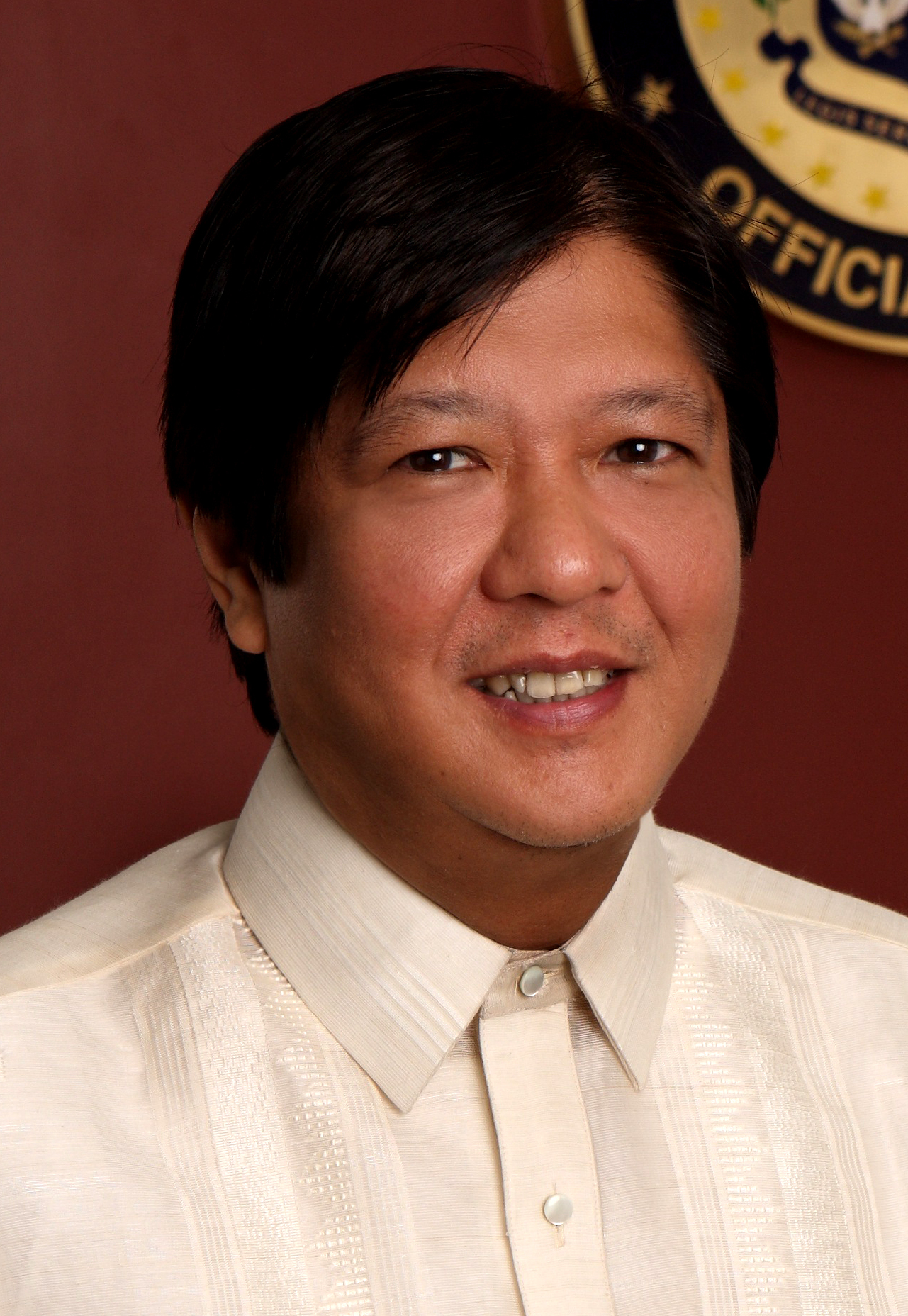
Candidate	Alan Peter Cayetano	Bongbong Marcos
Party	Independent	Independent
Popular vote	451,296	122,620
Percentage	71.93%	19.54%
Vice President before election
Jejomar Binay
UNA
Elected Vice President
Leni Robredo
Liberal

The 2016 Philippine presidential and vice presidential elections in Davao City were held on Monday, May 9, 2016, as part of the 2016 Philippine general election in which all 81 provinces, all 145 cities, and all 1,489 municipalities participated. Voters voted the president and the vice president separately.

Davao City mayor Rodrigo Duterte won in a huge landslide in his home city, being the mayor of Davao City since 2013, 2001–2010, 1991–1998, and 1988–1990. Duterte defeated senator Grace Poe, DILG Secretary Mar Roxas, Vice president Jejomar Binay, and senator Miriam Defensor Santiago.

Senator Alan Peter Cayetano also won in a huge landslide against fellow senator Bongbong Marcos, Camarines Sur's 3rd district house representative Leni Robredo, fellow senators Francis Escudero, Gregorio Honasan, and Antonio Trillanes.

== Electoral system ==
According to the Constitution of the Philippines, the elections are held every six years after 1992, on the second Monday of May. The incumbent president is term limited and ineligible for re-election. The incumbent vice president is eligible to run for re-election and may run for two consecutive terms. The plurality voting system is used to determine the winner: the candidate with the highest number of votes, whether or not one has a majority, wins the presidency. The vice presidential election is a separate election, is held on the same rules, and voters may split their ticket. Both winners will serve six-year terms commencing on the noon of June 30, 2016, and ending on the same day six years later.

== Candidates ==
List of Presidential and Vice Presidential candidates on the ballot
Presidential candidate		Vice presidential candidate		Campaign
Candidate name and party	Position	Candidate name and party	Position	Campaign
Jejomar Binay UNA	Vice President	Gregorio Honasan UNA	Senator	(campaign)
Miriam Defensor Santiago PRP	Senator	Bongbong Marcos Independent (Note: Cayetano, Marcos and Trillanes are all members of the Nacionalista Party, but failed to get that party's nomination; instead, all of them ran as independents.)	Senator	(campaign)
Rodrigo Duterte PDP–Laban	Mayor of Davao City	Alan Peter Cayetano Independent	Senator	(campaign)
Grace Poe Independent	Senator	Francis Escudero Independent	Senator	(campaign)
Mar Roxas Liberal	Former secretary of the Interior and Local Government	Leni Robredo Liberal	House representative from Camarines Sur's 3rd district	(campaign)
None		Antonio Trillanes Independent	Senator	

== Results ==
=== Presidential result ===
2016 Philippine presidential election in Davao City (Note: The 64 votes for Roy Señeres are not listed here as they are deemed Invalid.)
Party	Candidate	Votes	%
PDP–Laban	Rodrigo Duterte	614,192	96.60%
Independent	Grace Poe	9,053	1.42%
Liberal	Mar Roxas	7,546	1.19%
UNA	Jejomar Binay	3,329	0.52%
PRP	Miriam Defensor Santiago	1,671	0.26%
Total votes		635,791	100.00%

=== Vice presidential result ===
2016 Philippine vice presidential election in Davao City
Party	Candidate	Votes	%
Independent	Alan Peter Cayetano	451,296	71.93%
Independent	Bongbong Marcos	122,620	19.54%
Liberal	Leni Robredo	30,718	4.90%
Independent	Francis Escudero	17,645	2.81%
UNA	Gregorio Honasan	3,236	0.52%
Independent	Antonio Trillanes	1,879	0.30%
Total votes		627,394	100.00%
