= 2016 Philippine presidential election in Zamboanga City =

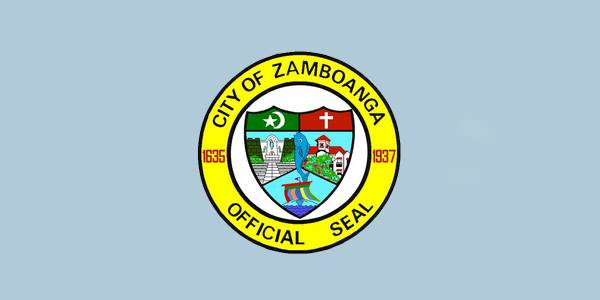
- May 9, 2016
- Registered: 412,795
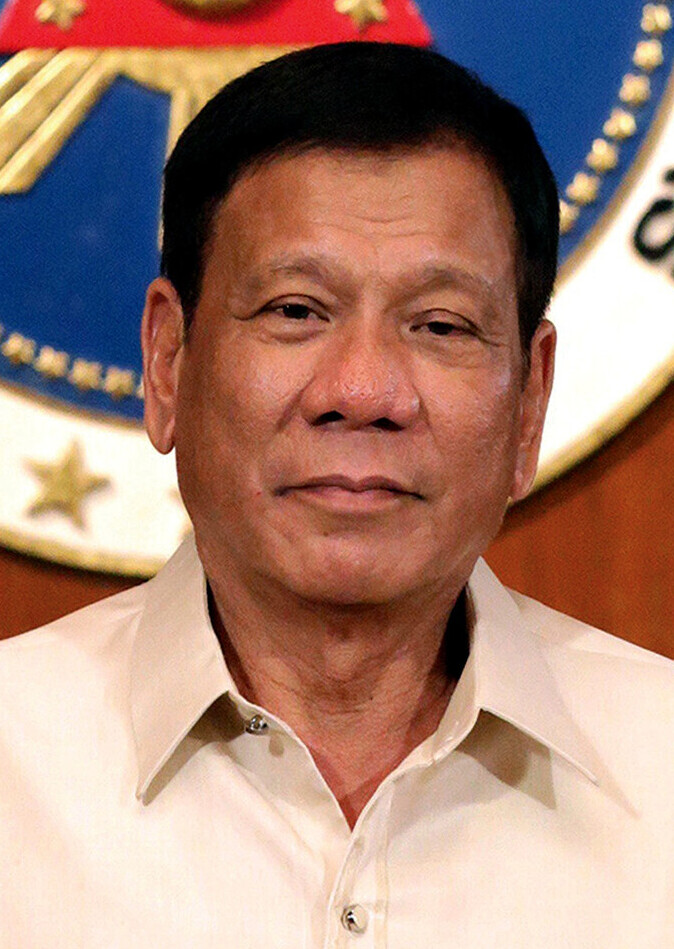

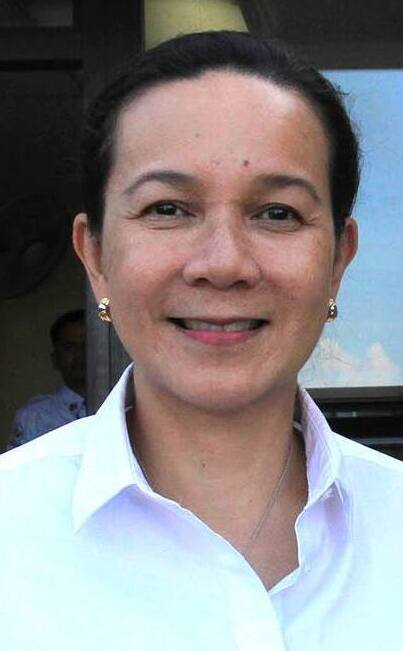

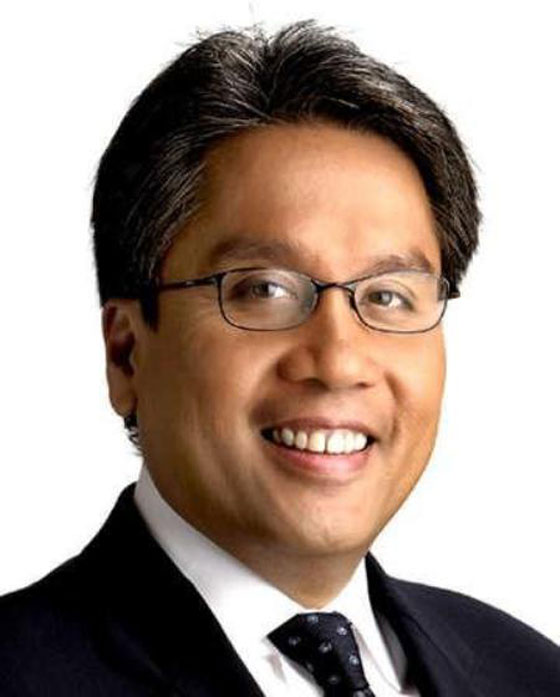
Candidate	Rodrigo Duterte	Grace Poe	Mar Roxas
Party	PDP–Laban	Independent	Liberal
Running mate	Alan Peter Cayetano	Francis Escudero	Leni Robredo
Popular vote	107,565	84,728	43,031
Percentage	40.65%	32.02%	16.26%
President before election
Benigno Aquino III
Liberal
Elected President
Rodrigo Duterte
PDP–Laban
- 2016 Philippine vice presidential election in Zamboanga City
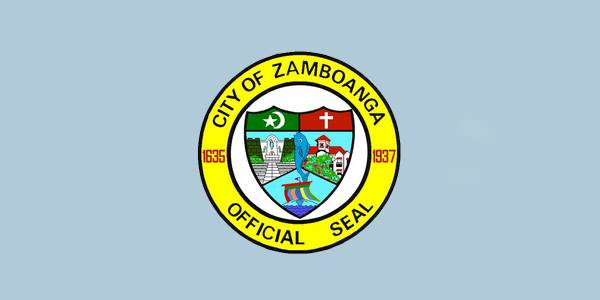

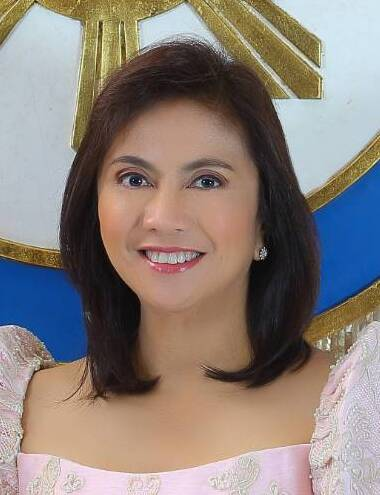

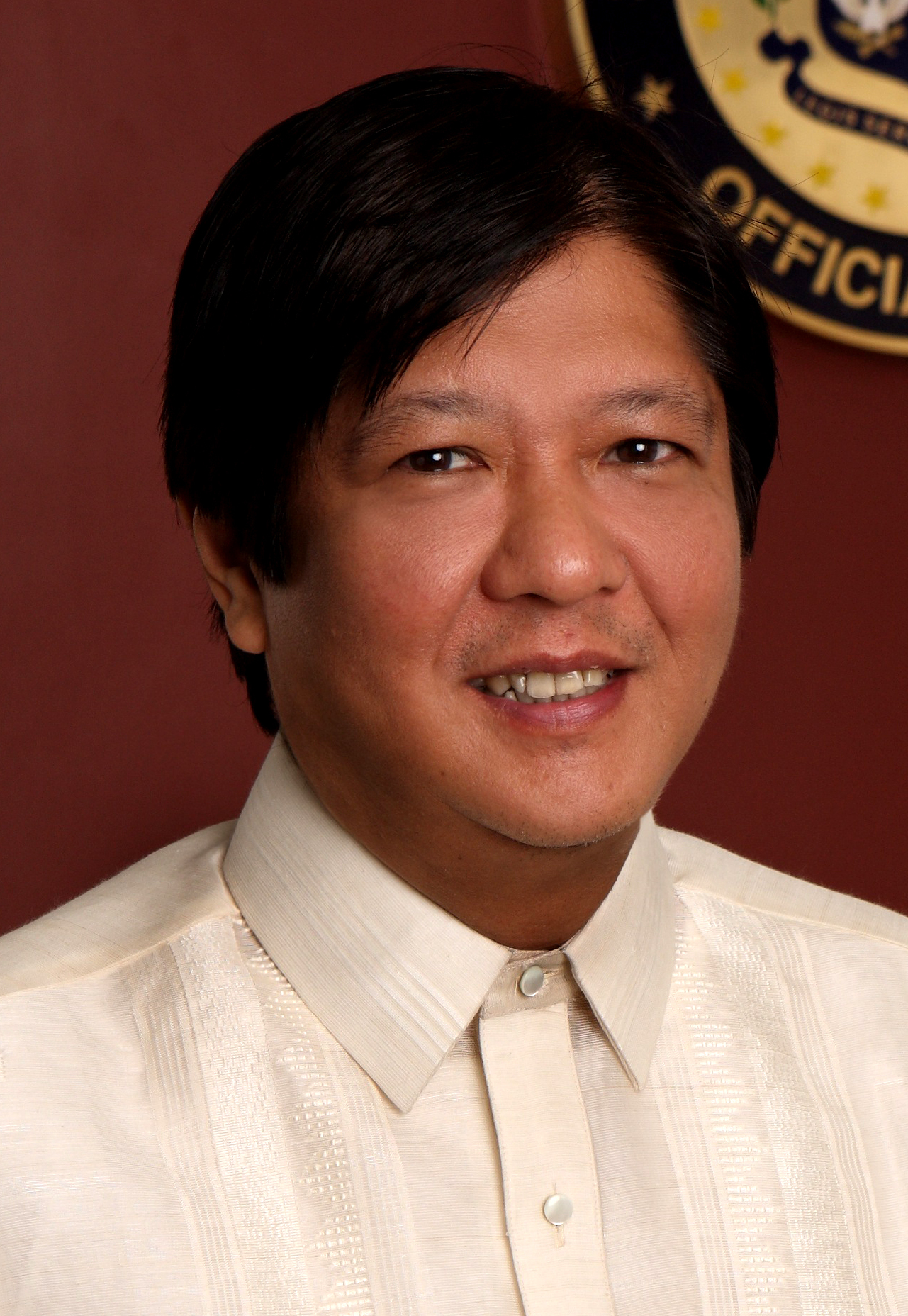

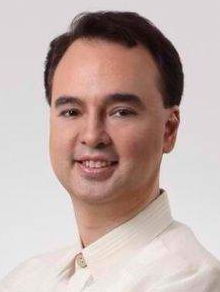

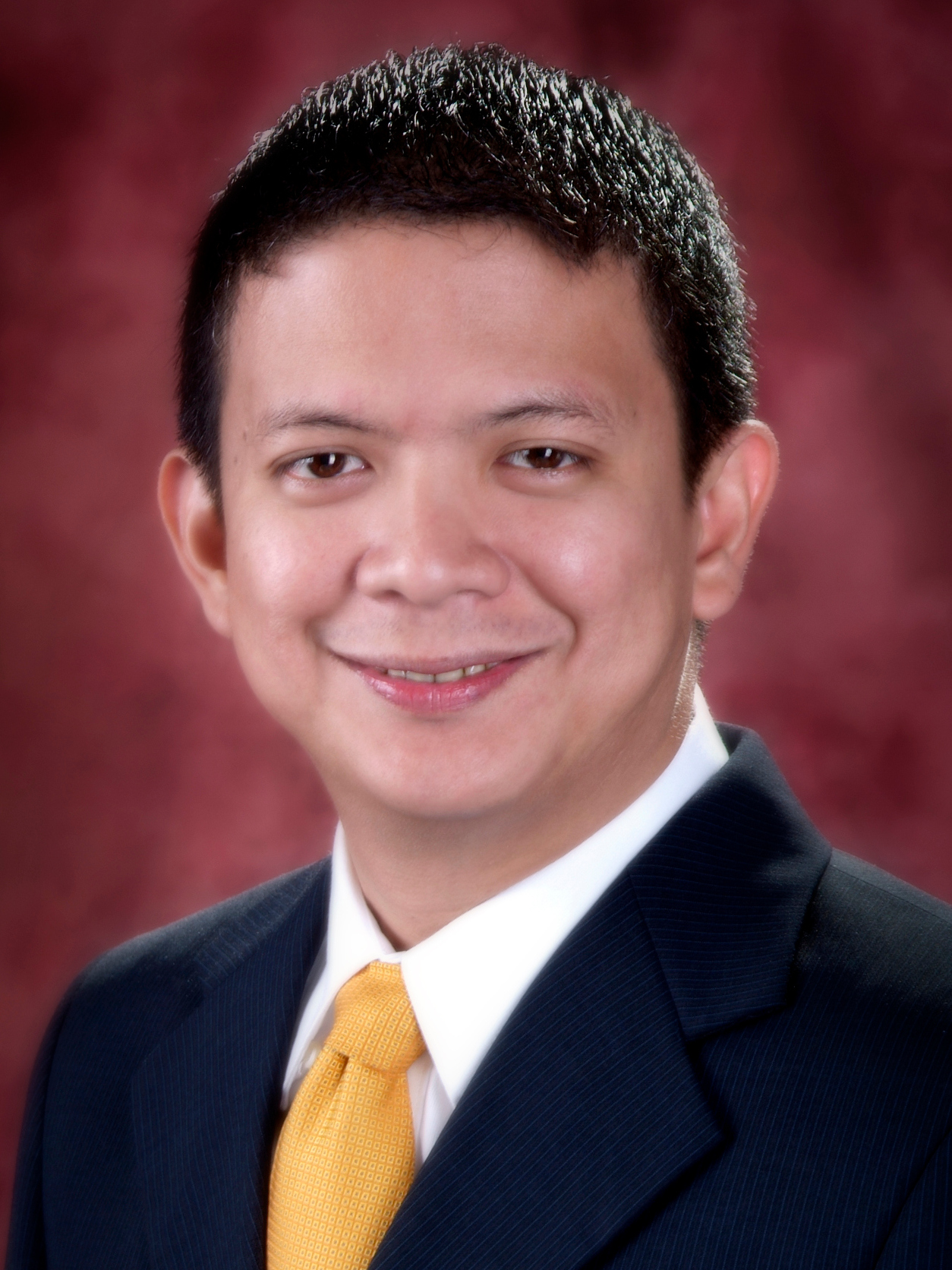
Candidate	Leni Robredo	Bongbong Marcos
Party	Liberal	Independent
Popular vote	73,730	67,522
Percentage	28.37%	25.98%
Candidate	Alan Peter Cayetano	Francis Escudero
Party	Independent	Independent
Popular vote	50,552	45,352
Percentage	19.45%	17.45%
Vice President before election
Jejomar Binay
UNA
Elected Vice President
Leni Robredo
Liberal

The 2016 Philippine presidential and vice presidential elections in Zamboanga City were held on Monday, May 9, 2016, as part of the 2016 Philippine general election in which all 81 provinces, all 145 cities, and all 1,489 municipalities participated. Voters voted the president and the vice president separately.

Davao City mayor Rodrigo Duterte won the city of Zamboanga in the presidential race defeating senator Grace Poe who won in Zamboanga del Sur, DILG Secretary Mar Roxas, Vice president Jejomar Binay, and senator Miriam Defensor Santiago.

Camarines Sur's 3rd district house representative Leni Robredo narrowly defeated senator Bongbong Marcos who won in Zamboanga del Sur. Senators Alan Peter Cayetano, Francis Escudero, Antonio Trillanes, and Gregorio Honasan.

== Electoral system ==
According to the Constitution of the Philippines, the elections are held every six years after 1992, on the second Monday of May. The incumbent president is term limited and ineligible for re-election. The incumbent vice president is eligible to run for re-election and may run for two consecutive terms. The plurality voting system is used to determine the winner: the candidate with the highest number of votes, whether or not one has a majority, wins the presidency. The vice presidential election is a separate election, is held on the same rules, and voters may split their ticket. Both winners will serve six-year terms commencing on the noon of June 30, 2016, and ending on the same day six years later.

== Candidates ==
List of Presidential and Vice Presidential candidates on the ballot
Presidential candidate		Vice presidential candidate		Campaign
Candidate name and party	Position	Candidate name and party	Position	Campaign
Jejomar Binay UNA	Vice President	Gregorio Honasan UNA	Senator	(campaign)
Miriam Defensor Santiago PRP	Senator	Bongbong Marcos Independent (Note: Cayetano, Marcos and Trillanes are all members of the Nacionalista Party, but failed to get that party's nomination; instead, all of them ran as independents.)	Senator	(campaign)
Rodrigo Duterte PDP–Laban	Mayor of Davao City	Alan Peter Cayetano Independent	Senator	(campaign)
Grace Poe Independent	Senator	Francis Escudero Independent	Senator	(campaign)
Mar Roxas Liberal	Former secretary of the Interior and Local Government	Leni Robredo Liberal	House representative from Camarines Sur's 3rd district	(campaign)
None		Antonio Trillanes Independent	Senator	

== Results ==
=== Presidential result ===
2016 Philippine presidential election in Zamboanga City (Note: The 221 votes for Roy Señeres are not listed here as they are deemed Invalid.)
Party	Candidate	Votes	%
PDP–Laban	Rodrigo Duterte	107,565	40.65%
Independent	Grace Poe	84,728	32.02%
Liberal	Mar Roxas	43,031	16.26%
UNA	Jejomar Binay	22,201	8.39%
PRP	Miriam Defensor Santiago	7,068	2.67%
Total votes		264,593	100.00%

=== Vice presidential result ===
2016 Philippine vice presidential election in Zamboanga City
Party	Candidate	Votes	%
Liberal	Leni Robredo	73,730	28.37%
Independent	Bongbong Marcos	67,522	25.98%
Independent	Alan Peter Cayetano	50,552	19.45%
Independent	Francis Escudero	45,352	17.45%
Independent	Antonio Trillanes	15,406	5.93%
UNA	Gregorio Honasan	7,365	2.83%
Total votes		259,927	100.00%
