= Koalisyon ng Daang Matuwid =

Defunct coalition supporting Mar Roxas' presidential campaign

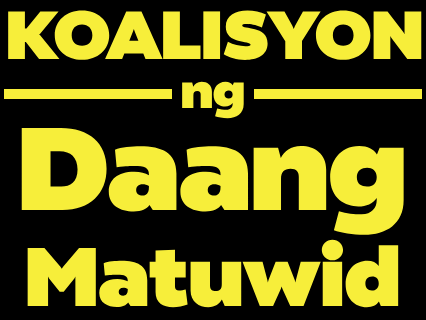
- Leader: Mar Roxas
- Senate leader: Franklin Drilon
- Founded: 2015
- Dissolved: 2016
- Preceded by: Team PNoy
- Succeeded by: Otso Diretso
- Ideology: Liberalism; Social democracy
- Political position: Centre to centre-left
- Coalition members: Liberal; Akbayan
- Colors: Yellow

The Koalisyon ng Daang Matuwid (lit. 'Coalition of the Straight Path') was the umbrella of the administration-backed presidential and senatorial line-up for the 2016 Philippine Senate election. It is composed mostly of supporters of Mar Roxas, who announced his presidential bid after the endorsement of Philippine President Benigno Aquino III during the event at the Club Filipino in July 2015. It is the remnant of Team PNoy which was formed by the Liberal Party along with Akbayan Citizens Action Party, Laban ng Demokratikong Pilipino, the Nacionalista Party, the Nationalist People's Coalition and the National Unity Partyas its coalition members.

Their defeat in the presidential elections rendered the alliance nonexistent as they became the opposition bloc in the Senate, while most of the Liberal Party members in the House of Representatives joined the government-backed Coalition for Change. It was succeeded by Otso Diretso for the 2019 Philippine Senate election with 8 candidates announced in December 2018.

== History ==
=== 2016 Elections ===
A few days after his final SONA, Pres. Aquino endorsed Sec. Mar Roxas to be their standard bearer in 2016, after Sen. Grace Poe failed to agree to be Aquino's presidential bet in 2016, and instead she preferred to be Roxas' running mate, pitting against Jejomar Binay - Gregorio Honasan tandem.

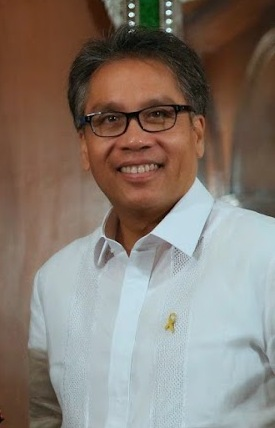
Mar Roxas

=== Vice Presidential nominee ===
After Roxas had officially announced his candidacy in October 2015, he chooses incumbent Camarines Sur 3rd District Representative Leni Robredo, widow of former DILG Secretary Jesse Robredo as his vice presidential candidate at the Club Filipino where she accepted.

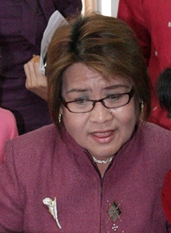
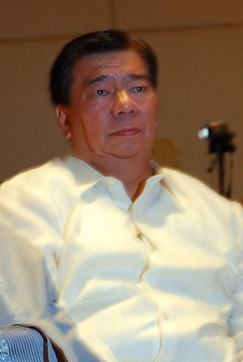
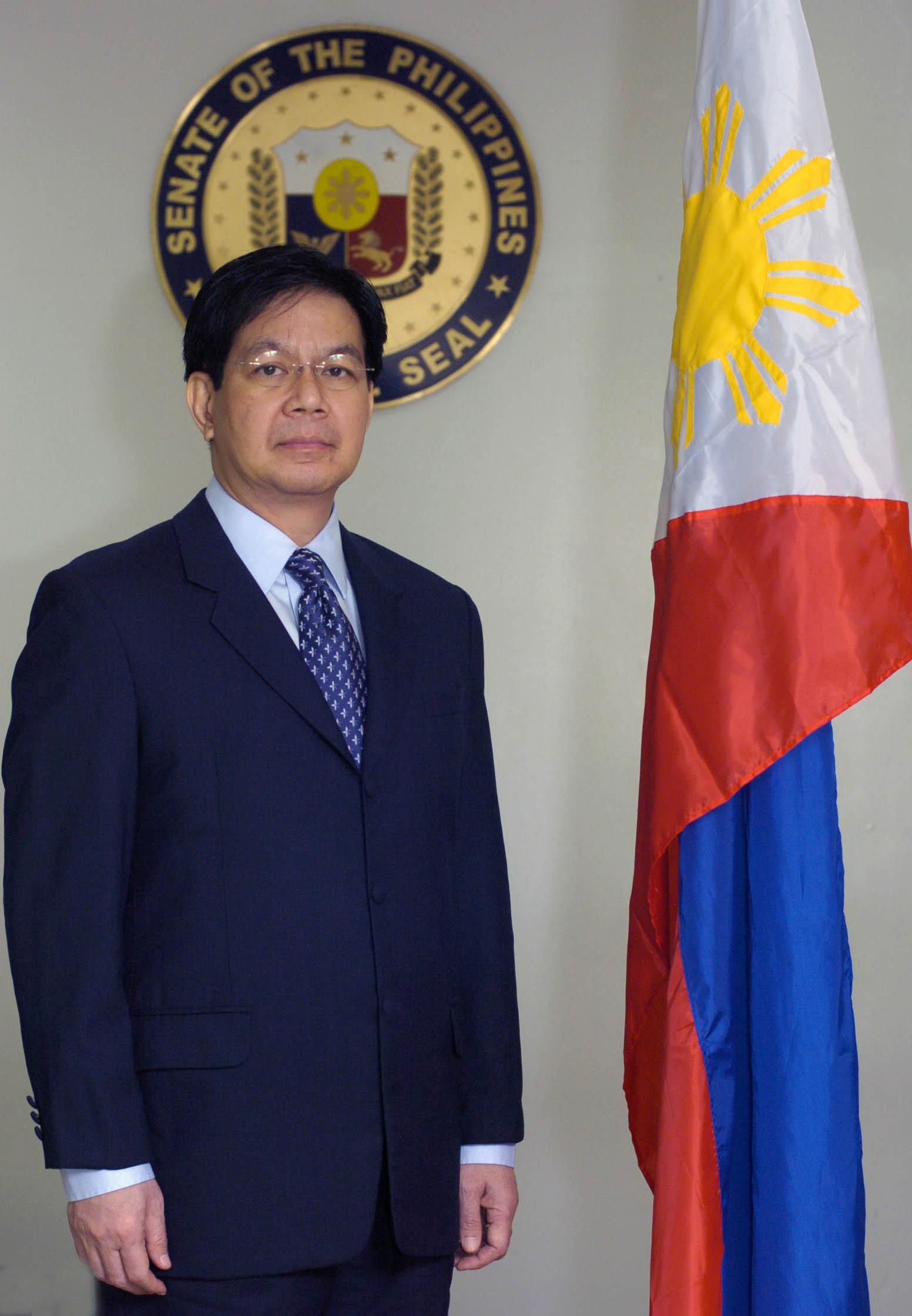
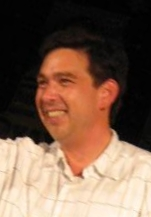
Leila de Lima, Franklin Drilon, Panfilo Lacson, & Ralph Recto

== Senatorial slate ==
Candidate	Party	Last position in government	Relatives in government	Elected
Ina Ambolodto	Liberal	DILG Assistant Secretary for Muslim Affairs and Special Concerns and former Maguindanao officer-in-charge	none	No
Leila de Lima	Liberal	former Secretary of Justice (2010–2015)	none	Yes
Franklin Drilon	Liberal	Senate President of the Philippines (2013–present, 2001–2006, 2000) Senator of the Philippines (2010–present, 1995–2007) Majority leader of the Senate of the Philippines (1998–2000) Executive Secretary (1991–1992) Secretary of Justice (1992–1995, 1990–1991) Secretary of Labor and Employment (1987–1990)	none	Yes
TG Guingona	Liberal	Senator of the Philippines (2010—present), former Member of the Philippine House of Representatives from Bukidnon's Second District (2004–2010)	Teofisto Guingona, Jr. (father) Ruth de Lara Guingona (mother) Teofisto Guingona, Sr. (grandfather)	No
Risa Hontiveros	Akbayan	board director of the Philippine Health Insurance Corporation (2015), former Member of the Philippine House of Representatives from Akbayan Partylist (2004–2010)	none	Yes
Panfilo Lacson	Independent	former Presidential Assistant for Rehabilitation and Recovery (2013–2015) former Senator of the Philippines (2001–2013), former Chief of the Philippine National Police (1999–2001)	none	Yes
Mark Lapid	Aksyon	chief operating officer of the Tourism Infrastructure and Enterprise Zone Authority (2010–2015), former Governor of Pampanga (2004–2007)	Lito Lapid (father)	No
Cresente Paez	Independent	Coop-NATCCO Party-list Representative (2010–present, 1998–2001), Party-list Coalition Foundation Chairman	none	No
Kiko Pangilinan	Liberal	former Presidential Assistant for Food Security and Agricultural Modernization (2014–2015), Senator of the Philippines (2001–2013), former Councilor of Quezon City (1988–1992)	none	Yes
Jericho Petilla	Liberal	former Secretary of the Department of Energy (2012–2015), former Governor of Leyte (2004–2012)	Leopoldo E. Petilla (father), Remedios Matin Petilla (mother), Leopoldo Dominico Petilla (brother)	No
Ralph Recto	Liberal	Senator of the Philippines (2010–present, 2001–2007) former Director-General of the National Economic and Development Authority (2008–2009), former Batangas' 4th district Representative (1992–2001)	Vilma Santos (wife), Ricky Recto (brother) Rafael Recto (father), Claro M. Recto (grandfather)	Yes
Joel Villanueva	Liberal	former Technical Education and Skills Development Authority Director General (2010–2015), former Member of the Philippine House of Representatives from CIBAC Partylist (2001–2010)	Eduardo "Jon-Jon" Villanueva (brother)	Yes

== Results ==
7 out of the 12 candidates under the Koalisyon ng Daang Matuwid won a seat in the Senate.

Rank	Candidate	Votes	%
1	Franklin Drilon	18,607,391	41.52%
2	Joel Villanueva	18,459,222	41.39%
4	Panfilo Lacson	16,926,152	37.82%
8	Francis Pangilinan	15,955,949	35.56%
9	Risa Hontiveros	15,915,213	35.53%
11	Ralph Recto	14,271,868	31.79%
12	Leila de Lima	14,144,070	31.55%
17	TG Guingona	10,331,157	22.92%
18	Jericho Petilla	7,046,580	15.77%
19	Mark Lapid	6,594,190	14.71%
34	Ina Ambolodto	1,696,558	3.62%
40	Cresente Paez	808,623	1.80%
