= Miriam Defensor Santiago 2016 presidential campaign =

3rd presidential campaign attempt of Miriam Defensor Santiago

- Campaign: 2016 Philippine presidential election
- Candidate: Miriam Defensor Santiago; Secretary of Agrarian Reform (1989–90); Judge of the International Criminal Court (2011–14); Senator of the Philippines (1995–2001; 2004–16); Bongbong Marcos; Senator of the Philippines (2010–16); Governor of Ilocos Norte (1983–86; 1998–2007); Ilocos Norte's 2nd district representative (1992–95; 2007–10); Vice Governor of Ilocos Norte (1980–83)
- Affiliation: People's Reform Party; Youth Reform Movement
- Status: Announced: October 13, 2015; Official launch: October 13, 2015; Lost election: May 9, 2016
- Headquarters: Narsan Building, 3 West 4th St., West Triangle, Quezon City
- Slogan: Si Miriam Ang Sagot! (lit. "Miriam is the answer!")

Website
- miriam.com.ph/newsblog/

The 2016 presidential campaign of Miriam Defensor Santiago, a then-incumbent Senator of the Philippines, was announced on October 13, 2015, at a book signing event. Miriam Defensor-Santiago submitted her certificate of candidacy (COC) on October 16, 2015. She was fifth overall in the election and lost to Rodrigo Duterte. Santiago died of lung cancer five months later.

== Background ==
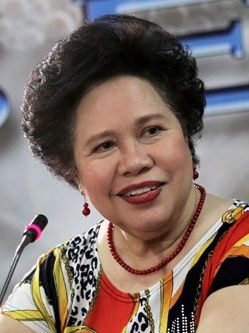
Miriam Defensor Santiago

Miriam Defensor Santiago previously ran for president in the elections of 1992 and 1998.

It was reported in March 2014 that Santiago was not interested in vying for a higher post, saying that she would rather support a female candidate for presidency. She said that she had no funds for a presidential campaign, but argued that social media would be a significant factor in the 2016 election.

On July 2, 2014, Santiago announced that she was diagnosed with stage 4 lung cancer. However, she said that her cancer is not metastasic and is expected to be cured within six weeks through molecularly targeted therapy.

In August 2014, Santiago declared that she was open to run as president, saying that she was recovering and considering two other career options: entering the International Development Law Organization based in Rome, or authoring books about foreign policy at the Wilson Center in Washington, D.C.

In November 2014, Santiago announced that she will run for president if she is completely healed of cancer, saying that, at that time, 90 percent of her cancer cells had regressed. She also said that she was considering entering a coalition with the Liberal Party and Nacionalista Party if she decided to run.

On October 26, 2015, a meet-and-greet event in front of UP students was held in UP Bahay ng Alumni (the same place where her co-presidential candidate Grace Poe announced her intention to run for president). Santiago reiterated that she would run for the highest political position in the Philippines for the third time to stop the corruption in the government despite having stage 4 lung cancer:

I have passed through the hardest of physical trepidations and hardships known to man. Cancer is not an easy disease to have. I decided upon consultation with my doctors at Saint Luke's Medical Center that it should be up to me to run for president.

— Miriam Defensor Santiago

== Running mate ==
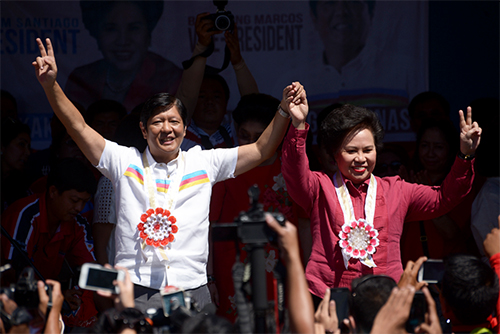
Defensor Santiago with her running mate, Bongbong Marcos

In July 2014, Bongbong Marcos said that he was not discounting the possibility of his running for president and, at that time, he said that his Nacionalista Party had only discussed about their agenda in the 2016 election.

It was reported in September 2014, that Santiago considered Rodrigo Duterte, Grace Poe and Gilberto Teodoro as her running mates.

On October 15, 2015, Senator Miriam Defensor Santiago confirmed Senator Bongbong Marcos as her running mate. Santiago and Marcos are two of the three senators who acquitted Renato Corona in his impeachment trial in 2012 (the other senator was the late Joker Arroyo).

Marcos revealed on January 21, 2016, that his campaign with Santiago would be officially launched in the Ilocos region, his home region. He also said that he and Santiago would campaign separately if possible to maximize their reach.

Santiago and Marcos started their campaigns with a proclamation rally held in Mariano Marcos State University in Batac, Ilocos Norte on February 9, 2016.

Marcos, on the other hand, inaugurated his campaign headquarters in Mandaluyong on February 18, 2016.

== Political positions ==
=== Corruption ===
In relation to the Priority Development Assistance Fund scandal, Santiago promised to put those who have pocketed their Priority Development Assistance Fund, commonly known as pork barrel to be arrested.

=== Governance ===
According to Defensor Santiago's running mate Bongbong Marcos, he and the candidate agreed on the importance of good governance.

She has also promised to sign the Freedom of Information Act as the act is an "important tool to promote public accountability."

=== Social and economy issues ===
Defensor Santiago also plans to "aggressively fight the war against illegal drugs". She has promised to reform the tax system and increase government efficiency, with the goal of keeping the government deficit below 3% of the GDP. Defensor Santiago also plans to invest in public infrastructure, agriculture sector, and government institutions.

=== RH Law ===
An advocate of the Reproductive Health Law (RHL), Defensor Santiago was not pleased by the 1 billion peso budget allocation cuts for contraceptives. She said that, if she will be elected, she will work for a full and conscientious implementation of the RHL.

== Endorsements ==
Miriam Defensor Santiago

Current and former Philippine Representative

- Imelda Marcos, wife of former President Ferdinand Marcos, incumbent Representative of Ilocos Norte (2nd District)

Current and former Philippine Governor

- Imee Marcos, Governor (Ilocos Norte)

City Councilor

- Ramon Yabut, Member, Sangguniang Panlungsod (Pasay)

Former Chief Justice of the Supreme Court

- Renato Corona

Personalities

- Cecille Ongpauco, mother of Heart Evangelista

Athletes

- Carmela Tunay, volleyball player and TV host
- Kathy Bersola, volleyball player
Bongbong Marcos

All individuals are members or supporters of the KBL, unless otherwise stated.

Former Philippine Presidents

- Joseph Estrada

Current and former Philippine Senators

- Cynthia Villar

Current and former Philippine Representatives

- Imelda Marcos, wife of former President Ferdinand Marcos, Incumbent Representative of Ilocos Norte (2nd District)
- Mitos Magsaysay, former Representative (Zambales)
- Prospero Nograles, former House Speaker and Representative (Davao City)
- Rodolfo Fariñas, Incumbent Representative of Ilocos Norte (1st District)
- Mark Cojuangco, former Representative of Pangasinan
- Trisha Bonoan-David, 4th District Representative of Manila
- Antonio Lagdameo, Jr., incumbent Representative of Davao del Norte
- Jonathan dela Cruz, incumbent Representative of ABAKADA Party-List and Marcos' campaign manager
- Mark Villar, incumbent Representative of Las Piñas
- Lucy Torres, incumbent Representative of Leyte

Current and former Provincial Governors and Vice Governors

- Imee Marcos, Governor (Ilocos Norte)
- Chavit Singson, former Governor of Ilocos Sur
- Ryan Singson, Governor (Ilocos Sur)
- Ramil Hernandez, Governor (Laguna)
- Faustino "Bodjie" Dy, incumbent Isabela Governor
- Casimiro Ynares Jr., former Rizal Governor
- Rebecca Ynares, incumbent Rizal Governor

Current and former Philippine Mayors and Vice Mayors

- Jerry Pelayo, former Mayor (Candaba, Pampanga)
- Pablo Ortega, Mayor (San Fernando, La Union)
- Guia Gomez, Mayor (San Juan City)
- Benjamin Abalos, Jr. Mayor (Mandaluyong)
- Casimiro Ynares III, former Rizal Governor, Mayor Antipolo City, (Bong Revilla's brother in law)
- Vergel Aguilar, Mayor (Las Piñas)

City Councilor

- Ramon Yabut, Member, Sangguniang Panlungsod (Pasay)

Former Chief Justice of the Supreme Court

- Renato Corona (now deceased)

Celebrities

- Nora Aunor, actress
- John Estrada, actor
- Alex Gonzaga, TV host and actress, daughter of Taytay, Rizal vice mayor Bonoy Gonzaga
- Toni Gonzaga, TV host and actress, daughter of Taytay, Rizal vice mayor Bonoy Gonzaga
- Richard Gomez, actor, sportsman and Ormoc mayoralty candidate
- Paul Soriano, film director
- Dawn Zulueta, TV host and actress, wife of Davao Representative Anton Lagdameo
- Ferdinand Topacio, lawyer (a member of Iglesia ni Cristo)

Organizations and Support Groups

- Alliance of Transport Organizations (ACTO)
- El Shaddai
- Federation of Jeepney Operators and Drivers Association of the Philippines (FEJODAP)
- Iglesia ni Cristo
- Iglesia Filipina Independente
- Kabataang Barangay Alumni Association Inc., Manila Chapter
- Liga ng Transportasyon at Operators sa Pilipinas (LTOP)
- National Federation of Sugarcane Planters
- Panay Federation of Sugarcane Planters
- Pangkalahatang Sanggunian Manila & Suburbs Drivers Association Nationwide, Inc. (PASANG MASDA)
- Pwersa ng Bayaning Atleta (Aldub - Alyansang Duterte-Bongbong)
- Sugar Producers Association (CONFED) Negros-Panay Chapter
- United Sugar Producers Federation of the Philippines

== Senate slate ==
The 10-man senatorial slate of Santiago and Marcos was announced during a campaign event at the Ynares Sports Arena on February 14, 2016.

Santiago-Marcos senatorial slate
Name	Image	Political party/coalition	Notes
Dionisio Santiago		Independent	Former PDEA director-general
Francis Tolentino		Independent	Former MMDA chairman
Martin Romualdez		Lakas	Leyte representative
Common candidates
Name	Image	Political party/coalition	Notes
Edu Manzano		Lakas/PGP	Makati vice mayor
Isko Moreno		PMP/PGP	Manila vice mayor
Susan Ople		Nacionalista/PGP	OFW advocate
Jericho Petilla		Liberal/Daang Matuwid	Former Secretary of Energy
Ralph Recto		Liberal/Daang Matuwid*	President pro tempore of the Senate of the Philippines
Manny Pacquiao		UNA	Sarangani representative
Joel Villanueva		Liberal/Bangon Pilipinas/Daang Matuwid	Former TESDA director-general

(*) also running under Partido Galing at Puso.

== Aftermath ==
Five months after the elections, Santiago died in her sleep at exactly 8:52 a.m. on 29 September 2016 while she was confined at the St. Luke's Medical Center in Taguig from lung cancer; several reports cited that Santiago died in her residence in La Vista Subdivision, Quezon City. Her body lay in state at the Cathedral Grottos of the Immaculate Conception Cathedral in Cubao the following day. Following a Catholic funeral Mass, she was interred at the Loyola Memorial Park in Marikina on 2 October, beside the tomb of her son Alexander, who died in 2003.
