= Jejomar Binay 2016 presidential campaign =

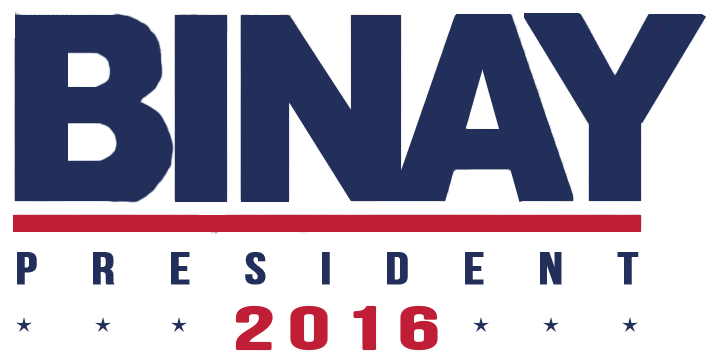
- Campaign: 2016 Philippine presidential election
- Candidate: Jejomar Binay; Vice President of the Philippines (2010 – 2016); Mayor of Makati (1986 – 1987; February 2, 1988 – June 30, 1998; 2001 – 2010); Metropolitan Manila Development Authority Chairman (1998 – 2001); Gregorio Honasan; Senator of the Philippines (1995 – 2004; 2007 – 2019)
- Affiliation: United Nationalist Alliance
- Status: Announced: September 14, 2011; Launched: July 1, 2015; Lost election: May 9, 2016
- Headquarters: 8514 Caong Street, San Antonio Village, Makati, Philippines
- Key people: List of key people: Ronaldo Puno (campaign adviser); Nancy Binay (adviser for advertisements); Jejomar Binay, Jr. (adviser for campaign sorties); Toby Tiangco (UNA president); Joey Salgado (communications director); Rico Paulo Quicho (spokesperson); Mon Ilagan (spokesperson); Gregorio Honasan (UNA vice president); JV Bautista (UNA secretary-general); Gary Teves (UNA treasurer and economic policy adviser); Jay Layug (policy adviser); Danilo Suarez (adviser)
- Slogan(s): Ginhawa'y dama ng lahat kay Jojo Binay (lit. Convenience is felt by all with Jojo Binay)
- Chant: Only Binay!

The 2016 presidential campaign of Jejomar Binay, former mayor of Makati and then-incumbent Vice President of the Philippines, was announced on July 1, 2015, during the launch of the United Nationalist Alliance as a political party at the Makati Coliseum.

Binay had decided to run for president in September 2011, just over a year after assuming the vice presidency.

== Campaign ==
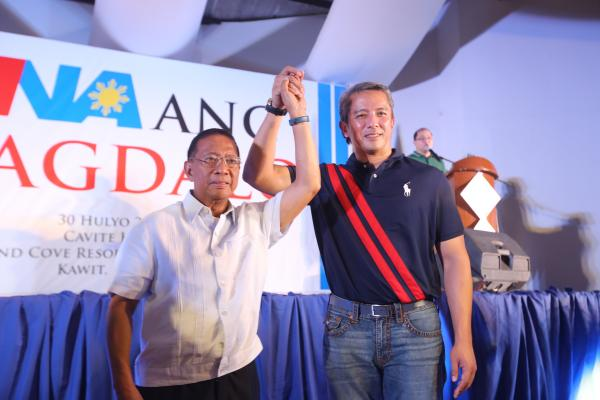
UNA, and Partido Magdalo signing of a coalition agreement. Shown are Binay (left) and Jonvic Remulla (right) who is the incumbent governor of Cavite.

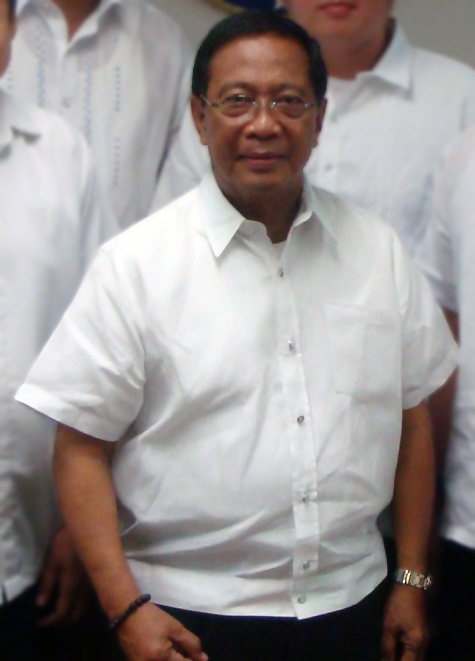
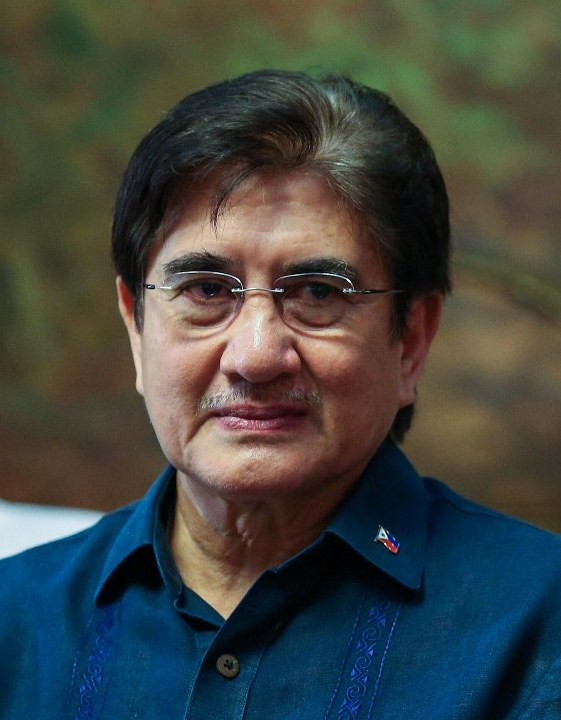
Jejomar Binay & Gregorio Honasan

In May 2014, Binay began his search for a running mate. As his potential running mate Senator Jinggoy Estrada in jail due to his implication in the PDAF scam, Binay's offers were declined by JV Ejercito, Manny Villar (via wife Cynthia Villar), Vilma Santos (via husband Ralph Recto), Mar Roxas, Grace Poe, Rodrigo Duterte and Joseph Estrada. Binay's daughter Abigail, also the Representative from Makati, said that Binay would accept anyone as his running mate except for Antonio Trillanes, and that she prefers Grace Poe. On June 12, Independence Day, speech in Iloilo, President Aquino said that he could only offer Binay the conduct of a clean and honest election, but not an outright endorsement.

On June 22, Binay resigned from the Aquino cabinet, both as presidential adviser on Overseas Filipino Workers' concerns and as chairman of the Housing and Urban Development Coordinating Council, but did not say why. Two days later, Binay addressed the public from his Coconut Palace offices, branding the current administration as "manhid at palpak" (insensitive and bumbling), but did not mention Aquino by name. He also accused the administration of committing sins against him and the people.

In June 2015 he polled first among expected presidential candidates for the 2016 Philippine general election. However, in the September 2015 Pulse Asia he placed third after Senator Grace Poe and Mar Roxas, the ruling Liberal Party presidential candidate. His trust rating had also dropped 19%.

According to Inquirer.Net, his numbers have steadily eroded after corruption allegations came out against him in the Philippine Senate Blue Ribbon Committee hearings.

In September 2015, Binay tapped the services of former Secretary of the Interior and Local Government Ronaldo Puno as the campaign strategist and adviser for its presidential bid.

On October 10, 2015, the Federation of Free Workers (FFW), one of the largest labor centers, in the Philippines endorsed him for President

During the Sinulog Festival in Cebu, Binay was booed by the spectators at the start of the Grand Parade of the festival on January 17, 2016. The Vice President's camp tags the Liberal Party as responsible for the booing incident.

Binay's presidential campaign started with a proclamation rally held in Welfareville Compound, Mandaluyong on February 9, 2016.

On February 16, 2016, Binay's party UNA and One Cebu party (with former GSIS chairman Winston Garcia as the party's gubernatorial bet in 2016 Cebu local elections) form a local coalition in the province of Cebu during the local party's general assembly.

== Platform ==
During the 41st Philippine Business Conference on October 27, 2015, Binay outlined his platform:

1. establish more effective monitoring and supervision of priority programs and projects
2. amendments in the 1987 constitution regardless of the economic provisions
3. passage of the Fiscal Incentives Rationalization Act and Right-Of-Way Act
4. amendments in the Build-Operate-Transfer Law
5. creation of the Department of Information Technology
6. reducing personal and income taxes
7. strengthened mining, agriculture and manufacturing industries
8. accelerate infrastructure development
9. respect the sanctity of contracts
10. lowering of income and corporate taxes
11. revisit the taxation system.

In his appearance in the 9th Biennial National Convention of the Chinese Filipino Business Club on February 19, 2016, Binay stated his intention to separate the DENR into two separated agencies if he were to be elected. The two agencies would be the Department of Environment and the Department of Natural Resources (the role of DA will also be moved to DNR). The same scenario will also be used for the DOTC which will be splitting into Department of Transportation and the Department of Information and Communication Technology. He also vowed to create the Department of Housing and Urban Development which focused on the construction of housing projects in the country. Binay also vowed to appoint a new Bureau of Internal Revenue (BIR) 30 minutes after the oath of the office, to replace Kim Henares.

== Controversies ==
Corruption allegations hounding him have been the subject of 22 hearings by the Senate Blue Ribbon Committee since August 2014, which has ventured into tackling other Makati projects and partnerships that were supposedly carried out through anomalous deals as well.

Among the names floated during the series of Senate inquiries to be linked with Mr. Binay's questionable deals include the housing agency Pag-IBIG, the Boy Scouts of the Philippines, and a listed firm owned by businessman Antonio L. Tiu, who is said to have acted as a dummy for Mr. Binay's wealth.

The Office of the Ombudsman upheld its decision to indict Vice President Jejomar Binay, his son dismissed Makati mayor Jejomar Erwin "Junjun" Binay Jr, and 22 others over the alleged overpricing of the Makati city hall parking building II.

In two separate resolutions on 6 docketed cases, the Ombudsman said it has jurisdiction to conduct its preliminary investigation that led it to find probable cause to file criminal charges against Binay, his son, and their co-respondents for graft, malversation of public funds, and falsification of public documents in connection with the bidding and construction of the carpark project.

== Endorsements ==
Jejomar Binay

Presidents of the Philippines

- Joseph Estrada, 13th President of the Philippines (1998–2001), 9th Vice President of the Philippines (1992–1998), former Senator of the Philippines (1987–1992)

Current and former government officials

- Margarito Teves, 30th Secretary of Finance (2005–10)

Current and former senators

- Nancy Binay, incumbent senator, daughter
- JV Ejercito, incumbent senator
- Jinggoy Estrada, incumbent senator
- Gregorio Honasan, incumbent senator, vice presidential running mate
- Ernesto Maceda, former senator
- Juan Ponce Enrile, incumbent senator

Current and former representatives

- Abigail Binay, representative from Makati's 2nd District, daughter
- Boying Remulla, former representative from Cavite
- Eduardo Cojuangco, Jr., former representative from Tarlac, San Miguel Corporation chairman
- Mark Cojuangco, former representative from Pangasinan
- Arnulfo Fuentebella, 19th Speaker of the House of Representatives (2000–01)
- Felix William Fuentebella, representative from Camarines Sur
- Mitos Magsaysay, representative from Zambales
- Manny Pacquiao, representative from Sarangani, retired boxer, senatorial candidate
- Toby Tiangco, representative from Navotas
- Luis Villafuerte, representative from Camarines Sur

Current and former provincial governors and vice governors

- Hermilando Mandanas, former Governor of Batangas
- Jonvic Remulla, governor of Cavite
- Chavit Singson, former Governor of Ilocos Sur
- Roberto Pagdanganan, former Governor of Bulacan

Current and former mayors and municipal officials

- Jejomar Binay, Jr., former mayor of Makati, son
- Joseph Estrada, mayor of Manila
- Mauricio Domogan, mayor of Baguio
- Edna Sanchez, mayor of Santo Tomas, Batangas
- Cristina Gonzales-Romualdez, councilor of Tacloban
- Jerry Pelayo, former mayor of Candaba, Pampanga
- Michael Rama, mayor of Cebu City
- Alfred Romualdez, mayor of Tacloban

Celebrities

- Barbie Almalbis, singer-songwriter, daughter-in-law of running mate
- Menggie Cobarrubias, actor
- Pilita Corrales, singer-songwriter
- Faith Cuneta, singer
- Rita De Guzman, actress, singer
- Ai-Ai delas Alas, actress, comedian
- Jhong Hilario, actor, dancer
- Alma Moreno, actress, senatorial candidate
- Kristina Paner, actress, singer
- Rico J. Puno, singer
- Vandolph, actor, comedian
- Bobby Yan, TV host

Other people

- Romel Mendoza, secretary-general, Kalipunan ng Masang Pilipino (KAMPIL)

Organizations

- 1-AHAPO Party List
- AGRI Party-list
- Alliance of Concerned Transport Operators
- El Shaddai
- Kababaihan ng Maynila Foundation
- Kabayan Party-list
- Kalipunan ng Masang Pilipino
- League of Cities of the Philippines
- Manila Horse Power
- One Cebu Party (withdrew on March 21)
- Sabiel Almuhtadeen Foundation-Philippines
- Sultanate of Sulu
Gringo Honasan

Presidents of the Philippines

- Joseph Estrada, 13th President of the Philippines (1998–2001), 9th Vice President of the Philippines (1992–1998), former Senator of the Philippines (1987–1992)

Current and former representatives

- Abigail Binay, representative from Makati's 2nd District, daughter
- Boying Remulla, former representative from Cavite
- Eduardo Cojuangco, Jr., former representative from Tarlac, San Miguel Corporation chairman
- Mark Cojuangco, former representative from Pangasinan
- Arnulfo Fuentebella, 19th Speaker of the House of Representatives (2000–01)
- Felix William Fuentebella, representative from Camarines Sur
- Mitos Magsaysay, representative from Zambales
- Manny Pacquiao, representative from Sarangani, retired boxer, senatorial candidate
- Toby Tiangco, representative from Navotas
- Luis Villafuerte, representative from Camarines Sur

Current and former provincial governors and vice governors

- Hermilando Mandanas, former Governor of Batangas
- Jonvic Remulla, governor of Cavite
- Chavit Singson, former Governor of Ilocos Sur
- Roberto Pagdanganan, former Governor of Bulacan

Current and former mayors and municipal officials

- Jejomar Binay, Jr., former mayor of Makati, son
- Joseph Estrada, mayor of Manila
- Mauricio Domogan, mayor of Baguio
- Edna Sanchez, mayor of Santo Tomas, Batangas
- Cristina Gonzales-Romualdez, councilor of Tacloban
- Jerry Pelayo, former mayor of Candaba, Pampanga
- Michael Rama, mayor of Cebu City
- Alfred Romualdez, mayor of Tacloban

Celebrities

- Barbie Almalbis, singer-songwriter, daughter-in-law

Organizations

- Kababaihan ng Maynila Foundation

== Senate slate ==
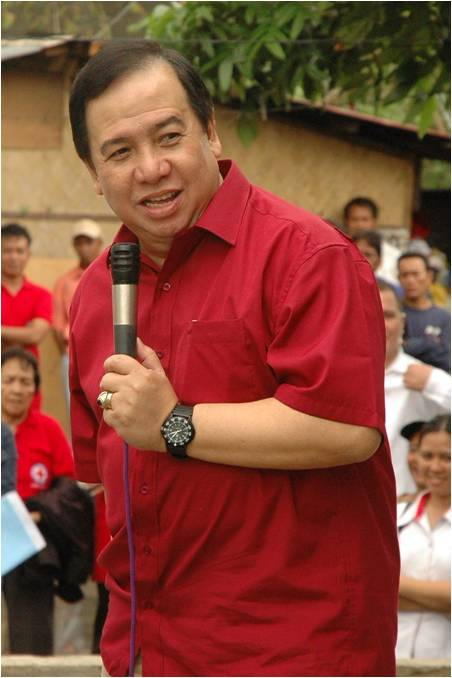
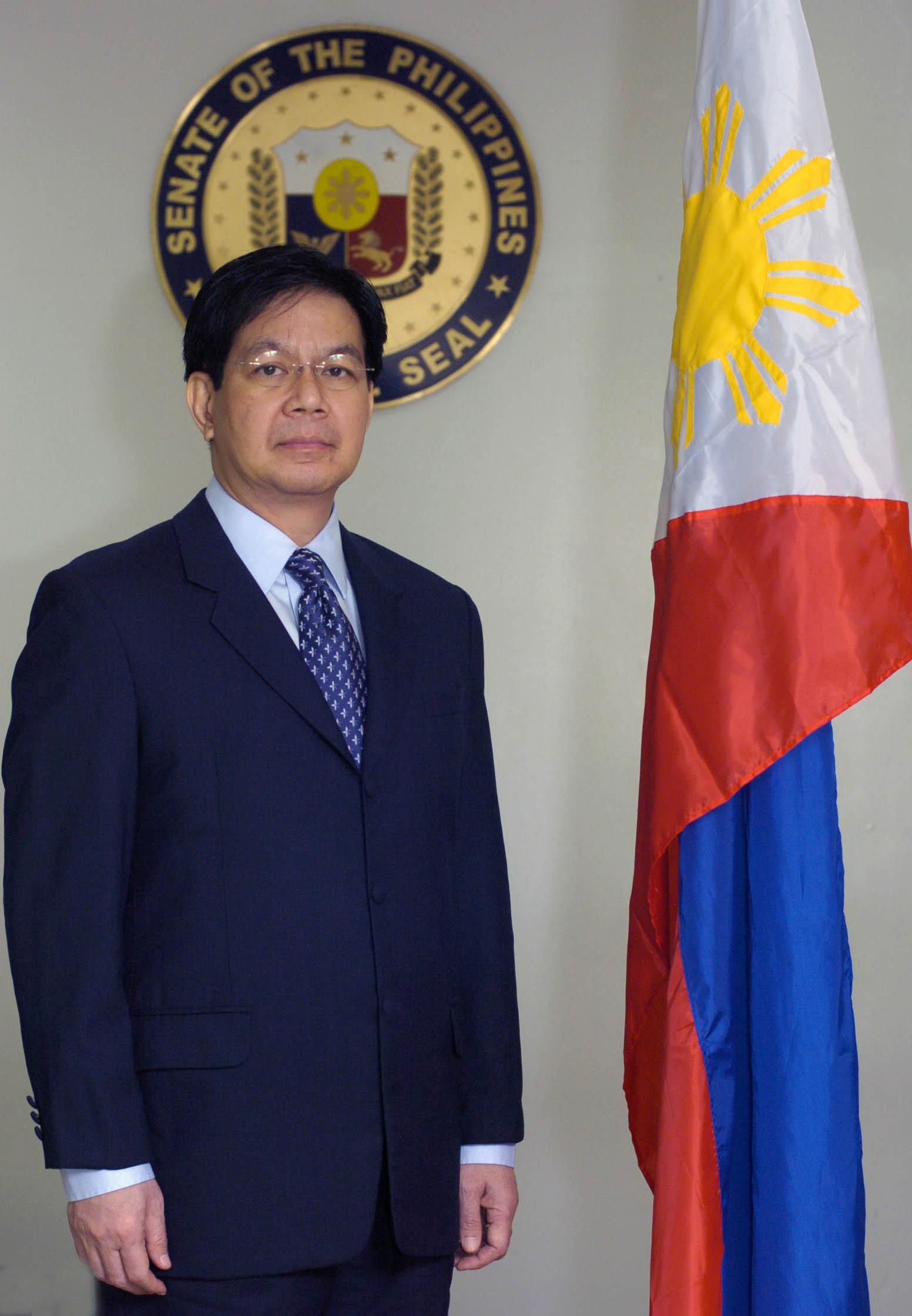
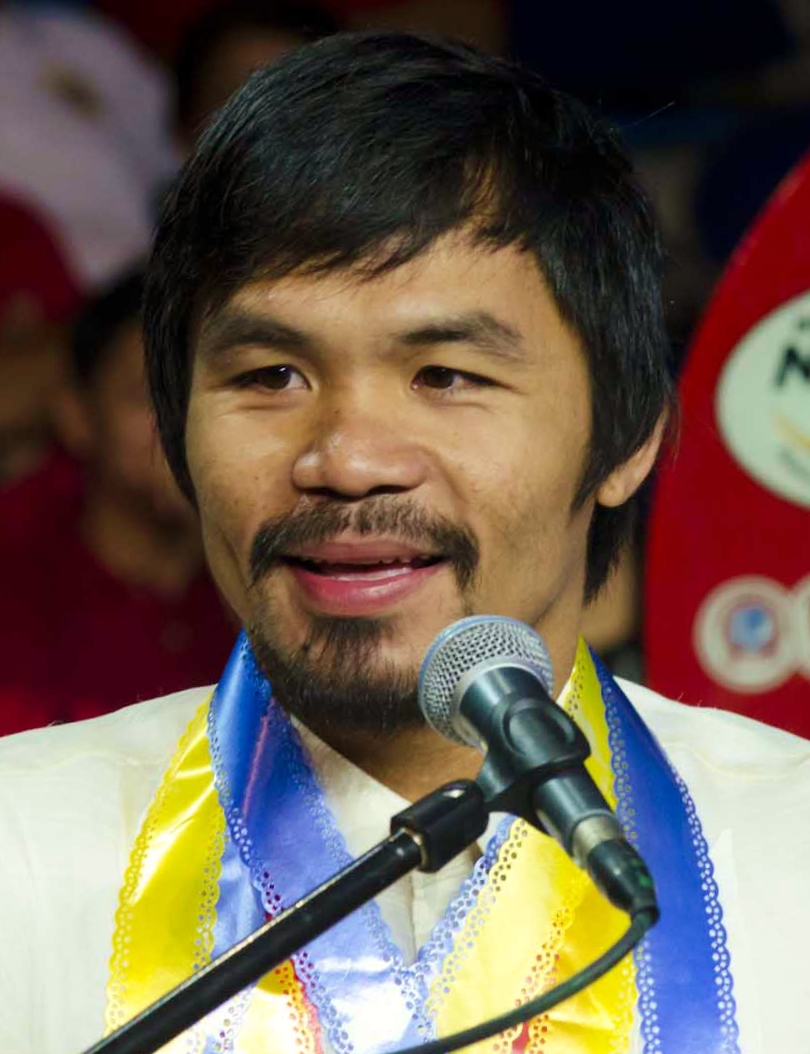
Richard Gordon, Panfilo Lacson, & Manny Pacquiao

=== United Nationalist Alliance ===
- Jacel Kiram (UNA) – Daughter of Jamalul Kiram III (Sultan of the Sultanate of Sulu)
- Alma Moreno (UNA) – Incumbent Parañaque City Council member (1st District), incumbent National chairman Philippine Councilors League, actress
- Rey Langit (UNA) – Radio and TV Broadcaster
- Allan Montaño (UNA) – Pro-bono labor rights Lawyer (Federation of Free Workers, Nagkaisa)
- Getulio Napeñas (UNA) – former Special Action Force (SAF) Director
- Manny Pacquiao (PCM) – Incumbent Sarangani Representative, Boxer, actor, Singer, Head Coach-Mahindra (PBA)

=== Guest candidates ===
- Richard J. Gordon (Bagumbayan-VNP), Philippine Red Cross chairman and former senator
- Panfilo Lacson, former Presidential Assistant for Rehabilitation and Recovery and former senator
- Susan Ople (Nacionalista)
- Martin Romualdez (Lakas–CMD), Leyte representative, Bongbong Marcos's cousin
- Tito Sotto (NPC) Acting Senate Minority Floor Leader and Eat Bulaga! host
- Migz Zubiri, former senator and former Bukidnon representative
