= Candidates in the 2016 Philippine Senate election =

These are the people who, at one time or another, had been considered, announced, declined or withdrew his or her candidacy in the 2016 Philippine Senate election.

== Qualified candidates ==
These are the commission's approved candidates as of January 21, 2016:

#	Nominee	Coalition	Party	Previous political title	Gender
1	Shariff Albani		Independent		Male
2	Aldin Ali		LM		Male
3	Rafael Alunan		Independent	Secretary of the Interior and Local Government	Male
4	Ina Ambolodto	Koalisyon ng Daang Matuwid	Liberal	Maguindanao acting governor	Female
5	Godofredo Arquiza		Independent	Senior Citizens party-list representative	Male
6	Levito Baligod		Independent		Male
7	Greco Belgica		Independent	Manila councilor	Male
8	Walden Bello		Independent	Akbayan party-list representative	Male
9	Sandra Cam		PMP		Female
10	Melchor Chavez		LM		Male
11	Neri Colmenares	Partido Galing at Puso	Makabayan	Bayan Muna party-list representative	Male
12	Leila de Lima	Koalisyon ng Daang Matuwid	Liberal	Secretary of Justice	Female
13	Isko Moreno Domagoso	Partido Galing at Puso	PMP	Manila vice mayor	Male
14	Ray Dorona		Independent		Male
15	Franklin Drilon	Koalisyon ng Daang Matuwid	Liberal	Senate president	Male
16	Larry Gadon		KBL		Male
17	Win Gatchalian	Partido Galing at Puso	NPC	Representative from Valenzuela	Male
18	Richard J. Gordon	Partido Galing at Puso	Independent	Former Senator/Phil. Red Cross Director	Male
19	TG Guingona	Koalisyon ng Daang Matuwid	Liberal	Senator	Male
20	Risa Hontiveros	Koalisyon ng Daang Matuwid	Akbayan	Akbayan party-list representative	Female
21	Eid Kabalu		Independent	Spokesperson, Moro Islamic Liberation Front	Male
22	Lorna Kapunan	Partido Galing at Puso	Aksyon		Female
23	Jacel Kiram		UNA	Sultanate of Sulu princess and daughter of Sultan Jamalul Kiram III	Female
24	Alma Moreno Lacsamana		UNA	Parañaque councilor	Female
25	Panfilo Lacson	Koalisyon ng Daang Matuwid	Independent	Senator and Philippine National Police (PNP) chief superintendent	Male
26	Rey Langit		UNA		Male
27	Mark Lapid	Koalisyon ng Daang Matuwid	Aksyon	Tourism Infrastructure and Enterprise Zone Authority (TIEZA) chief-operating-officer and Pampanga governor	Male
28	Dante Liban		Independent	Representative from Quezon City	Male
29	Romeo Maganto		Lakas	PNP chief superintendent	Male
30	Edu Manzano	Partido Galing at Puso	Independent	Makati vice mayor and Optical Media Board chairperson	Male
31	Allan Montano		UNA		Male
32	Ramon Montaño		Independent	Philippine Army general	Male
33	Getulio Napeñas		UNA	PNP Special Action Force chief	Male
34	Susan Ople	Partido Galing at Puso	Nacionalista	Undersecretary of Labor and Employment	Female
35	Sergio Osmeña III		Independent	Senator	Male
36	Manny Pacquiao		UNA	Representative from Sarangani	Male
37	Cresente Paez	Koalisyon ng Daang Matuwid	Independent	Coop-NATCCO party-list representative	Male
38	Samuel Pagdilao	Partido Galing at Puso	Independent	ACT-CIS party-list representative	Male
39	Jovito Palparan		Independent	Bantay party-list representative and Philippine Army general	Male
40	Francis Pangilinan	Koalisyon ng Daang Matuwid	Liberal	Senator	Male
41	Jericho Petilla	Koalisyon ng Daang Matuwid	Liberal	Secretary of Energy and Leyte governor	Male
42	Ralph Recto	Koalisyon ng Daang Matuwid	Liberal	Senator	Male
43	Martin Romualdez		Lakas	Representative from Leyte	Male
44	Roman Romulo	Partido Galing at Puso	Independent	Representative from Pasig	Male
45	Dionisio Santiago		Independent	Philippine Drug Enforcement Agency (PDEA) director general	Male
46	Tito Sotto	Partido Galing at Puso	NPC	Senator	Male
47	Francis Tolentino		Independent	Metropolitan Manila Development Authority (MMDA) chairman	Male
48	Diosdado Valeroso		Independent	PNP chief superintendent	Male
49	Joel Villanueva	Koalisyon ng Daang Matuwid	Liberal	Technical Education and Skills Development Authority (TESDA) director general and Citizens' Battle Against Corruption (CIBAC) party-list representative	Male
50	Migz Zubiri	Partido Galing at Puso	Independent	Senator and representative from Bukidnon	Male
