= 2016 Lipa local elections =

Philippine election results

2016 Lipa mayoral election
- May 9, 2016
Nominee	Meynardo Sabili	Edgardo Mendoza
Party	UNA	Liberal
Running mate	Raul Montealto	Eric Africa
Popular vote	95,550	46,235
Percentage	67.38	32.62
Mayor before election
Meynardo Sabili
UNA
Elected mayor
Meynardo Sabili
UNA

Local elections was held in Lipa City on May 9, 2016 within the Philippine general election. The voters will elect candidates for the elective local posts in the city: the mayor, vice mayor, the congressman (which will represent Batangas' sixth district which is composed of just the city), two provincial board members, and the 12 members of its city council.

Unlike in the 2013 elections, voters of the city will be electing its first member in the House of Representatives, two representatives to the Batangas provincial board, and two more councilors thus bringing the councilors' total to 12 as opposed to the previous 10.

== Background ==
=== Mayoral and vice mayoral elections ===
Incumbent mayor Meynardo Sabili is running for his third and final term as Mayor of the City of Lipa. He assumed the mayorship in 2010, defeating then-incumbent and former 4th District representative Oscar Gozos. This is despite Sabili's disqualification to run because of residency dispute. Sabili, a former provincial board member used to be a registered voter Barangay Sico 1, San Juan, Batangas and transferred to Barangay Pinagtong-Ulan, Lipa City. However, the Supreme Court annulled and dismissed the Commission on Elections' ruling on Sabili's cancellation of his certificate of candidacy. He was initially known to be running under National Unity Party (NUP), with three-term councilor Raul Montealto as his running mate. (Montealto was barangay captain of Bugtong na Pulo before elected as councilor in 2007.). However, NUP withdrew their nomination of Team Sabili due to its membership of the Koalisyong Matuwid na Daan (known as Koalisyon ng Daang Matuwid), where the party has to endorse Liberal Party-nominated candidates even under the local level; therefore Sabili and his team will run as independents; hence Sabili's coalition was supported by Partido Galing at Puso of Poe-Escudero tandem, while Mendoza's coalition was supported by the aforementioned Liberal coalition (where Sabili's last party's nominee in the 2013 mid-term elections).

His opponent is Fiscal Edgardo "Gary" Mendoza, who is running under the Liberal Party, the party of incumbent governor and former city mayor Vilma Santos-Recto. His running mate is incumbent vice mayor Eric Africa. Africa was elected councilor from 1998 to 2007 then from 2010 until he was elected vice mayor in 2013.

==== Congressional election ====
Incumbent governor and former mayor Vilma Santos-Recto, who is barred for another term decided to run as for a seat at the new 6th legislative district of Batangas, which only comprises the City of Lipa. The city was a part of the 4th District of Batangas from 1987. This despite the call of supporters to run for a much higher position, especially as the vice presidential candidate of Mar Roxas. Recto became its first female city mayor from 1998 until she was elected first female governor of Batangas in 2007. Her main opponent is Bernadette Sabili, wife of Mayor Meynard Sabili. Sabili first ran as Representative of the 4th District of Batangas, but was defeated by incumbent representative Mark Llandro Mendoza. However, NUP withdrew her nomination due to its membership of the Koalisyong Matuwid na Daan, where the party has to endorse Liberal Party-nominated candidates even under the local level; therefore Sabili will run as independent.

== Candidates ==
=== District representative ===
2016 Philippine House of Representatives election in Batangas's 6th District (Lone District of Lipa City)
Party	Candidate	Votes	%
Liberal	Vilma Santos-Recto	83,492	58.00
NUP	Bernadette Sabili	60,472	42.00
Total votes		143,964	100.00

=== Provincial Board Members ===
Batangas 6th District Sangguniang Panlalawigan election
Party	Candidate	Votes	%
Liberal	Rowena Africa	94,575	48.99
Liberal	Lydio Lopez, Jr.	69,049	35.77
Independent	Romano Gonzales	32,436	16.80
Total votes		196,060	100.00

=== Mayor ===
Incumbent Mayor Meynardo Sabili is running for reelection. His opponent is fiscal Edgardo Mendoza.

Lipa City mayoralty elections
Party	Candidate	Votes	%
UNA	Meynardo Sabili (incumbent)	95,550	67.38
Liberal	Edgardo Mendoza	46,235	32.62
Total votes		141,785	100.00

=== Vice mayor ===
Incumbent Eric Africa is running for reelection. His opponent is incumbent councilor Raul Montealto.

Lipa City vice mayoralty elections
Party	Candidate	Votes	%
Liberal	Eric Africa (incumbent)	86,695	63.67
NPC	Raul Montealto	49,460	36.33
Total votes		136,155	100.00

=== Councilors ===
==== Team Recto-Mendoza-Africa ====
Liberal Party/Team Recto-Mendoza-Africa
Name	Party	Result
Leonilo Catipon	Liberal	Won
Josef Frederick Dijan	Liberal	Lost
Nelson Gonzales	Liberal	Lost
Oscar "Junjun" Gozos II	Liberal	Won
Pacita Leviste	Liberal	Lost
Miguel Lina III	Liberal	Lost
Mark Aries Luancing	Liberal	Won
Aries Macala	Liberal	Lost
Aries Emmanuel "Beebong" Mendoza	Liberal	Won
Mario Panganiban	Liberal	Lost
Merlo Silva	Liberal	Won
Jennifer Spye Toledo	Liberal	Lost

==== Team Sabili-Montealto ====
UNA/Team Sabili-Montealto
Name	Party	Result
Emmanuel de Castro	UNA	Won
Elpidio Lacorte	NPC	Lost
Carina Lina-Panganiban	UNA	Lost
Donato Linatoc	UNA	Lost
Camile Lopez	UNA	Won
Dominador Mauhay	UNA	Lost
Mario Medina	NPC	Lost
Nonato Monfero	NPC	Won
Joel Pua	NPC	Won
Avior Rocafort	NPC	Won
Ralph Peter Umali	NPC	Won
Gwendolyn Wong	UNA	Won

2016 Lipa City Council elections
Party	Candidate	Votes	%
UNA	Camille Angeline Lopez		
Liberal	Mark Aries Luancing		
UNA	Gwendolyn Wong		
NPC	Joel Pua		
NPC	Ralph Peter Umali		
Liberal	Oscar "Junjun" Gozos II		
Liberal	Merlo Silva		
Liberal	Leonilo Catipon		
NPC	Avior Rocafort		
Liberal	Aries Emmanuel Mendoza		
NPC	Nonato Monfero		
UNA	Emmanuel De Castro		
UNA	Donato Linatoc		
NPC	Mario Medina		
Liberal	Jennifer Spye Toledo		
Liberal	Pacita Leviste		
NPC	Elpidio Lacorte		
Liberal	Mike Lina		
Liberal	Aries Macala		
UNA	Dominador Mauhay		
Liberal	Josef Frederick Dijan		
Liberal	Nelson "Totoy" Gonzales		
UNA	Carina Lina-Panganiban		
NPC	Mario Panganiban		
PGP	Ariel Africa		
Independent	Ramir Bathan		
Bangon Pilipinas	Zenaida Garing		
PGP	Arven Bravo		
Nacionalista	Roy Sanggalang		
LDP	Sonia Milan-Crisostomo		
Lakas	Arlan Arnaiz		
Nacionalista	Arlan Jay Agojo		
UNA	Vergilio Felasol		
Lakas	Ireneo Aguillera		
Total votes			
