= 2016 Philippine Senate election =

32nd Philippine senatorial election

- May 9, 2016

12 (of the 24) seats to the Senate of the Philippines 13 seats needed for a majority
Alliance	KDM	PGP	UNA
Seats won	7	4	1
Popular vote	140,756,973	32,154,139	24,660,722
Percentage	43.81	30.83	7.68
Senate President before election
Franklin Drilon
Liberal
Elected Senate President
Koko Pimentel
PDP–Laban

The 32nd election of members to the Senate of the Philippines was held on Monday, May 9, 2016. The seats of 12 senators elected in 2010 were filled during this election. The winners in this election joined the winners of the 2013 election to form the 17th Congress of the Philippines. The senators elected in 2013 served until June 30, 2019, while the senators elected in this election would serve up to June 30, 2022.

The Senate election was part of the 2016 general election where elections for the president of the Philippines, vice president, members of the Philippine House of Representatives, and all local officials, including those from the Autonomous Region in Muslim Mindanao, were held.

The Senate election used a plurality-at-large voting system where the voter votes for 12 candidates, with each candidate getting one vote, and from which the twelve candidates with the highest number of votes are elected to serve for six years.

== Electoral system ==
Philippine senatorial elections are done via the plurality-at-large voting system: the entire country is one at-large "district", where a voter can vote up to twelve people (one vote per candidate), with the twelve candidates with the highest number of votes deemed elected. Senators who are currently serving their second consecutive term are term limited, although they may run again in 2019. Only half of the seats are up in every senatorial election. The winning senators replaced the batch elected in 2010, and joined the batch elected in 2013 in the 17th Congress.

Each party has a slate of as many candidates as it desires, although parties don't usually exceed a 12-person ticket. A party may also choose to invite "guest candidates" to complete its slate. The party may even include, with the candidates' consent, independent candidates and candidates from other parties as the party's guest candidates. A coalition of different parties may also be formed.

In general elections where senators and presidents are elected at the same time, the presidential candidates often have their own slates of senatorial candidates. This means voters have more choices unlike in midterm elections, when there are usually only two major contending political forces.

Winning candidates are proclaimed by the Commission on Elections (COMELEC) sitting as the National Board of Canvassers. Candidates are proclaimed senators-elect if the thirteenth-place candidate no longer has a mathematical chance of surpassing the twelfth-place candidate. Post-proclamation disputes are handled by the Senate Electoral Tribunal, a body composed of six senators and three justices from the Supreme Court.

== Coalitions ==
A coalition led by the Liberal Party (Liberal) of Interior and Local Government Secretary Mar Roxas, the successor of the administration-backed Team PNoy coalition In 2013, and the primary opposition United Nationalist Alliance of Vice President Jejomar Binay, put up senatorial slates. Aside from these coalitions, candidates running for president also put up their own opposition slates. Some candidates are included in more than one coalitions.

=== Koalisyon ng Daang Matuwid ===
The senatorial ticket of the Liberal Party called as "Koalisyon ng Daang Matuwid" (Coalition for the Straight Path), was unveiled last October 12, 2015 at the Liberal's headquarters in Cubao, Quezon City led by President Aquino III, and the Roxas and Robredo tandem.

In a resolution passed September 30, 2015, the Liberal National Directorate, and Liberal National Executive Council nominated incumbent senators Franklin Drilon, TG Guingona and Ralph Recto, former Department of Justice (DOJ) secretary Leila de Lima and former senator Francis Pangilinan for inclusion. Liberal Standard-bearer Mar Roxas also declared former Energy Secretary and former Leyte governor Jericho Petilla (Liberal) as part of the slate. On October 12, 2015, Interior and Local Government Assistant Secretary for Muslim Affairs and Special Concerns Ina Ambolodto, PhilHealth Board Director Risa Hontiveros, COOP-NATCCO Party List Representative Cresente Paez and Technical Education and Skills Development Authority Director General Joel Villanueva were included in the slate.

=== Partido Galing at Puso ===
The senatorial slate of Grace Poe, known as "Partido Galing at Puso," included independents and candidates from other political parties. The coalition line up was unveiled for the first time after the last day of filing on October 16, 2015. It included Manila vice mayor Isko Moreno, congressman Sherwin Gatchalian, worker advocate Susan Ople, incumbent senator Tito Sotto, Bayan Muna congressman Neri Colmenares, actor Edu Manzano, lawyer Lorna Kapunan, party-list congressman Samuel Pagdilao, former senator Migz Zubiri, and Richard J. Gordon, congressman Roman Romulo, On October 29, 2015 the senatorial coalition line up was unveiled at Club Filipino.

== Term-limited and retiring incumbents ==
=== Term limited ===
The following are barred from seeking reelection, although they can be elected anew in 2019:

1. Pia Cayetano (NP), running for House representative from Taguig's 2nd district
  Won the election for House representative from Taguig's 2nd district. Cayetano ran for senator in 2019 and won.
2. Miriam Defensor Santiago (PRP), running for president of the Philippines
  Ran for president and lost. Santiago subsequently died in September 2016.
3. Juan Ponce Enrile (UNA)
  In December 2013, Enrile said he would retire from politics, denying reports he would run for governor of Cagayan province. Enrile ran for senator in 2019 and lost.
4. Jinggoy Estrada (UNA)
  In detention due to corruption charges and his alleged involvement in the Priority Development Assistance Fund scam, Estrada told reporters that after his August 2014 bail hearing he would "run in 2016 for a higher office" and that he would be Vice President Jejomar Binay's running mate. However, this did not materialize, with Gregorio Honasan finally chosen by his party 's running to be Binay's running mate. Estrada ran for senator in 2019 and lost. Estrada ran again for senator in 2022 and won.
5. Lito Lapid (Independent), running for mayor of Angeles City
  In January 2015, Lapid announced that he would run for mayor of Angeles City. Lapid eventually lost. Lapid ran for senator in 2019 and won.
6. Bong Revilla (Lakas)
  In detention due to corruption charges and his alleged involvement in the Priority Development Assistance Fund scam, Revilla expressed that he was considering a 2016 presidential campaign and a return to show business. However, this did not materialize. Revilla ran for senator in 2019 and won.

Other incumbent senators may seek other political offices in 2016.

=== Retiring incumbents ===
The following senators' terms are ending in 2016, are eligible to run, but targeted other positions:

1. Bongbong Marcos (Independent), running for vice president of the Philippines
  Ran for vice president as Miriam Defensor Santiago's (PRP) running mate and lost.

=== Running for another office mid-term ===
The following senators' terms ended in 2019. They could run for other positions, but could return to the Senate if they lose; have they won, they were expected to forfeit their Senate seats once the terms of their new position started:

1. Alan Peter Cayetano (Independent), running for vice president of the Philippines
  Ran for vice president as Rodrigo Duterte's (PDP–Laban) running mate and lost.
2. Francis Escudero (Independent), running for vice president of the Philippines
  Ran for vice president as Grace Poe's (independent) running mate and lost.
3. Gregorio Honasan (UNA), running for vice president of the Philippines
  Ran for vice president as Jejomar Binay's (UNA) running mate and lost.
4. Grace Poe (Independent), running for president of the Philippines
  Ran for president and lost.
5. Antonio Trillanes (Independent), running for vice president of the Philippines
  Running for vice president with no running mate but is supporting Grace Poe's candidacy, and lost.

None of the candidates whose terms ended in 2019 won, thereby giving the Senate a full 24-person membership at the start of the upcoming Congress.

Cayetano is a member of the Nacionalista Party, so were Marcos and Trillanes, but all did not win that party's nomination to run as vice president. Instead, they were running as independents in the vice presidential election. Cayetano and Trillanes were expected to return to the Senate as Nacionalistas once the Senate opened its session for the 17th Congress.

== Campaign ==
In March 2015, Walden Bello resigned his position in Congress and from the Akbayan party, which is allied with President Benigno Aquino III, due to conflicts with Aquino that surrounded the Disbursement Acceleration Program and the Mamasapano incident. As a result of the Mamasapano clash, Getulio Napeñas was relieved from his position and later retired.

On May 20, 2015, the Office of the Ombudsman dismissed the complaint filed by former Iloilo provincial administrator Manuel Mejorada against Senator Franklin Drilon, DPWH Secretary Rogelio Singson, DOT Secretary Ramon Jimenez Jr., and other officials involved in the construction of the Iloilo Convention Center. On August 7, 2015, Senator Gringo Honasan, former CIBAC congressman and now TESDA chair Joel Villanueva, and seven other former and incumbent lawmakers were charged before the Office of the Ombudsman in connection with the pork barrel scam.

In August 2015, Leila de Lima assisted Isaias Samson, an expelled minister of Iglesia ni Cristo (INC), in filing a case against the sect. Members protested at the DOJ office the next day while others occupied EDSA in Mandaluyong a few days later to urge de Lima to resign, and give focus to the Mamasapano clash where two members of the INC were killed. On September 15, 2015, Francis Pangilinan announced his resignation from the cabinet of President Benigno Aquino III. On September 29, 2015, Francis Tolentino spoke in Cavite for his intention to run for the Senate under Aquino's Liberal Party. However, controversy surrounding a lewd performance in a political rally in Santa Cruz, Laguna forced him to resign from the party.

Grace Poe and Francis Escudero revealed that eight candidates were named on the initial list of their senatorial slate. On September 30, 2015, Poe endorsed Bayan Muna representative Neri Colmenares. On October 12, 2015, the Liberal Party announced its complete senatorial line-up in Quezon City under the Koalisyon ng Daang Matuwid. The United Nationalist Alliance completed their slate on October 21, 2015. Panfilo Lacson accused Poe of favoring actor Edu Manzano over himself on October 27, 2015 when it was reported that Manzano was joining the Senate slate of Poe. On October 29, 2015, Poe and Escudero announced in an event held in Club Filipino, San Juan, the complete senatorial slate for the Partido Galing at Puso coalition.

In an event commemorating Typhoon Haiyan in Tacloban on November 7, 2015, Martin Romualdez, the nephew of Imelda Marcos, declared his support for Jejomar Binay. On November 14, 2015, in an interview by ABS-CBN News Channel, Karen Davila asked Alma Moreno with questions regarding the Reproductive Health Law. The interview went viral when Moreno was unable to answer coherently. In November 2015, Princess Jacel Kiram and Malaysian politician Nurul Izzah Anwar posted a photo demanding Malaysian Prime Minister Najib Razak to free opposition leader Anwar Ibrahim which was received negatively in that country, prompting Nurul Izzah to apologize. On November 17, 2015, in a vote of 5–4, the Senate Electoral Tribunal denied the petition filed by aspiring 2016 presidential candidate Rizalito David for the disqualification of Grace Poe as a senator.

On December 14, 2015, the court rejected Jovito Palparan's bid to be released on bail despite his plea that he is running for Senate. On January 26, 2016, the Senate Blue Ribbon subcommittee concluded its hearings on the corruption allegations against Vice President and UNA presidential candidate Jejomar Binay.

Campaigning for the Senate elections began on February 9, 2016. The United Nationalist Alliance's campaign started with a proclamation rally held in Mandaluyong on that same day. The 10-person senatorial line-up of Miriam Defensor Santiago's campaign were unveiled during a campaign event at the Ynares Sports Arena on February 14, 2016. On February 15, 2016, PDP–Laban, the party of Rodrigo Duterte announced that it would not have a senatorial slate so that the party can concentrate on promoting the candidate.

On February 15, 2016, UNA senatorial candidate Manny Pacquiao, in a video statement posted by TV5 for its Bilang Pilipino coverage, made a comment on the issue of same-sex marriage. He described people in these marriages as "mas masahol pa sa hayop" (English Translation: behaving worse than animals.) Pacquiao later apologized and stated that as a Born Again Christian, he is against same-sex marriage, based on Biblical teachings but he did not condemn gay people. Nike ended their longtime partnership with Pacquiao stating that his comments against gay people were abhorrent. Bello filed a petition that may disqualify Pacquiao for violating election rules regarding publicity. Based on the commission's rules, Pacquiao's wife, Jinkee Pacquiao, may substitute.

On February 22, 2016, Richard J. Gordon filed a petition to the Supreme Court to reverse a decision by the Comelec from refraining to print receipts from the voting machines. Greco Belgica followed suit.

== Candidates ==
A total of 50 candidates were included in the initial list of candidates to be included in the ballot.

Koalisyon ng Daang Matuwid
#	Name	Party
4.	Ina Ambolodto	Liberal
12.	Leila de Lima	Liberal
15.	Franklin Drilon	Liberal
19.	TG Guingona	Liberal
20.	Risa Hontiveros	Akbayan
25.	Panfilo Lacson	Independent
27.	Mark Lapid	Aksyon
37.	Cresente Paez	Independent
40.	Kiko Pangilinan	Liberal
41.	Jericho Petilla	Liberal
42.	Ralph Recto	Liberal
49.	Joel Villanueva	Liberal

Partido Galing at Puso
#	Name	Party
11.	Neri Colmenares	Makabayan
13.	Isko Moreno	PMP
17.	Sherwin Gatchalian	NPC
18.	Dick Gordon	Independent
22.	Lorna Kapunan	Aksyon
30.	Edu Manzano	Independent
34.	Susan Ople	Nacionalista
38.	Samuel Pagdilao	Independent
42.	Ralph Recto*	Liberal
44.	Roman Romulo	Independent
46.	Tito Sotto	NPC
50.	Juan Miguel Zubiri	Independent

People's Reform Party
#	Name	Party
13.	Isko Moreno*	PMP
30.	Edu Manzano*	Independent
34.	Susan Ople*	Nacionalista
36.	Manny Pacquiao*	UNA
41.	Jericho Petilla*	Liberal
42.	Ralph Recto*	Liberal
43.	Martin Romualdez	Lakas
45.	Dionisio Santiago	Independent
47.	Francis Tolentino	Independent
49.	Joel Villanueva*	Liberal

United Nationalist Alliance
#	Name	Party
18.	Dick Gordon*	Independent
23.	Jacel Kiram	UNA
24.	Alma Moreno	UNA
25.	Panfilo Lacson*	Independent
26.	Rey Langit	UNA
31.	Allan Montaño	UNA
33.	Getulio Napeñas	UNA
34.	Susan Ople*	Nacionalista
36.	Manny Pacquiao	UNA
43.	Martin Romualdez*	Lakas
46.	Tito Sotto*	NPC
50.	Juan Miguel Zubiri*	Independent

*Guest candidates

Partido ng Manggagawa at Magsasaka
#	Name	Party
2.	Aldin Ali	LM
10.	Melchor Chavez	LM

Non-independents not in tickets
#	Name	Party
9.	Sandra Cam	PMP
16.	Larry Gadon	KBL
29.	Romeo Maganto	Lakas

Independents not in tickets
#	Name	Party
1.	Shariff Albani	Independent
3.	Raffy Alunan	Independent
5.	Godofredo Arquiza	Independent
6.	Levito Baligod	Independent
7.	Greco Belgica	Independent
8.	Walden Bello	Independent
14.	Ray Dorona	Independent
21.	Eid Kabalu	Independent
28.	Dante Liban	Independent
32.	Ramon Montaño	Independent
35.	Serge Osmeña	Independent
39.	Jovito Palparan	Independent
48.	Diosdado Valeroso	Independent

== Opinion polling ==
Opinion polling, locally known as surveys in the Philippines, is conducted by Social Weather Stations (SWS), Pulse Asia and other pollsters.

The frontrunner is in bold. Those which are within the margin of error are in italics.

=== Per candidate ===
This list includes all individuals named by at least 10% of respondents in any of the eight conducted surveys. The top 16 candidates with the highest favourability in each poll are listed below, where the top 12 is marked with a "black line". For a comprehensive list of all individuals included in the surveys, and other surveys that have been conducted before 2016, see the main article.

Rank	2016															
Rank	Jan 8–10		Jan 24–28		Feb 5–7		Feb 13		Feb 15–20		Feb 16–27		Feb 24–Mar 1		Mar 30–Apr 2	
Rank	SWS		Pulse		SWS		MBC-DZRH		Pulse		Pulse		Standard		SWS	
1	Sotto	56	Sotto	68.6	Sotto	52	Lacson	53.0	Sotto	63.6	Sotto	50.6	Sotto	50	Drilon	45
2	Lacson	49	Pangilinan	65.6	Lacson	49	Sotto	51.0	Lacson	60.2	Pangilinan	47.2	Pangilinan	43	Sotto	42
3	Pangilinan	46	Lacson	63.3	Recto	46	Zubiri	46.6	Pangilinan	54.1	Drilon	46.5	Recto	43	Pangilinan	37
4	Recto	46	Recto	59.9	Pangilinan	42	Recto	43.4	Recto	53.4	Lacson	44.9	Hontiveros	39	Lacson	37
5	Drilon	43	Drilon	58.8	Drilon	40	Pangilinan	42.2	Drilon	52.4	Recto	43.5	Zubiri	37	de Lima	31
6	Osmeña	42	Zubiri	54.9	Zubiri	38	Drilon	41.2	Zubiri	48.5	Zubiri	39.4	Drilon	36	Pacquiao	31
7	Zubiri	39	Osmeña	54.8	Osmeña	37	de Lima	38.1	de Lima	45.3	Osmeña	36.3	Lacson	36	Zubiri	31
8	Pacquiao	37	de Lima	48.6	de Lima	45	Pacquiao	37.9	Osmeña	43.7	de Lima	35.1	Villanueva	36	Gordon	30
9	de Lima	33	Gordon	48.6	Pacquiao	45	Osmeña	33.6	Gordon	42.6	Gordon	34.9	Gatchalian	32	Hontiveros	30
10	Gordon	31	Pacquiao	46.9	Hontiveros	27	Gordon	33.4	Gatchalian	41.2	Pacquiao	33.2	Romualdez	31	Recto	30
11	Guingona	28	Guingona	41.4	Gordon	26	Hontiveros	31.3	Villanueva	39.1	Hontiveros	33.1	de Lima	30	Osmeña	30
12	Hontiveros	28	Hontiveros	41.1	Guingona	26	Gatchalian	28.3	Guingona	36.7	Villanueva	28.5	Gordon	30	Villanueva	28
13	Moreno	28	Gatchalian	37.7	Gatchalian	23	Villanueva	27.7	Hontiveros	36.2	Guingona	28.2	Pacquiao	30	Gatchalian	25
14	Lapid	19	Villanueva	31.1	Villanueva	22	Guingona	24.2	Pacquiao	34.8	Gatchalian	26.1	Guingona	30	Tolentino	24
15	Tolentino	19	Lapid	27.2	Lapid	19	Manzano	21.8	Tolentino	24.0	Romualdez	20.6	Osmeña	25	Romualdez	22
16	Villanueva	19	Moreno	24.5	Tolentino	19	Lapid	20.6	Romualdez	22.0	Tolentino	20.5	Moreno	25	Guingona	21

== Results ==
The Commission on Elections, sitting as the National Board of Canvassers, convened for the first time on May 11, receiving the first batch of certificates of canvass, totaling 40, from various cities and diplomatic outposts. The camp of Francis Tolentino, the 13th-placed candidate, citing the alteration by Smartmatic to the script at the commission's "Transparency server", objected to the impending proclamation of the winning senators by securing a restraining order at the Supreme Court, but failed. On May 31, the SC has dismissed Tolentino's petition for being "moot and academic".

The commission proclaimed the 12 winning candidates on May 19. The senators elect include three senators-elect who were reelected, four returning senators from previous Congresses, and five neophytes. Seven candidates from Koalisyon ng Daang Matuwid won, four from Partido Galing at Puso, and one from the United Nationalist Alliance.

The three senators who successfully defended their seats were Franklin Drilon, Ralph Recto and Tito Sotto.

There were four senators who returned to the Senate. These were Dick Gordon, Panfilo Lacson, Francis Pangilinan, and Juan Miguel Zubiri.

Five senators entered the chamber for the first time. These were Leila de Lima, Sherwin Gatchalian, Risa Hontiveros, Manny Pacquiao and Joel Villanueva. De Lima won her first election; this was the first election of Villanueva with his name on the ballot instead of his party (him being a nominee of the Citizens' Battle Against Corruption in party-list elections); this was the first senatorial election for both Gatchalian and Pacquiao; and this was the third attempt of Hontiveros.

Incumbents Serge Osmeña and TG Guingona did not successfully defend their seats.

Composition of the Senate before and after the election:

		1	2	3	4	5	6	7	8	9	10	11	12	13	14	15	16	17	18	19	20	21	22	23	24
Before election	Senate bloc	Majority bloc																		Minority bloc					
Before election	Party								‡	‡	‡	‡	‡	‡	‡	‡	‡	‡	‡	‡					
Election result		Not up									UNA	PGP				KDM							Not up		
After election	Party										+	√	+	*	+	+	√	√	*	+	+	+			
After election	Senate bloc	Majority bloc																				Minority bloc			

Key:

- ‡ Seats up
- + Gained by a party from another party
- √ Held by the incumbent
- * Held by the same party with a new senator

Notes:

- Alan Peter Cayetano, Bongbong Marcos and Antonio Trillanes, who all ran for the vice presidency as independents, are shown as members of the Nacionalista Party both before and after the election.
- Manny Pacquiao ran under the United Nationalist Alliance during the election, but switched to PDP–Laban before the 17th Congress convened. He is shown here as a member of the PDP–Laban in the results tables, except for the "Per candidate" table, and on the "Per party" table's "Wins" column, where he is shown as an UNA member. In all other tables, including the "Per party" table's "Start" column, he is a PDP–Laban member.

=== Per candidate ===
A map showing the results by illustrating the topnotcher candidate by province.

Candidate	Party or alliance		Votes	%
Franklin Drilon	Koalisyon ng Daang Matuwid	Liberal Party	18,607,391	41.37
Joel Villanueva	Koalisyon ng Daang Matuwid (Note: Guest candidate of People's Reform Party)	Liberal Party	18,459,222	41.04
Tito Sotto	Partido Galing at Puso (Note: Guest candidate of United Nationalist Alliance)	Nationalist People's Coalition	17,200,371	38.24
Panfilo Lacson	Koalisyon ng Daang Matuwid	Independent	16,926,152	37.63
Dick Gordon	Partido Galing at Puso	Independent	16,719,322	37.17
Juan Miguel Zubiri	Partido Galing at Puso	Independent	16,119,165	35.84
Manny Pacquiao	United Nationalist Alliance		16,050,546	35.68
Kiko Pangilinan	Koalisyon ng Daang Matuwid	Liberal Party	15,955,949	35.47
Risa Hontiveros	Koalisyon ng Daang Matuwid	Akbayan	15,915,213	35.38
Sherwin Gatchalian	Partido Galing at Puso	Nationalist People's Coalition	14,953,768	33.25
Ralph Recto	Koalisyon ng Daang Matuwid (Note: Guest candidate of Partido Galing at Puso)	Liberal Party	14,271,868	31.73
Leila de Lima	Koalisyon ng Daang Matuwid	Liberal Party	14,144,070	31.45
Francis Tolentino	People's Reform Party	Independent	12,811,098	28.48
Serge Osmeña	Independent		12,670,615	28.17
Martin Romualdez	People's Reform Party	Lakas–CMD	12,325,824	27.40
Isko Moreno	Partido Galing at Puso	Pwersa ng Masang Pilipino	11,126,944	24.74
TG Guingona	Koalisyon ng Daang Matuwid	Liberal Party	10,331,157	22.97
Jericho Petilla	Koalisyon ng Daang Matuwid	Liberal Party	7,046,580	15.67
Mark Lapid	Koalisyon ng Daang Matuwid	Aksyon Demokratiko	6,594,190	14.66
Neri Colmenares	Partido Galing at Puso	Makabayan	6,484,985	14.42
Edu Manzano	Partido Galing at Puso	Independent	5,269,539	11.72
Roman Romulo	Partido Galing at Puso	Independent	4,824,484	10.73
Susan Ople	Partido Galing at Puso	Nacionalista Party	2,775,191	6.17
Alma Moreno	United Nationalist Alliance		2,432,224	5.41
Greco Belgica	Independent		2,100,985	4.67
Rafael Alunan III	Independent		2,032,362	4.52
Larry Gadon	Kilusang Bagong Lipunan		1,971,327	4.38
Rey Langit	United Nationalist Alliance		1,857,630	4.13
Lorna Kapunan	Partido Galing at Puso	Aksyon Demokratiko	1,838,978	4.09
Dionisio Santiago	People's Reform Party	Independent	1,828,305	4.06
Samuel Pagdilao	Partido Galing at Puso	Independent	1,755,949	3.90
Melchor Chavez	Partido ng Manggagawa at Magsasaka		1,736,822	3.86
Getulio Napeñas	United Nationalist Alliance		1,719,576	3.82
Ina Ambolodto	Koalisyon ng Daang Matuwid	Liberal Party	1,696,558	3.77
Allan Montaño	United Nationalist Alliance		1,605,073	3.57
Walden Bello	Independent		1,091,194	2.43
Jacel Kiram	United Nationalist Alliance		995,673	2.21
Shariff Ibrahim Albani	Independent		905,610	2.01
Jovito Palparan	Independent		855,297	1.90
Cresente Paez	Koalisyon ng Daang Matuwid	Independent	808,623	1.80
Sandra Cam	Pwersa ng Masang Pilipino		805,756	1.79
Dante Liban	Independent		782,249	1.74
Ramon Montaño	Independent		759,263	1.69
Aldin Ali	Partido ng Manggagawa at Magsasaka		733,838	1.63
Romeo Maganto	Lakas–CMD		731,021	1.63
Godofredo Arquiza	Independent		680,550	1.51
Levito Baligod	Independent		596,583	1.33
Diosdado Valeroso	Independent		527,146	1.17
Ray Dorona	Independent		495,191	1.10
Eid Kabalu	Independent		379,846	0.84
Total			321,307,273	100.00
Total votes			44,979,151	–
Registered voters/turnout			55,739,911	80.69
Source: COMELEC

==== Vote share by province ====
Franklin Drilon

Joel Villanueva

Tito Sotto

Panfilo Lacson

Dick Gordon

Manny Pacquiao

Migz Zubiri

Kiko Pangilinan

Risa Hontiveros

Sherwin Gatchalian

Ralph Recto

Leila de Lima

=== Per coalition ===
- The seats won totals does not account for guest candidates.

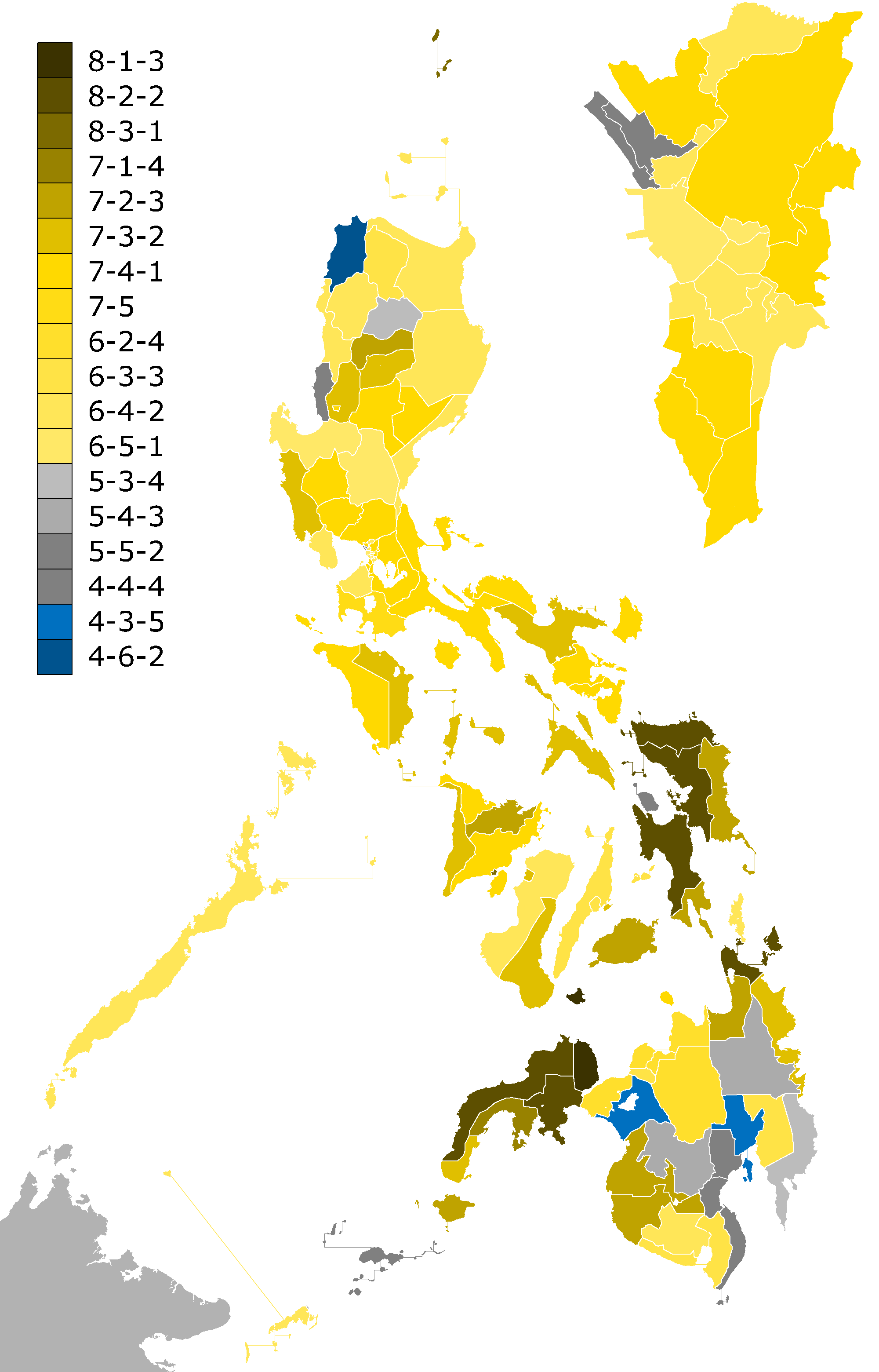
Full results of the election per province/city. Results are determined via nationwide vote, the map represents if the results were determined per province/city, ordered by Koalisyon ng Daang Matuwid, Partido Galing at Puso, then other parties and coalitions.

Party or alliance		Votes	%	Seats
Koalisyon ng Daang Matuwid	Liberal Party	100,512,795	31.28	5
Koalisyon ng Daang Matuwid	Akbayan	15,915,213	4.95	1
Koalisyon ng Daang Matuwid	Aksyon Demokratiko	6,594,190	2.05	0
Koalisyon ng Daang Matuwid	Independent	17,734,775	5.52	1
Koalisyon ng Daang Matuwid	Total	140,756,973	43.81	7
Partido Galing at Puso	Nationalist People's Coalition	32,154,139	10.01	2
Partido Galing at Puso	Pwersa ng Masang Pilipino	11,126,944	3.46	0
Partido Galing at Puso	Makabayan	6,484,985	2.02	0
Partido Galing at Puso	Nacionalista Party	2,775,191	0.86	0
Partido Galing at Puso	Aksyon Demokratiko	1,838,978	0.57	0
Partido Galing at Puso	Independent	44,688,459	13.91	2
Partido Galing at Puso	Total	99,068,696	30.83	4
United Nationalist Alliance		24,660,722	7.68	1
People's Reform Party	Lakas–CMD	12,325,824	3.84	0
People's Reform Party	Independent	1,828,305	0.57	0
People's Reform Party	Total	14,154,129	4.41	0
Partido ng Manggagawa at Magsasaka		2,470,660	0.77	0
Kilusang Bagong Lipunan		1,971,327	0.61	0
Pwersa ng Masang Pilipino		805,756	0.25	0
Lakas–CMD		731,021	0.23	0
Independent		36,687,989	11.42	0
Total		321,307,273	100.00	12
Total votes		44,979,151	–	
Registered voters/turnout		55,739,911	80.69	

Vote share
KDM	43.81%
PGP	30.83%
UNA	7.68%
Others	17.68%

Senate seats
KDM	58.33%
PGP	33.33%
UNA	8.33%
Others	0.00%

=== Per party ===
Manny Pacquiao won the election as a candidate of United Nationalist Alliance (UNA), but later joined the PDP–Laban before the start of the 17th Congress. Pacquiao is treated as an UNA candidate in this table, except in the "After" column" where he is included in PDP–Laban's totals.

Party	Votes	%	+/–	Seats				
Party	Votes	%	+/–	Up	Before	Won	After	+/−
Liberal Party	100,512,795	31.28	+19.94	3	4	5	6	+2
Nationalist People's Coalition	32,154,139	10.01	−0.15	1	2	2	3	+1
United Nationalist Alliance	24,660,722	7.68	−19.29	1	3	1	2	−1
Akbayan	15,915,213	4.95	+1.26	0	0	1	1	New
Lakas–CMD	13,056,845	4.06	New	2	2	0	0	−2
Pwersa ng Masang Pilipino	11,932,700	3.71	New	1	2	0	1	−1
Aksyon Demokratiko	8,433,168	2.62	New	0	0	0	0	0
Makabayan	6,484,985	2.02	+0.58	0	0	0	0	0
Nacionalista Party	2,775,191	0.86	−14.44	2	5	0	3	−2
Partido ng Manggagawa at Magsasaka	2,470,660	0.77	+0.16	0	0	0	0	0
Kilusang Bagong Lipunan	1,971,327	0.61	New	0	0	0	0	0
Independent	100,939,528	31.42	+8.16	1	3	3	5	+2
Laban ng Demokratikong Pilipino				0	1	0	1	0
PDP–Laban				0	1	0	2	+1
People's Reform Party				1	1	0	0	−1
Total	321,307,273	100.00	–	12	24	12	24	0
Total votes	44,979,151	–						
Registered voters/turnout	55,739,911	80.69						

Vote share
Liberal	31.30%
NPC	10.07%
UNA	7.64%
Akbayan	4.97%
Independent	31.36%
Others	14.66%

Senate seats
Liberal	41.67%
NPC	16.67%
UNA	8.33%
Akbayan	8.33%
Independent	12.50%
Others	0.00%

== Defeated incumbents ==
- Serge Osmeña (independent), ran in 2019 and lost
- TG Guingona (Liberal/KDM)

== Election for the Senate President ==
On July 25, the day of convening of the 17th Congress, Tito Sotto and Migz Zubiri nominated Koko Pimentel for the Senate presidency, while Francis Escudero and Antonio Trillanes nominated Ralph Recto. Pimentel won by a vote of 20-3 with the backing of the largest party in the chamber, the Liberal Party, which included Recto as part of the tradition of opposing candidates voting for one other. Alan Peter Cayetano, who has expressed interest in leading the Senate, was absent during the session. Recto automatically became the Minority Leader after losing to Pimentel. Franklin Drilon was elected Senate President pro tempore while Sotto was elected Majority Leader.

Candidate	# of Votes	Voter	Party
Koko Pimentel	20	Bam Aquino	Liberal (6)
Koko Pimentel	20	Leila de Lima	Liberal (6)
Koko Pimentel	20	Franklin Drilon	Liberal (6)
Koko Pimentel	20	Francis Pangilinan	Liberal (6)
Koko Pimentel	20	Ralph Recto	Liberal (6)
Koko Pimentel	20	Joel Villanueva	Liberal (6)
Koko Pimentel	20	Sherwin Gatchalian	NPC (3)
Koko Pimentel	20	Loren Legarda	NPC (3)
Koko Pimentel	20	Tito Sotto	NPC (3)
Koko Pimentel	20	Nancy Binay	UNA (2)
Koko Pimentel	20	Gregorio Honasan	UNA (2)
Koko Pimentel	20	Risa Hontiveros	Akbayan (1)
Koko Pimentel	20	Sonny Angara	LDP (1)
Koko Pimentel	20	Cynthia Villar	Nacionalista (1)
Koko Pimentel	20	Manny Pacquiao	PDP–Laban (1)
Koko Pimentel	20	JV Ejercito	PMP (1)
Koko Pimentel	20	Dick Gordon	Independent (4)
Koko Pimentel	20	Panfilo Lacson	Independent (4)
Koko Pimentel	20	Grace Poe	Independent (4)
Koko Pimentel	20	Migz Zubiri	Independent (4)
Ralph Recto	3	Antonio Trillanes	Nacionalista (1)
Ralph Recto	3	Koko Pimentel	PDP–Laban (1)
Ralph Recto	3	Francis Escudero	Independent (1)
Absent	1	Alan Peter Cayetano	Nacionalista (1)
