= List of senators elected in the 2013 Philippine Senate election =

The 2013 Senate election in the Philippines occurred on May 13, 2013 to elect one-half of the Senate. The senators elected in 2013, together with those elected in 2010, comprise the Senate's delegation in the 16th Congress.

The proclamation of all the 12 senators was done three days after Election Day, on May 16. all incumbents that ran successfully defended their seats, while all new senators were elected.

== Manner of Election ==
Voting for senators is via nationwide, at-large basis via the plurality-at-large voting system. A voter has twelve votes: the voter can vote less than twelve but not more than it. These votes are tallied nationwide and the twelve candidates with the highest number of votes are elected to the Senate. The Commission on Elections administers elections for the Senate, with the Senate Electoral Tribunal deciding election disputes after a Senator has taken office.

== Senators elected in 2013 ==
- Key: Boldface: incumbent, italicized: neophyte senator

Rank	Image	Senator	Party	Coalition	Voted at*	Date proclaimed	Religion	Prior congressional and elective executive positions	Born
1st		Grace Poe	Independent	Team PNoy	San Juan	May 16, 2013	Roman Catholic		1968
2nd		**Loren Legarda**	NPC	Team PNoy	Malabon	May 16, 2013	Roman Catholic	Senator (1998–2004, 2007–2013)	1960
3rd		**Alan Peter Cayetano**	Nacionalista	Team PNoy	Taguig	May 16, 2013	Evangelical Charismatic Christian	Senator (2007–2013); Member of the Philippine House of Representatives from Lone District of Taguig-Pateros (1998–2007); Acting Vice Mayor of Taguig (1998–1998); Member of the Taguig Municipal Council from the 1st district (1992–1998)	1970
4th		**Francis Escudero**	Independent	Team PNoy	Sorsogon City	May 16, 2013	Roman Catholic	Senator (2007–2013); Member of the Philippine House of Representatives from Sorsogon's First District (1998–2007)	1969
5th		Nancy Binay	UNA	UNA	Makati	May 16, 2013	Roman Catholic		1973
6th		Sonny Angara	LDP	Team PNoy	Baler	May 16, 2013	Roman Catholic	Member of the Philippine House of Representatives from Aurora's Lone District (2004–2013)	1972
7th		Bam Aquino	Liberal	Team PNoy	Quezon City	May 17, 2013	Roman Catholic		1977
8th		**Koko Pimentel**	PDP–Laban	Team PNoy	Cagayan de Oro	May 17, 2013	Roman Catholic	Senator (2007–2013)	1964
9th		**Antonio Trillanes**	Nacionalista	Team PNoy	Caloocan	May 17, 2013	Roman Catholic	Senator (2007–2013)	1971
10th		Cynthia Villar	Nacionalista	Team PNoy	Las Piñas	May 18, 2013	Roman Catholic	Member of the Philippine House of Representatives from Las Piñas' Lone District (2001–2010)	1950
11th		JV Ejercito	UNA	UNA	San Juan	May 18, 2013	Roman Catholic	Member of the Philippine House of Representatives from San Juan City; Mayor of San Juan City (2001–2010)	1969
12th		**Gregorio Honasan**	UNA	UNA	Marikina	May 18, 2013	Roman Catholic	Senator (1995–2004, 2007–2013)	1948

*Senators are elected on a nationwide, at-large basis.
