= Carlos Isagani Zarate =

Filipino politician, lawyer, and activist

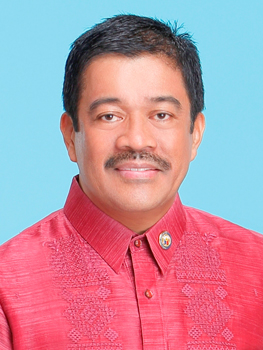

Member of the Philippine House of Representatives for Bayan Muna party-list
- In office June 30, 2013 – June 30, 2022 Serving with Ferdinand Gaite and Eufemia Cullamat (2019–2022); Neri Colmenares (2013–2016)

Personal details
- Born: May 14, 1967 (age 59) General Santos, Philippines
- Party: Bayan Muna
- Spouse: Rogieliza Verallo
- Education: Notre Dame of Dadiangas University; Ateneo de Davao University (L.L.B.)
- Profession: Politician, Human Rights Lawyer

Carlos Isagani "Kaloi" Tabora Zarate (born May 14, 1967) is a Filipino politician, lawyer, and activist who served as a Party-list Representative for Bayan Muna from 2013 to 2022. He was also the deputy minority leader in the 18th Congress.

On July 10, 2020, he was one of the 11 representatives who voted to grant the franchise renewal of ABS-CBN and he is the only partylist representative and one of the three Mindanaoans who voted to grant the franchise.

== Early life and education ==
Zarate was born on May 14, 1967 in General Santos. He earned a bachelor's degree in Commerce with a major in Accountancy at the Notre Dame of Dadiangas University and later a law degree at the Ateneo de Davao University.

== Legal career ==
Upon admission to the Philippine Bar in 1995, Zarate engaged in a small legal practice focused on human rights law, serving a wide clientele including laborers, small farmers, Indigenous peoples, such as the Lumad, and Moro people, urban poor, and political prisoners. Zarate also served on various capacities on different professional associations for lawyers: As coordinator for the Free Legal Assistance Group (FLAG) in Davao City, as Secretary-General of the Union of People's Lawyers in Mindanao and Vice-President for Mindanao of the National Union of People's Lawyers (NUPL). He also once served as the President of the Davao City chapter of the Integrated Bar.
