= Levito Baligod =

Filipino lawyer (born 1969)

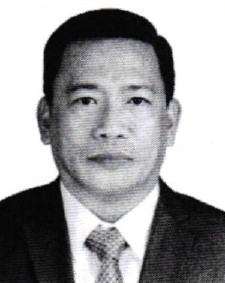
- Baligod certificate of candidacy photo in 2024
- Born: Levito Doniego Baligod; November 2, 1969 (age 57); Santa Ana, Cagayan, Philippines
- Education: University of the Philippines Diliman (BA); San Beda College; University of the East (LLB)
- Occupations: Lawyer, businessman
- Political party: Independent (2015–2018; 2024–present); NPC (2018–2024)

Levito "Levi" Doniego Baligod (born November 2, 1969) is a Filipino lawyer and businessman. He is best known for serving as the counsel of Benhur Luy, a whistleblower in the 2013 pork barrel scam, and counsel to politician Mike Defensor and 18 individuals who gained controversy over their claims of sending suitcases of kickbacks from flood control projects to several politicians and activists.

Baligod ran for senator in 2016, for mayor of Baybay City in 2019, and for representative of Leyte's fifth district in 2025 as an independent candidate on an anti-corruption platform, but lost in all three elections.

== Early life and education ==
Levito Baligod was born on November 2, 1969 in Santa Ana, Cagayan. He graduated from elementary and high school at the Tuao Central Elementary School and the Lyceum of Tuao respectively, both in the town of Tuao, Cagayan.

Baligod graduated with a bachelor of arts degree in both economics and political science at the University of the Philippines Diliman in 1991, and served as a member of the UP Vanguard. He attended the San Beda College of Law before transferring to the University of the East College of Law from which he acquired his bachelor of laws degree by 1999. Baligod passed the Philippine Bar Examination in 1999.

== Career ==
=== 1992–2012 ===
Baligod served as political affairs officer of a congressman at the House of Representatives from 1992 to 2004.

In 2005, Baligod established the Villanueva & Baligod Law Offices in Makati alongside fellow UP Vanguard member Raul Villanueva. As lawyers, Baligod largely handled criminal cases while Villanueva handled corporate and civil cases.

In January 2006, Baligod partnered with Tito Delos Angeles and other inexperienced restaurateurs in opening the Japanese-themed restaurant Murasaki at The Wharf along Brittany Bay in Muntinlupa, Metro Manila.

In 2007, Baligod served as the lawyer of Cagayan Governor Edgar Lara, a reelectionist, and outgoing Tuguegarao Mayor Randolph Ting during the 2007 general election, in which Baligod shouted accusations of bias to the provincial board of canvassers in Cagayan in ignoring his request for a recount in his hometown of Tuao. Chairman Michael Valdez and two members of the board resigned out of protest to his accusations, with Valdez stating that they "could no longer bear the insult and false accusations" of Baligod.

In September 2009, Baligod filed a complaint to the University Athletic Association of the Philippines (UAAP) Board regarding the potential ineligibility of former Ateneo basketball player Jobe Nkemakolam to enter the Ateneo de Manila University after lacking units to complete high school; his complaint was dismissed by the board a day later.

=== 2012–2017 ===
In early 2013, Baligod began serving as Benhur Luy's private counsel when the latter was kidnapped by businesswoman Janet Lim-Napoles during the pork barrel scam, with Baligod's UP Vanguard batchmate, a military officer, having reached out to him for assistance in December 2012 at the request of Luy's mother and sister. By March 2013, Baligod wrote a letter to Justice Secretary Leila de Lima, informing her about the situation of Luy, which led to his March 22 rescue at the Pacific Plaza Towers in Taguig by the National Bureau of Investigation. Baligod was eventually relieved as Luy's lawyer by March 3, 2014 due to his busy schedule and resulting lack of time for Luy, while his other client in the pork barrel scam case, Merlina Suñas, relieved him as well by May 23; both expressed gratitude to Baligod's service in their letters for his relief. In 2026, Baligod falsely claimed to have resigned as Luy and Suñas's lawyer due to selective prosecution of the scam's perpetrators by the Aquino administration.

On September 2, 2015, Baligod filed a complaint before the Office of the Ombudsman charging Liberal North Cotabato Representative Nancy Catamco and 14 others with malversation for allegedly operating fake non-governmental organizations during the pork barrel scam.

In 2016, Baligod ran for senator as an independent on a platform of anti-corruption and agricultural modernization, forming a coalition of independents with Senator Panfilo Lacson and former Akbayan representative Walden Bello. During the campaign, he accused the Aquino administration through the Department of Justice of being selective in its prosecution of politicians by shielding allies involved in the pork barrel scam, and began claiming that he had quit as Luy's lawyer in 2014 due to this reason. On election day, May 9, he accused local Liberal Party candidates in Baybay City of engaging in "systematic vote buying" during his wife Malot's mayoral run in the city under the United Nationalist Alliance of Vice President Jejomar Binay. Baligod eventually lost the election after placing 47th among senatorial candidates nationwide.

=== 2017–2025 ===
In 2019, Baligod ran for mayor of Baybay City, citing the city's alleged illegal drug problem and impoverished population; during the campaign, he expressed support for President Rodrigo Duterte's anti-drug campaign. Baligod was eventually defeated by Congressman Jose Carlos. In August 2019, the Baligod couple established the restaurant Cali's Roast & Grill House in Baybay, and a year later established the cosmetics company GloWish Cosmetics Manufacturing.

In March 2023, Baligod began representing the Degamo family in the murder case against Representative Arnie Teves, accusing him of perpetrating the assassination of Negros Oriental Governor Roel Degamo on March 4, 2023, as well as eight other murders in the province in 2019.

In 2025, Baligod ran for representative of Leyte's fifth district as an independent, citing the district's impoverished population and alleged illegal drug problem as issues to be solved and criticizing the ayuda ("aid") programs as the "worst form of government program". During his campaign, Baligod decided against acquiring celebrity endorsements, stating that "I have no resources, I will run based on my credentials." He was eventually defeated by incumbent Lakas–CMD congressman Carl Cari, who won with more than 150,000 votes compared to Baligod's 48,806. Baligod's wife Malot was previously defeated by Cari for the same congressional position in the 2019 election.

=== 2025–present ===
In November 2025, Baligod began serving as the counsel of politician Mike Defensor and 18 individuals, who were former security personnel for Congressman Zaldy Co, in their accusations of corruption against numerous government officials, alleging that the 18 served as bagmen in the delivery of ₱805 billion worth of kickbacks from flood control projects in luggages ("maleta") to several politicians and activists not aligned with the Duterte family. Their initial press conference in San Juan, Metro Manila on February 24, 2026 coincided with the confirmation of charges hearing of former President Rodrigo Duterte at the International Criminal Court. By the morning of February 26, Baligod submitted the 18 individuals' affidavit to the Office of the Ombudsman, but later admitted in the afternoon to mistakenly including partylist representative Leila de Lima among the list of alleged recipients of the luggages. Defensor also denied having contributed to the affidavit by claiming he had only met the 18 individuals during the time of the press conference.

Name	Comments
Romeo Rommel O. Bobares	Former Navy member
Johnny A. Buduan	Dishonorably discharged Contact person for the 18 individuals
Benny S. Bulontate	
Joely G. Cadiao	
Fidel M. Corpuz	
Crisanie L. Dado	Alleged driver of Orly Guteza
Christopher T. Esquivel	Driving instructor for TESDA
Rommel C. Galapon	
Bernard A. Gumban	
Reyneboy O. Julian	
Cecilio S. Larroder Jr.	
Walter M. Manalansan	
Gil N. Navidad Jr.	
Rodante P. Orbillo	
Anselmo Taberdo	
Belnard E. Tube	
George O. Villalon Jr.	Former Navy member
Rosebert M. Waupan	

Sixteen of the eighteen individuals initially claimed to have been former members of the Philippine Marine Corps, with the remaining two, Rommel Galapon and Reyneboy Julian, respectively claiming to be a former enlisted member and a current reservist of the Philippine Army. After Baligod's February 24 press conference, the Philippine Navy issued a statement refuting their claims, noting that four of those claiming to be former marines had never been members of the Marine Corps., while most of the others were dishonorably discharged. Baligod countered that only one was dishonorably discharged: Johnny Buduan, who was found guilty in a military hearing due to a food delivery instructed by his commanding officer while serving a Philippine UN contingent overseas. Senator Panfilo Lacson later stated that according to the Philippine Armed Forces, those dishonorably discharged numbered up to 10, with most of them relieved due to going absent without leave (AWOL). Based on an initial investigation by the National Bureau of Investigation under Melvin Matibag, the 18 individuals were among the 103 previously recruited by a retired army general to be Zaldy Co's security personnel, with only ten of the individuals working directly for Co while the other eight were employed in shifts by Co's media relations officer. Matibag later stated that it was Baligod who first approached Johnny Buduan in contacting other security personnel under Co to testify regarding alleged flood control kickbacks in November 2025.

On June 8, 2026, Baligod held an unprecedented press conference with the 18 individuals at the Senate office of Robin Padilla, simultaneous to a Blue Ribbon Committee consultative meeting wherein the 18 have already been invited to be resource persons; only senators are allowed to hold press conferences at the Senate.

On July 8, 2026, Senator Erwin Tulfo filed grave oral defamation complaints with the Mandaluyong City Prosecutor's Office against Baligod, his two clients who were once Zaldy Co's bodyguards, former Anakalusugan Representative Mike Defensor, Quezon City Councilor Ranulfo Ludovica, and lawyer Virgilio Garcia. The complaints stemmed from a June 16, 2026 event at the Doublegem EDSA Garden Events Place in Mandaluyong, which was originally billed as a Senate Blue Ribbon Committee hearing by the bloc of then-disputed Senate President Alan Peter Cayetano but was cancelled as no senators attended the event. The event proceeded as a press conference that Tulfo alleged was unauthorized and spearheaded by Defensor and Baligod, during which the two ex-bodyguards accused him of receiving cash kickbacks from an alleged flood control scam. Serving as the committee's chairperson under a rival Senate faction, Tulfo denied the accusations, citing a lack of jurisdiction over infrastructure projects.

On October 16, 2026, Baligod and fourteen of the eighteen individuals were arrested for an unjust vexation case under Republic Act 10175, also known as the Cybercrime Prevention Act of 2012, in San Juan City.

== Personal life ==
Baligod has four children from his marriage to Marilyn Anne Navarro, who died of breast cancer on February 11, 2013. He later met Leyte-based politician Marilou "Malot" Veloso-Galenzoga at her sister Dayday Dieza's house in Quezon City sometime during the 2013 election season, with the two becoming close after November 2013. They became engaged by late February 2014, and were married at the San Antonio de Padua Church in Silang, Cavite on May 28, 2014, with Vice President Jejomar Binay as godfather and congressman Martin Romualdez and former chief justice Reynato Puno as two of the wedding's principal sponsors. Baligod later moved to Baybay City, his wife's hometown in Leyte, in late 2017.

Baligod is a fan of the loveteam of actors Richard Gomez and Dawn Zulueta, citing the former as his preferred actor to play himself in a hypothetical biographical film ("well, Richard is just as dark as I am, ha, ha, but he is more handsome").
