= Lorna Kapunan =

Filipino lawyer and politician (born 1952)

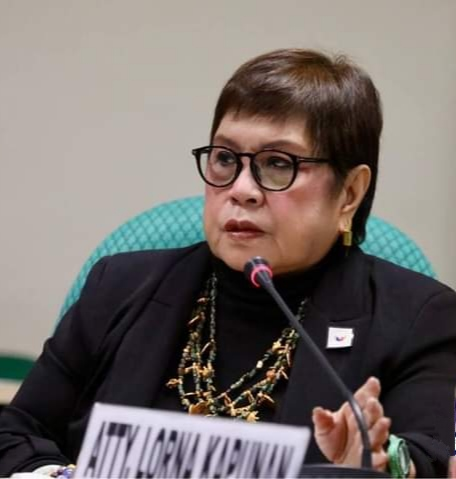
- Kapunan at Senate hearing, 2024

Leader of the Aksyon Demokratiko
- In office 2016

Secretary General of the Aksyon Demokratiko
- In office 2009–2010
- Preceded by: Jay Sonza
- Succeeded by: Herminio Aquino

Personal details
- Born: Lorna Taaca Patajo; April 1, 1952 (age 74)
- Party: Aksyon Demokratiko
- Spouse: Eduardo Roden E. Kapunan (until death)
- Education: University of the Philippines Diliman (BA, LLB)
- Occupation: Lawyer, politician
- Awards: Outstanding Women in the Nation's Service (TOWNS) awardee
- Website: https://kapunanlaw.com

Lorna Taaca Patajo-Kapunan (born April 1, 1952) is a Filipina lawyer, radio host, and columnist.

== Personal life ==
Kapunan is the daughter of retired Supreme Court Justice Lino M. Patajo and Cristeta Taaca Patajo.

== Education ==
Kapunan studied political science at the University of the Philippines Diliman, and later joined its law school.

She also had seminar courses in Japan Institute of Invention and Innovation (JIII) Tokyo (1997); National Institute of Humanitarian Law, San Remo Italy (September 2005); Summer Course International Humanitarian Law, Magdalene College, Cambridge University, London UK (July 2010).

== Legal career ==
Kapunan worked as a lawyer for ACCRA in 1986.

Senior Partner of the Kapunan Lotilla Garcia & Castillo Law Offices from 2009 until 2011.

She founded in 2011 the Kapunan Garcia & Castillo Law Offices. That time, she was already known as an expert for litigation on licensing law, franchising, corporate and commercial law, joint ventures, mergers and acquisitions, international humanitarian law, family law, estate law and succession and entertainment law.

In 2016, she was named by Filipina Women's Network as one of the 100 most influential Filipino women.

Some of Kapunan's notable clients include businessman and gaming tycoon Atong Ang, basketball player James Yap, doctor Hayden Kho, actress Rhian Ramos, and Janet Lim-Napoles, the alleged mastermind of the Priority Development Assistance Fund scam.

== Issue on marital sex consent ==
In August 15, 2024, in a Senate hearing, Senator Robin Padilla asked Kapunan, what husbands should do if they are "in the mood" and their wives are not. Some of his remarks, such as husbands having 'sexual rights' over their wives, earned widespread backlash. Following this, Padilla apologized, describing his remarks as "hypothetical".

== Commentary and columns ==
She is a weekly columnist of Business Mirror (Legally Speaking) and has a weekly advocacy radio program at DWIZ "Laban Para Sa Karapatan" (Fight For Your Rights).

Writing in BusinessMirror about an issue on the existence of the national motto Maka-Diyos, Maka-tao, Makakalikasan at Makabansa, she expressed surprise at the existence of a national motto because she had not seen it in use anywhere. She continues on to write that the government should mandate that it be displayed prominently in government offices as a reminder of officials' civic duty.

== Political career ==
In 1998 and 2004 presidential elections, Kapunan worked with her law partner Senator Raul Roco's campaign.

In 2016, Kapunan was picked by Grace Poe's Partido Galing at Puso, and ran under Aksyon Demokratiko, for a senate seat, but lost.
