= Partido Galing at Puso =

Defunct political alliance for Grace Poe's presidential campaign

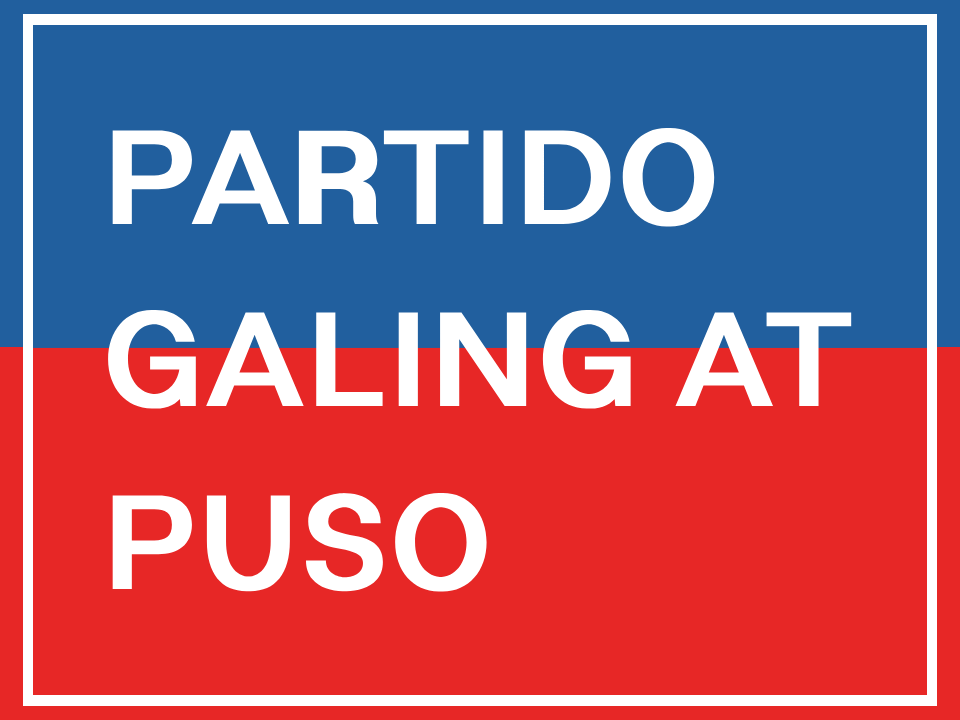
- Leader: Grace Poe
- Deputy leader: Chiz Escudero
- Senate leader: Tito Sotto
- Campaign manager: Ace Durano
- Founded: November 3, 2015
- Dissolved: May 9, 2016
- Coalition members: Ako Bicol; Aksyon; An Waray; Makabayan; NPC
- Colors: Blue
- Slogan: Gobyernong May Puso (lit. Government with a Heart)

The Partido Galing at Puso coalition (abbr. PGP; formerly Partido Pilipinas, and Team Galing at Puso), was the political multi-party electoral alliance of the political parties and coalition opposition in the Philippines during the 2016 general elections aims to support former MTRCB Chairperson and Senator Grace Poe's presidential campaign. The coalition was composed of the Aksyon Demokratiko, Ako Bicol, An Waray, Makabayan and Nationalist People's Coalition (NPC).

== History ==
=== Formation as Partido Pilipinas ===
After the official declaration of Poe's presidential bid at University of the Philippines, Diliman, Quezon City on September 16, 2015, Partido Pilipinas was formed composed of composed of Bagong Alyansang Makabayan and is led by the Nationalist People's Coalition (NPC).

=== Slate as PGP ===
On November 3, 2015, it was announced the personalities of their Senatorial lineup: OFW rights advocate Susan Ople, former Senators Dick Gordon and Migz Zubiri, Valenzuela Congressman Win Gatchalian, Senator Tito Sotto, family lawyer Lorna Kapunan, Pasig Congressman and education advocate Roman Romulo, Bayan Muna Congressman and activist Neri Colmenares, Actor and former Makati Vice Mayor Edu Manzano, former CIDG head Samuel Pagdilao, Manila Vice Mayor Isko Moreno, and Senator Ralph Recto. Senator Panfilo Lacson is originally in the slate as guest candidate, but replaced by Manzano. The ticket is officially dubbed as Partido Galing at Puso, with Cebuano Congressman and NPC stalwart Ace Durano, who was Chiz Escudero's friend as its campaign manager and spokesperson. NPC formally endorsed the tandem by February 2016.

== Election results ==
=== Presidential and vice presidential elections ===
Year	Presidential election			Vice presidential election		
Year	Candidate	Vote share	Result	Candidate	Vote share	Result
2016	Grace Poe	21.39%	Rodrigo Duterte (PDP–Laban)	Chiz Escudero	12.01%	Leni Robredo (Liberal)

=== Senatorial race ===
Name	Party	Occupation	Elected
Neri Colmenares	Makabayan	Former representative from Bayan Muna	No
Isko Moreno Domagoso	PMP	Actor and Manila Vice Mayor	No
Win Gatchalian	NPC	Valenzuela City representative and former mayor	Yes
Dick Gordon	Independent	Philippine Red Cross chairman and former senator	Yes
Lorna Kapunan	Aksyon	Lawyer	No
Edu Manzano	Independent	Actor, former Vice Mayor of Makati, former Chairman of Optical Media Board and former 2010 vice presidential candidate	No
Susan Ople	Nacionalista	OFW rights advocate and Senatorial Candidate 2010 and 2016	No
Samuel Pagdilao	Independent	former PNP Criminal Investigation and Detection Group director and ACT-CIS Representative	No
Ralph Recto	Liberal	Incumbent Senator of the Philippines (2010–present, 2001–2007) former Director-General of the National Economic and Development Authority (2008–2009), former Batangas' 4th district Representative (1992–2001)	Yes
Roman Romulo	Independent	Pasig Representative	No
Tito Sotto	NPC	Acting Senate Minority Floor Leader and Eat Bulaga! host	Yes
Juan Miguel Zubiri	Independent	former senator and former Bukidnon representative	Yes

== Results ==
5 out of the 12 candidates under the Partido Galing at Puso won a seat in the Senate.

Rank	Candidate	Votes	%
3	Tito Sotto	17,200,371	38.24%
5	Richard Gordon	16,719,322	37.28%
6	Juan Miguel Zubiri	16,119,165	35.87%
10	Win Gatchalian	14,953,768	33.58%
11	Ralph Recto	14,271,868	31.79%
16	Isko Moreno Domagoso	11,126,944	24.95%
20	Neri Colmenares	6,484,985	14.48%
21	Edu Manzano	5,269,539	11.69%
22	Roman Romulo	4,824,484	10.79%
23	Susan Ople	2,775,191	6.07%
29	Lorna Kapunan	1,838,978	4.03%
31	Samuel Pagdilao	1,755,949	3.91%

== See also ==
- Koalisyon ng Nagkakaisang Pilipino
