= Samuel Pagdilao =

Filipino retired policeman and former legislator

The Honourable, Director Samuel D. Pagdilao, Jr.
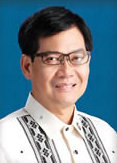
- Official portrait, 2013

Member of the Philippine House of Representatives for ACT-CIS
- In office June 30, 2013 – June 30, 2016

Chief of the PNP Criminal Investigation and Detection Group
- In office April 8, 2011 – February 8, 2013

Personal details
- Born: Samuel Duldulao Pagdilao, Jr. February 13, 1957 (age 69) Cotabato City, Philippines
- Party: Independent (2015–present)
- Other political affiliations: ACT-CIS (2012–2016)
- Spouse: Ma. Rosella Paño
- Children: 5
- Education: Philippine Military Academy (BS); University of Santo Tomas (LL.B); Manuel L. Quezon University (MPA)
- Occupation: Politician
- Profession: Police officer, lawyer

Military service
- Allegiance: Philippines
- Branch/service: Philippine Constabulary
- Years of service: 1979–1991
- Police career
- Service: Philippine National Police
- Divisions: Criminal Investigation and Detection Group (CIDG); Northern Police District (NPD); Police Regional Office 4A (CALABARZON); Police Regional Office 6; Public Information Office; Caloocan City Police Station
- Service years: 1991–2013
- Rank: Police Director

Samuel Duldulao Pagdilao, Jr. (born February 13, 1957), is a retired Filipino police officer and politician who served in the House of Representatives from 2013 to 2016. Pagdilao used to work as a director in the Philippine National Police (PNP), holding multiple positions and receiving a number of distinctions and recognition in his 34-years as a police officer.

On October 13, 2015, Pagdilao announced his senatorial bid and filed his certificate of candidacy with the Commission on Elections (COMELEC). He placed 31st overall in the official count of the COMELEC's National Board of Canvassers.

== Early life ==
Pagdilao was born on February 13, 1957, to Samuel Salviejo Pagdilao, and Anunciacion Duldulao-Pagdilao in Cotabato City. His parents later served as Mayor of Pinili, Ilocos Norte in separate instances. His brother Joel is a former chief of the National Capital Region Police Office. His family later moved to General Santos, where he grew up.

== Education ==
In a radio interview, Pagdilao mentioned that he attended Dadiangas West Elementary School for his elementary education. He also attended the Notre Dame of Cotabato for a year, then transferred to Mindanao State University - General Santos Basic Education Department to complete his secondary education. He later entered the prestigious Philippine Military Academy (PMA), where he was chosen as the First Captain or Baron (equivalent to an organization's president) of his class, the Matapat Class of 1979. As First Captain, he acts as the immediate assistant of the Commandant of Cadets in the discipline, interior administration, training and general efficiency of the Cadet Corps. He then subsequently graduated from PMA with a Bachelor of Science degree in 1979. From 1979 to 1986, he was a Junior Officer of the 60th Battalion of the Philippine Constabulary, the precursor of the PNP. He was also a founding member of the Special Action Force. He then attended the Faculty of Civil Law of the University of Santo Tomas (UST), where he received his Bachelor of Laws cum laude in 1987. In 1995, he received his Master of Public Administration degree from Manuel L. Quezon University in 1995.

== Police career ==
After his stint in the Philippine Constabulary, he held a number of positions in PNP. In 1997, he was appointed as Chief of Police of the Caloocan City Police Station from 1997 to 2001. He was also the representative of the Republic of the Philippines to the International Coalition Planning Center for Operation Iraqi Freedom in US Central Command Headquarters at Tampa Bay, Florida from April to November 2003.

From 2006 to 2007, Pagdilao was the Spokesman and Chief of the Public Information Office of the PNP. He held a number of high-ranking positions in district and regional levels. From July to October 2010, he was the Regional Director of Police Regional Office 6 and from October 2010 to April 2011, he was the Regional Director of Police Regional Office 4A CALABARZON. His last stint in the agency was as the Chief of Criminal Investigation and Detection Group (CIDG).

== Political career ==
=== House of Representatives ===
ACT-CIS Partylist was elected in 2013 midterm elections with 377,165 votes, ranking 20th overall. In Congress, Pagdilao authored 38 House bills and resolutions, and co-sponsored 114 measures. He was selected as Vice Chairperson of the House Committee on Public Order and Safety. He was a member for the majority of the following committees: Banks And Financial Intermediaries; Dangerous Drugs; Energy; Information And Communications Technology; Justice; Metro Manila Development; Mindanao Affairs; National Defense And Security; Peace, Reconciliation And Unity; and, People's Participation.

Among his most notable bills filed in the 16th Congress were the following:

- HB02637 (AN ACT PROVIDING FOR ADDITIONAL BENEFITS AND INCENTIVES FOR BARANGAY TANODS, AMENDING FOR THE PURPOSE SECTION 393 OF REPUBLIC ACT NO. 7160, OTHERWISE KNOWN AS THE LOCAL GOVERNMENT CODE OF 1991)
- HB02777 (AN ACT MANDATING DRUG TESTING TO ALL CONVICTS, PAROLEES, PROBATIONERS AND APPREHENDED INDIVIDUALS WHO ARE UNDER THE INFLUENCE OF DANGEROUS DRUGS, AMENDING FOR THE PURPOSE REPUBLIC ACT NO. 9165, OTHERWISE KNOWN AS THE 'COMPREHENSIVE DANGEROUS DRUGS ACT OF 2002')
- HB03507 (AN ACT ESTABLISHING THE COMMUNITY INFORMANT REWARD ACT AND APPROPRIATING FUNDS THEREFOR)
- HB04451 (AN ACT TO INSTITUTIONALIZE AUTOMATIC REHABILITATION OF ARRESTED/APPREHENDED PERSONS FOUND TO BE DRUG DEPENDENT, AMENDING FOR THE PURPOSE REPUBLIC ACT NO. 9165, OTHERWISE KNOWN AS THE 'COMPREHENSIVE DANGEROUS DRUGS ACT OF 2002,' AND FOR OTHER PURPOSES)
- HB04541 (AN ACT PROVIDING FOR PROTECTION OF PREGNANT DETAINEES AND PRISONERS)
- HB05810 (AN ACT DESIGNATING BICYCLE LANES IN ALL PRIMARY AND SECONDARY ROADS AND TO ESTABLISH A BIKE-FRIENDLY COMMUNITIES)
- HB06301 (AN ACT ESTABLISHING A NATIONAL SEX OFFENDER REGISTRY SYSTEM AND PROVIDING FUNDS THEREFOR)

=== 2016 Senate election ===
Pagdilao announced his candidacy in an event held at the University of the Philippines Bahay ng Alumni. Right after the said event, he went straight to the COMELEC office in Intramuros to file his Certificate of Candidacy. His primary advocacy is on the advancement of peace and order in the country. Pagdilao primarily believes that the maintenance of a peaceful and orderly society is a necessary condition for the social and economic development of the country. Summed up by his tagline Kay Sir Tsip, Safe Ka! (lit. transl. With Sir Tsip, You Are Safe!), he advocates the following:

- Welfare of Barangay Officials and Tanods
- Community Involvement in Crime Prevention
- Modernization of the Philippine National Police and the Armed Forces of the Philippines
- Stronger punishment for murderers, rapists, kidnappers, and thieves.
- Eradication of corrupt practices in the government.

However, Pagdilao was unsuccessful, placing 31st overall in the official count of the COMELEC's National Board of Canvassers.

== Personal life ==
Pagdilao is married to Ma. Rosella Pagdilao (née Paño) and is a father to five children.

Pagdilao is also the main host of his radio program entitled Sir Tsir Reporting For Duty aired every Monday, Wednesday, and Friday at 5 pm on DZRJ-AM/8TriMedia Broadcasting Network.
