= 2022 Philippine Senate election =

34th Philippine senatorial election

- May 9, 2022

12 (of the 24) seats to the Senate of the Philippines 13 seats needed for a majority
Alliance	UniTeam	Reporma–NPC	TRoPa
Seats won	4+2 guests	3+2 guests	1+2 guests
Popular vote	120,752,210	82,579,024	53,753,651
Percentage	27.95	19.12	12.44
Alliance	TAP	Independent
Seats won	1+4 guests	3
Popular vote	42,493,747	82,194,853
Percentage	9.84	19.03

- Composition of the Senate after the election, with the seats up for election inside the box.
Senate President before election
Tito Sotto
NPC
Elected Senate President
Migz Zubiri
Independent

The 34th election of members to the Senate of the Philippines was held on May 9, 2022.

The seats of the 12 senators elected in 2016 were contested in this election, and the senators that will be elected in this election serve until June 30, 2028. The winners of this election will join the winners of the 2019 election to form the Senate's delegation to the 19th Congress of the Philippines with the senators elected in 2019 serving until June 30, 2025.

As the senatorial and presidential candidates appeared on the same ballot on election day, presidential candidates were able to present or endorse a slate of senatorial candidates. This year's election was unique as it saw cross-endorsements of candidates across several slates.

Candidates associated with the UniTeam won a plurality of seats up for election, with three candidates associated with Team Robredo–Pangilinan winning seats. UniTeam candidate Migz Zubiri was elected Senate president.

== Background ==
In the 2019 midterm election, Hugpong ng Pagbabago (HNP), the electoral coalition backed by the Duterte administration, won nine out of the twelve seats up, with three seats going to other parties and independents, and the primary opposition coalition, the Liberal Party-backed Otso Diretso, failed to win any seats. This led to the senators not affiliated with the Liberals to reelect Tito Sotto to the Senate presidency in 2019.

In 2021, Senator Panfilo Lacson said that a plot to oust Sotto from the Senate presidency allegedly "fizzled out" as the plotters failed to muster 13 votes to oust him.

=== Electoral system ===
The Philippines has a 24-member Senate elected at-large. Every three years since 1995, 12 seats are disputed. For 2022, the seats disputed in 2016 will be contested. Each voter has 12 votes, of which one can vote one to twelve candidates, or a multiple non-transferable vote; the twelve candidates with the most votes are elected.

Senators are limited to serving two consecutive terms, although they are eligible for a third (and succeeding) non-consecutive term. Only half of the seats are up in every senatorial election. The winning senators will succeed those elected in 2016, and will join those elected in 2019 to form the 19th Congress.

Each party or coalition endorses a slate of candidates, typically not exceeding a 12-person ticket. A party may also choose to invite "guest candidates" to complete its slate. The party may even include, with the candidates' consent, independent candidates and candidates from other parties as the party's guest candidates. Parties also may form coalitions to endorse a multi-party slate of candidates.

Winning candidates are proclaimed by the Commission on Elections (COMELEC), sitting as the National Board of Canvassers (NBOC). The NBOC usually proclaims senators-elect by batches, if that candidate can no longer fall to worse than twelfth place in the tally. Post-proclamation disputes are handled by the Senate Electoral Tribunal, a body composed of six senators and three justices from the Supreme Court.

=== Participating parties ===
Parties currently in the Senate
Party	Current seats			Previous elections		Bloc membership		*Ideology	*Political spectrum
Party	Not up	Up	Total	2016	2019	Majority	Minority	*Ideology	*Political spectrum
PDP–Laban	3	0	4 / 24	0	4	All	None	Populism	
Nacionalista	3	1	4 / 24	0	3	All	None	Conservatism	Center-right
Liberal	0	3	3 / 24	5	0	None	All	Liberalism	Center to center-left
NPC	1	2	3 / 24	2	1	All	None	Conservatism	Center-right
Other parties and independents	5	6	11 / 24	5	4	All but one	One	Varies	Varies
Total	12	12	24	12	12				

*Note: Political parties in the Philippines typically don't adhere to any political spectrum because people usually vote based on personality rather than ideology. The current political party system is personalistic, not programmatic.

=== Party-switching before the election ===
For senators running in this election cycle:

- Panfilo Lacson (independent) switched to Reporma on July 29, 2021, to run for president. He left Reporma on March 24, 2022, to become an independent.
- Joel Villanueva (CIBAC) became an independent when he filed his candidacy to run for senator.
- Manny Pacquiao (PDP–Laban) switched to PROMDI when he filed his candidacy to run for president.
- Dick Gordon (Independent) switched to Bagumbayan–VNP when he filed his candidacy to run for senator.

For senators whose seats are not up:

- Bong Go (PDP–Laban) switched to PDDS when he ran for president on November 13, 2021.

== Term-limited and retiring incumbents ==
=== Term limited incumbents ===
The following are ineligible from running since they are on their second consecutive six-year term:

1. Franklin Drilon (Liberal), retiring
  In 2020, Drilon personally counted himself out in running for president in 2022. A year later, he said that he was planning to retire from politics after his term ends if the succeeding administration would not have a role for him.
2. Ralph Recto (Nacionalista), running for House representative from Batangas's 6th district
  In 2021, Recto says that he mulls swapping positions with his wife, representative from Batangas Vilma Santos. Recto did file his candidacy to run for congressman from Batangas's 6th district, the seat Santos decided not to seek reelection for. Recto ran on his district unopposed,
3. Tito Sotto (NPC), running for vice president of the Philippines
  In July 2020, Sotto said that retirement would be his first option in 2022, as opposed to running for a higher position. A year later, he said that he would be open to running for vice president as Senator Panfilo Lacson's running mate. A month after that announcement, Lacson announced that he would run for president, with Sotto as his running mate. Sotto lost the election to Sara Duterte.

=== Retiring incumbents ===
The following senators' terms are ending in 2022. They were eligible to run again, but targeted other positions:

1. Panfilo Lacson (Reporma), running for president of the Philippines
  Lacson said in mid-2019 he would run for president if he has "a clear chance of winning." Two years later, it was announced that he would run for president instead of seeking re-election in the Senate, with an official announcement set on August 5. Days later, Lacson was sworn in as the new chairman of Partido para sa Demokratikong Reporma. Lacson lost the election to Bongbong Marcos.
2. Manny Pacquiao (PROMDI), running for president of the Philippines
  On September 19, Pacquiao at first officially accepted the nomination of PDP–Laban's Pimentel faction for president in the upcoming 2022 election. On October 1, Pacquiao filed his candidacy under PROMDI of the late Lito Osmeña, while there were leadership issues with PDP–Laban. Pacquiao lost the election to Bongbong Marcos.
3. Francis Pangilinan (Liberal), running for vice president of the Philippines
  In June 2021, Pangilinan announced that he would initially seek reelection in 2022. In October, he was selected to be Leni Robredo's running mate. Pangilinan lost the election to Sara Duterte.

=== Running for another position mid-term ===
Two incumbents initially ran for president and vice president, but both eventually withdrew:

1. Ronald dela Rosa (PDP–Laban)
  Dela Rosa originally filed to run for president of the Philippines, as Bong Go's presidential running mate. Dela Rosa withdrew his candidacy on November 13.
2. Bong Go (PDP–Laban)
  Go filed to run for vice president as dela Rosa's running mate. After Dela Rosa withdrew, Go withdrew his vice presidential candidacy to run for president, switching from PDP–Laban to Pederalismo ng Dugong Dakilang Samahan (PDDS). Go himself officially withdrew on December 14.

As both dela Rosa and Go withdrew, both won't give up their seats until their terms expire in 2025.

== Marginal seats ==
These are the marginal seats that had a winning margin of 5% or less against the 13th placed candidate in the 2016 election, in ascending order via margin:

Incumbent	Party	2016 margin	2022 results
Leila de Lima	Liberal	2.97%	Incumbent lost reelection
Ralph Recto	Nacionalista	3.25%	Incumbent term-limited
Sherwin Gatchalian	NPC	4.77%	Incumbent won reelection

== Coalitions ==
As this Senate election is concurrently held with a presidential election, some presidential candidates have presented senatorial slates, which typically have up to 12 names to round up the twelve seats up for election. Due to a dispute, PDP–Laban, the ruling party, was split into two factions that are part of different coalitions. Some candidates are included in multiple coalitions as guest candidates.

=== 1Sambayan ===
After releasing its choices of presidential and vice presidential candidates on June 12, 2021, Independence Day, Howard Calleja, one of the convenors of the opposition group 1Sambayan (Isambayan) said that former Bayan Muna representative Neri Colmenares was one of the group's choices to have their endorsement.

After the announcement of Leni Robredo's initial 11-person slate, 1Sambayan said it would also announce who they would support soon, while maintaining that they supported unconditionally the Robredo–Francis Pangilinan ticket for president and vice president. Antonio Trillanes accused Makabayan candidate Neri Colmenares of supporting Isko Moreno instead of backing 1Sambayan's candidate Leni Robredo. Makabayan denied endorsing the incumbent Manila Mayor Isko Moreno, pointing out they had yet to make a decision on the matter. On January 19, 2022, 1Sambayan endorsed 7 Senate bets in Robredo's ticket. Later that month, they endorsed Neri Colmenares, who is not included in Robredo's slate.

=== Aksyon Demokratiko ===
Aksyon Demokratiko was in talks with Nationalist People's Coalition, United Nationalist Alliance, and Partido para sa Demokratikong Reporma for an alliance. There have also been discussions between Aksyon president Isko Moreno and PDP–Laban's Manny Pacquiao faction, as well as between Moreno and the Liberal's Leni Robredo. On September 27, 2021, Aksyon announced two candidates, Samira Gutoc, who ran and lost in 2019 with the Liberals, and Carl Balita, for election. Former vice president and senator Noli de Castro filed to run for senator with Aksyon, but withdrew less than a week later. Jopet Sison, of Ipaglaban Mo! fame, replaced him. On February 24, Aksyon Demokratiko adopted John Castriciones of the PDP–Laban Cusi wing as a guest candidate, after a Duterte volunteer group he led endorsed Moreno the week before.

=== Labor and Ecology Advocates for Democracy ===
Leody de Guzman of Partido Lakas ng Masa (PLM) unveiled a Senate slate composed of nine people including two incumbents. The three people running under De Guzman's party PLM are labor leader Luke Espiritu of Bukluran ng Manggagawang Pilipino (BMP) and environmentalists Roy Cabonegro and David D'angelo. On October, de Guzman endorsed six more names as guest candidates. On February 18, Teddy Baguilat was revealed as the 12th and final candidate included in the PLM's slate. After the completion of the slate, it was branded as "Labor and Ecology Advocates for Democracy."

=== Lacson–Sotto slate ===
Senate President Tito Sotto announced his and Panfilo Lacson's candidacies for vice president and president, respectively, in July 2021. They also presented their initial list of possible senatorial candidates; these include mostly incumbents and former senators. In July 2021, an alliance between the Nationalist People's Coalition (NPC), United Nationalist Alliance (UNA) and Partido para sa Demokratikong Reporma has been the works with the possibility of the inclusion of Aksyon Demokratiko. A cooperation agreement has yet to be signed with the National Unity Party (NUP).

On October 14, Lacson hinted at a "surprise" senatorial candidate on their camp, while having already revealed 10 names, that includes incumbents. A day later, Lacson presented a 14-person slate (two more than the 12 open seats), which includes three from Lacson's Reporma, and six from Sotto's NPC.

At the start of the campaign period, the campaign dropped Herbert Bautista from their slate, citing Bautista's desire to represent the NPC in the UniTeam slate of Marcos and Duterte. In order to remain on multiple slates, the guest or common candidates agreed not to publicly endorse a particular presidential and vice presidential candidate. The next day, the campaign dropped Sherwin Gatchalian from their slate, citing his personal endorsement of the Marcos-Duterte tandem at the UniTeam proclamation rally. Other common candidates, such as Migz Zubiri, who also attended the UniTeam event, and Dick Gordon, who attended the Robredo-Pangilinan rally, were not dropped because no public endorsements were made. On early April, Zubiri was ultimately dropped when he endorsed Marcos on a rally in his home province of Bukidnon.

=== MP3 Alliance ===
PDP–Laban acting president Manny Pacquiao has been in separate talks with Aksyon Demokratiko's Isko Moreno and the Liberal Party's Leni Robredo. On September 19, 2021, Pacquiao formed an alliance with PROMDI and the People's Champ Movement (PCM).

On October 15, Pacquiao presented his senatorial slate that included candidates running for reelection, progressive leaders, and former senators. Pacquiao by that time only had eight candidates on his slate, as he said there were other people who wanted to be guest candidates.

=== Team Robredo–Pangilinan ===
The Liberal Party was in talks of alliance-building with Panfilo Lacson, Joel Villanueva, Nancy Binay, and Isko Moreno. Minority Leader and Liberal Vice-chairman Franklin Drilon stated that if Vice President Leni Robredo chose not to run for the presidency, the party would be open to coalesce under Manny Pacquiao. In August 2021, the party released the names of its initial slate for the Senate consisting of three incumbents, one former senator, and one former candidate. In September 2021, Robredo met separately with Moreno and Pacquiao. Liberal announced its initial slate on September 28, 2021.

On October 15, Robredo announced an 11-person slate, which included former rivals such as Vice President Jejomar Binay, and Francis Escudero, whom she beat for vice president in 2016. The 12th slot was being negotiated between Makabayan's Neri Colmenares and labor leader Sonny Matula. Colmenares said that it's Robredo's prerogative as the presidential candidate to choose her Senate slate. Colmenares later said that it was former senator Antonio Trillanes who was behind his exclusion from the line-up. Robredo announced that Sonny Matula was the 12th person in her Senate slate on October 22.

The slate was branded "Team Robredo–Pangilinan" or TRoPa during Robredo's proclamation rally in Naga, Camarines Sur.

=== Tuloy ang Pagbabago Coalition ===
The Tuloy ang Pagbabago coalition's slate is mostly composed of current members of the Cabinet, former senators seeking a return to the Senate, or personalities identified with President Rodrigo Duterte. During the national convention by the Alfonso Cusi faction, the party nominated mostly Cabinet members and allied lower House representatives in its initial slate. The coalition will hold a proclamation rally and present their 11-point agenda in March.

=== UniTeam ===
Partido Federal ng Pilipinas, one of the constituent parties of the UniTeam, announced that former presidential spokesperson Harry Roque of the People's Reform Party is a member of their senatorial slate. On January 20, 2022, UniTeam released their 10-person Senate slate. On February 5, the alliance added former Information and Communications Technology secretary Gregorio Honasan as the eleventh person on their slate; this is after Honasan's Reform Party nominated former Senator Bongbong Marcos and Sara Duterte for president and vice president, respectively. Sara Duterte announced Robin Padilla as the 12th and last member on February 16; however, the Marcos camp later stated that he was not part of their official slate. By March 11, Duterte said that Padilla is a guest candidate.

== Candidates ==
A total of 178 people filed candidacies for senator. A total of 114 people were found to be disallowed by the commission for being nuisance candidates, disqualified for other reasons, or have their candidacies cancelled.

Aksyon Demokratiko
#	Name	Party
6.	Carl Balita	Aksyon
13.	John Castriciones*	PDP–Laban
22.	JV Ejercito*	NPC
32.	Samira Gutoc	Aksyon
56.	Jopet Sison	Aksyon

Laban ng Masa - Labor and Ecology Advocates for Democracy (LEAD)
#	Name	Party
4.	Teddy Baguilat*	Liberal
12.	Roy Cabonegro	PLM
16.	Neri Colmenares*	Makabayan
17.	David d'Angelo	PLM
18.	Leila de Lima*	Liberal
21.	Chel Diokno*	KANP
26.	Luke Espiritu	PLM
32.	Samira Gutoc*	Aksyon
34.	Risa Hontiveros*	Akbayan
37.	Elmer Labog*	Makabayan
45.	Sonny Matula*	Independent

MP3 Alliance
#	Name	Party
7.	Lutgardo Barbo	PDP–Laban
11.	Jejomar Binay*	UNA
16.	Neri Colmenares*	Makabayan
22.	JV Ejercito*	NPC
25.	Francis Escudero*	NPC
31.	Dick Gordon*	Bagumbayan
37.	Elmer Labog*	Makabayan
40.	Loren Legarda*	NPC
59.	Raffy Tulfo*	Independent
61.	Joel Villanueva*	Independent

Tuloy ang Pagbabago
#	Name	Party
9.	Greco Belgica	PDDS
13.	John Castriciones	PDP–Laban
27.	Jinggoy Estrada*	PMP
39.	Rey Langit	PDP–Laban
40.	Loren Legarda*	NPC
43.	Rodante Marcoleta (withdrew)	PDP–Laban
49.	Robin Padilla	PDP–Laban
50.	Salvador Panelo	PDP–Laban
51.	Astra Pimentel-Naik	PDP–Laban
54.	Harry Roque*	PRP
57.	Gilbert Teodoro*	PRP
62.	Mark Villar*	Nacionalista
64.	Migz Zubiri*	Independent

Lacson–Sotto slate
#	Name	Party
11.	Jejomar Binay*	UNA
19.	Monsour del Rosario	Reporma
22.	JV Ejercito	NPC
23.	Guillermo Eleazar	Reporma
25.	Francis Escudero	NPC
31.	Dick Gordon*	Bagumbayan
33.	Gregorio Honasan*	Independent
40.	Loren Legarda	NPC
48.	Minguita Padilla	Reporma
52.	Emmanuel Piñol	NPC
59.	Raffy Tulfo*	Independent
61.	Joel Villanueva*	Independent

Team Robredo–Pangilinan
#	Name	Party
4.	Teddy Baguilat	Liberal
11.	Jejomar Binay*	UNA
18.	Leila de Lima	Liberal
21.	Chel Diokno	KANP
25.	Francis Escudero*	NPC
31.	Dick Gordon*	Bagumbayan
34.	Risa Hontiveros	Akbayan
38.	Alex Lacson	Ang Kapatiran
45.	Sonny Matula	Independent
58.	Antonio Trillanes	Liberal
61.	Joel Villanueva*	Independent

UniTeam
#	Name	Party
8.	Herbert Bautista	NPC
27.	Jinggoy Estrada	PMP
29.	Larry Gadon	KBL
30.	Sherwin Gatchalian	NPC
33.	Gregorio Honasan*	Independent
40.	Loren Legarda*	NPC
43.	Rodante Marcoleta* (withdrew)	PDP–Laban
49.	Robin Padilla*	PDP–Laban
54.	Harry Roque	PRP
57.	Gilbert Teodoro	PRP
62.	Mark Villar	Nacionalista
64.	Juan Miguel Zubiri	Independent

Labor Party Philippines
#	Name	Party
2.	Ibrahim Albani	WPP
15.	Melchor Chavez	WPP

Partido Maharlika
#	Name	Party
24.	Ernie Ereño	PM
53.	Willie Ricablanca Jr.	PM

Other non-independents
#	Name	Party
10.	Silvestre Bello Jr.	PDP–Laban
20.	Fernando Diaz	PPP
28.	Baldomero Falcone	DPP
42.	Emily Mallillin	PPM
46.	Marieta Mindalano-Adam	Katipunan
47.	Leo Olarte	Bigkis
55.	Nur-Ana Sahidulla	PDDS

Independents not in tickets
#	Name	Party
1.	Abner Afuang	Independent
3.	Jesus Arranza	Independent
5.	Agnes Bailen	Independent
14.	Alan Peter Cayetano	Independent
35.	RJ Javellana	Independent
36.	Nur-Mahal Kiram	Independent
41.	Ariel Lim	Independent
44.	Francis Leo Marcos	Independent
60.	Rey Valeros	Independent
63.	Carmen Zubiaga	Independent

*Guest candidates

== Opinion polling ==
Opinion polling in the Philippines is conducted by Social Weather Stations (SWS), Pulse Asia, OCTA Research, and other pollsters.

=== Per candidate ===
This list includes all individuals named by at least 10% of respondents in any of the surveys conducted after the campaigning officially began. The top 16 candidates with the highest favourability in each poll are listed below, where the top 12 are marked with a "black line". For a comprehensive list of all individuals included in the surveys, see the main article.

#	Feb 9–15		Feb 11–16		Feb 12–17		Feb 18–23		Mar 9–14		Mar 17–21		Mar 30–Apr 6		Apr 1–4		Apr 2–6		Apr 18–19		Apr 16–21		Apr 19–21		Apr 22–25	
#	I&AC		Publicus Asia		OCTA		Pulse Asia		Publicus Asia		Pulse Asia		Publicus Asia		RMN–APCORE		OCTA		MBC–DZRH		Pulse Asia		Publicus Asia		OCTA	
1	Cayetano	60	Escudero	50.7	Legarda	66	Tulfo	66.9	Escudero	48.8	Tulfo	65.6	Escudero	49.4	Tulfo	59	Tulfo	68	Tulfo	57.92	Tulfo	50.4	Escudero	46.8	Tulfo	63
2	Escudero	58	Cayetano	43.5	Tulfo	63	Legarda	58.9	Cayetano	41.6	Legarda	58.3	Cayetano	43.8	Legarda	47	Villar	59	Escudero	44.16	Legarda	49.4	Cayetano	42.6	Villar	55
3	Tulfo	53	Gatchalian	40.3	Cayetano	61	Villar	56.2	Legarda	39.5	Cayetano	56.4	Legarda	43.3	Escudero	44	Legarda	56	Legarda	43.19	Padilla	42.9	Gatchalian	40.5	Legarda	51
4	Legarda	50	Tulfo	37.3	Zubiri	60	Cayetano	55.0	Gatchalian	38.4	Escudero	54.4	Gatchalian	42.0	Villar	40	Zubiri	54	Cayetano	42.63	Cayetano	42.3	Legarda	39.1	Zubiri	49
5	Villar	47	Villar	34.7	Escudero	59	Zubiri	50.5	Tulfo	38.4	Villar	52.4	Tulfo	39.1	Cayetano	39	Escudero	50	Villar	41.57	Escudero	38.6	Tulfo	38.5	Escudero	46
6	Zubiri	47	Zubiri	34.5	Villar	56	Escudero	49.8	Villar	34.9	Gatchalian	50.3	Villar	35.9	Gatchalian	39	Cayetano	48	Zubiri	40.98	Gatchalian	37.0	Villar	33.1	Padilla	44
7	Gatchalian	45	Legarda	34.3	Padilla	43	Padilla	47.3	Hontiveros	32.2	Zubiri	50.1	Hontiveros	34.4	Zubiri	38	Padilla	44	Padilla	40.95	Zubiri	37.0	Hontiveros	31.9	Cayetano	40
8	Hontiveros	41	Hontiveros	31.3	Binay	39	Binay	45.6	Zubiri	31.2	Villanueva	43.9	Zubiri	33.5	Hontiveros	34	Binay	42	Gatchalian	38.56	Villar	35.9	Padilla	31.5	Gatchalian	39
9	Binay	38	Diokno	26.1	Gatchalian	39	Gatchalian	44.6	Diokno	29.5	Padilla	42.5	Diokno	30.5	Padilla	34	Estrada	42	Binay	33.47	Ejercito	34.3	Zubiri	29.3	Villanueva	36
10	Teodoro	38	Villanueva	25.9	Hontiveros	38	Villanueva	42.0	Villanueva	25.9	Binay	42.5	Teodoro	27.1	Binay	33	Villanueva	41	Villanueva	31.35	Binay	32.5	Bautista	29.1	Estrada	33
11	Ejercito	35	Gordon	25.0	Estrada	37	Estrada	38.6	Gadon	25.1	Estrada	36.5	Villanueva	26.7	Villanueva	33	Gatchalian	39	Hontiveros	31.33	Estrada	32.3	Diokno	28.9	Ejercito	31
12	Gordon	35	Teodoro	24.1	Ejercito	35	Bautista	32.6	Padilla	25.0	Ejercito	35.9	Gordon	26.0	Ejercito	29	Ejercito	36	Estrada	30.50	Hontiveros	32.3	Villanueva	28.2	Hontiveros	31
13	Villanueva	34	Padilla	23.3	Villanueva	33	Hontiveros	32.3	Roque	24.7	Hontiveros	35.9	Gadon	25.7	Estrada	28	Hontiveros	33	Ejercito	30.27	Bautista	26.6	Ejercito	26.5	Binay	31
14	Padilla	32	Ejercito	22.4	Bautista	31	Ejercito	31.6	Gordon	23.9	Bautista	34.3	Padilla	25.7	Bautista	25	Bautista	28	Honasan	26.28	Villanueva	26.5	Gadon	25.9	Bautista	27
15	Marcoleta	29	Bautista	21.9	Honasan	29	Gordon	27.3	Teodoro	23.3	Honasan	28.2	Ejercito	24.7	Honasan	21	Roque	25	Roque	25.27	Honasan	22.4	Teodoro	25.7	Roque	24
16	Estrada	28	Binay	21.8	Gordon	25	Honasan	26.5	Ejercito	22.7	Gordon	28.2	Bautista	24.1	Eleazar	20	Eleazar	24	Gordon	24.13	Gordon	19.3	Gordon	24.9	Eleazar	22

=== Per party ===
- Parties (excluding independents) with the plurality of seats in boldface.
- Parties (excluding independents) with the majority of seats are shaded by the party color.

==== Seats won ====
- Totals may not add up to 12 due to margin of error.

Date	Pollster	Akbayan	Aksyon	Bagumbayan	KANP	KBL	Liberal	Nacionalista	NPC	PDDS	PDP–Laban	Reporma	PMP	PRP	UNA	Ind
Apr 18–19, 2022	MBC–DZRH	1	0	0	0	0	0	1	4	0	1	0	1	0	1	4
Apr 2–6, 2022	OCTA	1	0	0	0	0	0	1	4	0	1	0	1	0	1	4
Apr 1–4, 2022	RMN–APCORE	1	0	0	0	0	0	1	4	0	1	0	1	0	1	4
Mar 30 – Apr 6, 2022	Publicus Asia	1	0	1	1	0	0	1	3	0	0	0	0	1	0	4
Mar 17–21, 2022	Pulse Asia	1	0	0	0	0	0	1	4	0	1	0	1	0	1	4
Mar 9–14, 2022	Publicus Asia	1	0	1	1	1	0	1	3	0	1	0	0	0	0	4
Feb 18–23, 2022	Pulse Asia	0	0	0	0	0	0	1	4	0	1	0	1	0	1	4
Feb 12–17, 2022	OCTA	1	0	0	0	0	0	1	4	0	1	0	1	0	1	3
Feb 11–16, 2022	Publicus Asia	1	0	1	1	0	0	1	3	0	0	0	0	1	0	4
Feb 9–15, 2022	I&AC	1	0	1	0	0	0	1	4	0	0	0	0	1	1	3
Jan 26–30, 2022	RMN–APCORE	1	0	0	0	0	0	1	4	0	1	0	1	0	1	4
Jan 22–30, 2022	RP-MDF	1	0	1	0	0	0	1	3	0	0	0	1	1	0	4
Jan 19–24, 2022	Pulse Asia	1	0	0	0	0	0	1	3	0	1	0	1	0	1	4
Dec 11–12, 2021	MBC–DZRH	0	0	0	0	0	0	1	4	1	1	0	1	0	1	3
Dec 6–12, 2021	I&AC	1	0	1	0	0	0	1	4	1	0	0	0	1	1	4
Dec 6–10, 2021	Publicus Asia	1	0	1	0	0	0	1	3	1	0	1	0	0	0	4
Dec 1–6, 2021	Pulse Asia	1	0	0	0	0	0	1	3	1	1	0	0	0	1	4
Nov 23–29, 2021	RMN–APCORE	0	0	0	0	0	0	1	3	1	1	0	1	0	1	4
Oct 20–23, 2021	SWS	1	1	0	0	0	0	1	2	0	1	0	1	0	1	4
Oct 11–18, 2021	Publicus Asia	1	1	1	1	0	0	1	3	0	0	0	0	0	0	4
Sep 12–16, 2021	SWS	1	0	0	0	0	1	1	3	0	0	0	1	0	0	5

==== Seats after the election ====
Totals may not add up to 24 due to margin of error.

Date	Pollster	Akbayan	Aksyon	Bagumbayan	CIBAC	KANP	KBL	Lakas	LDP	Liberal	Nacionalista	NPC	PDDS	PDP–Laban	Reporma	PMP	PRP	UNA	Ind
Apr 18–19	MBC–DZRH	1	0	1	0	0	0	1	1	0	4	**6**	1	4	0	1	0	2	6
Apr 1–4	RMN–APCORE	1	0	1	0	0	0	1	1	0	4	**6**	1	4	0	1	0	2	6
Mar 30 – Apr 6	Publicus Asia	1	0	1	0	1	1	1	1	0	4	**6**	1	4	0	0	1	1	5
Mar 17–21	Pulse Asia	1	0	1	0	0	0	1	1	0	4	**6**	1	4	0	1	0	2	6
Mar 9–14	Publicus Asia	1	0	1	0	1	1	1	1	0	4	**5**	1	4	0	0	2	1	5
Feb 18–23	Pulse Asia	1	0	1	0	0	0	1	1	0	4	**6**	1	4	0	1	0	2	6
Feb 12–17	OCTA	1	0	1	0	0	0	1	1	0	4	**6**	1	4	0	1	0	2	6
Feb 11–16	Publicus Asia	1	0	1	0	1	0	1	1	0	4	**6**	1	4	0	1	1	2	5
Feb 9–15	I&AC	1	0	1	0	0	0	1	1	0	4	**5**	1	4	0	0	1	2	5
Jan 26–30	RMN–APCORE	1	0	0	0	0	0	1	1	0	4	**6**	1	4	0	1	0	2	5
Jan 19–24, 2022	Pulse Asia	1	0	0	0	0	0	1	1	0	4	**5**	1	4	0	1	0	2	5
Dec 11–12	MBC–DZRH	1	0	0	0	0	0	1	1	0	4	**5**	2	4	0	1	0	2	5
Dec 6–12	I&AC	1	0	1	1	0	0	1	1	0	4	**5**	2	4	0	0	1	2	4
Dec 6–10	Publicus Asia	1	0	1	0	1	0	1	1	0	4	**5**	2	4	1	0	0	1	5
Dec 1–6	Pulse Asia	1	0	0	0	0	0	1	1	0	4	**5**	2	4	0	1	0	2	5
Nov 23–29	RMN–APCORE	1	0	0	1	0	0	1	1	1	**4**	**4**	2	4	0	1	0	2	4
Oct 20–23	SWS	1	1	1	0	0	0	1	1	0	4	**5**	1	4	0	1	0	2	5
Oct 11–18	Publicus Asia	1	1	1	0	1	0	1	1	0	4	**5**	1	4	0	0	1	1	6
Sep 12–16	SWS	1	0	0	0	0	0	1	1	2	**6**	5	1	3	0	1	0	2	6
Jun 30	Start of 18th Congress	1	0	0	1	0	0	1	1	3	4	3	0	**5**	0	0	0	1	4

=== Per coalition ===
Coalitions are expected to release 12-person slates for the election by the start of campaigning on February 8, 2022. On this section will be the surveys done after that day.

Date	Pollster	Aksyon	LEAD	MP3	Lacson–Sotto slate	TRoPa	tap	UniTeam	Others
Mar 17–21	MBC–DZRH	0	1	9	9	6	3	8	1
Apr 2–6	OCTA	0	1	8	6	5	4	7	1
Mar 17–21	RMN–APCORE	0	1	9	9	6	3	8	1
Mar 30 – Apr 6	Publicus Asia	0	2	8	7	6	3	8	1
Mar 17–21	Pulse Asia	0	1	9	9	6	3	8	1
Mar 9–14	Publicus Asia	0	2	8	7	6	4	7	1
Feb 18–23	Pulse Asia	0	1	9	9	6	3	8	1
Feb 12–17	OCTA	0	1	9	9	6	3	8	1
Feb 11–16	Publicus Asia	0	2	9	8	7	4	7	1
Feb 9–15	I&AC	0	1	9	8	6	4	6	1

== Campaign ==
The official campaign period as set by the Commission on Elections starts on February 8, 2022, and ends two days before the election on May 7. 2022. Campaigning is not allowed on April 14 and 15, Maundy Thursday and Good Friday, and on May 8, election eve for election silence.

=== February ===
Some candidates included in slates launched their candidacies in the proclamation rallies of their preferred presidential candidate. Some who were shared by multiple slates, opted to have their own proclamation rallies. Joel Villanueva launched his campaign via social media, with endorsements from presidential candidates Robredo, Lacson, Pacquiao and Moreno. Loren Legarda started her campaign at Liberman Gymnasium in Pandan, Antique. JV Ejercito did a motorcade around San Juan, Metro Manila, where he previously served as mayor. 9 out of 11 candidates in the UniTeam slate attended the rally in the Philippine Arena in Bulacan, while Gregorio Honasan sent his wife as his representative and Legarda gave a videotaped message. Jejomar Binay chose to hold his proclamation rally in Batangas. Team Robredo–Pangilinan's (TRoPa) slate was presented at that ticket's proclamation rally in Naga, where seven where able to attend, while two sent in a videotaped message. Just outside Manila City Hall, Moreno presented his three-person senatorial slate, who were all present; also in attendance was John Castricciones, who is running under the ruling PDP–Laban. At the Imus Grandstand in Cavite, the Lacson proclamation rally was attended by all three Reporma members, and two of the NPC members, while three of his guest candidates sent in videotaped messages. In the Pacquiao proclamation rally in General Santos, Lutgardo Barbo and Raffy Tulfo were presented as included in his slate, while five gave videotaped messages, and Sherwin Gatchalian was represented by his fiancé Bianca Manalo.

On February 15, reports emerged that the Lacson–Sotto tandem dropped Jejomar Binay and Dick Gordon from their slate. The Lacson–Sotto campaign denied the reports, saying that the two are still in their slate, while Binay said that he honored their gentleman's agreement not to endorse other tandems. Meanwhile, the campaign also clarified that with their slate having 13 names, they have 10 people who will surely be within their slate and that they will campaign for these ten people moving forward.

=== March ===
In SMNI's senatorial forum, Partido Lakas ng Masa candidate Luke Espiritu had a verbal spat with UniTeam candidates Larry Gadon and Harry Roque. Espiritu called out Gadon "It’s still my time, don’t be rude" when the latter was interrupting him on the topic of how schools should teach "correct values"; Gadon had earlier accused the Catholic Church of espousing anti-Marcos and pro-communist propaganda, failing to impart "correct values" upon children. Later in the forum, Roque said that "There was nothing respectful with what you said against me. The truth is that we are not talking about the dead Marcos. We are talking about the living Marcos," after Espiritu said that Roque was anti-Marcos before but "now that you were given a Senate spot under the party of Bongbong Marcos, you cry hallelujah and praise Marcos."

After several campaign rallies where he has been a part of, Sara Duterte clarified that Robin Padilla is now a guest candidate of the UniTeam. This was a change from her statement that Padilla is not yet a part of the alliance.

Later that month, presidential candidate Panfilo Lacson resigned from Partido para sa Demokratikong Reporma, and continued his candidacy as an independent. Hours after this development, Monsour del Rosario, one of Reporma's senatorial candidates, shifted his support from Lacson to Leni Robredo. The other non-guest candidates of the slate, Guillermo Eleazar, Minguita Padilla and Emmanuel Piñol, stayed loyal with Lacson.

=== April ===
On early April, during the UniTeam campaign in his home province of Bukidnon, Migz Zubiri and his family publicly supported Marcos. This caused the Lacson campaign to drop him from their Senate slate. Later in the month, the Robredo campaign also removed Zubiri from their slate.

On the same day Zubiri was removed from TRoPa, Rodante Marcoleta announced that he was withdrawing his candidacy. The commission later confirmed that it had accepted his withdrawal. Marcoleta cited his poor showing in the surveys as the reason for his withdrawal, but stressed that he will continue to support Marcos and Duterte.

A day later, Kerwin Espinosa, one of those who accused senator Leila de Lima of being involved in the illegal drug trade in the New Bilibid Prison, recanted his statements on the case, and said that he was coerced by the police days after his father, Albuera mayor Rolando Espinosa Sr., was killed when the latter was being served his warrant of arrest. The Department of Justice downplayed the younger Espinosa's recantation, saying it did not affect their case against de Lima, who is currently detained, as he was not a witness.

=== May ===
In early May, Rafael Zagos, former Bureau of Corrections director general and another witness in the de Lima drug case recanted his testimony. Ragos previously testified that de Lima accepted 5 million pesos from him via drug lord Peter Co, while she was Secretary of Justice, and that it was later used to fun her senatorial campaign in 2016.

A week before the election, Lorenzo Leviste, Loren Legarda's son, wrote in a Rappler column that he is "absolutely disgusted by my mother and what she has decided to do," that is, run under the UniTeam slate of Bongbong Marcos. Also on the same day, the Iglesia ni Cristo released its list of endorsements for the senatorial election via an announcement aired on Net 25. A day later, Labor and Ecology Advocates for Democracy dropped Agnes Bailen from their slate.

== Results ==
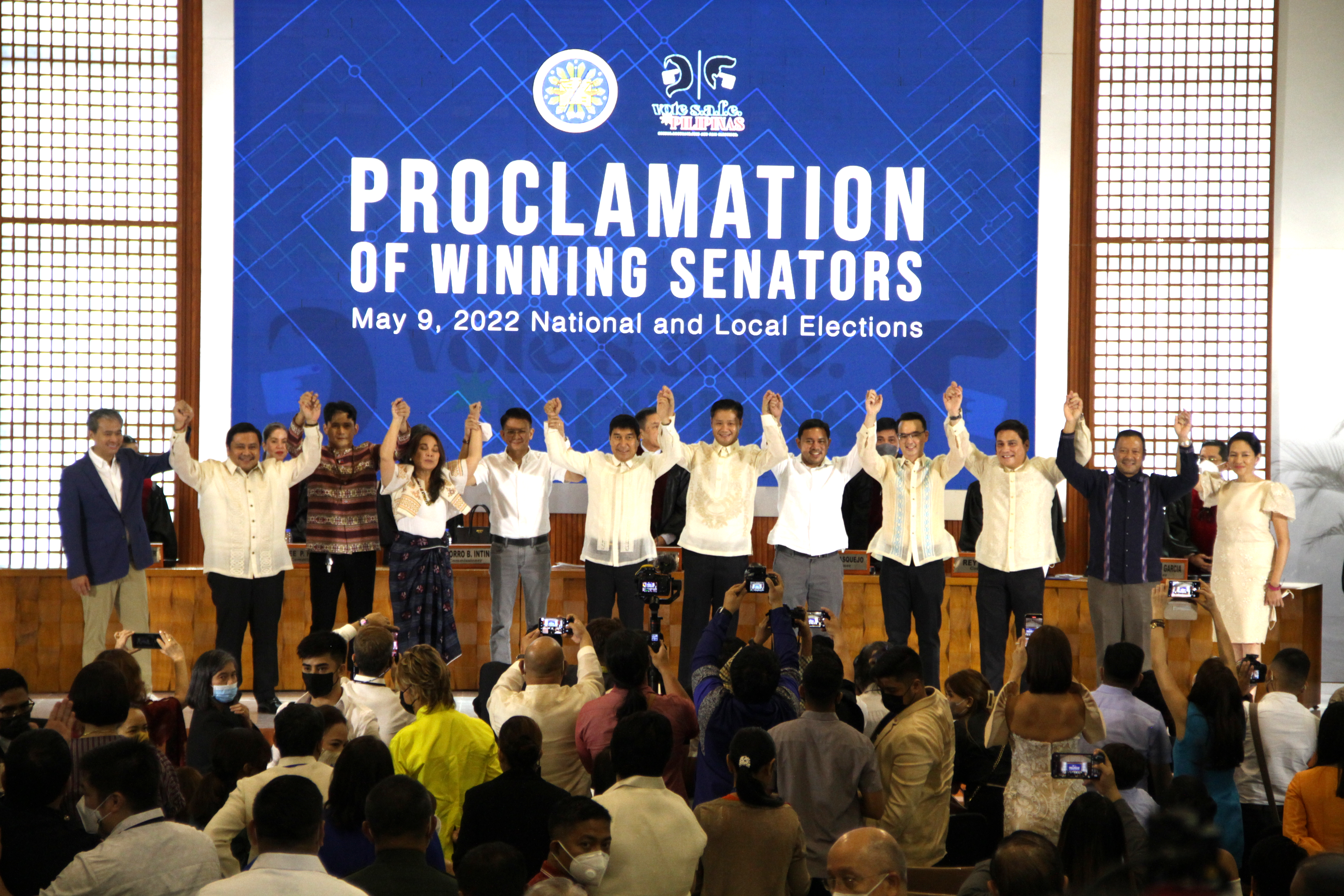
Proclamation of winning senators of the May 9, 2022 Senate elections

The commission originally expected to proclaim the winners in seven days. A week after the election, the commission said it planned to proclaim the winners on May 18. The commission, sitting as the National Board of Canvassers, proclaimed the winning senators on May 18, as the last certificate of canvass—from Lanao del Sur—had yet to be canvassed but no longer materially affected the outcome of the election.

UniTeam's Sherwin Gatchalian and Juan Miguel Zubiri, shared guest candidate Joel Villanueva, and Risa Hontiveros of TRoPa all successfully defended their seats. Returning senators are UniTeam's Jinggoy Estrada, his half-brother JV Ejercito of the Lacson–Sotto slate, shared candidates Loren Legarda and Francis Escudero, and independent Alan Peter Cayetano. Neophyte senators are topnotcher Robin Padilla of Tuloy na Pagbabago, shared candidate Raffy Tulfo, and UniTeam's Mark Villar.

Two former senators, Gregorio Honasan, and Antonio Trillanes, lost their bids to reenter the Senate.

Incumbents Dick Gordon and Leila de Lima failed to defend their seats.

		1	2	3	4	5	6	7	8	9	10	11	12	13	14	15	17	16	18	19	20	21	22	23	24
Before election	Senate bloc	Majority bloc																			Minority bloc				Maj
Before election	Party	‡												‡	‡	‡	‡	‡	‡	‡	‡	‡	‡	‡	
Election results		Ind	Not up											TAP	UniTeam				Lacson–Sotto slate			Ind		TRoPa	Not up
After election	Party	*												*	*	+	√	√	+	*	*	√	*	√	
After election	Senate bloc	Ind bloc		Majority bloc																				Minority bloc	

Proclamation ceremony of the elected senators of the 2022 elections

Key:
‡	Seats up
*	Gained by a party from another party
√	Held by the incumbent
+	Held by the same party with a new senator

=== Per candidate ===
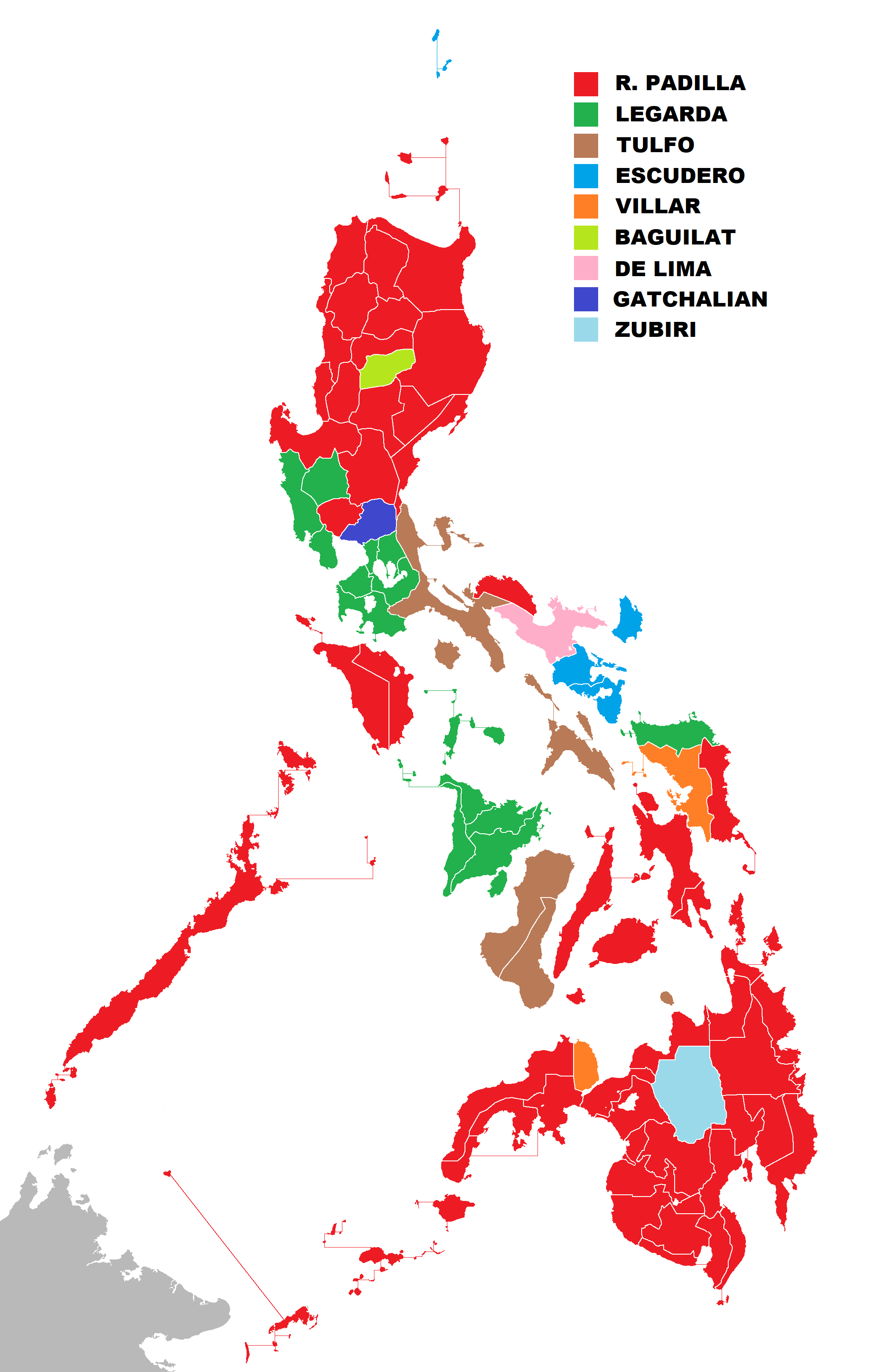
First-placing candidate per province in the Philippines during the Senate election 2022

Candidate	Party or alliance		Votes	%
Robin Padilla	Tuloy ang Pagbabago (Note: Guest candidate of the UniTeam)	PDP–Laban	26,612,434	47.91
Loren Legarda	Lacson–Sotto slate (Note: Guest candidate of the MP3 Alliance) (Note: Guest candidate of Tuloy ang Pagbabago)	Nationalist People's Coalition	24,264,969	43.68
Raffy Tulfo	Independent (Note: Guest candidate of the Lacson–Sotto slate)		23,396,954	42.12
Sherwin Gatchalian	UniTeam	Nationalist People's Coalition	20,602,655	37.09
Francis Escudero	Lacson–Sotto slate (Note: Guest candidate of Team Robredo–Pangilinan)	Nationalist People's Coalition	20,271,458	36.49
Mark Villar	UniTeam	Nacionalista Party	19,475,592	35.06
Alan Peter Cayetano	Independent		19,295,314	34.74
Juan Miguel Zubiri	UniTeam	Independent	18,734,336	33.73
Joel Villanueva	Independent		18,486,034	33.28
JV Ejercito	Lacson–Sotto slate (Note: Guest candidate of Aksyon Demokratiko)	Nationalist People's Coalition	15,841,858	28.52
Risa Hontiveros	Team Robredo–Pangilinan (Note: Guest candidate of Laban ng Masa)	Akbayan	15,420,807	27.76
Jinggoy Estrada	UniTeam	Pwersa ng Masang Pilipino	15,108,625	27.20
Jejomar Binay	United Nationalist Alliance		13,263,970	23.88
Herbert Bautista	UniTeam	Nationalist People's Coalition	13,104,710	23.59
Gilbert Teodoro	UniTeam	People's Reform Party	12,788,479	23.02
Guillermo Eleazar	Lacson–Sotto slate	Partido para sa Demokratikong Reporma	11,305,322	20.35
Harry Roque	UniTeam	People's Reform Party	11,246,206	20.25
Gregorio Honasan	Independent		10,643,491	19.16
Chel Diokno	Team Robredo–Pangilinan	Katipunan ng Nagkakaisang Pilipino	9,978,444	17.96
Larry Gadon	UniTeam	Kilusang Bagong Lipunan	9,691,607	17.45
Antonio Trillanes	Team Robredo–Pangilinan	Liberal Party	8,630,272	15.54
Dick Gordon	Bagumbayan–VNP		8,377,893	15.08
Leila de Lima	Team Robredo–Pangilinan	Liberal Party	7,278,602	13.10
Neri Colmenares	Makabayan		6,098,782	10.98
Alex Lacson	Team Robredo–Pangilinan	Ang Kapatiran	5,477,088	9.86
Salvador Panelo	Tuloy ang Pagbabago	PDP–Laban	4,887,066	8.80
Francis Leo Marcos	Independent		4,538,857	8.17
Teddy Baguilat	Team Robredo–Pangilinan	Liberal Party	4,275,873	7.70
Monsour del Rosario	Lacson–Sotto slate	Partido para sa Demokratikong Reporma	3,810,096	6.86
Carl Balita	Aksyon Demokratiko		3,730,164	6.71
Rodante Marcoleta (Note: Withdrew but remained on the ballot)	Tuloy ang Pagbabago	PDP–Laban	3,591,899	6.47
Emmanuel Piñol	Lacson–Sotto slate	Nationalist People's Coalition	3,544,283	6.38
Minguita Padilla	Lacson–Sotto slate	Partido para sa Demokratikong Reporma	3,541,038	6.37
Luke Espiritu	Laban ng Masa	Partido Lakas ng Masa	3,470,550	6.25
Astra Pimentel-Naik	Tuloy ang Pagbabago	PDP–Laban	2,975,908	5.36
Sonny Matula	Team Robredo–Pangilinan	Independent	2,692,565	4.85
Greco Belgica	Tuloy ang Pagbabago	Pederalismo ng Dugong Dakilang Samahan	2,349,040	4.23
Jopet Sison	Aksyon Demokratiko		2,218,095	3.99
Samira Gutoc	Aksyon Demokratiko		1,834,705	3.30
Carmen Zubiaga	Independent		1,763,898	3.18
Silvestre Bello Jr.	PDP–Laban		1,738,387	3.13
Elmer Labog	Makabayan		1,578,385	2.84
Rey Langit	Tuloy ang Pagbabago	PDP–Laban	1,364,548	2.46
Melchor Chavez	Labor Party Philippines		953,241	1.72
Abner Afuang	Independent		901,196	1.62
Roy Cabonegro	Laban ng Masa	Partido Lakas ng Masa	880,919	1.59
Ibrahim Albani	Labor Party Philippines		792,117	1.43
Lutgardo Barbo	MP3 Alliance	PDP–Laban	749,472	1.35
John Castriciones	Tuloy ang Pagbabago	PDP–Laban	712,852	1.28
David d'Angelo	Laban ng Masa	Partido Lakas ng Masa	693,932	1.25
Agnes Bailen	Independent		670,678	1.21
Nur-Mahal Kiram	Independent		585,337	1.05
Nur-Ana Sahidulla	Pederalismo ng Dugong Dakilang Samahan		572,645	1.03
Leo Olarte	Bigkis Pinoy Movement		567,649	1.02
Ariel Lim	Independent		560,660	1.01
Fernando Diaz	Partido Pilipino sa Pagbabago		557,522	1.00
Jesus Arranza	Independent		526,705	0.95
Willie Ricablanca Jr.	Partido Maharlika		490,712	0.88
RJ Javellana	Independent		471,999	0.85
Marieta Mindalano-Adam	Katipunan ng Kamalayang Kayumanggi		446,295	0.80
Ernie Ereño	Partido Maharlika		408,366	0.74
Baldomero Falcone	Democratic Party of the Philippines		396,527	0.71
Emily Mallillin	Partido Pederal ng Maharlika		390,134	0.70
Rey Valeros	Independent		353,730	0.64
Total			431,983,947	100.00
Total votes			55,549,791	–
Registered voters/turnout			66,839,976	83.11
Source: COMELEC

==== Provincial results per candidate ====
Robin Padilla

Loren Legarda

Raffy Tulfo

Sherwin Gatchalian

Francis Escudero

Mark Villar

Alan Peter Cayetano

Migz Zubiri

Joel Villanueva

JV Ejercito

Risa Hontiveros

Jinggoy Estrada

Jejomar Binay

Herbert Bautista

Gilbert Teodoro

Guillermo Eleazar

Harry Roque

Gregorio Honasan

Chel Diokno

Larry Gadon

Antonio Trillanes

Dick Gordon

Leila de Lima

Neri Colmenares

=== Per coalition ===
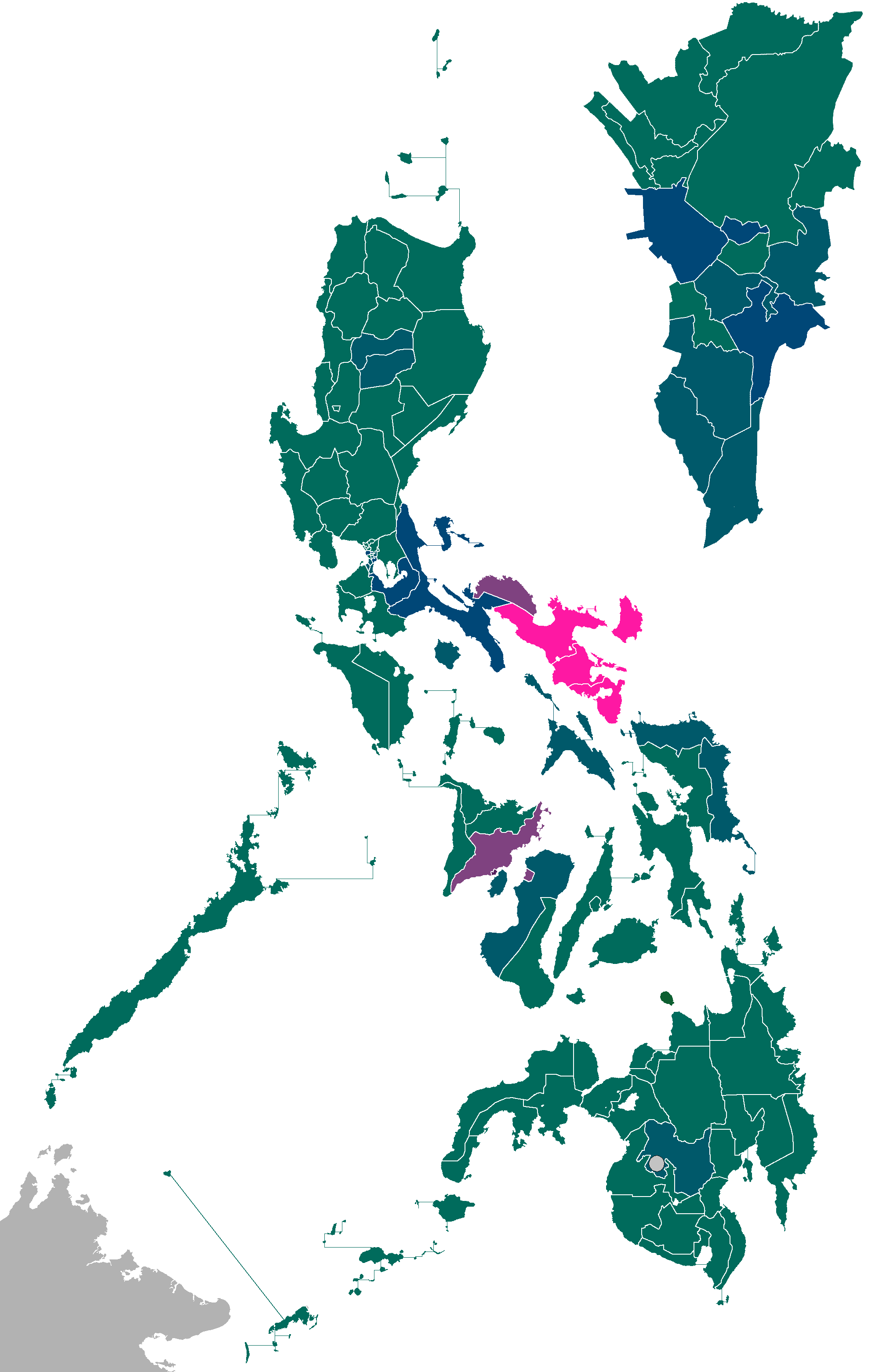
Results of the election per province/city, with Metro Manila on the inset at the top right. Results are determined via nationwide vote, the map represents if the results were determined per province/city, with each province/city being determined by the coalition that had the most candidates in the top 12 in that area. Reporma–NPC TRoPa UniTeam Reporma–NPC/UniTeam tie TRoPa/UniTeam tie Reporma–NPC/TRoPa/UniTeam tie

The seats won totals does not account for guest candidates unless specified.

Party or alliance		Votes	%	Seats
UniTeam	Nationalist People's Coalition	33,707,365	7.80	1
UniTeam	People's Reform Party	24,034,685	5.56	0
UniTeam	Nacionalista Party	19,475,592	4.51	1
UniTeam	Pwersa ng Masang Pilipino	15,108,625	3.50	1
UniTeam	Kilusang Bagong Lipunan	9,691,607	2.24	0
UniTeam	Independent	18,734,336	4.34	1
UniTeam	Total	120,752,210	27.95	4
Lacson–Sotto slate	Nationalist People's Coalition	63,922,568	14.80	3
Lacson–Sotto slate	Partido para sa Demokratikong Reporma	18,656,456	4.32	0
Lacson–Sotto slate	Total	82,579,024	19.12	3
Team Robredo–Pangilinan	Liberal Party	20,184,747	4.67	0
Team Robredo–Pangilinan	Akbayan	15,420,807	3.57	1
Team Robredo–Pangilinan	Katipunan ng Nagkakaisang Pilipino	9,978,444	2.31	0
Team Robredo–Pangilinan	Ang Kapatiran	5,477,088	1.27	0
Team Robredo–Pangilinan	Independent	2,692,565	0.62	0
Team Robredo–Pangilinan	Total	53,753,651	12.44	1
Tuloy ang Pagbabago	PDP–Laban (Cusi wing)	40,144,707	9.29	1
Tuloy ang Pagbabago	Pederalismo ng Dugong Dakilang Samahan	2,349,040	0.54	0
Tuloy ang Pagbabago	Total	42,493,747	9.84	1
United Nationalist Alliance		13,263,970	3.07	0
Bagumbayan–VNP		8,377,893	1.94	0
Aksyon Demokratiko		7,782,964	1.80	0
Makabayan		7,677,167	1.78	0
Laban ng Masa		5,045,401	1.17	0
Labor Party Philippines		1,745,358	0.40	0
PDP–Laban (Pimentel wing)		1,738,387	0.40	0
Partido Maharlika		899,078	0.21	0
MP3 Alliance		749,472	0.17	0
Pederalismo ng Dugong Dakilang Samahan		572,645	0.13	0
Bigkis Pinoy Movement		567,649	0.13	0
Partido Pilipino sa Pagbabago		557,522	0.13	0
Katipunan ng Kamalayang Kayumanggi		446,295	0.10	0
Democratic Party of the Philippines		396,527	0.09	0
Partido Pederal ng Maharlika		390,134	0.09	0
Independent		82,194,853	19.03	3
Total		431,983,947	100.00	12
Total votes		55,549,791	–	
Registered voters/turnout		66,839,976	83.11	

Vote share
UniTeam	27.95%
Lacson–Sotto	19.12%
TRoPa	12.44%
TAP	9.84%
Independent	19.03%
Others	11.62%

Senate seats
UniTeam	33.33%
Lacson–Sotto	25.00%
TRoPa	8.33%
TAP	8.33%
Independent	25.00%
Others	0%

==== Totals showing guest candidates ====
Coalition	Non-guests	Guests	Total
Aksyon	0	1	1
Laban ng Masa	0	1	1
Reporma–NPC	3	2	5
MP3 Alliance	0	5	5
UniTeam	4	2	6
TAP	1	4	5
TRoPa	1	2	3

==== Provincial results per coalition ====
In these maps, the result in each province or city is treated in isolation, unlike the actual results which is taken nationally. It shows how many members in each coalition finished in the top 12 positions in each province and city.

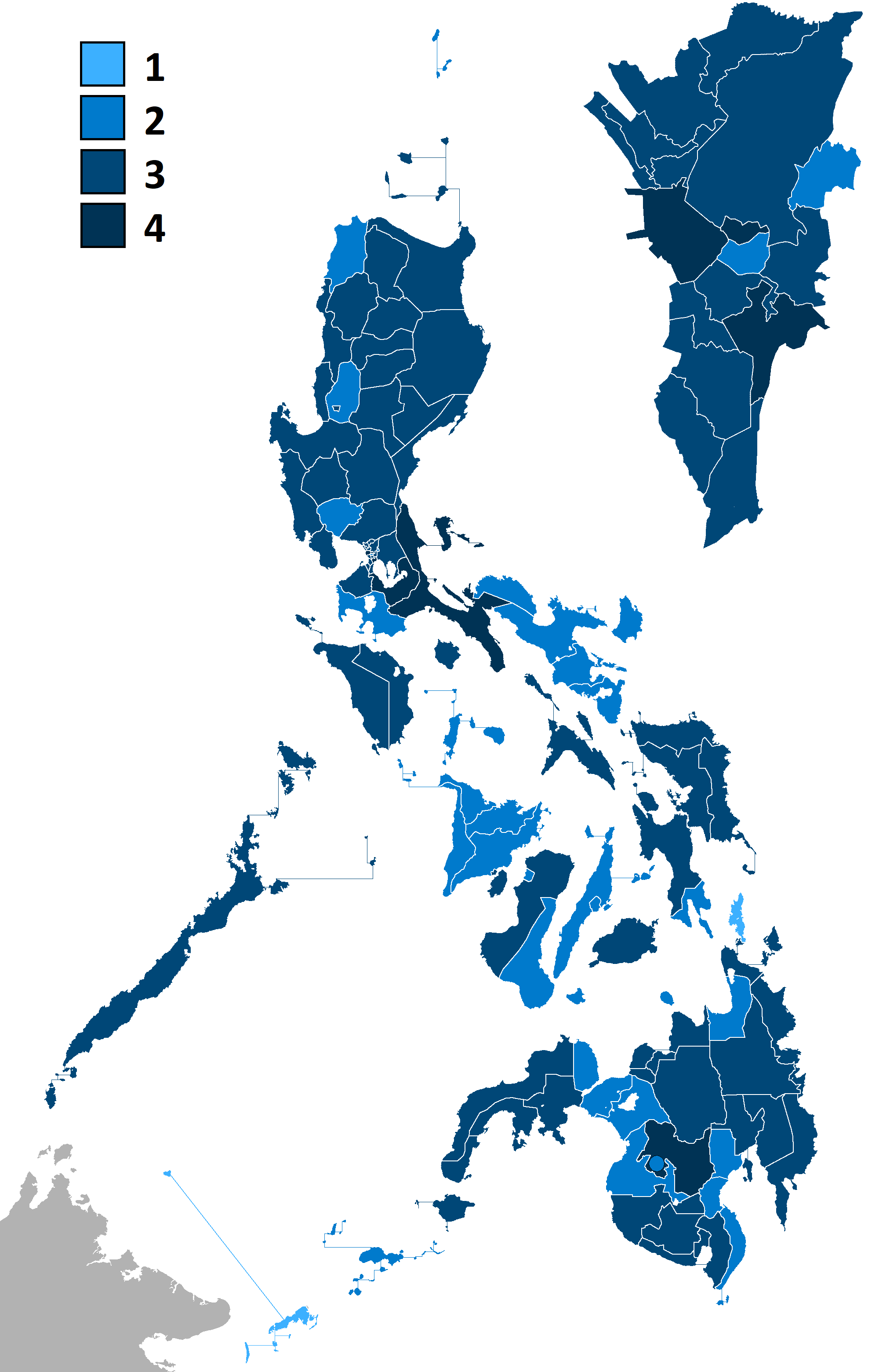
Lacson–Sotto slate

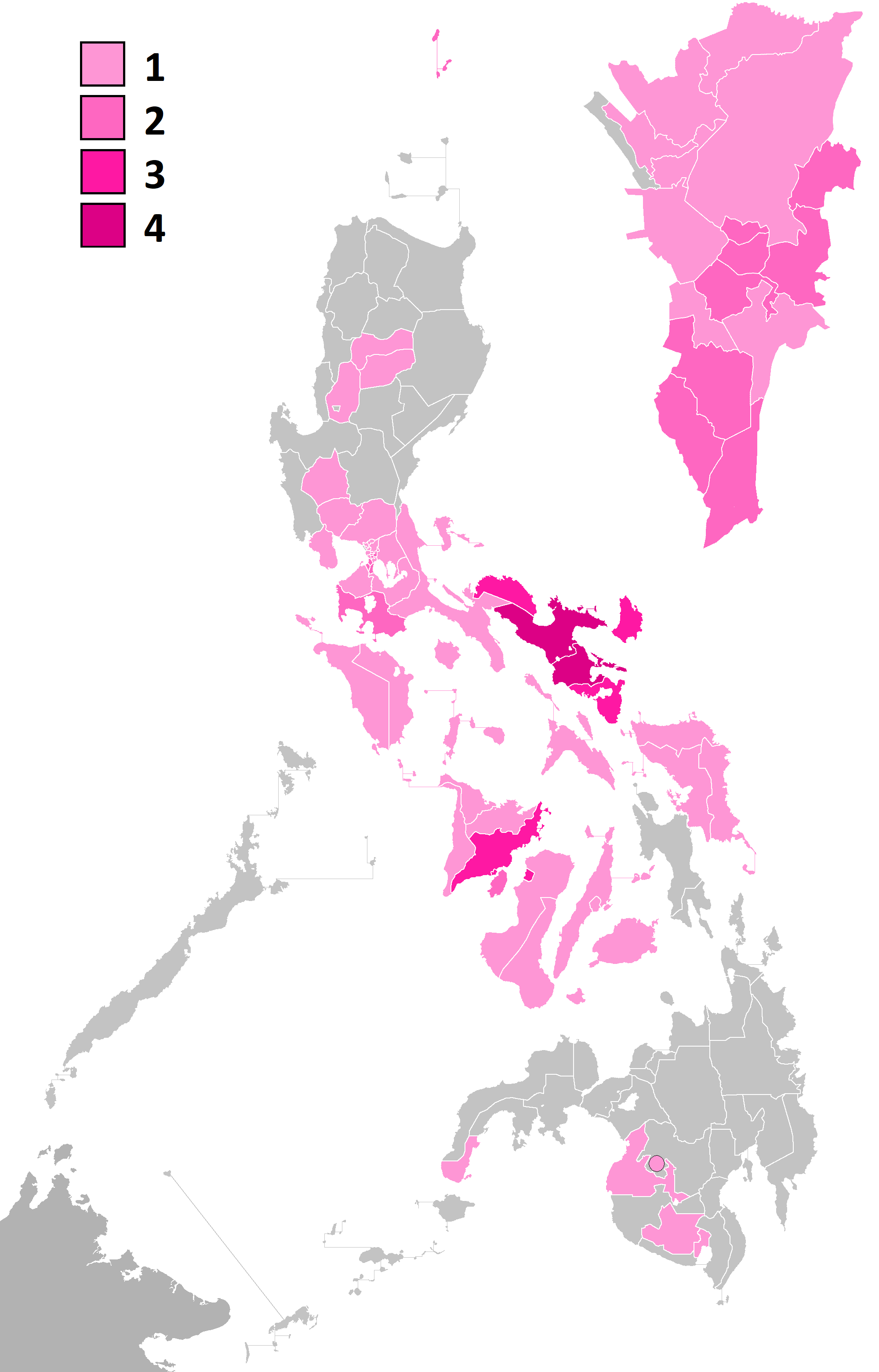
Team Robredo–Pangilinan

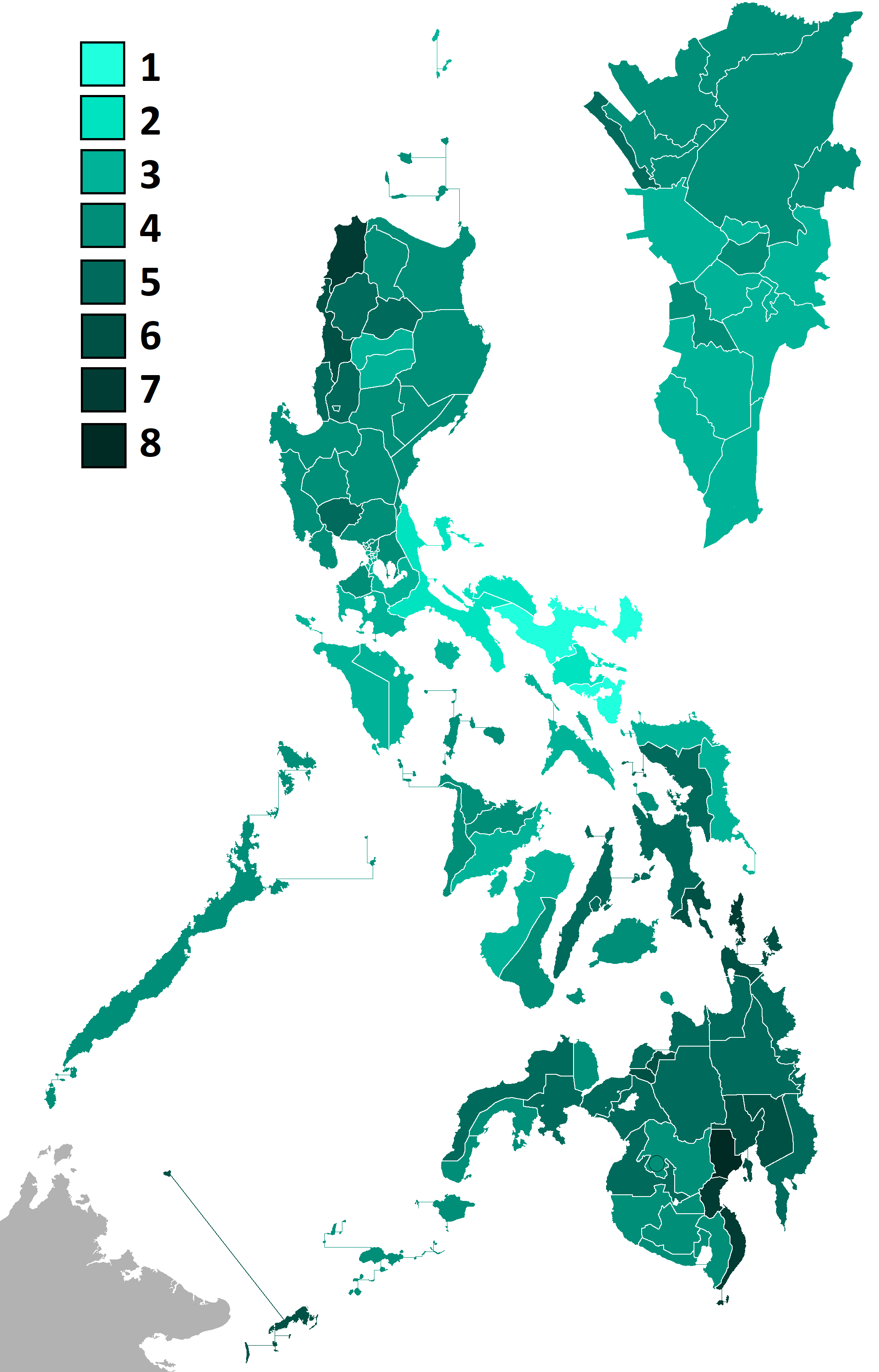
UniTeam

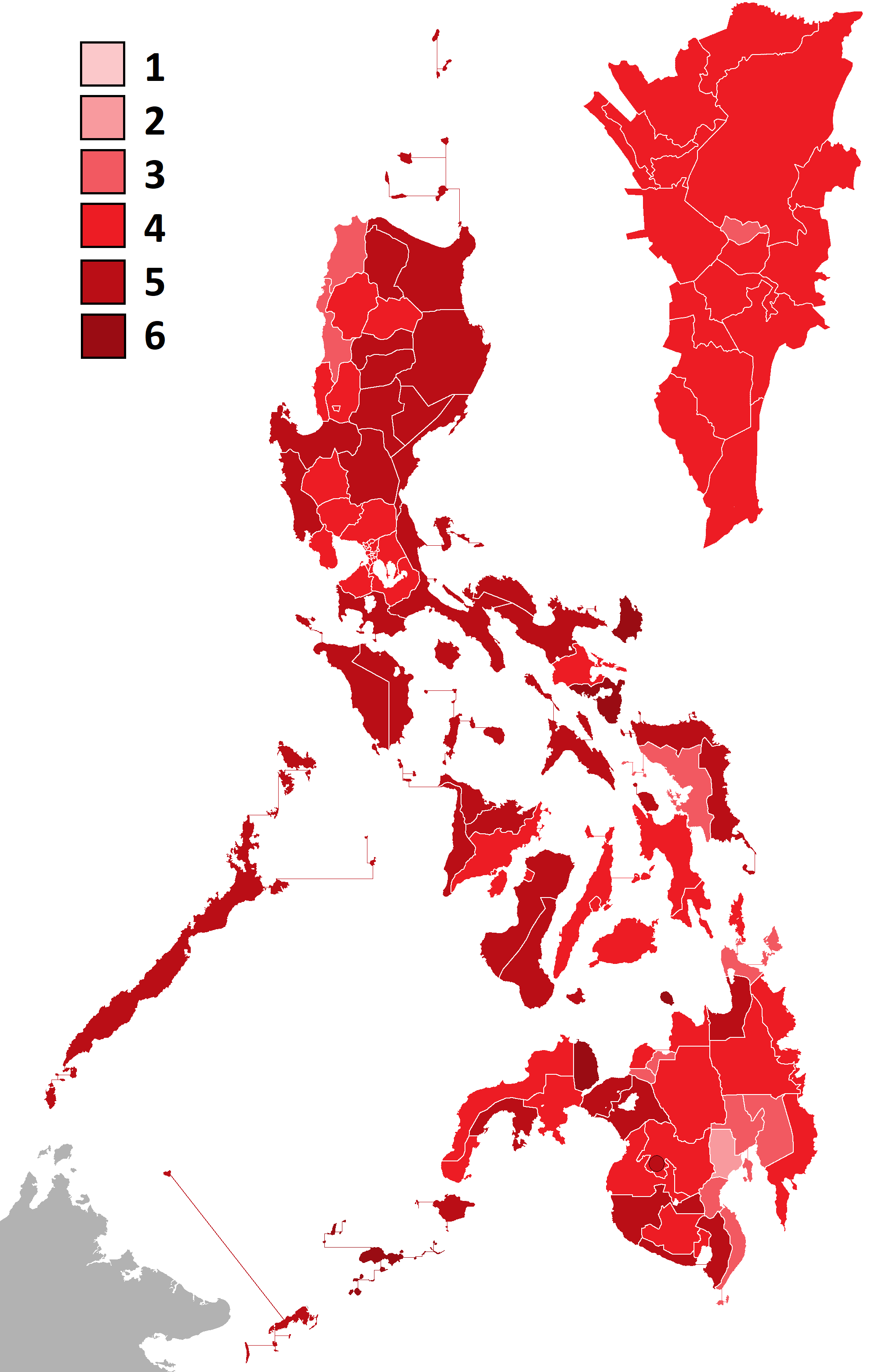
Other candidates

=== Per party ===
Party	Votes	%	+/–	Seats				
Party	Votes	%	+/–	Up	Before	Won	After	+/−
Nationalist People's Coalition	97,629,933	22.60	+13.91	2	3	4	5	+2
PDP–Laban	42,632,566	9.87	−11.43	0	3	1	4	+1
People's Reform Party	24,034,685	5.56	New	0	0	0	0	0
Liberal Party	20,184,747	4.67	−7.29	3	3	0	0	−3
Nacionalista Party	19,475,592	4.51	−12.33	1	4	1	4	0
Partido para sa Demokratikong Reporma	18,656,456	4.32	New	0	0	0	0	0
Akbayan	15,420,807	3.57	New	1	1	1	1	0
Pwersa ng Masang Pilipino	15,108,625	3.50	−1.12	0	0	1	1	+1
United Nationalist Alliance	13,263,970	3.07	−1.06	0	1	0	1	0
Katipunan ng Nagkakaisang Pilipino	9,978,444	2.31	New	0	0	0	0	0
Kilusang Bagong Lipunan	9,691,607	2.24	+1.27	0	0	0	0	0
Bagumbayan–VNP	8,377,893	1.94	+1.37	1	1	0	0	−1
Aksyon Demokratiko	7,782,964	1.80	+1.13	0	0	0	0	0
Makabayan	7,677,167	1.78	+0.48	0	0	0	0	0
Ang Kapatiran	5,477,088	1.27	New	0	0	0	0	0
Partido Lakas ng Masa	5,045,401	1.17	+0.91	0	0	0	0	0
Pederalismo ng Dugong Dakilang Samahan	2,921,685	0.68	New	0	1	0	1	0
Labor Party Philippines	1,745,358	0.40	−0.52	0	0	0	0	0
Partido Maharlika	899,078	0.21	New	0	0	0	0	0
Bigkis Pinoy Movement	567,649	0.13	New	0	0	0	0	0
Partido Pilipino sa Pagbabago	557,522	0.13	New	0	0	0	0	0
Katipunan ng Kamalayang Kayumanggi	446,295	0.10	New	0	0	0	0	0
Democratic Party of the Philippines	396,527	0.09	New	0	0	0	0	0
Partido Pederal ng Maharlika	390,134	0.09	New	0	0	0	0	0
Independent	103,621,754	23.99	+9.05	3	4	4	5	+1
Laban ng Demokratikong Pilipino				0	1	0	1	0
Lakas–CMD				0	1	0	1	0
PROMDI				1	1	0	0	−1
Total	431,983,947	100.00	–	12	24	12	24	0
Total votes	55,549,791	–						
Registered voters/turnout	66,839,976	83.11						
Source: COMELEC

Vote share
NPC	22.60%
PDP–Laban	9.87%
PRP	5.56%
Liberal	4.67%
Nacionalista	4.51%
Reporma	4.32%
Akbayan	3.57%
PMP	3.50%
Independent	23.99%
Others	17.41%

Seats won
NPC	33.33%
PDP–Laban	8.33%
PRP	0.00%
Liberal	0.00%
Nacionalista	8.33%
Reporma	0.00%
Akbayan	8.33%
PMP	8.33%
Independent	33.33%
Others	0%

== Defeated incumbents ==
1. Leila de Lima (Liberal), ran in 2025 for House representative as Mamamayang Liberal party-list nominee and won
2. Dick Gordon (Bagumbayan), retired from politics
