= List of senators elected in the 2022 Philippine Senate election =

The 2022 Senate election in the Philippines occurred on May 9, 2022 to elect one-half of the Senate. The senators elected in 2022, together with those elected in 2019, comprise the Senate's delegation in the 19th Congress.

The proclamation of all the 12 senators was done nine days after Election Day, on May 18. four incumbents that ran successfully defended their seats, while five former and three new senators were elected.

== Manner of election ==
Senators are elected on a nationwide, at-large basis via plurality-at-large voting system. A voter has twelve votes: the voter can vote for up to twelve candidates. Votes are tallied nationwide and the twelve candidates with the highest number of votes are elected to the Senate. The Commission on Elections administers elections for the Senate, with the Senate Electoral Tribunal deciding election disputes after a Senator has taken office.

== Senators elected in 2022 ==
- Key: Boldface: incumbent, italicized: neophyte senator

Rank	Image	Senator	Party	Voted at*	Date proclaimed	Religion	Prior congressional and elective executive positions	Born
1st		Robin Padilla	PDP–Laban	Jose Panganiban, Camarines Norte	May 18, 2022	Sunni Islam	none	1969
2nd		Loren Legarda	NPC	Pandan, Antique	May 18, 2022	Roman Catholic	Member of the House of Representatives from Lone District of Antique (2019–2022), Senator (1998–2004, 2007–2019)	1960
3rd		Raffy Tulfo	Independent	Quezon City	May 18, 2022	Christianity	none	1960
4th		**Win Gatchalian**	NPC	Valenzuela	May 18, 2022	Evangelical Christianity	Senator (2016–2022), Member of the House of Representatives from Valenzuela's 1st district (2001–2004, 2013–2016), Mayor of Valenzuela (2004–2013)	1974
5th		Francis Escudero	NPC	Sorsogon City	May 18, 2022	Roman Catholic	Governor of Sorsogon (2019–2022), Senator (2007–2019), Member of the Philippine House of Representatives from Sorsogon's First District (1998–2007)	1969
6th		Mark Villar	Nacionalista	Las Piñas	May 18, 2022	Roman Catholic	Member of the Philippine House of Representatives from Las Piñas' Lone District (2010–2016)	1978
7th		Alan Peter Cayetano	Independent	Taguig	May 18, 2022	Evangelical Charismatic Christian	Member of the Philippine House of Representatives from Lone District of Taguig-Pateros (1998– 2007, 2019–2022), Senator (2007–2017), Acting Vice Mayor of Taguig (1998), Member of the Taguig Municipal Council from the 1st district (1992–1998)	1970
8th		**Juan Miguel Zubiri**	Independent	Maramag, Bukidnon	May 18, 2022	Roman Catholic	Senator (2007–2011, 2016–2022), Member of the House of Representatives from Bukidnon's 3rd district (1998–2007)	1968
9th		**Joel Villanueva**	Independent	Bocaue, Bulacan	May 18, 2022	Evangelical Christianity	Senator (2016–2022), Member of the House of Representatives from Citizens' Battle Against Corruption Party-list (2002–2010)	1975
10th		JV Ejercito	NPC	San Juan	May 18, 2022	Roman Catholic	Senator (2013–2019), Member of the Philippine House of Representatives from San Juan (2010–2013), Mayor of San Juan (2001–2010)	1969
11th		**Risa Hontiveros**	Akbayan	Quezon City	May 18, 2022	Roman Catholic	Senator (2016–2022), Member of the House of Representatives from Akbayan Party-list (2004–2010)	1966
12th		Jinggoy Estrada	PMP	San Juan	May 18, 2022	Roman Catholic	Senator (2004–2016), Mayor of San Juan (1992–2001), Vice Mayor of San Juan (1988–1992)	1963

*Senators are elected on a nationwide, at-large basis.

== See also ==
- List of representatives elected in the 2022 Philippine House of Representatives elections
