= Manny Pacquiao 2022 presidential campaign =

Bid by the Philippine Senator for head of the executive branch

- Campaign: 2022 Philippine presidential election
- Candidate: Manny Pacquiao; Senator of the Philippines (2016–2022); Sarangani's lone district representative (2010–2016); Lito Atienza; Deputy Speaker of the House of Representatives (2020–2022); Buhay party-list representative (2013–2022); Secretary of Environment and National Resources (2007–2009); Mayor of Manila (1998–2007); Vice Mayor of Manila (1992–1998); Assemblyman from Manila (1984–1986)
- Affiliation: MP3 Alliance; PDP–Laban (Pacquiao–Pimentel wing); PCM; PROMDI
- Status: Official launch: September 19, 2021; Lost election: May 9, 2022; Conceded: May 10, 2022
- Key people: Buddy Zamora (campaign manager)
- Slogan(s): Man of Destiny: For God and Country

The 2022 presidential campaign of Manny Pacquiao formally began on October 1, 2021, when Manny Pacquiao filed his candidacy for the 2022 Philippine presidential election. He has been a Senator of the Philippines from June 30, 2016 to June 30, 2022 and was previously a member of the House of Representatives, representing the Sarangani lone district.

Pacquiao is affiliated with PDP–Laban, the same party as then-incumbent Philippine President Rodrigo Duterte. He has been the acting president of PDP-Laban since 2020, but the following year, infighting within the party caused the party to split to two factions; one led by party president Alfonso Cusi who is loyal to Duterte, and another faction which sides with Pacquiao. The faction which regards Pacquiao as still party president nominated him as PDP-Laban's presidential candidate on September 19, 2021.

On October 1, he formally registered his candidacy under the Cebu-based party PROMDI. This was in accordance with the "MP3 Alliance" established by PDP-Laban under Pacquiao's faction with PROMDI, and the People's Champ Movement. Cusi's faction in response to Pacquiao's filing of his candidacy under PROMDI decided that he is no longer a member of PDP-Laban.

Pacquiao was the youngest candidate among the 10 presidential aspirants for the 2022 elections. He lost the election by a wide margin, ultimately placing third out of ten candidates with 3,663,113 votes. He later conceded to then presumptive president-elect Bongbong Marcos a day after the election. Had Pacquiao been elected, he would have been the second president from Mindanao, the first president to come from Soccsksargen, and the first boxer to become president.

== Background ==
Manny Pacquiao is best known for his feats as a professional boxer, being the only boxer to have won world championships in eight different weight divisions. He entered Philippine politics in 2007 when he unsuccessfully ran for election to the Philippine House of Representatives. He was elected to the House of Representatives in his second attempt in 2010, and in 2016 was elected as a Senator. He retired from boxing on September 29, 2021 to focus on politics.

== Campaign ==
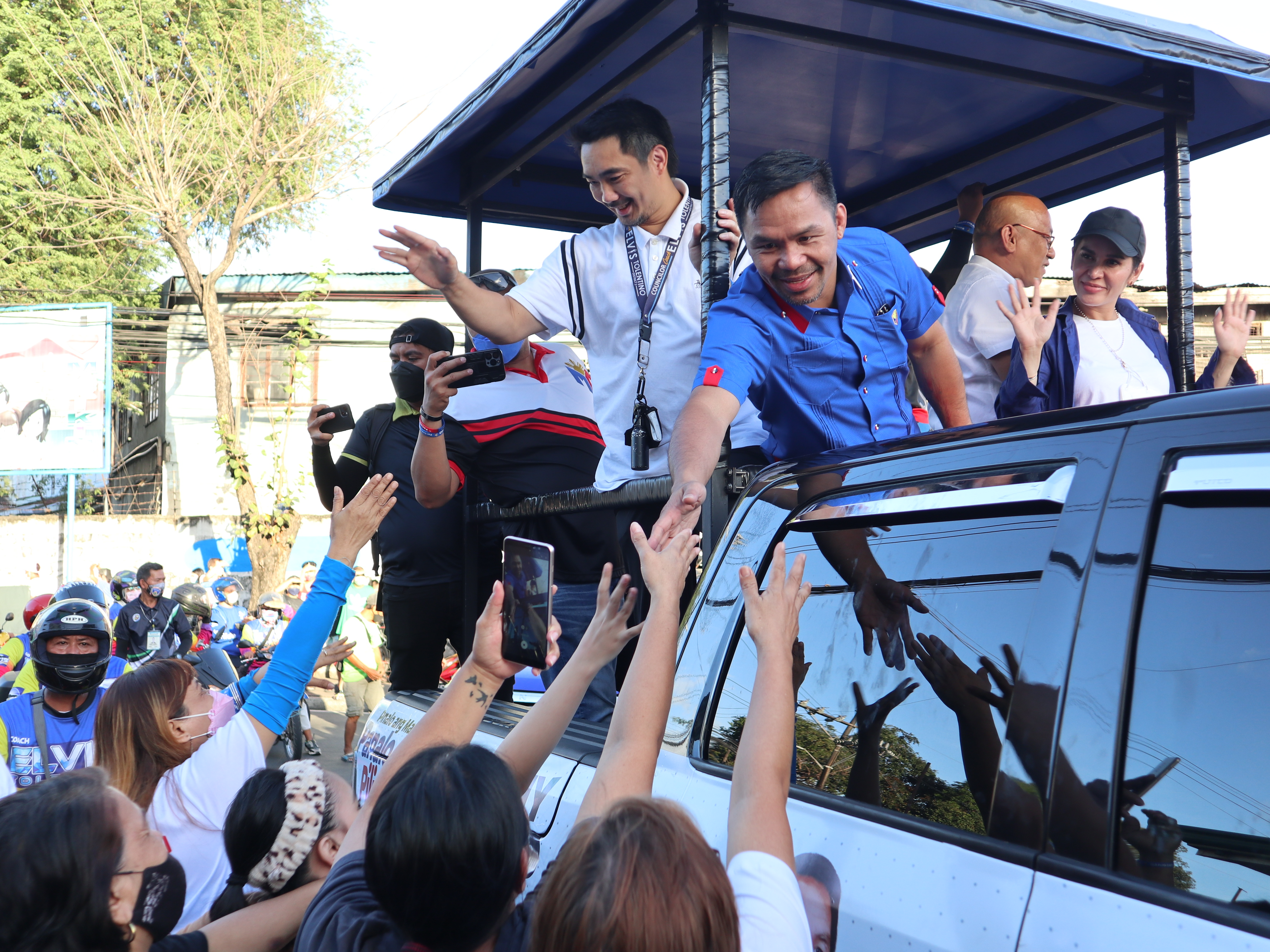
Pacquiao election motorcade in Marikina, February 2022

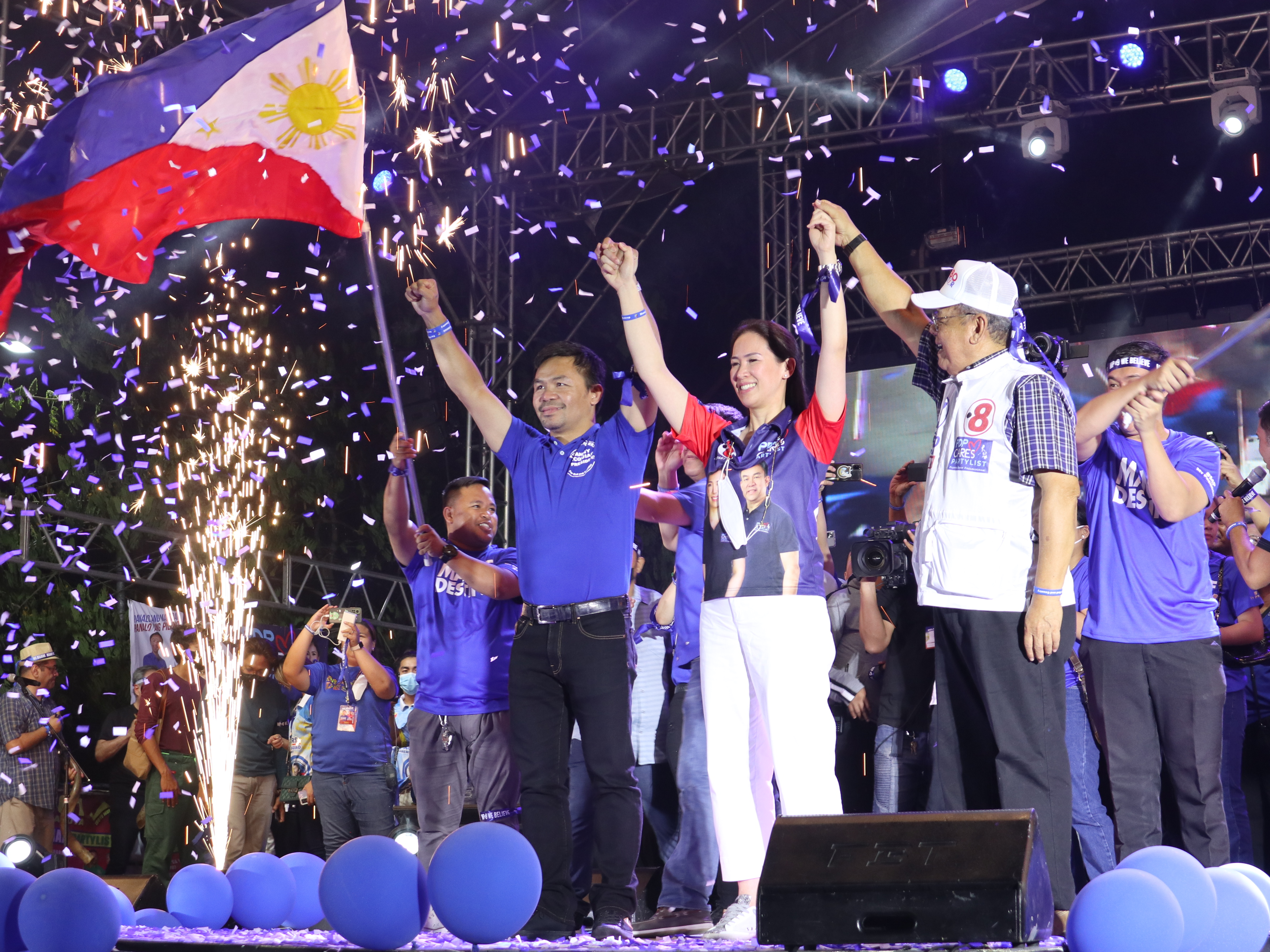
Pacquiao rally in Pinaglabanan, San Juan, April 2022

Boxing promoter Bob Arum said in June 2020 that Pacquiao told him that he'd run for president instead of defending his Senate seat in 2022. A few days later, Pacquiao denied talking to Arum about politics. A year after that, sports official and former Bacolod mayor and representative Monico Puentebella said that Pacquiao is running for president, and that he was authorized by the latter to talk about politics. In September 2021, Pacquiao said that he only have three options in politics: run for president, run for reelection in the Senate, or retire from politics altogether. On September 19, he accepted the nomination of the PDP-Laban faction led by senator Koko Pimentel. On October 1, 2021, Pacquiao filed his certificate of candidacy for the presidency in Election 2022. In his certificate of candidacy, Pacquiao is running under the Progressive Movement for the Devolution of Initiatives or PROMDI party, the political party founded by former Cebu governor Lito Osmeña for his presidential bid in 1998. According to Ron Munsayac, Pacquiao is running under the MP3 Alliance, the alliance that composed of PROMDI, PDP-Laban Pimentel-Pacquiao faction, and the People's Champ Movement, the local party Pacquiao founded. This is due to the ongoing leadership dispute in PDP-Laban.

=== Running mate ===
Pacquiao during his filing of certificate of candidacy is joined by Buhay Party-List Representative and House Deputy Speaker Lito Atienza as his vice presidential running mate. Atienza first served as an Assemblyman in the Regular Batasang Pambansa from 1984 to 1986, Vice Mayor of Manila from 1992 to 1998, Mayor of Manila from 1998 to 2007 and DENR Secretary from 2007 to 2009. Pacquiao chose Atienza to be his running mate because of his 50 years in public service, especially during his term as Mayor of Manila.

== Political views ==
Although coming from different Christian sects, Pacquiao and Atienza are both social conservatives.

Pacquiao is an Evangelical Christian and is also considered politically conservative (right-of-center to right). He previously aligned with the views of President Rodrigo Duterte and continues to support the return of the death penalty. Regarding his social conservatism, he is a strong opponent of same-sex marriage. He has, however, taken social liberal stances in the past, such as supporting wage increases.

Pacquiao's candidacy included promises to jail corrupt officials, reassess the current close relationship with China, and strive to "provide free housing to 1.9 million poor families." However, at the time of his registration as a candidate he stated, "My priority is to resolve the pandemic so we can drive the economy to recovery,"

Atienza, meanwhile, is a devout Catholic and is a known advocate for criminalization of abortion care.

== Senatorial slate ==
Pacquiao and Atienza have endorsed the following candidates for the 2022 Philippine Senate election, thus who are part of their "senatorial slate":

- Former Senate secretary and Eastern Samar governor Lutgardo Barbo (PDP–Laban)
- Former vice president Jejomar Binay (UNA)
- Former senator JV Ejercito (NPC)
- Sorsogon Governor Chiz Escudero (NPC)
- House Deputy Speaker Loren Legarda (NPC)
- Broadcaster Raffy Tulfo (Independent)
- Senator Joel Villanueva (CIBAC)
- Senate Majority Leader Migz Zubiri (Independent)
- Dropped candidates (candidate who were part of the line up but removed later):
  - Former representative Neri Colmenares (Makabayan)
  - Senator Richard J. Gordon (Bagumbayan–VNP)
  - Labor leader Elmer Labog (Makabayan)
  - Senator Win Gatchalian (NPC)

== Endorsements ==
Manny Pacquiao

Provincial officials

- Jinkee Pacquiao, Vice Governor of Sarangani (2013–2016), socialite, media personality, wife of Manny Pacquiao

Local officials

- Loreto Amante, Mayor of San Pablo, Laguna (2013–present)
- Monico Puentevella, Mayor of Bacolod (2013–2016), Bacolod's legislative district representative (2001–2010), president of the Samahang Weightlifting ng Pilipinas
- Arnie Teves, Negros Oriental's 3rd district representative (2016–present)
- Pryde Henry Teves, Mayor of Bayawan, Negros Oriental (2016–present), Negros Oriental's 3rd district representative (2007–2016), 2022 Negros Oriental gubernatorial candidate

Entertainment personalities

- Freddie Aguilar, musician
- Eddie Gutierrez, actor
- Richard Gutierrez, actor
- Ruffa Gutierrez, actress
- Sarah Lahbati, actress
- Michael Pacquiao, rapper, son of Manny Pacquiao
- Enzo Pineda, actor, model, reality talent show contestant (StarStruck)
- Annabelle Rama, actress, talent manager
- Mitoy Yonting, actor, singer, The Voice of the Philippines (season 1) winner
- Mari Kaimo, former TV journalist, actor and voice talent

Sports figures

- Floyd Mayweather Jr., American former boxer
