= Carl Balita =

Filipino entrepreneur, health worker and educator

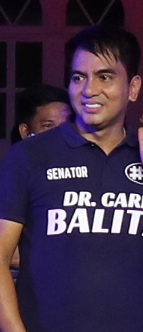
- Born: Carl Espino Balita; April 10, 1970 (age 56); Calapan, Oriental Mindoro, Philippines
- Education: University of Santo Tomas (BS); Pamantasan ng Lungsod ng Maynila (MA)
- Occupations: Entrepreneur; educator; healthcare worker; writer; broadcaster; producer
- Political party: Aksyon Demokratiko
- Children: 4
- Website: drcarlbalitareviewcenter.com

Carl Espino Balita (born April 12, 1970) is a teacher, registered nurse and midwife, producer, broadcaster, and entrepreneur. He is a former anchor of DZMM, having hosted his own show "Radyo Negosyo" for more than 20 years and was a candidate for the 2022 Philippine Senate election.

== Early life and education ==
Carl Espino Balita was born and raised in Calapan, Oriental Mindoro to a working-to-middle class family. He attended his tertiary years in the University of Santo Tomas where he graduated a nursing degree in 1991.

Although Balita could have chosen to work overseas, he decided to pursue higher learning. Since then he holds a Master of Arts in Nursing degree from the Pamantasan ng Lungsod ng Maynila (PLM), an honorary degree from Lorma Colleges in 2007, and also graduated from the Executive Program in International Management of Stanford University-National University of Singapore in 2019.

== Career ==
=== Nursing ===
Balita started his nursing career as a faculty of the Graduate School and College of Nursing of PLM where he also served various administrative and academic positions for six years. He was a clinical preceptor of the Philippine General Hospital, National Center for Mental Health, Philippine Orthopedic Center and San Lazaro Hospital. He was also the dean of Dominican College from 2004 to 2008, when he resigned from his positions at Dominican College and PLM to put up his review center business. He is currently the president of the UST Nursing Alumni Association.

During the 90s, Balita created advocacy programs for public health workers. Through one of his programs, called the Balik ‘Pinas Entrepinoy Program, he convinced more than 6,000 OFWs from Hong Kong to become entrepreneurs and come back home. The program was featured on the Asian Wall Street Journal and was commended by the Philippine government.

=== Entrepreneurship ===
Carl Balita is the Chairman of the CEB Group of Companies, which owns review centers nationwide. He founded the company in 2004. They own 200 branches across the Philippines and offer over 40 review programs for aspiring nurses, teachers, engineers, law enforcement officers, and more.

In May 2008, he established the Spotlight Artist Center, a performing arts school. He served as its director. In 2018, he put up his own micro theater. He has owned as many as 12 other businesses in his lifetime.

Balita is the Chairman of the Philippine Chamber of Commerce of Industry in Quezon City and currently its National Chairman for Human Resource Development. He is also the president of the Asian Academy for Applied Entrepreneurship.

=== Broadcasting ===
After seeing his success with the Balik ‘Pinas Entrepinoy Program, Peter Musñgi, head of ABS-CBN's Manila Radio Division, invited him to be the guest host of "Radyo Negosyo". He eventually became the full-time host for the next 20 years, first on DZMM then on Teleradyo. On the program, he would promote and provide support for those running MSMEs.

In 2022, Balita launched his own television show, "Entrepinoy Revolution" on the SMNI.

In 2024, he will host the program "Positibong Balita" on DZXL.

=== Producing ===
In 2007, Balita produced his first film "Nars" by Adolfo Alix Jr. The film was well-received by the nursing community and enjoyed a favorable run in cinemas. In 2017, he produced the film "Maestra", a film by Lemuel Lorca about teachers. The film won several awards at the Five Continents International Film Festival. In 2023, he produced another film about nurses "'Siglo ng Kalinga", which starred real-life nurses.

Balita is also a music producer. In 2007, he released a compilation album of motivational songs called "iDream" that featured Jamie Rivera, Bituin Escalante, Karylle, Luke Mejares, Raymond Lauchengco, and more. In 2023, he produced David Pomeranz's "Coming Home" tour.

=== Writing ===
Balita has written four books and has published 53 reviewers, some of which authored as well. Among the reviewers he has published include the best-selling "The Ultimate Learning Guide to Nursing Review" and "Ultimate Testing Guide to Nursing Review". In 2008, he launched "Theoretical Foundations in Nursing: The Philippine Perspective". On December 20, 2010, he published his self-help book "Prosperity", which featured a foreword from journalist Karen Davila and an epilogue from businesswoman Socorro Ramos. Another one of his books, "Entrepreneur in 12 Days", was also a best-seller.

From 2021 to 2023, Balita wrote opinion columns for BusinessMirror. From 2023 up to the present, he is writing opinion columns for The Manila Times.

=== Politics ===
Balita ran for the Senate of the Philippines, under the party and coalition Aksyon Demokratiko, the slate of Isko Moreno during the 2022 elections. Initially, he was reluctant to run, but was convinced by Moreno after he personally visited Carl's home and asked for his family's blessing to campaign. He was also inspired by the party's founder Raul Roco, an educator, and by Jimmy Galvez-Tan, one of the party's first officers and a health professional as well. His campaign focused on three platforms: Kalusugan (health), Kabuhayan (livelihood) and Karunungan (education). He, however, lost, finishing only on the 30th place, with 3,700,143 votes or 6.70 percent.

== Awards ==
- 2009 KBP Golden Dove Awards - Best Public Service Host
- 2013 UPLB Gandingan Awards - Gandingan ng Kabuhayan
- 2018 NCST Dangal ng Bayan Awards - Media Excellence Award for Radio Broadcasting
- 2019 NCST Dangal ng Bayan Awards - Media Excellence Award for Radio Broadcasting

== Personal life ==
Balita is married to a medical practitioner. Together they have four children and own the Little Lambs Kiddie Spa & Clinic. His eldest daughter Lyca is a lawyer.

In 2011, Balita lost his van to carnappers, highlighting a series of high-profile carnapping incidents in the country.

Balita had his own band, The Retromaniacs, that performed at charity events. The former members of his band included Dr. Minguita Padilla and Larry Gadon, who would both go on to run for senator during the 2022 elections.
