= Ronald dela Rosa and Bong Go 2022 presidential campaigns =

2022 presidential campaign

- Campaign: 2022 Philippine presidential election
- Candidate: Ronald dela Rosa; Senator of the Philippines (2019 – present); Chief of the Philippine National Police (2016 – 2018) Bong Go; Senator of the Philippines (2019 – present); Special Assistant to the President (2016 – 2018)
- Affiliation: Pederalismo ng Dugong Dakilang Samahan; PDP–Laban (Duterte-Cusi faction)
- Status: Official launch: October 8, 2021 (as Dela Rosa candidacy); November 13, 2021 (Bong Go candidacy); Withdrawal: December 14, 2021
- Key people: Ronald dela Rosa; Rodrigo Duterte; Sara Duterte (Note: Endorsed as President Rodrigo Duterte as Go's vice president candidate, officially part of Bongbong Marcos' ticket)

The party of President Rodrigo Duterte, PDP–Laban, had two candidates to succeed the head executive. These were senators Ronald "Bato" dela Rosa and Christopher "Bong" Go who had non-simultaneous presidential campaigns.

Dela Rosa's campaign was the first which was formalized on October 8, 2021, when dela Rosa filed his certificate of candidacy for the 2022 Philippine presidential election, with Go as his vice president candidate. Both originally filed their candidacies under PDP-Laban. Dela Rosa is a former chief of the Philippine National Police, serving as an enforcer of the national war on drugs campaign of President Rodrigo Duterte. However, both dela Rosa and Go withdrew their original candidacies on November 13.

Go later launched a presidential campaign which was formalized on November 13, 2021, when he substituted the candidacy of Grepor Belgica of the Pederalismo ng Dugong Dakilang Samahan for the 2022 Philippine presidential election. He withdrew his presidential bid on December 14, 2021.

== Background ==
=== Ronald Dela Rosa candidacy ===
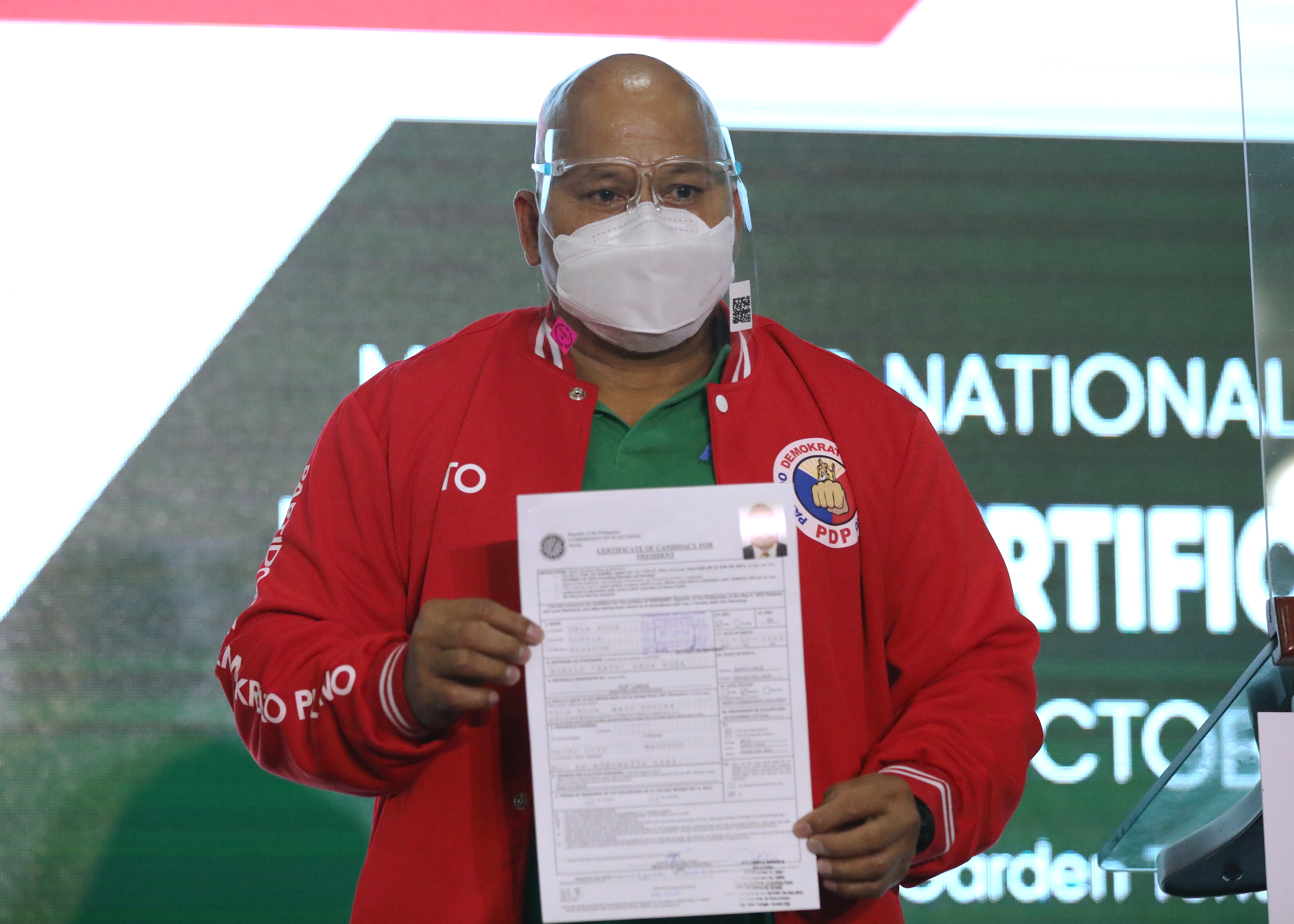
Dela Rosa filed his certificate of candidacy on October 8

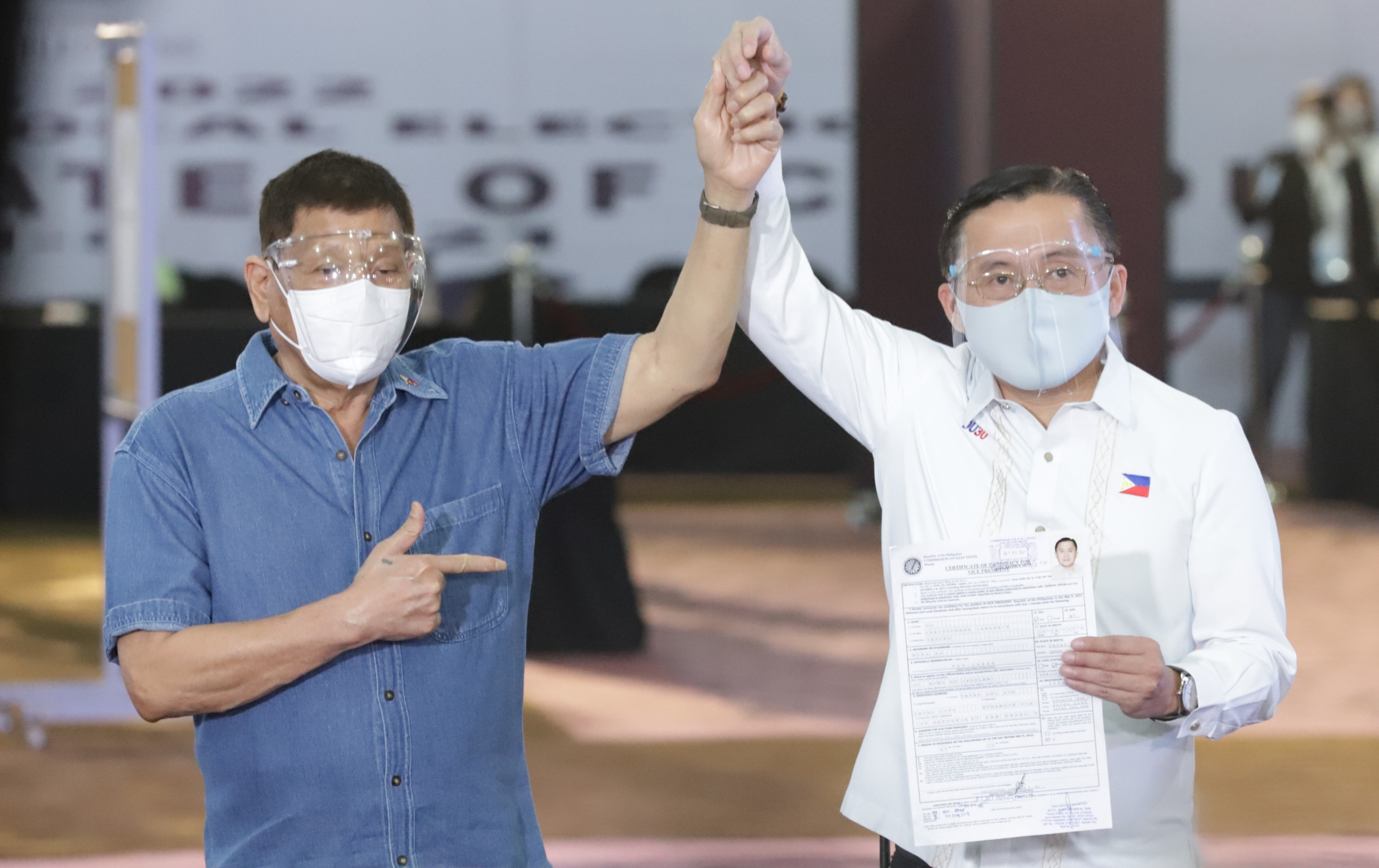
Go filed his certificate of candidacy for vice president on October 2

PDP–Laban has previously nominated Go to be their presidential candidate, with incumbent Philippine President Rodrigo Duterte as their candidate for vice president. However Rodrigo Duterte did not push through his vice presidential bid, and Go filed a certificate of candidacy for the position of vice president instead. Dela Rosa's bid was unexpected, but he insist that this has been a plan of PDP–Laban but was kept a secret as part of his party's "strategy". Dela Rosa was also a former chief of the Philippine National Police, serving as an enforcer of the national war on drugs campaign of President Rodrigo Duterte.

There has been clamor for President Duterte's daughter, Sara Duterte who is not a member of PDP–Laban to run for president. Dela Rosa has expressed openness to the possibility of his candidacy for being substituted for the younger Duterte, if PDP–Laban decides to do so.

Following directives of his party, Dela Rosa withdrew his candidacy on November 13, 2021.

=== Bong Go's candidacy and campaign ===
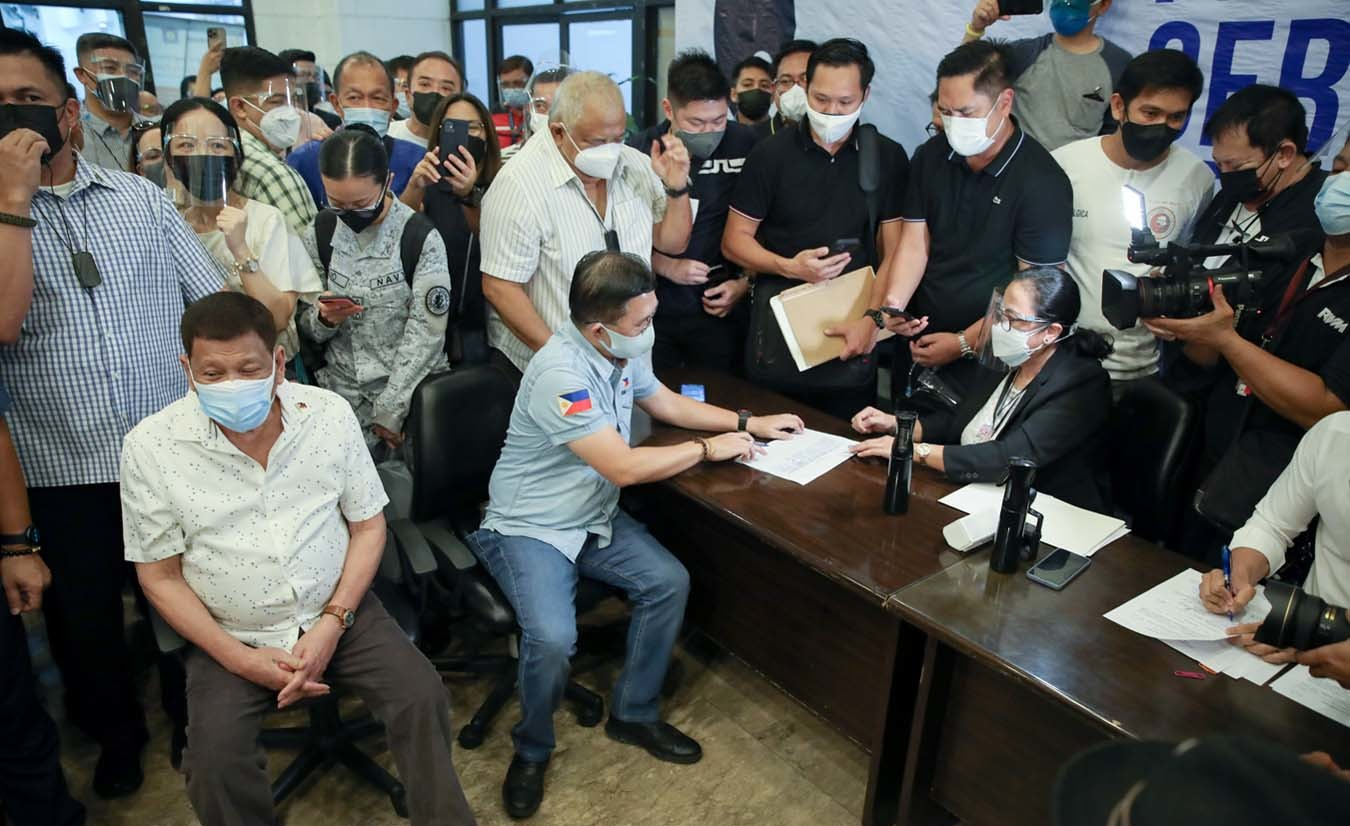
Go, accompanied by President Duterte, filed his candidacy for president on November 13 substituting Grepor Belgica.

Dela Rosa's original vice president candidate, Bong Go also withdrew his bid for the vice presidency on November 13, 2021. Go was running for president instead under the Pederalismo ng Dugong Dakilang Samahan (PDDS) party. He substituted the candidacy of Grepor Belgica, father of Greco Belgica. Go explained that he withdrew his bid to run for vice president, to avoid complicating the campaign of Sara Duterte who launched her own vice president bid under Lakas–CMD. While he is formally running under a different party, he vowed to continue to the plans of incumbent President Duterte's administration.

Go has been touted to run for president prior to the official filing of candidacies in October 2021. Go has repeatedly denied that he would run for president In August 2021, Go declared that he would contest in the presidential elections if President Duterte would be his vice president candidate.

The faction of PDP–Laban led by Alfonso Cusi allowed Go to run under a different party as a bid to avoid complication since the party is under a leadership dispute. The other faction is led by Manny Pacquiao and Koko Pimentel who disputed the legitimacy of Cusi's faction as representatives of the party. Cusi's side anticipate that there would be legal issues had Go substituted the candidacy of Ronald dela Rosa as president if the COMELEC ruled dela Rosa's candidacy as invalid. Cusi's PDP-Laban has adopted and endorse Go as their presidential candidate for the 2022 election.

Incumbent President Rodrigo Duterte reportedly would file his candidacy for vice president on November 15, 2021, but filed his candidacy for senator instead. The Go campaign has no formal vice president candidate. President Rodrigo Duterte has endorsed his daughter Sara Duterte as Go's vice presidential candidate.

==== Go's withdrawal ====
Go announced his intention to withdraw his candidacy on November 30, 2021, leaving his party PDP–Laban with no formal candidate for the presidency. Go said he would not want President Duterte to be "trapped", for him to contribute to the chief executive's problems and also added that his family was also against his bid. PDP–Laban on their part said they are "keeping all options open" in regards to their plan for the 2022 elections following Go's withdrawal.

On December 14, 2021, two weeks after he announced his intention to withdraw, Go formally withdrew his candidacy by personally lodging it at the COMELEC's main office in Manila.

== Senatorial slate ==
The faction of PDP–Laban under Alfonso Cusi, has announced the following as being part of their senatorial slate. The list was announced prior to Go's filing of candidacy for presidency. The PDP-Laban Cusi Faction slate called "Tuloy ang Pagbabago."

The slogan is "MAPAPALACAS BAYANG PILIPINAS" It is an acronym of the candidates' names, with MA standing for Marcoleta, PA standing for Panelo, PA standing for Padilla, LA standing for Langit, CAS Standing for Castriciones, B is standing for Belgica and P standing for Pimentel-Naik.

- John Castriciones, former Agrarian Reform Secretary
- Gregorio Honasan, secretary of information and communications technology
- Rey Langit, broadcaster
- Rodante Marcoleta, House Deputy Speaker
- Robin Padilla, actor
- Salvador Panelo, Chief presidential legal counsel
- Astravel Pimentel-Naik, Commission on Filipinos Overseas Undersecretary
- Mark Villar (Nacionalista), former Public Works and Highways Secretary

Additionally, these people will run under the same party as Go.

- Greco Belgica, former Presidential Anti-Corruption Commission chairman

Incumbent president of the Philippines Rodrigo Duterte was set to run for senator under the same party as Go, but withdrew his candidacy on December 14.
