= Francis Leo Marcos =

Filipino internet personality (born 1979)

- Born: Norman Mangusin; September 29, 1979 (age 47); Philippines
- Occupations: Businessman; Philanthropist
- Known for: Mayaman Challenge; claimed familial ties to the Marcos family; 2022 Senate election bid
- Spouse: Mayu Murakami

YouTube information
- Channel: FLM COMEBACK
- Years active: 2020 (Note: 2022 for current channel)–present
- Genre: Vlog
- Subscribers: 252 thousand
- Views: 11.95 million
- Last updated: 3 October 2025

Norman Mangusin (born September 29, 1979), who is more known as Francis Leo Marcos or FLM and colloquially Kulaong is a Filipino internet personality who falsely claimed to be a son of former President of the Philippines Ferdinand Marcos. He is known for popularizing the "Mayaman Challenge", which encouraged people to donate to those affected by COVID-19 pandemic-related quarantines. He ran for the 2022 Philippine Senate election.

== Background ==
According to his own account, Francis Leo Marcos began his philanthropic work in 2007, long before it gained attention on social media. He leads the Optimum Eye Care Program, which provides eyeglasses to individuals who cannot afford them.

Marcos came to wider public attention when he started a trend on Facebook called the "Mayaman Challenge" urging the rich to give donations to people affected by the enhanced community quarantine imposed amidst the COVID-19 pandemic. Marcos posted a video about the challenge on Facebook which garnered 9 million views before it was taken down. He then created his own YouTube channel for the challenge.

== Political career ==
=== 2013 election ===
Marcos attempted to run for senator in the 2013 election under the name Francis Leo Marcos, but his candidacy was rejected since he was two years short of fulfilling the 35 years of age requirement to run for the position.

=== 2022 election ===
Marcos ran again for senator in the 2022 election. This is despite a petition to declare him a nuisance candidate. The Commission on Elections (COMELEC) ruled that his candidacy was valid and that he was capable of launching a campaign given the size of the social media following he had already garnered at the time. However, he lost by receiving only 4.5 million votes, placing 27th and short of the 12 seats up for election.

=== 2025 election ===
==== Senate bid ====
He would go on to run once again for senator in the 2025 election. As before, a petition to declare him as a nuisance candidate was filed again. In this instance, the COMELEC ruled him as a nuisance candidate, disqualifying him. The Supreme Court issued a Temporary Restraining Order (TRO) against the COMELEC ruling, but Marcos decided to continue his withdrawal of his candidacy. The SC demanded Marcos to explain his decision. On January 19, 2026, the Supreme Court found Marcos guilty of indirect contempt and fined him ₱30,000, ruling that he had abused court processes by withdrawing his candidacy after obtaining a temporary restraining order against the Commission on Elections' nuisance-candidate ruling.

==== LPGMA chairmanship claim ====
During the 2025 election campaign period, Marcos endorsed the LPG Marketers Association (LPGMA) Party List, and would later claim he is the chairman of the said party. The group came out with an official statement indicating that Marcos is not connected with LPGMA, and his endorsement was a personal choice. LPGMA chairman, former Congressman Arnel Ty, also denied that Marcos is the chairman.

== Legal issues ==
Marcos is facing multiple charges against him. He has maintained that he is innocent and the charges against him are motivated by people who took offense to his Mayaman Challenge. The NBI filed cases against Mangusin for violating Anti-Alias Law and Passport Law.

=== Violation of RA 8050 Philippine Optometry Law ===
In 2020, Marcos was arrested by the National Bureau of Investigation (NBI) for violating the Revised Optometry Law of 1995 by distributing eyeglasses for his eyecare program allegedly without the sanction of the Philippine Association of Optometry. Mangusin believes that the action made against him constitutes persecution. He also denied the child trafficking charges filed against him by the NBI in 2006 for recruiting children.

=== Human trafficking and prostitution ===
Marcos also faced additional complaints of Violence Against Women and Children (VAWC) and estafa, as he recruited 6 women to work as "entertainers" in Cyprus and Turkey, only to end up working as prostitutes. In March 14, 2022, the Court of Appeals affirmed the ruling of two lower courts in denying the bail motion of Marcos over his qualified human trafficking case.

=== Unauthorized police uniform use ===
On February 24, 2026, Marcos was arrested by operatives at the Sheraton Manila Hotel in Pasay, a week after CIDG launched probe into his unauthorized use of police uniform.

== Personal life ==
Marcos was born on September 29, 1979. There are conflicting information regarding his birthplace. He is reportedly born in Baguio, in Bulakan, Bulacan, or in Tarangnan, Samar He goes by the full name of Francis Leo Antonio Marcos and claims to be associated with the Marcos political family which had President Ferdinand Marcos as its member.

He stated that his mother revealed to him that he is related to the Marcoses at age 17. Imelda Marcos, the former First Lady, refuted the claim in 2020, stating that Francis Leo Marcos is not connected in any way to her family. According to the National Bureau of Investigation, his real name is Norman Mangusin.

He is married to Mayu Murakami.
