= List of senators elected in the 2019 Philippine Senate election =

The 2019 Senate election in the Philippines occurred on May 13, 2019 to elect one-half of the Senate. The senators elected in 2019, together with those elected in 2016, comprise the Senate's delegation in the 18th Congress.

The proclamation of all the 12 senators was done nine days after Election Day, on May 22. five incumbents that ran successfully defended their seats, while three former and four new senators were elected.

== Manner of election ==
Senators are elected on a nationwide, at-large basis via plurality-at-large voting system. A voter has twelve votes: the voter can vote for up to twelve candidates. Votes are tallied nationwide and the twelve candidates with the highest number of votes are elected to the Senate. The Commission on Elections administers elections for the Senate, with the Senate Electoral Tribunal deciding election disputes after a Senator has taken office.

== Senators elected in 2019 ==
- Key: Boldface: incumbent, italicized: neophyte senator

Place	Image	Senator	Party	Voted at*	Date proclaimed	Religion	Prior congressional and elective executive positions	Born
1st		**Cynthia Villar**	Nacionalista	Las Piñas	May 22, 2019	Roman Catholicism	Senator (2013–2019), Member of the Philippine House of Representatives from Las Piñas' Lone District (2001–2010)	1950
2nd		**Grace Poe**	Independent	San Juan	May 22, 2019	Roman Catholicism	Senator (2013–2019)	1968
3rd		Bong Go	PDP–Laban	Davao City	May 22, 2019		none	1974
4th		Pia Cayetano	Nacionalista	Taguig	May 22, 2019	Evangelical Christianity	Senator (2004–2016), Member of the Philippine House of Representatives from Taguig-Pateros's 2nd District (2016–2019)	1966
5th		Ronald dela Rosa	PDP–Laban	Santa Cruz, Davao del Sur	May 22, 2019	Roman Catholicism	none	1962
6th		**Sonny Angara**	LDP	Baler, Aurora	May 22, 2019	Roman Catholicism	Senator (2013–2019), Member of the Philippine House of Representatives from Aurora's Lone District (2004–2013)	1972
7th		Lito Lapid	NPC	Porac, Pampanga	May 22, 2019	Roman Catholicism	Senator (2004–2016), Governor of Pampanga (1995–2004), Vice Governor of Pampanga (1992–1995)	1955
8th		Imee Marcos	Nacionalista	Batac, Ilocos Norte	May 22, 2019	Roman Catholicism	Governor of Ilocos Norte (2010–2019), Member of the Philippine House of Representatives from Ilocos Norte's 2nd District (1998–2007)	1955
9th		Francis Tolentino	PDP–Laban	Tagaytay, Cavite	May 22, 2019		Mayor of Tagaytay (1995–2004)	1960
10th		**Koko Pimentel**	PDP–Laban	Cagayan de Oro	May 22, 2019	Roman Catholicism	Senator (2007–2013, 2013–2019)	1964
11th		Bong Revilla	Lakas	Bacoor, Cavite	May 22, 2019	Roman Catholicism	Senator (2004–2016), Governor of Cavite (1998–2001), Vice Governor of Cavite (1995–1998)	1966
12th		**Nancy Binay**	UNA	Makati City	May 22, 2019	Roman Catholicism	Senator (2013–2019)	1973

*Senators are elected on a nationwide, at-large basis.
