= List of senators elected in the 2016 Philippine Senate election =

The 2016 Senate election in the Philippines occurred on May 9, 2016 to elect one-half of the Senate. The senators elected in 2016, together with those elected in 2013, comprise the Senate's delegation in the 17th Congress.

The proclamation of all the 12 senators was done ten days after Election Day, on May 19. three incumbents that ran successfully defended their seats, while four former and five new senators were elected.

== Manner of election ==
Senators are elected on a nationwide, at-large basis via plurality-at-large voting system. A voter has twelve votes: the voter can vote for up to twelve candidates. Votes are tallied nationwide and the twelve candidates with the highest number of votes are elected to the Senate. The Commission on Elections administers elections for the Senate, with the Senate Electoral Tribunal deciding election disputes after a Senator has taken office.

== Senators elected in 2016 ==
- Key: Boldface: incumbent, italicized: neophyte senator

Rank	Image	Senator	Party	Voted at*	Date proclaimed	Religion	Prior congressional and elective executive positions	Born
1st		**Franklin Drilon**	Liberal	Iloilo City	May 19, 2016	Roman Catholicism	Senator (1995–2007, 2010–2016; Senate President, 2000, 2001–2006, 2013–2016)	1945
2nd		Joel Villanueva	CIBAC	Bocaue, Bulacan	May 19, 2016	Evangelical Christianity	Member of the House of Representatives from Citizens' Battle Against Corruption Party-list (2002–2010)	1975
3rd		**Tito Sotto**	NPC	Quezon City	May 19, 2016	Roman Catholicism	Senator (1992–2004, 2010–2016), Vice Mayor of Quezon City (1988–1992)	1948
4th		Panfilo Lacson	Independent	Imus, Cavite	May 19, 2016	Roman Catholicism	Senator (2001–2013)	1948
5th		Dick Gordon	Independent	Olongapo City	May 19, 2016	Roman Catholicism	Senator (2004–2010), Mayor of Olongapo (1980–1986, 1988–1993)	1945
6th		Juan Miguel Zubiri	Independent	Malaybalay City, Bukidnon	May 19, 2016	Roman Catholicism	Senator (2007–2011), Member of the House of Representatives from Bukidnon's 3rd district (1998–2007)	1968
7th		Manny Pacquiao	UNA	Kiamba, Sarangani	May 19, 2016	Evangelical Christianity	Member of the House of Representatives from Sarangani's lone district (2010–2016)	1978
8th		Kiko Pangilinan	Liberal	Quezon City	May 19, 2016	Evangelical Christianity	Senator (2001–2013)	1963
9th		Risa Hontiveros	Akbayan	Manila	May 19, 2016	Roman Catholicism	Member of the House of Representatives from Akbayan Party-list (1995–2007)	1966
10th		Win Gatchalian	NPC	Valenzuela City	May 19, 2016	Evangelical Christianity	Member of the House of Representatives from Valenzuela's 1st district (2001–2004, 2013–2016), Mayor of Valenzuela (2004–2013)	1974
11th		**Ralph Recto**	Liberal	Lipa City, Batangas	May 19, 2016	Roman Catholicism	Senator (2001–2007, 2010–2016), Member of the House of Representatives from Batangas 4th district (1992–2001)	1964
12th		Leila de Lima	Liberal	Iriga City, Camarines Sur	May 19, 2016	Roman Catholicism	none	1959

*Senators are elected on a nationwide, at-large basis.

== See also ==
- List of representatives elected in the Philippine House of Representatives elections, 2016
