= Lutgardo Barbo =

Former governor of Eastern Samar

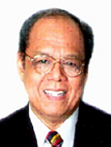

Governor of Eastern Samar
- In office March 16, 1986 – June 30, 1998
- Vice Governor: Marcelino Libanan (1992–1995)
- Preceded by: Fredrico Mengote
- Succeeded by: Ruperto Ambil Jr.

19th Secretary of the Senate of the Philippines
- In office November 2000 – July 23, 2001
- Preceded by: Oscar Yabes
- Succeeded by: Oscar Yabes
- In office July 25, 2016 – May 29, 2018
- Preceded by: Oscar Yabes
- Succeeded by: Myra Marie Villarica

Personal details
- Born: Lutgardo Boco Barbo; October 1, 1945 (age 81) Llorente, Samar, Philippines
- Other political affiliations: Liberal; PDP-LABAN
- Occupation: Lecturer, Politician

Lutgardo "Lutz" Boco Barbo (born October 1, 1945) is a lawyer and politician who served as governor of Eastern Samar from 1986 to 1998. He also served as the senate secretary of Senator Aquilino Pimentel Jr. from 2000 to 2001 and his son Senator Koko Pimentel until 2016.

Barbo worked at a law firm in Quezon City beginning in the 1970s. He was detained and tortured by the military in 1980 during the martial law regime under President Ferdinand Marcos.

In 2022, he ran for Senator, in the slate of Manny Pacquiao with PDP-Laban. He got 48th overall, being elected as the vice-chairman for PDP-Laban shortly after the elections.

== Early life and early career ==
He was born on October 1, 1945, in Llorente, Eastern Samar (then part of undivided Samar). He was originally a part of the Quisumbing, Capers, Alcantara & Mosqueda Law Office, with the earliest report coming from 1979.

=== Detainment during martial law ===
In 1980, Barbo was detained and tortured by the military during the martial law regime of Ferdinand Marcos after his name was found in the diary of his friend Victor Lovely.

== Career ==
=== Governor and secretary ===
Following Marcos's removal from office, Lutgardo Barbo had served as the governor of Eastern Samar for four terms from 1986 to 1998. Since 2000, (Note: Until an unknown time.) he was the senate secretary of Aquilino Pimentel Jr. On December 7, 2000, he was the case caller for the impeachment of Joseph Estrada out of 21 senator judges, 11 prosecutors, and three defense lawyers. Until 2016, Barbo was the secretary for the senator Koko Pimentel, and as a senate secretary until 2018.

=== 2022 Senate run ===
He ran for the Senate of the Philippines, joining the slate of former senator and boxer Manny Pacquiao, with the political party PDP-Laban. He ended up getting 48th overall, with 749,472 votes, roughly 1.35% of the overall votes. After the election, in August 2022, Barbo was elected as the vice-chairman for the Pacquiao-Pimentel Faction of the PDP-Laban party.

== Bibliography ==
- Philippines (1979). Official Gazette.
- Barreveld, Dirk J. (2001). Philippine President Estada Impeached!: How the President of the World's 13th Most Populous Country Stumbles Over His Mistresses, a Chinese Conspiracy and the Garbage of His Capital. iUniverse. ISBN 978-0-595-18437-8.
- Uriarte, Filemon A. Jr.; Uriarte, Filemon A. (2008). Solid Waste Management: Principles and Practices : an Introduction to the Basic Functional Elements of Solid Waste Management, with Special Emphasis on the Needs of Developing Countries. UP Press. ISBN 978-971-542-557-5.
