= PDP–Laban (2021) =

Breakaway political party faction in the Philippines

- President: Manny Pacquiao
- Chairperson: Koko Pimentel
- Founded: 2021 (Note: The organization considers itself as the legitimate PDP–Laban of the 1980s. This is contrary the COMELEC and Supreme Court rulings issued in 2022 and 2025 respectively. The rival faction was led by Alfonso Cusi at the time of the schism in 2021.)
- Merger of: PDP and Laban
- Split from: PDP–Laban (Cusi-Legitimate Faction)
- Political position: Centre-left

The Partido Demokratiko Pilipino–Lakas ng Bayan (PDP–Laban|Pimentel Faction) is faction of the PDP–Laban political party in the Philippines. The splinter faction is led by Koko Pimentel and considers itself as the original PDP-Laban which was formed in 1983 via the merger of Partido Demokratiko Pilipino with Lakas ng Bayan.

A dispute within the PDP–Laban, the ruling party of the Philippines, began on March 12, 2021 when Senator Manny Pacquiao (who was named the party's interim president in December 2020) began to criticize President Rodrigo Duterte and the government regarding the dispute in the South China Sea, alleged corruption in the government agencies under the Duterte administration, the government handling of the COVID-19 pandemic and the endorsement of the candidates for the 2022 presidential election, leading to the creation of two factions.

On July 17, a national assembly was held where Alfonso Cusi was elected as party's president, succeeding Pacquiao. Before the dispute, Duterte and Pacquiao were longtime allies since they are both affiliated with the party.

The COMELEC ruled that the Cusi-led faction is the legitimate part on May 6, 2022. The Supreme Court affirmed this ruling in July 2025.

== Background ==
2nd Logo

The original PDP–Laban was established by Nene Pimentel as the Partido Demokratiko Pilipino (PDP) on February 6, 1982. It merged with the 1978-founded Lakas ng Bayan in July 1982. The party which became known as PDP–Laban positioned itself as an opposition to the administration of President Ferdinand Marcos and his martial law.

For the 2016 Philippine presidential election, PDP-Laban fielded Rodrigo Duterte as its candidate. Duterte was elected as president. Manny Pacquiao is among the members of PDP-Laban who was teased by Duterte himself to be his potential successor.

In June 2020, American boxing promoter Bob Arum said that Senator Manny Pacquiao confided to him that he will run for president in 2022. Pacquiao later denied talking about politics with Arum. On December 3, 2020, Pacquiao was elected as party president of PDP–Laban, of which President Rodrigo Duterte is the party chairman. On July 17, 2021, a national assembly was held where Alfonso Cusi was elected as party's president, succeeding Pacquiao. Duterte rebuked Pimentel for his role on elevating Pacquiao as party president.

On May 3, 2021, when Pacquiao was asked about his plans of running for President, he replied "for now, let's not think about that." Koko Pimentel backed Pacquiao against the other rival faction which is more aligned to President Duterte who he called as hijackers.

== History ==
=== Schism ===
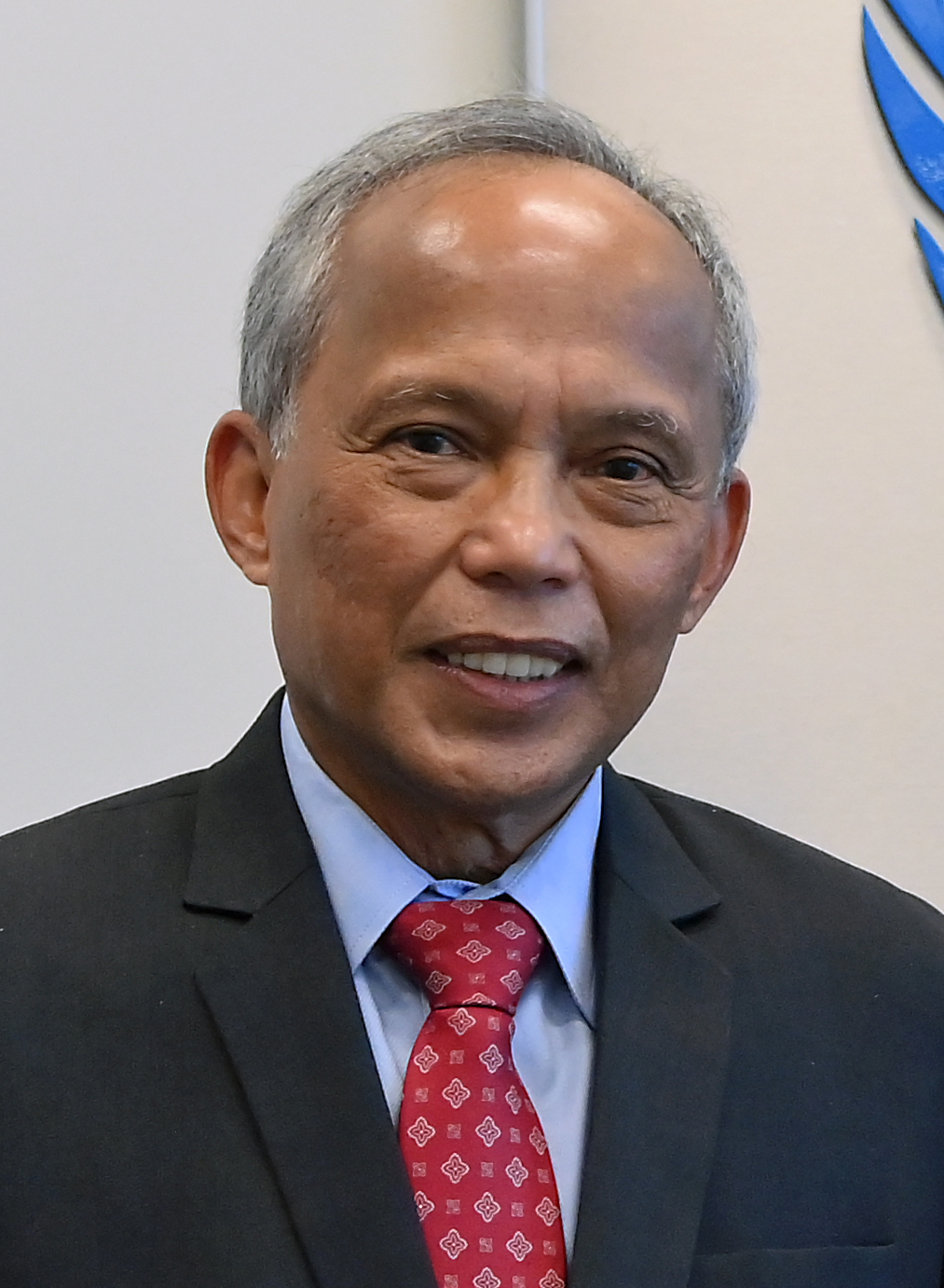
Secretary of Energy Alfonso Cusi also intervened by criticizing Pacquiao for his actions against Duterte and his government.

On March 12, 2021, Senator Manny Pacquiao warned PDP–Laban party members to stop moves that are "unauthorized" by the party, following the partylist's officers and members signing a resolution encouraging Duterte to run for vice president. On March 31, 2021, Pacquiao told Energy Secretary Alfonso Cusi not to "divide" and "poison" the minds of the party members amidst talks of the party's lineup for the 2022 elections. The former added that he would not retract his statement that Cusi is prioritising politics over the COVID-19 pandemic.

Pacquiao also intervened regarding the disputes in the South China Sea. On May 3, 2021, Pacquiao said that Duterte's stance against China about the West Philippine Sea weakened following the 2016 elections, describing his response to them as "lacking." Pacquiao also stated that Duterte must fulfill his promise to "ride a jetski" and raise the country's flag there. On May 27, the PDP–Laban said that Pacquiao ordered its members not to attend the party assembly organized by Cusi. On May 30, Pacquiao requested a meeting with Duterte to "set the agenda for the legitimate national council meeting." On May 31, PDP–Laban voted for a resolution that urged Duterte to run as vice president in 2022 presidential elections. Duterte called on the party to "stand together and remain united" amidst the approaching 2022 elections.

On June 2, in a Senate hearing regarding the Luzon blackouts, Pacquiao slammed Cusi for focusing on the PDP–Laban dispute instead of addressing the rotational blackouts in Luzon. On June 3, Pacquiao criticized Cusi for a series of power outages in Luzon attributed to the hot weather which increased demand for electricity power. Cusi, in a press briefing in Malacañang, asserted that the power supply is normal and sufficient. On June 7, 2021, on his interview with Karen Davila of ABS-CBN News, Pacquiao said to the supporters of Sara Duterte: "let's give others a chance." He added that being president requires being "anointed by God" and, despite the dispute with Duterte, he will not leave PDP–Laban. On June 8, 2021, Duterte said that Pacquiao should "study first" before making comments regarding Duterte's foreign policy over China. On July 2, Senate President Tito Sotto believed that Senator Koko Pimentel had the authority to stop the dispute within the PDP-Laban, which was founded by Pimentel's father, late Senate President Aquilino Pimentel Jr. Former Senator Antonio Trillanes said that the PDP-Laban was just "playing" Pacquiao, and also accused Duterte of "controlling the party."

On July 7, Duterte said that Pacquiao shared similarities with Antonio Trillanes, Duterte's longtime opponent. On July 9, PDP–Laban Vice Chairman Cusi, along with party deputy Secretary General Melvin Matibag and membership committee head Astra Naik, were reportedly expelled from the party for "showing allegiance to a political party apart from PDP-Laban". Duterte did not recognize the expulsion of Cusi.

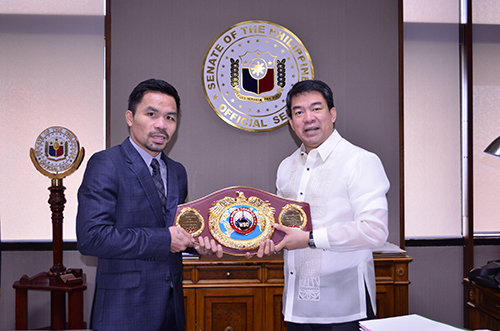
Pimentel (right) holding Pacquiao's World Boxing Organization Welterweight Championship belt in 2016.

On July 10, Senator Koko Pimentel said that in order to solve the dispute within the ruling party, he wanted Cusi to reveal his faction's "hidden" presidential bet for the 2022 elections. On July 13, Cusi said that the party's endorsement of Davao City Mayor Sara Duterte (daughter of Rodrigo Duterte) for the presidential race was "possible." Cusi added that Pacquiao may face expulsion from the party following the latter's accusations of government corruption under the Duterte administration. Cusi asserted that there was no "power grab" within the party. On July 14, Presidential spokesperson Harry Roque stated that the party will be reduced to a "jeepney-sized" group if they oust Duterte from his post as chairman. His statement was condemned by Pimentel. On July 15, Pimentel called the upcoming July 17 party's assembly illegitimate even if Duterte attends it. Roque said that Duterte recognized the party leadership of Cusi but also recognized that the party belonged to the Pimentels. However, PDP-Laban acting secretary general Melvin Matibag said that Koko Pimentel should not claim the party by himself. Lawyer Romulo Macalintal said that the attendance of Duterte in the general assembly will not end the rift between two factions led by Pacquiao and Cusi. On July 16, Cusi called for unity and the end of hostilities within the party. Pacquiao slammed evangelist Apollo Quiboloy for making claims against the former regarding the purported P3.5 billion project in Sarangani.

On July 17, in a national assembly, Cusi was elected as the party's president. Pimentel was also ousted as the party's executive vice chairman on the same day. Duterte said that the party was "asleep for hundred years" until he ran for president in 2016. He also slammed Pimentel, for the first time since his presidency, for the rift within the party caused by the latter's naming Pacquiao as party president in December 2020.

On July 18, Monico Puentevella, a longtime friend of Pacquiao, demanded Duterte to apologize to Pacquiao for the former's tirade against him, as Pacquiao has never thrown a verbal insult against the president. Malacañang Palace said that Duterte has no reason to apologize to him. On July 19, Pimentel said that he is still an ally of Duterte despite the latter's tirade against him. On July 20, Senator Francis Tolentino urged the Cusi faction to reach out to Pacquiao and Pimentel. Deputy Speaker Rufus Rodriguez called on the critics of Pacquiao to stop attacking him.

On August 12, PDP-Laban Secretary General Melvin Matibag of the Cusi faction said that Pacquiao could face expulsion over the latter's alleged move to convert his local party, the People's Champ Movement, into a national party. Pimentel branded the Cusi faction as having issued a "bluff" over the faction's warning to expel Pacquiao from the party. On August 13, the ruling party announced that they are planning to resolve the complaint of the "disloyalty" of Pacquiao before the filing of certificate of candidacy in October 2021.

On August 29, according to PDP-Laban Executive Director Ron Munsayac, Senator Koko Pimentel was elected as the party's chairman, replacing Duterte. However, Palace spokesman Harry Roque said that Duterte believed he remained as the party chairman. On August 31, PDP-Laban Vice Chairperson Lutgardo Barbo said that most of the party members were disappointed and "disgusted" at the leadership of Rodrigo Duterte. The Pacquiao faction expressed confidence that their faction's membership number would grow compared to that of the rival faction led by Cusi.

On September 7, Matibag and Cusi filed a petition to the Commission on Elections (COMELEC) to "declare all the actions and representations of Senators Koko Pimentel and Manny Pacquiao to be illegal and not sanctioned by the PDP-Laban party." On September 14, Pacquiao filed a ₱100 million cyberlibel complaint against Quiboloy for making claims regarding the former's "unfinished" ₱3.5 billion project in Sarangani. Quiboloy's legal counsel responded by saying that the libel cases filed by Pacquiao are "retaliatory and political in nature".

On November 9, 2021, Pacquiao met personally with Duterte for the first time since the rift. According to Pacquiao's camp, the meeting was about the discussion of "Mindanao development, specifically infrastructure and [the] power industry." Bong Go said that no politics were discussed but only a "renewal of friendship."

==== PDP–Laban's campaign for the 2022 elections ====
Amid the escalating conflict between the two factions, the PDP–Laban Cusi faction endorsed Senator Bong Go and President Rodrigo Duterte as standard bearers for the 2022 presidential election. On August 30, 2021, Go declined the party's endorsement for him to run as president due to a lack of interest in said position. On August 24, 2021, Duterte accepted the endorsement by PDP-Laban to run for vice president, citing his agreement to "make the sacrifice and heed the clamor of the people." A couple of weeks later, the PDP-Laban Cusi faction formally nominated Duterte for vice president.

On September 19, nearly a month after Duterte's acceptance towards the nomination of vice president in the upcoming election, the Pimentel-led PDP-Laban faction officially and formally nominated Manny Pacquiao to be their candidate for president in the upcoming election, to which Pacquiao would accept. On October 3, the Cusi faction "automatically expelled" Pacquiao from the ruling party for filing his certificate of candidacy (COC) for president under the Progressive Movement for the Devolution of Initiatives (Promdi), which is based in Cebu. However, Pimentel said that Pacquiao did not violate the party's constitution.

On October 8, 2021, the last day of filing of candidacies, Bato dela Rosa filed his candidacy, saying that no one else can continue the policies of the Duterte administration as well as he. When asked if he was mocking the election by serving as a placeholder for Davao City mayor Sara Duterte, dela Rosa said "I won as a senator, number 5," in the 2019 elections for senator. Dela Rosa later said that this has long been planned, but they were hiding it because it would've been criticized if it was revealed earlier.

On May 6, 2022, the Commission on Elections recognized the wing of Energy Secretary Alfonso Cusi as the legitimate faction of the party.

==== Pacquiao's criticism against Duterte and the government ====
On June 22, Pacquiao said that he would declare "war" on corruption. On June 29, following Pacquiao's accusations that the government under the Duterte administration was more corrupt than the previous administration, Duterte challenged Pacquiao to expose government offices involved in the corruption. On the same day, Pacquiao accepted Duterte's challenge; Pacquiao said that he is not a liar and not corrupt. He noted that President Duterte himself also acknowledged in October 2020 that government corruption has persisted during his administration. Duterte warned Pacquiao that he would campaign against the latter if he failed to name the corrupt officials. Presidential Anti-Corruption Commission (PACC) chief Greco Belgica said that many cases of corruption have been solved. Pacquiao first named the Department of Health (DOH), to which he dared Secretary Francisco Duque to show the DOH's expenses including where COVID-19 pandemic funds went. Duque himself was "disheartened" by Pacquiao's allegations.

On July 3, Pacquiao alleged that ₱10.4 billion of pandemic funds of the Department of Social Welfare and Development (DSWD) are missing. He noted that the government borrowed ₱207.6 billion to aid Filipinos who lost their livelihood due to the COVID-19 pandemic. He also questioned the distribution of the social amelioration program (SAP) via e-wallet application Starpay, in which he said that out of the 1.8 million SAP beneficiaries, only 500,000 were able to download the app. On the same day, Pacquiao clarified that he helped Duterte in fighting corruption and that he is not quarreling with him. On July 12, Duterte called Pacquiao "punch drunk" over the latter's claim of government corruption. Pacquiao responded, stating that "maybe I'll just have a memorization contest." Malacañang denounced Pacquiao's claims, stating that his allegations are baseless. The prior week, Duterte also mentioned Pacquiao's tax evasion case and noted that "cheating the government is a form of corruption."

On July 15, Pacquiao filed a Senate resolution for an investigation into the alleged missing ₱10.4 billion in SAP funds.

On August 3, Pacquiao sought help from the Philippine National Police (PNP) to investigate and identify the perpetrator behind purported false information accusing him of misusing government funds allotted to a sport training center project in Sarangani. On August 5, Pacquiao released an 8-minute teaser video titled Ang Hiwaga sa Ayuda about the alleged anomaly of SAP distribution.

On September 2, in an interview on News5's Diretsahan, Pacquiao slammed Duterte for defending his allies, who had created anomalies within the government. On September 13, following Harry Roque's outburst to doctors during the Inter-Agency Task Force for the Management of Emerging Infectious Diseases (IATF) meeting few days prior, Pacquiao criticized the government for a "mismanaged" response to the COVID-19 pandemic and called on them to focus on mass vaccination in order to minimize the number of deaths and hospitalizations. The Malacañang Palace responded to Pacquiao's statement by saying that he was just "politicking."

=== COMELEC 2022 ruling ===
On May 6, 2022, the COMELEC declared the PDP–Laban Cusi faction as the legitimate members of the party.

=== Renaming of the Cusi-led PDP–Laban ===
The PDP–Laban faction led by Alfonso Cusi dropped the "Laban" from its name and became known as the Partido Demokratiko Pilipino. Nevertheless, Koko Pimentel insist that he is still a member of the original PDP–Laban.

=== Supreme Court ruling ===
The Supreme Court affirmed the Cusi faction as the legitimate PDP-Laban on July 8, 2025.

== Faction officials (2021) ==
Position	Duterte–Cusi wing	Pacquiao–Pimentel wing
Party President	Alfonso Cusi	Manny Pacquiao
Chairman	Rodrigo Duterte	Aquilino Pimentel III
Executive Vice President	Karlo Nograles	Lutgardo Barbo
Secretary-General	Melvin Matibag	Arnulfo Teves, Jr.
National Treasurer	Rianne Cuevas	Evan Rebadulla
