= Candidates in the 2022 Philippine Senate election =

This is a list of candidates in the 2022 Philippine Senate election.

== Official candidates ==
The Commission on Elections has published a final list of accepted candidates which are now included in the printed ballots.

#	Image	Candidate	Party	Coalitions						
#	Image	Candidate	Party	Team Bilis Kilos	LEAD	MP3	Lacson–Sotto slate	TRoPa	Tuloy na Pagbabago	UniTeam
1.		Abner Afuang	Independent							
2.		Ibrahim Albani	WPP							
3.		Jesus Arranza	Independent							
4.		Teddy Baguilat	Liberal		Guest			Yes		
5.		Agnes Bailen	Independent		Dropped					
6.		Carl Balita	Aksyon	Yes						
7.		Lutgardo Barbo	PDP–Laban			Yes				
8.		Herbert Bautista	NPC				Dropped			Yes
9.		Greco Belgica	PDDS						Yes	
10.		Silvestre Bello Jr.	PDP–Laban							
11.		Jejomar Binay	UNA			Guest	Guest	Guest		Endorsed by Sara Duterte
12.		Roy Cabonegro	PLM		Yes					
13.		John Castriciones	PDP–Laban	Guest					Yes	
14.		Alan Peter Cayetano	Independent							
15.		Melchor Chavez	WPP							
16.		Neri Colmenares	Makabayan		Guest	Guest		(Supports Robredo-Pangilinan)		
17.		David d'Angelo	PLM		Yes					
18.		Leila de Lima	Liberal		Guest			Yes		
19.		Monsour del Rosario	Reporma			Guest	Yes	(Supports Robredo-Pangilinan)		
20.		Fernando Diaz	PPP							
21.		Chel Diokno	KANP		Guest			Yes		
22.		JV Ejercito	NPC			Guest	Guest			Endorsed by Sara Duterte
23.		Guillermo Eleazar	Reporma				Yes			Endorsed by Sara Duterte
24.		Ernie Ereño	PM							
25.		Francis Escudero	NPC			Guest	Guest	Guest		Endorsed by Sara Duterte
26.		Luke Espiritu	PLM		Yes					
27.		Jinggoy Estrada	PMP							Yes
28.		Baldomero Falcone	DPP							
29.		Larry Gadon	KBL							Yes
30.		Win Gatchalian	NPC			Guest	Dropped			Yes
31.		Dick Gordon	Bagumbayan			Guest	Guest	Guest		
32.		Samira Gutoc	Aksyon	Yes	Guest					
33.		Gregorio Honasan	Independent				Guest			Guest
34.		Risa Hontiveros	Akbayan		Guest			Yes		
35.		RJ Javellana	Independent							
36.		Nur-Mahal Kiram	Independent							
37.		Elmer Labog	Makabayan		Guest	Guest		(Supports Robredo-Pangilinan)		
38.		Alex Lacson	Ang Kapatiran					Yes		
39.		Rey Langit	PDP–Laban						Yes	
40.		Loren Legarda	NPC			Guest	Guest			Guest
41.	President/ National Convenor- National Public Transport Coalition and NACTODAP	Ariel Lim	Independent							
42.		Emily Mallillin	PPM							
43.		~~Rodante Marcoleta~~ (later withdrawn)	PDP–Laban						Yes	Guest
44.		Francis Leo Marcos	Independent							
45.		Sonny Matula	Independent		Guest			Yes		
46.		Marieta Mindalano-Adam	Katipunan							
47.		Leo Olarte	Bigkis							
48.		Minguita Padilla	Reporma				Yes			
49.		Robin Padilla	PDP–Laban						Yes	Guest
50.		Salvador Panelo	PDP–Laban						Yes	Endorsed by Sara Duterte
51.		Astravel Pimentel-Naik	PDP–Laban						Yes	
52.		Emmanuel Piñol	NPC				Yes			
53.		Willie Ricablanca Jr.	PM							
54.		Harry Roque	PRP							Yes
55.		Nur-Ana Sahidulla	PDDS							
56.		Jopet Sison	Aksyon	Yes						
57.		Gilberto Teodoro	PRP							Yes
58.		Antonio Trillanes	Liberal					Yes		
59.		Raffy Tulfo	Independent			Guest	Guest			
60.		Rey Valeros	Independent							
61.		Joel Villanueva	Independent			Guest	Guest	Guest		Endorsed by Sara Duterte
62.		Mark Villar	Nacionalista						Guest	Yes
63.		Carmen Zubiaga	Independent					(Supports Robredo-Pangilinan)		
64.		Migz Zubiri	Independent			Guest	Dropped	Dropped		Guest

== Filed certificates of candidacies ==
A total of 178 people filed candidacies for senator.

The following have filed certificates of candidacies, formally notifying the commission that they are running.

October 1

- Abner Afuang (Independent), former mayor of Pagsanjan, Laguna, lost election in 2019
- Lutgardo "Lutz" Barbo (PDP–Laban - Pacquiao Faction), former governor of Eastern Samar, former secretary of the Senate of the Philippines, and former president of Philippine Normal University
- Bertito del Mundo, lost election in 2019 for representative of Tarlac's 3rd legislative district
- Phil Delos Reyes, security guard
- Francis "Chiz" Escudero (NPC), incumbent governor of Sorsogon and former senator, term limited in 2019
- Bai Maylanie Esmael
- Baldomero Falcone (Democratic Party), business consultant, lost election in 2013
- Zigfrid Giron
- Ana Theresia "Risa" Hontiveros (Akbayan), incumbent senator
- Lorna Regina "Loren" Legarda (NPC), incumbent representative from Antique's at-large congressional district and former senator, term limited in 2019
- Norman Marquez
- Romeo Plasquita, retired cop and was declared nuisance candidate in the 2016 presidential polls. Also filed COC for Leyte governor in 2019.
- Samuel Sanchez

October 2

- Joel "Pastor" Apolinario, founder of alleged Ponzi firm Kapa Community Ministry International
- Loreto "St. Loreto" Banosan
- Joseph Victor "JV" Ejercito (NPC), former senator, lost re-election in 2019
- Rodelo Pidoy, declared nuisance candidate in the 2010 presidential polls
- Rafael "Raffy" Tulfo (Independent), broadcaster

October 3

- Luz Aquino
- Jose "Jinggoy" Estrada (PMP), senator from 2004 to 2016, lost election in 2019
- Samira Gutoc (Aksyon), former member of the Bangsamoro Transition Commission and member of the ARMM Regional Legislative Assembly, lost election in 2019
- Najar "Jinggoy Adang" Salih

October 4

- Roberto Aniceto Jr. (Green Republican)
- Pedro Austria (Green Republican)
- Eleazar Calampiano (Green Republican)
- Florencio Carlos (Green Republican)
- Anthony Castro (Green Republican)
- Rosita Maura Delos Angeles (Green Republican)
- Bobby Francisco (Green Republican)
- Junbert Guigayuma (Independent)
- Claro Guzman (Green Republican)
- Mario Mangco (Green Republican)
- Marieta Mindalano-Adam (Katipunan ng Kamalayang Kayumanggi)
- Edgar Miranda (Green Republican)
- Jigger ND Pitos (Green Republican)
- Maria Lourdes Santiago (Green Republican)
- Narciso Solis, miner
- Jennet "Genie" Tam, businesswoman and accountant

October 5

- Lawin Arellano (Independent), lost in 2019
- Orlando Bernardo
- Joseph Dy
- Paul Medard Escolano, lawyer
- Norberto Esmeralda, Jr.
- Lorenzo "Larry" Gadon (KBL), lawyer and perennial candidate, lost elections in 2016 and 2019
- Samuel Aloysius Jardin
- Nur-Ana "Lady Ann" Sahidulla (PDDS), former representative from Sulu's second congressional district, lost election in 2019

October 6

- Nelson "Dodong" Ancajas
- Herbert Constantine "Bistek" Bautista (NPC), former Mayor of Quezon City
- Roy Cabonegro (PLM)
- Paolo "Powee" Capino (Reporma), media practitioner
- Panfilo "Jun" Dabandan Jr.
- Monsour del Rosario III (Reporma), former representative from Makati's first congressional district
- Luke Espíritu (PLM)
- Melissa Fortes
- Elmer Labog (Makabayan), Chairman of Kilusang Mayo Uno
- Sixto Lagare, lost election in 2016
- Ponciano Leyte Jr.
- Adz Nikabulin (Independent), lost election in 2010
- Leo Olarte (Bigkis Pinoy), former Philippine Medical Association president
- Ma. Dominga Cecilia "Minguita" Padilla (Reporma), Eye Bank Foundation president and former head executive staff of the Department of Health.
- Joel Villanueva (Independent), incumbent senator
- Mark Villar (Nacionalista), incumbent secretary of public works and highways
- Carmen Zubiaga (Independent), chairperson of National Council on Disability Affairs
- Migz Zubiri (Independent), incumbent senator

October 7

- Agnes Afable (Green Republican)
- Shariff Ibrahim Albani (Labor Party)
- Anita Alingod
- Manuel Andrada (Save Phil)
- Jesus Aranza, chair of Federation of Philippine Industries
- Oscar Arcilla Jr. (Maharlika People's Party)
- Rowena Awang, nurse
- Agnes Bailen, former DBM undersecretary and staff of Miriam Defensor Santiago
- Carlito "Carl" Balita (Aksyon), radio program host and infotainer
- Jejomar Binay (UNA), former vice president of the Philippines
- Arnel Paciano Casanova (Katipunan ng Nagkakaisang Pilipino)
- Jose Castillo
- Alan Peter Cayetano (Nacionalista), incumbent representative of Taguig–Pateros's 1st district, former senator
- Neri Colmenares (Makabayan), former representative of Bayan Muna, lost elections in 2016 and 2019
- Ernesto Cruz
- David D’Angelo (PLM)
- Fernando Diaz (Pilipino para sa Pagbabago)
- Jose Manuel Tadeo "Chel" Diokno (Katipunan ng Nagkakaisang Pilipino), founding dean of DLSU College of Law and chairman of Free Legal Assistance Group, lost election in 2019
- Ashleah Ebad
- Manolo Ebora, ship captain
- Leodegario Estrella
- Marcil Guay (Maharlika People's Party)
- Rodolfo "RJ" Javellana (KDP)
- Ali Kagui, soldier
- Pedro Lopez
- Sonny Matula (Independent), lost election in 2019
- Roben Parashan (PROMDI)
- Gilbert "Gibo" Teodoro (PRP), former secretary of National Defense
- Reynaldo Valeros Jr. (KDP)

October 8

- Iluminado Macalalad
- Nur-Mahal "Princess Light" Kiram, daughter of Sultan Muhammad Mahakuttah Kiram
- Eugenio "Kenny" Insigne, lawyer and former chairman of the National Commission on Indigenous Peoples
- Bethsaida Lopez
- Sherwin "Win" Gatchalian (NPC), incumbent senator
- Silvestre Bello Jr. (PDP-Laban), elder brother of labor secretary Silvestre Bello III
- Leila de Lima (Liberal), incumbent senator
- Marianito Roque (Lakas–CMD), former labor secretary
- Alexander "Alex" Lacson (Ang Kapatiran), lawyer and author, lost election in 2010
- Vilma Detera
- Luzviminda "Winnie" Calicdan
- Emmanuel "Manny" Piñol (NPC), former governor of Cotabato Province and former chairman of the Mindanao Development Authority
- Melchor "Mel" Chavez (Labor Party), perennial candidate, lost election in 2001, 2007, 2016, and 2019
- Rundy Montoya (Maharlika People's Party)
- Francis Leo "FLM" Marcos, online personality
- Paulo Mario Martelino (PRP)
- Ruel Lamoste (Maharlika People's Party)
- Arlene Josephine Butay (Labor Party)
- Bilgadil Albani
- Luther Meniano (Maharlika People's Party), lost election in 2019
- Bandao Bansilan (Independent)
- Ernesto Librando, lost election in 2016 for representative of Negros Occidental's 1st legislative district
- Jesus Embuscado (Independent)
- Ariel Lim (Independent)
- Edgardo Los Baños
- Joseph Agabon (Independent)
- Pol Bulilan (Maharlika People's Party)
- Gil Almasco (Independent)
- Roger Pasa-an (Independent)
- Mario Camba (Independent)
- Aaron Soguillon (Maharlika People's Party)
- Joed Serrano, film and concert producer
- Vangie Abello (Independent), lost election in 2019
- Gregorio "Gringo" Honasan (Independent), term-limited in 2019; later appointed as secretary of Information and Communications Technology
- Rey Langit (PDP–Laban – Cusi Faction), broadcaster, lost election in 2016
- Richard "Dick" Gordon (Bagumbayan–VNP), incumbent senator
- Rodante Marcoleta (PDP–Laban – Cusi Faction), incumbent House deputy speaker and representative for SAGIP
- Salvador "Sal" Panelo (PDP–Laban– Cusi Faction), incumbent chief presidential legal counsel, lost election in 1992
- Antonio "Sonny" Trillanes IV (Liberal), term-limited in 2019
- Robinhood Ferdinand "Robin" Padilla (PDP–Laban– Cusi Faction), actor
- Greco Belgica (PDDS), incumbent Presidential Anti-Corruption Commission chairman, lost elections in 2013 and 2016
- Teodoro "Teddy" Baguilat (Liberal), former representative from Ifugao's lone district
- John Castriciones (PDP–Laban– Cusi Faction), incumbent secretary of Agrarian Reform
- Lorenzo Cagote (Independent)
- Elbern Suguipit (Green Republican)
- Lynn Alegre (Partido Pederal ng Maharlika)
- Wilfredo Red (Independent)
- Julian "Ded Pul" Navarra (Independent)
- Mona Liza Visorde (PDDS)
- Antonio Alabata (Maharlika People's Party)
- Astravel Pimentel-Naik (PDP–Laban– Cusi Faction), undersecretary of Commission on Filipinos Overseas
- Rosemarie Palacio (Maharlika People's Party)
- Napoleon Capitulo Sr. (Independent)
- Chelsa Tumaquin (Independent)
- Lamberto Payongayong, fake lawyer
- William Iliw-Iliw (Maharlika People's Party)
- Christopher Cruz (KDP)
- Loreto Tenulete Jr. (KDP)
- Manuel Insigne (Independent)
- Willie Ricablanca (Partido Maharlika)
- Emily Mallillin (Partido Pederal ng Maharlika)
- Edgar Avinado (Maharlika People's Party)
- Henry Petrola (Independent)
- Rex Noel (Independent)
- Filipino Alvarado (Independent)
- Ramon Bayron (Independent)
- Elmer Francisco (PFP)
- Ariel Mazo (Independent)
- Tyson Tu (Independent)

== Candidates who withdrew ==
These individuals withdrew after filing their candidacies:

- Noli de Castro (Aksyon), former vice president of the Philippines, former senator
  De Castro withdrew his candidacy due to "personal reasons" that he did not disclose.
- Marianito Roque (Lakas), former secretary of Labor and Employment
  Roque withdrew his bid for Senate on November 13, reasoning out that the electoral field is too crowded for him.
- Paolo "Powee" Capino (Reporma), radio commentator, media practitioner, PWD advocate
  Capino backed out after falling behind polls. He officially withdrew his candidacy on November 15.
- Jesus Durian Jr. (KDP)
  Durian withdrew his bid for Senate on November 15.
- Loreto Tenolete Jr. (KDP)
  Tenolete withdrew his bid for Senate on November 15.
- Paulo Mario Martelino (PRP)
  Martelino withdrew his bid for Senate on November 15.
- Mona Liza Visorde (PRP)
  Visorde withdrew his bid for Senate on November 15.
- Rodrigo Duterte (PDDS), incumbent president of the Philippines
  Duterte withdrew his bid for Senate on December 14.
- Joed Serrano (Independent), film and concert producer
  Serrano withdrew his bid for Senate on December 16.
- Rodante Marcoleta (PDP–Laban), deputy speaker of the House of Representatives of the Philippines
  Marcoleta withdrew his bid for Senate on April 27.

== Substitute candidates ==
- Rodrigo Duterte (PDDS), incumbent President of the Philippines
  He substituted Mona Liza Visorde who withdrew on November 15, 2021.
- Harry Roque (PRP), incumbent presidential spokesperson
  He substituted Paulo Mario Martelino who withdrew on November 15, 2021.
- Guillermo Eleazar (Reporma), former Chief of the Philippine National Police
  He substituted Paolo Capino who withdrew on November 15, 2021.
- Jose Peter "Jopet" Sison (Aksyon), former National Home Mortgage Finance Corporation president, former Quezon City councilor, lawyer and TV host
  He substituted Noli de Castro who withdrew on October 13, 2021.
- Joseph Ross Jocson (KDP), Metro Manila Development Authority board member, retired colonel, and former nominee of 1-Ang Trabahador na Pinoy Party-list
  He substituted Loreto Tenolete Jr. who withdrew on November 15, 2021.
- Ramon Mitra III (KDP), son of former Speaker Ramon Mitra Jr., lost election in 2010
  He substituted Jesus Durian Jr. who withdrew on November 15, 2021.

== Potential candidates ==
Various personalities have directly or indirectly hinted on the possibility of running for senator in 2022. In other cases, sources have hinted on the possibility of certain candidates to run for senator in 2022. These were such people, but did not file candidacies for senator:

- Grepor Belgica (PDP–Laban / PDDS), incumbent presidential adviser on religious affairs
  After giving way for Bong Go in the presidency, it was reported that Belgica was to substitute one of PDDS' senatorial candidates, and would have run alongside his son, Greco, and President Duterte.
- Silvestre Bello III (PDP-Laban / Lakas-CMD), incumbent secretary of Labor and Employment, lost election in 2010.
- Karlo Nograles (PDP-Laban– Cusi Faction), incumbent Cabinet Secretariat
- Dakila Carlo "Dax" Cua (PDP-Laban– Cusi Faction), incumbent governor of Quirino

== Declined to be candidates ==
Individuals below have been speculated to run in this election, but have since denied their interest in running.

- Emmanuel "Manny" Pacquiao (PDP–Laban – Pacquiao Faction / PROMDI), incumbent senator
  Pacquiao was initially invited by PDP-Laban's opposing faction to run under their Senate slate. He declined and eventually proceeded to run for president.
- Bam Aquino (Liberal), former senator
  Aquino dropped his bid to serve full-time as Leni Robredo's campaign manager.
- Arthur "Art" Tugade (Reform Party), incumbent secretary of Transportation
- Teodoro "Teddy Boy" Locsin Jr. (PDP–Laban), incumbent secretary of Foreign Affairs
- Delfin "Del" Lorenzana, incumbent secretary of National Defense
- Bernadette Fatima "Berna" Romulo-Puyat, incumbent secretary of Tourism
- Martin Andanar, incumbent Presidential Communications Operations Office secretary
- Benjamin "Benhur" Abalos Jr. (PDP-Laban– Cusi Faction), incumbent chairman of Metropolitan Manila Development Authority
- Gregorio Larrazabal, former Commission on Elections commissioner
  Larrazabal would instead seek the post to be vacated by Lucy Torres-Gomez.
- Martin Romualdez (Lakas-CMD), incumbent House majority floor leader and representative from Leyte's 1st district, lost election in 2016
  Amidst rumors of vice presidential or senatorial runs, Romualdez filed for reelection.
- Vilma Santos (Nacionalista), incumbent House deputy speaker and representative from Batangas' 6th district
- Lucy Torres-Gomez (PDP–Laban), incumbent representative from Leyte's 4th district
  Torres would instead seek the current post of her husband, incumbent Mayor Richard Gomez of Ormoc.
- Gwendolyn Garcia (PDP–Laban), incumbent governor of Cebu
  Garcia turned down the idea of running for Senate around April. She eventually filed for reelection.
- Willie Revillame, TV host
  A day before the deadline of filing of candidacies, Revillame announced on his TV show Wowowin that he won't be running for senator after being urged by President Duterte to do so, saying that he could help even not in public office
- Angel Locsin, actress
  Locsin ruled out the idea of entering national politics, as she considers actresses such as herself as public servants.
- Coco Martin, actor
