= Opinion polling for the 2022 Philippine Senate election =

This article covers opinion polling for the 2022 Philippine Senate election.

Opinion polling in Philippines is conducted by Social Weather Stations (SWS), Pulse Asia, OCTA Research, and other pollsters.

Those who win outright are in bold. Those that are within the margin of error are in italics.

== Polling for senatorial elections ==
Pollsters usually do face-to-face interviews on respondents. They sometimes present respondents with a mock ballot on which the respondent will mark his or her choices for the Senate. The Senate of the Philippines is elected via multiple non-transferable vote on an at-large basis, where a voter has 12 votes, cannot transfer any of the votes to a candidate, and can vote for up to twelve candidates. If the mock ballot has 13 or more preferences, the pollster classifies it as "invalid."

Pollsters, aside from publishing preferences per candidate, also include other data such as averages on how many candidates the respondents included on their preferences.

== Calendar ==
- Filing of candidacies: October 1 to 8, 2021
- Deadline in substituting a candidate for it to appear on the ballot: November 15, 2021
- Campaign period for nationally-elected positions: February 8 to May 7, 2022
- Campaign period for locally-elected positions: March 25 to May 7, 2022
- Election day: May 9, 2022

== Survey details ==
Date/s administered	Pollster	Sample size	Margin of error	Major issues when poll was administered
May 2–5, 2022	Publicus Asia	1,500	±3.0%	
Apr 22–25, 2022	OCTA	2,400	±2.0%	
Apr 19–21, 2022	Publicus Asia	1,500	±3.0%	
Apr 16–21, 2022	Pulse Asia	2,400	±2.0%	
Apr 18–19, 2022	MBC–DZRH	7,560	±1.13%	
Apr 2–6, 2022	OCTA	1,200	±3.0%	
Apr 1–4, 2022	RMN–APCORE	2,400	±2.0%	
Mar 30–Apr 6, 2022	Publicus Asia	1,500	±3.0%	
Mar 17–21, 2022	Pulse Asia	1,500	±2.0%	
Mar 12, 2022	MBC–DZRH	7,566	±1.13%	
Mar 9–14, 2022	Publicus Asia	1,500	±2.6%	
Mar 5–10, 2022	OCTA	1,200	±3.0%	
Mar 2–5, 2022	RMN–APCORE	2,400	±2.0%	
Feb 18–23, 2022	Pulse Asia	2,400	±2.0%	
Feb 12–17, 2022	OCTA	1,200	±3.0%	
Feb 11–16, 2022	Publicus Asia	1,500	±2.6%	
Feb 9–15, 2022	I&AC	1,200	±3.0%	Start of the campaign period for nationally elected positions
Jan 26–30, 2022	RMN–APCORE	2,400	±2.0%	
Jan 22–30, 2022	RP-MDF	10,000	±1.0%	
Jan 19–24, 2022	Pulse Asia	2,400	±2.0%	
Dec 11–12, 2021	MBC–DZRH	7,614	±1.13%	
Dec 6–10, 2021	Publicus Asia	1,500	±2.6%	
Dec 1–6, 2021	Pulse Asia	2,400	±2.0%	
Nov 23–29, 2021	RMN–APCORE	2,400	±2.0%	
Oct 17–26, 2021	RP-MDF	10,000	±2.0%	
Oct 20–23, 2021	SWS	1,200	±3.0%	
Oct 11–18, 2021	Publicus Asia	1,500	±2.6%	Filing of certificates of candidacy
Sep 12–16, 2021	SWS	1,200	±3.0%	
Sep 6–11, 2021	Pulse Asia	2,400	±2.0%	
Jul 24–31, 2021	MBC–DZRH	7,500	±1.13%	
Jul 13–19, 2021	Publicus Asia	1,500	±2.6%	The Philippines recorded its first instance Delta variant of COVID-19.
Jun 7–16, 2021	Pulse Asia	2,400	±2.0%	1Sambayan announced its nominees for president and vice-president.
Mar 20–29, 2021	Publicus Asia	1,500	±2.6%	
Feb 22–Mar 3, 2021	Pulse Asia	2,400	±2.0%	Dismissal of the Marcos v. Robredo electoral protest.
Nov 23–Dec 2, 2020	Pulse Asia	2,400	±2.0%	Typhoon Ulysses, appointment of Debold Sinas as Chief of the Philippine National Police

== Per candidate ==
=== By voter preferences ===
==== Until election day ====
Candidate	Party	Mar 30–Apr 6, 2022 Publicus	Apr 1–4, 2022 RMN–APCORE	Apr 2–6, 2022 OCTA	Apr 18–19, 2022 MBC	Apr 16–21, 2022 Pulse Asia	Apr 19–21, 2022 Publicus	Apr 22–25, 2022 OCTA	May 2–5, 2022 Publicus
Abner Afuang	Independent	3.7%	—	1%	—	2.8%	4.0%	2%	3.40%
Ibrahim Albani	WPP	3.3%	—	2%	—	2.9%	3.3%	1%	3.87%
Jesus Arranza	Independent	4.9%	—	—	—	1.1%	5.7%	1%	6.13%
Teddy Baguilat	Liberal	12.8%	—	6%	—	3.9%	13.1%	2%	13.93%
Agnes Bailen	Independent	3.3%	—	—	—	2.3%	3.5%	1%	4.47%
Carl Balita	Aksyon	11.3%	—	2%	—	4.9%	12.6%	3%	12.13%
Lutgardo Barbo	PDP–Laban	2.4%	—	1%	—	1.2%	4.3%	2%	4.27%
Herbert Bautista	NPC	24.1%	25%	28%	23.17%	26.6%	29.1%	27%	29.53%
Greco Belgica	PDDS	9.5%	—	1%	—	2.4%	8.9%	2%	10.33%
Silvestre Bello Jr.	PDP–Laban	9.6%	—	6%	—	4.4%	7.8%	5%	8.60%
Jejomar Binay	UNA	20.9%	33%	**42%**	**33.47%**	32.5%	21.5%	31%	24.40%
Roy Cabonegro	PLM	2.3%	—	—	—	1.0%	3.9%	1%	3.60%
John Castriciones	PDP–Laban	3.1%	—	1%	—	2.3%	4.0%	1%	4.93%
Alan Peter Cayetano	Independent	**43.8%**	**39%**	**48%**	**42.63%**	**42.3%**	**42.6%**	**40%**	**40.20%**
Melchor Chavez	WPP	3.8%	—	5%	—	3.4%	4.7%	4%	4.07%
Neri Colmenares	Makabayan	16.7%	—	8%	—	9.7%	14.9%	10%	15.60%
David D' Angelo	PLM	1.9%	—	0.1%	—	0.8%	3.2%	1%	2.80%
Leila de Lima	Liberal	14.5%	—	13%	—	10.7%	14.7%	10%	16.20%
Monsour del Rosario	Reporma	6.4%	—	7%	—	8.9%	8.9%	7%	8.07%
Fernando Diaz	PPP	1.8%	—	2%	—	1.0%	2.5%	1%	1.67%
Chel Diokno	KANP	**30.5%**	18%	15%	—	10.8%	28.9%	13%	27.33%
JV Ejercito	NPC	24.7%	29%	36%	30.27%	**34.3%**	26.5%	31%	25.93%
Guillermo Eleazar	Reporma	18.7%	20%	24%	19.50%	16.8%	19.4%	22%	20.27%
Ernie Ereño	PM	2.0%	—	1%	—	0.9%	2.1%	1%	2.67%
Francis Escudero	NPC	**49.4%**	**44%**	**50%**	**44.16%**	**38.6%**	**46.8%**	**46%**	**46.20%**
Luke Espiritu	PLM	8.5%	—	4%	—	2.7%	8.1%	3%	7.27%
Jinggoy Estrada	PMP	17.5%	28%	**42%**	30.50%	32.3%	19.8%	**33%**	20.47%
Baldomero Falcone	DPP	1.2%	—	1%	—	0.6%	1.7%	1%	1.07%
Larry Gadon	KBL	25.7%	20%	17%	22.65%	12.4%	25.9%	17%	25.33%
Win Gatchalian	NPC	**42.0%**	**39%**	**39%**	**38.56%**	**37.0%**	**40.5%**	**39%**	**42.40%**
Richard J. Gordon	Bagumbayan	26.0%	20%	20%	24.13%	19.3%	24.9%	19%	21.00%
Samira Gutoc	Aksyon	4.9%	—	6%	—	4.3%	4.1%	3%	3.73%
Gregorio Honasan	Independent	19.3%	21%	24%	26.28%	22.4%	19.3%	22%	19.87%
Risa Hontiveros	Akbayan	**34.4%**	**34%**	33%	31.33%	32.3%	**31.9%**	31%	**31.07%**
RJ Javellana	Independent	1.4%	—	—	—	2.0%	1.0%	1%	0.73%
Nur-Mahal Kiram	Independent	1.8%	—	—	—	1.8%	1.1%	1%	1.13%
Elmer Labog	Makabayan	2.8%	—	—	—	1.6%	2.1%	1%	2.40%
Alex Lacson	Ang Kapatiran	9.3%	—	13%	—	11.4%	8.9%	7%	8.73%
Rey Langit	PDP–Laban	2.3%	—	4%	—	2.6%	2.9%	3%	2.93%
Loren Legarda	NPC	**43.3%**	**47%**	**56%**	**43.19%**	**49.4%**	**39.1%**	**51%**	**42.40%**
Ariel Lim	Independent	0.8%	—	1%	—	1.3%	1.5%	1%	0.93%
Emily Mallillin	PPM	0.5%	—	—	—	1.1%	0.7%	1%	0.73%
Rodante Marcoleta	PDP–Laban	17.4%	—	10%	—	9.2%	17.3%	11%	14.87%
Francis Leo Marcos	Independent	9.5%	—	10%	—	7.4%	10.1%	8%	9.40%
Sonny Matula	Independent	4.3%	—	3%	—	1.7%	3.8%	2%	3.73%
Marieta Mindalano-Adam	Katipunan	0.8%	—	—	—	1.7%	1.0%	1%	0.60%
Leo Olarte	Bigkis Pinoy	0.7%	—	—	—	0.4%	0.7%	2%	0.67%
Minguita Padilla	Reporma	3.5%	—	2%	—	4.4%	3.5%	3%	4.20%
Robin Padilla	PDP–Laban	25.7%	**34%**	**44%**	**40.95%**	**42.9%**	**31.5%**	**44%**	**34.67%**
Salvador Panelo	PDP–Laban	21.1%	—	9%	—	6.7%	17.3%	8%	17.20%
Astra Pimentel-Naik	PDP–Laban	4.3%	—	11%	—	7.3%	4.3%	5%	3.20%
Emmanuel Piñol	NPC	9.9%	—	4%	—	5.0%	9.4%	6%	10.00%
Willie Ricablanca Jr.	PM	0.7%	—	—	—	1.4%	0.7%	1%	0.93%
Harry Roque	PRP	23.8%	19%	25%	25.27%	17.9%	24.6%	24%	25.33%
Nur-Ana Sahidulla	PDDS	0.9%	—	1%	—	2.0%	1.4%	1%	1.47%
Jopet Sison	Aksyon	5.6%	—	7%	—	6.0%	7.6%	6%	5.00%
Gilbert Teodoro	PRP	27.1%	—	20%	—	16.9%	25.7%	20%	28.53%
Antonio Trillanes	Liberal	14.7%	—	22%	17.72%	19.0%	12.4%	18%	13.27%
Raffy Tulfo	Independent	**39.1%**	**59%**	**68%**	**57.92%**	**50.4%**	**38.5%**	**63%**	**38.80%**
Rey Valeros	Independent	1.0%	—	1%	—	0.8%	1.1%	1%	0.53%
Joel Villanueva	Independent	26.7%	33%	**41%**	31.35%	26.5%	28.2%	**36%**	25.73%
Mark Villar	Nacionalista	**35.9%**	**40%**	**59%**	**41.57%**	**35.9%**	**33.1%**	**55%**	**35.47%**
Carmen Zubiaga	Independent	1.7%	—	2%	—	1.1%	1.9%	2%	2.13%
Migz Zubiri	Independent	**33.5%**	**38%**	**54%**	**40.98%**	**37.0%**	29.3%	**49%**	**30.87%**
Don't know									
Refused						5.8%			
None						2.3%			
Invalid votes (13 or more names)									

==== Until campaigning for locally-elected positions ====
Candidate	Party	Feb 9–15, 2022 I&AC	Feb 11–16, 2022 Publicus	Feb 12–17, 2022 OCTA	Feb 18–23, 2022 Pulse Asia	Mar 2–5, 2022 RMN–APCORE	Mar 5–10, 2022 OCTA	Mar 9–14, 2022 Publicus	Mar 12, 2022 MBC	Mar 17–21, 2022 Pulse Asia
Abner Afuang	Independent	—	—	—	0.8%	—	—	—	—	2.0%
Ibrahim Albani	WPP	—	—	—	1.1%	—	—	—	—	2.6%
Jesus Arranza	Independent	—	—	—	0.6%	—	—	—	—	0.4%
Teddy Baguilat	Liberal	11%	—	—	2.0%	—	—	—	4.1%	3.0%
Agnes Bailen	Independent	—	—	—	0.9%	—	—	—	—	0.9%
Carl Balita	Aksyon	7%	—	2%	2.3%	—	—	—	5.0%	2.9%
Lutgardo Barbo	PDP–Laban	8%	—	—	0.5%	—	—	—	—	0.7%
Herbert Bautista	NPC	19%	21.9%	31%	32.6%	21%	—	22.1%	17.6%	34.3%
Greco Belgica	PDDS	10%	—	—	0.9%	—	—	—	4.1%	2.7%
Silvestre Bello Jr.	PDP–Laban	—	—	6%	3.8%	—	—	—	7.0%	3.9%
Jejomar Binay	UNA	**38%**	21.8%	**39%**	**45.6%**	**34%**	**39%**	21.1%	**34.4%**	**42.5%**
Roy Cabonegro	PLM	—	—	—	0.2%	—	—	—	—	0.4%
John Castriciones	PDP–Laban	7%	—	—	0.5%	—	—	—	—	0.6%
Alan Peter Cayetano	Independent	**60%**	**43.5%**	**61%**	**55.0%**	**43%**	**55%**	**41.6%**	**44.9%**	**56.4%**
Melchor Chavez	WPP	6%	—	—	4.3%	—	—	—	4.8%	4.2%
Neri Colmenares	Makabayan	15%	—	10%	8.9%	—	—	—	11.8%	12.3%
David D' Angelo	PLM	—	—	—	0.3%	—	—	—	—	0.5%
Leila de Lima	Liberal	15%	—	14%	11.4%	—	—	—	12.3%	11.4%
Monsour del Rosario	Reporma	11%	—	11%	7.5%	—	—	—	6.5%	8.7%
Fernando Diaz	PPP	—	—	—	1.8%	—	—	—	—	0.3%
Chel Diokno	KANP	27%	26.1%	9%	12.3%	20%	—	**29.5%**	17.2%	13.1%
JV Ejercito	NPC	**35%**	22.4%	35%	31.6%	30%	**44%**	22.7%	28.0%	35.9%
Guillermo Eleazar	Reporma	15%	—	20%	15.7%	—	—	—	15.9%	20.2%
Ernie Ereño	PM	—	—	—	0.5%	—	—	—	—	0.5%
Francis Escudero	NPC	**58%**	**50.7%**	**59%**	**49.8%**	**45%**	**63%**	**48.8%**	**45.3%**	**54.4%**
Luke Espiritu	PLM	—	—	—	0.7%	—	—	—	4.3%	2.8%
Jinggoy Estrada	PMP	28%	19.5%	37%	**38.6%**	**32%**	37%	16.6%	29.7%	36.5%
Baldomero Falcone	DPP	—	—	—	0.7%	—	—	—	—	0.3%
Larry Gadon	KBL	15%	21.2%	8%	10.9%	19%	—	25.1%	19.9%	13.4%
Win Gatchalian	NPC	**45%**	**40.3%**	**39%**	**44.6%**	**42%**	**39%**	**38.4%**	**38.8%**	**50.4%**
Richard J. Gordon	Bagumbayan	**35%**	25.0%	25%	27.3%	19%	—	23.9%	25.7%	28.2%
Samira Gutoc	Aksyon	9%	—	2%	3.3%	—	—	—	5.9%	4.7%
Gregorio Honasan	Independent	23%	20.3%	29%	26.5%	23%	—	19.1%	27.7%	28.2%
Risa Hontiveros	Akbayan	**41%**	**31.3%**	38%	32.3%	**32%**	31%	**32.2%**	**32.2%**	35.9%
RJ Javellana	Independent	—	—	—	0.7%	—	—	—	—	0.1%
Nur-Mahal Kiram	Independent	—	—	—	1.3%	—	—	—	—	1.9%
Elmer Labog	Makabayan	—	—	—	0.2%	—	—	—	—	0.4%
Alex Lacson	Ang Kapatiran	13%	—	6%	9.1%	—	—	—	8.9%	9.7%
Rey Langit	PDP–Laban	11%	—	4%	2.6%	—	—	—	—	2.9%
Loren Legarda	NPC	**50%**	**34.3%**	**66%**	**58.9%**	**48%**	**69%**	**39.5%**	**41.1%**	**58.3%**
Ariel Lim	Independent	—	—	—	1.1%	—	—	—	—	1.0%
Emily Mallillin	PPM	—	—	—	0.5%	—	—	—	—	0.2%
Rodante Marcoleta	PDP–Laban	29%	—	9%	9.8%	—	—	—	9.8%	9.2%
Francis Leo Marcos	Independent	—	—	10%	9.6%	—	—	—	10.9%	8.2%
Sonny Matula	Independent	—	—	—	2.1%	—	—	—	—	1.4%
Marieta Mindalano-Adam	Katipunan	—	—	—	0.5%	—	—	—	—	1.3%
Leo Olarte	Bigkis Pinoy	—	—	—	0.7%	—	—	—	—	0.9%
Minguita Padilla	Reporma	8%	—	—	1.5%	—	—	—	5.4%	3.3%
Robin Padilla	PDP–Laban	32%	23.3%	**43%**	**47.3%**	**34%**	**44%**	25.0%	**36.8%**	**42.5%**
Salvador Panelo	PDP–Laban	10%	—	4%	4.2%	—	—	—	6.6%	9.2%
Astra Pimentel-Naik	PDP–Laban	—	—	6%	11.5%	—	—	—	7.5%	10.1%
Emmanuel Piñol	NPC	13%	—	6%	6.2%	—	—	—	5.3%	5.8%
Willie Ricablanca Jr.	PM	—	—	—	0.3%	—	—	—	—	0.9%
Harry Roque	PRP	—	—	15%	19.8%	—	—	24.7%	23.6%	19.1%
Nur-Ana Sahidulla	PDDS	—	—	—	0.8%	—	—	—	—	1.3%
Jopet Sison	Aksyon	—	—	7%	6.1%	—	—	—	7.0%	7.0%
Gilbert Teodoro	PRP	**38%**	24.1%	16%	20.1%	—	—	23.3%	15.6%	19.8%
Antonio Trillanes	Liberal	17%	—	21%	17.1%	—	—	—	18.1%	23.8%
Raffy Tulfo	Independent	**53%**	**37.3%**	**63%**	**66.9%**	**61%**	**62%**	**38.4%**	**56.3%**	**65.6%**
Rey Valeros	Independent	—	—	—	0.3%	—	—	—	—	0.9%
Joel Villanueva	Independent	34%	25.9%	33%	**42.0%**	30%	33%	25.9%	31.9%	**43.9%**
Mark Villar	Nacionalista	**47%**	**34.7%**	**56%**	**56.2%**	**44%**	**66%**	**34.9%**	**41.6%**	**52.4%**
Carmen Zubiaga	Independent	—	—	—	0.2%	—	—	—	—	0.6%
Migz Zubiri	Independent	**47%**	**34.5%**	**60%**	**50.5%**	**41%**	**65%**	**31.2%**	**43.3%**	**50.1%**
Don't know				—	1.4%					1.8%
Refused				—	0.3%					0.2%
None				—	0.8%					1.7%
Invalid votes (13 or more names)										

==== Until campaigning for nationally-elected positions ====
Candidate	Party	Oct 11–18, 2021 Publicus	Oct 20–23, 2021 SWS	Nov 23–29, 2021 RMN–APCORE	Dec 1–6, 2021 Pulse	Dec 6–10, 2021 Publicus	Dec 11–12, 2021 MBC	Jan 19–24, 2022 Pulse	Jan 26–30, 2022 RMN–APCORE
Abner Afuang	Independent	—	—	—	—	—	—	1.3%	—
Ibrahim Albani	WPP	—	—	—	—	—	—	1.1%	—
Jesus Arranza	Independent	—	—	—	—	—	—	0.3%	—
Teddy Baguilat	Liberal	11.07%	3.0%	—	1.5%	—	—	1.7%	—
Agnes Bailen	Independent	—	—	—	—	—	—	0.1%	—
Lutgardo Barbo	PDP–Laban	—	—	—	0.8%	—	—	0.4%	—
Carl Balita	Aksyon	9.33%	2.0%	—	2.2%	—	—	3.7%	—
Herbert Bautista	NPC	26.87%	24.0%	19%	21.9%	24.53%	13.5%	26.8%	28.0%
Greco Belgica	PDDS	12.13%	2.0%	—	1.3%	—	—	1.7%	—
Silvestre Bello Jr.	PDP–Laban	—	—	—	5.3%	—	6.1%	5.6%	—
Jejomar Binay	UNA	24.33%	**40.0%**	**29%**	**44.7%**	23.87%	**35.2%**	**44.5%**	**32.0%**
Roy Cabonegro	PLM	—	—	—	0.6%	—	—	0.4%	—
John Castriciones	PDP–Laban	3.73%	1.0%	—	0.4%	—	—	1.3%	—
Alan Peter Cayetano	Independent	**46.27%**	**50.0%**	**47%**	**45.27%**	**47%**	**43.1%**	**58.2%**	**49.3%**
Melchor Chavez	WPP	—	—	—	5.0%	—	—	5.9%	—
Neri Colmenares	Makabayan	17.87%	7.0%	—	8.6%	—	10.2%	12.1%	—
David D' Angelo	PLM	—	—	—	0.5%	—	—	0.6%	—
Noli de Castro	Aksyon	**36.40%**	**28.0%**	—	—	—	—	—	—
Leila de Lima	Liberal	13.07%	11.0%	—	12.3%	—	12.0%	10.6%	—
Monsour del Rosario	Reporma	—	7.0%	—	7.6%	—	—	7.1%	—
Fernando Diaz	PPP	—	—	—	—	—	—	1.1%	—
Chel Diokno	KANP	27.20%	10.0%	—	10.7%	25.47%	12.1%	10.0%	15.0%
Rodrigo Duterte	PDDS	—	—	**38%**	**35.8%**	**55.53%**	**34.0%**	**38%**	—
JV Ejercito	NPC	19.60%	26.0%	17%	32.1%	—	25.8%	33.9%	**31.0%**
Guillermo Eleazar	Reporma	—	—	—	9.9%	25.87%	8.4%	17.5%	18.0%
Ernie Ereño	PM	—	—	—	—	—	—	0.4%	—
Francis Escudero	NPC	**58.33%**	**51.0%**	**36%**	**56.73%**	**36%**	**39.0%**	**55.7%**	**52.8%**
Luke Espiritu	PLM	—	—	—	0.4%	—	—	0.6%	—
Jinggoy Estrada	PMP	13.40%	**33.0%**	26%	34.4%	—	**29.7%**	**40.4%**	**30.0%**
Baldomero Falcone	DPP	—	—	—	—	—	—	1.1%	—
Larry Gadon	KBL	20.00%	—	—	9.7%	23.00%	17.3%	10.4%	—
Win Gatchalian	NPC	**41.47%**	25.0%	22%	**40.1%**	**41.60%**	**39.6%**	**45.9%**	**36.0%**
Richard J. Gordon	Bagumbayan	28.80%	26.0%	17%	23.2%	26.67%	21.3%	28.4%	22.0%
Samira Gutoc	Aksyon	8.87%	4.0%	—	2.6%	—	—	2.9%	—
Gregorio Honasan	Independent	25.67%	23.0%	21%	30.5%	20.13%	21.8%	24.8%	19.0%
Risa Hontiveros	Akbayan	**34.67%**	**36.0%**	21%	35.5%	**32.53%**	25.2%	37.1%	29.0%
RJ Javellana	Independent	—	—	—	—	—	—	0.8%	—
Nur-Mahal Kiram	Independent	—	—	—	—	—	—	1.3%	—
Elmer Labog	Makabayan	—	—	—	0.7%	—	—	0.1%	—
Alex Lacson	Ang Kapatiran	11.00%	—	—	12.7%	—	8.6%	12.4%	—
Rey Langit	PDP–Laban	5.93%	4.0%	—	3.9%	—	—	2.4%	—
Loren Legarda	NPC	**40.20%**	**45.0%**	**36%**	**58.7%**	**37.80%**	**31.9%**	**58.0%**	**43.1%**
Ariel Lim	Independent	—	—	—	—	—	—	1.3%	—
Emily Mallillin	PPM	—	—	—	—	—	—	0.1%	—
Rodante Marcoleta	PDP–Laban	13.87%	5.0%	—	7.9%	—	8.1%	7.8%	—
Francis Leo Marcos	Independent	—	—	—	—	—	—	10.2%	—
Sonny Matula	Independent	—	—	—	1.4%	—	—	0.5%	—
Marieta Mindalano-Adam	Katipunan	—	—	—	—	—	—	0.8%	—
Leo Olarte	Bigkis Pinoy	—	—	—	1.2%	—	—	0.5%	—
Minguita Padilla	Reporma	—	—	—	1.3%	—	—	1.7%	—
Robin Padilla	PDP–Laban	22.33%	**29.0%**	26%	35.6%	25.07%	29.2%	35.9%	**33.0%**
Salvador Panelo	PDP–Laban	18.27%	5.0%	—	5.6%	—	6.4%	5.2%	—
Astra Pimentel-Naik	PDP–Laban	—	—	—	14.9%	—	9.0%	11.0%	—
Emmanuel Piñol	NPC	14.67%	6.0%	—	5.2%	—	—	4.4%	—
Willie Ricablanca Jr.	PM	—	—	—	—	—	—	0.4%	—
Harry Roque	PRP	—	—	—	18.7%	24.33%	17.7%	18.5%	18.0%
Nur-Ana Sahidulla	PDDS	5.13%	—	—	—	—	—	0.6%	—
Joed Serrano	Independent	2.00%	—	—	—	—	—	—	—
Jopet Sison	Aksyon	—	—	—	5.8%	—	—	7.6%	—
Gilbert Teodoro	PRP	26.40%	9.0%	—	9.9%	23.00%	9.2%	12.9%	—
Antonio Trillanes	Liberal	15.27%	21.0%	20%	27.0%	—	19.0%	16.8%	16.0%
Raffy Tulfo	Independent	**46.33%**	**60.0%**	**47%**	**60.0%**	**41.67%**	**54.3%**	**66.1%**	**62.9%**
Rey Valeros	Independent	—	—	—	—	—	—	0.2%	—
Joel Villanueva	Independent	**34.20%**	**27.0%**	25%	**41.6%**	**33.27%**	25.6%	**40.4%**	29.0%
Mark Villar	Nacionalista	**37.07%**	**40.0%**	**36%**	**53.1%**	**35.27%**	**36.8%**	**52.9%**	**33.0%**
Carmen Zubiaga	Independent	—	—	—	—	—	—	0.4%	—
Migz Zubiri	Independent	**39.87%**	**44.0%**	**29%**	**49.4%**	**37.40%**	**42.3%**	**50.3%**	**38.0%**
Don't know					3.2%			1.2%	
Refused					0.3%			1.2%	
None					1.2%			0.9%	
Invalid votes (13 or more names)									

==== Before filing of candidacies ====
This list includes all individuals named by at least 10% of respondents in any of the surveys.

Candidate	Party	Nov 23–Dec 2, 2020 Pulse	Feb 22–Mar 3, 2021 Pulse	Mar 20–29, 2021 Publicus	Jun 7–16, 2021 Pulse	Jul 13–19, 2021 Publicus	Jul 24–31, 2021 MBC	Sep 6–11, 2021 Pulse	Sep 12–16, 2021 SWS
Bam Aquino	Liberal	19.9%	19.5%	—	18.7%	17.1%	22.6%	28.3%	19.0%
Jejomar Binay	UNA	—	27.1%	—	30.5%	—	26.9%	29.5%	16.0%
Alan Peter Cayetano	Nacionalista	**46.0%**	**44.4%**	21.4%	**46.0%**	27.3%	**41.7%**	**53.6%**	**38.0%**
Mike Defensor	PRP	15.2%	14.5%	20.9%	16.6%	23.4%	14.8%	15.3%	—
Leila de Lima	Liberal	6.0%	4.8%	—	7.5%	—	9.9%	7.3%	7.0%
Monsour del Rosario	Reporma	—	—	—	—	—	—	—	2.0%
Chel Diokno	Independent	8.5%	6.2%	14.4%	5.6%	16.9%	8.2%	6.1%	—
Ces Drilon	Independent	—	8.3%	—	10.4%	—	19.7%	—	—
Paolo Duterte	NUP	22.3%	16.2%	14.5%	16.4	—	17.1	—	—
Sara Duterte	HNP	**50.9%**	**47.5%**	**30.7%**	**47.7%**	27.5%	26.5%	—	—
JV Ejercito	NPC	22.8%	22.7%	—	19.4%	—	18.0%	22.4%	19.0%
Francis Escudero	NPC	**46.7%**	**46.6%**	**57.7%**	**45.6%**	**60.4%**	**33.9%**	**47.9%**	**41.0%**
Jinggoy Estrada	PMP	28.0%	30.1%	—	33.3%	—	25.2%	29.4%	**29.0%**
Win Gatchalian	NPC	28.1%	28.1%	24.0%	23.4%	24.2%	20.7%	25.4%	21.0%
Richard J. Gordon	Independent	26.9%	26.0%	—	22.5%	—	18.9%	23.9%	21.0%
Gregorio Honasan	Independent	22.5%	18.2%	—	17.8%	—	20.4%	19.8%	19.0%
Risa Hontiveros	Akbayan	27.0%	23.9%	**30.5%**	21.8%	**31.7%**	21.4%	25.1%	**25.0%**
Panfilo Lacson	Reporma	**38.2%**	**38.1%**	18.7%	**35.7%**	22.5%	**30.7%**	**40.5%**	—
Mark Lapid	Aksyon	20.4%	13.8%	—	16.5%	—	21.8%	19.0%	—
Loren Legarda	NPC	**45.6%**	**46.2%**	22.3%	**38.8%**	**29.8%**	**28.0%**	**47.2%**	**41.0%**
Teodoro Locsin Jr.	PDP–Laban	—	—	14.3%	—	20.6%	—	—	—
Bongbong Marcos	Nacionalista	**41.8%**	**40.7%**	**27.5%**	**39.7%**	29.2%	**28.0%**	**40.2%**	—
Isko Moreno	Aksyon	**48.4%**	**53.0%**	**68.9%**	**53.7%**	**70.0%**	**28.8%**	**42.3%**	—
Karlo Nograles	PDP–Laban	13.2%	9.3%	—	6.3%	—	5.7%	5.5%	4.0%
Willie Ong	Aksyon	—	19.6%	**63.3%**	20.6%	**60.3%**	26.9%	19.8%	—
Manny Pacquiao	PDP–Laban	**62.1%**	**58.9%**	**66.3%**	**54.0%**	**40.5%**	**31.5**	**42.2%**	—
Francis Pangilinan	Liberal	27.9%	26.9%	21.3%	22.8%	22.4%	19.0%	26.8%	**28.0%**
Willie Revillame	Independent	—	**34.3%**	—	**34.8%**	—	**34.3%**	**36.6%**	**25.0%**
Martin Romualdez	Lakas	6.8%	2.7%	14.7%	4.4%	20.1%	5.1%	3.9%	—
Harry Roque	PRP	18.4%	12.6%	13.2%	10.4%	16.5%	11.7%	9.0%	9.0%
Mar Roxas	Liberal	18.5%	21.6%	14.4%	20.5%	22.4%	18.8%	23.0%	—
Vilma Santos	Nacionalista	21.9%	22.6%	22.5%	15.7%	28.7%	15.4%	21.2%	18.0%
Lucy Torres-Gomez	PDP–Laban	8.9%	6.2%	**38.9%**	11.4%	**42.4%**	12.0%	11.4%	11.0%
Antonio Trillanes	Magdalo	18.1%	12.4%	—	17.3%	—	13.5%	16.3%	14.0%
Raffy Tulfo	Independent	**54.3%**	**48.1%**	—	**46.4%**	—	**48.4%**	**55.2%**	**57.0%**
Joel Villanueva	CIBAC	14.3%	18.4%	**26.7%**	18.0%	28.7%	10.6%	24.8%	14.0%
Mark Villar	Nacionalista	25.0%	18.5%	16.4%	19.4%	24.1%	17.0%	**36.2%**	**41.0%**
Migz Zubiri	Independent	**35.7%**	**38.1%**	16.7%	30.6%	18.5%	**29.4%**	28.3%	**34.0%**
Don't know		2.6%	0.9%	—	1.8%	—	—	1.0%	—
Refused		1.7%	1.9%	—	3.3%	—	—	0.7%	—
None		1.5%	1.2%	—	1.4%	—	—	2.1%	6.0%
Invalid votes (13 or more names)		—	—	—	—	—	—	—	—

=== By ranking ===
The surveys done here were done after the campaign period has started on February 8, 2022.

Candidate	Party	Feb 9–15 I&AC	Feb 12–17 OCTA	Feb 18–23 Pulse Asia	Mar 17–21 Pulse Asia	Apr 2–6 OCTA
Abner Afuang	Independent	—	—	41–61	36–48	32–63
Ibrahim Albani	WPP	—	—	38–57	35–44	30–63
Jesus Arranza	Independent	—	—	42–64	48–64	—
Teddy Baguilat	Liberal	28–31	—	36–44	34–44	25–53
Agnes Bailen	Independent	—	—	41–61	45–62	—
Carl Balita	Aksyon	38–40	27–67	35–42	34–44	30–63
Lutgardo Barbo	PDP–Laban	32–37	—	43–64	43–62	32–63
Herbert Bautista	NPC	20	**12–16**	**12–14**	**11–14**	13–17
Greco Belgica	PDDS	32–37	—	40–61	34–44	32–63
Silvestre Bello Jr.	PDP–Laban	—	22–67	32–36	33–42	25–53
Jejomar Binay	UNA	**9–10**	**7–13**	**7–10**	**8–10**	**7–11**
Roy Cabonegro	PLM	—	—	46–64	48–64	—
John Castriciones	PDP–Laban	38–40	—	43–64	45–64	32–63
Alan Peter Cayetano	Independent	**1–2**	**1–6**	**2–4**	**2–5**	**5–7**
Melchor Chavez	WPP	38–40	—	32–35	32–41	26–63
Neri Colmenares	Makabayan	22–25	20–33	24–29	21–25	21–44
David D' Angelo	PLM	—	—	45–64	48–64	35–63
Leila de Lima	Liberal	22–25	19–27	21–27	21–28	21–29
Monsour del Rosario	Reporma	28–31	19–32	26–31	25–31	25–44
Fernando Diaz	PPP	—	—	36–45	49–64	30–63
Chel Diokno	KANP	17–18	20–34	21–24	21–24	19–27
JV Ejercito	NPC	**11–12**	**8–15**	**12–14**	**11–14**	**10–13**
Guillermo Eleazar	Reporma	22–25	16–20	19–20	18–20	14–20
Ernie Ereño	PM	—	—	43–64	48–64	32–63
Francis Escudero	NPC	**1–2**	**2–6**	**5–7**	**2–5**	**4–6**
Luke Espiritu	PLM	—	—	41–64	34–44	28–63
Jinggoy Estrada	PMP	14–16	**7–13**	**10–11**	**11–14**	**7–11**
Baldomero Falcone	DPP	—	—	41–64	49–64	32–63
Larry Gadon	KBL	22–25	21–42	21–28	21–24	18–24
Win Gatchalian	NPC	**7**	**7–12**	**7–10**	**5–7**	**7–12**
Dick Gordon	Bagumbayan	**11–12**	14–18	15–16	15–16	15–22
Samira Gutoc	Aksyon	32–37	27–67	32–38	32–36	25–53
Gregorio Honasan	Independent	17–18	**12–16**	15–16	15–16	14–20
Risa Hontiveros	Akbayan	**8**	**7–13**	**12–14**	**11–14**	**12–14**
RJ Javellana	Independent	—	—	41–64	53–64	—
Nur-Mahal Kiram	Independent	—	—	37–53	37–48	—
Elmer Labog	Makabayan	32–37	—	48–64	48–64	—
Alex Lacson	Ang Kapatiran	26–27	22–67	22–29	24–30	21–29
Rey Langit	PDP–Laban	28–31	23–67	34–41	34–44	28–63
Loren Legarda	NPC	**3–4**	**1–3**	**2–4**	**2–4**	**2–4**
Ariel Lim	Independent	—	—	38–57	43–60	32–63
Emily Mallillin	PPM	—	—	45–64	53–64	—
Rodante Marcoleta	PDP–Laban	14–16	20–34	22–28	24–30	21–38
Francis Leo Marcos	Independent	—	20–34	43–55	25–31	21–40
Sonny Matula	Independent	—	—	35–44	43–55	29–63
Marieta Mindalano-Adam	Katipunan	—	—	43–64	43–55	—
Leo Olarte	Bigkis Pinoy	—	—	41–64	45–62	—
Minguita Padilla	Reporma	32–37	—	36–52	33–43	30–63
Robin Padilla	PDP–Laban	14–16	**7–11**	**5–9**	**8–10**	**6–11**
Salvador Panelo	PDP–Laban	32–37	24–67	32–35	24–31	21–42
Astra Pimentel-Naik	PDP–Laban	—	22–64	21–27	23–30	21–34
Emmanuel Piñol	NPC	26–27	22–67	29–31	31–34	28–63
Willie Ricablanca Jr.	PM	—	—	45–64	45–62	—
Harry Roque	PRP	19	18–26	17–19	18–20	14–20
Nur-Ana Sahidulla	PDDS	—	—	41–64	43–55	32–63
Jopet Sison	Aksyon	—	22–51	29–31	28–32	21–50
Gilbert Teodoro	PRP	**9–10**	17–22	17–19	18–20	15–22
Antonio Trillanes	Liberal	21	16–19	17–20	17	15–21
Raffy Tulfo	Independent	**3–4**	**1–5**	**1**	**1**	**1**
Rey Valeros	Independent	—	—	45–64	45–62	32–63
Joel Villanueva	Independent	13	**9–15**	**8–11**	**8–10**	**7–12**
Mark Villar	Nacionalista	**5–6**	**3–6**	**2–4**	**3–7**	**2–4**
Carmen Zubiaga	Independent	—	—	48–64	45–64	30–63
Migz Zubiri	Independent	**5–6**	**2–6**	**5–7**	**5–7**	**2–5**

== Per party ==
- Parties (excluding independents) with the plurality of seats in boldface.
- Parties (excluding independents) with the majority of seats are shaded by the party color.

=== Seats won ===
- Totals may not add up to 12 due to margin of error.

Date	Pollster	Akbayan	Aksyon	Bagumbayan	KANP	KBL	LP	NP	NPC	PDDS	PDP–Laban	PMP	PRP	Reporma	UNA	Ind
2022
Apr 2–6	OCTA	0	0	0	0	0	0	1	4	0	1	0	1	0	1	4
Mar 30–Apr 6	Publicus Asia	1	0	1	1	0	0	1	3	0	0	0	0	1	0	4
Mar 17–21	Pulse Asia	1	0	0	0	0	0	1	4	0	1	0	1	0	1	4
Mar 9–14	Publicus Asia	1	0	1	1	1	0	1	3	0	1	0	0	0	0	4
Feb 18–23	Pulse Asia	0	0	0	0	0	0	1	4	0	1	0	1	0	1	4
Feb 12–17	OCTA	1	0	0	0	0	0	1	4	0	1	0	1	0	1	3
Feb 11–16	Publicus Asia	1	0	1	1	0	0	1	3	0	0	0	0	1	0	4
Feb 9–15	I&AC	1	0	1	0	0	0	1	4	0	0	0	0	1	1	3
Jan 26–30	RMN–APCORE	1	0	0	0	0	0	1	4	0	1	0	1	0	1	4
Jan 22–30	RP-MDF	1	0	1	0	0	0	1	3	0	0	0	1	1	0	4
Jan 19–24, 2022	Pulse Asia	1	0	0	0	0	0	1	3	0	1	0	1	0	1	4
2021
Dec 11–12	MBC–DZRH	0	0	0	0	0	0	1	4	1	1	0	1	0	1	3
Dec 6–12, 2021	I&AC	1	0	1	0	0	0	1	4	1	0	0	1	0	1	4
Dec 6–10, 2021	Publicus Asia	1	0	1	0	0	1	1	4	1	1	1	0	1	0	4
Dec 1–6, 2021	Pulse Asia	1	0	0	0	0	0	1	4	1	1	1	0	0	1	4
Nov 23–29, 2021	RMN–APCORE	1	0	0	1	0	0	1	4	1	1	0	0	1	0	4
Oct 20–23, 2021	SWS	1	1	1	0	0	0	1	4	0	1	1	0	0	1	4
Oct 11–18, 2021	Publicus Asia	1	1	1	1	0	0	1	4	0	0	0	1	0	0	5
Sep 12–16, 2021	SWS	1	0	0	0	0	2	3	4	0	0	1	0	0	1	5

=== Seats after the election ===
Totals may not add up to 24 due to margin of error.

Date	Pollster	Akbayan	Aksyon	Bagumbayan	CIBAC	KANP	KBL	Lakas	LDP	LP	NP	NPC	PDDS	PDP–Laban	Reporma	PMP	PRP	UNA	Ind
2022
Mar 30–Apr 6	Publicus Asia	1	0	1	0	1	1	1	1	0	4	**6**	1	4	0	0	1	1	5
Mar 9–14	Publicus Asia	1	0	1	0	1	1	1	1	0	4	**5**	1	4	0	0	2	1	5
Feb 18–23	Pulse Asia	1	0	1	0	0	0	1	1	0	4	**6**	1	4	0	1	0	2	6
Feb 12–17	OCTA	1	0	0	0	0	0	1	1	0	4	**6**	0	5	0	1	0	2	6
Feb 11–16	Publicus Asia	1	0	1	0	1	0	1	1	0	4	**6**	1	4	0	1	1	2	5
Feb 9–15	I&AC	1	0	1	0	0	0	1	1	0	4	**5**	1	4	0	0	1	2	5
Jan 26–30	RMN–APCORE	1	0	0	0	0	0	1	1	0	4	**6**	1	4	0	1	0	2	5
Jan 19–24, 2022	Pulse Asia	1	0	0	0	0	0	1	1	0	4	**5**	1	4	0	1	0	2	5
2021
Dec 11–12, 2021	MBC–DZRH	1	0	0	0	0	0	1	1	0	4	**5**	2	4	0	1	0	2	5
Dec 6–12, 2021	I&AC	1	0	1	1	0	0	1	1	0	4	**5**	2	4	0	0	1	2	4
Dec 6–10, 2021	Publicus Asia	1	0	1	0	1	1	0	1	0	4	**5**	2	4	1	0	0	1	5
Dec 1–6, 2021	Pulse Asia	1	0	0	0	0	0	1	1	0	4	**5**	2	4	0	1	0	2	5
Nov 23–29, 2021	RMN–APCORE	1	0	0	1	0	0	1	1	1	**4**	**4**	2	4	0	1	0	2	4
Oct 20–23, 2021	SWS	1	1	1	0	0	0	1	1	0	4	**5**	1	4	0	1	0	2	5
Oct 11–18, 2021	Publicus Asia	1	1	1	0	1	0	1	1	0	4	**5**	1	4	0	0	1	1	6
Sep 12–16, 2021	SWS	1	0	0	0	0	0	1	1	2	**6**	5	1	3	0	1	0	2	6
Jun 30, 2019	Start of 18th Congress	1	0	0	1	0	0	1	1	3	4	3	0	**5**	0	0	0	1	4

=== Per coalition ===
Coalitions are expected to release 12-person slates for the election by the start of campaigning on February 8, 2022. On this section will be the surveys done after that day.

Date	Pollster	Aksyon	LEAD	MP3	Reporma/NPC	TRoPa	Tuloy na Pagbabago	UniTeam	Others
Apr 2–6	OCTA	0	1	8	6	5	4	7	1
Mar 17–21	Pulse Asia	0	1	8	7	5	2	7	1
Mar 9–14	Publicus Asia	0	2	8	7	6	4	7	1
Feb 18–23	Pulse Asia	0	1	9	9	6	3	8	1
Feb 12–17	OCTA	0	1	9	9	6	3	8	1
Feb 11–16	Publicus Asia	0	2	9	8	7	4	7	1
Feb 9–15	I&AC	0	1	9	8	6	4	6	1
