= 1Sambayan =

Electoral coalition in the Philippines led by Antonio Carpio

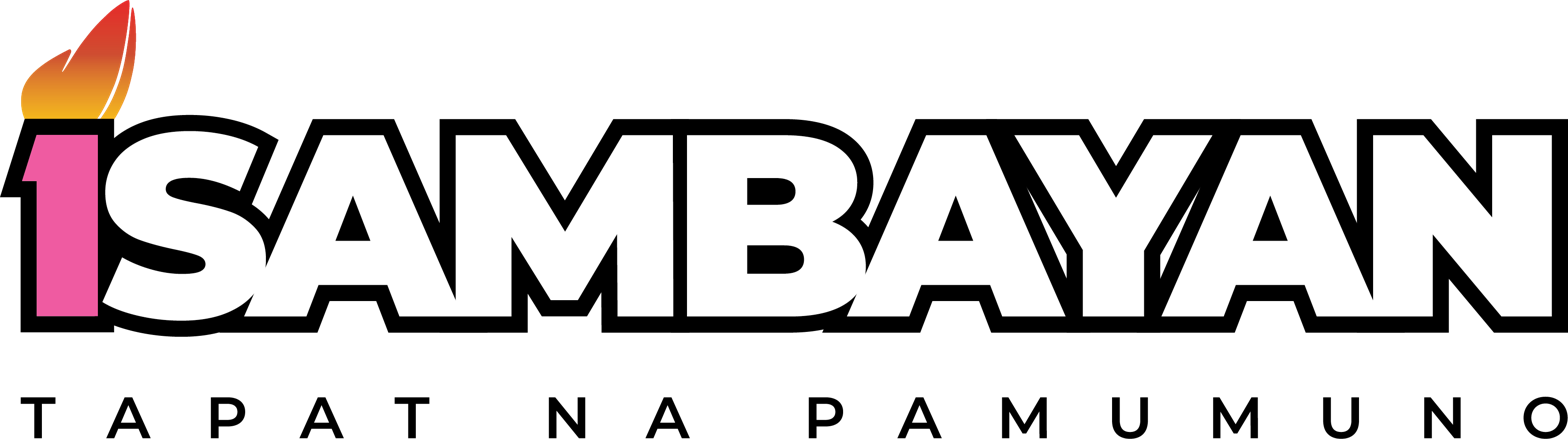
- Lead convenor: Antonio Carpio
- Founder: Antonio Carpio
- Founded: March 14, 2021; 5 years ago
- Headquarters: 2904-West Tower, Tektite Towers, Exchange Rd, Ortigas Center, Pasig, Metro Manila
- Political position: Big tent
- National affiliation: KiBam (2024–2025); TRoPa (2021–2022)
- Colors: Pink

1Sambayan, (read as isambayan) is a political Organization founded by former Supreme Court associate justice Antonio Carpio.

== History ==
=== 2021–2022 ===
1Sambayan's mission is to unite the opposition with placing and support only one candidate for it. Carpio was aiming not to divide the vote, pointing out that the cased when Mayor Rodrigo Duterte won in 2016, due to the fact that DILG Secretary Mar Roxas and Senator Grace Poe are not "united" or one of them withdrawn. Alongside Carpio, the co-convenors of 1Sambayan include lawyer Howard Calleja, former Ombudsman Conchita Carpio-Morales, former Negros Occidental governor Lito Coscolluela, Marikina councilor and labor leader Rene Magtubo, and auditor Heidi Mendoza among others.

1Sambayan formally began its selection process for a presidential and vice-presidential tandem on June 12, 2021, when they announced their six initial nominees. These included senator Grace Poe, vice president Leni Robredo, former senator Antonio Trillanes, human rights lawyer and former senatorial candidate Chel Diokno, incumbent house deputy speaker Vilma Santos-Recto, and CIBAC representative and house deputy speaker Eddie Villanueva. In the middle of 2022, Robredo, Trillanes, and Villanueva expressed their support for unity under 1Sambayan. On September 30, 2021, the 1Sambayan coalition of the opposition nominated Robredo as their standard bearer. Former education secretary Armin Luistro, one of the convenors of the group, announced Robredo's acceptance of the nomination and the filing of her candidacy on October 5. Robredo's spokesman later announced, however, that Robredo had yet to accept the nomination and would be announcing her decision before October 8.

In Senatoriables, only seven of 11 candidates of the Team Robredo–Pangilinan (TRoPa) ticket is endorsed by 1Sambayan including Teddy Baguilat, and Leila de Lima of the Liberal Party, Chel Diokno of the newly formed Katipunan ng Nagkakaisang Pilipino, Risa Hontiveros of Akbayan, Alex Lacson of Ang Kapatiran, Independent Sonny Matula, and Antonio Trillanes from both Magdalo and Liberal. In the middle of campaign, 1sambayan announced the addition of Neri Colmenares and Elmer Labog of Makabayan, Dick Gordon of Bagumbayan–VNP, and Monsour del Rosario of Partido para sa Demokratikong Reporma to their list of senatorial candidates.

=== 2025 elections ===
In January 2025, 1Sambayan formally released list of endorsed senatoriables that include former senators Bam Aquino, and Kiko Pangilinan, ACT Teachers congresswoman France Castro, Labor leaders Luke Espiritu, and Sonny Matula, former Commission on Audit commissioner Heidi Mendoza, Dr. Willie Ong (who later withdrew from the senate race), and retired Philippine Marine Corps officer Ariel Querubin.

For the party-list, 1Sambayan endorsed Castro's ACT Teachers, Hontiveros' Akbayan, Neri Colmenares' Bayan Muna, Bunyog Pagkakaisa, Kabataan, De Lima's Mamamayang Liberal (ML), and Trillanes' Magdalo.
