= Workers' and Peasants' Party (Philippines) =

Political party in the Philippines

Labor Party Philippines
- President: Ariel Joseph Arias
- Secretary-General: Marcelino Arias
- Vice-president: Oscar Morado
- Founded: February 3, 1963
- Headquarters: Makati
- Ideology: Laborism
- Political position: Centre-left
- Colors: Blue, Gold
- Senate: 0 / 24
- House of Representatives: 0 / 317

The Workers' and Peasants' Party (WPP), also known as Labor Party Philippines, Partido ng Manggagawa at Magsasaka (lit. Workers' and Farmers' Party; PMM) and the Lapiang Manggagawa (lit. 'Workers' Party'; LM), is a political party in the Philippines.

== History ==
Post-war politics in the Philippines was dominated by the Nacionalista Party and the Liberal Party, leaving the labour movement unrepresented in the political sphere. The end of WWII also saw the dissolution of the Congress of Labor Organizations, leading to one if its leaders, Cipriano Cid, founding the Philippine Association of Free Labor Unions (PAFLU) in 1952. The following year saw the formation of another trade union federation, the Philippine Trade Union Council (PTUC). In 1957 the Katipunan ng Manggagawang Pilipino (KMP, lit. Confederation of Filipino Workers) was formed by former Federation of Free Workers vice president Ignacio Lacsina. One labor consultant at the US embassy in Manila is quoted as seeing the formation of the KMP as an attempt at turning the "Philippine trade union movement into a labor party, into a political movement". Lacsina was made secretary-general and Roberto Oca, head of the Manila port workers union, president. In June 1959 the confederation was attacked when the Philippine government convicted two of its leaders, both with established ties to the Partido Komunista ng Pilipinas (PKP), of rebellion. Seizing the moment, multiple member unions demanded the expulsion of communist elements in the KMP leadership. After Oca and Lacsina refused to comply many members left the organisation leaving its strength "dramatically reduced".

The early 60s saw rising unemployment and underemployment. Inflation surged after president Macapagal's decontrol of the peso in early 1962. The KMP, along with the majority of labor organizations at the time, had supported the campaign of former president Carlos P. Garcia. His defeat spurred on the efforts to transform the labor movement into its own political party. The internal founding congresses of the Workers' and Peasants' Party (WPP) were held from January to March 1962. By April its leadership had drafted a constitution and was set to present it publicly on May 1, but this was pushed back due to government repression. Over the following months the PKP pushed the WPP into collaboration with Mascapagal's Liberal Party. Due to his alignment with the López brothers, strong political adversaries of Mascapagal, Roberto Oca's removal from the WPP was one of the conditions for the proposed party merger. But in October 1962 the WPP announced that after the unexpected death of Manila mayor Arsenio Lacson, Oca would be its mayoral candidate.

On February 3, 1963 the WPP was officially founded, combining a majority of the country's trade union federations into an independent political party. Cipriano Cid was made president, Lascino general secretary, Oca and Jose Hernandez vice presidents and Joma Sison was elected as vice president for propaganda handling the party's research, education and press.

=== Manila Port Strike of 1963 ===
In the fall of 1962, the port workers' union (Philippine Transportation and General Workers Organization, PTGWO) under Roberto Oca staged multiple short strikes as part of their contract negotiation with the government-run Manila Port Service responsible for the South Harbor. Macapagal, who intended to use the strikes as pretext to crush the union and displace its leadership, tried to outlaw the union and publicly denounced Oca, who in turn threatened a general strike, which would have been the first in the country's history. Through a last minute bargain the open conflict could be avoided but the rift between Oca and Macapagal widened. After using the threat of a general strike planned for May 1963 as leverage, Lascino and Sison procured the long-sought merger of the WPP with the Liberal Party. Oca, whose bid for mayor of Manila was opposed by the Liberal Party, found out about these negotiations and shortly after was replaced as vice president of the WPP by PKP member Felixberto Olalia.

Amid changing legal status and a leadership struggle the port workers started picketing on May 7. By July 10 the strike had turned bloody when scabs threw makeshift bombs over the picketing line injuring 37 and severely wounding two. The following day Oca announced that the picket line would be lifted for 15 days, later extending it until August 2nd after failing to convince the striking workers to accept a compromise settlement offered by the Macapagal government. On August 6, the WPP officially merged with the Liberal Party, further enraging the striking workers who were picketing against the latter. Oca, in a move seen by some workers as repeated sabotage of the strike, once again lifted the picket line from August 9 to 12. On August 12th, the strikebreakers with the help of government-backed paramilitary forces, assaulted the picketing workers, breaking the line and murdering two workers. The day after, Oca officially became the mayoral candidate for the Nacionalista Party, dropping all prior claims to represent the WPP and using the killed workers' wakes as political rallies for his newfound party. By mid-August the strike was estimated to be the most expensive strike in the country's history and it was declared a "national crisis" by Vice President Emmanuel Pelaez.

After August 23, the strike intermittently resumed and paused multiple times all throughout the next month. Oca was ordering the strikers to stop but the government was not yet allowing the workers to return to their old jobs. By September many of the port workers were reportedly on the verge of starvation, receiving no strike pay. On September 25, Oca struck a deal with the newly appointed customs secretary, returning 75% of workers back to their old jobs, effectively ending the PTGWO strike the next day on September 26. Though it wasn't until October 12th that work on the port resumed due to a short-lived strike by the former strikebreakers for not receiving more of the PTGWO's jobs.

=== Breakaways ===
When Macapagal sought to strengthen his ties with the USA in 1964, the WPP, now integrated in the Liberal Party but still under the direction of Lascino and Sison, arranged its realignment with the former enemy, the Nacionalista Party and its candidate for the upcoming elections, Ferdinand Marcos. It failed and the organization effectively dissipated. Lascina later tried to resurrect some elements of the party in 1967 under the name of the Socialist Party of the Philippines.

=== Contemporary history ===
Some founders carried on the "Lapiang Manggagawa" name. The party registered with the Commission on Elections in 1983. The party supported the Corazon Aquino-Salvador Laurel ticket in the 1986 presidential election. In the 1992 elections, the party merged with the Lakas-NUCD. For the 1998 elections, the party merged with the Partido ng Demokratikong Reporma (Party for Democratic Reform).

For the 2010 presidential election, the party announced its nomination of Secretary of Public Works and Highways Hermogenes Ebdane for president. Ebdane accepted the nomination in November 2009, but withdrew from the presidential race in December 2009. Ebdane ran instead for the governorship of Zambales; he won, defeating Governor Amor Deloso. In 2012 Zambales' 2nd district special election, Ebdane's son Jun Omar successfully defended the district's seat in the House of Representatives of the Philippines against Deloso's daughter and from deceased Antonio M. Diaz's daughter, who ran under the Nacionalista Party.

For the 2016 presidential election, the party nominated former ambassador and House representative for OFW Family Club Roy Señeres. Señeres was in the initial list of official candidates. However, he withdrew on February 5, 2016. Seneres eventually died of a heart attack three days later. Despite his withdrawal and death, he still remained on the ballot. The party presented Apolonia Soguilon as his substitute, but was rejected because she had a different surname. Ultimately, Señeres still received around 22,000 votes in the election.

The party fielded candidates for the 2019 senatorial election. PMM's ticket consisted of Shariff Albani, Gerald Arcega, Marcelino Arias, Melchor Chavez, Sonny Matula, and Luther Meniano.

The party supported Bongbong Marcos during the 2022 presidential election as cited by its unified national convention with the Partido Lakas ng Manggagawang Pilipino (PLMP) in Clark Freeport Zone, Pampanga.

== Electoral candidates ==
=== 1987 Philippine Senate election ===
- Jacinto Tamayo (Note: As Lapiang Manggagawa.) (lost)
- Bienvenido Medrano (lost)

=== 1998 Philippine presidential election ===
- Renato de Villa (as president; lost)
- Oscar Orbos (as vice president; lost)

=== 2010 Philippine presidential election ===
- Jun Ebdane (as president; withdrew)

=== 2016 Philippine general elections ===
- Roy Señeres (as president; withdrew)
- Melchor Chavez (as senator; lost)
- Aldin Ali (as senator; lost)

=== 2019 Philippine Senate election ===
- Abner Afuang (lost)
- Shariff Albani (lost)
- Gerald Arcega (lost)
- Marcelino Arias (lost)
- Melchor Chavez (lost)
- Junbert Guigayuma (lost)
- Sonny Matula (lost)
- Luther Meniano (lost)

=== 2022 Philippine general election ===
- Manny SD Lopez (as vice president; lost)
- Ibrahim Albani (as senator; lost)
- Melchor Chavez (as senator; lost)

=== 2025 Philippine Senate election ===
- Sonny Matula
- Subair Mustapha

== Electoral performance ==
=== Presidential and vice presidential elections ===
Year	Presidential election			Vice presidential election		
Year	Candidate	Vote share	Result	Candidate	Vote share	Result
1998	Renato de Villa	4.86%	Joseph Estrada (PMP)	Oscar Orbos	13.00%	Gloria Macapagal Arroyo (Lakas–NUCDA)
2004	None (Note: supported Raul Roco for president.)		Gloria Macapagal Arroyo (Lakas–CMD)	None (Note: supported Herminio Aquino for vice president.)		Noli de Castro (Independent)
2010	Hermogenes Ebdane (Note: Ebdane withdrew from the presidential race and instead ran for the Zambales governorship.)	N/A	Benigno Aquino III (Liberal)	None		Jejomar Binay (PDP–Laban)
2016	Roy Señeres (Note: Señeres withdrew from the presidential race shortly before his death.)	0.06%	Rodrigo Duterte (PDP–Laban)	None		Leni Robredo (Liberal)
2022	None (Note: The Workers' and Peasants' Party endorsed Bongbong Marcos for president.)		Bongbong Marcos (PFP)	Manny SD Lopez	0.31%	Sara Duterte (Lakas-CMD)

=== Legislative elections ===
Congress of the Philippines
House of Representatives			Senate			
Year	Seats won	Result	Year	Seats won	Ticket	Result
1995	0 / 204	Lakas–Laban majority	1995	Did not participate		Lakas–Laban win 9/12 seats
1998	0 / 258	Lakas plurality	1998	Did not participate		LAMMP win 7/12 seats
2001	Did not participate	Lakas plurality	2001	Did not participate		People Power win 8/13 seats
2004	Did not participate	Lakas plurality	2004	Did not participate		K4 win 7/12 seats
2007	Did not participate	Lakas plurality	2007	Did not participate		GO win 8/12 seats
2010	1 / 286	Lakas plurality	2010	Did not participate		Liberal win 4/12 seats
2013	Did not participate	Liberal plurality	2013	Did not participate		Team PNoy win 9/12 seats
2016	Did not participate	Liberal plurality	2016	0 / 12	Single party ticket	Daang Matuwid win 7/12 seats
2019	0 / 304	PDP–Laban plurality	2019	0 / 12	Single party ticket	Hugpong win 9/12 seats
2022	0 / 316	PDP–Laban plurality	2022	0 / 12	Single party ticket	UniTeam win 6/12 seats
2025	0 / 317	Lakas plurality	2025	0 / 12	Single party ticket	Bagong Pilipinas win 6/12 seats
