= Team Robredo–Pangilinan =

Defunct political alliance of opposition in the Philippines

- Abbreviation: TRoPa
- Leader: Leni Robredo
- Senate leader: Risa Hontiveros
- Campaign manager: Bam Aquino
- Founded: 2021
- Dissolved: 2022
- Preceded by: Otso Diretso
- Succeeded by: KiBam
- Headquarters: Katipunan Avenue, Quezon City, Metro Manila
- Ideology: Social liberalism; Conservative liberalism; Factions: Social democracy; Progressivism; Christian democracy; Conservatism; Filipino nationalism
- Political position: Big tent; Factions: Centre-left to centre-right
- Coalition members: Liberal; Akbayan; KANP; Ang Kapatiran; Magdalo; Guest parties: NUP; Reporma (Alvarez faction)
- Colors: Pink; Green
- Slogan: Gobyernong Tapat, Angat Buhay Lahat transl. [With] honest government, a better life for all

Team Robredo–Pangilinan (TRoPa), also known as Tropang Angat, was an electoral alliance that supported Philippine vice president Leni Robredo's presidential campaign and Senator Francis Pangilinan's vice presidential campaign in the 2022 Philippine general election. Its senatorial slate included members of the Liberal Party, Akbayan, Katipunan ng Nagkakaisang Pilipino, and Ang Kapatiran. Guest candidates in the TRoPa slate are members of Bagumbayan–VNP, Nationalist People's Coalition, and United Nationalist Alliance.

== Branding ==
Robredo used the pink color while campaigning instead of yellow which associated with the Aquinos and Lakas ng Bayan (later PDP–Laban). Robredo also ran as an independent.

== Senatorial slate ==
Robredo and her running mate, Kiko Pangilinan, endorsed the following candidates for the 2022 Philippine Senate election, thus making up the campaign's senatorial slate. Senate Majority Leader Migz Zubiri was initially part of the slate; however, he was removed on April 27, 2022, after a campaign against his inclusion in the roster was started by Robredo supporters in early April shortly after he endorsed Robredo's opponent, Bongbong Marcos.

Candidate name and party	Position	Votes	%	Rank	Elected
Teddy Baguilat; Liberal	Former House representative from Ifugao (2010–2019)	4,275,873	7.70	28th	No
Jejomar Binay; UNA (Note: Guest candidate)	Former Vice President (2010–2016)	13,263,970	23.88	13th	No
Leila de Lima; Liberal	Incumbent senator	7,278,602	13.10	23rd	No
Chel Diokno; KANP	Lawyer	9,978,444	17.96	19th	No
Francis Escudero; NPC	Incumbent governor of Sorsogon	20,271,458	36.49	5th	Yes
Dick Gordon; Bagumbayan–VNP	Incumbent senator	8,377,893	15.08	22nd	No
Risa Hontiveros; Akbayan	Incumbent senator	15,420,807	27.76	11th	Yes
Alex Lacson; Ang Kapatiran	Lawyer	5,477,088	9.86	25th	No
Sonny Matula; Independent	Lawyer	2,692,565	4.85	36th	No
Antonio Trillanes; Liberal	Former senator (2007–2019)	8,630,272	15.54	21st	No
Joel Villanueva; Independent	Incumbent senator	18,486,034	33.28	9th	Yes
Turnout		55,549,791	—		
Votes garnered		114,153,006	26.50		
Total votes		430,721,882	100		
Source: COMELEC (partial official results based on 172 out of 173 certificates of canvass)

=== Results by island group ===
==== Luzon ====
Candidate	Party	Votes	%	Rank	Top 12
Chiz Escudero	NPC	13,017,196	42.10%	4	Yes
Joel Villanueva	Independent	11,862,450	38.37%	6	Yes
Risa Hontiveros	Akbayan	9,841,618	31.83%	9	Yes
Jojo Binay	UNA	8,165,001	26.41%	13	No
Chel Diokno	KANP	7,168,505	23.19%	16	No
Antonio Trillanes	Liberal	5,908,504	19.11%	20	No
Dick Gordon	BVNP	5,272,578	17.05%	22	No
Leila de Lima	Liberal	5,179,753	16.75%	23	No
Alex Lacson	KP	3,566,436	11.54%	25	No
Teddy Baguilat	Liberal	3,259,453	10.54%	26	No
Sonny Matula	Independent	2,064,492	6.68%	32	No
Turnout		30,917,665	100.00%		

==== Visayas ====
Candidate	Party	Votes	%	Rank	Top 12
Chiz Escudero	NPC	3,685,995	31.93%	8	Yes
Risa Hontiveros	Akbayan	3,405,425	29.50%	9	Yes
Joel Villanueva	Independent	3,352,182	29.04%	10	Yes
Jojo Binay	UNA	2,368,885	20.52%	14	No
Dick Gordon	BVNP	1,858,198	16.10%	17	No
Chel Diokno	KANP	1,807,796	15.66%	19	No
Antonio Trillanes	Liberal	1,757,776	15.23%	20	No
Leila de Lima	Liberal	1,405,845	12.18%	23	No
Alex Lacson	KP	1,131,117	9.80%	25	No
Teddy Baguilat	Liberal	637,830	5.53%	33	No
Sonny Matula	Independent	383,369	3.32%	36	No
Turnout		11,542,445	100.00%		

==== Mindanao ====
Candidate	Party	Votes	%	Rank	Top 12
Chiz Escudero	NPC	3,307,589	25.65%	10	Yes
Joel Villanueva	Independent	3,128,668	24.26%	12	Yes
Jojo Binay	UNA	2,714,101	21.04%	14	No
Risa Hontiveros	Akbayan	2,058,930	15.96%	17	Yes
Dick Gordon	BVNP	1,155,822	8.96%	22	No
Chel Diokno	KANP	908,629	7.05%	25	No
Antonio Trillanes	Liberal	880,183	6.82%	26	No
Alex Lacson	KP	726,402	5.63%	31	No
Leila de Lima	Liberal	619,886	4.81%	33	No
Teddy Baguilat	Liberal	308,626	2.39%	39	No
Sonny Matula	Independent	192,234	1.49%	47	No
Turnout		12,896,983	100.00%		

== See also ==
- UniTeam, the main rival of the Team Robredo–Pangilinan in the 2022 elections
