= Melchor Chavez =

Filipino politician (born 1951)

- Born: August 6, 1951 (age 75); Kidapawan, Cotabato
- Political party: Labor Party Philippines
- Other political affiliations: Kilusang Bagong Lipunan (until 2016)
- Spouse: Susana Pacheco Chavez

Melchor "Mel" Gongora Chavez is a Filipino politician and perennial candidate and radio and print journalist.

== Early life ==
Chavez was born on August 6, 1951, in Kidapawan.

== Career ==
Melchor Chavez had tried to run for senator in past elections. In 1992, the Supreme Court disqualified him from running for senator.

In 1998, Comelec did not give due course to his certificate of candidacy.

In 2001, Chavez ran as the official candidate of the KBL; he garnered a measly 2% of the total votes cast. COMELEC allowed him to run again.

In 2004, with fellow Kilusang Bagong Lipunan candidate Oliver Lozano, but allies of another Chavez—Alyansa ng Pag-Asa candidate Francisco Chavez, the same candidate who questioned Melchor’s candidacy in 1992—sought Melchor’s disqualification. COMELEC eventually declared Chavez as a nuisance candidate.

In 2016, alongside Aldin Ali, he went under the PMM ticket, where he is the leader, but again failed to win a seat in the Senate.

In 2019, Melchor Chavez tried to get a senatorial seat, but he got 39th, with 759,911 votes.

In 2022, Melchor Chavez ran again for Senator in the party and coalition WPP. But he got 43rd, with 953,241 votes or 1.72% of the votes.
