= Alex Lacson =

Filipino author (born 1965)

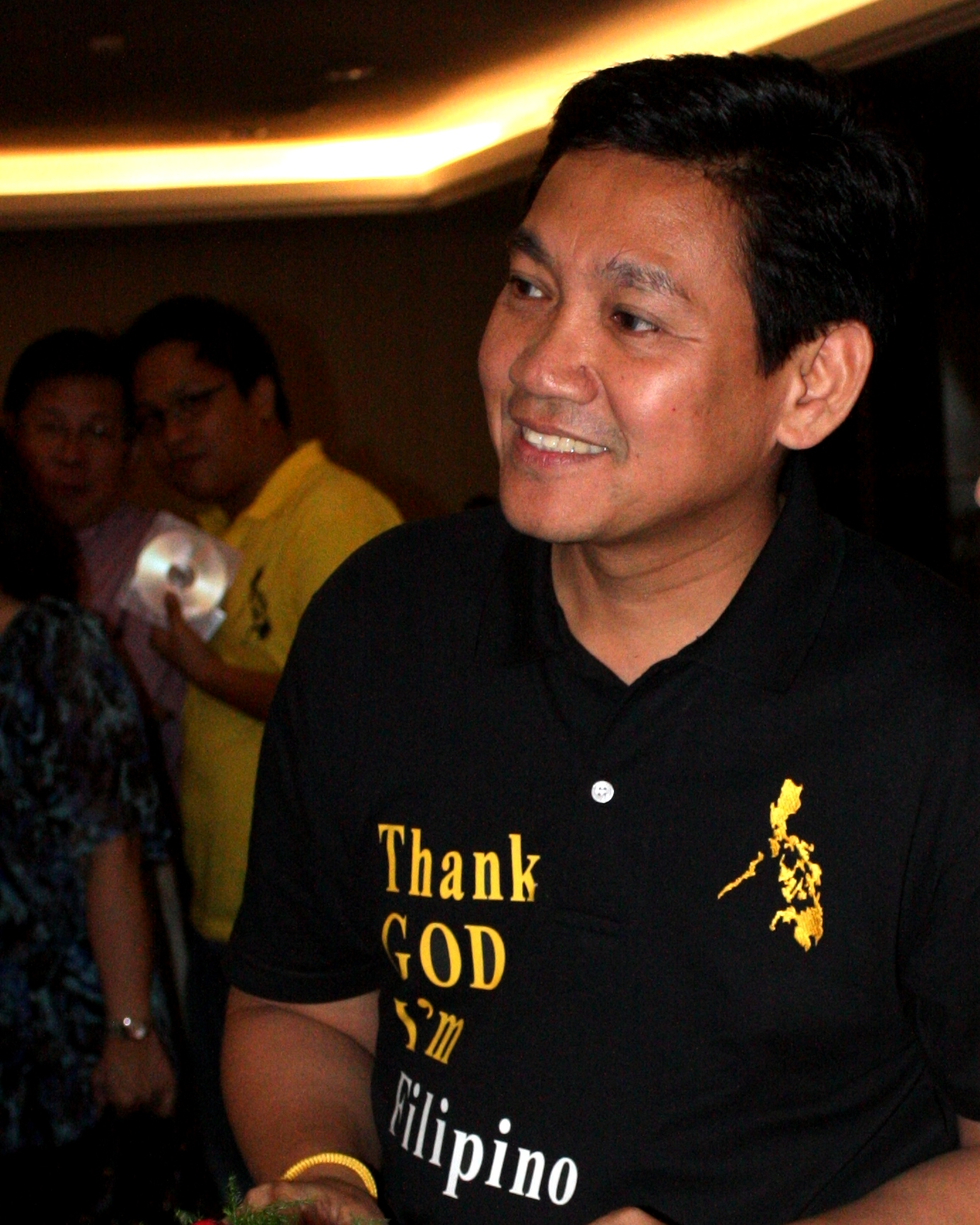

Personal details
- Born: January 5, 1965 (age 61) Kabankalan, Philippines
- Party: Ang Kapatiran (2021–present)
- Other political affiliations: Liberal (2009–2021)
- Spouse: Pia Peña
- Children: 4
- Education: Philippine Military Academy; University of the Philippines Diliman (BA, JD)
- Website: Official website

Alexander Ledesma Lacson (born January 5, 1965) is a Filipino bestselling author of patriotic books, a poet, lawyer, businessman, civil society leader, and NGO leader. He is best known as the bestselling author of the books 12 Little Things Every Filipino Can Do to Help Our Country and Five Hundred Years Without Love, for the poem "I am Filipino" and for running in the 2010 Philippine Senate election.

== Early life ==
Lacson was born on January 5, 1965 in Kabankalan, Negros Occidental, the sixth of eight children. His mother, Fe Tenefrancia Ledesma, was a public school teacher who taught second grade in the barrios of Kabankalan. His father, Jose Ramos Lacson, had only a high school education and became a land surveyor then a businessman. Lacson's parents separated when he was in high school.

Lacson graduated fifth in his class at Esteban R. Abada Memorial School (ERAMS) in Kabankalan in 1978. He went on to graduate from Kabankalan Catholic College in 1982, where he was the salutatorian and student council president.

Two major events during his childhood helped shape his outlook. The first was the imprisonment of one of his closest friends, Father Vicente Dangan, leader of the Kristiyanong Katilingban of Kabankalan (KKK; Christian Community of Kabankalan) and parish priest of the church where Lacson was an altar server. When nine peasant leaders of the KKK were killed and buried in the hacienda of the Kabankalan mayor Pablo G. Sola, Father Dangan was among the first to condemn it. When Sola was ambushed and killed in 1982 by members of the New People's Army, Father Dangan was among the accused and imprisoned.

The second formative event for Lacson was a one-week suspension at his high school after he led a boycott of classes in 1982, around two months before graduation. After a classmate was threatened and verbally abused by the husband of a faculty member, Lacson and the classmate's parents demanded an apology which school authorities refused. After weeks of inaction, Lacson, as the class president, led a school-wide boycott of classes for several days. Until then, Lacson had been valedictorian of his class, but after the boycott, his deportment grade went down and he graduated as salutatorian.

== Education ==
After finishing high school in 1982, Lacson received a full scholarship at the Philippine Military Academy in Baguio. He studied there for three years before transferring to the University of the Philippines Diliman (UPD), where he earned a bachelor's degree in political science in 1991. In order to finance his studies at UPD, he worked as a professor's assistant by day and a telemarketer by night. He also received help from his sister, who was working in Japan. When he entered the University of the Philippines College of Law, he decided to work full-time during the day and study at night; he graduated in 1996.

As a student, Lacson was the leader of three campus organizations. He was president of the Association of Political Science Majors, chairman of the Independent Student Alliance political party, and lord chancellor of the Alpha Phi Beta fraternity at the UP College of Law. He was also a member of the UP Law debate team, which defeated the Ateneo Law School team in 1992 in a competition hosted by the Association of Law Schools of the Philippines.

In 2002, Lacson took a short summer program at Harvard Law School. In 2007, he attended a month-long Christian leadership training at the Haggai Institute in Singapore, where he delivered the valedictory address for graduates from more than 30 countries.

== Political campaigns ==
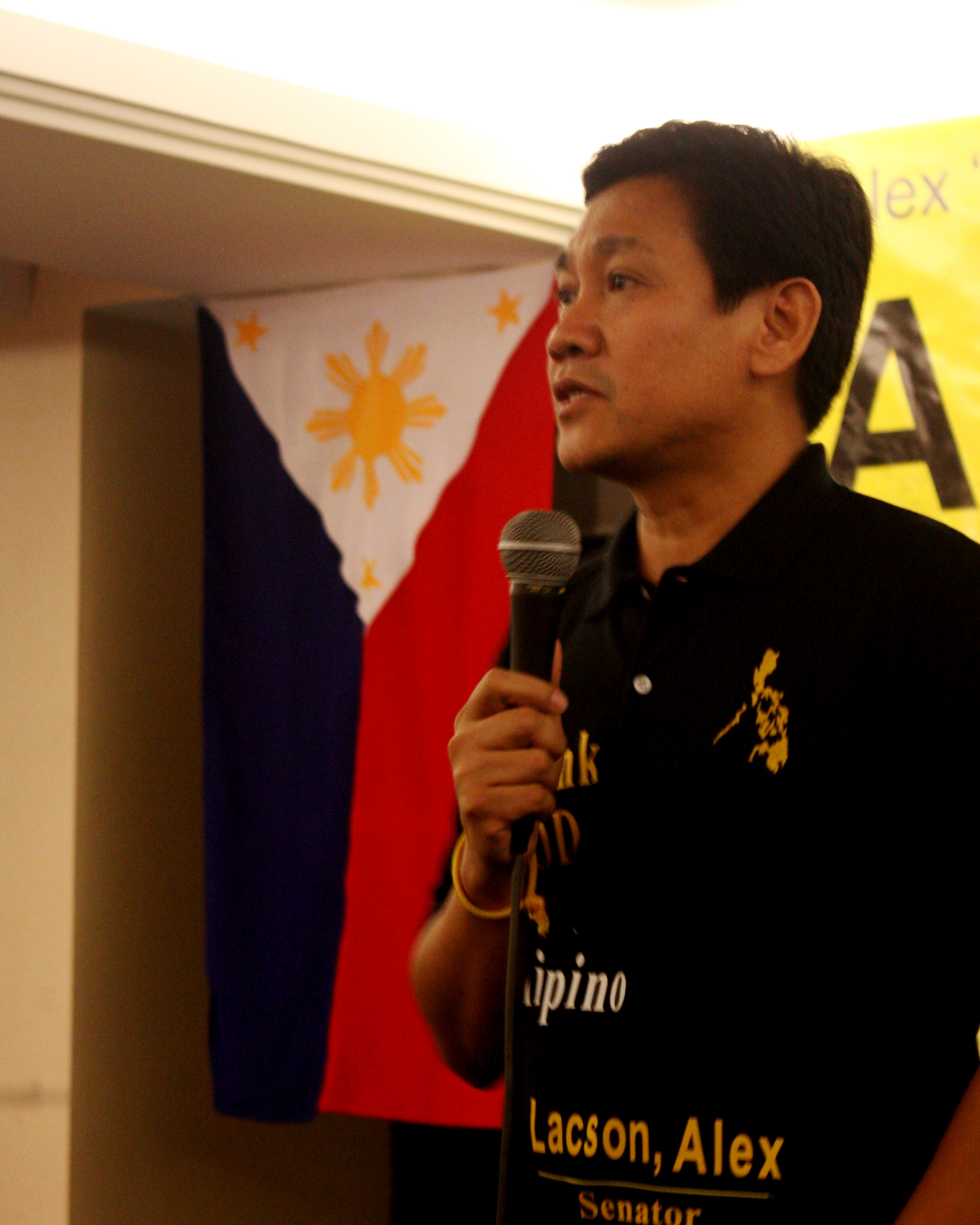
Lacson at a campaign event in March 2010.

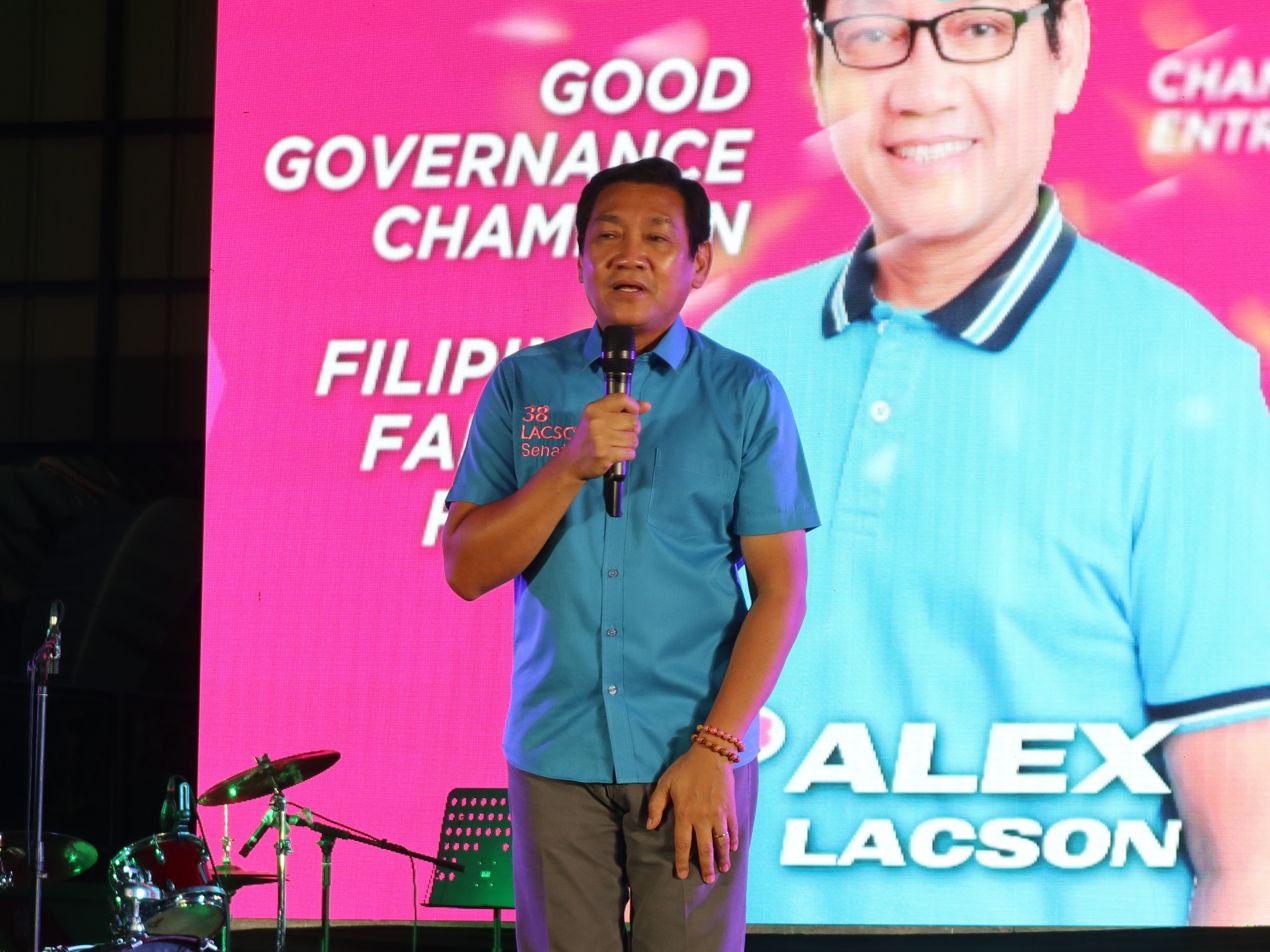
Lacson at a youth grand rally in Quezon City, April 2, 2022

In 2001, Lacson unsuccessfully ran for Congress in the sixth district of Negros Occidental, under the People Power Coalition that toppled President Joseph Estrada.

In 2010, he ran for the Senate under the Liberal Party coalition of Benigno Aquino III, whom Lacson had been instrumental in convincing to run for the presidency. He focused his campaign on honesty in government, employment, education, environmental protection, support for migrant workers, and the cultivation of a Filipino culture that would spur national development. The writer Lester Cavestany summed up Lacson's legislative platform in three points: educational support, scholarship, and "faith in the Filipino".

He lost again but was offered a position in the Aquino administration, which he declined. Instead, Lacson founded the Kabayanihan Foundation to promote patriotism and good citizenship.

In 2022, he ran as senator under Ang Kapatiran and was supported by the 1Sambayan coalition. He was also named to the Team Robredo–Pangilinan senatorial slate of Vice President Leni Robredo. However, he lost once again.

== Advocacy and philanthropy ==
Lacson is the current chairman of the Civil Service Commission's Advisory Council, which is composed of leaders in various sectors who help the Civil Service Commission improve its systems, operations, and quality of public service. He is a member of the boards of trustees of World Vision Philippines, Alay Buhay Community Development Inc., the Dilaab Foundation, and the Joey Velasco Foundation.

He is also the lead convenor of the Pilipino Movement for Transformational Leadership (PMTL), a coalition of faith-based organizations from Catholic, Protestant, and Evangelical groups that aims to elect honest, competent, and dedicated public servants. During the 2016 national elections, the group created the Gabay Kristo ("Christ Guide"), a scorecard that it used as a voter's guide for all the member organizations of the PMTL.

Since 2001, Lacson has been supporting scholars in Kabankalan, including the children of some of his own high school classmates. He has also been supporting scholars under World Vision since 2007. He and his wife established a foundation to help underprivileged children through school, which is now subsidizing 27 students in public schools in Lacson’s province of Negros Occidental.

== Legal and business work ==
Lacson was the CEO of the Institute for Solidarity in Asia (ISA), which implements good-governance programs in local and national government agencies in the Philippines. He is also a co-founder and partner at the Malcolm Law Offices in Ortigas.

He served as a legal counsel for the United Nations Development Programme (UNDP) in the Philippines from 1997 to 2004, and wrote a weekly legal column in the BusinessWorld newspaper from 1996 to 2004. He also served as a court attorney under Supreme Court Justice Teodoro Padilla, studying and drafting court decisions.

Lacson is currently the chairman and CEO of a family food business in Manila. He is also the president of Alay Pinoy Publishing House Inc. (which publishes books, pamphlets, and other materials on patriotism and good citizenship) and a co-founder and board member of Remax TRP Inc., a support systems office for real estate agents in Ayala Alabang.

== Publications ==
Lacson is known for his bestselling book 12 Little Things Every Filipino Can Do To Help Our Country, published in 2005, and for his 2008 poem "I am Filipino", which is now memorized by students in some parts of the country. His publications also include the poem "Our Dream Philippines" (2010) and the books 12 Little Things Our Youth Can Do to Help Our Country (2011), 12 Little Things Global Filipinos Can Do to Help Our Motherland (2011), 8 Principles of Success for the Filipino Youth (2011), and 12 Wonderful Things about the Filipino & Our Motherland (2012).

=== 12 Little Things ===
When he published a 108-page book titled 12 Little Things Every Filipino Can Do to Help Our Country, it struck a nerve among many Filipinos.

The 12 "little things" are:

1. Follow traffic rules. Follow the law.
2. Whenever you buy or pay for anything, always ask for an official receipt.
3. Don't buy smuggled goods. Buy local. Buy Filipino.
4. When you talk to others, especially foreigners, speak positively about us and our country.
5. Respect your traffic officer, policeman, and soldier.
6. Do not litter. Dispose of your garbage properly. Segregate. Recycle. Conserve.
7. Support your church.
8. During elections, do your solemn duty.
9. Pay your employees well.
10. Pay your taxes.
11. Adopt a scholar or a poor child.
12. Be a good parent. Teach your kids to follow the law and love our country.

According to Lacson, it was the Philippine Star founder and columnist Maximo Soliven who opened the door for him and his book. Lacson and Soliven met for the first time on December 15, 2005, five months after the book was published. According to Soliven, his new BMW broke down in the middle of the street, and Lacson pulled over and offered to help. Inside Lacson's car, Soliven saw a few copies of his book, and four days later, on December 19, he wrote a newspaper column titled "A Filipino of Faith".

The column went viral on social media. Many people called Soliven's office to ask how to contact Lacson and where to buy his book. Lacson started receiving speaking invitations—more than 300 in 2006 alone—and sales took off.

== Awards and honors ==
The awards Lacson has received include:

- Family Values Award, The Church of Jesus Christ of Latter-day Saints in the Philippines (November 2014)
- Most Distinguished Lay Leader, Diocese of Kabankalan City, Negros Occidental (March 2013)
- Good Citizen / Good Filipino award, Edsa People Power Commission (February 2009)
- Best in Filipino linguistics award, M.I. International School (2009)
- Good Pilipino award, Galing Pilipino Movement (2006)

== Personal life ==
In 1990, Lacson and his siblings discovered a half-brother from their father and another woman, who had died giving birth to the child. In 1995, when Lacson was studying for the bar examination, he took time off to search for his half-brother in Palawan, whom he found with the help of his paternal aunts in a remote barangay. Lacson's father-in-law, Teodoro Peña, found the half-brother eom employment as a janitor and messenger at Palawan State University in Puerto Princesa. Lacson subsequently decided to help all four of his half-brother's children with their studies. The eldest finished college and got a job at a hotel in Puerto Princesa; another is employed in one of Lacson's companies.

Lacson married fellow lawyer Pia Peña in 1995, and they have four children: Theo, Angeli, Ally, and John.

In 1999, at the height of the financial crisis in Asia, Lacson and his wife considered moving to the United States or Canada. Lacson's older brother and his family had immigrated to the US the year before and in 1999, another brother and his family applied for residency in Canada. In 2000, however, Lacson and his wife decided to stay in the Philippines.
