= John Castriciones =

Filipino lawyer and government official

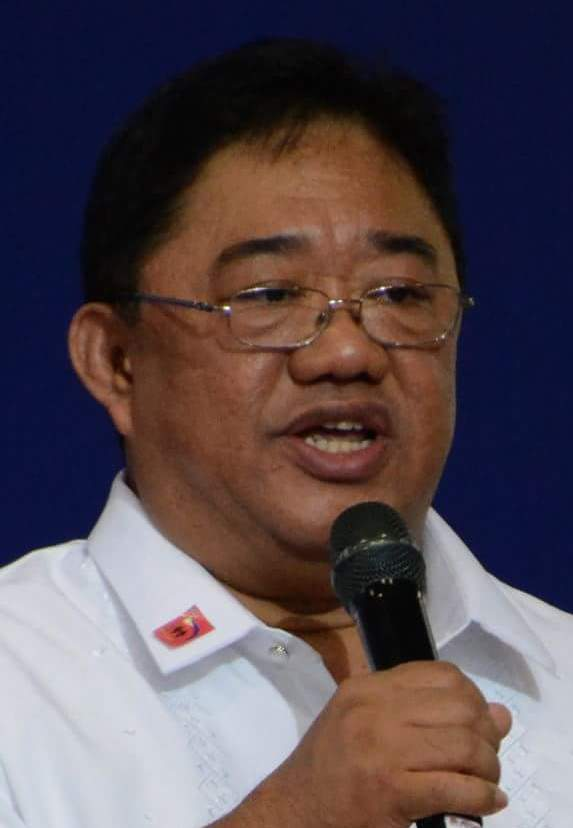
- Castriciones in 2018

14th Secretary of Agrarian Reform
- In office December 1, 2017 – October 8, 2021
- President: Rodrigo Duterte
- Preceded by: Rosalina Bistoyong (OIC)
- Succeeded by: Bernie Cruz (acting)

Undersecretary for Operations of the Department of the Interior and Local Government
- In office July 1, 2016 – November 30, 2017
- President: Rodrigo Duterte
- Preceded by: Rafael Santos
- Succeeded by: Epimaco V. Densing III

Personal details
- Born: John Rualo Castriciones; January 8, 1962 (age 64) Bayombong, Nueva Vizcaya, Philippines
- Party: PDP–Laban (2016–2018, 2021–present)
- Other political affiliations: PFP (2018–2021)
- Education: Trinity University of Asia (AB); Philippine Military Academy; San Beda University; Arellano University (LL.B); University of Notre Dame (LL.M)
- Profession: Lawyer, professor

John Rualo Castriciones (born January 8, 1962), also known by the nickname Bro. John, is a Filipino lawyer and writer who served as the Secretary of Agrarian Reform under the Duterte administration from 2017 to 2021. He was formerly Undersecretary for Operations of the Department of the Interior and Local Government from 2016 to 2017. A member of the Philippine Military Academy "Maharlika" class of 1984, Castriciones also served in various capacities under two previous administrations and as a law school professor at his alma mater Arellano University. His appointment to the Agrarian Reform portfolio was approved by the Commission on Appointments on May 29, 2018, after being bypassed earlier by the commission on March 14, 2018, and reappointed by Duterte on March 22, 2018. Castriciones founded the Partido Federal ng Pilipinas together with the Mayor Rodrigo Roa Duterte-National Executive Coordinating Committee (MRRD-NECC).

Castriciones is a native of the province of Nueva Vizcaya. He was born on January 8, 1962, to a family of farmers in the municipality of Bayombong. As a young cadet-student at the Philippine Military Academy during Martial law under Ferdinand Marcos, Castriciones was accused in the 1981 hazing death of fellow cadet Andres Ramos and was sentenced to five years of hard labor by a seven-man military court in July 1982. He was pardoned four year later by the then newly installed President Corazon Aquino.

Castriciones then enrolled at the Trinity University of Asia in Quezon City, formerly Trinity College, and graduated magna cum laude with a political science degree. He went on to attend San Beda University, former San Beda College, and Arellano University to pursue legal studies where he was consistently in the Dean's List. Castriciones passed the Philippine Bar Examination in 1990. He later earned an LLM degree in Comparative Government and International Law from Notre Dame Law School in London, U.K. in 1998.

Castriciones completed his military training at the Philippine Military Academy in 1994 as part of the Maharlika Class.

== Career ==
Castriciones started practicing law in 1993 and has since litigated in both inferior and superior courts, administrative bodies, Ombudsman and the Sandiganbayan. He served as legal counsel for several corporations and government officials in his more than 20 years of private law practice. Castriciones eventually founded his own law firm, the Castriciones Legal Consultancy, where his lawyer children also practice.

While a private lawyer, Castriciones also taught at Arellano University School of Law where he specialized in Corporation Law, Obligations and Contracts, Sales Investment Law, Public and Private International Law and Civil Procedure. He is also a former lecturer in the Mandatory Continuing Legal Education (MCLE) program of the Supreme Court of the Philippines for three years. Castriciones has also authored several books throughout his career, including Internal Revolution: Political Vengeance and Societal Perdition (2011); A Risen Catholic Christian Soldier (1998); Philippine Military Academy Hazing Case: A General’s Son Dies (1990); and Sagutin Natin (1984).

Castriciones entered the government sector in 2009 as Director of the Department of Transportation's Investigation, Security and Law Enforcement Service (ISLES) under President Gloria Macapagal Arroyo. He also served as Legal Consultant of the Land Transportation Franchising and Regulatory Board and as assistant spokesman and deputy chairman of Task Force Gabay at Tagapagligtas sa Karagatan of the Transportation department. He was reappointed to the same post in the Transportation department under President Benigno Aquino III.

During the 2016 Philippine presidential election, Castriciones served as PDP–Laban's vice-president for Luzon who also supported the candidacy of then-mayor of Davao City, Rodrigo Duterte, as president of the Mayor Rodrigo R. Duterte for President Movement (MRRDPM). He was eventually appointed by Duterte as Undersecretary of the Department of the Interior and Local Government upon his assumption to office.

In February 2018, Castriciones helped form the Partido Federal ng Pilipinas where he once served as the party's president. The political party supports the Duterte administration's campaign for a shift to federalism. Castriciones, who earlier expressed interest in running for a senatorial post in the 2019 Philippine Senate election, announced in October 2018 that he was dropping out of the senatorial race and will be keeping his post as Agrarian Reform secretary. In October 2021, he stepped down as secretary to run for senator in 2022 under PDP–Laban. He was also named as the guest candidate under the senatorial slate of Isko Moreno, as he has expressed support to his candidacy for president. Castriciones lost after placing 49th in the official results and garnering over 719 thousand votes.

== See also ==
- Department of Agrarian Reform
- Partido Federal ng Pilipinas

Political offices
Preceded by Rafael Santos	Undersecretary for Operations of the Department of the Interior and Local Government; 2016–2017	Succeeded by Epimaco Densing III
Preceded by Rosalina Bistoyong; Officer-in-charge	Secretary of Agrarian Reform; 2017–2021	Succeeded by Bernie Cruz; Acting
