= Sonny Matula =

Filipino labor leader

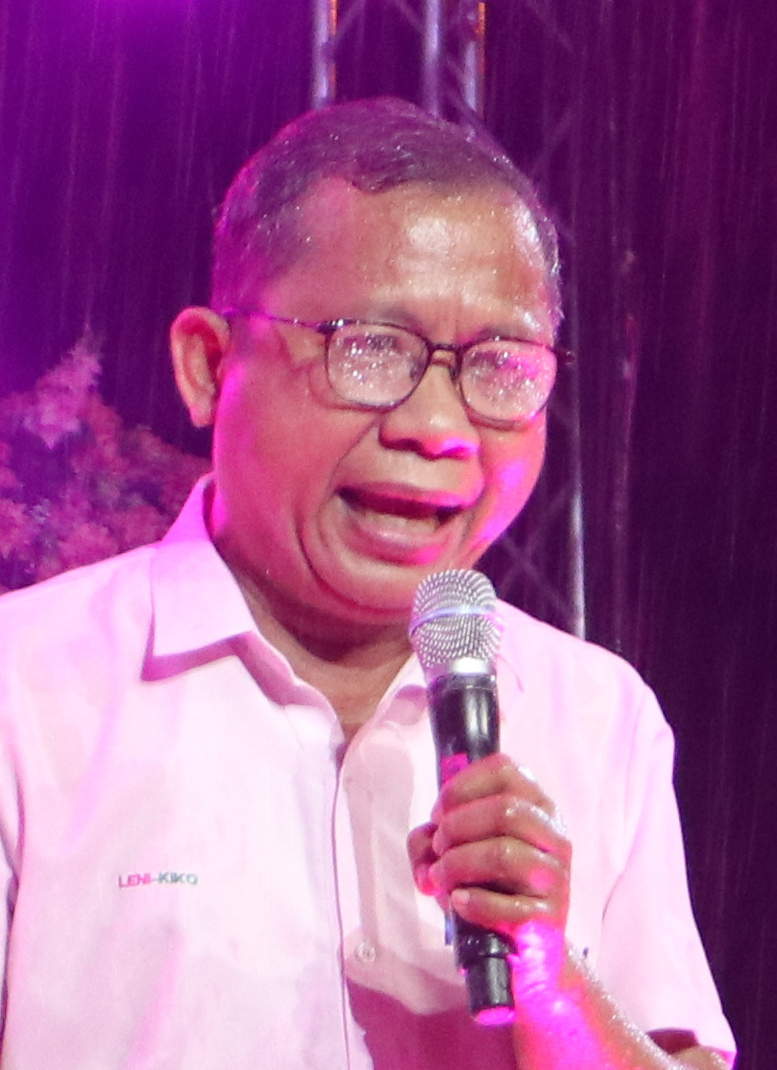
- Sonny Matula at the Robredo–Pangilinan rally in 2022

President of the Federation of Free Workers
- Incumbent
- Assumed office 2021

Personal details
- Born: Jose Sonny Gito Matula; January 21, 1965 (age 61) Sultan sa Barongis, Cotabato, Philippines
- Party: WPP
- Spouse: Melba Cubal
- Children: 2
- Education: Mindanao State University (BA); Manuel L. Quezon University (LL.B)
- Occupation: Labor leader
- Profession: Lawyer

Jose Sonny Gito Matula (born January 21, 1965) is a labor leader and current president of Federation of Free Workers. He was a senatorial candidate in 2019, 2022, and 2025.

== Early life and education ==
Matula was born on January 21, 1965, in Sultan sa Barongis, Cotabato (now part of Maguindanao del Sur) but grew up in the town of Loreto, Agusan del Sur. He was the valedictorian of Loreto Central Elementary School. He later moved to Butuan and attended Agusan National High School and simultaneously worked as a newsboy to support his studies. Matula pursued higher education at Mindanao State University, where he earned a bachelor's degree in political science.

== Career ==
Sonny Matula began his career as a legal counsel, serving in this capacity for over 20 years. In 2001, he became the executive director of the Presidential Anti-Graft Commission, a position he held until 2002. From 2006 to 2010, Matula served as a commissioner of the Social Security System (SSS). During this time, he also became a representative at the International Labor Conferences and held other significant roles in labor advocacy.

In the labor movement, Matula has been a leading figure, serving as the president of the Federation of Free Workers (FFW). He also became the Vice President of FFW from 2009 to 2021 and later chaired the Nagkaisa Labor Coalition. His advocacy focuses on labor rights, wage increases, and worker protection, and he continues to lead efforts within these organizations.

== Political runs ==
=== 2019 elections ===
On October 17, 2018, Matula filed his certificate of candidacy for the 2019 Philippine Senate election under the Labor Party of the Philippines. He was endorsed by the labor federation Nagkaisa along with Allan Montano. He was endorsed by the Trade Union Congress of the Philippines, which has 1.2 million members, along with Neri Colmenares. Matula was endorsed by the Makabayan coalition along with Leody de Guzman at a ceremony at Quezon on March 14.

He was part of the Labor Win alliance, appearing on the proclamation rally at Plaza Miranda after a motorcade. He supported decent jobs with a living wage and access to regular programs for workers. He supported the modernization of agriculture, the promotion of collective bargaining, and increase of social protection. Matula placed 50th out of 62 candidates with 400,339 votes.

=== 2022 elections ===
In the 2022 Philippine Senate election, he was chosen as the 12th candidate for the Team Robredo–Pangilinan coalition, running as an independent politician. He was also endorsed by the Makabayan Coalition in their senatorial lineup. He ran in the elections independently.

Matula advocated for stricter enforcement of the Labor Code by increasing penalties for violations. He supports raising the fine from ₱1,000 to ₱50,000, arguing that "employers violate the labor code frequently because the penalty is low." This stance follows a law previously filed by Senator Win Gatchalian, which was later vetoed by former President Rodrigo Duterte. He has emphasized that advocating for labor rights does not equate to being anti-business, highlighting the importance of collaboration between workers and employers. Matula also pushes for job creation outside Metro Manila and calls on Congress to revise the Wage Rationalization Act (Republic Act No. 6727). He advocates for higher minimum wages in rural areas of the Philippines.

He placed 36th out of 64 candidates with 2,692,565 votes. Allegations were made that Matula and the FFW supported Robredo's rival, Bongbong Marcos in the 2016 vice presidential election. Matula denied ever formally endorsing Marcos, stated that Marcos was only an attendee of an election forum, but also other candidates were extended the courtesy of an invitation for the event.

=== 2025 elections ===
In October 2024, Matula filed his certificate of candidacy for the 2025 Philippine Senate election under the Workers' and Peasants' Party ticket alongside senatorial candidate, Subair Mustapha. He officially launched his campaign in February 2025, emphasizing his commitment to labor rights and progressive policies. He campaigned in barangay halls and local fish ports.

== Personal life ==
Matula is married to Melba Cubal, an accountancy university instructor with whom he has two children. They reside in Biñan, Laguna.

== Electoral history ==
Electoral history of Sonny Matula
Year	Office	Party	Votes received				Result
Year	Office	Party	Total	%	P.	Swing	Result
2019	Senator of the Philippines	WPP	400,339	0.85%	50th	—N/a	Lost
2022	Senator of the Philippines	IND	2,692,565	4.85%	36th	+4.00	Lost
2025	Senator of the Philippines	WPP	3,865,792	6.74%	38th	+1.89	Lost
