= Bagumbayan–VNP =

Voluntarist political party in the Philippines

Bagumbayan–Volunteers for a New Philippines
- Abbreviation: Bagumbayan–VNP
- President: Leon F. Herrera
- Chairman: Dick Gordon
- Secretary-General: Rey Faizal P. Millan
- Founded: April 27, 2009
- Headquarters: Unit 3C Classica Condominium I HV Dela Costa St., Makati City, M.M.
- Ideology: Voluntaryism
- Political position: Centre-right
- National affiliation: TRoPa (2022); PGP (2016); UNA (2013)
- Colors: Red
- Senate: 0 / 24
- House of Representatives: 0 / 317
- Provincial governors: 0 / 82
- Provincial vice governors: 0 / 82
- Provincial board members: 0 / 840

Website
- Official Website

The Bagumbayan–Volunteers for a New Philippines (Bagumbayan–VNP) is a political party in the Philippines. It is the political party of former Philippine Senator Richard Gordon.

== History ==
=== Bagumbayan Movement ===
First logo of Bagumbayan-VNP, circa 2010s

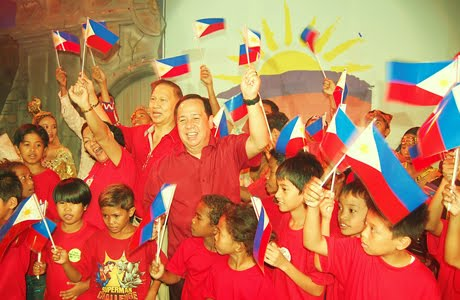
Bagumbayan-VNP's national convention on April 27, 2009

The looming withdrawal of the Americans from the U.S naval base in Subic Bay meant the loss of over 40,000 jobs for Filipinos who were employed in the said base. $8 million worth of infrastructure left behind by the Americans in the base was in danger of being looted from outsiders, as evidenced by the looting that occurred in 1991 at the Clark Air Base due to the aftermath of the Pinatubo eruption.

To address the problems beforehand, Gordon led the citizens of Olongapo to mobilize and lobby for the inclusion of a free port concept into the national legislation for the conversion of the U.S. bases. The effort was successful, with the inclusion of the establishment of the Subic Bay Freeport Zone (also known as the Subic Special Economic Zone) in Section 12 of Republic Act No. 7227, otherwise known as the Bases Conversion and Development Act, which was approved on March 13, 1992. Section 13 of the same legislation also provided for the establishment of the Subic Bay Metropolitan Authority (SBMA), which was tasked to administer the Subic Bay Freeport Zone.

On April 3, 1992, Gordon was appointed as the chairman of the SBMA by President Corazon Aquino. By November 24, 1992, the U.S. Navy completed its withdrawal from the facility and its conversion for civilian and commercial use began. Volunteerism and the high civic spirit of the host community marked the pioneering efforts at conversion - thus the "Bagumbayan Movement" started as a volunteer group whose members served in the SBMA.

=== Bagumbayan Party ===
The Bagumbayan Movement composed of more than 30,000 volunteers was officially launched on April 27, 2009 at the historic Manila Hotel on the occasion of the 488th anniversary of the Battle of Mactan, the nation's first victory against the colonial invaders. Leon F. Herrera, president of the Bagumbayan–Volunteers for a New Philippines Movement, said Bagumbayan's grand launching was timed on the anniversary of the Battle of Mactan because Lapu-Lapu, the first Filipino hero, is one of the movement's inspirations. About 2,000 delegates flocked to the movement's grand launching and national convention that raised P17 Million through individual contributions and which was graced by Senator Richard Gordon, the keynote speaker. The senator was joined by other guest speakers, to wit: world flyweight champion Nonito Donaire Jr., CNN Hero nominee Efren Peñaflorida, Journey lead vocalist Arnel Pineda, and Chikka.com founder Dennis Mendiola.

Bagumbayan–VNP was officially accredited by the Commission on Elections as a political party on November 17, 2009.

== Ideology and political positions ==
=== Peace and security ===
Bagumbayan–VNP's position on peace and security is to uphold the authority of the Philippine Government in all provinces and regions of the country by establishing peace and order, bringing an end to the communist insurgency and Muslim secessionist rebellion, dismantling all private armies, and keeping the peace in all communities through effective local law enforcement. To achieve this, Bagumbayan–VNP proposes to establish peace and security throughout the archipelago by implementing the following measures:

- Enforce the authority of the State in every community, every province and every region in the country.
- Bring an end to the Communist insurgency and the Muslim secessionist rebellion through the process of peaceful negotiation if possible, or by force of arms if necessary.
- Disarm and disband all private armies in the country.
- Improve law enforcement through the reorganization of the Philippine National Police and the greater participation of local government units and local communities in keeping the peace within their jurisdiction.
- Wage a vigorous campaign against organized crime, the drug trade and illegal gambling.

=== Graft and Corruption ===
Bagumbayan–VNP's stand to curb graft and corruption in all levels of the government bureaucracy by making the President lead by example, installing full transparency and accountability in government operations, strengthening the independence of the Ombudsman, and overhauling government agencies long noted for graft. Bagumbayan–VNP proposes high priority to rooting out graft and corruption because it is a major obstacle to national progress and modernization. The spread of graft from revenue agencies to virtually all government agencies is pervasive. Local governments have likewise gotten into the action in a big way. Bagumbayan–VNP proposes the following measures:

- Make the position of Ombudsman a nationally elected position.
- Declog the Sandiganbayan in the prosecution of corruption cases.
- Eliminate presidential pardon for government officials found guilty of graft.
- Establish full transparency in executive projects, and include cabinet officials under judicial and congressional oversight.
- Punish all those who offer bribes and corrupt members of the bureaucracy.

=== Government modernization ===
Bagumbayan–VNP's platform to transform the bureaucracy and the public services into a productive, efficient and forward-looking organization by adopting best practices in government operations, improving government finances through the collection of proper taxes, providing clear roles, guidelines and procedures for each government department and employee, and establishing meritocracy as the basis for advancement in the public service. Recognizing that the role of government has become more central and vital than ever in the new global economy, and considering how weak and ineffective the Philippine government has been for many decades, Bagumbayan–VNP proposes top priority to the transformation of the government bureaucracy into an engine for national modernization and development. Bagumbayan–VNP's key to achieving this are the following measures:

- Undertake from day one a full performance audit of the entire government bureaucracy in order to determine what agencies must be retained, strengthened, or eliminated because of obsolescence.
- Create clear roles and goals for each department to perform and meet in the modernization effort.
- Establish meritocracy as the rule for advancement in the civil service.
- Raise the standards for entry in the civil service.
- Adopt best practices in government management and operations.
- Eliminate wasteful spending in every agency of government.

=== Economy ===
Bagumbayan–VNP's position in improving the Philippine economy to a new level of growth and global competitiveness by investing in the modernization of national infrastructure, releasing the energies of the private sector, simplifying and streamlining the rules and procedures for doing business, raising domestic and foreign investments in the economy, and raising productivity in agriculture, industry and services. Government’s role in the economy is central and vital to national success. The economy cannot be delegated merely to the private sector. Government must lead the way. To meet this objective the following programs will be implemented:

- Energy Sufficiency and Efficiency — The current power crisis and the continued volatility of oil prices highlight the need for a long-term and focused energy program to achieve both energy sufficiency and efficiency. Bagumbayan–VNP promotes a comprehensive energy program that should include 1) overhauling and strengthening the Department of Energy, 2) setting clear targets for expansion of power generation capacity, 3) setting targets for the replacement of oil imports with alternative clean energy sources, and 4) setting standards for energy conservation and efficient energy utilization.
- Food Security and Agricultural Development— Food security and sufficiency is the primordial challenge facing the country every year as a result of typhoons and droughts. Bagumbayan–VNP believe Government must commit assign top priority to agricultural modernization.
- Tourism Development and Jobs Creation—Tourism is an export industry and it's a tremendous jobs creator. With the passage of the Tourism Development Act, attention must now focus on making it come to life through the right implementing rules and regulations, and effective reorganization of the Tourism machinery, and effective management. Bagumbayan–VNP sets as a minimum the target 5 million tourist arrivals and one million new tourism jobs by 2013.
- Infrastructure Modernization and Jobs Creation—Infrastructure modernization is a must for national development and for Philippine competitiveness in the global economy. This is a challenge that the nation cannot shirk because of lack of resources or whatever. The public investment must be made in the modernization of the nation’s highways, transport systems, ports, airports, and communications. What government cannot provide in terms of capital, the private sector will be encouraged to supply. And whatever domestic investments cannot raise, foreign investments must fill the gap. Bagumbayan–VNP sets the achievement of $20 billion direct foreign investments in three years.

=== Human resources ===
Bagumbayan–VNP's stand on the improvement of the Human Resources is to provide for quality basic education to every Filipino child, modernize our education system from elementary to tertiary level, relieve once and for all the classroom shortage, modernize our public health system and provide health insurance for every citizen.

=== Education ===
Bagumbayan–VNP's position to improve the education are the following:

- Undertake a comprehensive review of educational priorities and reorganize the Department of Education
- Add two years to basic education
- Meet the classroom shortage and reduce the average number of students to 50 per class within three years
- Increase the salaries of teachers to a minimum of P40,000 per month to attract top graduates to teaching.
- Provide sturdy, electronic book reader to public school students to lower costs for books and give them IT know-how.

=== Health care ===
Bagumbayan–VNP's position to improve the health care are the following:

- Extend free public health services to cover all citizens, especially in the rural areas.
- Increase the salaries of doctors and nurses in order to keep more of them in the country.
- Establish compulsory healthcare savings account for all Filipinos.
- Establish more Botika ng Barangay outlets nationwide.
- Promote responsible parenthood.

== Party officials ==
Chairperson: Senator Richard Gordon
President: Leon B. Herrera
Secretary General: Rey Faizal P. Millan
Treasurer: Rodolfo Reyes

== Candidates for the Philippine general election ==
=== 2010 ===
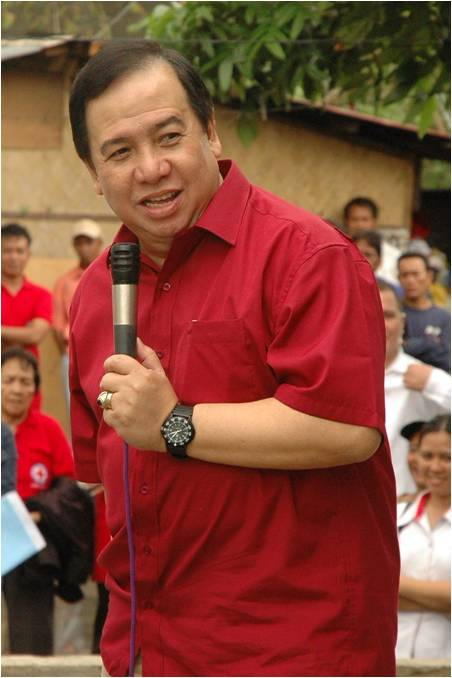
Senator Richard Gordon, one of the founders of Bagumbayan-VNP Party. He is also the party's presidential nominee for the 2010 Philippine Presidential Election.

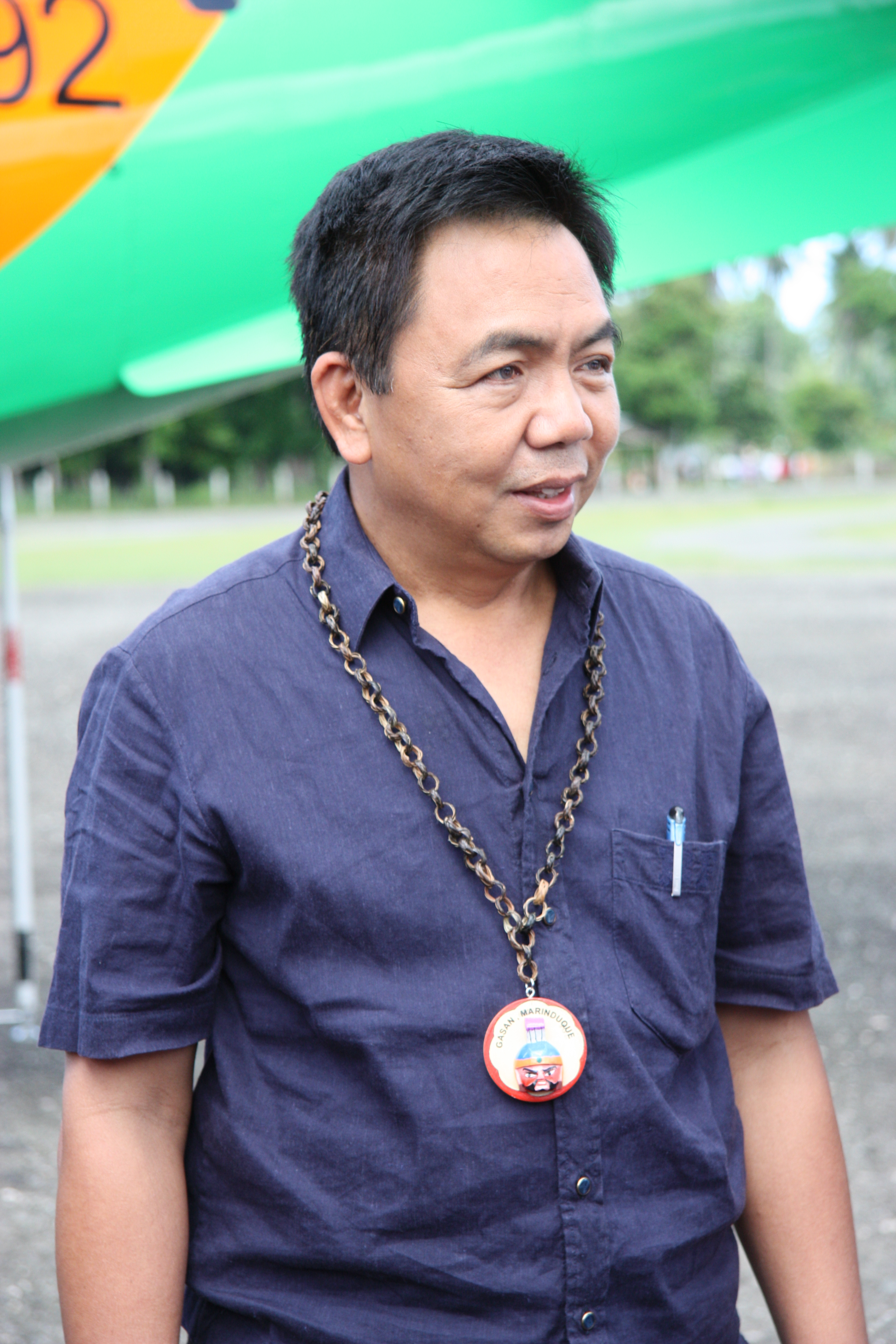
Former Marikina Mayor and Metropolitan Manila Development Authority (MMDA) Chairman Bayani Fernando. He is also the party's Vice-Presidential nominee for the 2010 Philippine General Election.

==== National candidates ====
- Richard Gordon for President of the Philippines (lost)
- Bayani Fernando for Vice President of the Philippines (lost)

==== Congressional candidates ====
===== Basilan =====
- Ibno Tubarin for Representative of Basilan

===== Marikina =====
- Donn Carlo Favis for Representative of Marikina's 2nd district

===== Quezon City =====
- Catherine Violago for Representative of Quezon City's 3rd district

===== Zambales =====
- Anne Marie Gordon for Representative of Zambales' 1st district

==== Local candidates ====
===== Iligan City =====
- Mayor
  - Ismael "Joel" Naga
- Councilors
  - Fred Echavez
  - Ronie Espina
  - Joe Booc
  - Jun Silva
  - Boy Ortaleza
  - Alan Amantiad

===== Hilongos Leyte =====
- Mayor
  - Jose Roble
- Vice-Mayor
  - Crispin Fulache
- Councilors
  - Montano Go
  - Garry Villaquer

===== Marikina =====
- Mayor
  - Marion Andres
- Vice-Mayor
  - Boy Bolok Santos
- Councilors
  - Frankie Ayuson
  - Bojie Bernardino
  - Carissa Carlos
  - Mel David
  - Siso Dela Cruz
  - Roy Delgado
  - Dondie Reyes
  - Ponchie Santos
  - Jaime Cruz Jr.
  - Annie Dayao
  - Federico Ifurung
  - Manuel Orara
  - Jojo Ortiz
  - Roberto Ponce
  - Wilfred Reyes
  - Bong Ubaldo

===== Olongapo City =====
- Mayor
  - James Gordon Jr.
- Vice-Mayor
  - Cynthia Cajudo
- Councilors
  - Rodel Cerezo
  - Aquilino Cortes Jr.
  - Elena Dabu
  - James De los Reyes
  - Edna Elane
  - Romeo Guerrero
  - Eyrma Marzan-Estrella
  - Gina Perez
  - Eduardo Piano

=== 2013 ===
==== Senatorial Slate (1) ====
- Richard "Dick" Gordon – Guest Candidate from United Nationalist Alliance (lost)

=== 2016 ===
==== Senatorial Slate (1) ====
- Richard "Dick" Gordon – Guest Candidate from Partido Galing at Puso (won)

=== 2022 ===
==== Senatorial Slate (1) ====
- Richard "Dick" Gordon – Guest Candidate from TRoPa (lost)

== Electoral performance ==
=== Presidential and vice presidential elections ===
Year	Presidential election			Vice presidential election		
Year	Candidate	Vote share	Result	Candidate	Vote share	Result
2010	Dick Gordon	1.39%	Benigno Aquino III (Liberal)	Bayani Fernando	2.89%	Jejomar Binay (PDP–Laban)
2016	None (Note: Bagumbayan supported Grace Poe (PGP) for president.)		Rodrigo Duterte (PDP–Laban)	None (Note: Bagumbayan supported Chiz Escudero (PGP) for vice president.)		Leni Robredo (Liberal)
2022	None (Note: Bagumbayan supported Leni Robredo (Tropa) for president.)		Bongbong Marcos (PFP)	None (Note: Bagumbayan supported Kiko Pangilinan (Tropa) for vice president.)		Sara Duterte (Lakas)

=== Legislative elections ===
Congress of the Philippines
House of Representatives			Senate			
Year	Seats won	Result	Year	Seats won	Ticket	Result
2010	0 / 286	Lakas plurality	2010	Did not participate		Liberal win 4/12 seats
2013	Did not participate	Liberal plurality	2013	Did not participate		Team PNoy win 9/12 seats
2016	Did not participate	Liberal plurality	2016	Did not participate		Daang Matuwid win 7/12 seats
2019	0 / 304	PDP–Laban plurality	2019	0 / 12	Single party ticket	Hugpong win 9/12 seats
2022	0 / 316	PDP–Laban plurality	2022	0 / 12	Single party ticket	UniTeam win 6/12 seats
