= Repose =

Repose may refer to:

- Lying in repose, when the body of a deceased person is set out for public viewing
- Dying, particularly used of saints in the Eastern Orthodox Church
- Mount Repose (disambiguation), several mountains
- USS Repose, several US Navy ships
- The Repose, an 1860 painting by Jean-Baptiste-Camille Corot
- Repose (painting), a c.1871 painting by Édouard Manet
