= José Tagle =

Filipino colonel in the Philippine Revolution (1885–1910)

José Tagle y Santarin
- Born: March 18, 1855; Bayan Luma, Imus, Cavite, Captaincy General of the Philippines
- Died: September 12, 1910 (aged 55); Manila, Philippine Islands
- Known for: Battle of Imus; Grandfather of James L. Gordon; Great-grandfather of Richard Gordon; Great-granduncle of Luis Antonio Tagle
- Spouse: Isabel Bella
- Children: 2

José Tagle y Santarin (March 18, 1855 – September 12, 1910) was a Filipino military officer who participated in the Battle of Imus during the Philippine Revolution.

== Early life ==
Prior to the Philippine Revolution, the Tagles were part of the Principalía, the country's lowland, Hispanic colonized aristocracy. Tagle was born in Barangay Bayan Luma, Imus, Cavite, in 1855, one of seven children of Benito Tagle and Simona Santarin, both of Imus. He received his early education at the local school. He was the municipal captain while leading the Imus rebels as the head of the Katipunan chapter in Imus.

== Philippine Revolution ==
The flag of the K.K.K.

José Tagle played a significant role in the opening battle of the Philippine Revolution in Cavite.

According to General Emilio Aguinaldo's account of the battle, Tagle, then head of Barangay Pilar of Imus, first came to his headquarters at Cavite El Viejo on September 1, 1896, to ask for his help in raiding Imus. Together, they proceeded to the town accompanied with a brass band. The friars headed by Friar Eduarte and the Guardia Civil saw them approaching and fled towards the Imus Hacienda, where they were subsequently subdued.

The second time Aguinaldo met Tagle was on September 3, 1896, when the latter went to his headquarters to ask again for reinforcements against the impending attack by strong Spanish forces from Manila then massing off Bacoor. The resulting battle ended in the defeat of the Spaniards by the Spanish General Ernesto de Aguirre, and the capture of his sword or sable del mando crafted in Toledo, Spain. Aguinaldo used the sword as his command throughout the Revolution.

In recognition of his contribution to the victory in Imus, Aguinaldo appointed Tagle as Municipal Captain of the town with the authority to choose his companions in establishing the government and organizing a revolutionary army in Imus.

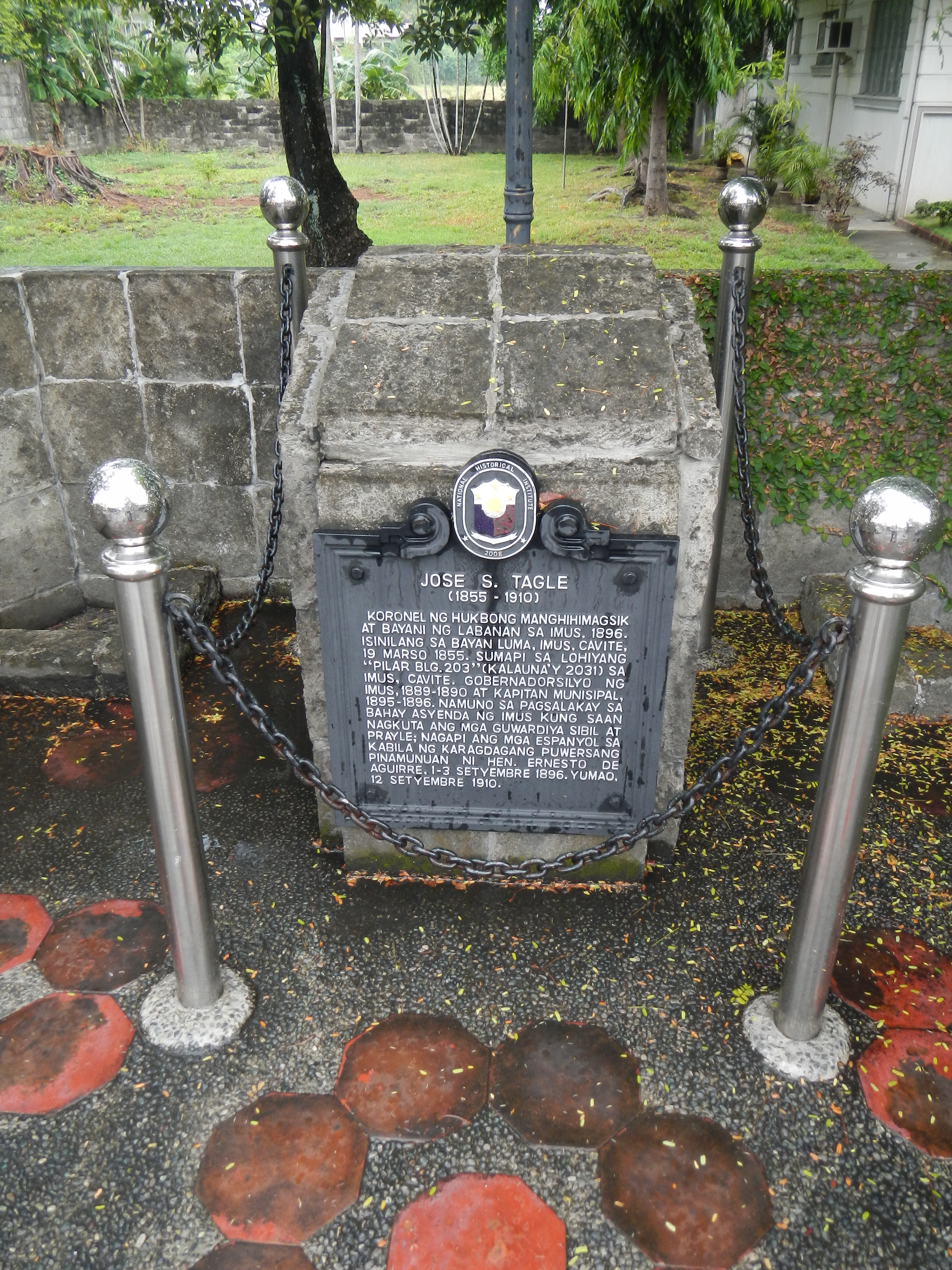
House and marker at Imus, Cavite

He died and was buried in 1910, leaving behind no pictures, letters or war mementos.

== Family ==
He was married to Isabel Bella and they had three children: Agustina Tagle-Ramirez, Veronica Tagle-Gordon and José Tagle Jr. Veronica Tagle married John Jacob Gordon, an American who was stationed at Subic Naval Base. They had a child named James L. Gordon, the former mayor of Olongapo City.

Among the descendants of Tagle's siblings are former Manila archbishop Cardinal Luis Antonio Tagle (great-grandson of his brother Macario) and Purita Tagle Abad-Lopa (granddaughter of his brother Guillermo), wife of tycoon and industrialist Manuel Lopa Sr. Lopa's children married into the Aranetas, Cojuangcos and Montinolas families. He is the great-grandfather of former Senator Richard J. Gordon.

== In popular culture ==
Tagle was portrayed by Gary Estrada in the 2012 film, El Presidente.
