= James L. Gordon =

Filipino-American politician and mayor of Olongapo (1917–1967)

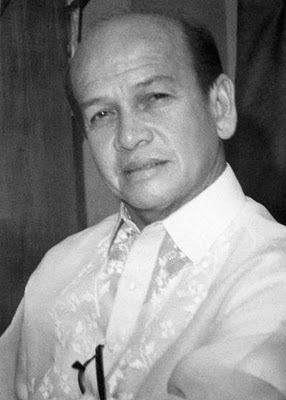

Mayor of Olongapo City
- In office December 30, 1963 – February 20, 1967
- Vice Mayor: Jaime Guevarra
- Preceded by: Ildefonso O. Arriola
- Succeeded by: Jaime Guevarra

Personal details
- Born: James Leonard Tagle Gordon; January 17, 1917 Imus, Cavite, Philippine Islands
- Died: February 20, 1967 (aged 50) Olongapo, Philippines
- Cause of death: Assassination (gunshot wounds)
- Party: Nacionalista (1963–1967)
- Spouse: Amelia Juico
- Children: 6 (including Dick Gordon)
- Occupation: Politician

James Leonard Tagle Gordon Sr. (January 17, 1917 – February 20, 1967) was a Filipino-American politician who was mayor of Olongapo from December 30, 1963, until his assassination on February 20, 1967. As mayor, he presided over the transition of Olongapo from a municipality to a city.

Unlike his four brothers who took American citizenship and lived in the United States, he chose to stay in the Philippines as a Filipino citizen and raised his children as Filipino citizens. Gordon was the father of former Olongapo Mayor Richard Gordon, and adopted numerous children with his wife Amelia.

== Early life ==
Gordon was born on January 17, 1917, to an American Marine father, John Jacob Gordon, and a Filipina mother, Veronica Tagle y Bella.

== Career ==
=== Civic consciousness ===
In the field of civic work James Gordon led in the forming of groups that worked on community projects. He was one of the organizers of the Olongapo Civic Action Group that worked on beautification projects and the general improvement of the city. He was one of the founders of the Olongapo Rotary Club, which has given rise to four other Rotary clubs at present. He was also one of the founders of the Olongapo Knights of Columbus- and was selected the second Grand Knight. He organized the Olongapo Businessmen's Association which then, as now, played a significant part in community life.

=== Military rule ===
During Gordon's time, Olongapo was in a curious situation. The rest of the Philippines had been declared independent of the United States on July 4, 1946. Olongapo, however, remained under U.S. Government jurisdiction. It had been declared a U.S. Naval Reservation soon after the U.S. and Spain signed the Treaty of Paris. As such it was administered by a U.S. Navy officer. In other words, instead of having a Filipino Mayor, Olongapo had as its governing authority an American military official. Residents had to follow strict rules like: always having an ID Card issued by the Reservation office; home lots could not be owned, these could be taken back any time the US Navy needed the area; relatives from out of town can stay only for a few days and had to renew their passes if their stay was extended; only families with working members could stay in the Reservation. These strictly followed rules made the residents angry. But they became angrier when bus passengers going in and out of the Naval Reservation were made to get off the bus for strict searches of their belongings.

=== Turnover of Olongapo to Philippine government ===
Jimmy Gordon led the move to make Olongapo free from U.S. rule. He was well respected by US Navy officials and had many friends among the Americans but could not stomach the military regulations that limited the movements of people in Olongapo. Jose Balein of the Manila Chronicle interviewed him and in a series of articles from July 3 to 7, 1955, he exposed the abuses and harassment suffered by Olongapo residents under US military rule.

The Zambales provincial officials supported Gordon in this fight to be free of military restrictions. As Vice Governor of Zambales, he was in a position to speak for the people living in Zambales town north of Olongapo who worked in US Navy installations. Buses carrying passengers from the Zambales towns passed through Olongapo and underwent the annoying searches. The concerted resistance to military rule could not be ignored by the U.S. Navy authorities. Talks were initiated to formalize the turnover of Olongapo to the Philippine Government. The American panel was made up of officials from the US Embassy headed by Minister Abbot and officers from the U.S. Navy. The Philippine panel was headed by Pacifico Castro of the Department of Foreign Affairs. Vice Governor Gordon was a member. The US Government was thus compelled to relinquish Olongapo to the Philippine Government after the RP-US panel met several times to discuss the conditions. Olongapo was turned over to the Philippine Government on December 7, 1959. On the same day President Carlos P. Garcia signed the Executive Order making Olongapo a municipality of Zambales.

=== Political career ===
After the turnover, the provincial politicians moved in. They succeeded in placing their own men in sensitive positions in the new municipality because they worked to have officials appointed instead of elected. Gordon resigned from the post of Deputy Governor. Olongapo was marginalized under the new administration. The government hospital was reduced in category; its equipment was carted off to Zambales. Illegal logging and cigarette smuggling were rampant. Land problems proliferated. The new officials tried to lease out the electrical utility for only P5,000.00 a month. Heavy equipment like bulldozers which had been acquired from the US Navy could not be accounted for.

Prodded to run for Municipal Mayor during its first election four years after the turnover, James Gordon, though a reluctant candidate, won and was finally at the helm of his town on December 30, 1963.

=== The birth of a city ===
The situation deteriorated to the extent that Gordon, together with Olongapo residents, struggled hard to be free of the provincial government. He lobbied in Congress for the passage of a bill to convert the municipality into a City. Despite opposition from the provincial government, RA 4645, the Charter of the City of Olongapo, was signed by President Ferdinand Marcos on June 1, 1966. In simple but impressive ceremonies Olongapo City was inaugurated on September 1 and Gordon took his oath as Mayor before Vice President Lopez on September 3 of the same year.

=== Assassination attempts ===
There were three attempts on his life: On July 4, 1965, he was lured out of his house due to a false report on a fire. On the way back home, a grenade was thrown at his car. Nevertheless, he survived this first attempt. On August 4 of the same year, several prisoners were allowed to escape from the municipal jail of Subic, Zambales. Once again, a fire was made as a ruse to make Gordon appear. Three grenades were thrown at the crowd, wounding one US Navy officer who was with the team that helped to control the blaze. James Gordon also survived this attempt. The third try was again linked to a fire. The Gordon residence in Quezon City mysteriously burned down on November 1. The family later learned that an ambush had been prepared at the Zig-Zag pass although he went through this third attempt unscathed.

== Assassination ==
On February 20, 1967, while talking with a constituent on the first floor of city hall, he was gunned down by Nonito Alincastre, an escaped inmate of the National Penitentiary. He was immediately brought to the USS Repose, a US Navy hospital ship, but he could not be saved because of his massive head injuries.

His funeral was the largest Olongapo ever saw. Senators, congressmen, and ambassadors joined the grieving Olongapo public in the funeral cortege. He was succeeded as mayor by his vice mayor Jaime Guevarra, while Gordon's wife Amelia ran for mayor in the 1967 election and won.

== Ancestry ==
Ancestors of James L. Gordon

2. John Jacob Gordon
1. James Leonard Gordon
12. Benito Tagle
6. José Tagle
13. Simona Santarin
3. Verónica Tagle
7. Isabel Bella
