= Amelia Gordon =

Filipina politician

Member of the Regular Batasang Pambansa
- In office June 30, 1984 – March 25, 1986
- Constituency: Olongapo

Mayor of Olongapo
- In office December 30, 1968 – June 30, 1972
- Preceded by: Jaime Guevarra
- Succeeded by: Geronimo Lipumano

Personal details
- Born: Amelia Nepomuceno Juico; September 4, 1919 Castillejos, Zambales, Philippine Islands
- Died: November 17, 2009 (aged 90) Olongapo, Zambales, Philippines
- Party: KBL (1984–1986); Independent (1968–1972)
- Spouse: James Leonard T. Gordon Sr. (died 1967)
- Children: Veronica "Onnie" Gordon-Lorenzana; Barbara "Bai" Gordon-Delos Reyes; Cecille Gordon-Mullen; Richard "Dick" Gordon; James "Bong" Gordon Jr. Imelda Gordon-Deza
- Occupation: Politician, humanitarian

Amelia Juico Gordon (born Amelia Nepomuceno Juico; September 4, 1919 – November 19, 2009) was a mayor of Olongapo City and mother of Senator and Red Cross Chairman Richard "Dick" Gordon.

== Early life ==
Amelia Juico Gordon was born on September 4, 1919, to Juan Juico and María Nepomuceno y Espíritu. Due to financial difficulties, she was never able to finish high school.

== Personal life ==
She married James Leonard T. Gordon, Sr., son of an American immigrant John Jacob Gordon, James Gordon became the First Municipal Mayor of Olongapo, Zambales. Amelia Juico-Gordon managed several businesses, and supported her husband with his career. She had five children, and supported abandoned children of the city. She began taking in abandoned Filipino-American children, adopting and raising them as her own, and even giving them her "Juico" last name.

As her husband was walking to the City Hall with people crowding around him, he was shot in the head by an operative of the opposition. She was left to raise her five children and also her adopted children, on her own.

== Political life ==
After her husband's death, Olongapo residents petitioned Gordon to stand for election. Gordon was the first elected city mayor and first woman elected city Mayor of Olongapo in 1967.

After her term in office, she continued her life of service in the private sector, advocating the protection and promotion of the welfare of needy and abandoned children, legally adopting fifty-four children as her own, changing the lives of thousands as the founder of the Olongapo Boys Town and Girls Home.

She founded several other civic organizations such as the Olongapo City Civic Action Group (OCAG), the Iba-Olongapo Catholic Women's League (IOCWL), and the Olongapo City Red Cross (OCRC) where she also served as Chairperson for twenty-eight years. She led and founded many civic groups in Olongapo including the Olongapo City Boy's and Girls Home, Red Cross Olongapo City Chapter (RCOCC) and the Catholic Women's League of Zambales (CWLZ).

== Awards ==
She was Former assemblywoman of the 1984 Batasang Pambansa and recipient of The Pearl S. Buck International Woman of The Year Award in 2002, only the second Filipina to receive such, for her accomplishments in her civic and humanitarian endeavor.

== Death ==
She died on November 17, 2009, at the age of ninety due to stroke.

== Descendants ==
Several of Gordon's relatives were also prominent figures in politics.

- James Leonard T. Gordon Sr., former mayor of Olongapo City.
- Barbara "Bai" Gordon-Delos Reyes, daughter of former mayor and restaurant owner (Barbara's).
- Richard "Dick" Gordon, son of former mayor, current Senator (2004-2010, 2016–present), former mayor of Olongapo City (1980-1998), former Delegate to the 1971 Constitutional Convention (1971-1972), former Chairman and Administrator of the Subic Bay Metropolitan Authority (1992-1998), former Secretary of Department of Tourism (2001-2004), and Philippine Red Cross chairman.
- Katherine "Kate" Gordon, daughter-in-law of former mayor, former mayor of Olongapo City (1995-2004) and former Congressman of 1st District of Zambales (1988-1995).
- James "Bong" Gordon Jr., son of former mayor, former Congressman of 1st District of Zambales (1995-2004) and former mayor of Olongapo City (2004-2013).
- Anne Marie C. Gordon, daughter-in-law of former mayor and former Vice Governor of Zambales (2007-2010).
- John Carlos de los Reyes, grandson of former mayor and former councilor of Olongapo City.
