= Dick Gordon (politician) =

Filipino politician (born 1945)

Senator of the Philippines
- In office June 30, 2016 – June 30, 2022
- In office June 30, 2004 – June 30, 2010
Senate committee chairmanships
Chair of the Senate Justice and Human Rights Committee
In office September 20, 2016 – June 30, 2022
Preceded by	Leila de Lima
Succeeded by	Francis Tolentino
Chair of the Senate Blue Ribbon Committee
In office July 25, 2016 – June 30, 2022
Preceded by	Teofisto Guingona III
Succeeded by	Francis Tolentino
In office February 2, 2009 – June 30, 2010
Preceded by	Alan Peter Cayetano
Succeeded by	Teofisto Guingona III
Chair of the Senate Government Corporations and Public Enterprises Committee
In office July 25, 2016 – June 30, 2022
Preceded by	Cynthia Villar
Succeeded by	Alan Peter Cayetano

Chairman of the Philippine Red Cross
- Incumbent
- Assumed office January 15, 2004

Secretary of Tourism
- In office January 20, 2001 – January 4, 2004
- President: Gloria Macapagal Arroyo
- Preceded by: Gemma Cruz Araneta
- Succeeded by: Robert Dean Barbers (acting)

Chairman and Administrator of the Subic Bay Metropolitan Authority
- In office March 13, 1992 – June 30, 1998
- President: Corazon Aquino (1992); Fidel V. Ramos (1992-1998)
- Succeeded by: Felicito Payumo

Mayor of Olongapo
- In office February 2, 1988 – July 23, 1993
- Preceded by: Teodoro Macapagal (OIC)
- Succeeded by: Cynthia Cajudo (acting)
- In office March 3, 1980 – April 23, 1986
- Preceded by: Geronimo Lipumano
- Succeeded by: Teodoro Macapagal

Delegate to the 1971 Constitutional Convention
- In office June 1, 1971 – November 29, 1972

Personal details
- Born: Richard Juico Gordon; August 5, 1945 (age 81) Castillejos, Zambales, Commonwealth of the Philippines
- Party: Bagumbayan (2009–present)
- Other political affiliations: UNA (2012–2013); Lakas (2004–2009); Nacionalista (1988–2004); KBL (1980–1988)
- Spouse: Katherine H. Gordon
- Children: 4
- Education: Ateneo de Manila University (BA); University of the Philippines Diliman (LL.B.)
- Occupation: Civil servant; Lawyer; Politician; Humanitarian; Leader
- Website: Official website

Richard "Dick" Juico Gordon (born August 5, 1945) is a Filipino lawyer and politician who most recently served as a Senator from 2016 to 2022, and previously from 2004 to 2010. He has been the chairman and CEO of the Philippine Red Cross since 2004.

He rose to national prominence for his work in preserving and developing the former U.S. naval base in Subic when he served as the first chairman of the Subic Bay Metropolitan Authority from 1992 to 1998, and when he conceptualized the Wow Philippines campaign as Secretary of Tourism from years 2001 to 2004.

Gordon was the mayor of Olongapo from 1980 to 1986 and from 1988 to 1993, and was also the youngest delegate to the 1971 Constitutional Convention.

== Early life and education ==
Gordon was born in Castillejos, Zambales. His father, James L. Gordon, was Olongapo's first elected mayor who served from 1963 until he was assassinated in 1967. His mother, Amelia Gordon, succeeded James as Olongapo mayor until 1972 and served as assemblywoman in the Batasang Pambansa in 1984. Gordon has American ancestry through his paternal grandfather John Jacob Gordon, a United States Army officer.

In 1958, Gordon completed his elementary education at Lourdes Catholic School (now Lourdes School of Quezon City) in Quezon City and Colegio de San Juan de Letran in Manila. He then finished his secondary education in 1962 at the Ateneo de Manila University. He stayed in Ateneo for his tertiary education, where he earned a Bachelor of Arts, Major in History and Government degree in 1966.

Gordon acquired his Bachelor of Laws degree at the University of the Philippines College of Law in 1975. While studying law, Gordon joined the Upsilon Sigma Phi fraternity and was elected councilor of the UP Diliman University Student Council.

== Political career ==
=== 1971 Constitutional Convention ===
While still a sophomore law student, Gordon was elected as the delegate of the first district of Zambales to the 1971 Constitutional Convention for the drafting of the 1973 Constitution of the Philippines. At 24 years old, he was the youngest delegate in the convention.

=== Mayor of Olongapo (1980–1993) ===
In 1980, he was elected mayor of Olongapo. During his term as mayor, Olongapo became a highly urbanized city in 1983. Gordon prioritized raising police accountability through I.D. systems, proper health and sanitation, waste management, and the strict implementation of a color-coding scheme for public transportation vehicles.

After the 1986 People Power Revolution, the provisional government of President Corazon Aquino issued an order for Gordon to vacate his position as Olongapo mayor, which Gordon refused in the absence of a written dismissal order. A former member of Kilusang Bagong Lipunan, Gordon was one of several local officials removed in a housecleaning effort by the Aquino government to replace potential loyalists of Ferdinand Marcos. The political crisis resulted in protests and clashes between Gordon's supporters and the supporters of Aquino's appointee Teodoro Macapagal. Gordon eventually made way for Macapagal after a formal written directive was issued by then-executive secretary Joker Arroyo. Gordon would be re-elected back to the position in 1988.

As mayor of Olongapo, Gordon described himself as a "pragmatist." Gordon defended the American military presence in Subic Bay by arguing that the Philippines is neither militarily nor economically prepared to lose the naval bases, citing the $500 million income generated per year from spending by U.S. servicemen and from the salaries of thousands of Filipino employees and contractors in the bases. Despite shutting down the "seedier" aspects of Olongapo's nightlife, Gordon defended the presence of bars and brothels in Olongapo, and also spoke positively of the income earned by the 6,000 licensed "bar girls" in the city. In 1988, Gordon led the city's efforts of stemming an HIV/AIDS outbreak in prostitutes that catered to US servicemen by conducting monthly meetings with HIV-positive prostitutes, offering them alternative livelihoods, and ensuring that they cooperated with city health officials.

=== Chairman of the Subic Bay Metropolitan Authority (1992–1998) ===
In the 1992 election, Gordon won his re-election bid as Olongapo mayor. In the same year, he was also appointed the chairmanship of the newly-established Subic Bay Metropolitan Authority (SBMA) by President Fidel V. Ramos. However, the 1987 Constitution prohibits elected officials from holding appointive positions in a public office during their tenure. Thus, the Supreme Court ruled that Gordon must choose which position to keep. Gordon decided to vacate his position as mayor and assumed the position of SBMA chairman in full capacity.

In 1992, Gordon was credited for organizing thousands of volunteers to clean volcanic ash, and maintain security in the former base, preventing the looting that had occurred in Clark Air Base earlier in the year.

During Gordon's term, Subic experienced significant economic growth with 200 companies investing $1.6 billion in Subic and manufacturing exports reaching $263 million in 1996. Gordon was also influential in convincing FedEx to establish their Asian regional hub in Subic in 1995.

In 1998, Gordon resigned as chairman of the SBMA in order to run for president in the upcoming election. However, he eventually backed out from pursuing his candidacy. Gordon was later re-appointed by the outgoing president Ramos as chairman for a new six-year term.

After winning the 1998 presidential elections, newly elected President Joseph Estrada's immediately issued his first administrative order removing Gordon as chairman of the SBMA on June 30, 1998. Gordon and Estrada had previously formed a bitter rivalry in 1989 when Gordon prohibited Estrada from filming an anti-bases movie inside Subic and Olongapo, with Estada claiming his film crew were pelted with stones by Gordon's supporters. Despite Estrada's orders, Gordon refused to vacate his office while his supporters erected barricades in the SBMA premises. On July 26, 1998, police broke through the barricades and clashed with Gordon's supporters, resulting in at least 95 injuries. According to The Wall Street Journal, the incident damaged Subic's reputation as an investment destination and cost the local economy an estimated $3.5 million of lost income per day of the 'siege'.

Gordon was succeeded by former Bataan congressman Felicito Payumo as SBMA chairman.

=== Secretary of Tourism (2001–2004) ===
In January 2001, Gordon actively participated in the second EDSA Revolution that led to the removal of Joseph Estrada from the presidency. Estrada's successor Gloria Macapagal Arroyo appointed Gordon as secretary of the Department of Tourism on January 24, 2001.

Gordon's flagship marketing campaign "Wow Philippines" earned recognition from the ITB Berlin tourism trade fair in 2001 and 2002. Gordon was elected Commissioner for East Asia and the Pacific at the World Tourism Organization in 2002 and chairman of the Pacific Asia Travel Association in 2003.

=== Senator (2004–2010) ===
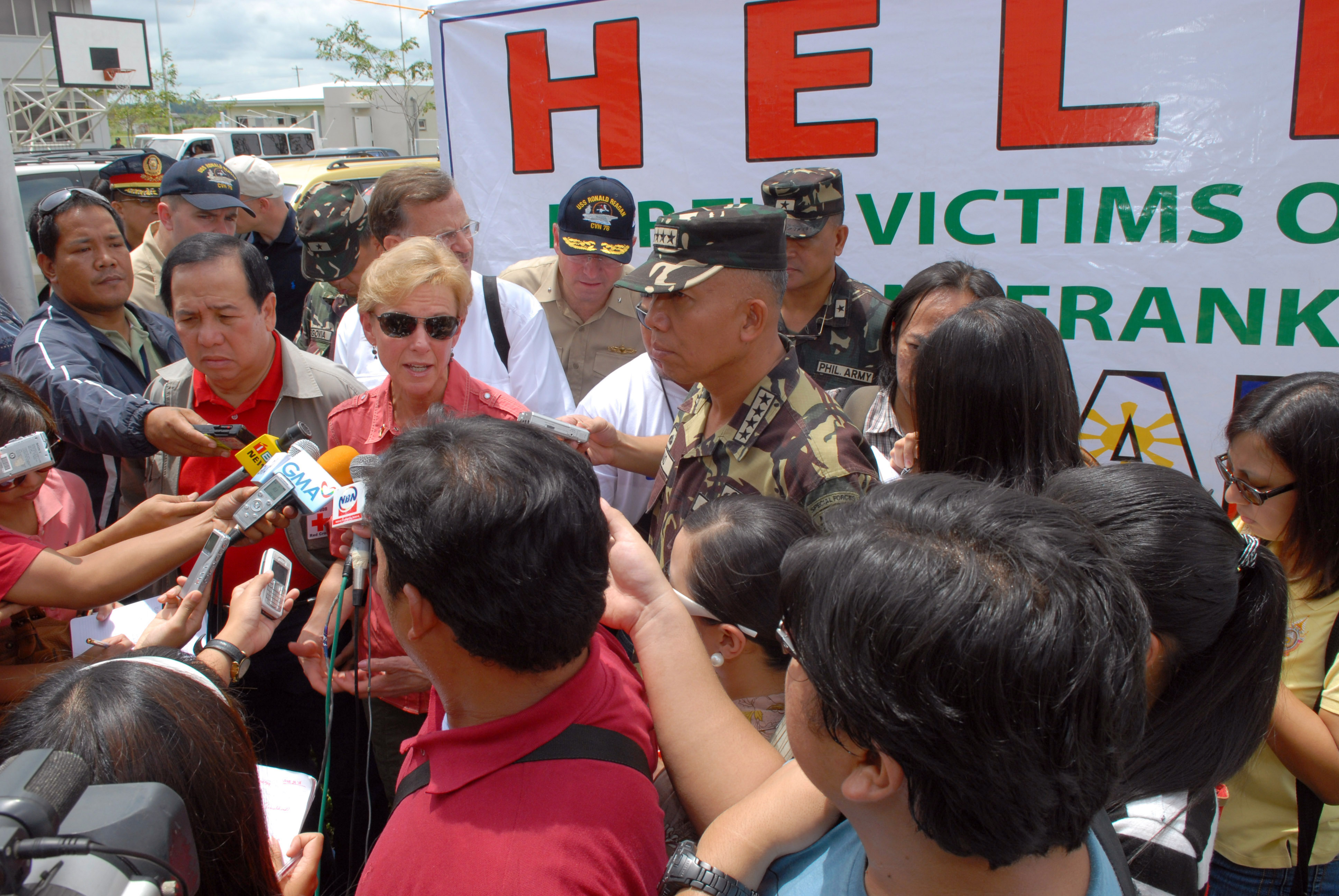
Gordon, with U.S. ambassador to the Philippines Kristie Kenney and Filipino military officers, preparing for relief operations for the victims of Typhoon Frank (June 2008).

In the 2004 election, Gordon ran for senator under the Koalisyon ng Katapatan at Karanasan sa Kinabukasan (transl. Coalition of Truth and Experience for Tomorrow) electoral alliance of President Arroyo. He won the election with 12,707,151 votes, ranking fifth in the overall tabulation.

As senator, Gordon authored laws such as the Filipino World War II Veterans Pensions and Benefits Act, the National Tourism Policy Act, the Free Patent Law, and the Philippine Disaster Reduction and Management Act. He was also responsible for the passage of Automated Elections Systems Law which was piloted in the 2008 Autonomous Region in Muslim Mindanao elections.

As chair of the Senate Blue Ribbon Committee, Gordon investigated the 2004 Fertilizer Fund Scam and the ZTE National Broadband corruption scandal.

=== 2010 presidential election ===
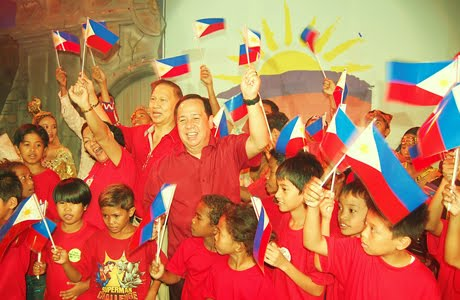
Bagumbayan-VNP's national convention on April 27, 2009

On April 26, 2009, the Bagumbayan Movement held a formal launch event at the Rizal Park and in the Manila Hotel. The movement, which advocated "transformative politics", served to push for the presidential candidacy of Gordon in the upcoming election. It was later recognized as a political party by the Commission on Elections in October 2009.

On November 29, 2009, Metro Manila Development Authority chairman Bayani Fernando revealed that he and Gordon were having discussions on a possible team-up for the 2010 elections. A few days later, on December 1, 2009, Gordon and Fernando officially announced their tandem during a press conference at the senate press office in Pasay, with Gordon running for the presidency and Fernando running for the vice presidency. During the press conference, they billed themselves as "the transformers" who intend to "transform the nation". Later in the day, the tandem filed their certificates of candidacy in the COMELEC main office.

Gordon lost the 2010 presidential election to Benigno Aquino III.

=== 2013 senatorial election ===
On August 28, 2012, the United Nationalist Alliance announced that they will include Gordon among their senatorial bets for the 2013 senatorial election. Gordon failed to win a seat in the senate, having finished 13th overall at 705,940 votes behind 12th-placed Gregorio Honasan.

=== Return to the Senate (2016–2022) ===
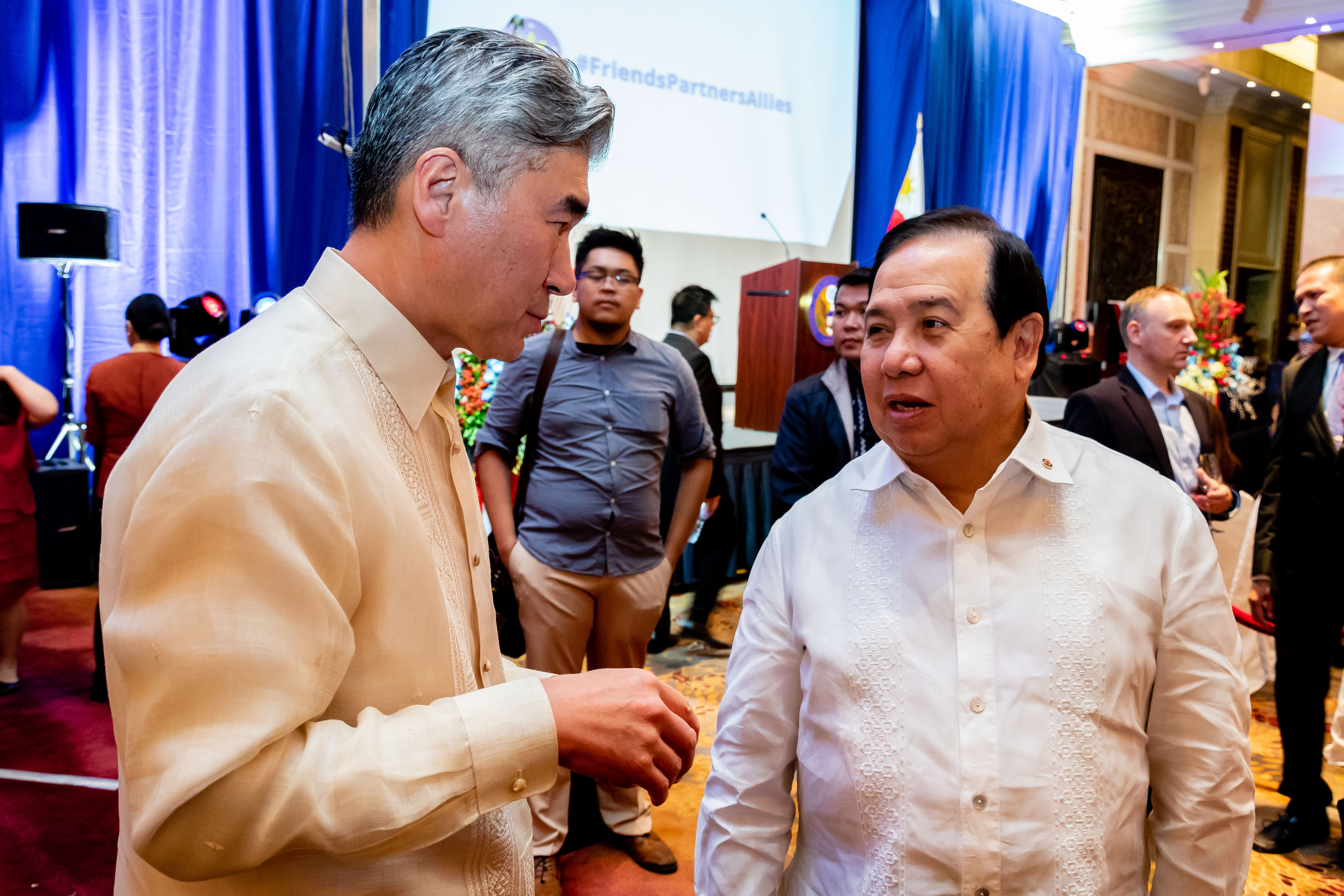
Gordon speaks with United States ambassador to the Philippines, Sung Kim.

Gordon ran in the 2016 Senate election as an independent candidate and won, finishing fifth.

In September 2016, Gordon replaced Senator Leila de Lima as chair of the Senate Committee on Justice and Human Rights, after the senate voted to declare all committee positions vacant. After only six hearings, Gordon controversially ended the senate probe on the rise of killings associated with the Philippine drug war, concluding that the extrajudicial killings were not state sponsored or sanctioned by the Duterte administration. Gordon also found "no proof" that the Davao Death Squad existed or that the killings were ordered by then-Davao mayor Duterte.

On August 15, 2017, Gordon exonerated President Duterte's son Paolo Duterte of involvement in a shabu smuggling scheme. In September 2017, Gordon was one of the seven senators that did not sign a senate resolution urging the government to stop the spate of killings. Gordon claimed, along with the other seven senators, that they were simply not aware of the resolution being passed around.

In January 2019, Gordon defended a proposal to lower the minimum age of criminal responsibility to 12 years old.

In 2021, Gordon headed the senate investigation on the government's procurement of overpriced pandemic-related goods. The probe, which implicated close associates of the president, resulted in Duterte and Gordon engaging in a high profile word war and exchange of legal threats.

In his second stint as senator, Gordon authored or co-authored laws such as the Philippine Passport Act, the Universal Access to Quality Tertiary Education Act, the Police Courts Act, and the Free Irrigation Service Act. Gordon voted to approve the Tax Reform for Acceleration and Inclusion Law. Meanwhile, Gordon was the only senator to oppose the Corporate Recovery and Tax Incentives for Enterprises Bill, which aims to cut corporate income taxes and rationalize tax perks. Gordon has expressed opposition against the reimposition of the death penalty in the Philippines, and has claimed that the proposed Divorce Bill violates the Constitution.

On October 8, 2021, Gordon announced that he would run for re-election as a senator in the 2022 election. The election was held on 9 May 2022; Gordon conceded defeat after early returns from the unofficial and partial COMELEC vote counts indicated that his deficit was too great to overcome. This was confirmed by the final results, in which he finished twenty-second in a race to fill twelve seats representing the nation at large.

== Personal life ==
Gordon is married to Katherine Gordon, who served as congresswoman of the first district of Zambales from 1988 to 1995. She succeeded her husband as mayor of Olongapo in 1995 and served three consecutive terms until 2004. They have four children.

Following the end of his Senate term in 2010, Gordon anchored Aksyon Solusyon with Amelyn Veloso on Radyo5 92.3 News FM and AksyonTV. He also co-hosted Duelo with Jake Macasaet, which aired weeknights on AksyonTV. Gordon also hosted his public service program Lingkod Aksyon, which aired every Sunday morning on TeleRadyo (originally DZMM), alongside Jeffrey Hernaez.

== Awards ==
Gordon is a recipient of various awards, such as the Ten Outstanding Young Men (TOYM), The Outstanding Filipino (TOFIL), the University of the Philippines' Most Outstanding Alumnus in Public Service and its Most Distinguished Alumnus. The latter is the highest award that could be bestowed by the UP Law Alumni Association.

Gordon was also awarded the Philippine National Volunteer Service Coordinating Agency's Lifetime National Volunteer Achievement Award, the sole recipient of the award in 2015.

Gordon has been awarded the three highest awards from the Red Cross: the Aurora Aragon Quezon Medal, the Silver Humanitarian Service Cross Award and the Gold Humanitarian Service Cross Award.

Gordon was also a recipient of the Japanese Red Cross Gold Humanitarian Award. He also received recognition from various foreign media such as Asiaweek's Twenty Great Asians of the Future and Asahi Shimbun's 50 Young Leaders of Asia, among others.

== Ancestry ==
Ancestors of Dick Gordon (politician)

4. John Jacob Gordon
2. James Leonard Gordon
20. Benito Tagle
10. José Tagle
21. Simona Santarin
5. Verónica Tagle
11. Isabel Bella
1. Richard Gordon
3. Amelia Juico

Political offices
Preceded by Office created	Chairman of the Subic Bay Metropolitan Authority; 1992–1998	Succeeded by Felicito Payumo
Preceded by Gemma Cruz Araneta	Secretary of Tourism; 2001–2004	Succeeded by Roberto Pagdanganan
