= Olongapo =

Highly urbanized city in Central Luzon, Philippines

- Highly urbanized city
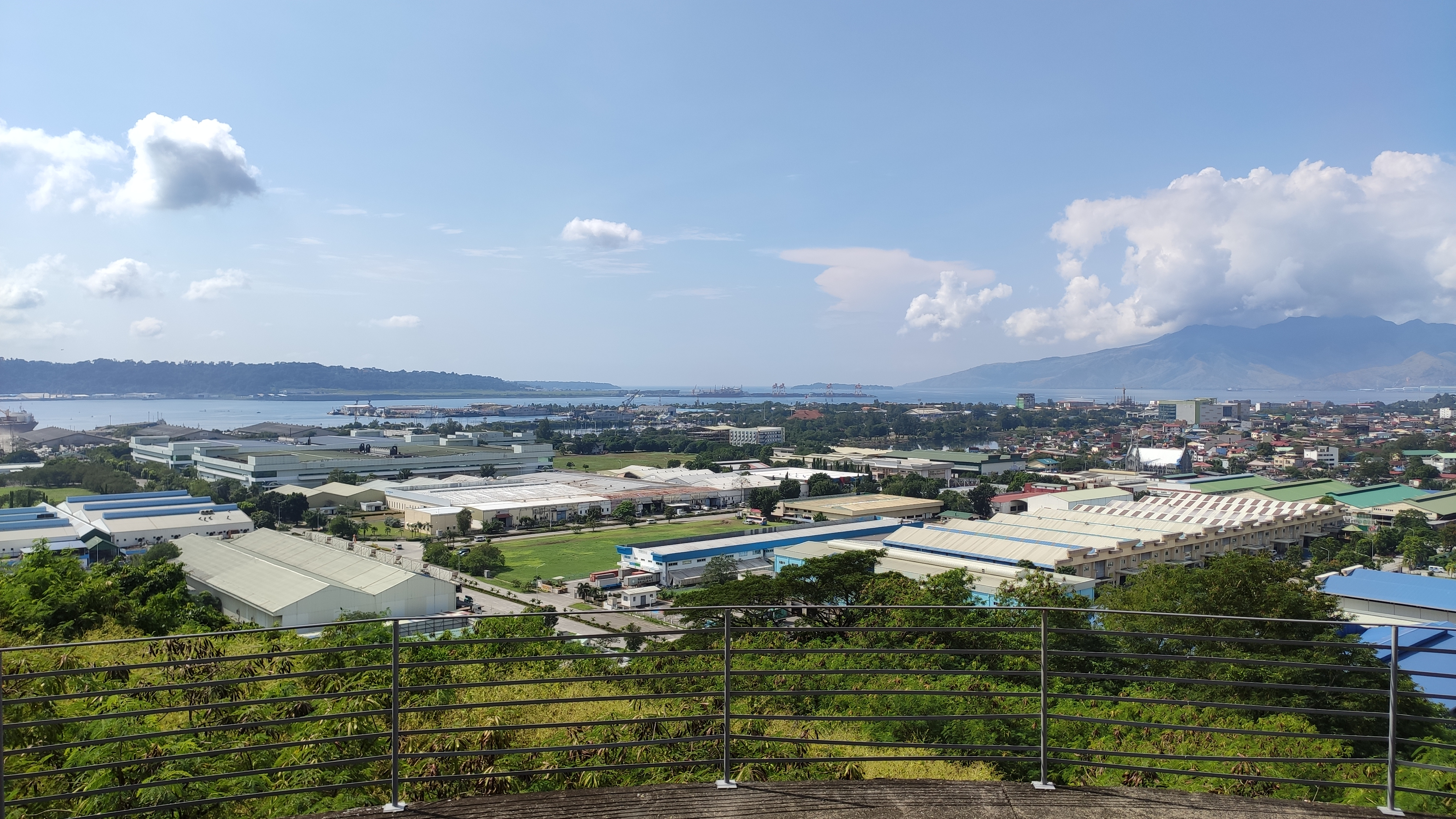
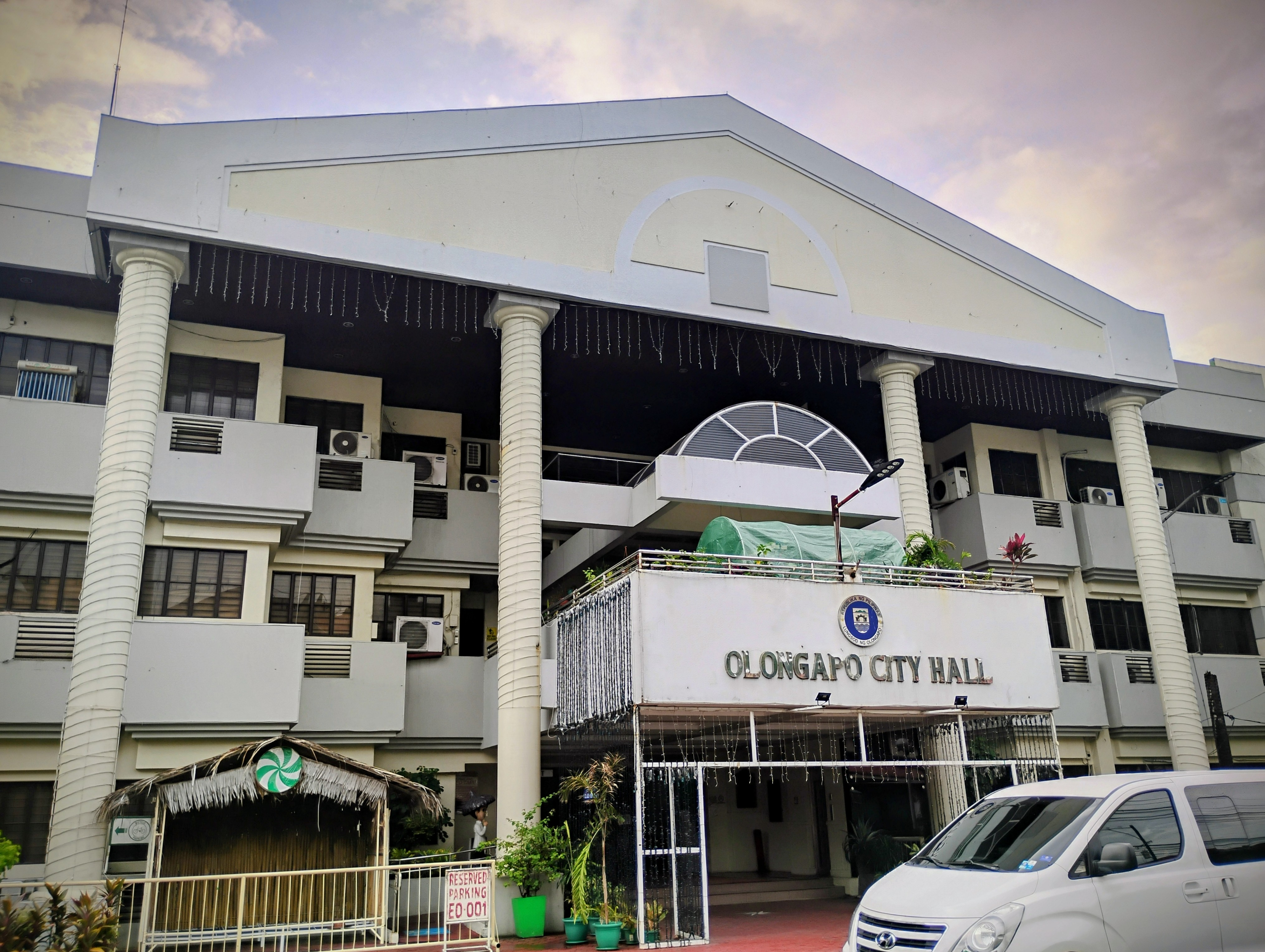
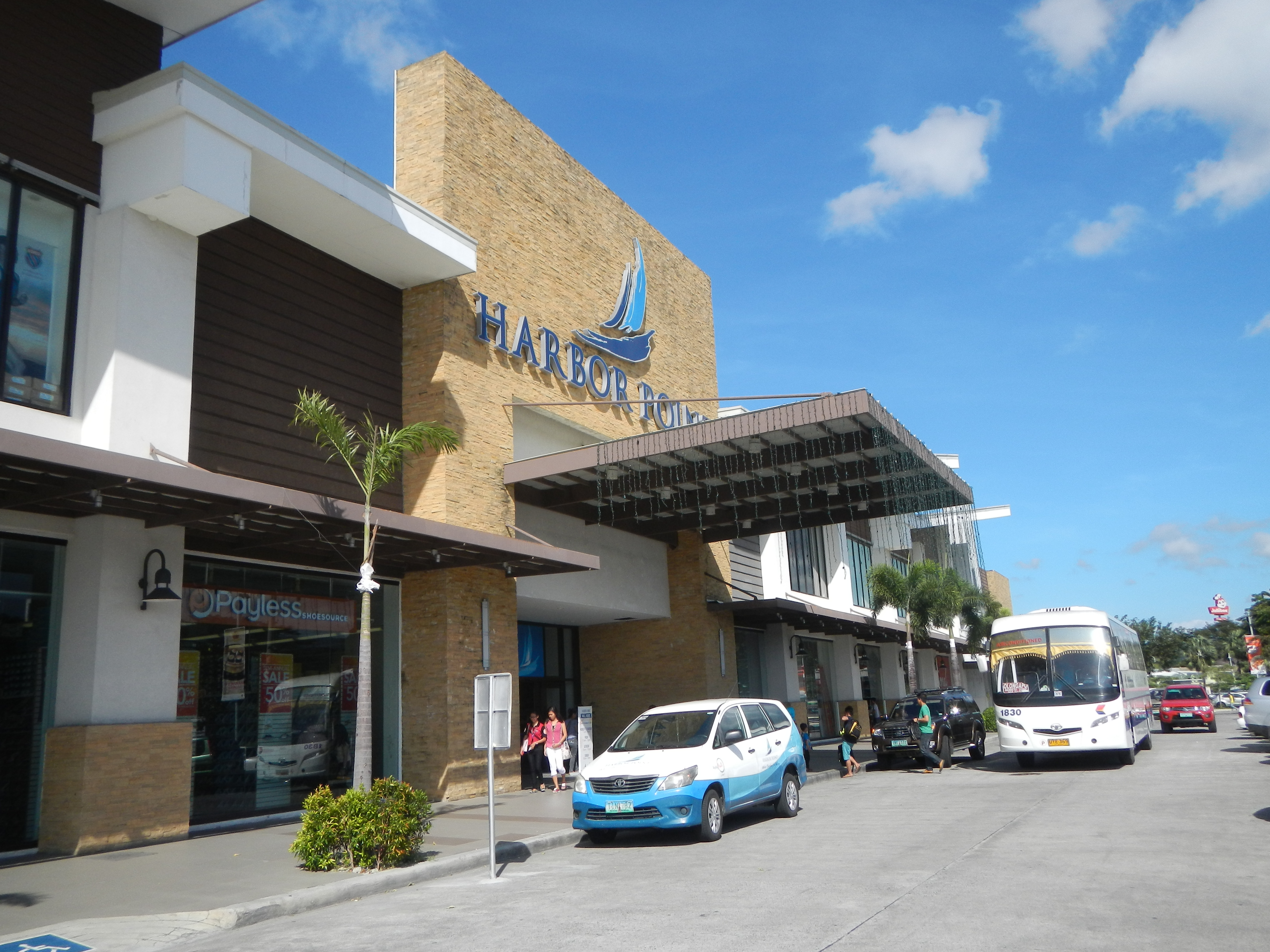
- From top, left to right: Business district in Olongapo, Ulo ng Apo Monument, City Hall, Harbor Point (Subic), SM City Olongapo Central

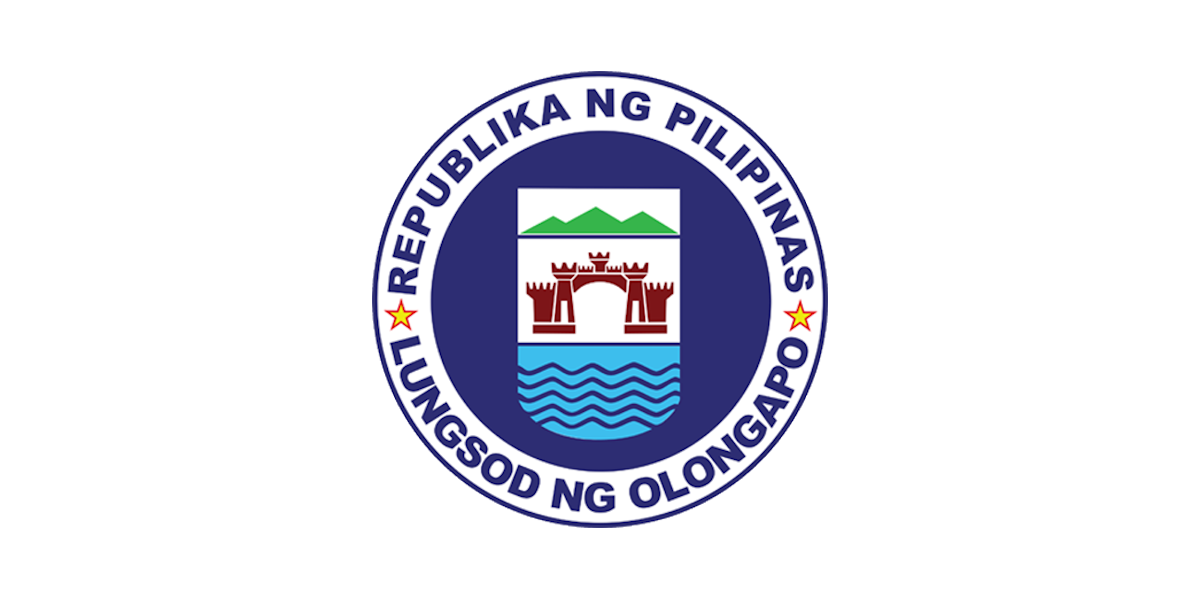
- Flag Seal
- Nickname: City of Volunteers
- Motto: Transparency and Good Governance
- Anthem: Himno ng Olongapo (Hymn of Olongapo)
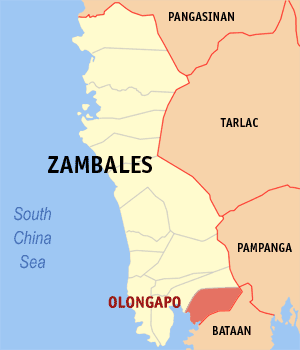
- Map of Central Luzon with Olongapo highlighted
- Interactive map of Olongapo
- Location within the Philippines
- Coordinates: 14°50′N 120°17′E
- Country: Philippines
- Region: Central Luzon
- Province: Zambales (geographically only)
- District: 1st district
- Founded: November 4, 1750
- Cityhood: June 1, 1966
- Highly urbanized city: December 7, 1983
- Barangays: 17 (see Barangays)

Government
  - Type: Sangguniang Panlungsod
  - Mayor: Rolen C. Paulino Jr.
  - Vice Mayor: Kaye Ann S. Legaspi
  - Representative: Jefferson F. Khonghun
  - City Council: Members: Jamiel Jules K. Escalona; Vicente H. Magsaysay II; Cristabell Marie C. Paulino; Rodolfo S. Catalogan Sr.; Noel Y. Atienza; Eyrma Yvette D. Marzan-Estrella; Benjamin G. Cajudo II; Angelito W. Baloy; Ermelando N. Anonat; Jacinto A. Gardon
  - Electorate: 122,899 voters (2025)

Area
  - City: 185.00 km^{2} (71.43 sq mi)
  - Metro: 472.16 km^{2} (182.30 sq mi)
- Elevation: 34 m (112 ft)
- Highest elevation: 1,281 m (4,203 ft)
- Lowest elevation: 0 m (0 ft)

Population (2024 census)
  - City: 264,903
  - Density: 1,431.9/km^{2} (3,708.6/sq mi)
  - Metro: 337,811
  - Metro density: 715.46/km^{2} (1,853.0/sq mi)
  - Households: 66,450
- Demonym(s): Olongapeño (masculine); Olongapeña (Feminine); Olongapenean

Economy
  - Income class: 1st city income class
  - Poverty incidence: 11.5% (2023)
  - Revenue: ₱ 2,221 million (2024)
  - Assets: ₱ 10,714 million (2024)
  - Expenditure: ₱ 2,165 million (2024)
  - Liabilities: ₱ 7,754 million (2024)

Service provider
  - Electricity: Olongapo Electricity Distribution Company (OEDC)
- ZIP code: 2200, 2222 (Subic Special Economic and Freeport Zone)
- PSGC: 037107000
- IDD : area code: +63 (0)47
- Native languages: Tagalog; Ilocano; Sambal; Kapampangan; Ambala
- Website: www.olongapocity.gov.ph

Olongapo ([ʔoˌloːŋ.ɡɐˈpo]), officially the City of Olongapo (Filipino: Lungsod ng Olongapo; Ilocano: Siudad ti Olongapo; Sambal: Siyodad nin Olongapo; Kapampangan: Lakanbalen/Ciudad ning Olongapo), is a highly urbanized city situated in the Central Luzon region of the Philippines. According to the 2024 census, it has a population of 264,903 people.

It is geographically situated and grouped under the province of Zambales by the Philippine Statistics Authority but governed independently and is also its largest city. Portions of the city also form part of the Subic Special Economic and Freeport Zone.

Along with the municipality of Subic, it comprises Metro Olongapo, one of the twelve metropolitan areas in the Philippines.

== History ==
=== Spanish colonial era ===
In 1868, a Spanish military expedition was dispatched to study the possibility of relocating the Cavite Naval Station in Subic Bay due to its unhealthy conditions.

Spanish King Alfonso XII through a royal decree made Subic Bay (then called Subig) as Spain's stronghold in the Far East in 1884. Vice Admiral Juan Bautista de Antiquiera made Olongapo a settlement for the Spanish Navy.

On March 8, 1885, the Spanish Naval commission authorized the construction of the Arsenal in Olongapo. The Spanish planned to transform their naval station and the village of Olongapo into an island, safeguarding it from potential rebel attacks. The Spanish Navy Yard occupied the entire area east of the Spanish Gate. Employing Filipino labor, they did extensive dredging of the harbor and the inner basin and built a drainage canal. The canal served both to drain the swampy area around the yard and also to form a line of defense.

Within 10 years, the Spaniards had erected walls and markers to fence off the arsenal. They had shops and buildings erected. The Spanish government spent almost fifteen years developing the naval station. From higher naval commands, the order was sent to fortify Grande Island at the mouth of Subic Bay. In the meantime, during the Philippine Revolution, a fleet led by the Cuban-Filipino Admiral Vicente Catalan seized the naval base at Subic-Olongapo from the Spanish for the First Philippine Republic.

=== American occupation ===
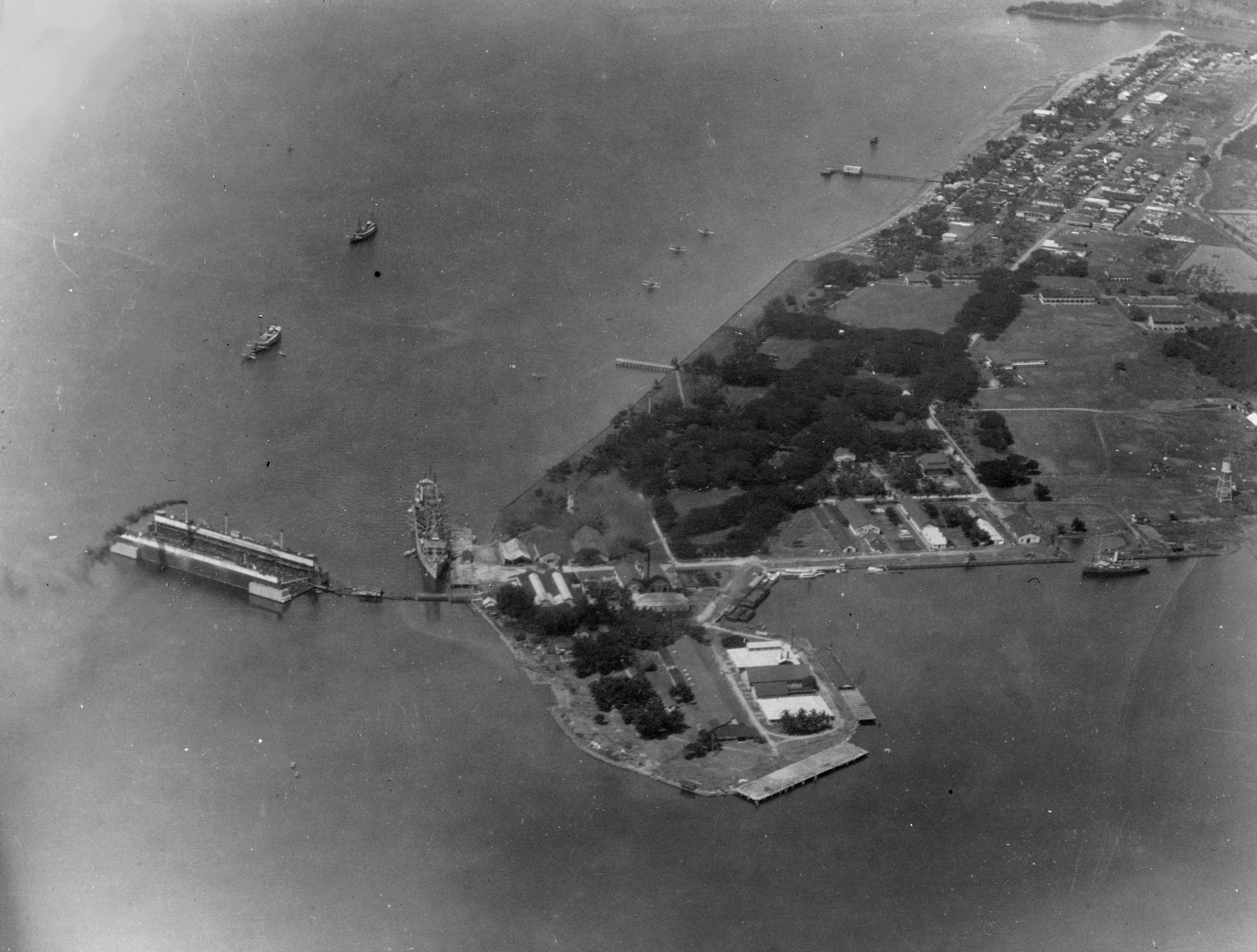
Aerial view of the Olongapo Naval Station in 1928

On May 1, 1898, the construction of the Spanish Administration Building was nearly complete when Admiral Dewey's flagship, USS Olympia, led the Asiatic Fleet into Manila Bay. A detachment of Dewey's fleet bombarded the navy yard. Eventually, after the surrender, Spain relinquished all her rights in the Philippines to the United States. This marked the end of more than three hundred years of Spanish rule over the islands.

Realizing the tremendous importance of Olongapo as a naval facility, the U.S. Navy decided to keep the base in functioning order; US President Theodore Roosevelt, on November 9, 1901, by executive order, reserved the waters of Subic and some of the adjacent lands for naval purposes.

The naval station was widened and with the establishment of the American rule in the Philippines. American defenses in the islands were facilities left by the Spanish Navy which were taken over by the United States.

Olongapo grew in direct proportion to the growth of the naval station. More people came to live in Olongapo since the Navy offered employment. To most Filipinos during that time, it was a welcome change. The promise of a different kind of experience as shop workers and office help induced many young men to leave their farms and fishing boats to work in the Navy Yard. Others finding the lure of the sea irresistible joined the U.S. Navy.

Pre-war Olongapo impressed its visitors as being one of the finest communities in the country, praised for its cleanliness and orderliness.

=== Japanese occupation ===
When the war broke out in 1941, the old town was obliterated. Olongapo was twice destroyed.

On December 14, 1941, Japanese bombers attacked the Olongapo/Subic Bay area. Ten days later, the order was given to burn Subic Bay Naval Station and withdraw. Olongapo was set aflame by the Filipinos in anticipation of the Japanese arrival. The USS New York was scuttled in Subic Bay. When the American forces made a last-ditch stand on the Bataan peninsula, the Naval Station was abandoned and most of its facilities were burned before the Japanese came.

In 1945, Olongapo was again bombed, shelled and burned. Joint American and Philippine Commonwealth ground troops aided guerrilla fighters in liberating Olongapo from the Japanese forces. With the exceptions of the Station Chapel (the Olongapo Parish Church before the war) and the Spanish Gate, none of its former landmarks withstood the war. The general headquarters between the United States Army, Philippine Commonwealth Army & Philippine Constabulary were located in Olongapo during and after World War II, and were active until 1946 after operating against the Japanese for the liberation of Central Luzon.

=== Postwar era ===
In 1946, the Philippines was granted independence. Olongapo was one of the principal naval bases retained by the United States. The Navy started rebuilding the town after hostilities ceased. Olongapo was built on a new undeveloped site a couple of miles north of its former location. The prewar town site became part of the base.

The first few years after the war were difficult for the new town, as everything in the new Olongapo was damaged. There were no electric power and no drainage system. The water supply and sanitation facilities were inadequate, and streets were unpaved. Gradually, Olongapo evolved into a new community: new businesses were established, housing projects were planned and civic facilities were restored.

During the Korean War, the United States spent over US$170 million to convert the base into the homeport of the Navy's Seventh Fleet, developing the Cubi Naval Air Station as the largest US installation of its kind in Asia. Naval authorities relocated the residence from the area of the former Public Works Center area to the intersection of what is now known as Rizal Avenue and Ramon Magsaysay Drive, and in the Barangays New Asinan and New Kalalake areas. Zoning of Olongapo was patterned after American practice where streets are constructed along straight lines. The magnitude of facilities construction in the Olongapo and Subic Bay area brought growth and prosperity to Olongapo. By 1956, migrants from nearby towns and provinces had swelled the population to 39,180.

=== Cityhood ===
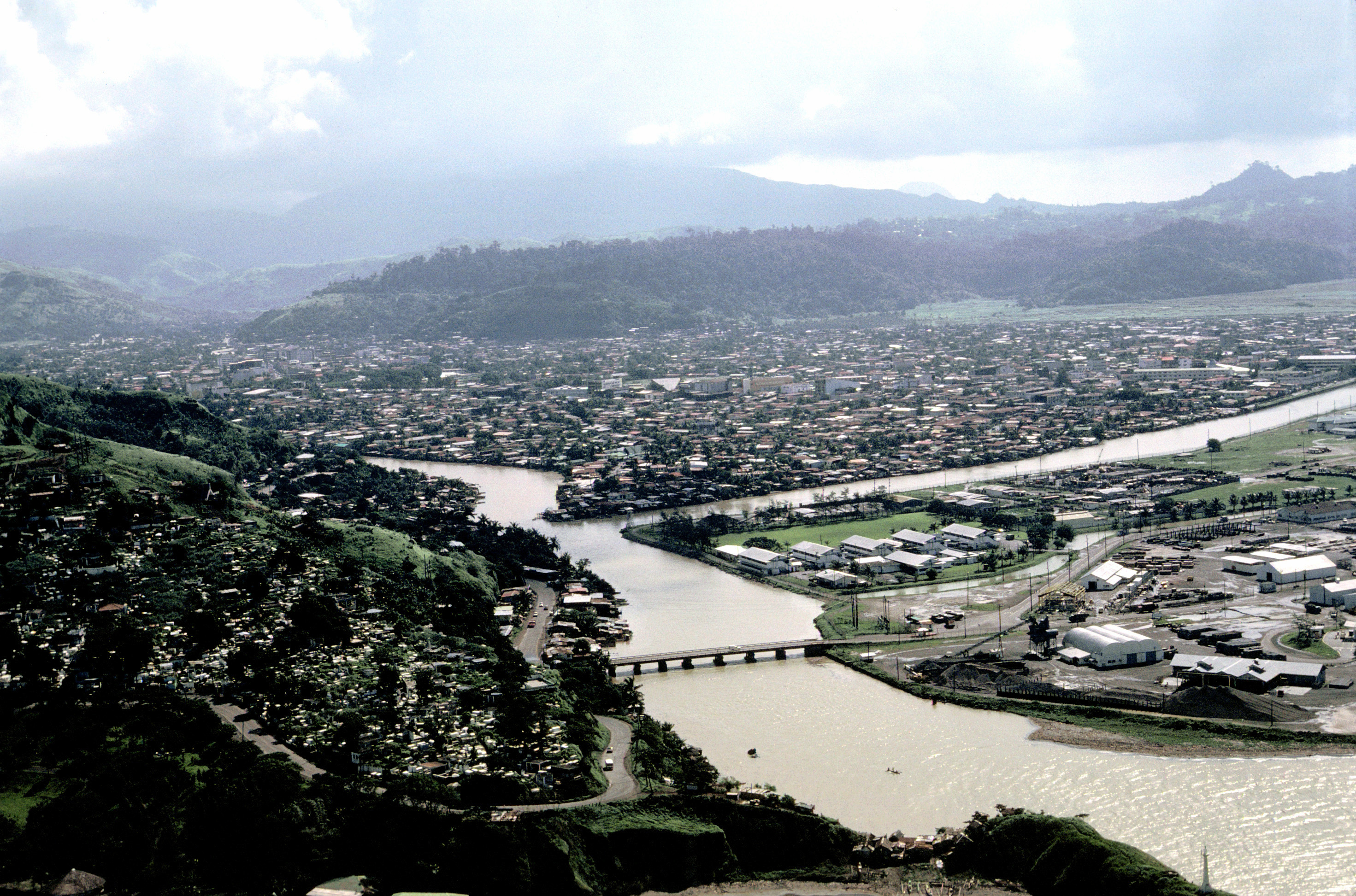
Bridge leading to NS Subic Bay, 1981

Unlike the rest of the Philippines which gained independence from the United States after World War II in 1946, Olongapo was governed as a part of the United States naval reservation. The Subic Bay Naval Base commanding officer was chairman of the Olongapo town council, school board, and hospital board. Olongapo's 60,000 Filipino residents paid taxes to the US Navy and those accused of crimes involving American servicemen were tried in US Navy courts. In July 1955, Manila mayor Arsenio Lacson announced that American service personnel accused of crimes in Manila would be tried in Philippine courts because of US Navy abuses of Filipinos in Olongapo.

On October 23, 1959, Olongapo was placed under martial law when Robert Grant, the American owner of an Olongapo auto parts store was killed and the US Navy declined to identify or try the Naval Supply Depot sentry who shot him.

Olongapo was the last piece of Philippine territory surrendered by the United States to the country in the 1950s. On December 7, 1959, 56,000 acres of land with electrical, telephone and water utilities was relinquished to Philippine Secretary of Foreign Affairs Felixberto Serrano. The first mayor appointed was civic leader Ruben Geronimo. He was later succeeded by business entrepreneur Ildefonso Arriola.

Six years later, through the efforts of Representative Ramon Magsaysay Jr. in Congress and Senator Genaro Magsaysay in the Senate, President Ferdinand Marcos signed R.A. 4645. Olongapo was reconverted to a chartered city on June 1, 1966.

Olongapo was eventually upgraded to the status of a highly urbanized city (HUC) on December 7, 1983.

=== Marcos dictatorship era ===
The beginning months of the 1970s marked a period of turmoil and change in the Philippines, as well as in Olongapo and Zambales. During his bid to be the first Philippine president to be re-elected for a second term, Ferdinand Marcos launched an unprecedented number of foreign debt-funded public works projects. This caused the Philippine economy to take a sudden downwards turn known as the 1969 Philippine balance of payments crisis, which in turn led to a period of economic difficulty and a significant rise of social unrest.

With only a year left in his last constitutionally allowed term as president, Ferdinand Marcos placed the Philippines under Martial Law in September 1972 and thus retained the position for fourteen more years. This period in Philippine history is remembered for the Marcos administration's record of human rights abuses, particularly targeting political opponents, student activists, journalists, religious workers, farmers, and others who fought against the Marcos dictatorship.

In Olongapo, the continuation of the Vietnam war through this period meant the arrival of a constantly growing number of U.S. Sailors to adjacent U.S. Naval Base Subic Bay, which was headed by Manuel Ardonia. The base was visited by 215 ships per month as the Vietnam War peaked in 1967, and it employed 15,000 Filipino civilians.

However, this also meant the rapid growth of prostitution in the areas around the base. The policies of the Marcos administration encouraged the growth of the sex industry because it increased the flow of higher value currency into the Philippine economy.

The economies of Olongapo and the nearby areas of Zambales evolved from a largely agricultural orientation at the end of the 1960s towards one built around sex industry related businesses such as bars by the mid-1970s. The nightclubs along Ramon Magsaysay Drive between the naval base main gate and Rizal Avenue were notoriously popular among the 4,225,000 servicemen visiting the base that year. Sailors' accounts recall the popularity of musical performances, inexpensive San Miguel beer, attractive teenage prostitutes, erotic floor shows, Jeepney rides back to the naval base and children diving for coins tossed from the bridge over the estuarine drainage channel in front of the naval base main gate.

=== Mount Pinatubo eruption ===
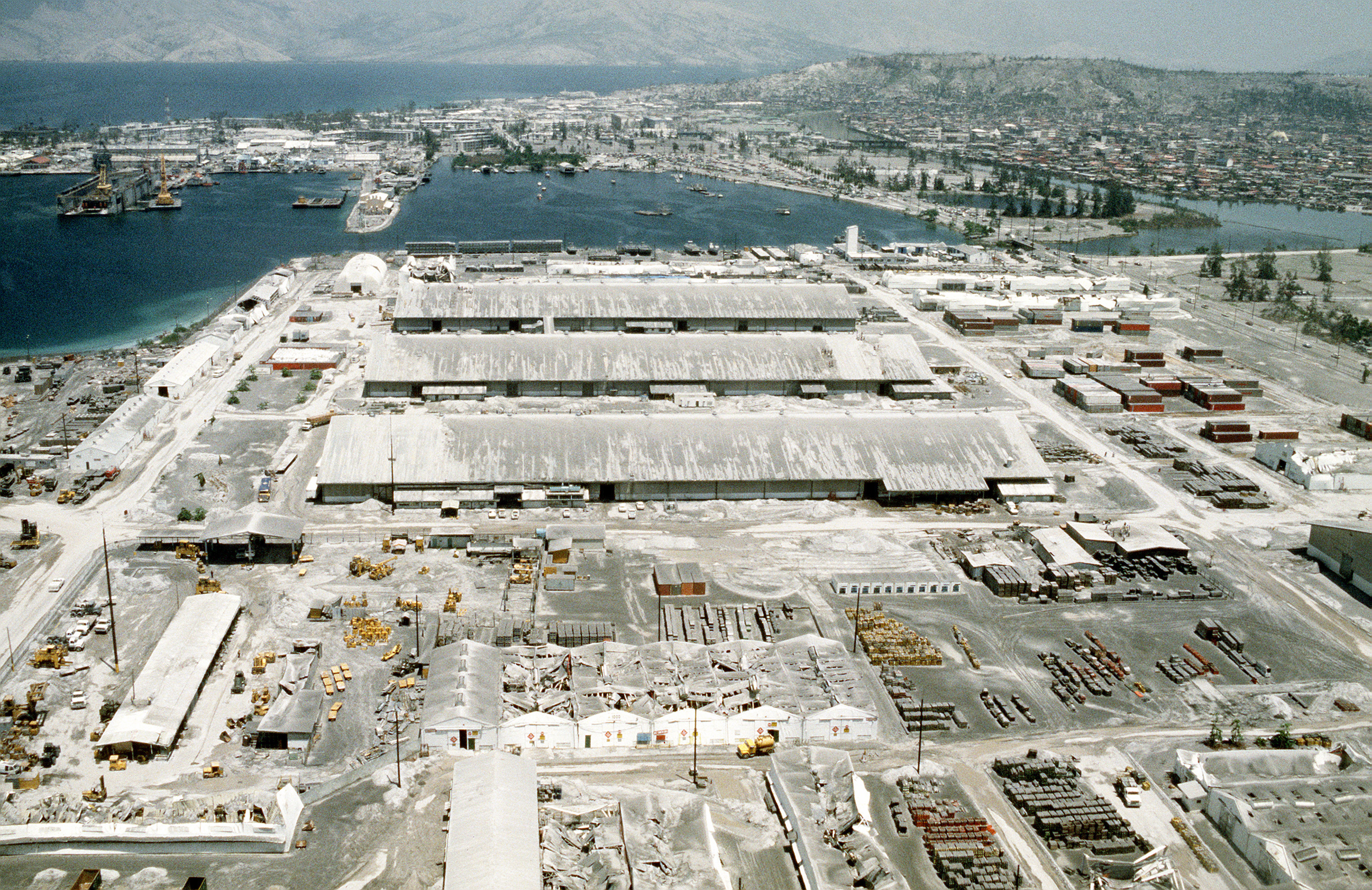
Mount Pinatubo ash covers Naval Station Subic Bay.

On June 15, 1991, Mount Pinatubo, 20 miles (32 kilometres) from the city, violently erupted with a force eight times greater than the May 1980 eruption of Mount St. Helens. Volcanic clouds blocked out the sun. Volcanic earthquakes and heavy muddy rain, as well as thunderstorms from a typhoon passing over Central Luzon, darkened the area for 36 hours in what would become known as "Black Saturday". This caused widespread damage to the United States facility and Olongapo City.

On September 16, 1991, the Senate leaders of the Philippines did not grant an extension of the existing RP-US Military Bases Agreement between the Republic of the Philippines and the United States, thus terminating the stay of the United States military in the Philippines.

=== Contemporary era ===
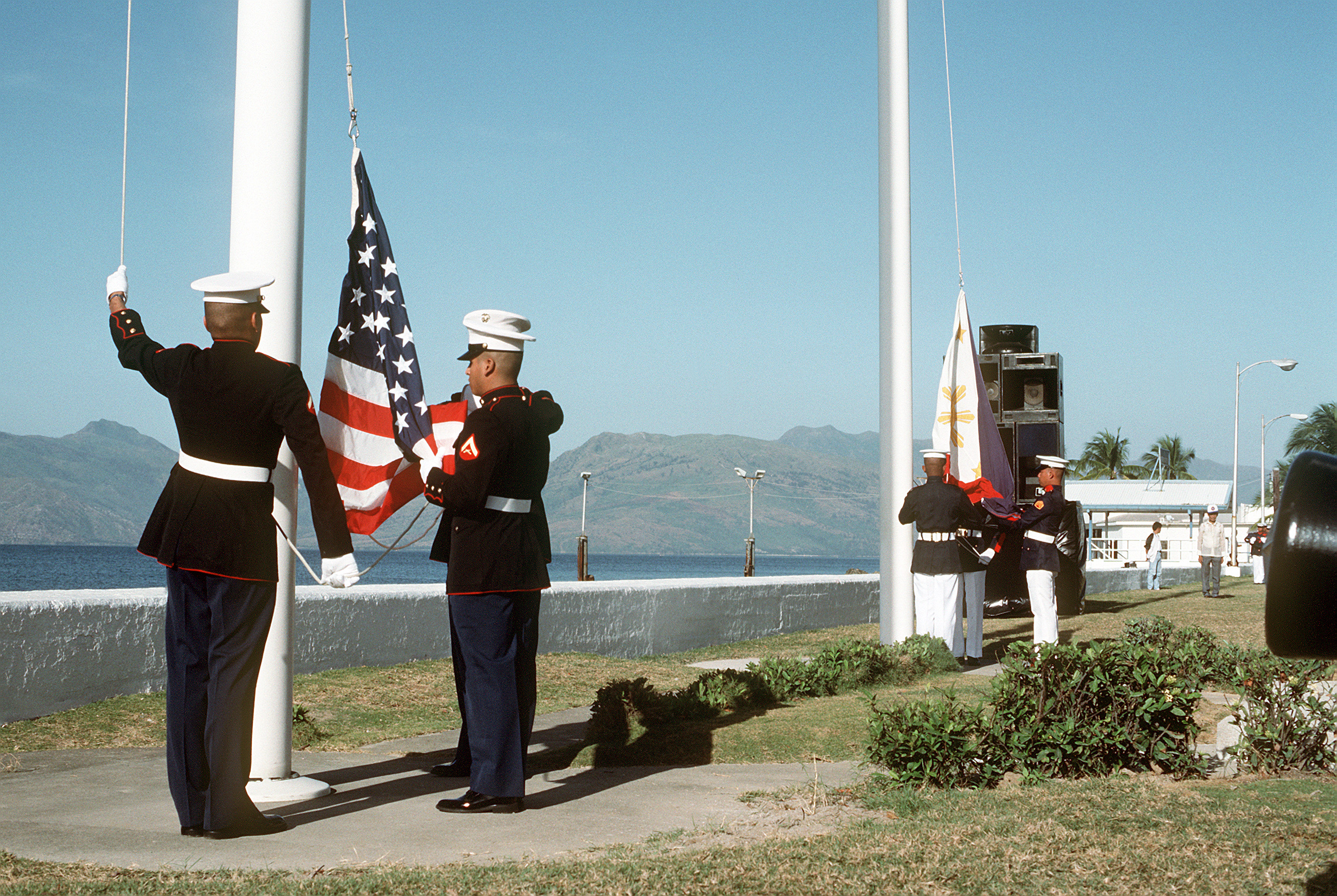
The U.S. flag is lowered and Philippine flag is raised during turnover of Naval Station Subic Bay.

Olongapo surged to national prominence during the incumbency of Mayor Richard Gordon, who, like his father before him, was against the departure of US military forces, yet lobbied for the turnover of the facility and its conversion into a freeport in 1992. Gordon spearheaded a volunteerism strategy to return an ailing economy to prosperity after Mount Pinatubo's eruption and the withdrawal of US forces. The strategy worked across all demographics and involved a strong corps of 8,000 volunteers who protected and preserved the abandoned base facilities from poachers. Gordon complemented this with an aggressive advocacy campaign to convert the area into a protected area and industrial zone. Later, he launched an aggressive international investment promotion which resulted in the accelerating the development of a prime industrial and tourism zone in the country, the Subic Bay Freeport Zone (SBFZ).

As the first chartered city and highly urbanized city in its province, Olongapo's reputation among Filipinos rose from being a "sin city" in the 1960s and 1970s into a "model city" in the 1980s, 1990s and 2000s.

A recent racial study showed that Angeles City, Pampanga; alongside Manila; and Olongapo, Zambales; was the locations of several concentrations of 250,000 Amerasians (Mixed American-Asians) who were born as a result of the American colonization of the Philippines and the presence of US bases in the country.

== Geography ==
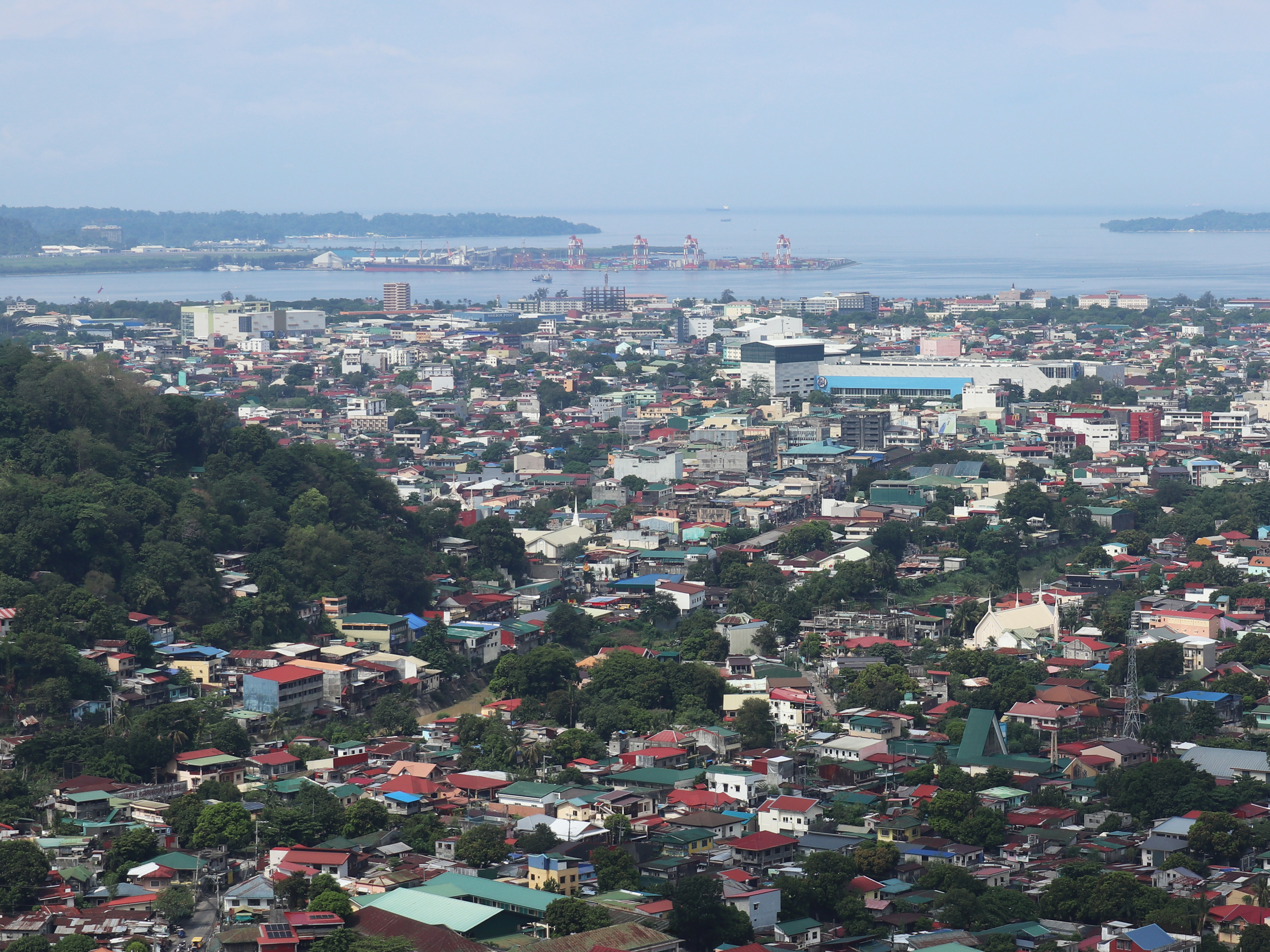
City skyline

Situated at the southern entry point of Zambales and the northeastern interior of the Subic Bay area, Olongapo City is 78 kilometers (48 mi) from Iba and 126 kilometres (78 mi) northwest of Manila.

The land area of Olongapo is 103.3 square kilometers (39.9 sq mi). The city proper is located on 6.48 square kilometers (2.50 sq mi) of tidal flatland, with the rugged Zambales Mountains on its three sides, and Bataan and Subic Bay at its base. Because of this peculiar geographic location, development of city land is limited. Also, the territorial borders from nearby towns are not properly marked.

=== Climate ===
Climate data for Olongapo (weather station located in Subic, Zambales) 1992–2010, extremes recorded in Naval Air Station Cubi Point 1994–2012
Month	Jan	Feb	Mar	Apr	May	Jun	Jul	Aug	Sep	Oct	Nov	Dec	Year
Record high °C (°F)	35.2 (95.4)	38.0 (100.4)	36.5 (97.7)	38.2 (100.8)	38.8 (101.8)	37.7 (99.9)	36.2 (97.2)	35.0 (95.0)	35.7 (96.3)	35.3 (95.5)	34.7 (94.5)	34.4 (93.9)	38.8 (101.8)
Mean daily maximum °C (°F)	31.2 (88.2)	32.1 (89.8)	33.5 (92.3)	34.5 (94.1)	33.1 (91.6)	31.7 (89.1)	30.9 (87.6)	30.4 (86.7)	30.7 (87.3)	31.6 (88.9)	31.7 (89.1)	31.0 (87.8)	31.9 (89.4)
Daily mean °C (°F)	26.8 (80.2)	27.4 (81.3)	28.5 (83.3)	29.6 (85.3)	29.1 (84.4)	28.2 (82.8)	27.7 (81.9)	27.4 (81.3)	27.5 (81.5)	27.9 (82.2)	27.8 (82.0)	27.1 (80.8)	27.9 (82.2)
Mean daily minimum °C (°F)	22.5 (72.5)	22.7 (72.9)	23.6 (74.5)	24.8 (76.6)	25.1 (77.2)	24.8 (76.6)	24.4 (75.9)	24.4 (75.9)	24.3 (75.7)	24.2 (75.6)	23.9 (75.0)	23.2 (73.8)	24.0 (75.2)
Record low °C (°F)	17.9 (64.2)	18.7 (65.7)	19.8 (67.6)	21.5 (70.7)	21.5 (70.7)	19.0 (66.2)	20.0 (68.0)	21.4 (70.5)	21.0 (69.8)	20.6 (69.1)	20.6 (69.1)	18.5 (65.3)	17.9 (64.2)
Average rainfall mm (inches)	6.0 (0.24)	4.2 (0.17)	16.1 (0.63)	22.5 (0.89)	416.8 (16.41)	385.7 (15.19)	759.7 (29.91)	753.5 (29.67)	695.8 (27.39)	214.5 (8.44)	81.9 (3.22)	21.9 (0.86)	3,378.6 (133.02)
Average rainy days (≥ 0.1 mm)	2	1	3	3	12	17	23	24	21	13	8	5	132
Average relative humidity (%)	67	66	65	65	73	78	81	81	82	77	73	68	73
Source: PAGASA

Olongapo has a tropical monsoon climate (Köppen climate classification: Am). Temperatures are relatively cooler during the months of December, January and February, and increase slightly from March to May, which are the warmest months of the year in this part of the Philippines.

The months of December to April are extremely dry but the wet season persists for the remaining period in a year. In July and August, the monthly rainfall totals reach around 750 millimeters (30 in).

The city receives an average of 3,375 millimetres (132.9 in) rainfall every year. Temperatures range from an average of around 26.3 degrees Celsius (79.3 degrees Fahrenheit) degrees in January to around 29.4 °C (84.9 °F) in April.

=== Barangays ===
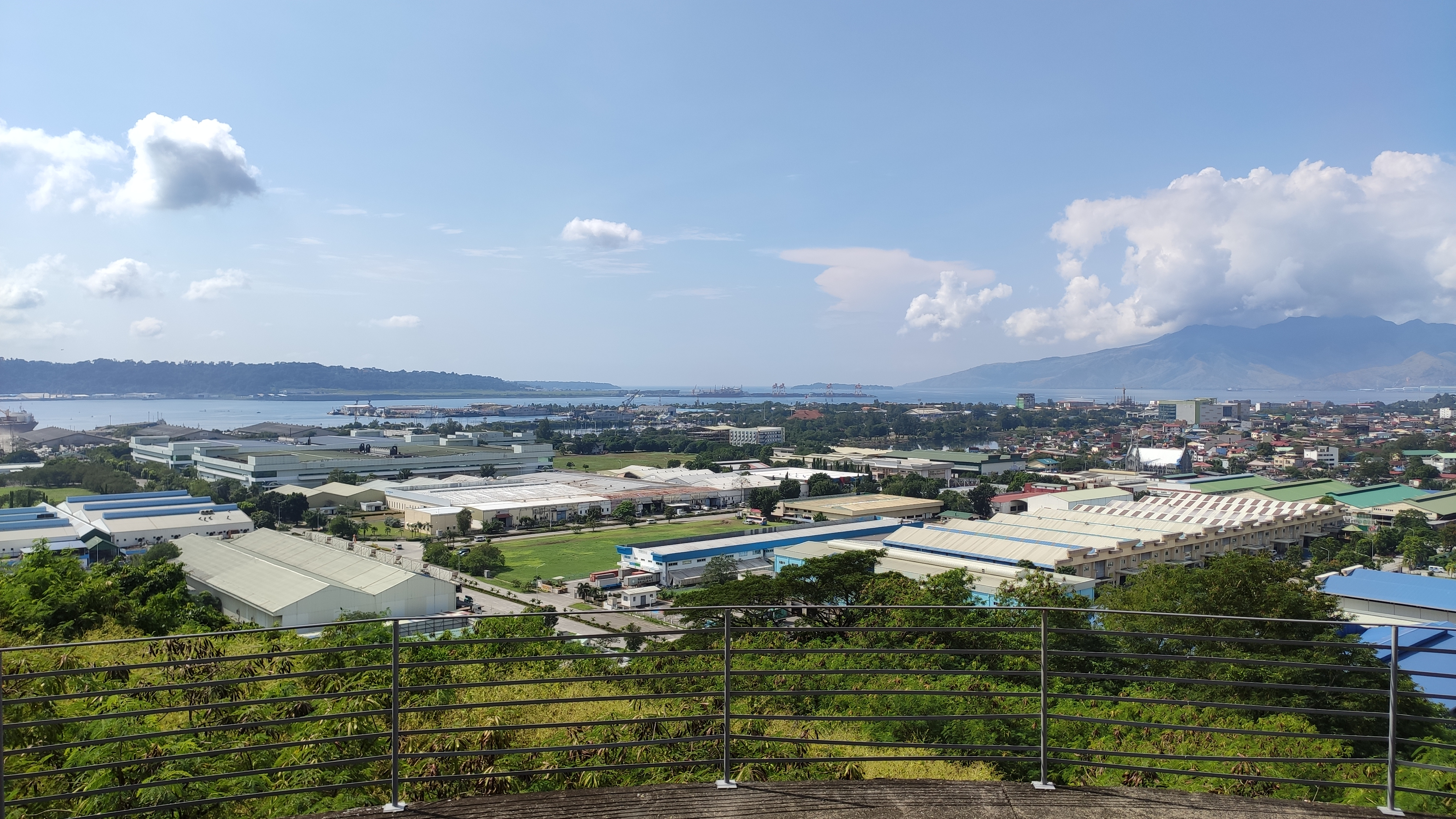
Business district in Olongapo, which includes the barangays of Asinan, East Tapinac, New Kalalake, and Pag-asa

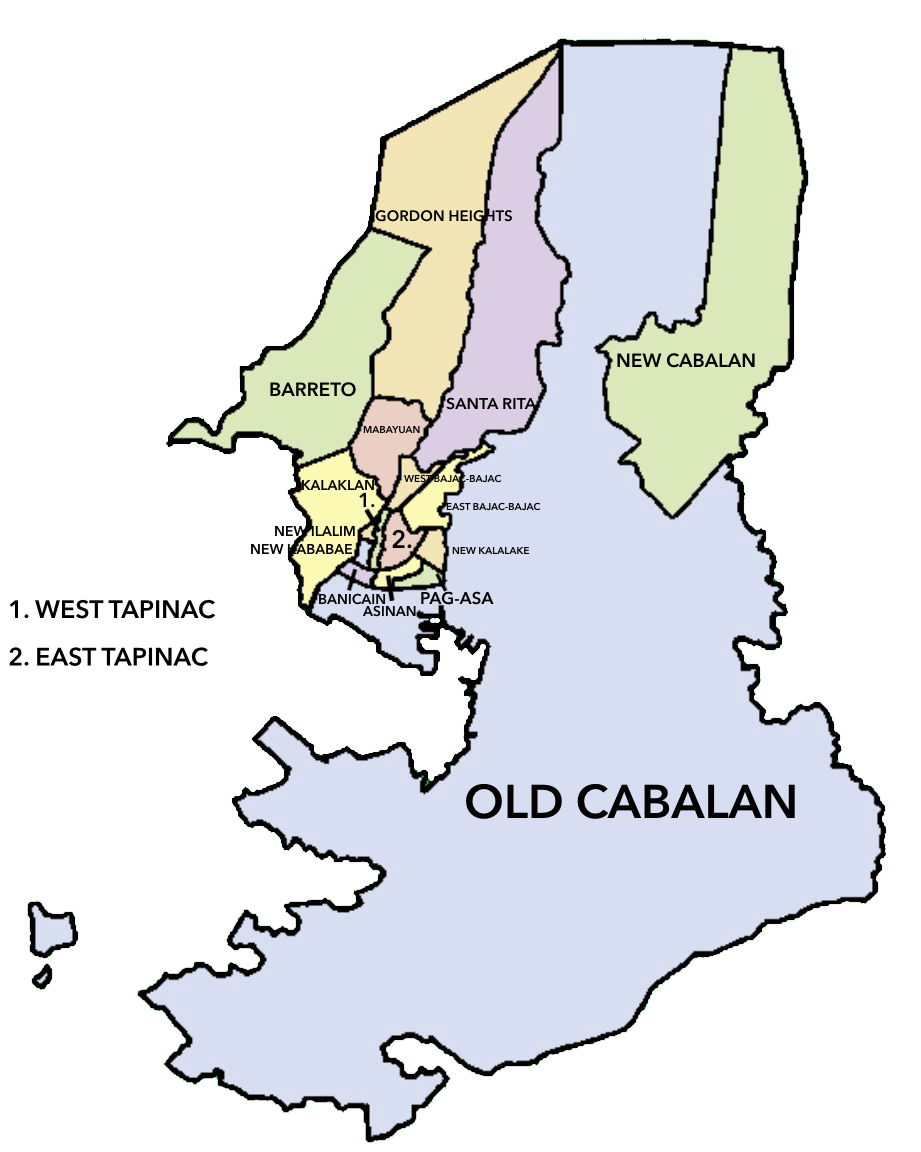
Barangay map of Olongapo City

Olongapo is politically subdivided into 17 barangays, as indicated below. Each barangay consists of puroks and some have sitios.

- Barretto
- East Bajac-bajac
- East Tapinac
- Gordon Heights
- Kalaklan
- Mabayuan
- New Asinan
- New Banicain
- New Cabalan
- New Ilalim
- New Kababae
- New Kalalake
- Old Cabalan
- Pag-asa
- Santa Rita
- West Bajac-bajac
- West Tapinac

== Demographics ==
Population census of Olongapo
Year	Pop.	±% p.a.
1960	45,330	—
1970	107,785	+9.04%
1975	147,109	+6.44%
1980	156,430	+1.24%
1990	193,327	+2.14%
1995	179,754	−1.35%
2000	194,260	+1.68%
2007	227,270	+2.19%
2010	221,178	−0.98%
2015	233,040	+1.00%
2020	260,317	+2.36%
2024	264,903	+0.42%
Source: Philippine Statistics Authority

In the 2024 census, the population of Olongapo was 264,903 people, with a density of 1,400 inhabitants per square kilometer or 3,600 inhabitants per square mile.

=== Language ===
Tagalog is the predominant language spoken in the city. Other native languages may be spoken include Sambal, Kapampangan, and Ilocano.

=== Religion ===
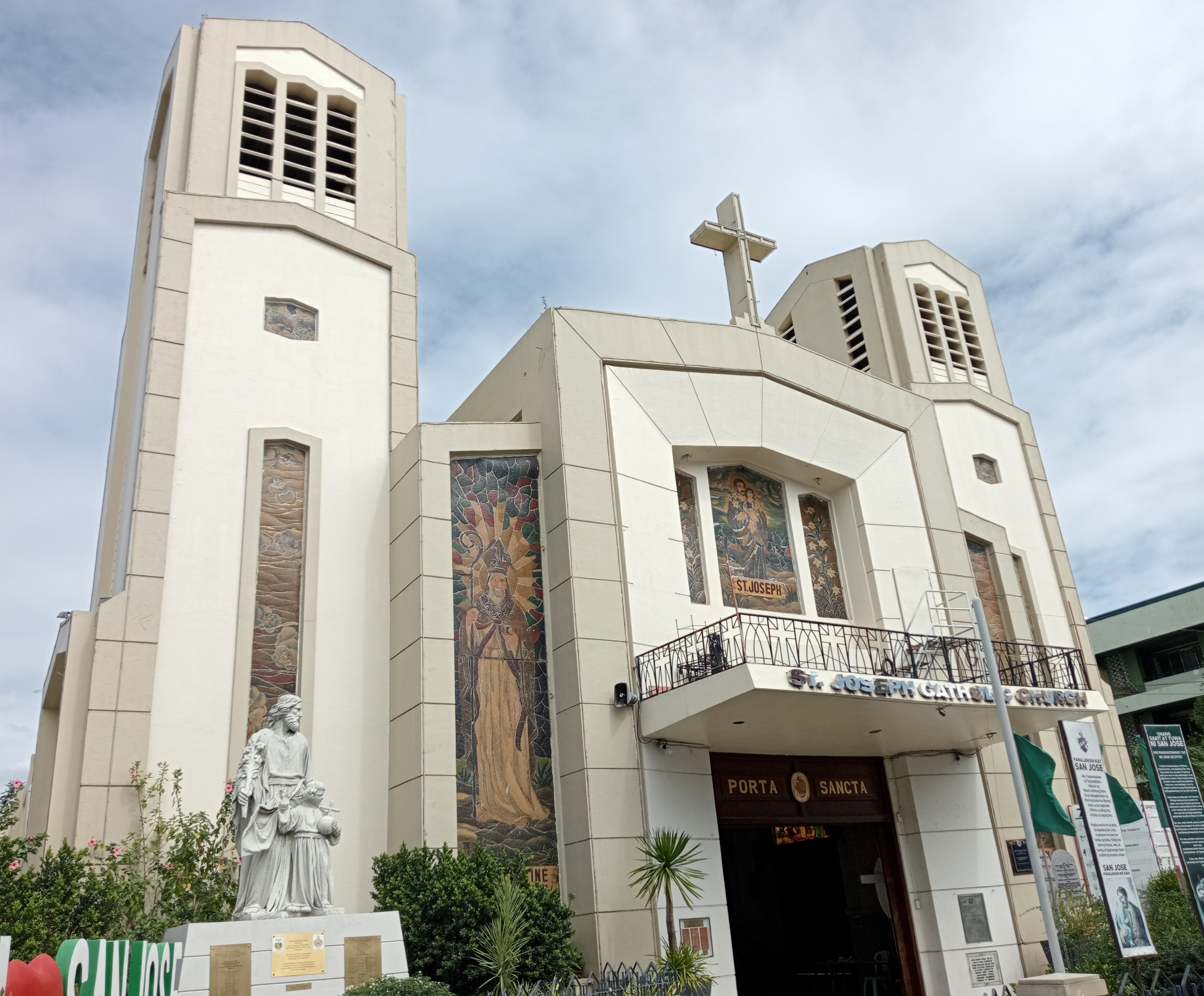
Saint Joseph Parish Church

Majority of the people of Olongapo are Roman Catholics, followed by members of the Iglesia ni Cristo, the second largest group in the city, which has 3-5% of the population. Protestants, Evangelicals, Born Again, Jehovah's Witnesses, Mormons, Members Church of God International, Nichiren Buddhism (Sokka Gakkai International), United Methodist Church, and Islam are also present.

The People's Recovery, Empowerment and Development Assistance Foundation, PREDA, was established by Columban Missionaries led by Fr Shay Cullen in Olongapo City in 1974.

==== Vicariate ====
The ten Roman Catholic parishes of Olongapo City are grouped as the Vicariate of San Jose and fall within the Roman Catholic Diocese of Iba. The parishes are:

- St. Joseph Parish (1920) in Barangay East Bajac-Bajac
- St. Columban Parish (1963) in Barangay New Asinan
- Santa Rita Parish (1967) in Barangay Santa Rita
- Holy Trinity Parish (1975) in Barangay New Cabalan
- St. Anne Parish (1985) in Brgy Gordon Heights
- Immaculate Conception Parish (1986) in Barangay Barretto
- San Lorenzo Ruiz Parish (1991) in Barangay New Kalalake
- Holy Family Parish (1992) in Barangay Kalaklan
- St. Vincent de Paul Quasi-Parish in Barangay Old Cabalan
- San Roque Quasi-Parish in the Subic Bay Freeport Zone.

== Government ==
=== Local government ===
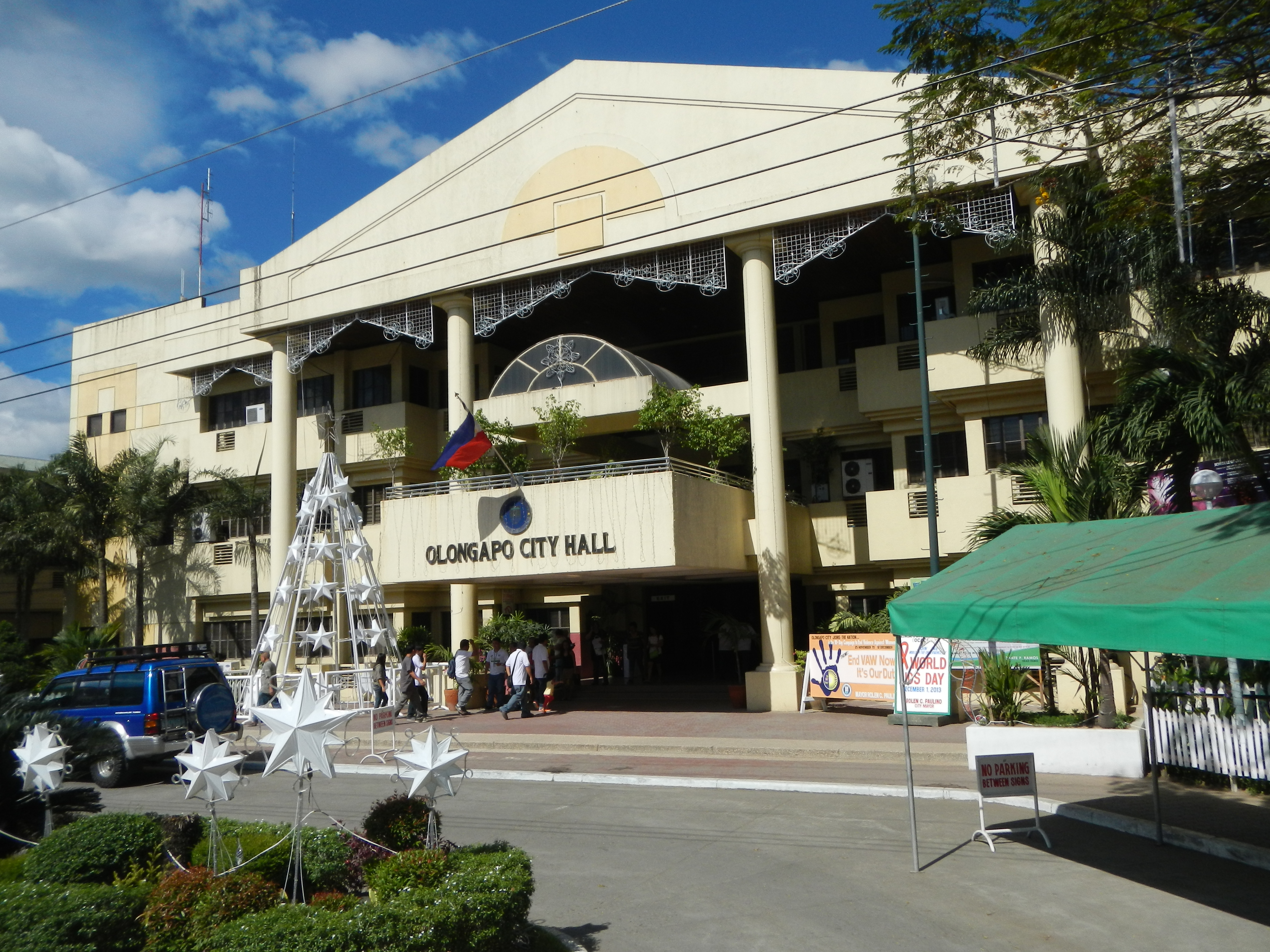
Olongapo City Hall

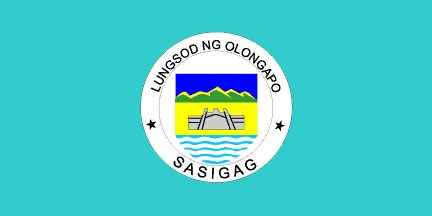
Former flag of the city

Seal of the city, NHCP version

As highly urbanized city in the province of Zambales, only the city government officials are voted by the electorates of the city. The provincial government has no political jurisdiction over local transactions of the city government. Residents of this city are not allowed to run in the provincial level except for congress representation which the city of Olongapo forms part of Zambales's 1st congressional district.

The city of Olongapo is governed by a city mayor designated as its local chief executive, and by a city council as its legislative body, in accordance with the local government code. Both the mayor and the ten city councilors are elected directly by the people through an election which is being held every three years.

Barangays are also headed by elected officials: barangay captain, and barangay council, whose members are called barangay councilors. The barangays have SK federation which represents the barangay, headed by SK chairperson and whose members are called SK councilors. All officials are also elected every three years.

=== Mayors ===
The following is the list of all mayors who led Olongapo after World War II:

Name	Term	Position
Ruben Geronimo	November 1959 – 1962	Municipal mayor
Ildefonso Arriola	1962 – 1964	Municipal mayor
James Gordon	January 1, 1964 – June 1, 1966	Municipal mayor
James Gordon	June 1, 1966 – February 20, 1967	City mayor
Jaime Guevarra	February 20, 1967 – 1968	City mayor
Amelia (née Juico) Gordon	January 1, 1968 – June 30, 1972	City mayor
Geronimo Lipumano	July 1972 – May 1980	City mayor
Richard Gordon	June 30, 1980 – April 23, 1986	City mayor (1st term)
Teodoro Macapagal	March 1986 – November 1987	OIC mayor
Teodoro Macapagal	November 1987 – January 1988	OIC mayor
Richard Gordon	February 2, 1988 – July 23, 1993	City mayor (2nd term)
Cynthia Cajudo	July 23, 1993 – March 21, 1995	City mayor
Rexy Gregorio Cruz	March 22, 1995 – June 30, 1995	City mayor (acting)
Katherine Gordon	June 30, 1995 – June 30, 2004	City mayor
James Gordon, Jr.	June 30, 2004 – June 30, 2013	City mayor
Rolen Calixto Paulino Sr.	June 30, 2013 – September 3, 2018	City mayor
Lugie Lipumano-Garcia	September 3, 2018 – March 3, 2019	OIC mayor
Rolen Calixto Paulino Sr.	March 3, 2019 – June 30, 2019	City mayor
Rolen Co Paulino Jr.	June 30, 2019 – present	City mayor

=== Congressional representation ===
Olongapo, belongs to the 1st District of Zambales.

=== Public safety ===
==== Fire and rescue service ====
The City Disaster Risk Reduction and Management Office (known as Olongapo City DRRMO) is a government agency which includes city and national government groups such as National Disaster Risk Reduction and Management Council (NDRRMC), Department of National Defense (DND), and Department of the Interior and Local Government (DILG). This agency has a well trained rescue service, its own fire and rescue equipment, and emergency response service for any kind of disasters. It has a capability that they adopt from the American servicemen from the former US naval base. The DRRMO are separated from Olongapo City Fire Station (OCFS) under the Bureau of Fire Protection (DILG-BFP) with the same capability as other fire services.

The city has its own Barangay Fire Services used as a first responder in their respective communities. Another fire and rescue service was from the nearest Subic Bay Freeport Zone under its own fire department controlled by Subic Bay Metropolitan Authority with trained personnel and rescue equipment abandoned by the Americans similar to DRRMO. The Philippines' oldest fire truck made by Americans responded to notable disasters such as the 1991 eruption of Mount Pinatubo, the Fukushima disaster cleanup in 2011 and Typhoon Haiyan search and rescue operations in 2013.

==== Crime and law enforcement ====
The city has six different police stations under control by Olongapo City Police Office (OCPO) and was umbrella to Philippine National Police (PNP). The city police main garrison was on Camp Cabal (also known in locals as "164") at Barangay Barretto. Additional policy implementation agency is controlled by the Subic Bay Metropolitan Authority - Law Enforcement Department (SBMA-LED) which secures the coastal waters of Subic Bay and its nearby Freeport Zone under Republic Act 7227 (known as "SBMA Police").

Contrary to traffic enforcement, the city has separate law enforcement which is the Office of the Traffic Management and Public Safety (OTMPS). The office focuses on implementation of color coded transport scheme, security of government-owned establishment, organizing public market, and providing traffic enforcement safety which was mandated parallel and coordinated to Land Transportation Office.

== Infrastructure ==
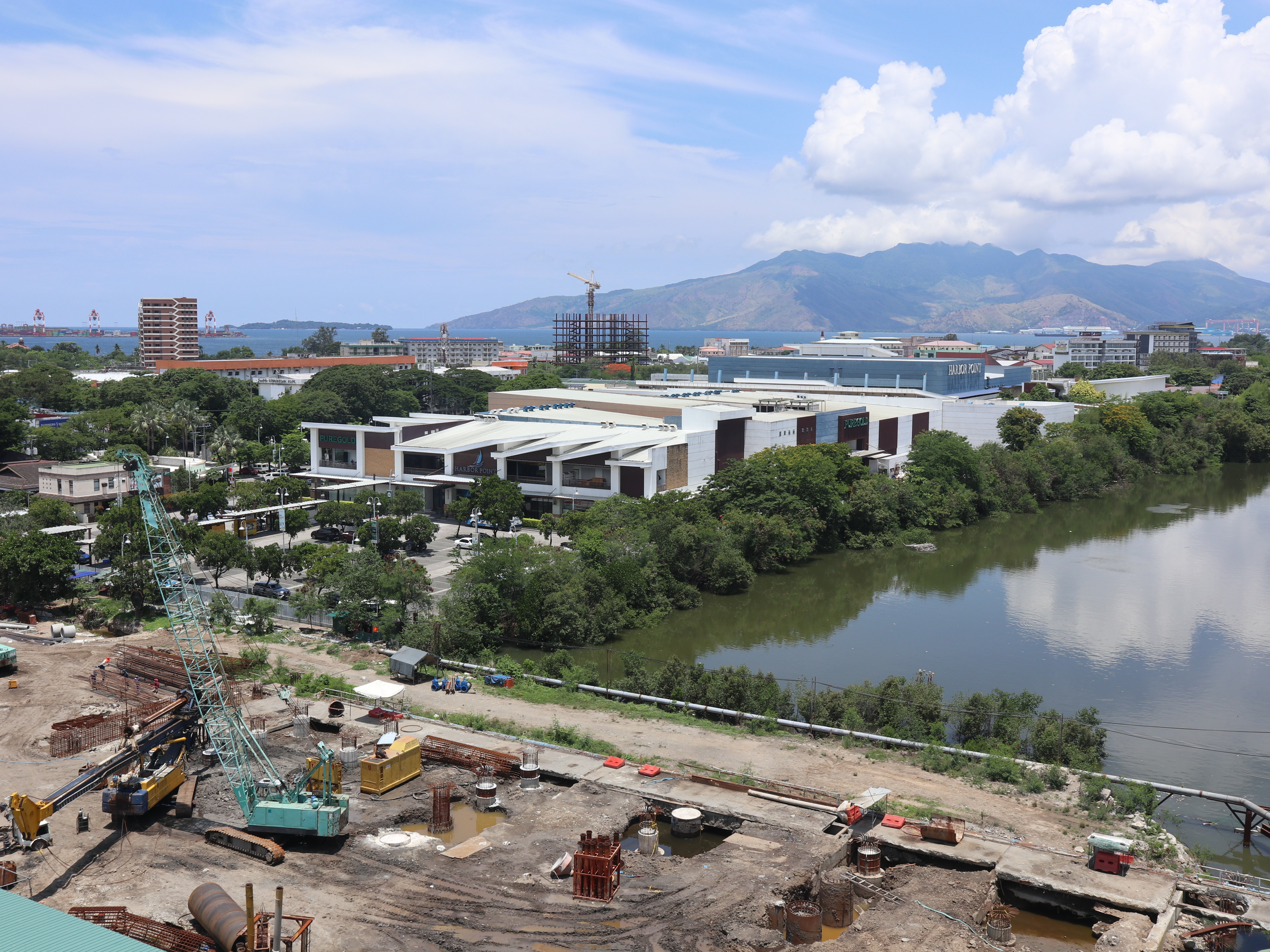
Harbor Point at the Olongapo portion of the Subic Bay Freeport

=== Transportation ===
==== Airport ====
There are no airports in Olongapo itself, although Subic Bay International Airport in the adjacent town of Morong, Bataan serves the general area of Olongapo. The airport is within the Subic Bay Freeport Zone and was formerly known as Naval Air Station Cubi Point, when it was still an airbase of the United States.

==== Sea port ====
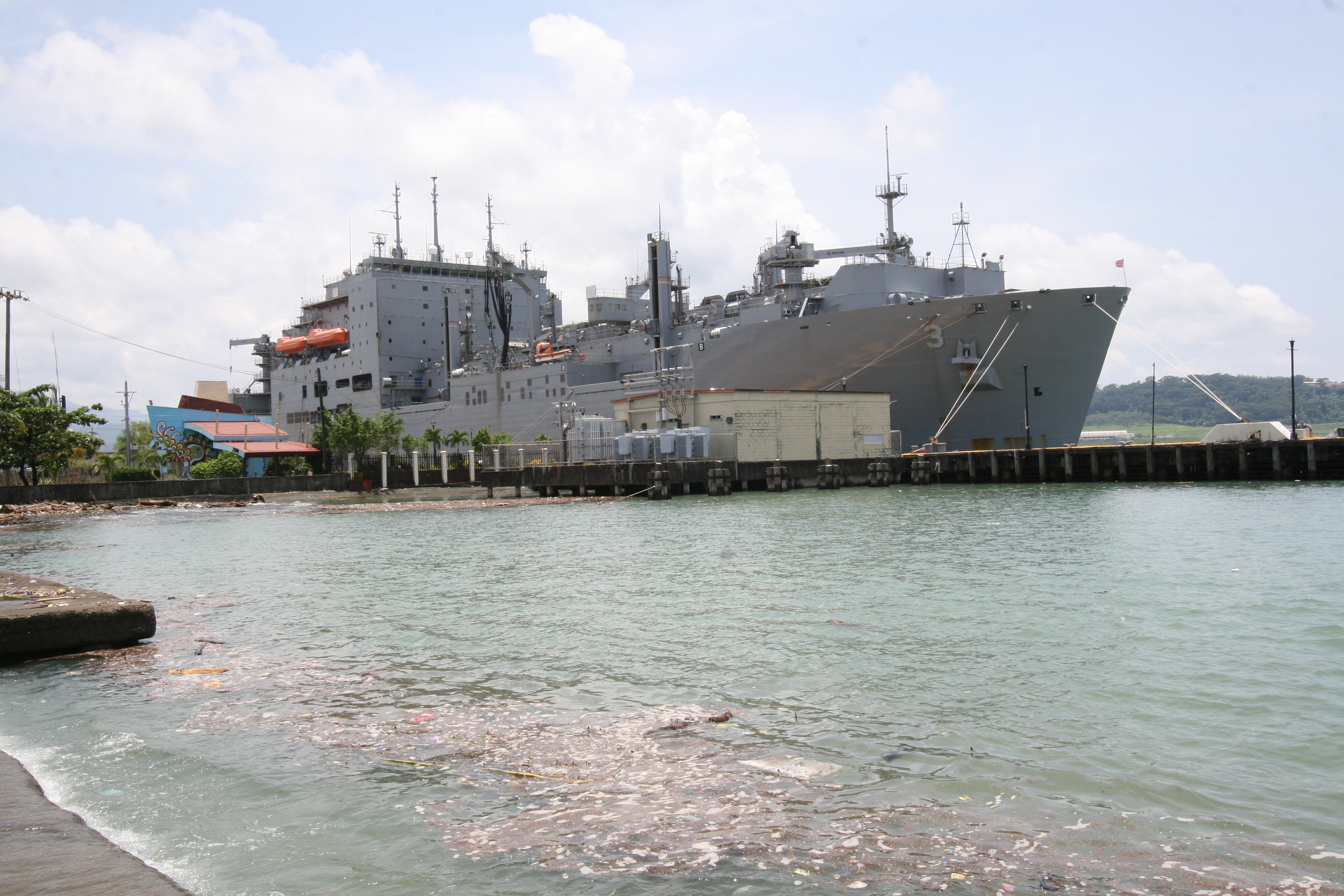
Ship docked at Alava Wharf, Port of Subic Bay, Olongapo

Olongapo is served by the Port of Subic Bay, operated and managed by the Subic Bay Metropolitan Authority. Some facilities of the seaport are located on the Olongapo portion of the Subic Freeport Zone namely the Alava, Bravo, and Rivera Wharves.

==== Roads ====
The city has an organized road network, featuring a series of rectangular street grids. The primary road that connects Olongapo to the rest of the other is Jose Abad Santos Avenue. In the city's main district, the names of those streets running from north to south follow the English alphabet's order. Streets running east to west are numbered from 1st to 27th, starting from the south parallel and up. Even-numbered streets are on the east side of the city, while odd streets are on the west. Most of the roads in Olongapo are made of concrete and asphalt.

==== Public transportation ====
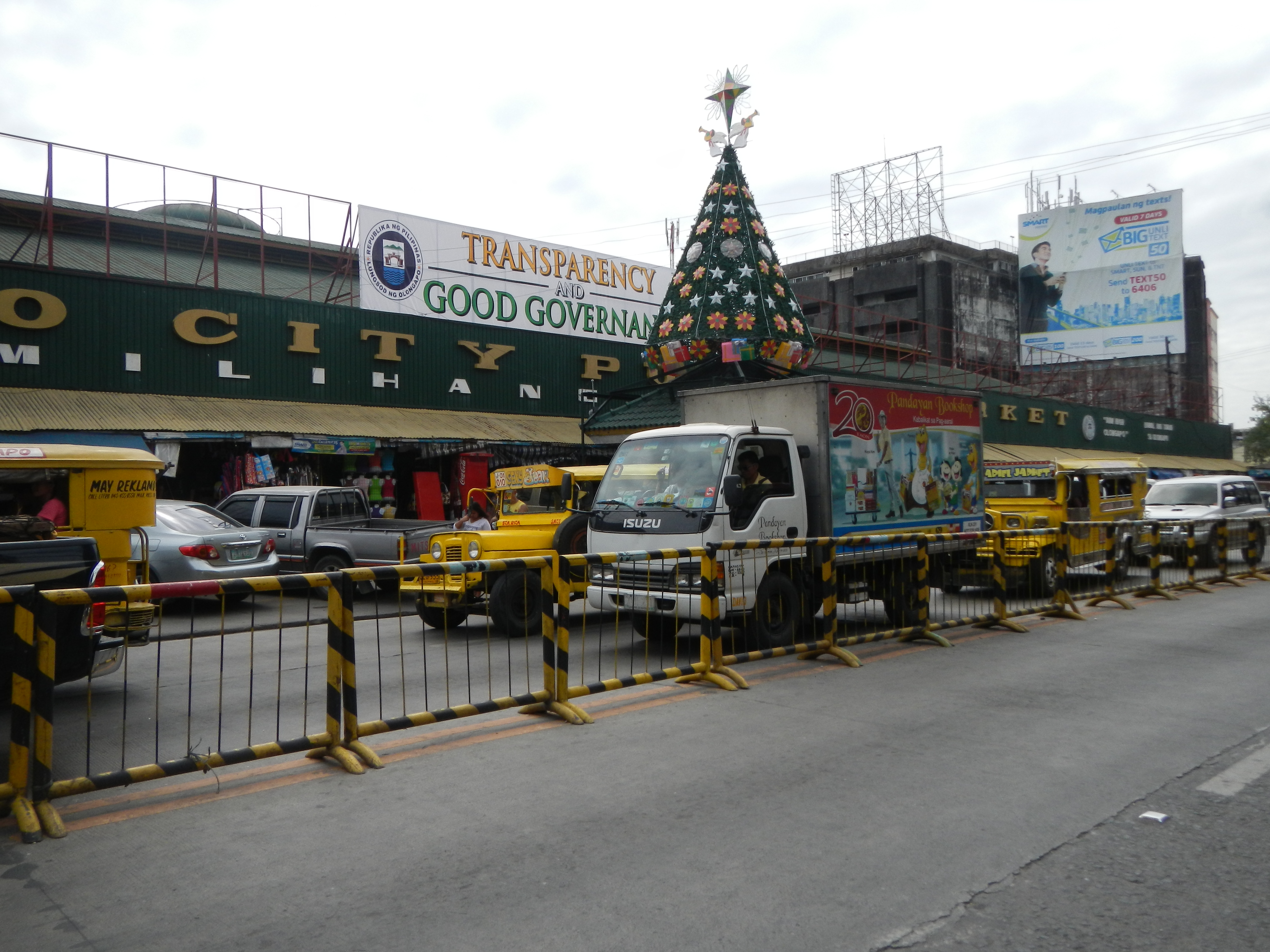
Vehicles including public jeepneys along Rizal Avenue in front of the public market

The city boasts its color-coded public transportation system which it has pioneered in the country. All public utility jeepneys and tricycles have their own color code depending on the district, zone or route that they serve. Taxi services are also operated in the city but are limited.

==== Bus ====
Victory Liner and Saulog Transit are the leading bus operators, and have their own terminals in the city. They transport people in and out of the city. Local bus terminals are also present, and are primarily used for transportation in neighboring towns and inside the Subic Bay Freeport Zone.

===== Roads =====
Olongapo is accessible through the National Highway (via Zigzag Road) from Hermosa and Dinalupihan, Bataan. The National Highway cuts through the city center and goes through north up to Barangay Barreto and then on to the neighboring town of Subic, and the rest of the towns in Zambales up to Pangasinan province. Another access to the city is via SCTEX and Subic Freeport Expressway exiting to the gates of Subic Bay Freeport Zone and also, from the south, Morong, Bataan (via Balanga, Bataan) through the Morong gate of Subic Bay Freeport Zone.

=== Public utilities ===
==== Electricity ====
Electricity services were formerly provided by the government-run Public Utilities Department (PUD) since the city was founded. However, in the late 2000s, the city faced debt in its electricity distribution costs amounting to P5 billion to power suppliers and threatened to cut the city from the Luzon power grid. Then Mayor James Gordon Jr. also attributed the crisis to low collection rate due to nonpayment or debts incurred by consumers, widespread energy theft and corruption in the PUD. The situation worsened because of interests imposed by Private Sector Assets and Liabilities Management Corp. (PSALM), the refusal of the Energy Regulatory Commission (ERC) to grant an increase in power rates, and the years of delay in the PUD's privatization.

In 2013, through Republic Act No. 10373, the PUD was sold for Php 610 million to Olongapo Electricity Distribution Company (OEDC), an affiliate of Cagayan Electric Power and Light Company (CEPALCO), which was given a 25-year franchise to take over the city's power distributor. The company has since upgraded the city's obsolete and dilapidated distribution network and has made significant improvements to the city's electricity services.

==== Water ====
Water services are provided by Subic Water and Sewerage Company (also known as Subic Water. Not to be confused with Subic Water District (SWD), which is a different water distribution company serving the neighboring towns of Subic, Zambales.). In 2013, the city's shares in Subic Water has been sold to Maynilad Water Services Inc. (Maynilad) to continue modernizing the city's water utilities services. In March 2016, this was reversed and the city has bought back its shares because the city wanted to have a representation in Subic Water because the city's constituents accounted for the majority of Subic Water's customers.

== Environment ==
Olongapo is home to a number of important Philippine species, including the endangered Philippine hawk-eagle (Nisaetus philippensis) and the Olive ridley sea turtle (Lepidochelys olivacea).

== Education ==
The city of Olongapo has several high schools, including Barretto National High School on Rizal Street in barangay Barretto.

== Notable people ==
- Freddie Aguilar (1953-2025), musician, singer-songwriter
- Allmo$t, Filipino hip hop group
- Rico Barrera (b. 1981), model and actor of ABS-CBN, Pinoy Big Brother season 1 housemate
- Blakdyak (Joseph Amoto-Formaran) (1969–2016), singer, comedian and actor
- K Brosas (b. 1975), comedian, singer and host
- Mike Corgan (1918–1989), American football player
- Eric Cray (b. 1988), track and field athlete, Olympian at the 2016 Summer Olympics
- Wowie de Guzman (b. 1976), actor of ABS-CBN
- Gigi de Lana (b. 1995), singer and actress
- Angelu de Leon (b. 1979), actress of GMA Network
- Moira Dela Torre (b. 1993), singer-songwriter of ABS-CBN
- Angelee delos Reyes (b. 1987), Miss Philippines Earth 2013
- Richard J. Gordon (b. 1945), politician and chairman of Philippine Red Cross
- Simon Ibarra (b. 1960), actor, and model
- Liezel Lopez (b. 1997), actress, model and StarStruck contestant
- Kristofer Martin (b. 1994), actor of GMA Network
- Raikko Mateo (b. 2008), child actor of ABS-CBN, who took the titular role in Honesto
- Ez Mil (b. 1998), rapper and songwriter
- Willie Miller (b. 1977), basketball player
- Samuel Morrison (b. 1991), athletic taekwondo, he won the gold medalist on seagames 2019
- Arnel Pineda (b. 1967), singer/lead vocalist of Journey
- Melissa Ricks (b. 1990), actress and host
- Topex Robinson (b. 1974), former head coach of Phoenix Fuel Super LPG Masters
- Tom Rodriguez (b. 1987), actor and model
- Jake Vargas (b. 1992), model and actor of GMA Network
- Lauren Young (b. 1993), actress of GMA Network
- Megan Young (b. 1990), actress and host of GMA Network, Miss World Philippines 2013 and Miss World 2013

== Sister cities ==
Olongapo has the following sister cities:

- Cabanatuan, Philippines
- Bremerton, Washington, United States
- National City, California, United States
- Virginia Beach, Virginia, United States
