= Mount Repose =

Mount Repose may refer to:

- Mount Repose (Natchez, Mississippi)
- Mount Repose, Ohio

== See also ==
- Montrepose Cemetery in Kingston, New York
