= USS Repose =

USS Repose has been the name of more than one United States Navy ship, and may refer to:

- USS Relief (1896), a hospital ship in commission from 1902 to 1910 and sold in 1919, renamed USS Repose in 1918 while out of commission
- USS Repose (AH-16), a hospital ship in commission from May 1945 to January 1950, from October 1950 to December 1954, and from October 1965 to May 1970
