= Teddy Baguilat =

Filipino politician and indigenous activist (born 1966)

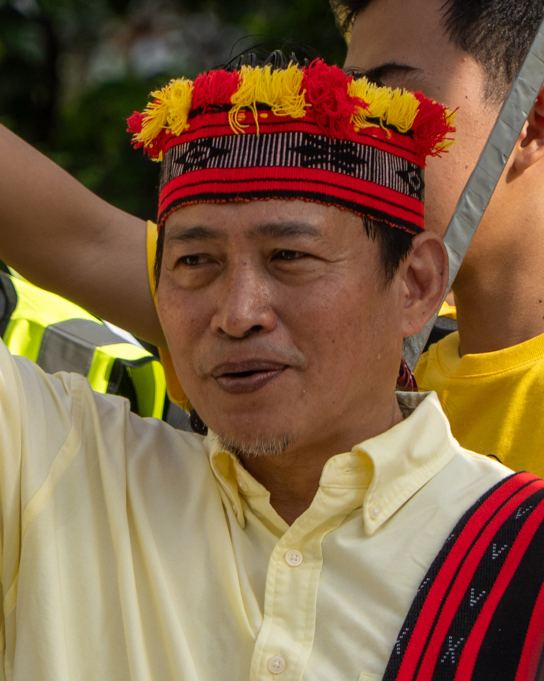
- Baguilat in 2026

Member of the Philippine House of Representatives from Ifugao's Lone District
- In office June 30, 2010 – June 30, 2019
- Preceded by: Solomon Chungalao
- Succeeded by: Solomon Chungalao

8th Governor of Ifugao
- In office June 30, 2007 – June 30, 2010
- Vice Governor: Nora Dinamling
- Preceded by: Glenn Prudenciano
- Succeeded by: Eugene Balitang
- In office June 30, 2001 – June 30, 2004
- Vice Governor: Bella Takinan
- Preceded by: Ildefonso Dulinayan
- Succeeded by: Benjamin Cappleman

Mayor of Kiangan
- In office June 30, 1995 – June 30, 2001

Member of the Sangguniang Bayan of Kiangan
- In office June 30, 1992 – June 30, 1995

Secretary General of the Liberal Party
- In office September 30, 2022 – January 24, 2026
- Preceded by: Christopher "Kit" Belmonte
- Succeeded by: Kit Belmonte

Personal details
- Born: Teodoro Brawner Baguilat Jr. July 30, 1966 (age 60) Manila, Philippines
- Party: Liberal (2006–present); ML (party-list; 2024–present)
- Other political affiliations: Lakas (2003–2006); Independent (until 2003)
- Relations: Romeo Brawner Sr. (uncle); Felix Brawner Jr. (uncle); Romeo Brawner Jr. (cousin); Ice Baguilat (cousin)
- Education: University of the Philippines Diliman (BA)
- Occupation: Consultant, journalist, activist

Teodoro "Teddy" Brawner Baguilat Jr. (born July 30, 1966) is a Filipino politician and journalist, activist and advocate of indigenous peoples' rights and the rights of minority groups.

Baguilat is a member of both the Tuwali indigenous tribe in Ifugao and the Gaddang indigenous tribe of Nueva Vizcaya. He is the president of the Global Consortium for Indigenous and Community Conserved Areas (ICCA Consortium), an advisory body to the United Nations Convention on Biological Diversity. He is also the vice president for internal affairs of the Liberal Party.

== Early life and education ==
Teodoro Brawner Baguilat Jr. was born in Manila on July 30, 1966, to Teodoro Baguilat Sr., a retired official of the Department of Agriculture and resident of Kiangan, Ifugao, and Felisa Brawner, a lawyer and resident of Solano, Nueva Vizcaya. At the age of 13, Baguilat returned to Kiangan where he studied at the Saint Joseph School Kiangan for his secondary education. He then pursued his Bachelor of Arts in Mass Communication, Major in Journalism at the University of the Philippines Diliman and became an active student leader on campus.

== Career ==
=== Early career ===
From 1987 to 1991, Baguilat worked at the Department of Environment and Natural Resources as an executive assistant to an undersecretary. He also worked as a production assistant for GMA Channel 7, as a reporter for the People’s News Service, and as an executive assistant for the Philippine Ecological Network. In 1991, he returned to Ifugao to establish a foundation that aimed to help students and protect the local environment.

In 1992, Baguilat ran for the municipal council of Kiangan. He would at the time become the youngest councilor in the Philippines at the age of 25. From 1995 to 2001, Baguilat served as mayor of Kiangan. In 1996, Baguilat received the Dangal ng Bayan Award and recognition as one of the Ten Most Outstanding Civil Servants of the Philippines awarded by then-president Fidel V. Ramos.

=== Governor of Ifugao (2001–2010) ===
Baguilat ran for the governorship of Ifugao in the 2001 election and won under the banner of the Liberal Party. Baguilat narrowly lost in a re-election bid in the 2004 election. He afterwards served as the president of the Save the Ifugao Rice Terraces Movement, a non-government organization that seeks to promote and protect the cultural treasures of Ifugao and its indigenous people. Baguilat ran again in the 2007 election and was elected anew as Ifugao's governor.

In 2009, the Ifugao Provincial Board filed a case against Baguilat through the Ombudsman of the Philippines for "grave misconduct and gross neglect of duty" after failing to notify the board of his travels to several countries. The Ombudsman ruled Baguilat guilty and imposed a fine equivalent to a one-year salary. In 2015, the Court of Appeals reversed the Ombudsman ruling and cleared Baguilat of all charges.

=== Representative of Ifugao (2010–2019) ===
Baguilat won in the 2010 election as the representative of the lone district of Ifugao. As representative, Baguilat continued to campaign for the preservation of the Rice Terraces of the Philippine Cordilleras, which was officially removed from the list of endangered world heritage sites in 2012. Baguilat would again win in the 2013 general election as Ifugao representative.

In the 2016 election, Baguilat won a third and final term as Ifugao representative. He ran for speakership of the 17th Congress but lost to Pantaleon Alvarez. He was then chosen as the leader of the minority bloc via tradition of voting on the speakership. Baguilat was the first person from an indigenous community to be elected for the position. However, a few days after, he was booted from the position after more than 20 lawmakers from the majority shifted to the minority to take control of the bloc, therefore, voting Baguilat's ouster from minority leadership and replacing him with a pro-majority lawmaker, thus forming a supermajority in the House of Representatives.

As representative, Baguilat is a proponent of human rights and a vocal critic of President Rodrigo Duterte, particularly the controversial war on drugs. In 2016, Baguilat protested against the proposed House probe of senator Leila de Lima, which he claimed was tantamount to a "witch hunt." Baguilat condemned the burial of Ferdinand Marcos at the Libingan ng mga Bayani, and filed for a temporary restraining order from the Supreme Court to halt the burial. In 2017, Baguilat has voted against the re-imposition of the death penalty, and opposed the drastic reduction of the Commission on Human Rights budget to just ₱1,000. He also sought to prioritize the investigation of alleged extrajudicial killings committed by state forces.

Baguilat is the principal author of the Philippine Indigenous and Community Conserved Area Bill. He has also filed and supported several bills that focus on indigenous rights, such as the Cordillera Organic Law, the Chico River Basin Bill, the Indigenous Education Bill, and the Indigenous Barangay Bill.

Other bills Baguilat has authored or supported include the Reproductive Health Bill, the Freedom of Information Bill, the SOGIE Equality Bill, the Universal Access to Quality Tertiary Education Act, the Higher Teacher's Pay Bill, the Divorce Bill, the National Land Use Act, the Free Wifi Law, the Department of Fisheries Bill, Philippine Mental Health Law, Expanded Maternity Leave Bill and the Philippine HIV and AIDS Policy Act.

On February 9, 2018, the Ombudsman filed graft charges against Baguilat for the overpriced purchase of a secondhand vehicle in 2003, during his first term as Ifugao governor, and ordered his dismissal from government service. The Sandiganbayan ruled in favor of Baguilat on August 21, 2018, after government prosecutors failed to file the necessary petitions. On January 2, 2019, the Court of Appeals cleared Baguilat of all charges.

Baguilat again ran for governor of Ifugao province in the 2019 election, but lost to Banaue mayor Jerry Dalipog.

=== 2022 Senate bid ===
On October 8, 2021, Baguilat filed his candidacy for senator in the 2022 senatorial election running under Vice President Leni Robredo's senatorial ticket. Baguilat lost after placing 28th in the final results and garnering over 4.2 million votes.

=== 2025 party-list bid ===
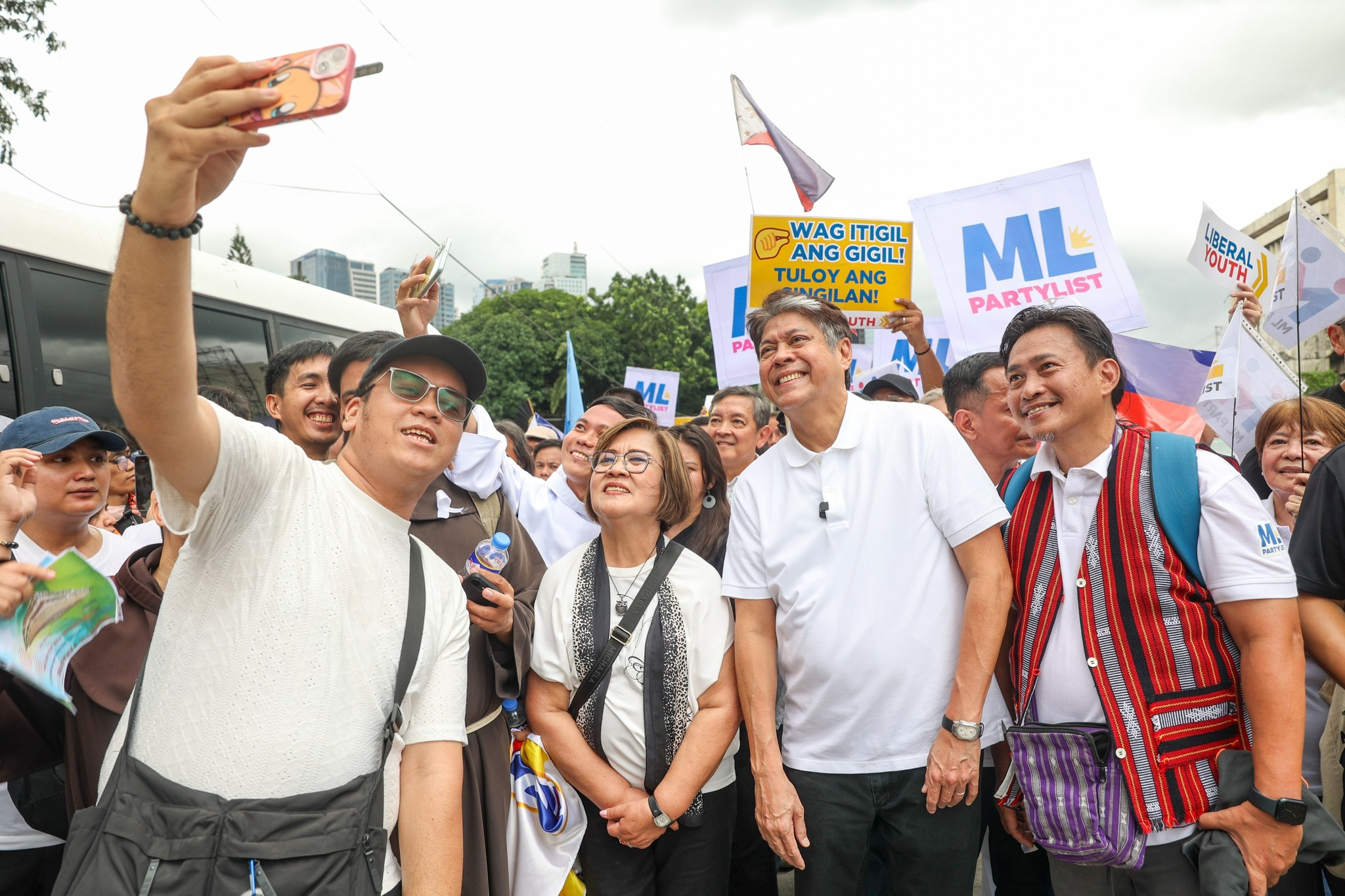
Banguilat with Leila de Lima and Kiko Pangilinan during the Trillion Peso March

Baguilat was named as the president and the second nominee of Mamamayang Liberal party-list, which filed candidacy for the 2025 elections. However, the party-list only secured one seat for the 20th Congress, to be occupied by its first nominee, former Senator Leila de Lima.

== Electoral history ==
Electoral history of Teddy Baguilat
Year	Office	Party	Votes received				Result
Year	Office	Party	Total	%	P.	Swing	Result
2001	Governor of Ifugao	Independent	21,035	34.71%	1st	—N/a	Won
2004	Governor of Ifugao	Lakas–NUCD	26,760	38.58%	2nd	+3.87	Lost
2007	Governor of Ifugao	Liberal	24,506	35.47%	1st	-3.11	Won
2019	Governor of Ifugao	Liberal	30,803	32.47%	2nd	-3.00	Lost
2010	Representative (Ifugao-at-large)	Liberal	22,314	28.88%	1st	—N/a	Won
2013	Representative (Ifugao-at-large)	Liberal	43,751	51.27%	1st	+22.39	Won
2016	Representative (Ifugao-at-large)	Liberal	48,719	55.80%	1st	+4.53	Won
2025	Representative (Party-list)	ML	547,949	1.31%	14th	—N/a	Won one out of three seats
2022	Senator of the Philippines	Liberal	4,275,873	7.70%	28th	—N/a	Lost

Party political offices
Preceded by Jose Christopher Y. Belmonte	Secretary General of the Liberal Party; 2022–2026	Succeeded by Kit Belmonte
