= Felix Brawner Jr. =

Filipino military official (1934–2022)

Felix A. Brawner Jr.
- Born: July 4, 1934; Solano, Nueva Vizcaya, Philippine Islands
- Died: November 16, 2022 (aged 88); Philippines
- Relatives: Romeo Brawner Sr. (brother); Romeo Brawner Jr. (nephew); Teddy Baguilat (nephew)
- Military career
- Allegiance: Republic of the Philippines
- Branch: Philippine Army
- Service years: 1957–1988
- Rank: Brigadier General
- Unit: 1st Scout Ranger Regiment
- Commands: Armed Forces of the Philippines

Brig. Gen. Felix Aliac Brawner Jr. (July 4, 1934 – November 16, 2022) was the commander of the First Scout Ranger Regiment of the Philippine Army during the final years of the Marcos dictatorship. Brawner graduate from the Philippine Military Academy in 1957 at the top of his class. He is also known for going to Marawi during the peak of rebellion of the Muslims in Mindanao in the 1970s to initiate good ties with the Muslims. He retired from the military service in 1988.

Brawner died on November 16, 2022, at the age of 88. He was the brother of former Court of Appeals Presiding Justice and former COMELEC Chairman, the late Romeo A. Brawner. His nephew is Gen. Romeo S Brawner Jr, is the 60th Chief of Staff of the Armed Forces of the Philippines, from 2023 to 2026.
