= Resurreccion Borra =

Filipino public servant (1935–2020)

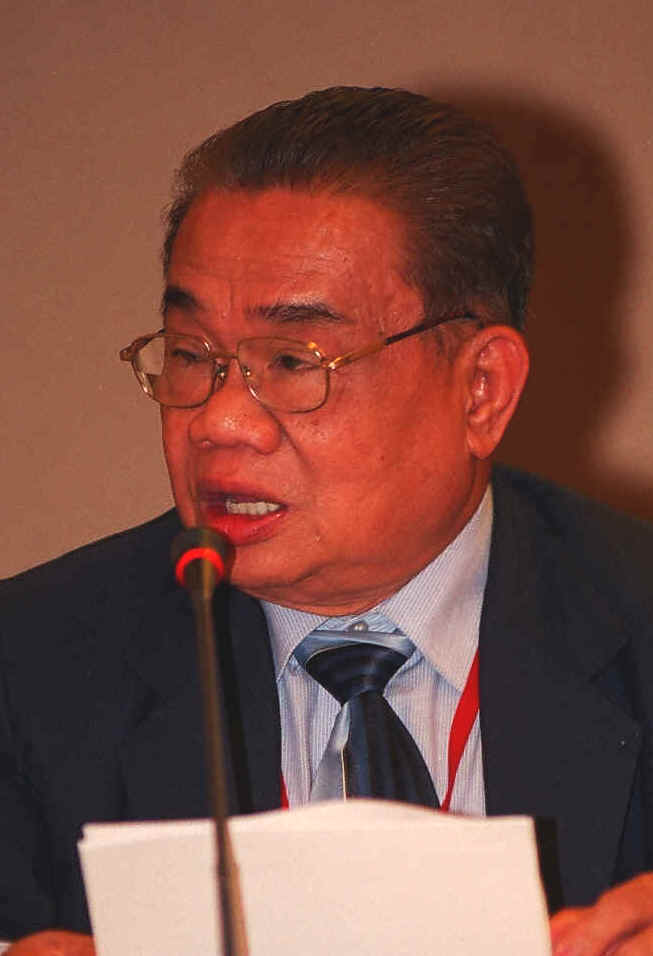

Chairman of the Commission on Elections
- Acting
- In office October 2, 2007 – February 2, 2008
- Appointed by: Gloria Macapagal Arroyo
- Preceded by: Benjamin Abalos
- Succeeded by: Romeo A. Brawner

COMELEC Commissioner
- In office February 16, 2001 – February 2, 2008
- Appointed by: Gloria Macapagal Arroyo

Personal details
- Born: October 20, 1935 Janiuay, Iloilo, Philippine Islands
- Died: August 1, 2020 (aged 84) Manila, Philippines

Resurreccion Borra (October 20, 1935 – August 1, 2020) was a Filipino public servant who was a Career Executive Service Officer (CESO), a former commissioner and was the acting chair of the Philippine Commission on Elections. He was the most senior Commissioner of COMELEC who has served the agency for over 44 years. He replaced Benjamin Abalos upon the latter's resignation.

== Members of the Borra Commission ==
Assumed office: October 2, 2007 Dissolved: February 2, 2008

#	Name	Position
1	Resureccion Z. Borra	Acting Chairman/Commissioner
2	Florentino A. Tuason, Jr.	Commissioner
3	Romeo A. Brawner	Commissioner
4	Rene V. Sarmiento	Commissioner
5	Nicodemo T. Ferrer	Commissioner
6	Moslemen T. Macarambon Sr.	Commissioner

== Retirement ==
Borra retired effective February 2, 2008. He was replaced by Romeo A. Brawner as an acting chair of the COMELEC.

== See also ==
- Commission on Elections (Philippines)

Preceded by Benjamin Abalos	COMELEC Chairman; October 2007– February 2, 2008	Succeeded by Romeo A. Brawner (Acting)
