= Sixto Brillantes Jr. =

Filipino election lawyer (1939–2020)

Sixto Brillantes
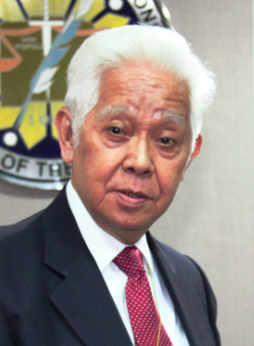
- Brillantes in 2014

Chairman of the Commission on Elections
- In office January 16, 2011 – February 2, 2015
- Appointed by: Benigno Aquino III
- Preceded by: Jose Melo
- Succeeded by: Christian Robert Lim (OIC) Andres Bautista

Personal details
- Born: Sixto Serrano Brillantes Jr. August 14, 1939 Santa, Ilocos Sur, Philippine Commonwealth
- Died: August 11, 2020 (aged 80) Manila, Philippines
- Cause of death: COVID-19
- Spouse: Francisca Verde-Brillantes
- Children: 3
- Education: San Beda University

Sixto Serrano Brillantes Jr. (Tagalog pronunciation: [ˈsiks.to sɛˈɾano brɪlˈjantɛs], August 14, 1939 – August 11, 2020) was a Filipino election lawyer who was the chairman of the Commission on Elections from 2011 to 2015. He was appointed by President Benigno Aquino III on January 16, 2011, to serve the unexpired term of Chairman Jose Melo.

== Early life and education ==
Brillantes was born in Santa, Ilocos Sur on August 14, 1939, to Sixto P. Brillantes Sr., a former Governor and assemblyman of Ilocos Sur, and Azucena Serrano. He has four siblings including former Labor Secretary and Ambassador to Canada Jose Brillantes.

He studied at Saint Theresa's College of San Marcelino, Manila, and Ateneo de Manila University for grade school and then San Beda College for high-school and college, graduating with a Bachelor of Science in Commerce degree in 1960 and a Bachelor of Laws degree in 1965. While a law student, Brillantes was president of the San Beda College of Law Supreme Law Council and editor-in-chief of the San Beda College of Law Journal. He passed the CPA examinations in 1960 and then placed seventh in the 1965 bar examinations.

== Career ==
In 1966, Brillantes worked at the Court of Appeals as a legal researcher. From 1967 to 1972, he was a junior partner at the Brillantes Law Office. After that, he was AVP/Legal Affairs Officer of Northern Cement Corporation, a company owned by Eduardo Cojuangco, for 10 years from 1972 to 1982. From 1983 to 1986, he worked at various offices including the then-Ministry of Labor as a legal consultant. He was also a director, corporate secretary and legal counsel of the Eduardo Cojuangco Jr. Group of Companies for various years. He then became a senior partner of several law offices starting in 1983 but specialized in election law only in 1985.

From 2001 to 2006, he was the general counsel of the Nationalist People's Coalition, a political party founded by Cojuangco. He then was a legal consultant of United Opposition, a party founded by Jejomar Binay, from 2007 to 2009. He also helped in the campaigns of Cojuangco during the 1992 presidential election, Joseph Estrada during the 1998 presidential election, Fernando Poe Jr. during the 2004 presidential election and Benigno Aquino III during the 2010 presidential election.

Brillantes was also a college professor. He taught general and election law at San Beda, Arellano Law Foundation, and Perpetual Help College, as well as accounting at the Philippine School of Business Administration and St. Theresa's College.

=== COMELEC Chairman ===
Brillantes was appointed by President Aquino, his client, as chairman of the COMELEC on January 16, 2011. He resigned as an election lawyer following his appointment and said: “Marami ang nakakakilala sa akin, and for the last 20 years, ako ho ang humahabol sa mga operator. (People already know me, and for the last 20 years, I'm the one chasing the cheaters)”. Some quarters had criticized Brillantes fearing that he may not be an objective COMELEC chief, having served popular clients such as former President Joseph Estrada and the Ampatuan family. Even former Senator and Aquino ally Mar Roxas supposedly expressed reservations over his appointment. He allegedly voiced his fears to President Aquino that Brillantes may favor Senator Francis Escudero or Vice-President Jejomar Binay in the 2016 elections.

The Commission on Appointments confirmed the appointment of Brillantes only in October 2011 after extensive confirmation hearings and several deferments. During this time, COMELEC's legal department chief accused him of corruption while Senator Alan Peter Cayetano was vetoing his confirmation.

Brillantes oversaw the handling of the 2013 midterm election.

== Personal life and death ==
Brillantes married Francisca Verde, a nutritionist-dietician, in 1970 and had three children.

In 2000, he was awarded as one of the Bedans of the Century by San Beda College. In 2009, he was recognized as an Outstanding Bedan Lawyer by the San Beda Law Alumni Association. He was inducted to the San Beda College Alumni Association Hall of Fame the following year.

On July 25, 2020, Brillantes' daughter Zeena Brillantes and a former staff member separately disclosed that he tested positive for COVID-19 amid the COVID-19 pandemic in the Philippines. Prior to this, he was confined at the Medical Center Manila on July 18, and was intubated on July 25. He died on August 11, 2020, three days before his 81st birthday.

Government offices
Preceded by Jose Melo	COMELEC Chairman; 2011–2015	Succeeded by Andres Bautista
