= Jose Melo =

Filipino lawyer and jurist (1932–2020)

The Honorable Jose Melo
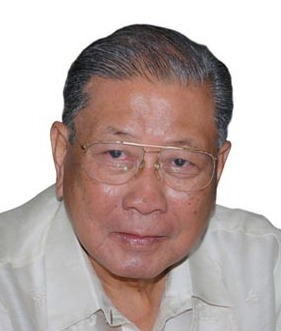
- Melo circa 2009

Chairman of the Commission on Elections
- In office March 25, 2008 – January 17, 2011
- Appointed by: Gloria Macapagal Arroyo
- Preceded by: Romeo A. Brawner
- Succeeded by: Sixto Brillantes

128th Associate Justice of the Supreme Court of the Philippines
- In office August 10, 1992 – May 30, 2002
- Appointed by: Fidel Ramos
- Preceded by: Ameurfina Melencio-Herrera
- Succeeded by: Conchita Carpio-Morales

Personal details
- Born: May 30, 1932 Manila, Philippine Islands
- Died: October 18, 2020 (aged 88) Makati, Philippines
- Spouse: Norma Cruz Melo

Jose Armando R. Melo (May 30, 1932 – October 18, 2020) was a Filipino lawyer and jurist who served as an Associate Justice of the Supreme Court of the Philippines from 1992 to 2002. He also served as Chairman of the Commission on Elections (COMELEC), and was succeeded by election lawyer Sixto Brillantes.

== Early life and education ==
Melo was born in the Philippine General Hospital in Manila but spent most of his childhood in Angeles City.

He graduated from Sta. Ana Elementary School in 1946 and from Victorino Mapa High School in 1950. He attended Manuel L. Quezon University for his undergraduate studies and was the business manager and editor of the M.L.Q. Law Quarterly. In 1956, he finished his Bachelor of Laws from Manuel L. Quezon University, and later that year passed the bar examinations with a rating of 85.5%. He obtained his Master of Laws at the University of Santo Tomas in 1960 with the highest grade of meritissimus.

== Career ==
Melo began his law practice as a staff member of the Diokno Law Office, the law firm of renowned Senator José W. "Ka Pepe" Diokno, from 1957 to 1962. From 1962 to 1971, he was a member of the staff of the Office of the President, rising from Executive Assistant to Junior Presidential Staff Assistant. From 1969 to 1975, he was the legal adviser at the Board of Censors for Motion Pictures. During the 1970s, he worked at the Office of the Solicitor General, the Professional Regulation Commission as an acting Commissioner, and as Commissioner of the Civil Service Commission. He also worked as a “confidential assistant” to the chair of the Presidential Anti-Graft Commission and an advisor in the Philippine National Bank.

=== Judicial career ===
In 1986, Melo was appointed to the Court of Appeals by President Corazon Aquino. About six years later, he was appointed by President Fidel Ramos to the Supreme Court on August 10, 1992. Melo served for ten years on the High Court, retiring after reaching the mandatory retirement age of 70 on May 30, 2002.

=== Melo Commission ===
On August 21, 2006, President Gloria Macapagal Arroyo created an investigating body headed by Melo to probe the extrajudicial and political killings which had targeted militant activists and members of the press. The body, popularly known as the Melo Commission, rendered a report which concluded that most of the killings were instigated by the Armed Forces of the Philippines, but found no proof linking the murder of activists to a "national policy" as claimed by the left-wing groups. On the other hand, the report "linked state security forces to the murder of militants and recommended that military officials, notably retired major general Jovito Palparan, be held liable under the principle of command responsibility for killings in their areas of assignment."

=== Commission on Elections ===
In January 2008, three months after the resignation of then-COMELEC Chairman Benjamin Abalos, President Macapagal-Arroyo announced the appointment of Melo as Chairman of the Commission on Elections. The announcement was not spared from criticisms as critics pointed out his role as Abalos' lawyer when he testified in the Senate investigation into the NBN-ZTE deal. Nevertheless, his appointment was confirmed by the Commission on Appointments in June 2008. During his term, he oversaw the country's transition to full automated elections leading up to the 2010 general election. He also introduced reforms for detainee voting and campaign finance reporting. He resigned from his post in January 2011 cutting short his supposedly seven-year term. He was succeeded by Sixto Brillantes.

== Personal life and death ==
Melo was married to Norma Cruz, with whom he had three children, Olivia Ann, Jaime Alberto, and Jorge Alfonso.

He died on October 18, 2020, and was cremated on October 21. Melo was the second ex-COMELEC chief to have died in 2020 after his successor Sixto Brillantes died of COVID-19 last August 11.

Preceded by Romeo A. Brawner (Acting)	COMELEC Chairman; 2008– 2011	Succeeded by Sixto Brillantes
Preceded by Ameurfina Melencio-Herrera	Associate Justice of the Supreme Court of the Philippines; 1992–2002	Succeeded by Conchita Carpio Morales
