= Romeo Poquiz =

Retired Philippine Air Force general

- Born: Romeo de Vera Poquiz; October 14, 1958 (age 68); Quezon, Isabela
- Alma mater: Philippine Military Academy
- Spouse: Marilyn Poquiz
- Military career
- Allegiance: Philippines
- Branch: Philippine Air Force
- Service years: 1981–2014
- Rank: Major general
- Commands: 2nd Air Division; 710th Special Operations Wing

Romeo De Vera Poquiz (born October 14, 1958) is a retired Philippine Air Force general. He was a Duterte administration government official.

He is noted for leading a group of retired generals in allegedly calling for the military's abandonment of President Bongbong Marcos in 2025.

== Early life and education ==
Poquiz was born in the newly established settlement of Quezon, Isabela on October 14, 1958. He was the second child of ten of Dominador Poquiz and Julita de Vera. He completed his primary and secondary education at La Salette School of Quezon. Poquiz graduated from the Philippine Military Academy with a Bachelor of Science degree in 1981.

In 2000, Poquiz acquired his Master of Science degree in Management (Finance) from the Naval Postgraduate School in Monterey, California.

== Military career ==
Poquiz joined the Armed Forces of the Philippines (AFP) the day after his graduation from the PMA.

In 1986, Poquiz was among the Philippine Air Force (PAF) personnel who piloted helicopter gunships during the AFP's anti-illegal drug operations within the Cordillera.

In the early 2000s, Poquiz commanded the 710th Special Operations Wing. He led the Air Force's elite special operations unit against communist rebels. In 2004, Poquiz was among the recipients of the annual Ten Outstanding Soldiers of the Philippines (TOSP) award from the Rotary Club of Makati-Metro and Metrobank Foundation. In 2014, he was a recipient of the Award for Continuing Excellence and Service (ACES) from the Metrobank Foundation - an award reserved for those who demonstrate extreme competence and integrity.

On October 11, 2010, Poquiz took his oath as the Assistant Deputy Chief of Staff (ADCS) for Logistics under the AFP, where he oversaw the strategic logistical requirements for the entire AFP. In September 2012, he was promoted to the rank of major general as Air Force Inspector General. He was responsible for maintaining the highest standards of discipline and efficiency within the PAF. By April 8, 2013, Poquiz replaced Lt. General Roy Deveraturda as commander of the 2nd Air Division of the Philippine Air Force, as the AFP commander of the whole Visayas, a position he held until his retirement on October 13, 2014. As commander, he led major operations in the Visayas, notably the critical handling of the rescue and relief efforts in the aftermath of Typhoon Haiyan (Yolanda) in November 2013.

During a testimonial ceremony for his retirement in Mactan, Cebu on October 13, 2014, Poquiz received an honorary military badge and a Command Plaque from Lieutenant General Jeffrey Delgado, while his wife Marilyn was also awarded a Plaque of Appreciation.

Poquiz served as President of PMA Dimalupig Class 1981.

== Post-retirement activities ==
During the administration of President Rodrigo Duterte, Poquiz was a member of the board of directors at the Bases Conversion and Development Authority (BCDA) under the Office of the President from 2016 to May 2018. By August 2018, Poquiz was appointed by president Duterte to the board of directors of the Philippine National Oil Company (PNOC). In April 2022, he was inducted to the board of directors of the Philippine Military Academy Retirees Association, Inc. (PMARAI).

During the lead-up to the 2022 presidential election, Poquiz organized caravans for the campaign of former senator Bongbong Marcos and his running mate Sara Duterte, the mayor of Davao City. Around this period, Poquiz was noted to have spread false information regarding the victims of martial law under President Ferdinand Marcos Sr., claiming that each of the "3,257" casualties under the Marcos regime were communist rebels. Both Marcos and Duterte eventually won the presidency and vice presidency respectively.

Despite his initial support for President Marcos, Poquiz later became a vocal critic of his administration amid a feud between the Marcos and Duterte political families. He expressed criticism of the administration's actions against China's aggression within the West Philippine Sea, stating that "We don't have to bow to China. But we also don't need to die for America[....] Let's not be another Ukraine." When San Miguel Corporation CEO Ramon Ang offered his assistance in solving the flood problem in Metro Manila, Poquiz expressed his support, stating that Ang's solution was straightforward enough that every government official should resign in shame.

=== Calls for the military to abandon President Marcos ===
In May 2025, Poquiz established the United People's Initiative (UPI), a coalition of retired military generals based in Metro Manila, for which he serves as its lead convenor. In September 2025, Poquiz began leading the UPI in protests against the Marcos administration, calling for a dialogue with General Romeo Brawner Jr., Chief of Staff of the AFP. Cited among the reasons for the group's indignation include the large-scale corruption scandal involving flood control projects and the proposed revisions to their pension plan.

On the evening before the September 21 anti-corruption rallies, Poquiz led seven other retired generals in visiting Camp Aguinaldo in Quezon City to meet with General Brawner, who was then holding a red alert meeting with joint battle staff. According to Brawner, Poquiz attempted to convince him to have the military remove its support for President Marcos, reasoning that it was the solution to the ongoing corruption scandal in the country, and that "somebody else deserves to be president, but they did not mention who that is". Brawner refused their proposal, citing the military's loyalty to the Constitution. Observers have described the proposal as a "soft coup", but the UPI has claimed that it only proposed for Marcos' resignation, not his forced removal.

Several retired generals of the Armed Forces strongly denounced Poquiz's group for the alleged ouster calls, while the administration has since deemed UPI's actions to potentially be seditious and treasonous, although president Marcos was noted to have been unbothered by the retired generals' actions.

The UPI led by Poquiz held another protest in November 2025. Secretary Rey Valeros vowed no seditious statement will be made.

Poquiz was arrested at the Ninoy Aquino International Airport on January 5, 2026 on sedition charges and was linked to his activities in November 2025. He posted bail after his detention.

== Personal life ==
Poquiz is married to Marilyn Poquiz. He served as chairman of the Mactan Island Golf Club in the 2010s.
