= Political killings in the Philippines (2001–2010) =

The political killings in the Philippines are a series of extrajudicial killings and enforced disappearances of left-wing politicians and activists, journalists, human rights advocates, the political opposition, and outspoken clergy that have increased dramatically since 2001.

Numerous actors are said to be responsible for these killings which include the New People's Army and the Moro Islamic Liberation Front. Left-wing political groups, such as the Bagong Alyansang Makabayan, meanwhile blame the Armed Forces of the Philippines, the Philippine National Police, the Citizen Armed Force Geographical Unit, and government-backed militias. They state that it is part of the official government policy of eradicating the threat from the insurgency of the Communist Party of the Philippines and was officially sanctioned by the administration of Gloria Macapagal Arroyo with the codename of Oplan Bantay Laya (Operation Plan Bantay Laya).

These series of events have placed the Philippines on the human rights watch lists of the United Nations and the United States Congress. Philip Alston, the United Nations Special Rapporteur on extrajudicial killings has criticized the Philippine government for not doing enough to stop the killings, many of which had been linked to government anti-insurgency operations.

== Background ==
The political killings in the Philippines, with an estimated death toll of over 1,200 in 2010, began during the administration of Gloria Macapagal Arroyo in 2001. These include extrajudicial harassment, torture, disappearances and murder of civilian non-combatants by the military and police. The events are thought to be linked to the "war on terrorism" in 2001 and includes more than 850 mainstream journalists and other public figures and the harassment, detention, or torture of untold more.

The historian, E. San Juan, Jr. writes that the estimates of killings vary on the precise number, with the government estimating only 114. It has failed to gain any convictions, and as of February 2007 had only arrested 3 suspects in the over 100 cases of assassination. He also alleges that the Arroyo government initially made no response to the dramatic increase in violence and killings writing that the "Arroyo has been tellingly silent over the killing and abduction of countless members of opposition parties and popular organizations". He later writes in February 2007, that the United Nations Special Rapporteur Philip Alston implicated the Philippine police and military are responsible for the crimes, and in his report, Alston charged Arroyo's propaganda and counter-insurgency strategy with the act that "encourage or facilitate the extra-judicial killings of activists and other enemies" of the state. and that "the AFP remains in a state of almost total denial… of its need to respond effectively and authentically to the significant number of killings which have been convincingly attributed to them"

Most of those killed or "disappeared" were peasant or worker activists belonging to progressive groups such as Bayan Muna, Anakpawis, GABRIELA, Anakbayan, Karapatan, KMU, and others (Petras and Abaya 2006). They were protesting Arroyo's repressive taxation, collusion with foreign capital tied to oil and mining companies that destroy people's livelihood and environment, fraudulent use of public funds, and other anti-people measures. Such groups and individuals have been tagged as "communist fronts" by Arroyo's National Security Advisers, the military, and police; the latter agencies have been implicated in perpetrating or tolerating those ruthless atrocities.

— Dr. E. San Juan, Jr.,

The online publication Bulatlat states that "[A]ccording to a recent international fact-finding mission of Dutch and Belgian judges and lawyers, [the government-created body] Task Force Usig 'has not proven to be an independent body…the PNP has a poor record as far as the effective investigation of the killings is concerned and is mistrusted by the Philippine people". Task Force Usig dismissed nearly half of the 114 cases of assassination as "cold" and, of the 58 cases where charges were brought, has secured only convictions only twice.

As a result of the state of emergency in 2006, Presidential Proclamation 1017 was signed by Gloria Macapagal Arroyo, which according to Cher S Jimenez writing in Asia Times Online,

grants exceptional unchecked powers to the executive branch, placing the country in a state of emergency and permitting the police and security forces to conduct warrantless arrests against enemies of the state, including...members of the political opposition and journalists from critical media outlets. With 185 dead, 2006 is so far (2007) the highest annual mark for extrajudicial government murders. Of the 2006 killings, the dead were "mostly left-leaning activists, murdered without trial or punishment for the perpetrators", the issuance of the proclamation conspicuously coincided with a dramatic increase in political violence and extrajudicial killings.

Then Secretary of Justice and former Human Rights Commissioner Leila de Lima stated that she was seeking a resolution to the problem. The New York Times reported in 2010 that an estimated 1,200 civilians had died due to the campaign.

In August 2010, the Armed Forces of the Philippines announced that the counter-insurgency program would end by December 31, 2010. Bagong Alyansang Makabayan condemned the extension.

== Fact-finding commissions ==
=== Alston Report ===
The following are interim recommendations from the Alston Report of United Nations Special Rapporteur on extrajudicial, summary or arbitrary executions Philip Alston published in 2007.

1. The Government [of the Philippines] should immediately direct all military officers to cease making public statements linking political or other civil society groups to those engaged in armed insurgencies. If such characterizations are ever to be made it must be by civilian authorities, on the basis of transparent criteria, and in conformity with the human rights provisions of the Constitution and relevant treaties;
2. The Government should commit to restoring the effectiveness of constitutionally mandated accountability arrangements, especially in relation to the role of Congressional oversight;
3. In conjunction with the executive branch of Government, the Supreme Court should use its constitutional powers over the practice of law to impress upon prosecutors that they have a duty to the public to uphold and protect human rights by acting to ensure the effective investigation of cases and protection of witnesses;
4. The Ombudsman's office should begin to take seriously its independent constitutional role in responding to extrajudicial killings plausibly attributed to public officials;
5. The Government should provide the Special Rapporteur with a copy of an "order of battle" relating to one of the zones in the country in which significant conflict is currently occurring.

=== Melo Commission ===
On August 21, 2006, President Gloria Macapagal Arroyo created an investigating body headed by former Supreme Court Justice Jose Melo to probe the extrajudicial and political killings that had targeted militant activists and members of the press. The body, popularly known as the Melo Commission, rendered a report that concluded that most of the killings were instigated by the Armed Forces of the Philippines, but found no proof linking the murder of activists to a "national policy" as claimed by the left-wing groups. On the other hand, the report "linked state security forces to the murder of militants and recommended that military officials, notably retired major general Jovito Palparan, be held liable under the principle of command responsibility for killings in their areas of assignment."

== Reactions ==
=== Philippine government ===
The government of the Philippines has denied any involvement in the killings, and said, in 2007, that a drop by 83% in the number of political killings that year "underline the Arroyo government's strong commitment to human rights and its firm resolve to put an end to these unexplained killings and put their perpetrators behind bars." This was said to be the result in the creation of a task force was created in 2006 as the government's response to the extrajudicial killings. Gloria Macapagal Arroyo has publicly condemned political killings "in the harshest possible terms" and urged witnesses to come forward, although the sincerity of the condemnation was in doubt due to the continuation of the killings.

The Armed Forces of the Philippines, meanwhile, boasted the achievements of the counter-insurgency program stating that the said plan has reduced the number of militants from the Communist Party of the Philippines and the New People's Army in several provinces of the Philippines.

=== Left-wing activists ===
Left-wing politicians from the Bagong Alyansang Makabayan, including Satur Ocampo, Liza Maza, Teddy Casiño, Rafael V. Mariano, and Luzviminda Ilagan, has stated in 2010 that the government of Benigno Aquino III should "acknowledge the existence of extrajudicial executions of activists and scrap the operation plan behind these murders" and that "they are willing to sit down with Aquino to present their concerns and offer solutions if the President wants to". They further said that "Aquino's vow to uphold human rights should be measured by concrete political and military reforms he is ready to initiate in his government, starting with the scrapping of Oplan Bantay Laya and its criminal component of targeting activists and civilians".

=== Human rights organizations ===
Human rights organizations and media watchdogs criticized the Philippine government for failing to act against the killings including, Human Rights Watch, Freedom House, Amnesty International, the Committee to Protect Journalists, and Reporters Without Borders.

Reporters Without Borders stated that:

Police officers, soldiers, or militiamen have been implicated in most of the hundred or so murders of journalists since democracy was restored in 1986. Employed by corrupt politicians or hired as contract killers, they usually target local radio presenters who have upset the people they are working for. The same modus operandi is nearly always used: two masked men on a motorcycle gun the journalist down as he is leaving his place of work. For a few thousand dollars, they eliminate the person who has been too outspoken. The cycle of violence has never ended because the culture of impunity is so strong, especially on Mindanao.

Amnesty International stated that ...

...the more than 860 confirmed murders are clearly political in nature because of "the methodology of the attacks, including prior death threats and patterns of surveillance by persons reportedly linked to the security forces, the leftist profile of the victims and climate of impunity which, in practice, shields the perpetrators from prosecution." And the arrest and threatened arrest of leftist Congress Representatives and others on charges of rebellion, and intensifying counter-insurgency operations in the context of a declaration by officials in June of 'all-out-war' against the New People's Army . . . [and] the parallel public labeling by officials of a broad range of legal leftist groups as communist 'front organizations'...has created an environment in which there is heightened concern that further political killings of civilians are likely to take place.

— Amnesty International,

While Human Rights Watch, in a 2008 report, reported

2006 saw a sharp increase in the number of extrajudicial killings, which coincided with President Gloria Macapagal Arroyo's June 2006 declaration of an "all-out war" against communist insurgents called the National People's Army (NPA)...the Philippine government is consistently failing in its obligations under international human rights law to hold accountable perpetrators of politically motivated killings....With inconclusive investigations, implausible suspects, and no convictions, impunity prevails....Out of hundreds of killings and "disappearances" over the past five years, there have been only two successfully prosecuted cases resulting in the conviction of four defendants....The number of senior military officers convicted either for direct involvement or under command responsibility remains zero. The doctrine of command responsibility in international law means that superior officers can be held criminally liable for the actions of their subordinates, and also if a superior had reason to know that subordinates under his command committed an offence and failed to use all feasible means under his command to prevent and punish it, he too may be found guilty for the offence.

— Human Rights Watch,

Human Rights Watch further wrote that the murders and kidnappings are rarely investigated by the police or other government agencies; they often go unreported because of fears of reprisal against the victims or their families. The Philippine National Police blamed investigative failures on this reluctance, but as Human Rights Watch writes:

[W]itnesses are indeed reluctant to cooperate with police investigations, because of fear that they would be targeted by doing so. An extremely weak witness protection program exacerbates this problem....[P]olice are often unwilling to vigorously investigate cases implicating members of the AFP. Families of some victims told Human Rights Watch that when they reported relevant cases to the police, police often demanded that the families themselves produce evidence and witnesses. Even when police filed cases with a court, they often identified the perpetrators either as long-wanted members of the NPA or simply as "John Doe." Some families told Human Rights Watch that police gave up investigating after only a few days.

— Human Rights Watch,

The human rights watchdog, Karapatan, documented 169,530 human rights violations against individuals, 18,515 against families, 71 against communities, and 196 against households. One person is said to be killed every three days during the Arroyo regime or a total of 271 persons as of December 2003.

=== Foreign governments ===
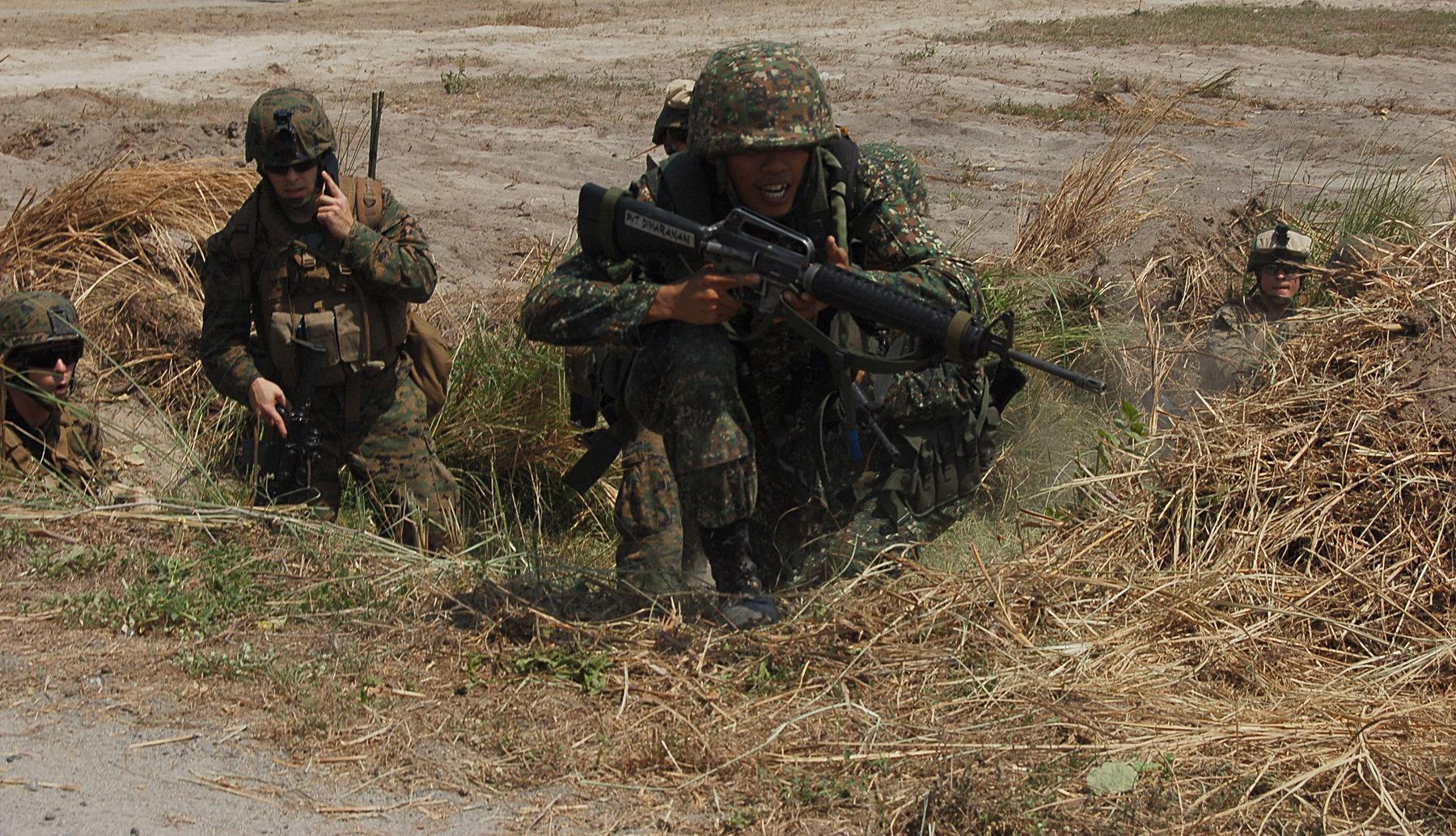
United States Marines training with Philippine Marines under the Balikatan exercises.

==== European Union ====
The European Union lamented the lack of court convictions in cases of political killings ... despite a marked decline in the incidents due to international pressure on the government. Alistair MacDonald, ambassador of the European Commission, said the drop in the number of extrajudicial killings in [ ... 2007] was a welcome development. But he noted that 'it is regrettable that as yet there have been no convictions in relation to the killings of political activists' and the attacks were continuing despite pronouncements by the Philippine government to address the issue.

==== United States ====
The United States State Department report on human rights had criticized the government of the Philippines for failing to stop these killings saying that:

Arbitrary, unlawful, and extrajudicial killings by elements of the security services and political killings, including killings of journalists, by a variety of actors continued to be major problems. Concerns about impunity persisted. Members of the security services committed acts of physical and psychological abuse on suspects and detainees, and there were instances of torture... Disappearances occurred, and arbitrary or warrantless arrests and detentions were common... Leftist and human rights activists often were subject to harassment by local security forces.

The United States State Department designates the Communist Party of the Philippines as a Foreign Terrorist Organization.

== See also ==
- Maguindanao massacre
- Operation Enduring Freedom – Philippines
- Filemon Lagman
- Journalists killed under the Arroyo administration
