= Counterintelligence Group =

Armed Forces of the Philippines Counterintelligence Group
- Active: 1989-1995; 18 January 2024; 22 months ago
- Country: Philippines
- Branch: Armed Forces of the Philippines
- Type: Military intelligence Counterintelligence
- Part of: Under the Armed Forces of the Philippines

Commanders
- Current commander: Colonel Jonathan Manio

The AFP Counterintelligence Group (Armed Forces of the Philippines Counterintelligence Group or AFP-CIG) is the counterintelligence command of the AFP. The first iteration of the AFP-CIG was created in 1989 until it was disbanded in 1995 during the administration of then president Fidel V. Ramos. The current iteration of the AFP-CIG was fully activated on January 18, 2024, after it was revived in 2005. It is mandated to conduct counterintelligence operations throughout the Philippines.

Its counterintelligence role is distinct from the Intelligence Service of the Armed Forces of the Philippines (ISAFP), the latter conducting intelligence operations under AFP command.

== History ==
=== 1989 to 1995 ===
The CIG was originally established on December 29, 1989, and tasked to "conduct intelligence and counterintelligence operations to detect and identify active and former military and police personnel and their cohorts involved in criminal activities" in accordance with Executive Order No. 280. The command was originally involved in protecting the administration of then president Corazon Aquino against coup attempts and going after rogue soldiers who were reported to participate in bank heists and kidnapping operations.

The CIG was disbanded on October 16, 1995, its functions transferred to the Presidential Task Force on Intelligence and Counterintelligence Against Scalawags. According to then President Ramos, as the CIG had been successful in the "neutralization and prosecution of scalawags," the unit was no longer needed in the AFP.

=== 2005 ===
In 2005, the administration of then president Gloria Macapagal Arroyo revived the CIG to monitor coup attempts and corruption inside the AFP.

=== Modern ===
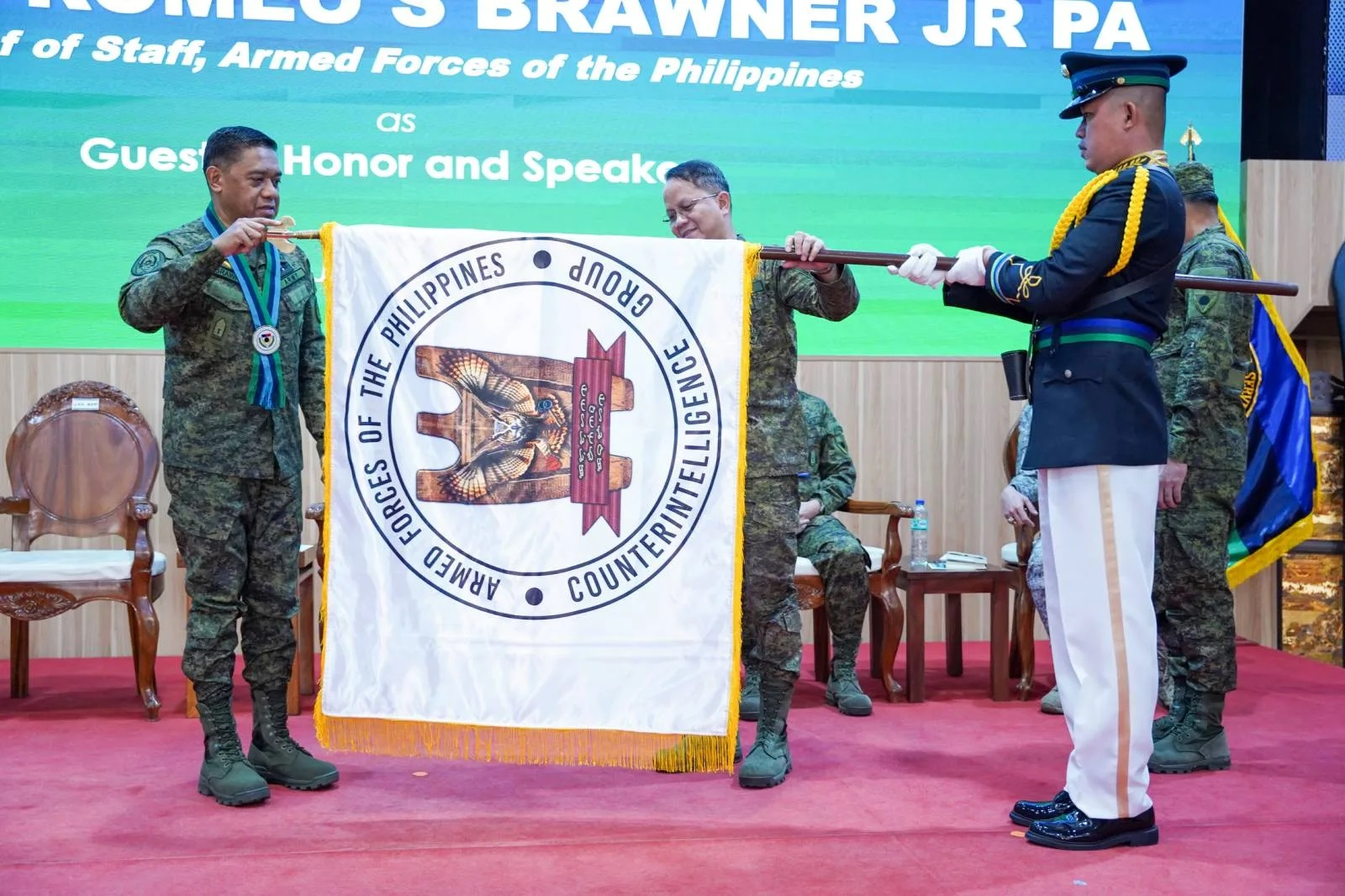
General Brawner Jr. in a ceremony to reactivate the CIG on January 18, 2024.

Prior to the CIG's full activation, rumors were raised of unrest and coup attempts from retired soldiers. AFP chief General Romeo Brawner Jr. spoke to President Bongbong Marcos about a supposed plot based on conversations he had with retired AFP officers on November 4, 2023. However, Colonel Medel Aguilar, the AFP spokesperson said that General Brawner was merely misquoted.

On December 21, 2023, General Romeo Brawner Jr. said in a speech that the CIG would be reestablished. According to AFP public affairs office chief, Col. Xerxes Trinidad, he said that the CIG's activation was based on a directive issued on January 11, 2024, by Defense secretary Gilbert Teodoro.

On January 18, 2024, General Brawner Jr. led the ceremony to activate the CIG at AFP General Headquarters. The unit would be led by Colonel Jonathan Manio, under AFP Deputy Chief of Staff for Intelligence Major General Ferdinand Barandon. AFP spokesperson Colonel Francel Margareth Padilla explained that the CIG's mandate includes counter-infiltration, counter-espionage, and counter-sabotage operations.
