= Romeo Brawner Jr. =

Philippine Army general (born 1968)

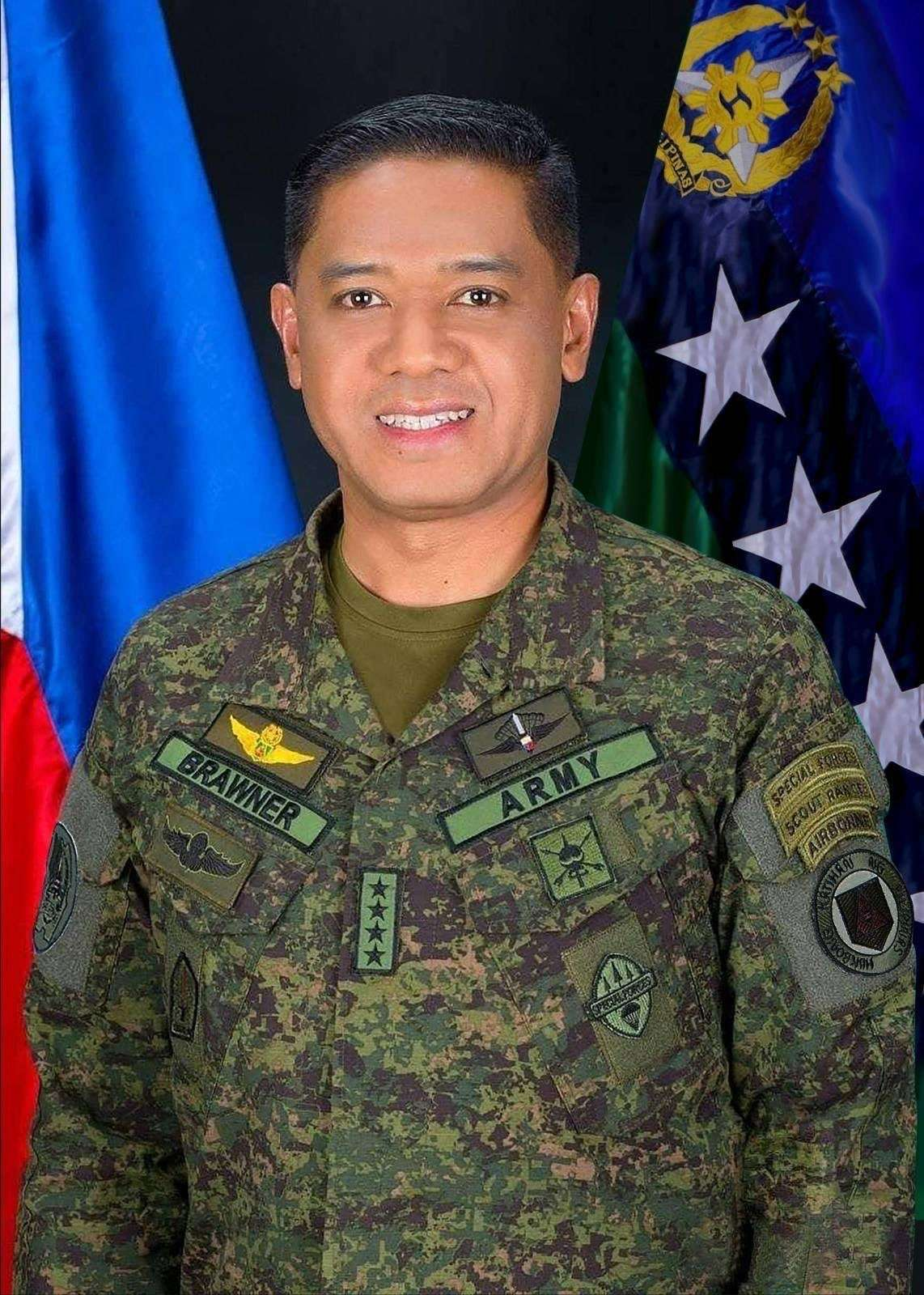
- Official portrait, 2023
- Born: Romeo Saturnino Brawner, Jr. March 18, 1968 (age 58); Baguio, Philippines
- Education: Philippine Military Academy (BS); Ateneo de Manila University (MIM); Asian Institute of Technology (MBA); Oxford University (MBA); United States Army War College (MSS)
- Spouse: Melody Valeros
- Children: 3
- Relatives: Romeo Brawner Sr. (father); Felix Brawner Jr. (uncle); Teddy Baguilat (cousin)
- Military career
- Allegiance: Philippines
- Branch: Philippine Army
- Service years: 1989–2026
- Rank: General
- Service number: O-10052
- Commands: Chief of Staff of the Armed Forces of the Philippines; Commanding General of the Philippine Army; 4th Infantry Division; Deputy Chief of Staff for Financial Management, J10; Commandant of Cadets; 103rd Infantry Brigade; Army Civil-Military Operations Regiment; Chief of Public Affairs, AFP; 2nd Special Forces Battalion; 6th Special Forces Company
- Conflicts: Communist armed conflicts in the Philippines; Moro conflict Siege of Marawi

Romeo Saturnino Brawner Jr. (born March 18, 1968) is a retired Philippine Army general who served as the 60th Chief of Staff of the Armed Forces of the Philippines from July 21, 2023, until July 21, 2026. Prior to his appointment to the post, Brawner previously served as the 64th Commanding General of the Philippine Army.

Born and raised from a military family with American roots, Brawner graduated from Philippine Military Academy (PMA) "Makatao" Class of 1989, and has been primarily deployed in special operations and infantry units, such as the 2nd Special Forces Battalion and the 103rd Infantry Brigade. Brawner was also known for his role as spokesperson and deputy commander of Task Force Ranao during the Siege of Marawi and for his campaign against hazing during his term as Commandant of Cadets in the PMA. Brawner was also appointed as the first Deputy Chief of Staff for Financial Management, J10, before being named as the commander of the 4th Infantry Division.

== Early life and education ==
Brawner was born in Baguio to Lenora Fe (née Saturnino) and Romeo A. Brawner, Sr., the brother of former Brigadier General Felix A. Brawner Jr. Brawner's military roots came from his great-grandfather, Private Lisbon Brawner, an African-American soldier who served from the United States Army, and was part of the Buffalo Soldiers who was deployed to the country and served during the Philippine–American War.

Brawner finished high school at the University of the Philippines Baguio and served under the UP Vanguard ROTC before entering the Philippine Military Academy (PMA) in 1985 and graduating from the PMA as part of the Makatao Class of 1989, earning his commission as an army second lieutenant. Brawner also holds a Masters in Information Management from Ateneo de Manila University, a Masters in Business Administration from the Asian Institute of Technology, and subsequently from the European School of Management in Oxford University, and a Masters in Strategic Studies from the United States Army War College. Brawner also topped his class after completing the Intelligence Officer Course, the Special Forces Operations Course, and the AFP Comptrollership Course, as well completing the Advance Security Cooperation Course, located at the Asia-Pacific Center for Security Studies in Hawaii. In 2011, Brawner served as the Philippine Army representative during the United States Visitor Leadership Program (IVLP) on Foreign Policy, as well as during the IVLP on Cyber Security in 2013.

== Military career ==
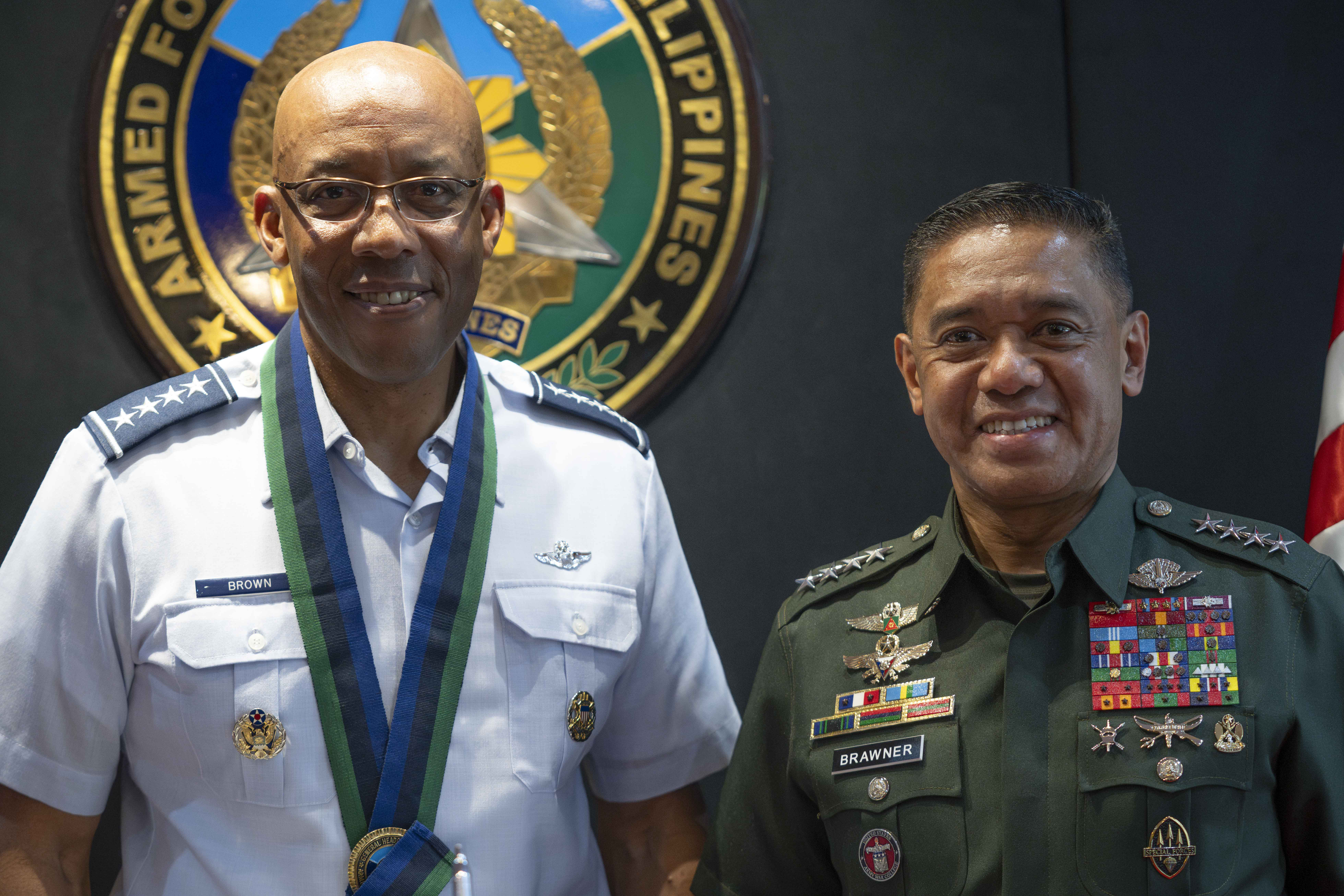
U.S. Chairman of the Joint Chiefs of Staff Charles Q. Brown Jr. with Brawner (right) in 2024.

As a junior officer, Brawner participated in military operations against the communist insurgents and Muslim separatists and terrorists in the Philippines. Throughout his career, Brawner served primarily in both infantry and special operations, before being placed in staff positions.

Brawner was named Company Commander of the 6th Special Forces Company was named as Battalion Commander of the 2nd Special Forces Battalion, before being an Operations Officer under the Special Forces Regiment (Airborne). Brawner also served as the Chief of Staff of the 6th Infantry Division, and was also named Chief of Public Affairs of the AFP, before serving as the AFP Spokesperson. Brawner eventually became commander of the Civil-Military Operations Regiment of the Philippine Army.

During the Siege of Marawi in 2017, Brawner subsequently served as spokesperson and deputy commander of Task Force Ranao, and served as one of the key commanders during the 5-month long battle. Brawner would be later conferred a Commendation Medal and Ribbon for his role. The following year, in 2018, Brawner took command of the 103rd Infantry Brigade under the 1st Infantry Division, and was tasked to root out the remnants of the Islamic State-associated militant terrorist organization Maute Group and its allies within Western Mindanao, including the death of Owayda Marohombsar, also known as Abu Dar, and was the successor of Isnilon Hapilon as the head of the Islamic State-linked terrorists, and the last remaining leader who escaped the Battle of Marawi and was neutralized after follow-up operations. Due to his accomplishment, Brawner was awarded the Order of Lapu-Lapu by President Rodrigo Duterte. Brawner was also tasked to monitor the 2019 Bangsamoro autonomy plebiscite elections and also led efforts for the Rehabilitation of Marawi. In the aftermath of the Death of Darwin Dormitorio due to hazing, Brawner was named the acting-Commandant of Cadets of the Philippine Military Academy in 2019, along with Rear Admiral Allan Ferdinand Cusi as its superintendent officer-in-charge, following the resignation of their predecessors, then-Brigadier General Bartolome Vicente Bacarro as Commandant of Cadets, and Lieutenant General Ronnie Evangelista as PMA Superintendent due to command responsibility. Brawner later served his term in full capacity as Commandant of Cadets.

In December 2020, Brawner was named as the first Deputy Chief of Staff for Financial Management, J10 after its foundation on 5 November 2020, which is in charge of the AFP's financial control, budgeting, and fiscal management, upon the approval of the Chief of Staff of the Armed Forces of the Philippines. On July 1, 2021, Brawner was named commander of the 4th Infantry Division, in charge with counterinsurgency operations in Northern Mindanao and Caraga regions. During his tenure as division commander of the 4th Infantry Division, Brawner finalized and oversaw a military operation under his supervision that led to the death of communist insurgent leader Jorge Madlos on October 31, 2021, in the outskirts of Impasugong, Bukidnon. Madlos, commonly known as Ka Oris, was the spokesperson of the New People's Army National Operational Command and the National Democratic Front.

=== Commanding General of the Philippine Army ===
Brawner was appointed the 64th Commanding General of the Philippine Army (CGPA) by President Rodrigo Duterte on December 7, 2021, and was eventually promoted to the rank of Lieutenant General on 27 December 2021. During his term as the CGPA, Brawner initiated reforms under his leadership thrust, known as "SERVE" thrust, which stands for Soldier, Enhance, Resources, Victorious and Elections, and is aimed at strengthening the soldier's well-being and mental health, enhancement and modernization, resource management, attaining victory against the CPP-NPA-NDF, and securing the country amidst the 2022 Philippine general elections. Then-Lieutenant General Brawner also supervised operations against the CPP-NPA-NDF, the Abu Sayyaf and other connected Islamist groups, and various private armed groups. Brawner also spearheaded the modernization of the Army through the procurement of various weapons and equipment such as the ATMOS 2000 self propelled howitzers, the Sabrah light tank, and various UAVs amongst other weapons, equipment and vehicles. Brawner also launched initiatives aimed at enhancing the personnel's mental health, and expanded benefits of Citizen Armed Force Geographical Units (CAFGU).

=== Chief of Staff of the Armed Forces of the Philippines ===
On July 21, 2023, Brawner was appointed as the 60th Chief of Staff of the Armed Forces of the Philippines, and replaced General Andres Centino, who was named as the Presidential Adviser on the West Philippine Sea. During his assumption speech, Brawner emphasized his command thrust to the acronym "UNITY", similar to the command thrust made by Lieutenant General Bartolome Vicente Bacarro. UNITY stand for Unification, Normalization, Internal Security Operations, Territorial Defense, and Youth, which is aimed at strengthening a unified organization, the normalization process of the Bangsamoro Region, intensified operations against insurgency and terrorism, preparedness against external threats, and youth development, including the potential revival of the Reserve Officers' Training Corps. In October 2023, Brawner laid out plans to upgrade the AFP Cyber Group to a command-style organization named the AFP Cyber Command, which is aimed to expand the AFP Cyber Group's cybersecurity operations and further defend the AFP's cyber networks by enlisting more personnel and procuring additional equipment for cyber defense. The AFP Cyber Group was later upgraded to become the AFP Cyber Command on late 2024. Brawner also emphasized the Cyber Group's importance in the modern battlefield due to the rise of both technological threats and cyber soldiers, and is also looking on the Digital and Intelligence Service of the Singapore Armed Forces as a potential model for the expansion of the Cyber Group.

In August 2024, Brawner Jr., became a Philippine Navy special forces 'Seal' honorary member after training at the Naval Special Operations Command for SEAL Qualification. In September 2024, Brawner expressed his desire to continually sustain the deployment of the US-made Typhon missile launcher in the country, citing the system's capabilities for external defense operations. Brawner also mentioned in August 2024 the AFP's plans to procure the Typhon missile system.

With the aim of further strengthening the AFP's shift from internal defense operation to an effective external defense posture, Brawner, alongside the Defense Department, led the creation of the Comprehensive Archipelagic Defense Concept, a defense concept that aims to boost country's inter-island defense strategy while aiming to secure the country's sea lanes, external territorial waters including the country's exclusive economic zones (EEZs), and other potential foreign threats. The concept also allow the AFP to be more adaptable towards intensifying inter-domain threats while applying the potential lessons learned from the Russian invasion of Ukraine while revitalizing the military's modernization program to fast track the procurement of modern weapons, equipment, and assets to counter evolving security threats within the modern battlefield. On the AFP's 89th Founding Anniversary held on 21 December 2024, Brawner also announced the introduction of the Tatag Kapuluan campaign plan, which serves as the AFP's campaign plan in aiming expand the AFP's holistic and harmonized approach towards defending the country's external borders and sovereignty.

Brawner also initiated the creation and upgrading of various military commands which is aimed to boost the AFP's preparedness against newer and more complex threats, while enhancing the AFP's capabilities in joint operations, such as the creation of the AFP Intelligence Command on 21 August 2024, which is aimed to strengthen and harmonize the AFP's intelligence operations; the AFP Joint Special Operations Command on 28 May 2025, which unifies and enhances the AFP's special operations units; the AFP Joint Sustainment Command on 22 September 2025, which is tasked to manage the AFP's logistical units, equipment, and support systems; and the AFP Civil-Military Operations Command on 13 November 2025, which is made to expand the AFP's civil-military engagements with other various sectors and to combat both fake news and misinformation. On 18 January 2024, Brawner also reactivated the AFP Counterintelligence Group, which is aimed to counter potential counterintelligence and espionage operations, as well as to counter potential classified military information leakages within the country. Brawner also led the reactivation of the National Capital Regional Command on 28 February 2025, and the creation of the AFP Strategic Command on 27 October 2025 and currently serves as the AFP's strategic operations command responsible for monitoring intelligence, military operations, and civil-military functions, and is also aimed to boost the AFP's interoperability and synchronization, which includes synergizing joint exercises with both military units and with other allied partners.

On the evening before the September 21 anti-corruption rallies in Metro Manila, Brawner met with eight retired military officers from the United People's Initiative (UPI), led by former Air Force general Romeo Poquiz, at Camp Aguinaldo after accepting their request letter to hold a meeting with him. In the meeting, Poquiz allegedly proposed for the military's removal of support for President Bongbong Marcos to solve the large-scale corruption scandal involving flood control projects, with Brawner recounting their argument that "somebody else deserves to be president, but they did not mention who that is". Brawner ultimately refused their proposal, citing the military's loyalty to the Constitution. Observers have described the proposal as a "soft coup", but the UPI has claimed that it only proposed for Marcos' resignation, not his forced removal.

In February 2026, under Brawner's helm, the AFP assumed the position as chairman of the ASEAN Observer Team (AOT) succeeding the Malaysian Armed Forces as part of ASEAN's unified efforts to promote transparency, confidence-building, and cooperation following the Thailand-Cambodia border crisis. As the Chair of the AOT, the AFP's role is only limited in observations, verifications, and reported updated developments on the grounds as part of ASEAN protocol and the principles of non-interference. Brawner also led the AFP delegation to meetings with the Royal Thai Armed Forces, including its Chief of Defence Forces General Ukris Boontanondha, and the Royal Cambodian Armed Forces and its Commander-in-chief General Vong Pisen. The AFP has also deployed additional teams under the helm of a major general, and will be assisted by a brigadier general as head of the AOT-Thailand and a commodore as head of the AOT-Cambodia. On 7 July 2026, Brawner has expressed that the AFP has laid out plans to create a Space Center that could later be transformed into a Space Command, which is seen as a critical assets for intelligence, surveillance and reconnaissance (ISR) operations, as well as communications, command and control, missile systems and drone operations. Brawner also stated that the AFP can begin with low-Earth orbit satellites that could also complement with other government satellite networks. On 21 July 2026, Brawner became the first AFP chief to complete a fixed three-year term under Republic Act 11939 and eventually retired from military service. He was later replaced by the Commanding General of the Philippine Army General Antonio Nafarrete.

== Awards and decorations ==
=== National decorations ===
- July 21, 2026: Philippine Legion of Honor, rank of Chief Commander - awarded "for his leadership in strengthening territorial defense, advancing military modernization, expanding defense partnerships, and launching the AFP's "MULAT" communication campaign on the West Philippine Sea as AFP Chief".
- Kamagi Medal of the Order of Lapu-Lapu

=== Personal military decorations ===
- Commander of the Philippine Legion of Honor
- Outstanding Achievement Medal
- Distinguished Service Star with four bronze anahaw leaves
- Gold Cross Medal
- Silver Cross Medal with one bronze anahaw leaf
- Meritorious Achievement Medal
- Distinguished Service Medal with two bronze anahaw leaves
- Chief of Staff, AFP Commendation Medal with one bronze anahaw leaf
- Gawad sa Kaunlaran Medal with one bronze anahaw leaf
- Bronze Cross Medal
- Silver Wing Medal with two bronze anahaw leaves
- Sagisag ng Ulirang Kawal Medal
- Military Merit Medal with one bronze spearhead device and one gold anahaw leaf
- Military Civic Action Medal with one silver and three bronze anahaw leaves
- 2 Parangal sa Kapanalig ng Sandatahang Lakas ng Pilipinas Medals
- Military Commendation Medal with four silver equilateral triangles

=== Campaign and service medals ===
- Long Service Medal with two bronze service stars
- Anti-Dissidence Campaign Medal with four bronze service stars
- Luzon Anti-Dissidence Campaign Medal with three bronze service stars
- Visayas Anti-Dissidence Campaign Medal with two bronze service stars
- Mindanao Anti-Dissidence Campaign Medal with one bronze service star
- Disaster Relief & Rehabilitation Operation Ribbon with two bronze service stars

=== Foreign honors ===
- ( (Malaysia) ) October 18, 2022: Honorary Courageous Commander of The Most Gallant Order of Military Service
- ( (United States) ) March 2023: Commander of the Legion of Merit
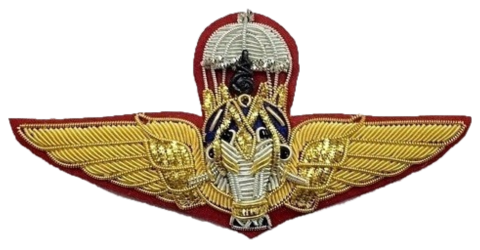
- Honorary Airborne Wings of the Royal Thai Army

=== Unit Decorations ===
- Philippine Republic Presidential Unit Citation
- People Power I Unit Citation
- People Power II Unit Citation
- Martial Law Unit Citation

=== Badges ===
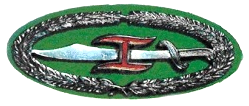
- Combat Commander's Kagitingan Badge
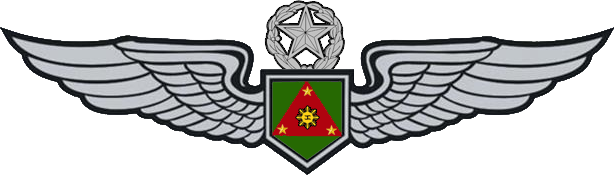
- Army Aviator's Badge
- PAF Gold Wings Badge
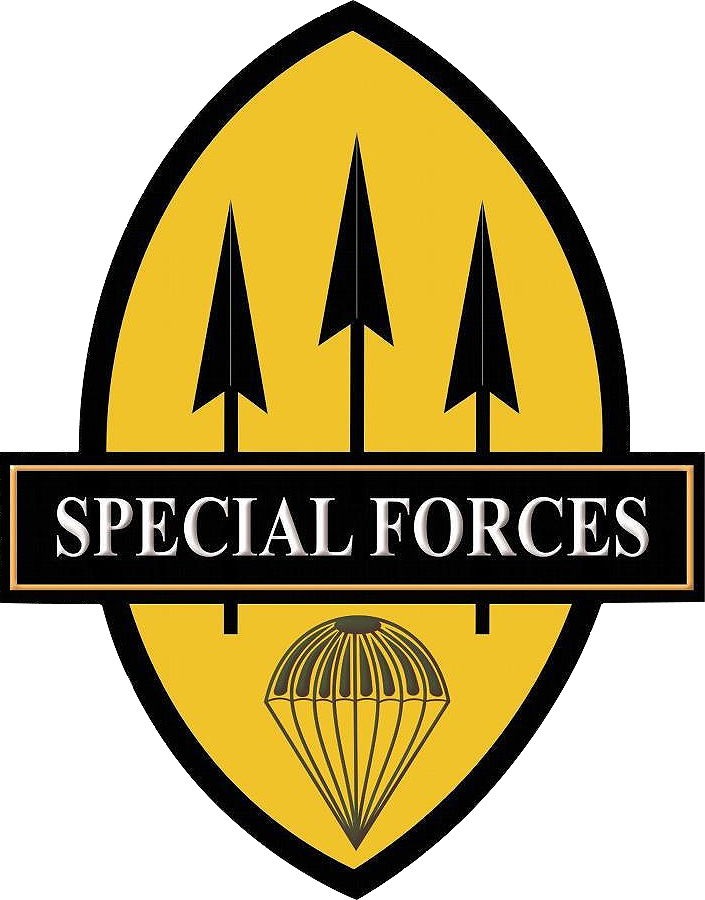
- Special Forces Qualification Badge
- Army Combat Diver Badge
- AFP Military Freefall Badge
- United States Army War College Badge

== Personal life ==
Brawner is often known by his peers and friends as "Romy" and "Omet". Brawner is married to Melody Mariele Valeros and they have three children. Brawner's first cousin, Teddy Baguilat, is a former Congressman. His hobbies include playing golf and being a disc jockey during his free time.

Brawner is also a column writer for the Philippine Daily Inquirer since May 2025.

Military offices
Preceded by Gen. Andres Centino	Commanding General of the Philippine Army; 2021–2023	Succeeded by Lt. Gen. Roy Galido
Preceded by Gen. Andres Centino	Chief of Staff of the Armed Forces of the Philippines; 2023–2026	Succeeded by Lt. Gen. Antonio Nafarrete
