= Romeo A. Brawner =

Filipino public official (1935–2008)

Romeo Brawner

Chairman of the Commission on Elections
- Acting
- In office February 2 – March 25, 2008
- Appointed by: Gloria Macapagal Arroyo
- Preceded by: Resurreccion Borra
- Succeeded by: Jose Melo

COMELEC Commissioner
- In office September 18, 2005 – May 29, 2008
- Appointed by: Gloria Macapagal Arroyo

Personal details
- Born: September 17, 1935 Solano, Nueva Vizcaya, Philippine Islands
- Died: May 29, 2008 (aged 72) Quezon City, Philippines
- Spouse: Lenora Fe Saturnino
- Children: Romeo Brawner Jr.
- Relatives: Felix Brawner Jr. (brother); Teddy Baguilat (nephew)

Romeo Aliac Brawner (September 17, 1935 – May 29, 2008) was a Filipino public official who served as a Commissioner of the Philippine Commission on Elections (COMELEC) from 2005 until his death from a heart attack in May 2008. From February to March 2008, he served as the acting chair of the COMELEC, by virtue of his being the most senior Commissioner on the commission, replacing Resurreccion Borra on the February 2, 2008 after the latter had retired.

== Biography ==
Brawner was born in Solano, Nueva Vizcaya, the grandson of Private Lisbon Brawner, an African-American soldier who served from the United States Army, and was part of the Buffalo Soldiers who served during the Philippine–American War.

Brawner earned his law degree from the University of the Philippines College of Law in 1959. He entered the Philippine judiciary in 1975 as a trial court judge in Baguio. In 1995, he was appointed by President Fidel Ramos as a Justice of the Court of Appeals of the Philippines. In 2005, President Gloria Macapagal Arroyo appointed Brawner as Presiding Justice of the Court of Appeals. Immediately upon his retirement from the Court of Appeals, having reached the compulsory retirement age of 70, President Arroyo named Brawner as Commissioner of the COMELEC.

Prior to his appointment as a Baguio City Court judge and later, as Regional Trial Court Judge of Branch 10 in La Trinidad, Benguet (January 1987 to August 1995), he served as a public prosecutor for 11 years, and was also a professor of law at the Baguio Colleges Foundation (University of the Cordilleras), from 1971 to 1995. Also a native of Kiangan, Ifugao, he was a Bureau of Internal Revenue collection agent and a Knight of Columbus member. He was conferred the Chief Justice Jose Laurel Judicial Excellence Award as outstanding judge from the Foundation for Judicial Excellence in 1995.

Brawner grew up in Solano, Nueva Vizcaya.

== Members of the Brawner Commission ==
Assumed office: February 2, 2008 Dissolved: March 25, 2008

#	Name	Position
1	Romeo A. Brawner	Acting Chairman/Commissioner
2	Rene V. Sarmiento	Commissioner
3	Nicodemo T. Ferrer	Commissioner
4	Moslemen T. Macarambon Sr.	Commissioner

== See also ==
- Commission on Elections (Philippines)

Preceded by Resurreccion Borra (Acting)	COMELEC Chairman; February 2 – March 25, 2008	Succeeded by Jose Melo
