= Moslemen T. Macarambon Sr. =

Filipino public servant

COMELEC Commissioner
- In office November 5, 2007 – October 10, 2008
- Preceded by: Mehol Sadain

Personal details
- Born: January 21, 1941 (age 85) Saguiaran

Moslemen T. Macarambon Sr. is a Filipino public servant who is a commissioner of the Philippine Commission on Elections. Before he join COMELEC, he was regional trial court judge in Iligan City. He also served as the president of National Transmission Corporation (TransCo) from July 16, 2009, to October 31, 2010.

== Members of the Brawner Commission ==
Assumed office: Nov. 5, 2007

| # | Name | Position |
|---|---|---|
| 1 | Romeo Brawner | Acting Chairman/Commissioner |
| 2 | Rene V. Sarmiento | Commissioner |
| 3 | Nicodemo T. Ferrer | Commissioner |
| 4 | Moslemen T. Macarambon Sr. | Commissioner |

== See also ==
- Commission on Elections (Philippines)

| Preceded by Mehol Sadain (Acting) | COMELEC Commissioner; Nov. 5 2007 – October 10, 2008 | Succeeded by |
