= Solano, Nueva Vizcaya =

Municipality in Nueva Vizcaya, Philippines

Solano
- Municipality
- Municipality of Solano
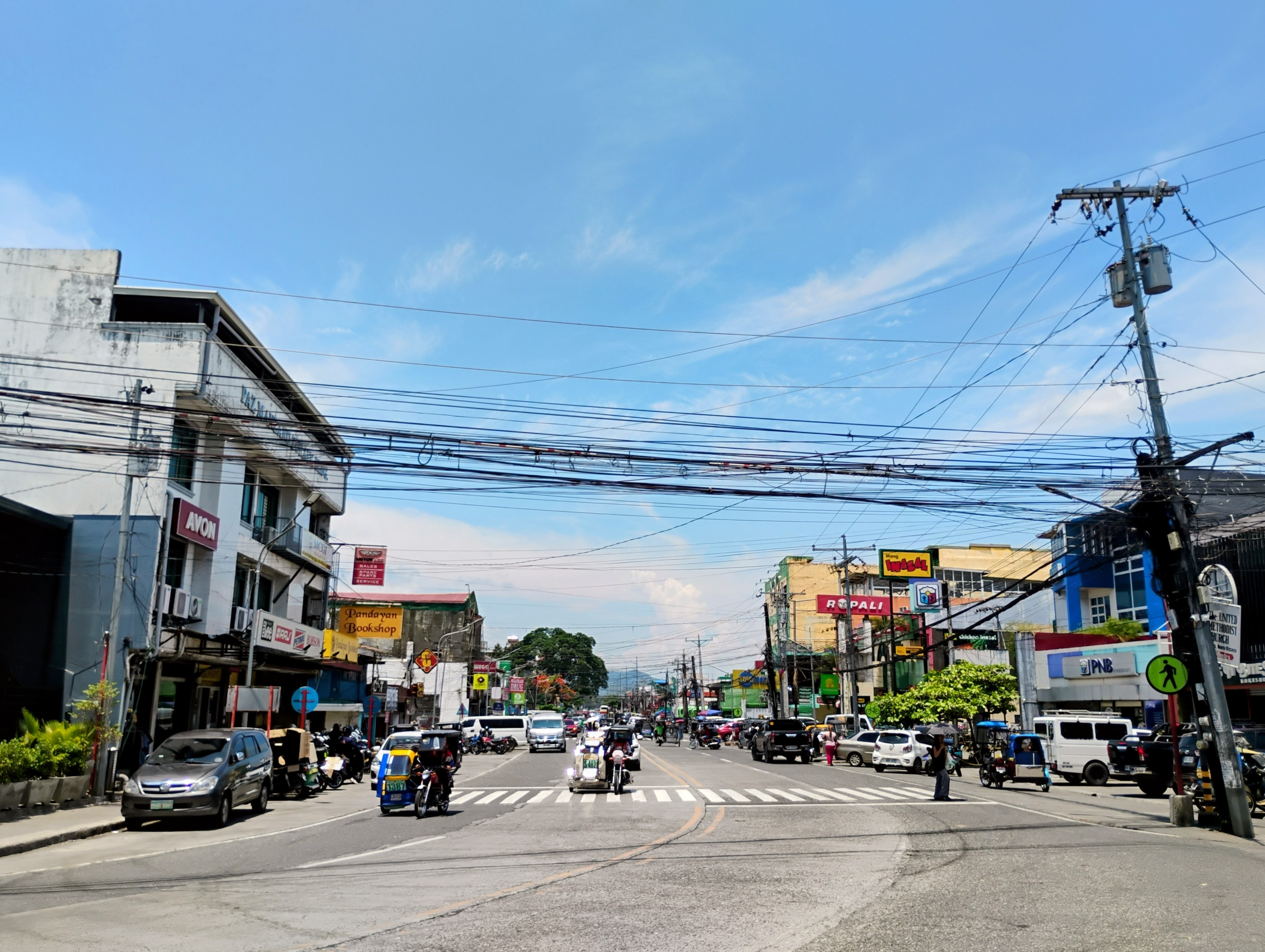
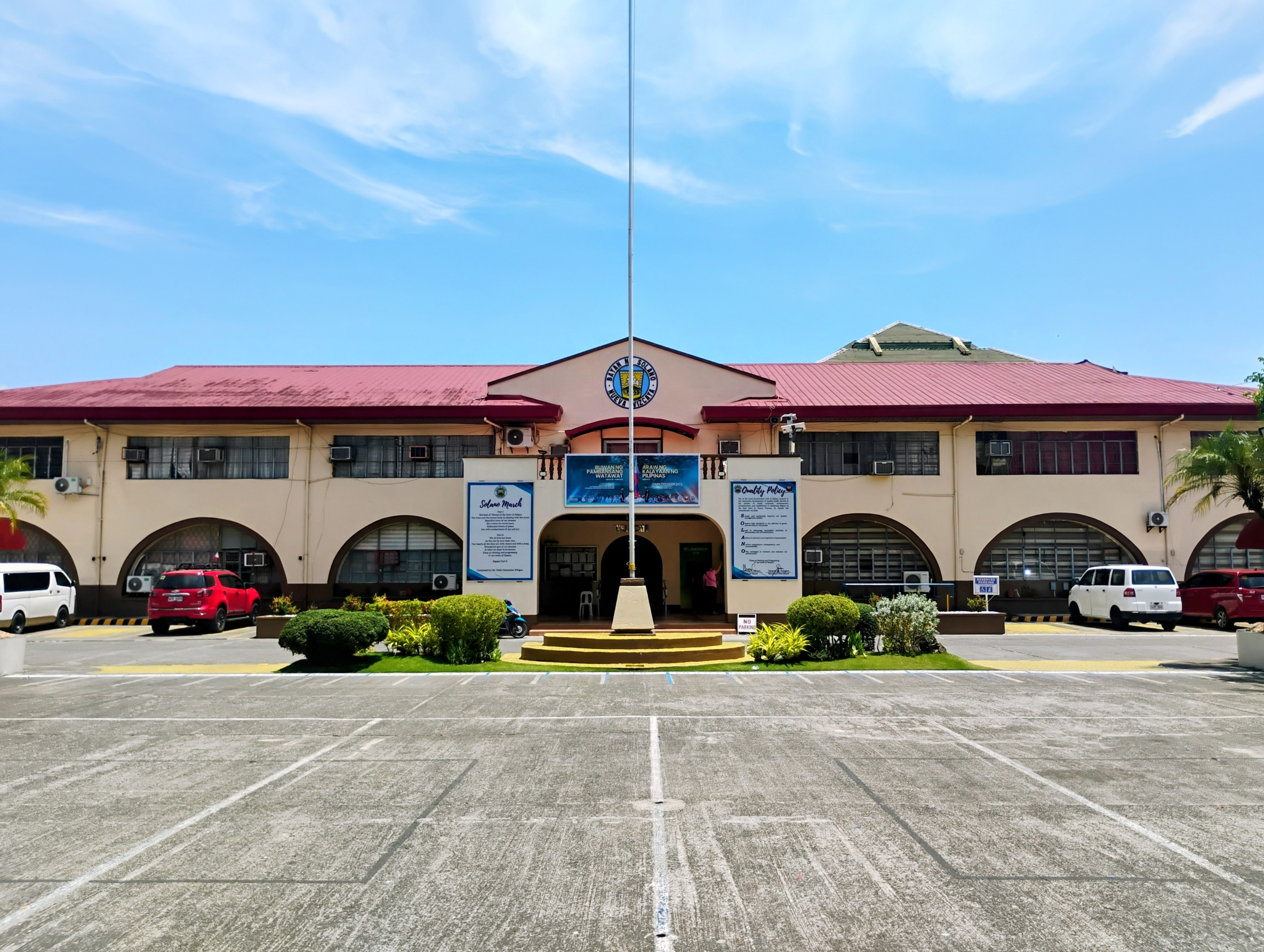
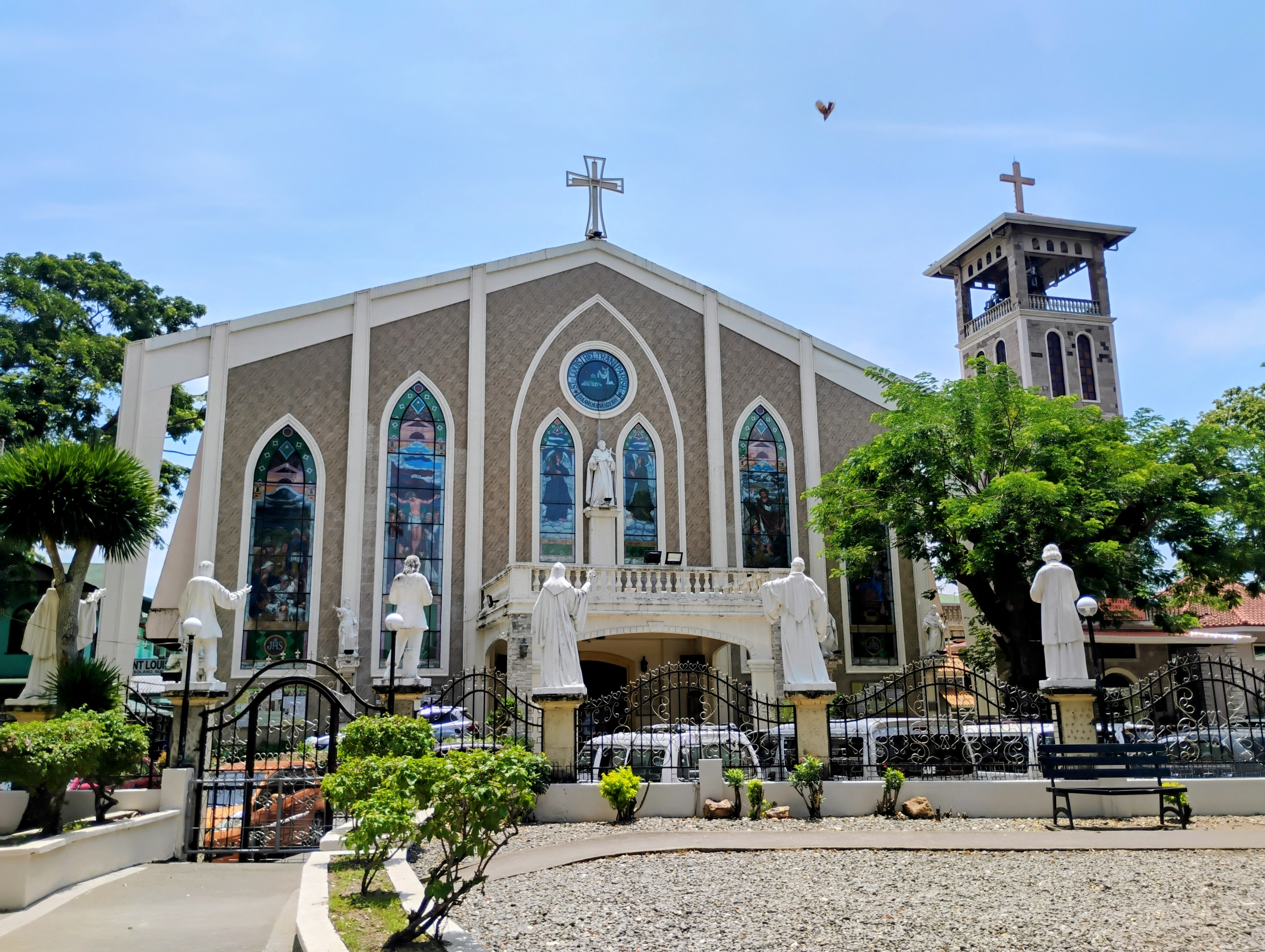
- Solano Town Proper Solano Municipal Hall Saint Louis Beltran Parish Church

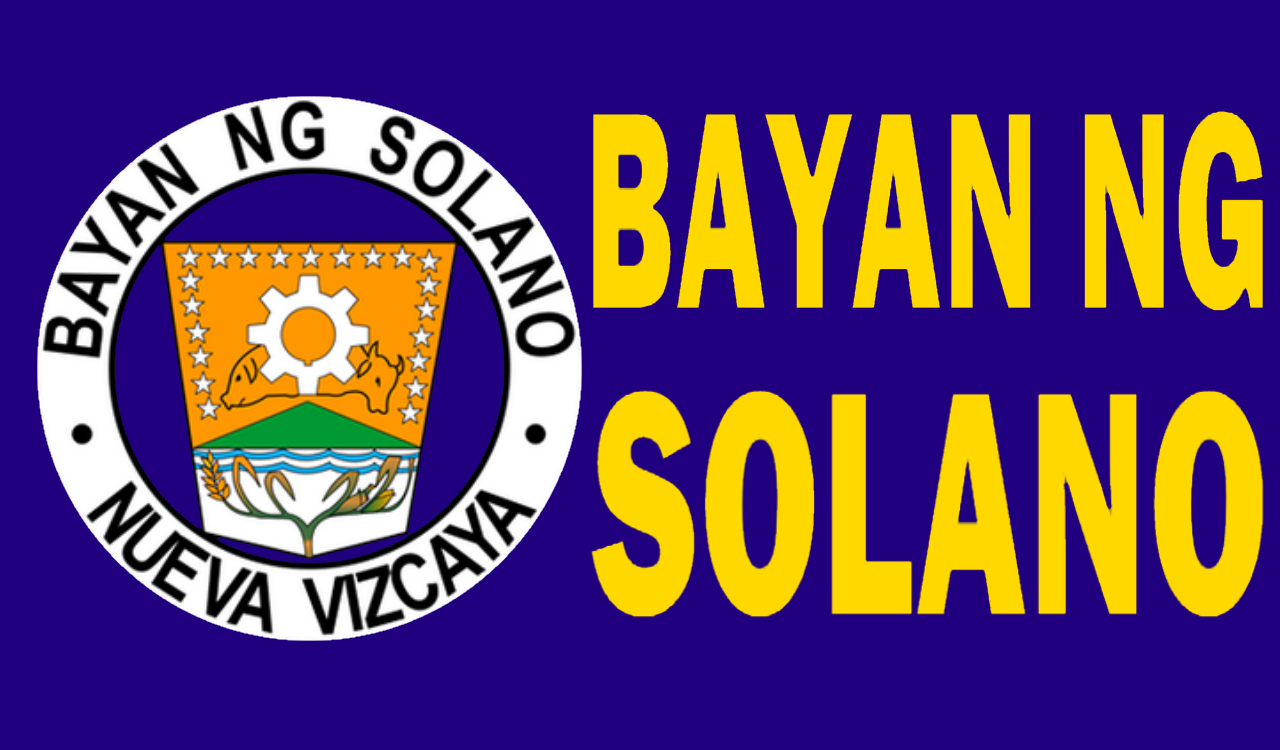
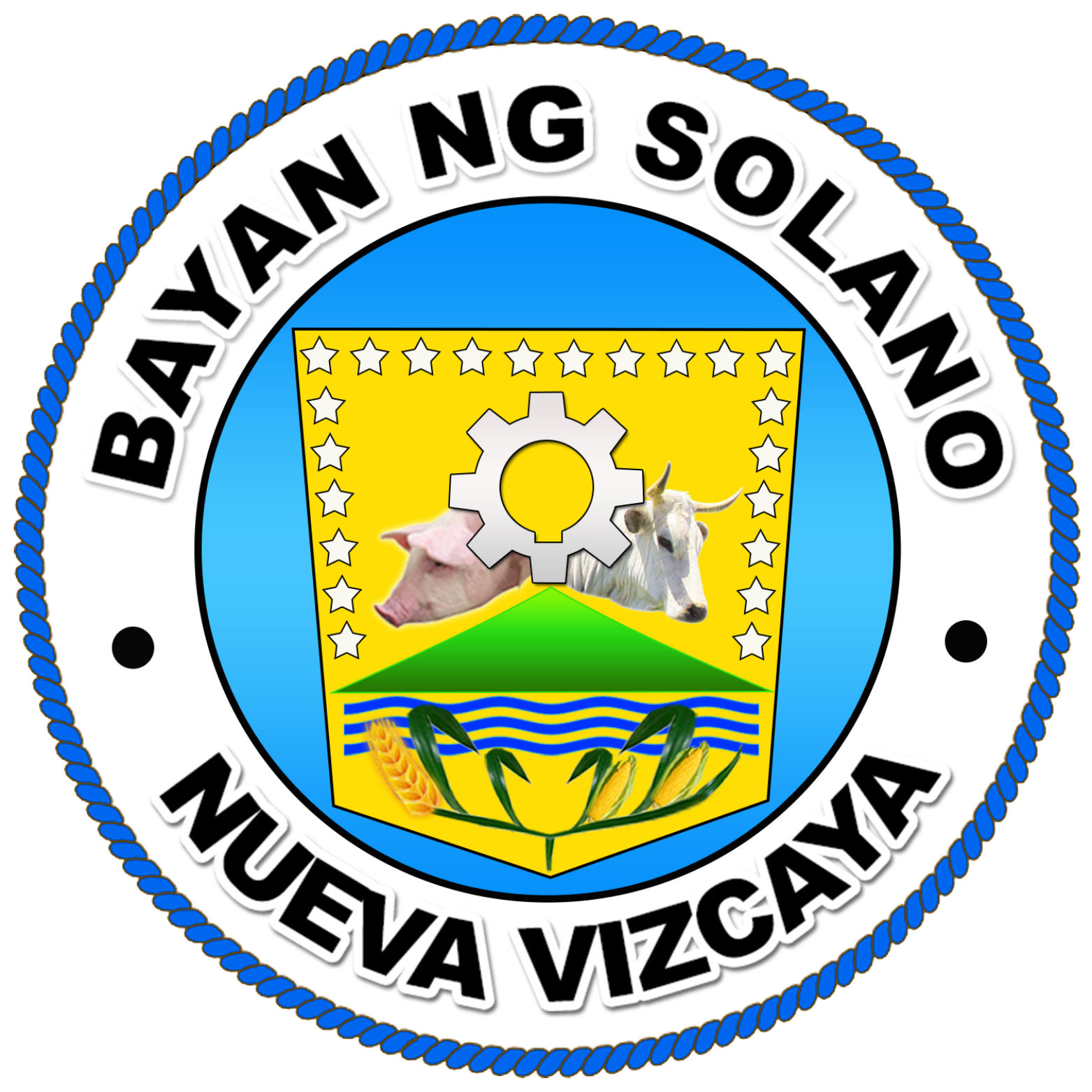
- Flag Seal
- Nicknames: Best of Vizcaya, Commercial and Financial Center of Nueva Vizcaya
- Motto: Keep on shining, and progressing!
- Anthem: Solano March
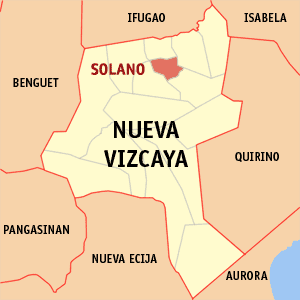
- Map of Nueva Vizcaya with Solano highlighted
- Interactive map of Solano
- Location within the Philippines
- Coordinates: 16°31′06″N 121°10′52″E
- Country: Philippines
- Region: Cagayan Valley
- Province: Nueva Vizcaya
- District: Lone district
- Founded: October 7, 1741
- Named for: Ramón María Solano y Llanderal
- Barangays: 22 (see Barangays)

Government
  - Type: Sangguniang Bayan
  - Mayor: Philip A. Dacayo
  - Vice Mayor: Eduardo D. Tiongson
  - Representative: Timothy Joseph Cayton (Aksyon)
  - Municipal Council: Members: Milady M. Dickson; Nezel C. Duque; Ma. Regina M. Valino-Valdez; Jerome G. Marcos; Ramon P. Ramento; Luisito L. Lannu; Michael D. Tiongson; Rudie R. Bueno
  - Electorate: 40,641 voters (2025)

Area
  - Total: 139.80 km^{2} (53.98 sq mi)
- Elevation: 273 m (896 ft)
- Highest elevation: 573 m (1,880 ft)
- Lowest elevation: 240 m (790 ft)

Population (2024 census)
  - Total: 69,296
  - Density: 495.68/km^{2} (1,283.8/sq mi)
  - Households: 18,887

Economy
  - Income class: 1st municipal income class
  - Poverty incidence: 3.28% (2023)
  - Revenue: ₱ 462.5 million (2024)
  - Assets: ₱ 1,173 million (2024)
  - Expenditure: ₱ 435.4 million (2024)
  - Liabilities: ₱ 151.6 million (2024)

Service provider
  - Electricity: Nueva Vizcaya Electric Cooperative (NUVELCO)
- Time zone: UTC+8 (PST)
- ZIP code: 3709
- PSGC: 0205013000
- IDD : area code: +63 (0)78
- Native languages: Gaddang; Ilocano; Tagalog
- Website: solano.gov.ph

Solano, officially the Municipality of Solano (Gaddang: Ili na Solano; Ilocano: Ili ti Solano; Tagalog: Bayan ng Solano), is a municipality in the province of Nueva Vizcaya, Philippines. According to the 2024 census, it has a population of 69,296 people.

According to 2021 data from the Bureau of Local Government Finance, Solano has the highest locally sourced revenue (LSR) of all the municipalities in Region 2 making it one of the notable economic hubs in Cagayan Valley. This further solidified the status of Solano as the undisputed premier town of Cagayan Valley.

== History ==
In 1760, the original name of the town was Bintauan, then a Gaddang settlement that is now a barangay of Villaverde. The town was later moved and formally founded in 1767 by Father Alejandro Vidal, a Dominican priest who led a Spanish mission. In 1768, it was called Lungabang, from the Gaddang word for cave, lungab. The name was later changed to Lumabang by the Spaniards for convenience. In 1851, Governor General Antonio Urbiztondo declared Lumabang a barrio of Bayombong for not having sufficient inhabitants and revenue to maintain itself. Governor General Ramon Solano y Llanderal authorized the separation of Lumabang as barrio from Bayombong. In 1853, the first Ilocanos arrived, brought by Don Diego Lumicao, a former gobernadorcillo. In 1889, it was renamed Solano, in honor of Governor General Ramon Solano y Llanderal.

The town was redeveloped by Father Juan Villaverde in 1889, and the poblacion consisted of 14 parallel wide streets, each having a width of 20 meters. Streets run from north to south and east to west, forming 100 square blocks with an aggregate area of one hectare per block. Solano was the largest municipality in the province until two of its barangays, Caliat and Bintawan, were separated to become the municipalities of Quezon and Villaverde respectively. The land area of Solano was correspondingly reduced to 13,980 hectares. In 1957, the barrios of Ibung and Bintawan were separated to form the town of Ibung, later renamed as Villaverde.

== Geography ==
Solano is situated 5.61 kilometres (3.49 mi) from the provincial capital Bayombong, and 298.01 kilometres (185.17 mi) from the country's capital city of Manila.

=== Barangays ===
Solano is politically subdivided into 22 barangays. Each barangay consists of puroks and some have sitios.

- Aggub
- Bagahabag
- Bangaan
- Bangar
- Bascaran
- Communal
- Concepcion (Calalabangan)
- Curifang (Sinafal)
- Dadap
- Lactawan
- Osmeña (Urban)
- Pilar D. Galima
- Poblacion North (Urban)
- Poblacion South (Urban)
- Quezon (Urban)
- Quirino (Urban)
- Roxas (Urban)
- San Juan
- San Luis
- Tucal
- Uddiawan
- Wacal

=== Climate ===
Climate data for Solano, Nueva Vizcaya
Month	Jan	Feb	Mar	Apr	May	Jun	Jul	Aug	Sep	Oct	Nov	Dec	Year
Mean daily maximum °C (°F)	24 (75)	26 (79)	28 (82)	31 (88)	31 (88)	30 (86)	29 (84)	29 (84)	29 (84)	28 (82)	26 (79)	24 (75)	28 (82)
Mean daily minimum °C (°F)	19 (66)	19 (66)	20 (68)	22 (72)	23 (73)	23 (73)	23 (73)	23 (73)	23 (73)	22 (72)	21 (70)	20 (68)	22 (71)
Average precipitation mm (inches)	119 (4.7)	83 (3.3)	54 (2.1)	37 (1.5)	133 (5.2)	132 (5.2)	161 (6.3)	163 (6.4)	153 (6.0)	142 (5.6)	160 (6.3)	224 (8.8)	1,561 (61.4)
Average rainy days	18.4	13.6	11.6	9.4	19.3	21.9	23.9	23.4	21.1	16.3	18.1	21.4	218.4
Source: Meteoblue

== Demographics ==
Population census of Solano

Year	Pop.	±% p.a.
1903	5,624	—
1918	7,563	+1.99%
1939	17,878	+4.18%
1948	19,840	+1.16%
1960	22,523	+1.06%
1970	27,032	+1.84%
1975	33,036	+4.10%
1980	36,710	+2.13%

Year	Pop.	±% p.a.
1990	44,246	+1.89%
1995	46,945	+1.12%
2000	52,391	+2.38%
2007	56,244	+0.98%
2010	56,134	−0.07%
2015	59,517	+1.12%
2020	65,287	+1.97%
2024	69,296	+1.44%

Source: Philippine Statistics Authority

== Economy ==
Poverty incidence of Solano (%)

Source: Philippine Statistics Authority

Solano is the main commercial and financial center of Nueva Vizcaya. It also has the most number of fast food restaurants in the province and has the most number of banks among the municipalities in the entire region with 25 banks. Major banks as well as rural and regional banks are based here.

== Government ==
=== Local government ===
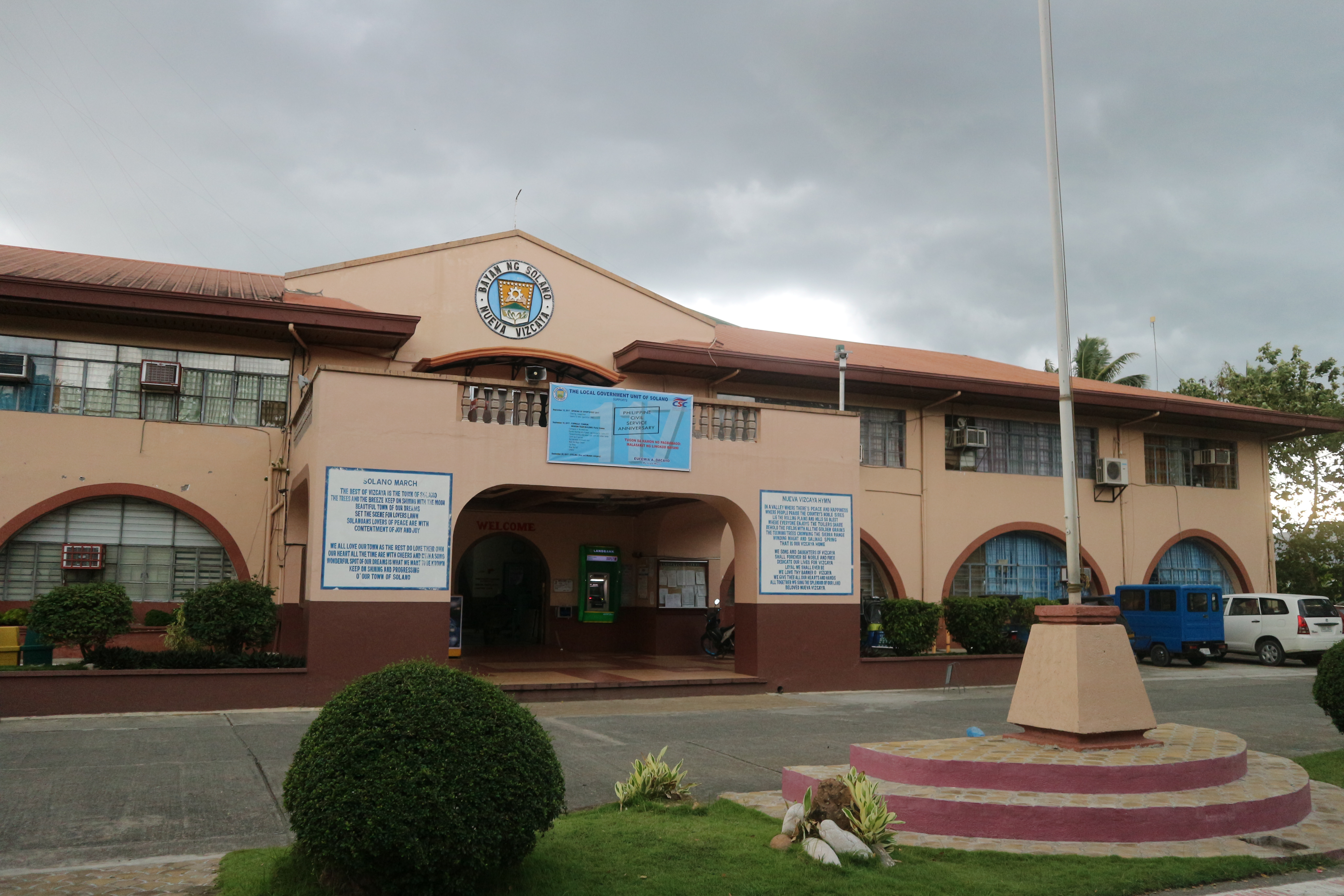
Solano Municipal Hall

Solano is part of the lone congressional district of the province of Nueva Vizcaya. It is governed by a mayor, designated as its local chief executive, and by a municipal council as its legislative body in accordance with the Local Government Code. The mayor, vice mayor, and the municipal councilors are elected directly in polls held every three years.

=== Elected officials ===
Members of the Municipal Council (2022–Present)
Position	Name
Representative	Atty. Timothy Joseph Cayton (Nueva Vizcaya Lone District)
Mayor	Atty. Philip A. Dacayo
Vice Mayor and Presiding Officer	Eduardo DL. Tiongson
Councilors	Thomas Dave C. Santos
Councilors	Clifford F. Tito
Councilors	Michael DL. Tiongson
Councilors	Walter D. Savedra Sr.
Councilors	Atty. Jerome G. Marcos
Councilors	Roland M. Carub
Councilors	Joseph T. Alindada
Councilors	Luisito L. Lannu
Sectoral Representatives	LnB Pres. Melchor E. Marzo
Sectoral Representatives	PPSK Pres. Isaac R. Divina
Sectoral Representatives	IPMR Leon G. Dumani

=== Local chief executives ===
==== Spanish-era heads of government ====
Under the Spanish regime, Solano (then Bintauan) was ruled by a gobernadorcillo, which was elected by the cabezas de barangay (barangay heads) which represented the survival of the earlier tribal organizations and were responsible for the tributes of their groups. The cabezas were originally hereditary, but, in time, it became elective. The electors of the gobernadorcillo were current or former heads of the barangay and after 3 years of service became eligible for the office.

The following list shows the gobernadorcillos, who had the honorary title "Don", during the Spanish regime from 1762 to 1898.

The following served as capitán del pueblo:

- 1762 Gatan
- 1763 Alianggang
- 1764 Danao Baccajan
- 1765 Alianggang
- 1766 Tomas Abbacan
- 1767 Felix Cadangan Sr.
- 1768 Antonio Binaley
- 1769 Sebastian Telan
- 1770 Domingo Buseg
- 1771 Luis Abbacan
- 1772 Mateo Guiguing
- 1773 Domingo Buseg
- 1774 Vicente Labog
- 1775 Bartolomé Bengao
- 1776 Bartolomé Bengao
- 1777 Luis Abbacan
- 1778 Santiago Dumelod

The next three years, the town head was to be known gobernadorcillo, and the position of capitan del pueblo was abolished.

- 1779 Antonio Dayag
- 1780 Vicente Labog
- 1781 Francisco Busa

The following served as alcaldes de naturales:

- 1782 Manuel Balassu
- 1783 Pedro Arasa
- 1784 Tomas Abbacan
- 1785 Clemente Malenab
- 1786 Tomas Lauagan
- 1787 Domingo Dumelod
- 1788 Santiago Agguid

On April 19, 1789, the alcalde mayor [of Cagayan] conveyed to the people the decree issued by the King of Spain ordering the restoration of the title gobernadorcillo.

- 1789 Pablo Saquing
- 1790 Domingo Panganiban
- 1791 Domingo Panganiban
- 1792 Domingo Dumelod
- 1793 Francisco Furuc Binaley
- 1794 Domingo Panganiban
- 1795 Vicente Labog
- 1796 Domingo Panganiban
- 1797 Raymundo Dinahum
- 1798 Vicente Pisang
- 1799 Domingo Panganiban
- 1800 Francisco Furuc Binaley
- 1801 Miguel Loggan
- 1802 Raymundo Dinahum
- 1803 Alberto Danguilan
- 1804 Miguel Mamuric
- 1805 Domingo Panganiban
- 1806 Jacinto Balauag
- 1807 Miguel Loggan
- 1808 Raymundo Dinahum
- 1809 Jacinto Balauag
- 1810 Vicente Pisang
- 1811 Jacinto Balauag
- 1812 Martín Lumicao
- 1813 Nicolás Alindayu
- 1814 Simon Danguilan
- 1815 Clemente Danguilan
- 1816 Antonio Danguilan
- 1817 Simon Danguilan
- 1818 Felipe Paracad
- 1819 Miguel Loggan
- 1820 Alejandro Cumiding
- 1821 Raymundo Dinahum
- 1822 José Pisang
- 1823 Antonio Danguilan
- 1824 Martín Lumicao
- 1825 Vicente Loggan
- 1826 Manuel Siggacao
- 1827 Martín Lumicao
- 1828 José Pisang
- 1829 Juan Guiab
- 1830 Miguel Panganiban
- 1831 Domingo Dinahum
- 1832 Clemente Danguilan
- 1833 José Pisang
- 1834 Jacinto Balauag
- 1835 Vicente Loggan
- 1836 Domingo Dinahum
- 1837 Clemente Danguilan
- 1838 Miguel Panganiban
- 1839 Ambrosio Loggan
- 1840 Enrique Balauag
- 1841 Dionisio Piggangay
- 1842 Clemente Danguilan
- 1843 José Pisang
- 1844 Justo Danguilan
- 1845 Domingo Dinahum
- 1846 Ambrosio Loggan
- 1847 Pedro Panganiban
- 1848 Diego Lumicao
- 1849 Enrique Balauag
- 1850 Pedro Panganiban

By executive order of 1851, Governor-General Antonio Urbiztondo, Marques de la Solana, declared Lumabang as a barrio of Bayombong, resulting in the office of gobernadorcillo becoming teniente del barrio.

- 1850 Gobernadorcillo Pedro Panganiban
- 1851 Teniente del Barrio Manuel Cutaran
- 1852 Teniente del Barrio Manuel Cutaran
- 1853 Teniente del Barrio Francisco Panganiban
- 1854 Teniente Del Barrio Félix Cadangan Jr.
- 1855 Teniente Del Barrio Florentino Valenciano
- 1856 Teniente Del Barrio Ambrosio Loggan

It was during this time when a new province, Isabela, was created, carving a portion of Nueva Vizcaya and a part of Cagayan. The new province was named in honor of Queen Isabella of Spain. The Governor of Nueva Vizcaya was Julian del Valle. The alcalde mayor of Cagayan came here for the purpose of this reorganization.

- 1857 Venido Loggan
- 1858 Domingo Esguerra
- 1859 Miguel Dumelod
- 1860 Miguel Loggan

General Ramon Solano y Llanderal authorized the separation of Lumabang as a barrio from Bayombong restoring the title of gobernadorcillo to Solano. From 1864, the term limit of the gobernadorcillo was extended from one year to two years

- 1860 Miguel Loggan
- 1861 Pedro Panganiban
- 1862 Enrique Balauag
- 1863 Venido Loggan
- 1864-65 Francisco Panganiban
- 1866-67 Vicente Saquing
- 1868-69 Santiago Ludan
- 1870-71 Miguel Loggan
- 1872-73 Francisco Panganiban
- 1874-75 Vicente Loggan
- 1876-77 Vicente Danguilan
- 1878-79 Francisco Panganiban
- 1880-81 Vicente Loggan
- 1882-83 Jacinto Loggan
- 1884 Francisco Binaley (died in office March 28, 1884)
- 1884-85 Antonio Dumelod
- 1886-87 Domingo Panganiban
- 1888-89 Domingo Ludan

In 1890, the establishment of the office of the justice of the peace was inaugurated in all the towns, and the first to assume this office in Solano was Domingo Panganiban who was in turn succeeded by Juan Sobrino, a Spaniard. who was succeeded by Sebastián Panganiban. who was then succeeded by Domingo Panganiban who held this office till 1898.

- 1890 Justice of the Peace Domingo Panganiban
- 1890 Justice of the Peace Juan Sobrino
- 1890 Justice of the Peace Sebastián Panganiban
- 1890-98 Justice of the Peace Domingo Panganiban
- 1890-91 Gobernadorcillo Antonio Dumelod
- 1892-93 Gobernadorcillo Domingo Loggan (replaced by Fernando Aggabao)
- 1894-95 Gobernadorcillo Sebastian Panganiban

It was during this time when the Royal Decree of the Central Government came, stopping the use of the title gobernadorcillo and in its stead capitán municipal was to be used. When Spanish colonial rule ended September 14, 1898, Solano was led by a teniente mayor.

- 1896-97 Capitán Municipal Sebastián Panganiban
- 1898 Teniente Mayor Felipe Lumicao

==== Municipal presidents ====
- 1899 Pedro Piggangay
- 1900 Herminigildo P. Soto
- 1901 Felipe Lumicao
- 1901 Pio Romero
- 1903-1909 Joaquín Velasquez
- 1910-1911 Lorenzo Manat
- 1912-1913 Justo Baniqued
- 1914-1915 Justo Balonkita
- 1916-1917 Doroteo Mondala
- 1918-1919 Joaquín Alayu
- 1920-1923 Julian Pinaroc
- 1923-1925 Tomas Lumicao
- 1926-1928 Felomino Sansano
- 1929-1931 Patricio Castillo
- 1932-1934 Mariano del Fiesta
- 1935-1938 Herminigildo P. Soto
- 1939-1940 Rufo Paras
- 1941 Nicomedes Castillo
- 1942 Victor Bobila
- 1943 Amado Logan
- 1944 Mariano del Fiesta

==== Mayors under Republican government ====
- 1945-1948 Domingo Lorenzo
- 1952-1954 José Espino
- 1955 Leodovico Pascial
- 1956-1963 Antonio Tottoc
- 1964-1966 Santiago M. Hermoso
- 1966-1967 Arsenio C. Lapitan
- 1968-1976 Osias D. Cadiente
- April 1976-April 1986 Pedro M. Tiongson
- April 1986-April 1987 Epifanio LD. Galima Jr.
- December 1987-February 1988 Roberto A. Balonkita
- February 1988-March 1992 Epifanio LD. Galima Jr.
- March 1992-June 1992 Menardo S. Mercado
- July 1992-June 1998 Heraldo D. Dacayo
- July 1998-June 2001 Epifanio LD. Galima Jr.
- July 2001-May 2004 Heraldo D. Dacayo
- May 2004-June 2004 Wilson D. Salas
- July 2004-June 2007 Santiago O. Dickson
- July 2007-June 2016 Philip A. Dacayo
- July 2016-2022 Eufemia A. Dacayo
- July 2022-Present Philip A. Dacayo

== Culture and tourism ==
The town's Pagbiagan Festival is celebrated every year of October 11. It coincides with Solano's founding anniversary, as well as the feast day of the town's patron Saint Louis Beltran. Through Presidential Proclamation 658, October 2, 2024 was declared a special non-working day to celebrate Solano Day and its 163rd Founding Anniversary highlighted by the Pagbiagan Festival 2024 that runs from September 29 to October 2.

Tourist attractions and sites of interest in Solano include:

- Communal Falls or Pikkan Falls
- Pa'id falls
- St. Louis Beltran Church, Giant Butaka (in front of the St. Louis Beltran Church)* Solano Museum (Saint Louis School Compound)
- Bell Tower and Poong Itim Na Nazareno Shrine also called Quiapo of the North (Beside the Louis Beltran Church)
- Hero's Park *World War II Cannon Relic (Across St. Louis Beltran Church)
- Municipal Hall and Garden

== Education ==
The Schools Division of Nueva Vizcaya governs the town's public education system. The division office is a field office of the DepEd in Cagayan Valley region. There are two schools district offices which govern all public and private elementary and high schools throughout the municipality. These are Solano I Schools District Office, and Solano II Schools District Office.

=== Primary and elementary schools ===
- Aggub Elementary School
- Aldersgate College - Elementary Department
- Bagahabag Elementary School
- Bangaan Elementary School
- Bangar Elementary School
- Bascaran Central School
- Bless Christian School
- Calaoagan Elementary School
- Concepcion Elementary School
- Curifang Elementary School
- Dadap Elementary School
- Isaiah Christian Academy of Solano, Inc.
- Kids Workshop Learning Center
- Lactawan Elementary School
- Pilar D. Galima Elementary School
- Saint Louis School - Elementary Department
- San Juan Elementary School
- San Luis Elementary School
- Solano East Central School
- Solano North Elementary School
- Solano South Central School
- Solano West Elementary School
- Tucal Elementary School
- Uddiawan Elementary School
- Wacal Elementary School

=== Secondary schools ===
- Aldersgate College - High School Department
- Bascaran National High School
- Dalton High School
- Solano High School
- Saint Louis School - High School Department
- Uddiawan National High School

=== Higher educational institutions ===
- Aldersgate College
- Cagayan Valley Maritime Studies
- Fuzeko Polytechnic College
- Solano Institute of Technology
- Nueva Vizcaya Caregiver Academy
- Niño Jesus de Praga Learning
- Saint Louis College of Solano Inc

== Media ==
=== AM station ===
- DWMG 1395 kHz (Vanguard Radio Network)

=== FM stations ===
- DWDC 101.3 BiGSOUNDfm (Vanguard Radio Network)
- DWNV 100.5 (Rural Airwaves Media Services-Unified Airwaves Network)

== Notable personalities ==
- Danilo Lim, army officer
- Hillarie Parungao, beauty pageant titleholder
- Jimboy Martin, actor, and rapper
- Jose Gambito, public official
- Marites Vitug, investigative journalist
- Romeo A. Brawner, public official
