= 2010 Philippine presidential election in Cavite =

- May 10, 2010

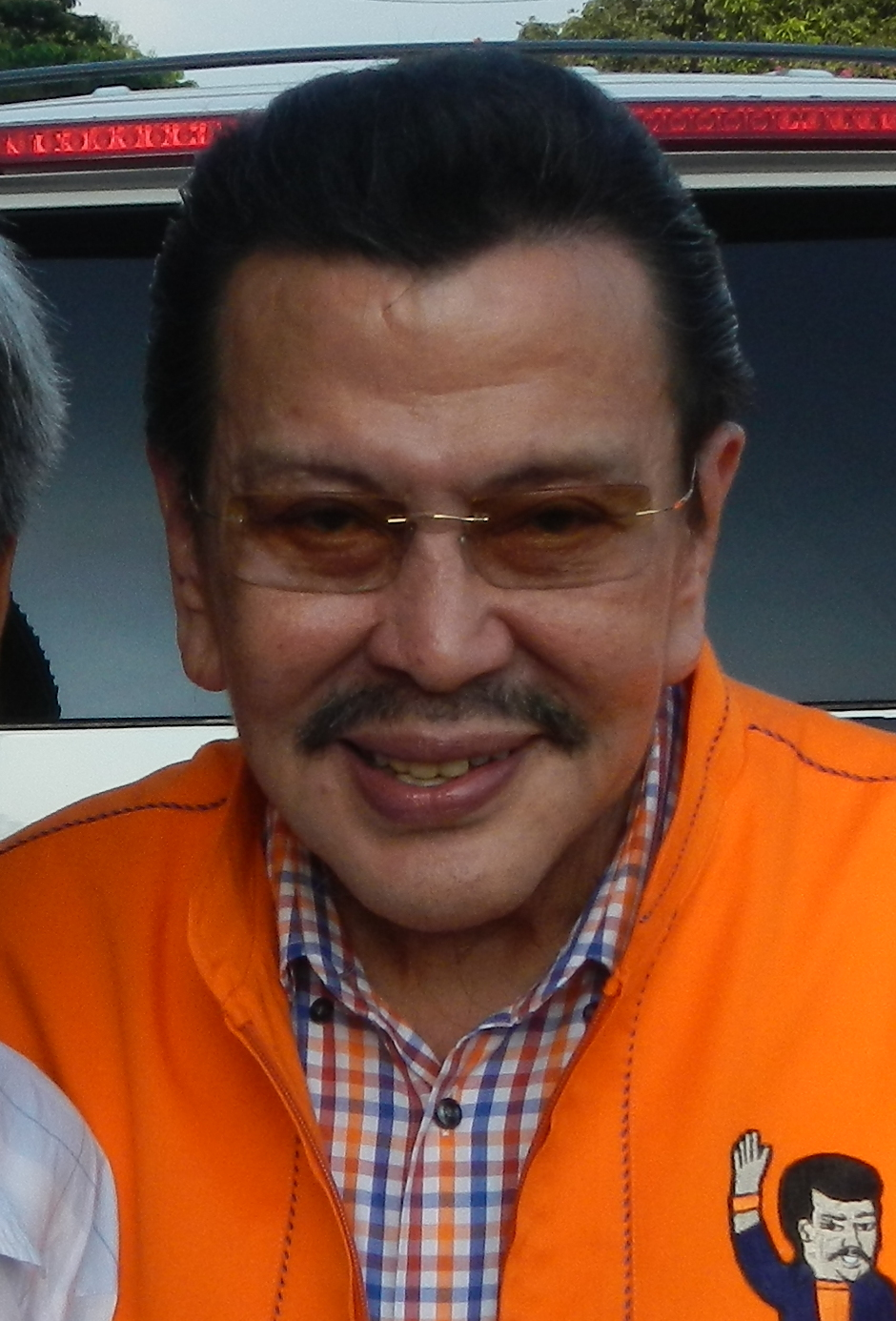

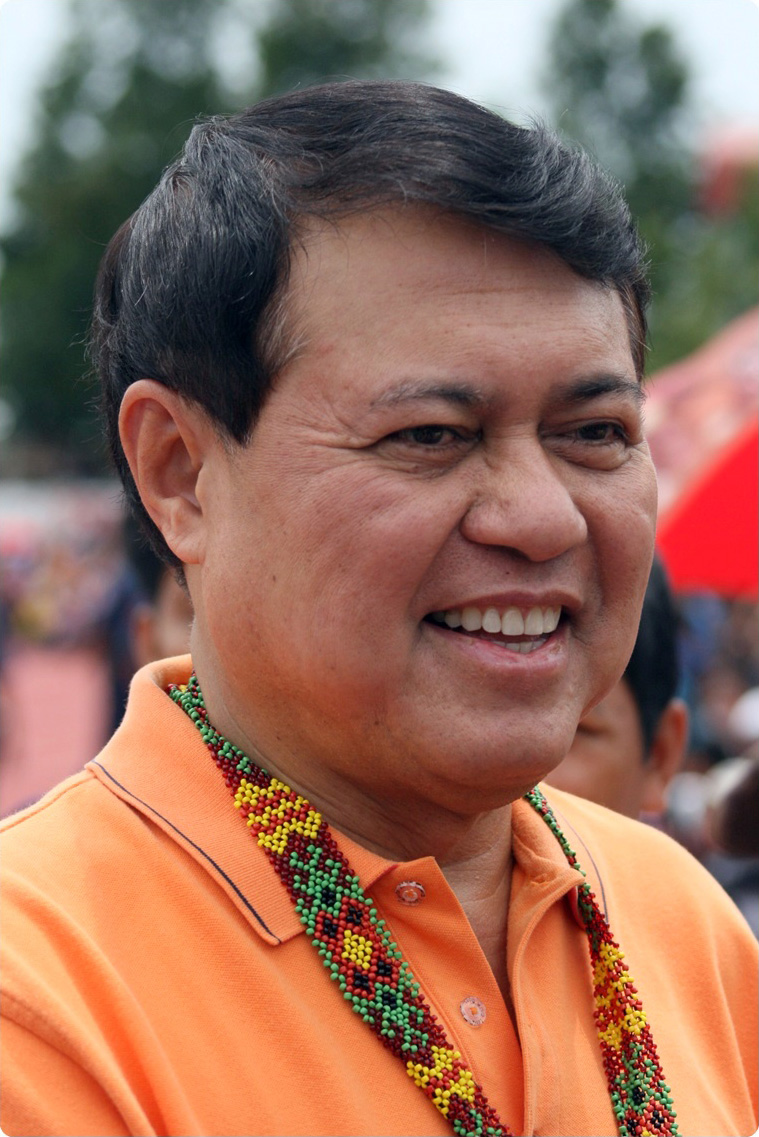
Candidate	Benigno Aquino III	Joseph Estrada	Manny Villar
Party	Liberal	PMP	Nacionalista
Running mate	Mar Roxas	Jejomar Binay	Loren Legarda
popular vote	492,328	310,422	116,604
Percentage	45.11%	28.45%	10.69%
President before election
Gloria Macapagal Arroyo
Lakas
Elected President
Benigno Aquino III
Liberal
- 2016 Philippine vice presidential election in Cavite
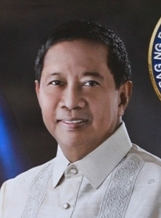

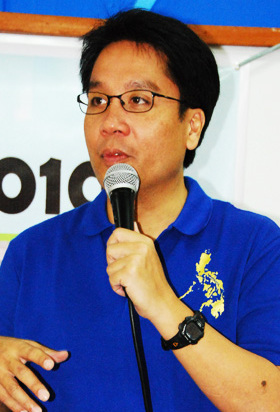
Candidate	Jejomar Binay	Mar Roxas
Party	PDP–Laban	Liberal
Popular vote	579,728	385,695
Percentage	53.45%	35.56%
Vice President before election
Noli de Castro
Independent
Elected Vice President
Jejomar Binay
PDP–Laban

The 2010 Philippine presidential and vice presidential elections in Cavite were held on Monday, May 10, 2010, as part of the 2010 Philippine general election in which all 80 provinces and hundreds of cities participated. Voters voted for the president and the vice president separately.

Senator and son of Ninoy and Corazon Aquino, Benigno Aquino III won the province of Cavite in a landslide against former president Joseph Estrada, Senate president Manny Villar, National Defense secretary Gilbert Teodoro, preacher Eddie Villanueva and others.

Makati mayor Jejomar Binay won the vice presidential race in the province also in a landslide against Senators Mar Roxas and Loren Legarda and others.

== Electoral system ==
According to the Constitution of the Philippines, the elections are held every six years after 1992, on the second Monday of May. The incumbent president is term limited and ineligible for re-election. The incumbent vice president is eligible to run for re-election and may run for two consecutive terms. The plurality voting system is used to determine the winner: the candidate with the highest number of votes, whether or not one has a majority, wins the presidency. The vice presidential election is a separate election, is held on the same rules, and voters may split their ticket. Both winners will serve six-year terms commencing on the noon of June 30, 2010, and ending on the same day six years later.

== Candidates ==
List of Presidential and Vice Presidential candidates on the ballot
#	Candidate (For President)	Party	#	Candidate (For Vice President/Running Mate)	Party
1.	Vetellano Acosta (disqualified)	KBL	7.	Jay Sonza	KBL
2.	Benigno Aquino III	Liberal	6.	Mar Roxas	Liberal
3.	John Carlos de los Reyes	Ang Kapatiran	2.	Dominador Chipeco Jr.	Ang Kapatiran
4.	Joseph Estrada	PMP	1.	Jejomar Binay	PDP–Laban
5.	Dick Gordon	Bagumbayan	3.	Bayani Fernando	Bagumbayan
6.	Jamby Madrigal	Independent		None	None
7.	Nicanor Perlas	Independent		None	None
8.	Gilbert Teodoro	Lakas	5.	Edu Manzano	Lakas
9.	Eddie Villanueva	Bangon Pilipinas	8.	Perfecto Yasay Jr.	Bangon Pilipinas
10.	Manny Villar	Nacionalista	4.	Loren Legarda	NPC

== Results ==
=== Presidential result ===
2010 Philippine presidential election results in Cavite (Note: The 2,650 votes for Vetellano Acosta are not listed here as they are deemed Invalid.)
Party	Candidate	Votes	%
Liberal	Benigno Aquino III	492,328	45.11%
PMP	Joseph Estrada	310,422	28.45%
Nacionalista	Manny Villar	116,604	10.69%
Lakas	Gilberto Teodoro	91,052	8.34%
Bangon Pilipinas	Eddie Villanueva	52,047	4.77%
Bagumbayan	Dick Gordon	24,633	2.26%
Independent	Jamby Madrigal	1,645	0.15%
Independent	Nicanor Perlas	1,469	0.13%
Ang Kapatiran	John Carlos de los Reyes	1,080	0.10%
Total votes		1,091,280	100.00%

=== Vice presidential result ===
2010 Philippine vice presidential election results in Cavite
Party	Candidate	Votes	%
PDP–Laban	Jejomar Binay	579,728	53.45%
Liberal	Mar Roxas	385,695	35.56%
NPC	Loren Legarda	61,832	5.70%
Bagumbayan	Bayani Fernando	30,595	2.82%
Bangon Pilipinas	Perfecto Yasay Jr.	16,945	1.56%
Lakas	Edu Manzano	7,233	0.67%
KBL	Jay Sonza	1,865	0.17%
Ang Kapatiran	Dominador Chipeco Jr.	766	0.07%
Total votes		1,084,659	100.00%
