= 2013 Philippine general election =

- May 13, 2013
- Registered: 52,982,173
- Turnout: 40,144,207 (75.77% ▲1.43pp from 2019)
- 2013 Philippine Senate election
- May 13, 2013

12 (of the 24) seats to the Senate of the Philippines 13 seats needed for a majority
Alliance	Team PNoy	UNA
Seats won	9	3
Popular vote	175,716,460	90,808,675
Percentage	59.63%	30.82%
Senate President before election
Juan Ponce Enrile
UNA
Elected Senate President
Franklin Drilon
Liberal
- 2013 Philippine House of Representatives elections
- May 13, 2013
- All 293 seats in the House of Representatives of the Philippines; 147 seats needed for a majority
Party	Vote %	Seats	+/–
Liberal	37.56	109	+62
NPC	17.08	42	+13
UNA	11.17	8	+8
NUP	8.55	24	+24
Nacionalista	8.41	18	−7
Lakas	5.24	14	−92
Others	9.18	19	+7
Party-list	—	59	+2
This lists parties that won seats. See the complete results below.
Speaker before	Speaker after
Feliciano Belmonte, Jr. Liberal	Feliciano Belmonte, Jr. Liberal

A general election was held in the Philippines on May 13, 2013. It was a midterm election—the officials elected were sworn in on June 30, 2013, midway through President Benigno Aquino III's term of office.

Being elected are 12 senators (half of the Senate), and all 229 district members of the House of Representatives. These national elections were held on the same day as local and gubernatorial elections, as well as a general election in the Autonomous Region in Muslim Mindanao. In total, there were 18,022 national and local positions up for election.

Barangay officials, including barangay captains, were elected on October 28, 2013. The elections for SK officials were held at the same day, but on September 24, 2013, the Congress of the Philippines voted to postpone of the election for at least a year.

== Preparations ==
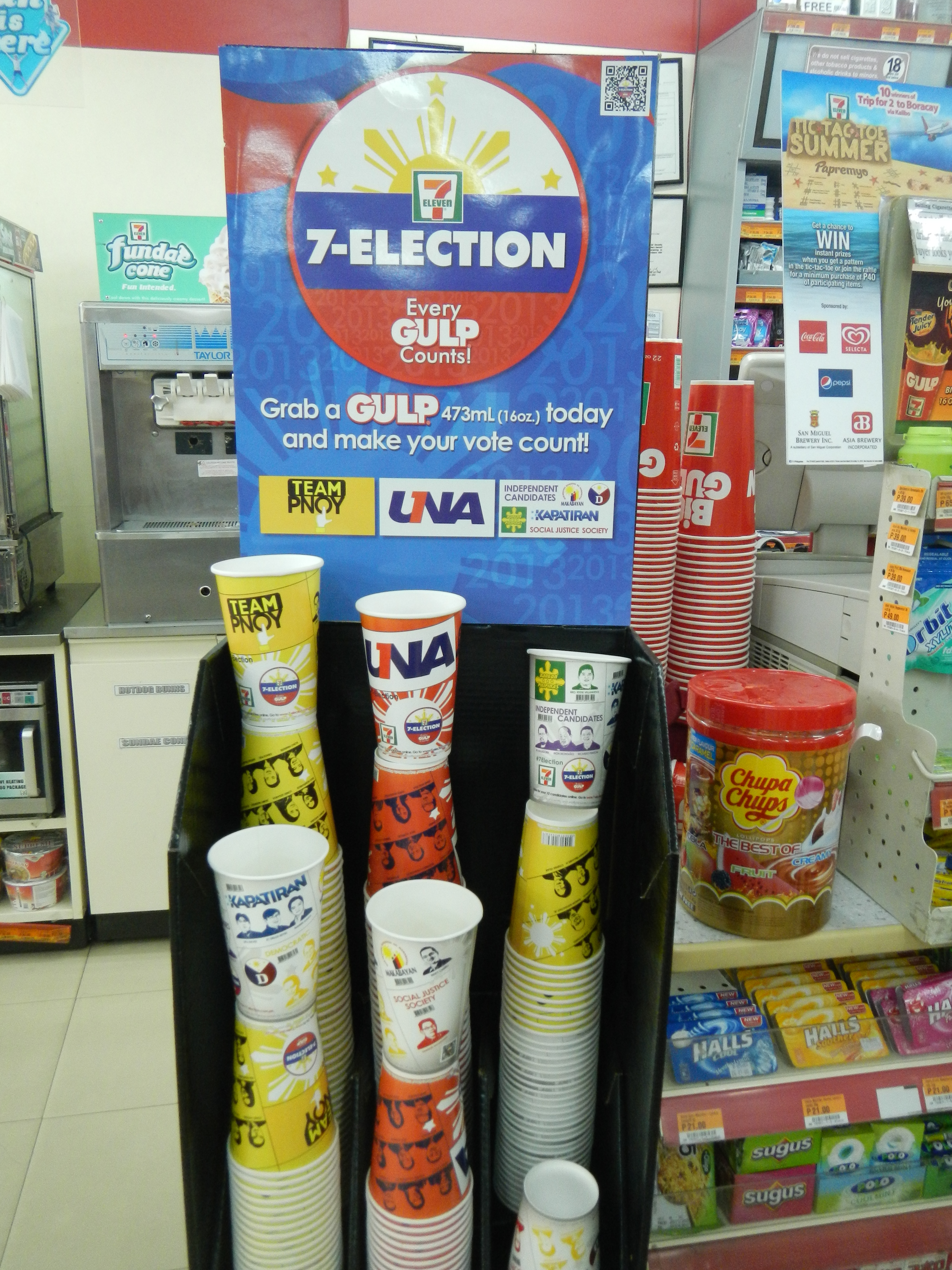
7-Eleven in Baliuag, Bulacan, offering customers a chance to show support for a coalition.

=== Registration of voters and candidates ===
The Commission on Elections (COMELEC) ended the year-long registration of new voters and voters transferring residences nationwide, apart from the general registration of voters in the Autonomous Region in Muslim Mindanao (ARMM) on October 31, 2012. Due to the commission not allowing an extension of registration, COMELEC offices nationwide were swamped with people on the last day of registration, although the process was mostly peaceful.

The COMELEC held a week-long separate registration for prospective candidates starting from October 1. The commission is expected to release a final list of candidates by October 6. Candidates running for the Senate should file certificates of candidacies at the commission's main office at Intramuros, while those running for the other positions should file at their local COMELEC offices.

The commission completed the cleansing of the voters list in the ARMM, rejecting 236,489 names. Most were either double registrants or were too young to vote.

=== Absentee voting ===
Registered voters who are members of the military, police, civil service and media who cannot vote at their voting precincts on election day may opt to register for local absentee voting.

==== Overseas ====
The commission removed 238,557 overseas absentee voters from the voters' list after failing to manifest their intention to vote. Out of about 915,000 overseas voters, more than 200,000 had not voted in two preceding elections and were sent notices; only 29 replied and were not removed from the voters' list. However, after being slammed by the overseas Filipinos on their disenfranchisement, the commission reinstated the 238,557 overseas absentee voters; they also extended the deadline for the period of filing of the manifestation of intent to vote until election day itself. Overseas absentee voting started on April 13, and continued until election day. Depending on the diplomatic mission, a voter may vote personally or via the mail, and via manually or via the automated system. Voting in Saudi Arabia began on April 16 after the Saudi customs refused to release the voting paraphernalia in time for April 13.

==== Local ====
Members of the police, military, members of the civil service and the media who had previously registered for local absentee voting voted for the Senate and party-list elections from April 28 to 30. Those which failed to vote at this period are still eligible to vote on election day itself. Out of the 18,332 voters that registered, 12,732 were found to be qualified by the commission and were allowed to vote. However, the commission said that the turnout was low; chairman Sixto Brillantes rued the low turnout, pointing out that the election was not on a presidential election year as the cause.

=== Campaigning ===
On January 13, the election period began. This allowed the commission to impose prohibitions on 24 activities, including a nationwide ban on guns and other deadly weapons on that day.

The commission released regulations on online campaigning on January 16. The COMELEC resolution stipulated that online propaganda can only be published on a website thrice a week, and allows advertisements in the form of pop-ups, banners and the like. Campaigning via social websites such as Twitter and Facebook would not be regulated. This is the first election the commission has regulated online campaigning. The commission dramatically reduced the amount of airtime candidates and parties can use during the campaign period. Previously, the commission imposed a 120-minute airtime limit on every TV station and 180 minutes on radio stations; for 2013, the commission capped the cumulative airtime to 120 minutes on TV and 180 minutes on radio for all networks. This was a reversion on the 2004, 2007 and 2010 elections, and returned to the original 2001 limit. The Fair Elections Act was not clear on whether the 120 minutes for TV and 180 minutes for radio were for every station or for all stations.

The commission, in a cost-saving measure, announced on January 18 that they ruled to use plastic seals with serial numbers instead of padlocks in securing ballot boxes. Chairman Sixto Brillantes remarked that padlocks are bulky and expensive, as compared to plastic seals cannot be tampered with and are cheaper. The commission expects to save more than 50% if plastic seals will be used; plastic seals would cost the commission P14 million, while padlocks would have cost them P34.2 million. The commission also announced that voters would no longer place their thumbprints on the ballot; instead signatures would be used.

On January 23, the commission announced that it will be regulating the use of political colors, logos and insignias during the campaign. It monitored television personalities on whether they are being paid to wear colors that are connected to certain candidates. The commission also imposed a right of reply provision, that would give equal time and space for charges against candidates. This was also the first time the commission imposed the rule; the rule has been heavily opposed by the press, but Commission Rene Sarmiento said the rule balances the freedom of expression and public interest.

On mid-April, the Supreme Court issued a temporary restraining order on limiting the airtime of political advertisements by candidates by the Commission on Elections. Voting 9–6, the high court favored the petition by Team PNoy senatorial candidate Alan Peter Cayetano to halt the implementation of Resolution No. 9615 and its amendment, Resolution No. 9631. The airtime limit presently stands at an aggregate of 120 minutes in all TV networks and 180 minutes in all radio stations for all national candidates and an aggregate of 60 minutes in all TV networks and 90 minutes in all radio stations for all local candidates. Sixto Brillantes, dismayed and the high court rulings adverse to the election commission threatened to resign but later relented after a meeting with President Aquino.

=== Source code ===
Smartmatic, the source of the machines that were used in the automated elections, is embroiled in a dispute with Dominion Voting Systems over the ownership of the software that were used by the machines. This source code is mandated to be released by law. By early April, chairman Sixto Brillantes said that the deal to release the source was "97 percent" of being completed. However, on late April, Brillantes said that "I’m no longer interested because it’s too late already. Election day is so close and even if they give us the source code now, it can no longer be reviewed for lack of time." Brillantes assured the public that despite the nonexistence of the source code, the machines can still work via the binary code. On early May, senatorial candidate Richard Gordon petitioned to the Supreme Court the commission to order the latter to reveal the source code to local review groups. Gordon, who authored the law mandating the automated elections, said that the commission does not have the discretion on whether or not political parties can review the source code.

A few days after Gordon's petition, or exactly a week before the election, Brillantes announced that Smartmatic and Dominion signed an agreement releasing the source code, and that it would be presented to the public on May 8. Critics scored that the late release of the source code is not possible with only a few days remaining before the elections. On May 9, Dominion turned the source code, which was in a CD, to the commission. Dominion, the commission and SLI Global Solutions, which had certified the source code months earlier, encrypted the source code on a computer provided by the commission. The source code was then burned anew to a separate CD-R, placed inside a safety box, and was delivered to the Bangko Sentral ng Pilipinas to be kept in a vault.

=== Bans ===
==== Gun ban ====
The commission issued a nationwide gun ban that started on January 13, and will last for five months, until June 12, 2013, or a month after the election. By April 19, the number of violations to the gun ban was at 2,053.

==== Liquor ban ====
The commission also issued an "expanded" liquor ban: instead of banning intoxicating substances on election day and election eve, the commission included the four days preceding the election. Foreigners and certain hotels and similar establishments were exempted. However, the Supreme Court of the Philippines issued a restraining order reverting to the two-day liquor ban after it upheld a petition by the Food and Beverage Inc. and International Wines and Spirits Association. The commission then withdrew its resolution instituting the five-day liquor ban, reverting the ban to two days as originally intended by law.

==== Money ban ====
In order to curb vote buying, the commission issued a resolution prohibiting bank withdrawals of more than 100,000 pesos. However, Secretary of Justice Leila de Lima expressed reservations on the constitutionality of the so-called "money ban", and the Bangko Sentral ng Pilipinas has explicitly stated that it would not comply with the commission's resolution.

The commission subsequently released a supplemental resolution amending the "money ban", which gives the banks the discretion on whether to allow bank withdrawals or not. However, the Supreme Court issued a status quo ante order against the "money ban", acting upon a petition by the Bankers Association of the Philippines.

== Candidates ==
=== Team PNoy ===
Team PNoy ticket
#	Name	Party
2.	Sonny Angara	LDP
3.	Bam Aquino	Liberal
7.	Alan Peter Cayetano	Nacionalista
13.	Francis Escudero	Independent
18.	Risa Hontiveros	Akbayan
19.	Loren Legarda	NPC
22.	Jamby Madrigal	Liberal
24.	Ramon Magsaysay Jr.	Liberal
27.	Koko Pimentel	PDP–Laban
28.	Grace Poe	Independent
30.	Antonio Trillanes	Nacionalista
32.	Cynthia Villar	Nacionalista

=== United Nationalist Alliance ===
United Nationalist Alliance
#	Name	Party
5.	Nancy Binay	UNA
8.	Tingting Cojuangco	UNA
11.	JV Ejercito	UNA
12.	Jack Enrile	NPC
15.	Dick Gordon	UNA
17.	Gregorio Honasan	UNA
21.	Ernesto Maceda	UNA
23.	Mitos Magsaysay	UNA
33.	Migz Zubiri	UNA

=== Makabayan Bloc ===
Makabayan ticket
#	Name	Party
6.	Teodoro Casiño	Makabayan
13.	Francis Escudero*	Independent
19.	Loren Legarda*	NPC
27.	Koko Pimentel*	PDP–Laban
28.	Grace Poe*	Independent
32.	Cynthia Villar*	Nacionalista

*Guest candidate

=== Ang Kapatiran ===
Ang Kapatiran ticket
#	Name	Party
9.	Rizalito David	Ang Kapatiran
10.	John Carlos de los Reyes	Ang Kapatiran
20.	Marwil Llasos	Ang Kapatiran

=== Democratic Party of the Philippines ===
DPP ticket
#	Name	Party
4.	Greco Belgica	DPP
14.	Baldomero Falcone	DPP
29.	Christian Señeres	DPP

=== Others ===
Non-independents not in tickets
#	Name	Party
1.	Samson Alcantara	Social Justice Society
16.	Edward Hagedorn	Independent
25.	Ramon Montaño	Independent
26.	Ricardo Penson	Independent
31.	Eddie Villanueva	Bangon Pilipinas

== Results ==
Polls opened at 7:00 and there were over 52 million eligible voters to vote for the more than 18,000 positions. In addition, police and military forces were put on higher alert for expectations of violence which had resulted in about 60 deaths since campaigning began.

=== Congress ===
The congressmen elected in 2013, together with those senators elected in the 2010 elections, shall comprise the 16th Congress of the Philippines.

==== Senate ====
Representation of results; seats contested are inside the box. Nacionalista Party UNA Liberal Party Lakas NPC LDP PDP–Laban PRP Independent

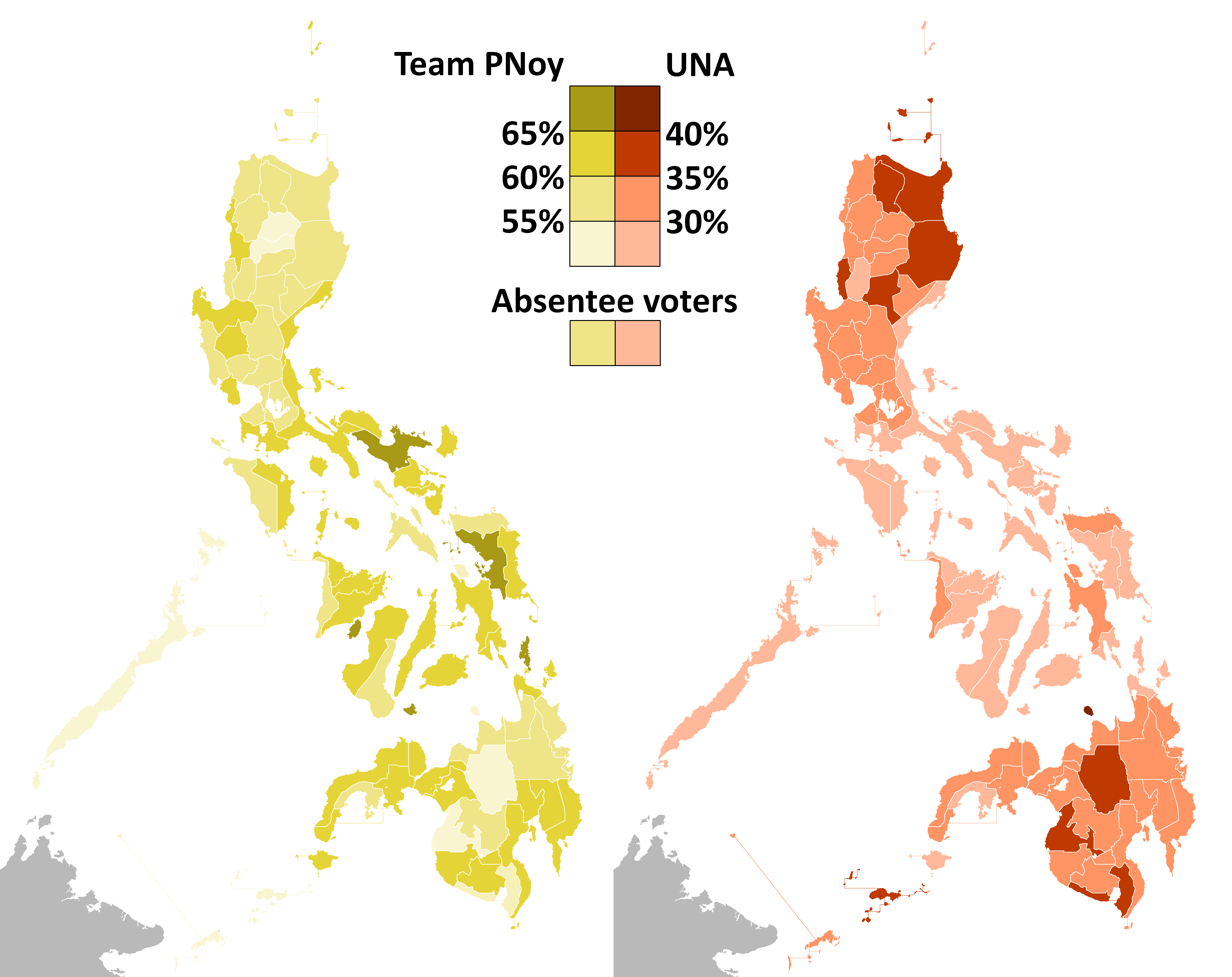
Proportion of votes garnered by each slate per province and some cities.

Twelve of the 24 seats in the Senate, or the seats up in odd-numbered years, are up for election, including the seat vacated in 2010 by the current president, Benigno Aquino III. Elections to the Senate are via plurality-at-large voting: the voter having 12 votes per candidate, and the candidates with the 12 highest number of votes being elected.

Candidate	Party or alliance		Votes	%
Grace Poe	Team PNoy (Note: Guest candidate of Makabayan)	Independent	20,337,327	50.66
Loren Legarda	Team PNoy	Nationalist People's Coalition	18,661,196	46.49
Alan Peter Cayetano	Team PNoy	Nacionalista Party	17,580,813	43.79
Francis Escudero	Team PNoy	Independent	17,502,358	43.60
Nancy Binay	United Nationalist Alliance		16,812,148	41.88
Sonny Angara	Team PNoy	Laban ng Demokratikong Pilipino	16,005,564	39.87
Bam Aquino	Team PNoy	Liberal Party	15,534,465	38.70
Koko Pimentel	Team PNoy	PDP–Laban	14,725,114	36.68
Antonio Trillanes	Team PNoy	Nacionalista Party	14,127,722	35.19
Cynthia Villar	Team PNoy	Nacionalista Party	13,822,854	34.43
JV Ejercito	United Nationalist Alliance		13,684,736	34.09
Gregorio Honasan	United Nationalist Alliance		13,211,424	32.91
Dick Gordon	United Nationalist Alliance		12,501,991	31.14
Juan Miguel Zubiri	United Nationalist Alliance		11,821,134	29.45
Jack Enrile	United Nationalist Alliance	Nationalist People's Coalition	11,543,024	28.75
Ramon Magsaysay Jr.	Team PNoy	Liberal Party	11,356,739	28.29
Risa Hontiveros	Team PNoy	Akbayan	10,944,843	27.26
Edward Hagedorn	Independent		8,412,840	20.96
Eddie Villanueva	Bangon Pilipinas		6,932,985	17.27
Jamby Madrigal	Team PNoy	Liberal Party	6,787,744	16.91
Mitos Magsaysay	United Nationalist Alliance		5,620,429	14.00
Teodoro Casiño	Makabayan		4,295,151	10.70
Ernesto Maceda	United Nationalist Alliance		3,453,121	8.60
Tingting Cojuangco	United Nationalist Alliance		3,152,939	7.85
Samson Alcantara	Social Justice Society		1,240,104	3.09
John Carlos de los Reyes	Ang Kapatiran		1,238,280	3.08
Greco Belgica	Democratic Party of the Philippines		1,128,924	2.81
Ricardo Penson	Independent		1,040,293	2.59
Ramon Montaño	Independent		1,040,131	2.59
Rizalito David	Ang Kapatiran		1,035,971	2.58
Christian Señeres	Democratic Party of the Philippines		706,198	1.76
Marwil Llasos	Ang Kapatiran		701,390	1.75
Baldomero Falcone	Democratic Party of the Philippines		665,845	1.66
Total			297,625,797	100.00
Total votes			40,144,207	–
Registered voters/turnout			52,982,173	75.77
Source: COMELEC

==== House of Representatives ====
All 292 seats in the House of Representatives are up. A voter had two votes in the House of Representatives elections: one for party-list representatives, which shall comprise at most 20% of the seats, and another for district representatives, which shall comprise the rest of the seats.

===== District elections =====
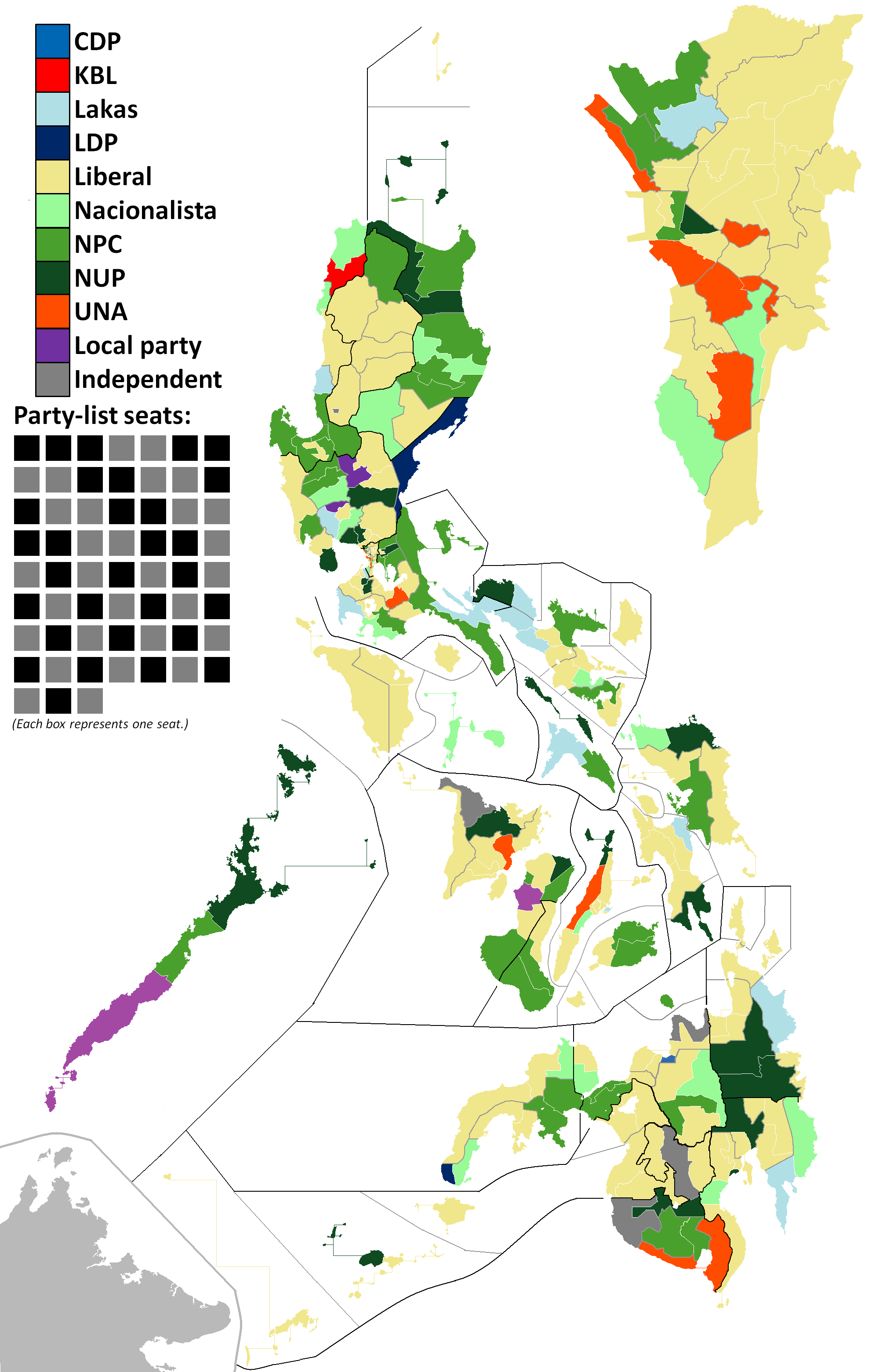
Election results per district.

Elections are via first past the post system: the candidate with the highest number of votes wins that district's seat in the House of Representatives. There are 234 seats to be disputed.

Party	Votes	%	+/–	Seats	+/–
Liberal Party	10,557,265	37.56	+18.38	109	+62
Nationalist People's Coalition	4,800,907	17.08	+1.40	42	+13
United Nationalist Alliance	3,140,381	11.17	New	8	New
National Unity Party	2,402,097	8.55	New	24	New
Nacionalista Party	2,364,400	8.41	−2.79	18	−7
Lakas–CMD	1,472,464	5.24	−32.09	14	−92
PDP–Laban	281,320	1.00	+0.29	0	−2
Pwersa ng Masang Pilipino	144,030	0.51	+1.98	0	−4
Bukidnon Paglaum	100,405	0.36	New	1	New
Aksyon Demokratiko	97,982	0.35	−0.09	0	0
Kambilan ning Memalen Kapampangan	96,433	0.34	New	1	New
Kabalikat ng Bayan sa Kaunlaran	94,966	0.34	+0.14	1	0
Unang Sigaw	94,952	0.34	New	1	New
Kilusang Bagong Lipunan	94,484	0.34	−0.12	1	0
United Negros Alliance	91,467	0.33	New	1	New
Laban ng Demokratikong Pilipino	90,070	0.32	−0.15	2	0
Kusug Agusanon	71,436	0.25	New	1	New
Hugpong sa Tawong Lungsod	65,324	0.23	New	0	0
Centrist Democratic Party of the Philippines	68,281	0.24	New	1	New
Sulong Zambales	60,280	0.21	New	0	0
Partidong Pagbabago ng Palawan	57,485	0.20	New	1	New
Kapayapaan, Kaunlaran at Katarungan	54,425	0.19	+0.16	0	0
Akbayan	34,239	0.12	New	1	New
Partido Magdiwang	23,253	0.08	−0.01	1	0
One Cebu	21,936	0.08	New	0	0
Ang Kapatiran	19,019	0.07	−0.01	0	0
Adelante Zamboanga Party	15,881	0.06	New	0	0
Partido ng Manggagawa at Magsasaka	10,396	0.04	−2.59	0	−1
Partido Lakas ng Masa	10,196	0.04	New	0	0
Makabayan	3,870	0.01	New	0	0
Ompia Party	1,682	0.01	New	0	0
Democratic Party of the Philippines	1,071	0.00	New	0	0
Independent	1,665,324	5.92	−0.93	6	−1
Party-list seats (Note: Originally, only 58 seats were up in the party-list election. An additional seat was then seated, then two seats were ultimately not seated until the end of the congressional term.)				59	+2
Total	28,107,721	100.00	–	293	+7
Valid votes	28,107,721	70.02	−19.45		
Invalid/blank votes	12,036,486	29.98	+19.45		
Total votes	40,144,207	–	–		
Registered voters/turnout	52,014,648	77.18	+2.84		

===== Party-list election =====
Elections are via a closed list modified Hare quota system with a 2% election threshold. A voter may vote for one party. The parties are then ranked in descending order of votes. In the first round of seat allocation, the parties that win at least 2% of the vote win one seat each. In the second round, the remaining seats are distributed via the Hare quota, with remainders disregarded; however, a party may not win more than three seats. If the number of seats that are already distributed does not equal the number of seats reserved for party-list representatives, one seat shall be awarded to every party that did not win seats in the second round, including parties that did not surpass the 2% threshold, until the seats reserved for party-list representatives are filled up.

Major parties are prohibited from running in the party-list election, which was instituted to allow marginalized sectors of society to join the political process. With 234 district seats, and party-list seats should comprise at most 20% of the seats, there were 58 seats up for election

Party	Votes	%	+/–	Seats	+/–
Buhay Hayaan Yumabong	1,270,608	4.59	+0.33	3	+1
A Teacher Partylist	1,042,863	3.77	+1.66	2	0
Bayan Muna	954,724	3.45	+0.90	2	0
1st Consumers Alliance for Rural Energy	934,915	3.38	+0.75	2	0
Akbayan	829,149	2.99	−0.62	2	0
Abono	768,265	2.77	+0.16	2	0
Ako Bicol Political Party	763,316	2.76	−2.44	2	−1
OFW Family Club	752,229	2.72	New	2	New
Gabriela Women's Party	715,250	2.58	−0.84	2	0
Coalition of Association of Senior Citizens in the Philippines	679,168	2.45	−1.96	2	0
Cooperative NATCCO Network Party	642,005	2.32	−0.90	2	0
Agricultural Sector Alliance of the Philippines	592,463	2.14	+0.38	2	+1
Citizens' Battle Against Corruption	584,906	2.11	−0.11	2	0
Magdalo para sa Pilipino	567,426	2.05	New	2	New
An Waray (Note: An Waray was initially entitled to two seats following the 2013 election. However after a re-computation ordered by the Supreme Court it was determined that An Waray only secured one seat. Victoria Noel assumed position as An Waray's second representative without a proclamation from the Commission on Elections.)	541,205	1.95	−0.47	1	−1
Abante Mindanao	466,114	1.68	+0.40	1	0
ACT Teachers	454,346	1.64	+0.37	1	0
Butil Farmers Party	439,557	1.59	−0.14	1	0
Anak Mindanao	382,267	1.38	+0.83	1	New
Anti-Crime and Terrorism Community Involvement and Support	377,165	1.36	+1.37	1	New
Kalinga-Advocacy for Social Empowerment and Nation-Building Through Easing Poverty	372,383	1.34	−0.56	1	0
LPG Marketers Association	370,897	1.34	−0.09	1	0
Trade Union Congress Party	369,286	1.33	+0.50	1	0
You against Corruption and Poverty	366,621	1.32	+0.18	1	0
Agri-Agra na Reforma para sa Magsasaka ng Pilipinas Movement	366,170	1.32	+1.16	1	New
Angkla: Ang Partido ng mga Pilipinong Marino	360,497	1.30	New	1	New
Arts Business and Science Professionals	359,587	1.30	+0.42	1	0
Democratic Independent Workers Association	341,820	1.23	+0.42	1	0
Kabataan	341,292	1.23	−0.19	1	0
Anakpawis	321,745	1.16	−0.37	1	0
Alay Buhay Community Development Foundation	317,355	1.15	+0.59	1	0
Ang Asosasyon Sang Mangunguma Nga Bisaya-Owa Mangunguma	312,312	1.13	−0.09	1	0
Social Amelioration & Genuine Intervention on Poverty	287,739	1.04	New	1	New
Alliance of Volunteer Educators	270,431	0.98	+0.24	1	0
Adhikaing Tinataguyod ng Kooperatiba	267,763	0.97	+0.37	1	0
Abang Lingkod	260,923	0.94	+0.83	1	New
1 Banat & Ahapo Coalition	245,529	0.89	New	1	New
Abakada Guro	244,754	0.88	+0.56	1	New
Ang Mata'y Alagaan	244,026	0.88	+0.67	1	New
Ang Nars	243,360	0.88	New	1	New
Ang National Coalition of Indigenous Peoples Action Na	241,505	0.87	New	1	New
Agbiag! Timpuyog Ilocano	240,841	0.87	−0.03	1	0
Append	236,353	0.85	+0.86	1	New
Ang Laban ng Indiginong Filipino	223,857	0.81	+0.03	0	−1
Ating Guro	214,080	0.77	New	0	0
Puwersa ng Bayaning Atleta	212,298	0.77	−0.11	0	−1
Aangat Tayo	207,855	0.75	+0.14	0	−1
Kasangga sa Kaunlaran	202,456	0.73	−0.28	0	−1
Bagong Henerasyon	190,001	0.69	−0.31	0	−1
Kapatiran ng mga Nakulong na Walang Sala	175,096	0.63	−0.17	0	−1
Piston Land Transport Coalition	174,976	0.63	New	0	0
Bayani	165,906	0.60	+0.34	0	0
Aksyon Magsasaka-Partido Tinig ng Masa	165,784	0.60	+0.04	0	0
Agrarian Development Association	164,702	0.59	+0.50	0	0
Isang Alyansang Aalalay sa Pinoy Skilled Workers	162,552	0.59	New	0	0
Abante Retirees Partylist Organization	161,915	0.58	+0.59	0	0
Katribu Indigenous Peoples Sectoral Party	153,844	0.56	+0.17	0	0
Association of Laborers and Employees	153,616	0.55	+0.56	0	0
1 Joint Alliance of Marginalized Group	153,072	0.55	−0.25	0	0
Action Brotherhood for Active Dreamers	150,854	0.54	−0.03	0	−1
Veterans Freedom Party	148,591	0.54	−0.01	0	0
Association of Philippine Electric Cooperatives	146,392	0.53	−0.54	0	−1
Pasang Masda Nationwide	134,944	0.49	+0.37	0	0
Una ang Pamilya	131,954	0.48	−0.26	0	−1
Alyansa ng mga Grupong Haligi ng Agham at Teknolohiya para sa Mamamayan	130,694	0.47	−0.36	0	−1
Ang Prolife	129,989	0.47	New	0	0
Pilipino Association for Country-Urban Poor Youth Advancement and Welfare	123,791	0.45	−0.04	0	0
1-United Transport Koalisyon	123,489	0.45	−0.30	0	−1
Isang Lapian ng Mangingisda at Bayan Tungo sa Kaunlaran	119,505	0.43	New	0	0
Isang Pangarap ng Bahay sa Bagong Buhay ng Maralitang Kababayan	117,516	0.42	+0.43	0	0
Akap Bata Sectoral Organization for Children	116,837	0.42	+0.05	0	0
Abante Katutubo	111,625	0.40	+0.31	0	0
Firm 24-K Association	103,316	0.37	+0.04	0	0
Alyansang Bayanihan ng mga Magsasaka Manggagawang Bukid at Mangingisda	102,021	0.37	−0.10	0	0
Ang Ladlad Lgbt Party	100,958	0.36	−0.02	0	0
Ang Agrikultura Natin Isulong	94,651	0.34	+0.14	0	0
Kasosyo Producer-Consumer Exchange Association	93,581	0.34	−0.27	0	−1
1 Bro-Philippine Guardians Brotherhood	88,603	0.32	New	0	0
Pilipinos with Disabilities	87,247	0.32	New	0	0
Sanlakas	86,854	0.31	New	0	0
Abante Tribung Makabansa	86,145	0.31	−0.20	0	0
Ako Ayoko sa Bawal na Droga	81,378	0.29	−0.02	0	0
Adhikain ng mga Dakilang Anak Maharlika	80,398	0.29	+0.06	0	0
Association for Righteousness Advocacy in Leadership	77,206	0.28	+0.14	0	0
Katipunan ng mga Anak ng Bayan All Filipino Democratic Movement	76,838	0.28	−0.29	0	0
Sectoral Party ang Minero	71,534	0.26	+0.12	0	0
Action League of Indigenous Masses	67,807	0.24	−0.06	0	0
Ating Agapay Sentrong Samahan ng mga Obrero	65,119	0.24	New	0	0
1-A Action Moral & Values Recovery Reform Philippines	65,095	0.24	+0.22	0	0
Aagapay sa Matatanda	59,844	0.22	+0.21	0	0
1 Guardians Nationalist of the Philippines	58,406	0.21	−0.20	0	0
Adhikain at Kilusan ng Ordinaryong Tao para sa Lupa Pabahay Hanapbuhay at Kaunlaran	51,806	0.19	+0.01	0	0
Migrante Sectoral Party of Overseas Filipinos and Their Families	51,431	0.19	New	0	0
Alyansa ng OFW Party	51,069	0.18	−0.13	0	0
Ugnayan ng Maralita Laban sa Kahirapan	45,492	0.16	New	0	0
Alliance for Rural Concerns	45,120	0.16	−0.04	0	0
Alliance of Bicolnon Party	44,324	0.16	−0.03	0	0
Blessed Federation of Farmers and Fishermen International	43,829	0.16	−0.05	0	0
Alliance of Advocates in Mining Advancement for National Progress	42,853	0.15	−0.01	0	0
Advance Community Development in New Generation	42,819	0.15	New	0	0
Alliance for Rural and Agrarian Reconstruction	41,257	0.15	−0.35	0	0
United Movement against Drug Foundation	41,023	0.15	+0.05	0	0
Association of Marine Officer & Ratings	40,955	0.15	New	0	0
Mamamayan Tungo sa Maunlad na Pilipinas	40,218	0.15	New	0	0
Anti-War/Anti-Terror Mindanao Peace Movement	39,206	0.14	+0.01	0	0
Green Force for the Environment Sons and Daughters of Mother Earth	30,581	0.11	−0.04	0	0
Agila ng Katutubong Pilipino	29,739	0.11	−0.25	0	0
Alyansa ng Media at Showbiz	28,263	0.10	+0.04	0	0
Alagad	27,883	0.10	−0.68	0	−1
Alliance for Philippines Security Guards Cooperative	27,400	0.10	+0.04	0	0
Kababaihang Lingkod Bayan sa Pilipinas	24,369	0.09	−0.09	0	0
1-Abilidad	21,900	0.08	+0.07	0	0
Alyansa Lumad Mindanao	19,381	0.07	+0.01	0	0
Total	27,687,240	100.00	–	58	+3
Valid votes	27,687,240	68.97	−9.91		
Invalid/blank votes	12,456,967	31.03	+9.91		
Total votes	40,144,207	100.00	–		
Registered voters/turnout	52,982,173	75.77	+1.43		
Source: COMELEC tally winning parties 1 2 3; Supreme Court: Abang Lingkod, Senior Citizens

=== Autonomous Region in Muslim Mindanao elections ===
Originally scheduled for 2011, Congress postponed the election to 2013 in order for reforms to be put in place and for the regional election to be synchronized with the 2013 election. All seats of regional elected officials are up.

=== Local elections ===
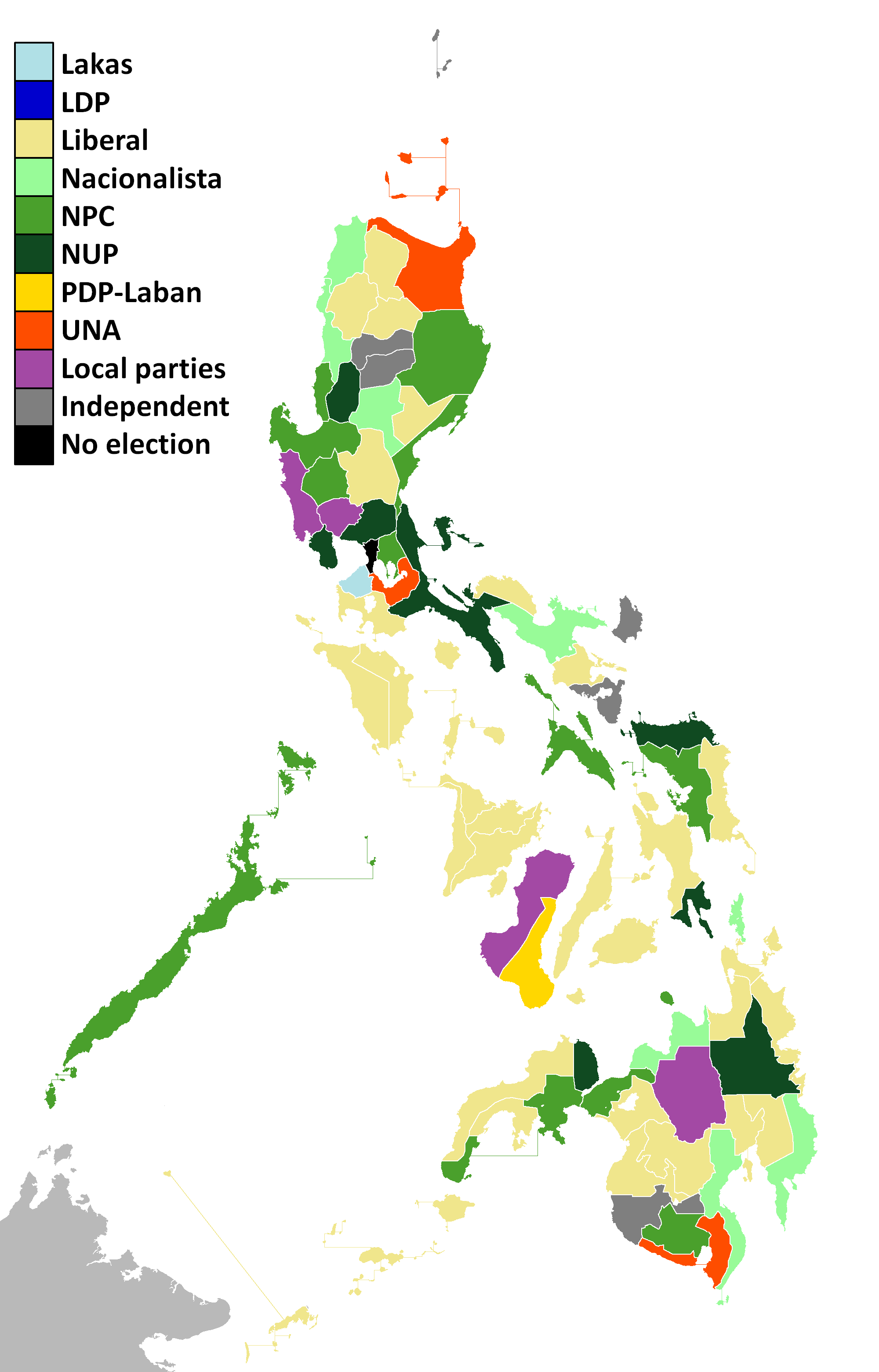
Gubernatorial election results.

All local government units (LGUs) had their elections on this day. Positions up are mayors, vice mayors, councilors, and if applicable, governors, vice governors and board members.

Position	Lakas	LDP	LP	NP	NPC	NUP	PDP Laban	PMP	UNA	Others	Ind.	Total
Regional governor	0	0	1	0	0	0	0	0	0	0	0	1
Regional vice governor	0	0	1	0	0	0	0	0	0	0	0	1
Regional assemblyman	0	0	20	0	0	1	0	0	0	0	3	24
Provincial governor	1	0	36	7	14	8	1	0	4	4	5	80
Provincial vice governor	3	2	36	11	12	4	0	0	5	2	5	80
Provincial board members	18	5	300	102	112	74	4	3	44	47	57	766
City mayor	6	0	61	9	22	10	3	1	16	10	5	143
City vice mayor	4	2	57	12	19	11	1	1	16	13	7	143
City councilors	41	10	647	153	206	88	24	6	169	135	119	1,598
Municipal mayor	35	9	604	150	224	128	18	21	113	97	87	1,491
Municipal vice mayor	33	11	570	154	220	112	16	13	114	87	154	1,491
Municipal councilors	282	66	4,629	1,219	1,560	882	132	91	841	685	1,834	11,932

== Controversies ==
Election watchdog AES Watch has called the 2013 elections "a technology and political disaster" due to several controversies, including premature proclamation of candidates and irregular decisions made during the canvassing.

=== PCOS transmission issues ===
On the day of elections, an estimated 18,000 voting machines, representing a quarter of the total 78,000 machines, experienced problems in transmitting the voting results. The Comelec claimed that the problems were caused not by the machines themselves, but by corrupted compact flash cards and issues with the cellular network coverage. Comelec Chairman Sixto Brillantes claimed that the Comelec was aware of problems with cellular network coverage, but deliberately kept it from the public until after the election. The poll watchdog AES Watch issued a statement on May 18, saying that up to 8.6 million votes had been affected, or possibly disenfranchised.

Philippine Long Distance Telephone Company, the Philippines' largest telecommunications company, released a statement dismissing the Comelec's allegations of cellular network problems, saying that the combined networks of Smart Communications and Sun Cellular covered every city and municipality in the country, and no unusually heavy traffic was recorded on election day.

The Comelec failed to meet its self-imposed deadline of proclaiming winners in the senatorial election 48 hours after the end of the voting period.

=== Senatorial winners proclamation ===
The COMELEC proclaimed the first six senatorial winners of the election on May 16, though only 20 percent of election results had been canvassed. Three more winners were proclaimed the following day. The winners were proclaimed alphabetically rather than by the number of votes garnered, since the vote totals had not yet been finalized. Winning candidates Nancy Binay and Koko Pimentel declined to attend the proclamation, on the advice of their lawyers.

=== Lack of source code review ===
Following the election, a poll watchdog alleged that the Comelec failed to do a review of the source code for voting machines used in the election, in violation of the Automated Election Systems Law. Under the law, the technical committee must have documented certification that the all hardware and software components were operating properly at least three months before the elections.

=== Vote-rigging speculation ===
Speculations of election fraud turned up following the elections, as the vote canvassing revealed a "60-30-10" pattern of votes—wherein administration, opposition, and independent senatorial candidates consistently obtained 60 percent, 30 percent, and 10 percent of the votes respectively.

== See also ==
- 2013 Philippine barangay elections
- Commission on Elections
- Elections in the Philippines
- Congress of the Philippines
