= 2013 Bocaue local elections =

2013 Bocaue mayoral election
- May 13, 2013
Nominee	Eduardo Villanueva, Jr.	Jose Santiago, Jr.
Party	Liberal	PMP
Running mate	Dioscoro Juan, Jr.	Emmanuel Cruz
Popular vote	17,473	17,324
Percentage	45.75	44.47
Mayor before election
Eduardo Villanueva, Jr.
Liberal
Elected mayor
Eduardo Villanueva, Jr.
Liberal

Local elections were held in Bocaue on May 13, 2013 within the Philippine general election. The voters elected for the elective local posts in the city: the mayor, vice mayor, and eight councilors.

== Mayoral and vice mayoral election ==
Incumbent Mayor Eduardo "Jon Jon" Villanueva Jr. decided to seek reelection under Liberal, however he is still member of Bangon Pilipinas, he faced incumbent vice mayor Jose Santiago, Jr. of PMP, former Mayor Serafin Dela Cruz under Lakas-CMD, and Independent Candidates Rodolfo Dela Cruz and Gregorio Dela Cruz, Sr.

Villanueva's running mate was Councilor Dioscoro Juan, Jr., son of a former Bocaue Mayor Dioscoro Juan.

== Results ==
The candidates for mayor and vice mayor with the highest number of votes wins the seat; they are voted separately, therefore, they may be of different parties when elected.

=== Mayoral election ===
Eduardo "Jon-Jon" Villanueva, Jr. is the incumbent.

Bocaue mayoral election
Party	Candidate	Votes	%
Liberal	Eduardo Villanueva, Jr.	17,473	45.75
PMP	Jose Santiago, Jr.	17,324	44.47
Independent	Rodolfo Dela Cruz	3,238	8.48
Lakas	Serafin Dela Cruz	1,994	5.22
Independent	Gregorio Dela Cruz, Sr.	99	0.26
Margin of victory		3,393	8.88%
Invalid or blank votes		1,306	3.42
Total votes		38,190	100.00
Liberal hold			

=== Vice Mayoralty Election ===
Incumbent Jose "JJS" Santiago, Jr. is running for mayor.

Bocaue vice mayoralty election
Party	Candidate	Votes	%
Liberal	Dioscoro Juan, Jr.	13,787	36.10
PMP	Emmanuel Cruz	10,437	27.33
Independent	Rommel Villanueva	6,347	16.62
Independent	Candido Halili	3,763	9.85
Margin of victory		3,350	8.77%
Invalid or blank votes		3,856	10.10
Total votes		38,190	100.00
Liberal gain from PMP			

== Municipal Council election ==
Voting is via plurality-at-large voting: Voters vote for eight candidates and the top eight candidates with the highest number of votes are elected.

=== Results ===
The top eight winning councilors duly elected on May 13, 2013 elections:

Municipal Council Election at Bocaue
Party	Candidate	Votes	%
Liberal	Aldrin Sta. Ana	22,878	{{{percentage}}}
Liberal	Donnabel Mendoza	20,064	{{{percentage}}}
PMP	Noriel German	18,896	{{{percentage}}}
Liberal	Josef Andrew Mendoza	18,228	{{{percentage}}}
Liberal	Dennis Carpio	17,205	{{{percentage}}}
Liberal	Agapito Salonga	15,652	{{{percentage}}}
Liberal	Josey Ofracio	15,394	{{{percentage}}}
Liberal	Francis Jerome Reyes	14,520	{{{percentage}}}
