= Ramon Mitra =

Ramon Mitra may refer to:

- Ramon P. Mitra (1898–1978), Filipino politician and lawyer, mayor of Baguio and assemblyman from Mountain Province
- Ramon Mitra Jr. (1928–2000), Filipino politician and lawyer, 1992 presidential candidate and House speaker
- Ramon Mitra III (born 1962), Filipino politician and military officer, senatorial and congressional candidate
