= Regalado Maambong =

Filipino politician and jurist (1939–2011)

The Honourable Regalado E. Maambong
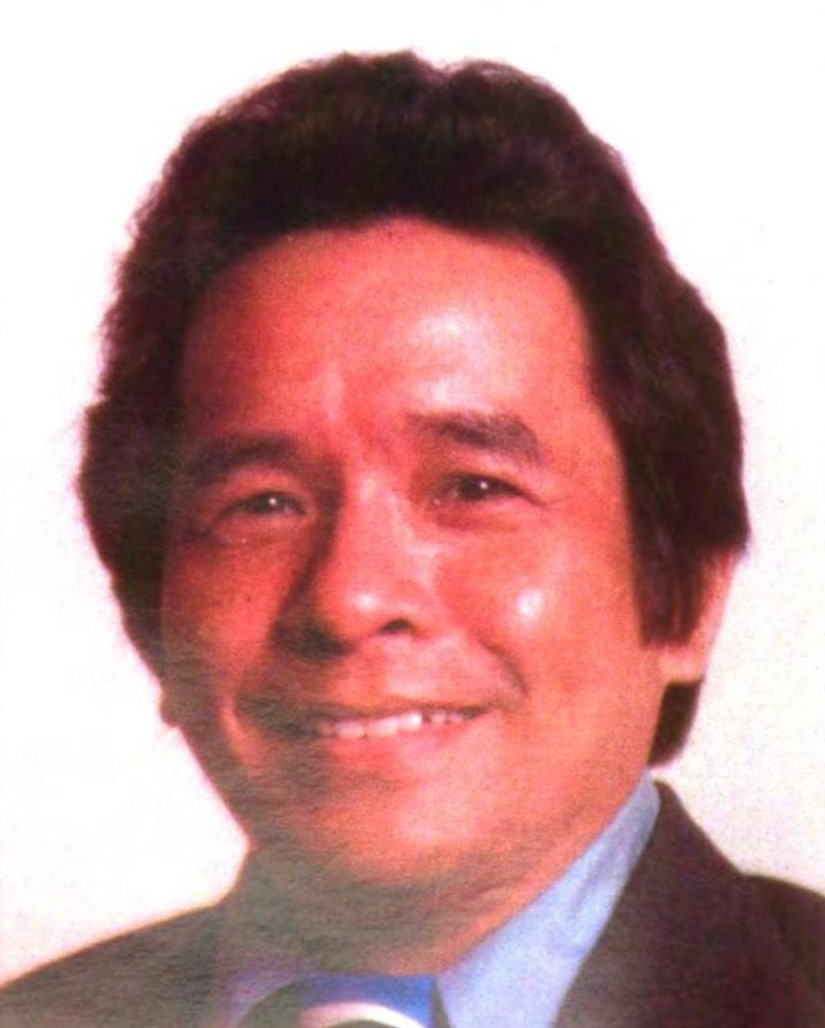
- Maambong from the Official Directory of the Constitutional Commission, c. 1986

Member of Philippine Constitutional Commission of 1986
- In office June 2, 1986 – October 15, 1986
- President: Corazon Aquino

Member of the Batasang Pambansa from Cebu
- In office July 23, 1984 – March 25, 1986 Serving with Emerito Calderon, Nenita Cortes-Daluz, Ramon Durano III, Luisito Patalinjug and Adelino Sitoy

Commission on Elections commissioner
- In office June 6, 1991 – February 15, 1998
- President: Corazon Aquino

Justice of the Court of Appeals of the Philippines
- In office April 15, 2002 – January 2, 2009
- President: Gloria Macapagal Arroyo

Personal details
- Born: January 2, 1939
- Died: May 27, 2011 (aged 72)
- Resting place: Garden Of The Divine Word, Christ the King Mission Seminary, Quezon City

Regalado "Dodong" Estrella Maambong (January 2, 1939 – May 27, 2011) was a Filipino jurist, politician and member of the 1986 Constitutional Commission, which drafted the Constitution of the Philippines.

== Profile and career ==
He was born in Santa Fe, Cebu. His father, Joaquin Tagalog Maambong, was a judge. He studied pre-law at the University of San Carlos in Cebu, before completing his law degree at Ateneo de Manila University, a Jesuit university in Manila. He passed the Philippines bar exam within the top 20 for the country. A criminologist, Maambong later served as the dean of the College of Criminology of the University of the Visayas.

Maambong served in both the Filipino legislative and executive branches of government. He was elected to the Batasang Pambansa in 1984 as a member of the Kilusang Bagong Lipunan (KBL).

After the fall of Ferdinand Marcos, President Corazon Aquino appointed Maambong as a trial judge in Cebu and then as a member of the 1986 Constitutional Commission. As a member of the Commission, Maambong helped to write and draft the Constitution of the Philippines drafted in 1987. Aquino then appointed Maambong as a Commissioner of the Commission on Elections, or Comelec.

Maambong retired from Comelec and ran as a candidate for Governor of Cebu in 2001. However, he was defeated by Pablo Garcia. In 2002, President Gloria Macapagal Arroyo appointed him as an associate justice of the Court of Appeals of the Philippines. He served as the chairman of the 15th Division of the Court of Appeals until 2009. Maambong made an unsuccessful bid for the Philippine Senate in 2010.

He was considered an expert in election law. Maambong spearheaded and advocated the automation of the Philippines election system, which was fully implemented for the May 2010 Philippine general election.

== Death ==
Regalado Maambong died from multiple organ failure at his condominium in Quezon City on May 27, 2011, aged 72. He was survived by his wife, Ruth, two sons Victor and Renren, and five grandchildren. Maambong was laid in state at St. Peter's Memorial Chapel, cremated at Quezon City Columbarium, and his remains returned to Cebu, his home province. His ashes were spread at a cemetery in Asturias, Cebu.

Philippines Chief Justice Renato Corona called Maambong "a great man. A constitutionalist, an election expert and a great jurist. [The death of] Justice Maambong was a big loss to the legal circle and to the academe. His contributions in the field of law will never be forgotten."
