= Kata Inocencio =

Filipina journalist

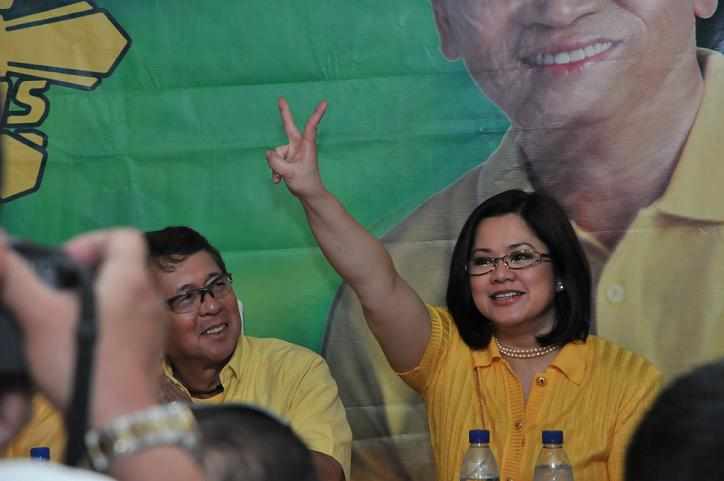
- Kata Inocencio with Perfecto Yasay
- Born: Katherine Inocencio; September 15, 1960 (age 65); Philippines
- Other name: Kata
- Occupations: Broadcast journalist; TV host
- Political party: Bangon

Katherine Inocencio (Tagalog pronunciation: [ɪnɔˈsɛnʃo]; born September 15, 1960) is a Filipino broadcast journalist, child rights advocate, television producer and host. She was a candidate for Senator in the 2010 national elections under the Bangon Pilipinas Party of Bro. Eddie Villanueva.

== Early life ==
A graduate of the University of the Philippines, Inocencio joined television network ABS-CBN in 1986. She covered President Corazon Aquino as a Malacanang Correspondent. She also substitute anchor for Mel Tiangco on ABS-CBN's flagship newscast, TV Patrol with Noli de Castro and Frankie Evangelista from 1987 to 1996. Aside from ABS-CBN News, Inocencio was involved with ABS-CBN Foundation and produced and hosted its television program, Bantay Bata 163, a docu-drama program that campaigned against child abuse.

In August 2001, Inocencio left ABS-CBN to join a ministry that blessed Israel. She joined the Christian Broadcasting Network (CBN) as Vice President for Production in 2006. She hosted The 700 Club Asia on QTV^{3} with Peter Kairuz, Coney Reyes, Maricel Laxa-Pangilinan, Mari Kaimo, and Felici Pangilinan-Buizon. As Executive Producer of the 700 Club Asia, Kata produced several stories focusing on the plight of Overseas Filipino Workers^{2}.

Inocencio also hosted the talk show Diyos at Bayan with Bro. Eddie Villanueva, aired on GMA News TV and GMA Network, from 2004 to 2010 from 2011 to 2014.

== Political life ==
On November 30, 2009, Inocencio filed her Certificate of Candidacy as Senator at the Commission on Elections (Comelec)^{4} under Bangon Pilipinas Party. Her platform focuses on the welfare of women and children, as well as fighting corruption.^{5} ^{6}

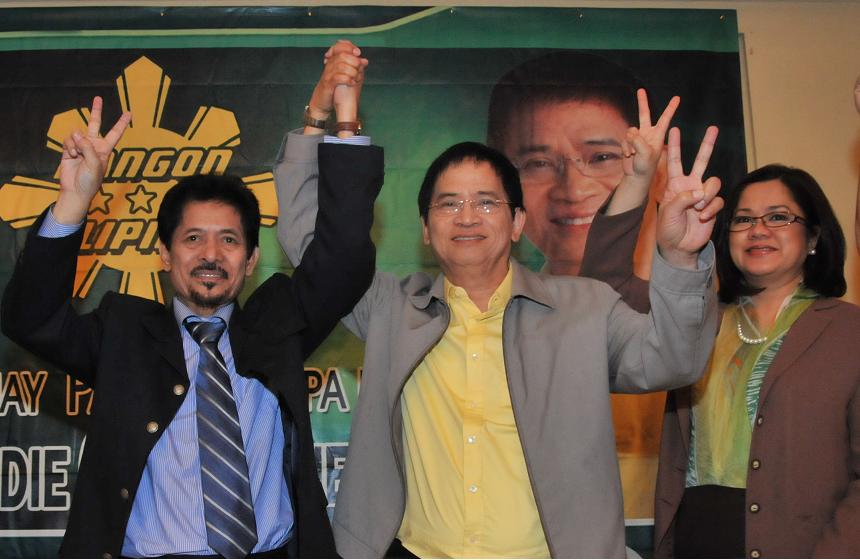
Kata Inocencio with Nur Misuari and Bro. Eddie Villanueva

== Personal life ==
Her maternal great-grandfather, Lope K. Santos, was a senator during the Quezon Administration, and governor of Rizal Province and Nueva Vizcaya.

== See also ==
- 2010 Philippine Senate election
- ABS-CBN News and Current Affairs
