= Raul Lambino =

Filipino lawyer (born 1958)

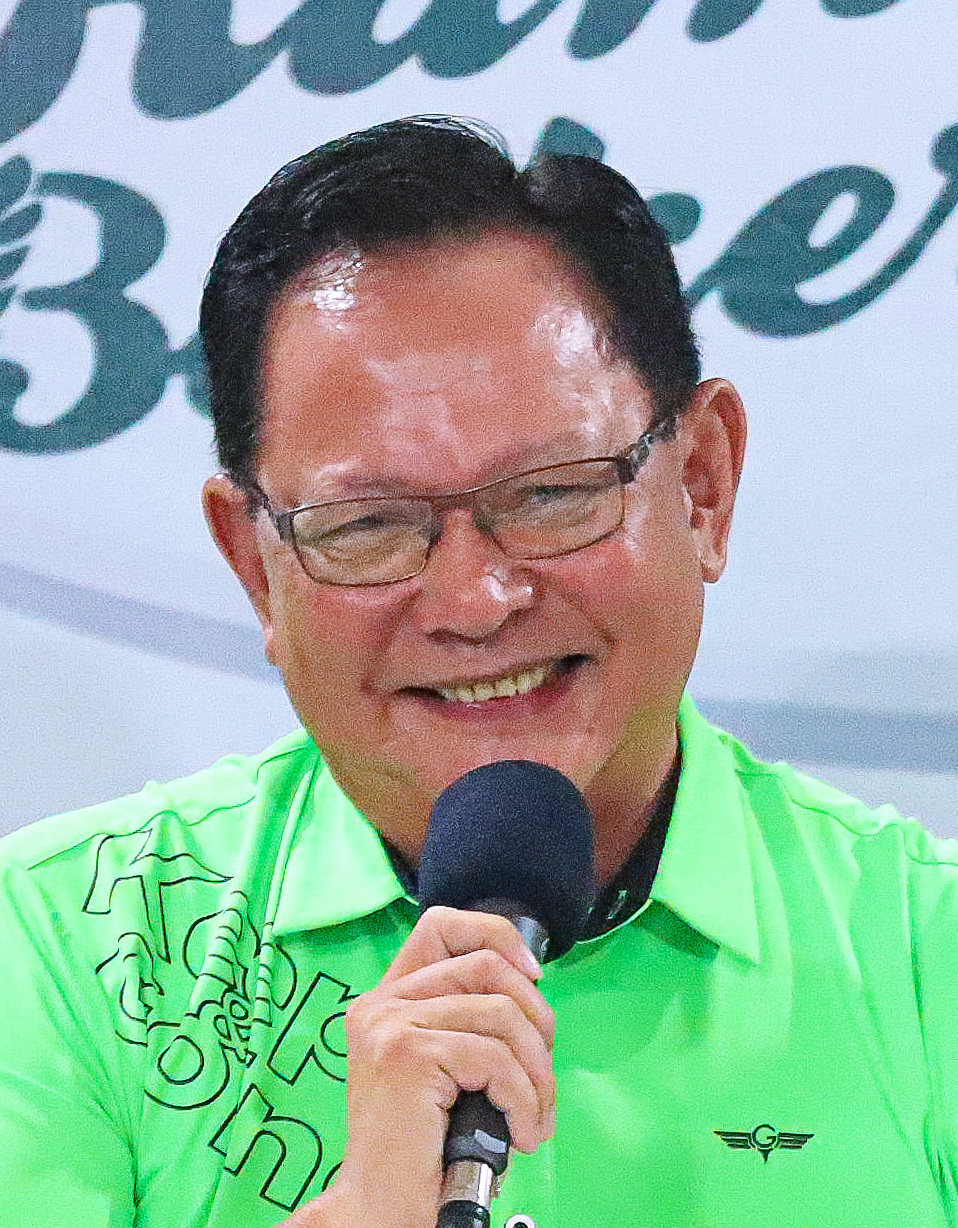
- Lambino in 2024

Administrator and Chief Executive Officer of the Cagayan Economic Zone Authority
- In office July 2017 – 2022
- President: Rodrigo Duterte

Presidential Adviser for North Luzon
- In office July 14, 2016 – July 2017
- President: Rodrigo Duterte

Personal details
- Born: Raul Loyola Lambino; March 9, 1958 (age 68) Pozorrubio, Pangasinan, Philippines
- Party: PDP (2016–present)
- Other political affiliations: Lakas (2009–2016)
- Spouse: Marilyn de Guzman
- Children: 3
- Education: University of Pangasinan (AB, LLB)
- Occupation: Lawyer

Raul Loyola Lambino (born March 9, 1958) is a Filipino lawyer. He led the signature campaign in 2005 to amend or revise the 1987 Philippine Constitution.

== Education ==
Lambino earned a Bachelor of Arts in Political Science, cum laude, from the University of Pangasinan in 1981. He obtained his Bachelor of Laws degree, valedictorian and cum laude also from the University of Pangasinan in 1986.

== Career ==
Lambino is an active trial lawyer. He is the Managing Partner of the R. Lambino & Partners Law Firm located at 2502D Philippine Stock Exchange Centre, Ortigas, Pasig. He has also been a senior partner at Gavero Lambino Almadro Villanueva Law Firm from 1995 to 2000.

== Academe ==
Lambino is a Professor of Law at the University of the East College of Law in Manila; and the University of Pangasinan College of Law in Dagupan. He has also been an Instructor of Political Science at the University of Pangasinan College of Liberal Arts from 1982 to 1987.

== Government ==
Lambino has been a Consultant and Coordinator for the Philippine House of Representatives contingent to the Commission on Appointments. He also served as consultant in the Office of the Speaker of the House of Representatives from 1995 to 1998, and from 2000 to 2001; Chief-of-Staff in the Office of Senator Loren Legarda from 1998 to 2000; Chief of Staff in the Office of Speaker Jose De Venecia from 1995 to 1998; and as Officer-in-Charge Provincial Board Member of the Province of Pangasinan from 1987 to 1988.

== Organizational affiliations ==
Lambino is an Ambassador for Peace at the Inter-religious and International Confederation for World Peace; and the Interreligious and International Peace Council. He is a Life Member of the Philippine Constitution Association (Philconsa), and an active member of the ASEAN Law Association and the Integrated Bar of the Philippines.

He is also the Chairman of Green Smiley through Green Team Pilipinas. He is also a member of Alpha Phi Omega-Alpha Gamma chapter.

== Constitutional change proposal ==
Lambino once proposed of Congress abolishment, with an installation of Senate composed of 60 members, elected by region. He also proposed a singe ticket vote system for president and vice president.

== Political career ==
Lambino ran as senator in 2010 under Lakas, and 2025 under DuterTen, but lost in both occurrences.

== Personal life ==
Lambino is married to Marilyn de Guzman, and has three children: Mark Ronald, Mary Rhauline, and Meryllainne Rhacquel.

== Electoral history ==
Electoral history of Raul Lambino
Year	Office	Party	Votes received				Result
Year	Office	Party	Total	%	P.	Swing	Result
2010	Senator of the Philippines	Lakas–Kampi	1,156,294	3.03%	39st	—N/a	Lost
2025	Senator of the Philippines	PDP	8,383,593	14.62%	24th	+11.59	Lost
