= Grace Riñoza-Plazo =

Filipino lawyer and mediation counselor (born 1948)

- Born: Maria Gracia de Veas Riñoza
- Occupations: Lawyer, mediation counselor
- Years active: 1982–present
- Political party: Ang Kapatiran
- Spouse: Rodolfo F. Plazo

Maria Gracia "Grace" de Veas Riñoza-Plazo is a Filipino lawyer and mediation counselor. She ran in the 2010 Philippine senatorial election as one of seven candidates fielded by the conservative Ang Kapatiran party, where she placed 60th in the overall tally.

== Biography ==
Riñoza-Plazo then began her tertiary studies at the University of the Philippines Diliman in 1964, pursuing a degree in political science, but then transferred to Canossa College, Lipa, where she graduated in 1970 with a degree in English. She then pursued law studies at the Ateneo de Manila College of Law, where she graduated in 1981, and where she placed 30th in that year's bar examination.

== Career ==
Prior to starting her legal practice in 1982, Grace Riñoza-Plazo was employed as branch manager at Foundation Homes Realty from 1971 to 1973, a sales supervisor at V.V. Soliven Realty Corporation from 1973 to 1975, and as proprietor manager of Hearth Realty from 1983 to 1995. In the course of her legal career, she has served as counsel for groups such as the Center of Family Ministries at the Ateneo de Manila University, and the Buklod Kabataan Center, among other groups.

In 2007, she self-published two books on her legal practice and mediation work: Running on Divine Energy and Easing the Pains of Battle.

=== Involvement in politics and 2010 senatorial bid ===
In the 2010 senatorial election, Riñoza-Plazo was one of the two female candidates comprising the Ang Kapatiran slate: the other being fellow lawyer Jo Imbong. Specific issues that she advocated during the campaign included agrarian reform, financial assistance programs for the poor to help them set up small businesses, and the family. She lost in the election, placing 60th out of 61 candidates with 151,755 votes.

After running in the 2010 election, she later claimed that there were irregularities in the election's conduct despite its automation. She then joined Tanggulang Demokrasya (TanDem; Defense of Democracy), a coalition of groups that advocates for the non-use of the machines used in the 2010 elections in subsequent polls.
