= Zosimo Paredes =

Filipino politician

Spokesperson of the Department of National Defense
- In office October 5, 2011 – November 24, 2011
- Appointed by: Voltaire Gazmin
- Preceded by: Hernando Iriberri
- Succeeded by: Peter Paul Galvez

Executive Director of the Presidential Commission on the Visiting Forces Agreement
- In office 2004–2007

Member of the Regular Batasang Pambansa from Ifugao's Lone District
- In office June 30, 1984 – March 25, 1986
- Preceded by: Romulo B. Lumauig (as Representative)
- Succeeded by: Gualberto B. Lumauig (as Representative)

Undersecretary of the Office of Muslim Affairs and Cultural Communities
- In office 1984–1986

Personal details
- Born: May 27, 1948 (age 78) Manila, Philippines
- Party: Bangon Pilipinas (2010–present); Ang Kapatiran (2007–2010); Nacionalista (1987); KBL (1984–1986)
- Spouse: Maria Olivia Errea Dela Merced Paredes
- Education: Philippine Military Academy
- Occupation: Civil servant
- Profession: Politician

Military service
- Allegiance: Republic of the Philippines
- Branch/service: Philippine Constabulary
- Years of service: 1971–1984

Zosimo Jesus "Jess" Paredes II (born May 27, 1948) is a Filipino former politician.

== Politics ==
Paredes was elected Assemblyman of Regular Batasang Pambansa representing Ifugao from 1984 until its dissolution in 1986.

He has ran thrice for the Senate namely, the 1987 Senatorial elections under the Grand Alliance for Democracy, the same party of Joseph Estrada and Juan Ponce Enrile, but placed 46th, the 2007 Senatorial elections under the Ang Kapatiran Party but placed 29th, and in 2010 under Bangon Pilipinas but placed 52nd.

He was the former head of Presidential Commission on the Visiting Forces Agreement (VFACom) later on resigned at the height of the Philippine government's perceived protection of convicted American rapist Lance Corp. Daniel Smith after the latter's transfer of detention from the Makati City Jail to the United States Embassy in Manila.

In 2011, he was appointed as spokesperson of the Department of National Defense, assuming office on October 5. However, he resigned from the post for unknown reasons on November 24.

== Personal life ==
He is related to Horacio Paredes and Jim Paredes (a member of APO Hiking Society and a composer-singer). Paredes used to host two programs on DZXQ 1350:

- Para sa Diyos, Bayan at Sambayanan
- Moral Force Radio
