= 2010 Philippine Senate election =

30th Philippine senatorial election

- May 10, 2010

12 (of the 24) seats to the Senate 13 seats needed for a majority
| | First party | Second party | Third party |
|---|---|---|---|
| Party | Liberal | Nacionalista | PMP |
| Seats won | 4 | 3 | 2 |
| Popular vote | 97,187,269 | 80,719,737 | 51,960,970 |
| Percentage | 32.72% | 27.18% | 17.49% |
| | Fourth party | Fifth party |
| Party | Lakas–Kampi | NPC |
| Seats won | 2 | 1 |
| Popular vote | 38,123,091 | 11,891,711 |
| Percentage | 12.83% | 4.00% |
Senate President before election
Juan Ponce Enrile
PMP
Elected Senate President
Juan Ponce Enrile
PMP

The 30th election of members to the Senate of the Philippines was held on Monday, May 10, 2010, to elect 12 of the 24 seats in the Senate. The winners in this election joined the winners of the 2007 election to form the 15th Congress of the Philippines. The senators elected in 2007 will serve until June 30, 2013, while the senators elected in this election will serve up to June 30, 2016. The 2010 presidential election, elections to the House of Representatives as well as local elections occurred on the same date. The Philippines uses plurality-at-large voting for seats in the Senate: the twelve candidates with the highest number of votes wins the twelve seats up for election.

In the election, ten senators that had previously served in the Senate, six of them incumbents, were re-elected. The two neophytes, Bongbong Marcos and TG Guingona, had their fathers previously serve in the Senate. The first nine candidates that were leading in the canvassing of votes by the Commission on Elections were proclaimed winners on May 15, while the last three were proclaimed on May 18.

After the election, no party won a majority of seats, although the Liberal Party had the most seats with five, although with the election of Benigno Aquino III as president, the Liberals will have 4 members in the Senate. The independents have five, while the Nacionalista Party and Lakas–CMD have four each. It is expected that Manuel Villar of the Nacionalistas and Francis Pangilinan from the Liberals be the top contenders to be Senate President; incumbent Juan Ponce Enrile (PMP) originally said he would not seek the office, but with the inability of either of the frontrunners to garner the required thirteen votes, he has presented himself as a compromise candidate to avoid deadlock.

On the convening of the 15th Congress on July 25, Enrile was successfully reelected as Senate President by 17 senators, with 3 senators voting for his opponent, Alan Peter Cayetano of the Nacionalistas. Three more senators did not attend, and one seat was vacated by Benigno Aquino III who was elected President.

== Electoral system ==
Philippine Senate elections are via pluraity block voting, with the entire country as an at-large "district". Each voter has 12 votes, and can vote for up to 12 candidates. Seats up were the seats last contested in 2004.

== Retiring and term-limited incumbents ==
Three senators are voluntarily retiring from the Senate at the end of their current term (two ran for president, and another for vice president; all lost), while two other senators are term-limited by the Constitution of the Philippines after serving two consecutive terms.

1. Rodolfo Biazon (Liberal)
  Term-limited in 2010, ran for House representative from Muntinlupa's at-large district and won.
2. Dick Gordon (Bagumbayan–VNP)
  Ran for President and lost. Ran for senator in 2013 and lost; ran again in 2016 and won.
3. Jamby Madrigal (Independent)
  Ran for President and lost. Ran for senator in 2013 and lost.
4. Nene Pimentel (PDP–Laban)
  Term-limited in 2010. Pimentel subsequently retired from politics.
5. Mar Roxas (Liberal)
  Ran for vice president and lost. Ran for president in 2016 and lost; ran for senator in 2019 and still lost.

== Campaign ==
The candidates had varied campaign strategies, but Liberal and Nacionalista candidates relied on TV advertisements for exposure. Celebrities also endorsed candidates, notably Kris Aquino for Tito Sotto and Sharon Cuneta for Neric Acosta. As a callback to the successful "VOT FOR D CHAMMP" and "MaS PARA SA KiDZ Mo" campaign slogan of the People Power Coalition and TEAM Unity during the 2001, and 2007. respectively. the Liberals used the "SLAMAT LORRRD" acronym to easily convey their senatorial line-up.

On April 18, ABS-CBN held the Harapan (Face-Off) senatorial debates at La Consolacion College – Manila. Adel Tamano scored the highest rating amongst the candidates who participated, followed by Neric Acosta and Risa Hontiveros-Baraquel, while Francisco Tatad rated poorly.

Actors Bong Revilla (born Ramon Revilla Jr.), who changed his legal name to his screen name "Bong Revilla" prior to the campaign period, and Jinggoy Estrada, together with Miriam Defensor Santiago consistently topped the poll surveys from Social Weather Stations and Pulse Asia. On the other hand, while all incumbent senators who are running appeared safe to retain their seats, it appeared that no party will win a majority of the 12 seats being contested.

== Candidates ==
On December 15, 2009, the Commission on Elections (COMELEC) released the approved list of candidates for the Senate elections. On January 14, 2010, the COMELEC approved four more candidates for the Senate, reaching a total of 61.

These are the candidates that were listed on the ballot, with order determined by surname. The tickets are as advertised by the coalition; these are unrecognized by the COMELEC but is extensively used by the media. The COMELEC does list the political parties of the candidates on the ballot. One has twelve votes for senator, with one vote for every candidate. A voter can distribute one's vote to any ticket as one seems fit. One can vote less than the twelve candidates from any ticket (open list), although the coalitions encourage voters to vote "12–0" (if applicable). A voter who had voted for more than twelve candidates will have his ballot spoiled, invalidating the rest of that voter's votes in the senate election.

A candidate may be included in more than one ticket; a party, if it has not enough candidates to complete a 12-candidate ticket, can invite guest candidates from other parties. These guest candidates can choose to acknowledge their inclusion in other tickets and are not bound to follow the policies of the tickets that adopted them.

Ang Kapatiran ticket
| # | Name | Party |
|---|---|---|
| 11. | Rizalito David | Ang Kapatiran |
| 21. | Jo Imbong | Ang Kapatiran |
| 50. | Grace Riñoza-Plazo | Ang Kapatiran |
| 52. | Adrian Sison | Ang Kapatiran |
| 55. | Reginald Tamayo | Ang Kapatiran |
| 56. | Hector Tarrazona | Ang Kapatiran |
| 59. | Manny Valdahuesa | Ang Kapatiran |

Bangon Pilipinas ticket
| # | Name | Party |
|---|---|---|
| 3. | Zafrullah Alonto | Bangon Pilipinas |
| 22. | Kata Inocencio | Bangon Pilipinas |
| 35. | Adz Nikabulin | Bangon Pilipinas |
| 36. | Ramoncito Ocampo | Bangon Pilipinas |
| 42. | Imelda Papin | Bangon Pilipinas |
| 43. | Zosimo Paredes | Bangon Pilipinas |
| 46. | Reynaldo Princesa | Independent |
| 58. | Alex Tinsay | Bangon Pilipinas |
| 61. | Israel Virgines | Bangon Pilipinas |

Kilusang Bagong Lipunan ticket
| # | Name | Party |
|---|---|---|
| 2. | Shariff Ibraim Albani | KBL |
| 16. | Nanette Espinosa | KBL |
| 29. | Alma Lood | KBL |
| 60. | Hector Villanueva | KBL |

Lakas–Kampi–CMD ticket
| # | Name | Party |
|---|---|---|
| 6. | Silvestre Bello III | Lakas–Kampi |
| 8. | Bong Revilla | Lakas–Kampi |
| 18. | Ramon Guico Jr. | Lakas–Kampi |
| 24. | Raul Lambino | Lakas–Kampi |
| 25. | Rey Langit | Lakas–Kampi |
| 27. | Lito Lapid | Lakas–Kampi |

Liberal Party ticket
| # | Name | Party |
|---|---|---|
| 1. | Neric Acosta | Liberal |
| 5. | Martin Bautista | Liberal |
| 7. | Ruffy Biazon | Liberal |
| 14. | Franklin Drilon | Liberal |
| 19. | TG Guingona | Liberal |
| 20. | Risa Hontiveros | Liberal |
| 23. | Alex Lacson | Liberal |
| 26. | Yasmin Lao | Liberal |
| 28. | Danilo Lim | Independent |
| 40. | Serge Osmeña | Independent |
| 48. | Ralph Recto | Liberal |
| 51. | Sonia Roco | Liberal |

Nacionalista Party ticket
| # | Name | Party |
|---|---|---|
| 10. | Pia Cayetano | Nacionalista |
| 13. | Miriam Defensor Santiago | PRP |
| 32. | Bongbong Marcos | Nacionalista |
| 33. | Liza Maza | Independent |
| 34. | Ramon Mitra III | Nacionalista |
| 37. | Satur Ocampo | Bayan Muna |
| 38. | Susan Ople | Nacionalista |
| 44. | Gwen Pimentel | PDP–Laban |
| 47. | Ariel Querubin | Nacionalista |
| 49. | Gilbert Remulla | Nacionalista |
| 54. | Adel Tamano | Nacionalista |

Pwersa ng Masang Pilipino ticket
| # | Name | Party |
|---|---|---|
| 4. | JV Bautista | PMP |
| 12. | Joey de Venecia | PMP |
| 15. | Juan Ponce Enrile | PMP |
| 17. | Jinggoy Estrada | PMP |
| 30. | Jun Lozada | PMP |
| 31. | Regalado Maambong | KBL |
| 45. | Rodolfo Plaza | NPC |
| 57. | Francisco Tatad | GAD |

Non-independents not on tickets
| # | Name | Party |
|---|---|---|
| 9. | Henry Caunan | PDP–Laban |
| 39. | Lito Osmeña | PROMDI |
| 53. | Tito Sotto | NPC |

Independents not in tickets
| # | Name | Party |
|---|---|---|
| 41. | Jovito Palparan | Independent |

== Opinion polls ==
Note: Tables only include confirmed candidates by the COMELEC.

The following are results of surveys taken after candidates were confirmed by the COMELEC.

| Poll source | Date(s) administered | Sample size | Margin of error | Candidates in the Top 12 | | | | | | | | Total |
| Poll source | Date(s) administered | Sample size | Margin of error | Lakas- Kampi | Liberal | Nacionalista | NPC | PDP-Laban | PRP | PMP | Ind. | Total |
|---|---|---|---|---|---|---|---|---|---|---|---|---|
| Election | May 10, 2010 | — | — | 2 | 3 | 2 | 1 | 0 | 1 | 2 | 1 | 12 |
| SWS | May 2–3, 2010 | 2,400 | ±2% | 2 | 3 | 2 | 1 | 0 | 1 | 2 | 1 | 12 |
| Pulse Asia | Apr. 23–25, 2010 | 1,800 | ±2% | 2 | 3 | 2 | 1 | 0 | 1 | 2 | 1 | 12 |
| SWS | Apr. 16–19, 2010 | 2,100 | ±2% | 1 | 2 | 3 | 1 | 0 | 1 | 2 | 1 | 12 |
| SWS | Mar. 19–22, 2010 | 2,100 | ±2% | 1 | 2 | 3 | 1 | 0 | 1 | 2 | 1 | 12 |
| The Center | Feb. 24–28, 2010 | 2,400 | ±2% | 2 | 3 | 2 | 1 | 0 | 1 | 2 | 1 | 12 |
| SWS | Feb. 24–28, 2010 | 2,100 | ±2% | 2 | 2 | 2 | 1 | 1 | 1 | 2 | 1 | 12 |
| Pulse Asia | Feb. 21–25, 2010 | 1,800 | ±2% | 2 | 3 | 2 | 1 | 0 | 1 | 2 | 1 | 12 |
| Pulse Asia | Jan. 22–26, 2010 | 1,800 | ±2% | 2 | 2 | 2 | 1 | 0 | 1 | 3 | 1 | 12 |
| SWS | Jan. 21–24, 2010 | 2,100 | ±2% | 1 | 3 | 2 | 1 | 0 | 1 | 3 | 1 | 12 |
| Pulse Asia | Dec. 8–10, 2009 | 1,800 | ±2.0% | 1 | 3 | 2 | 1 | 0 | 1 | 3 | 1 | 12 |
| SWS | Dec. 5–10, 2009 | 2,100 | ±2.2% | 2 | 3 | 2 | 1 | 0 | 1 | 2 | 1 | 12 |

== Results ==
Incumbents, former senators, and candidates whose other family members that had Senate experience performed well. All six incumbents who ran held their seats, four former senators also won, and the two neophyte senators, Bongbong Marcos and TG Guingona had their fathers (Ferdinand Marcos and Teofisto Guingona Jr., respectively) previously served at the Senate.

Among the six winning incumbents, three had family members that previously served in the Senate: Bong Revilla (son of Ramon Revilla Sr.), Jinggoy Estrada (son of Joseph Estrada) and Pia Cayetano (daughter of Rene Cayetano; her brother, Alan Peter Cayetano, won in 2007). The other winning incumbents are Miriam Defensor Santiago, Lito Lapid, and Senate president Juan Ponce Enrile.

The four former winning senators also had a family member with Senate experience: Ralph Recto (grandson of Claro M. Recto), Tito Sotto (grandson of Vicente Sotto) and Sergio Osmeña III (grandson of Sergio Osmeña and son of Sergio Osmeña Jr.). The other returning senator is Franklin Drilon.

Only one former senator ran and lost: Francisco Tatad; candidates with no prior Senate experience but had family members that previously served in the Senate but lost are Ruffy Biazon (son of outgoing Senator Rodolfo Biazon), Sonia Roco (wife of Raul Roco), Adel Tamano (son of Mamintal Tamano) and Susan Ople (daughter of Blas Ople).

The election of Benigno Aquino III as President of the Philippines in concurrent elections means that his Senate seat will be vacant until June 30, 2013.

| | 1 | 2 | 3 | 4 | 5 | 6 | 7 | 8 | 9 | 10 | 11 | 12 | 13 | 14 | 15 | 16 | 17 | 18 | 19 | 20 | 21 | 22 | 23 | 24 |
|---|---|---|---|---|---|---|---|---|---|---|---|---|---|---|---|---|---|---|---|---|---|---|---|---|
| Senate bloc | Majority bloc (16) | | | | | | | | | | | | | | | | | Minority bloc (7) | | | | | | |
| Before election | | | | | | | | ‡ | ‡ | ‡ | ‡ | ‡ | ‡ | ‡ | ‡ | ‡ | ‡^ | ‡ | ‡ | | | | | |
| Election result | Not up | | | | | | | LP | | | LKS-KAM | | PMP | | NP | NPC | Ind | PRP | NP | Not up | | | | |
| After election | | | | | | | | * | * | * | √ | √ | √ | √ | + | + | √ | √ | √ | | | | | ^ |
| Senate bloc | Majority bloc (17) | | | | | | | | | | | | | | | | | | Minority bloc (3) | | | | | |

Key:

- ‡ Seats up
- + Gained by a party from another party
- √ Held by the incumbent
- * Held by the same party with a new senator
- ^ Vacancy

=== Per candidate ===
A map showing the results by illustrating the topnotcher candidate by province.

| Candidate | Party or alliance | | Votes | % |
|---|---|---|---|---|
| Bong Revilla | Lakas Kampi CMD (Note: Guest candidate of Pwersa ng Masang Pilipino) (Note: Guest candidate of Nacionalista Party) | | 19,513,521 | 51.15 |
| Jinggoy Estrada | Pwersa ng Masang Pilipino | | 18,925,925 | 49.61 |
| Miriam Defensor Santiago | Nacionalista Party | People's Reform Party | 17,344,742 | 45.47 |
| Franklin Drilon | Liberal Party | | 15,871,117 | 41.60 |
| Juan Ponce Enrile | Pwersa ng Masang Pilipino | | 15,665,618 | 41.06 |
| Pia Cayetano | Nacionalista Party | | 13,679,511 | 35.86 |
| Bongbong Marcos | Nacionalista Party | | 13,169,634 | 34.52 |
| Ralph Recto | Liberal Party | | 12,436,960 | 32.60 |
| Tito Sotto | Nationalist People's Coalition | | 11,891,711 | 31.17 |
| Serge Osmeña | Liberal Party | Independent | 11,656,668 | 30.56 |
| Lito Lapid | Lakas Kampi CMD | | 11,025,805 | 28.90 |
| TG Guingona | Liberal Party | | 10,277,352 | 26.94 |
| Risa Hontiveros | Liberal Party | | 9,106,112 | 23.87 |
| Ruffy Biazon | Liberal Party | | 8,626,514 | 22.61 |
| Joey de Venecia | Pwersa ng Masang Pilipino | | 8,375,043 | 21.95 |
| Gilbert Remulla | Nacionalista Party | | 7,454,557 | 19.54 |
| Danilo Lim | Liberal Party | Independent | 7,302,784 | 19.14 |
| Sonia Roco | Liberal Party | | 6,774,010 | 17.76 |
| Ariel Querubin | Nacionalista Party | | 6,547,925 | 17.16 |
| Gwen Pimentel | Nacionalista Party | PDP–Laban | 6,394,347 | 16.76 |
| Nereus Acosta | Liberal Party | | 5,921,111 | 15.52 |
| Alex Lacson | Liberal Party | | 5,242,594 | 13.74 |
| Adel Tamano | Nacionalista Party | | 4,059,748 | 10.64 |
| Lito Osmeña | PROMDI | | 3,980,370 | 10.43 |
| Liza Maza | Nacionalista Party | Independent | 3,855,800 | 10.11 |
| Satur Ocampo | Nacionalista Party | Bayan Muna | 3,539,345 | 9.28 |
| Francisco Tatad | Pwersa ng Masang Pilipino | Grand Alliance for Democracy | 3,331,083 | 8.73 |
| Ramon Mitra III | Nacionalista Party | | 2,744,090 | 7.19 |
| Jun Lozada | Pwersa ng Masang Pilipino | | 2,730,279 | 7.16 |
| Rey Langit | Lakas Kampi CMD | | 2,694,213 | 7.06 |
| Silvestre Bello III | Lakas Kampi CMD | | 2,468,276 | 6.47 |
| Yasmin Lao | Liberal Party | | 2,081,895 | 5.46 |
| Imelda Papin | Bangon Pilipinas | | 1,972,667 | 5.17 |
| Susan Ople | Nacionalista Party | | 1,930,038 | 5.06 |
| Martin Bautista | Liberal Party | | 1,890,152 | 4.95 |
| Rodolfo Plaza | Pwersa ng Masang Pilipino | Nationalist People's Coalition | 1,517,905 | 3.98 |
| JV Bautista | Pwersa ng Masang Pilipino | | 1,415,117 | 3.71 |
| Ramon Guico Jr. | Lakas Kampi CMD | | 1,264,982 | 3.32 |
| Raul Lambino | Lakas Kampi CMD | | 1,156,294 | 3.03 |
| Hector Villanueva | Kilusang Bagong Lipunan | | 979,708 | 2.57 |
| Ramoncito Ocampo | Bangon Pilipinas | | 944,725 | 2.48 |
| Kata Inocencio | Bangon Pilipinas | | 888,771 | 2.33 |
| Jovito Palparan | Independent | | 825,208 | 2.16 |
| Alex Tinsay | Bangon Pilipinas | | 728,339 | 1.91 |
| Zafrullah Alonto | Bangon Pilipinas | | 712,628 | 1.87 |
| Reginald Tamayo | Ang Kapatiran | | 680,211 | 1.78 |
| Nanette Espinosa | Kilusang Bagong Lipunan | | 607,569 | 1.59 |
| Regalado Maambong | Pwersa ng Masang Pilipino | Kilusang Bagong Lipunan | 545,967 | 1.43 |
| Shariff Ibrahim Albani | Kilusang Bagong Lipunan | | 508,558 | 1.33 |
| Rizalito David | Ang Kapatiran | | 504,259 | 1.32 |
| Israel Virgines | Bangon Pilipinas | | 455,332 | 1.19 |
| Zosimo Paredes | Bangon Pilipinas | | 437,439 | 1.15 |
| Adrian Sison | Ang Kapatiran | | 418,055 | 1.10 |
| Reynaldo Princesa | Independent | | 364,245 | 0.95 |
| Jo Aurea Imbong | Ang Kapatiran | | 362,457 | 0.95 |
| Henry Adz Nikabulin | Bangon Pilipinas | | 346,848 | 0.91 |
| Henry Caunan | PDP–Laban | | 240,676 | 0.63 |
| Manuel Valdehuesa Jr. | Ang Kapatiran | | 201,118 | 0.53 |
| Hector Tarrazona | Ang Kapatiran | | 168,386 | 0.44 |
| Ma. Gracia Riñoza-Plazo | Ang Kapatiran | | 151,755 | 0.40 |
| Alma Lood | Kilusang Bagong Lipunan | | 128,045 | 0.34 |
| Total | | | 297,036,114 | 100.00 |
| Total votes | | | 38,149,371 | – |
| Registered voters/turnout | | | 51,317,073 | 74.34 |

=== Per coalition ===
| Party or alliance | | Votes | % | Seats |
|---|---|---|---|---|
| Liberal Party | Liberal Party | 78,227,817 | 26.34 | 3 |
| Liberal Party | Independent | 18,959,452 | 6.38 | 1 |
| Liberal Party | Total | 97,187,269 | 32.72 | 4 |
| Nacionalista Party | Nacionalista Party | 49,585,503 | 16.69 | 2 |
| Nacionalista Party | People's Reform Party | 17,344,742 | 5.84 | 1 |
| Nacionalista Party | PDP–Laban | 6,394,347 | 2.15 | 0 |
| Nacionalista Party | Bayan Muna | 3,539,345 | 1.19 | 0 |
| Nacionalista Party | Independent | 3,855,800 | 1.30 | 0 |
| Nacionalista Party | Total | 80,719,737 | 27.18 | 3 |
| Pwersa ng Masang Pilipino | Pwersa ng Masang Pilipino | 47,111,982 | 15.86 | 2 |
| Pwersa ng Masang Pilipino | Grand Alliance for Democracy | 3,331,083 | 1.12 | 0 |
| Pwersa ng Masang Pilipino | Nationalist People's Coalition | 1,517,905 | 0.51 | 0 |
| Pwersa ng Masang Pilipino | Total | 51,960,970 | 17.49 | 2 |
| Lakas Kampi CMD | | 38,123,091 | 12.83 | 2 |
| Nationalist People's Coalition | | 11,891,711 | 4.00 | 1 |
| Bangon Pilipinas | Bangon Pilipinas | 6,486,749 | 2.18 | 0 |
| Bangon Pilipinas | Independent | 364,245 | 0.12 | 0 |
| Bangon Pilipinas | Total | 6,850,994 | 2.31 | 0 |
| PROMDI | | 3,980,370 | 1.34 | 0 |
| Kilusang Bagong Lipunan | | 2,769,847 | 0.93 | 0 |
| Ang Kapatiran | | 2,486,241 | 0.84 | 0 |
| PDP–Laban | | 240,676 | 0.08 | 0 |
| Independent | | 825,208 | 0.28 | 0 |
| Total | | 297,036,114 | 100.00 | 12 |
| Total votes | | 38,149,371 | – | |
| Registered voters/turnout | | 51,317,073 | 74.34 | |

Vote share
| LP | 32.72% |
| NP | 25.88% |
| PMP | 17.49% |
| Lakas-Kampi | 12.83% |
| NPC | 4.00% |
| Others | 7.08% |

Senate seats
| LP | 33.33% |
| NP | 25.00% |
| PMP | 16.67% |
| Lakas-Kampi | 16.67% |
| NPC | 8.33% |
| Others | 0% |

=== Per party ===
With the election of Benigno Aquino III as president, there were only 23 seats in the Senate's chamber for the 15th Congress of the Philippines. There were calls to let the 13th placed candidate, Risa Hontiveros-Baraquel, to be proclaimed in lieu of Aquino leaving the Senate but neither her campaign nor the Liberal Party petitioned the commission on the matter. Aquino's vacated seat won't be contested in a special election as special elections for Senate vacancies can only be scheduled on the next scheduled election; that seat would be up for the 2013 election.

| Party | Votes | % | +/– | Seats | | | | |
| Party | Votes | % | +/– | Up | Before | Won | After | +/− |
|---|---|---|---|---|---|---|---|---|
| Liberal Party | 78,227,817 | 26.34 | +15.60 | 2 | 4 | 3 | 4 | 0 |
| Nacionalista Party | 49,585,503 | 16.69 | +6.59 | 1 | 3 | 2 | 4 | +1 |
| Pwersa ng Masang Pilipino | 47,111,982 | 15.86 | New | 2 | 2 | 2 | 2 | 0 |
| Lakas Kampi CMD | 38,123,091 | 12.83 | New | 2 | 4 | 2 | 4 | 0 |
| People's Reform Party | 17,344,742 | 5.84 | New | 1 | 1 | 1 | 1 | 0 |
| Nationalist People's Coalition | 13,409,616 | 4.51 | −14.00 | 0 | 1 | 1 | 2 | +1 |
| PDP–Laban | 6,635,023 | 2.23 | −1.83 | 1 | 1 | 0 | 0 | −1 |
| Bangon Pilipinas | 6,486,749 | 2.18 | New | 0 | 0 | 0 | 0 | 0 |
| PROMDI | 3,980,370 | 1.34 | New | 0 | 0 | 0 | 0 | 0 |
| Bayan Muna | 3,539,345 | 1.19 | New | 0 | 0 | 0 | 0 | 0 |
| Grand Alliance for Democracy/Gabaybayan | 3,331,083 | 1.12 | New | 0 | 0 | 0 | 0 | 0 |
| Kilusang Bagong Lipunan | 2,769,847 | 0.93 | +0.02 | 0 | 0 | 0 | 0 | 0 |
| Ang Kapatiran | 2,486,241 | 0.84 | +0.14 | 0 | 0 | 0 | 0 | 0 |
| Independent | 24,004,705 | 8.08 | +0.78 | 1 | 5 | 1 | 5 | 0 |
| Bagumbayan–VNP | | | | 1 | 1 | 0 | 0 | −1 |
| Laban ng Demokratikong Pilipino | | | | 0 | 1 | 0 | 1 | 0 |
| Vacancy | | | | 1 | 1 | 0 | 1 | 0 |
| Total | 297,036,114 | 100.00 | – | 12 | 24 | 12 | 24 | 0 |
| Total votes | 38,149,371 | – | | | | | | |
| Registered voters/turnout | 51,317,073 | 74.34 | | | | | | |

Vote share
| LP | 26.34% |
| NP | 16.69% |
| PMP | 15.86% |
| Lakas-Kampi | 12.83% |
| PRP | 5.84% |
| NPC | 4.51% |
| Independent | 8.08% |
| Others | 9.85% |

Senate seats
| LP | 25.00% |
| NP | 16.67% |
| PMP | 16.67% |
| Lakas-Kampi | 16.67% |
| PRP | 8.33% |
| NPC | 8.33% |
| Independent | 8.33% |
| Others | 0.00% |

=== Unofficial results ===
Several organizations released unofficial tallies when the commission's first preliminary tally was yet to be released.

==== Seats won per party ====
| Party | GMA | ABS-CBN | PPCRV-KBP | COMELEC |
|---|---|---|---|---|
| Ang Kapatiran | 0 | 0 | 0 | 0 |
| Bangon Pilipinas | 0 | 0 | 0 | 0 |
| Bayan Muna | 0 | 0 | 0 | 0 |
| GAD | 0 | 0 | 0 | 0 |
| KBL | 0 | 0 | 0 | 0 |
| Lakas | 2 | 2 | 2 | 2 |
| Liberal | 2 | 2 | | 3 |
| Nacionalista | 2 | 2 | 2 | 2 |
| NPC | 1 | 1 | 1 | 1 |
| PDP–Laban | 0 | 0 | 0 | 0 |
| PROMDI | 0 | 0 | 0 | 0 |
| PRP | 1 | 1 | 1 | 1 |
| PMP | 2 | 2 | 2 | 2 |
| Independent | 1 | 1 | 1 | 1 |
| Total | 12 | 12 | 12 | 12 |

==== Tally ====
Unofficial tallies
| Candidate | GMA | ABS-CBN | PPCRV-KBP |
|---|---|---|---|
| Bong Revilla | 17,834,240 | 18,067,258 | 17,833,613 |
| Jinggoy Estrada | 17,426,122 | 17,648,509 | 17,425,570 |
| Miriam Defensor Santiago | 15,935,263 | 16,120,251 | 15,934,691 |
| Franklin Drilon | 14,599,610 | 14,759,815 | 14,599,088 |
| Juan Ponce Enrile | 14,412,083 | 14,593,946 | 14,411,612 |
| Pia Cayetano | 12,616,984 | 12,766,917 | 12,616,482 |
| Bongbong Marcos | 12,163,443 | 12,324,840 | 12,162,974 |
| Ralph Recto | 11,401,735 | 11,530,000 | 11,401,308 |
| Tito Sotto | 10,958,520 | 11,108,765 | 10,958,033 |
| Sergio Osmeña III | 10,700,162 | 10,808,556 | 10,699,794 |
| Lito Lapid | 10,071,112 | 10,219,934 | 10,070,684 |
| TG Guingona | 9,475,804 | 9,578,745 | 9,475,488 |
| Risa Hontiveros | 8,418,317 | 8,507,677 | 8,417,999 |
| Ruffy Biazon | 7,955,653 | 8,407,778 | 7,995,346 |
| Joey de Venecia | 7,714,392 | 7,827,534 | 7,714,112 |
| Gilbert Remulla | 6,899,943 | | |
| Danilo Lim | 6,750,900 | | |
| Sonia Roco | 6,235,815 | | |
| Ariel Querubin | 6,039,860 | | |
| Gwendolyn Pimentel | 5,852,480 | | |
| Nereus Acosta | 5,446,263 | | |
| Alexander Lacson | 4,800,980 | | |
| Adel Tamano | 3,720,382 | | |
| Emilio Mario Osmeña | 3,602,080 | | |
| Liza Maza | 3,561,245 | | |
| Satur Ocampo | 3,271,714 | | |
| Francisco Tatad | 3,069,136 | | |
| Apolinario Lozada | 2,517,796 | | |
| Ramon Mitra III | 2,510,653 | | |
| Rey Langit | 2,467,966 | | |
| Silvestre Bello III | 2,249,492 | | |
| Yasmin Lao | 1,881,734 | | |
| Imelda Papin | 1,796,092 | | |
| Susan Ople | 1,778,000 | | |
| Martin Bautista | 1,725,342 | | |
| Rodolfo Plaza | 1,387,303 | | |
| JV Larion Bautista | 1,293,263 | | |
| Ramon Guico | 1,124,641 | | |
| Raul Lambino | 1,038,319 | | |
| Hector Villanueva | 884,988 | | |
| Ramoncito Ocampo | 857,649 | | |
| Kata Inocencio | 811,159 | | |
| Jovito Palparan Jr. | 743,376 | | |
| Alex Tinsay | 666,841 | | |
| Reginald Tamayo | 618,894 | | |
| Zafrullah Alonto | 628,797 | | |
| Nanette Espinosa | 543,986 | | |
| Regalado Maambong | 485,157 | | |
| Rizalito David | 451,089 | | |
| Shariff Ibrahim Albani | 441,637 | | |
| Israel Virgines | 411,134 | | |
| Zosimo Paredes | 394,866 | | |
| Adrian Sison | 378,130 | | |
| Reynaldo Princesa | 328,201 | | |
| Jo Aurea Imbong | 324,108 | | |
| Adz Nikabulin | 310,355 | | |
| Henry Caunan | 214,817 | | |
| Manuel Valdehuesa Jr. | 181,870 | | |
| Hector Tarrazona | 150,629 | | |
| Ma. Gracia Riñoza-Plazo | 138,189 | | |
| Alma Lood | 114,362 | | |
| As of (2010) | May 20 | May 18 | May 18 |
| Precincts reporting | 90.26% | -- | 90.20% |

== Aftermath ==
With the lineup for the 15th Congress becoming apparent, senator-elect Miriam Defensor-Santiago (PRP) commented that her ally Manuel Villar has the numbers to retake the Senate Presidency. Villar resigned from the senate presidency just prior to the election period and Juan Ponce Enrile (PMP) became the new senate president. Jockeying for the position then began with Francis Pangilinan (Liberal) announcing his intention to be senate president, citing the need for a "friendly" Senate for the Benigno Aquino III administration. The Liberals still have to agree on a candidate, as Ponce Enrile earlier said that he will not seek the post.

The Liberals apparently narrowed down their candidates to former Senate President Franklin Drilon and Pangilinan, with Villar as the Nacionalista bloc's candidate. Independent senator Francis Escudero remarked that some senators are conducting exploratory talks on who they will field for the post of Senate President.

In July 2010, the Liberal Party announced that Pangilinan will be the candidate for the Senate presidency. Pangilinan will lead in seeking alliances with other senators and said that he will not seek an alliance with the Nacionalista Party.

Perceived voting blocs in the Senate:

| Nacionalista bloc (7) | Liberal bloc (10) | "Angara bloc" (6) | Vacancy (1) |
|---|---|---|---|
| 1. Manuel Villar; 2. Alan Peter Cayetano; 3. Pia Cayetano; 4. Miriam Defensor Santiago (PRP); 5. Bongbong Marcos; 6. Loren Legarda (NPC); 7. Joker Arroyo (Lakas Kampi) | 1. Francis Pangilinan; 2. Franklin Drilon; 3. TG Guingona; 4. Ralph Recto; 5. Francis Escudero (Independent); 6. Jinggoy Estrada (PMP); 7. Juan Ponce Enrile (PMP); 8. Sergio Osmeña III (Independent); 9. Panfilo Lacson (Independent, whereabouts unknown)*; 10. Antonio Trillanes IV (Independent; detained)* | 1. Edgardo Angara (LDP); 2. Bong Revilla (Lakas Kampi); 3. Migz Zubiri (Lakas Kampi); 4. Gregorio Honasan (Independent); 5. Lito Lapid (Lakas Kampi); 6. Tito Sotto (NPC) | 1. Benigno Aquino III (Liberal; Elected president) |
Votes needed to win: 13
*It is unknown if ever Trillanes and Lacson can be able to attend the Senate session in order to vote for Pangilinan.

On July 23, previous Senate President Enrile announced that he was approached by Drilon, Recto (both Liberals) and Escudero (independent) on July 20 informing him that they will support him once he agrees to be included in the race. Enrile agreed, with the conditions that he will not actively campaign, nor enter with a "bargaining effort with anyone." Sotto (NPC) remarked that retaining Enrile emerged as a viable compromise to prevent an impasse on the opening of Congress.

Recognizing that he can't secure the required 13 votes to win the Senate Presidency, Pangilinan has withdrawn his bid on July 25. The Liberals will now support Enrile for the Senate Presidency.

=== Election for Senate President ===
With Loren Legarda nominating Enrile, he won the Senate Presidency with a vote of 17–3, defeated Alan Peter Cayetano, who was nominated by Joker Arroyo with 4 absent senators: Cayetano became the Minority Floor Leader instead.

Voted for Ponce Enrile (17)
| Edgardo Angara | LDP |
| Alan Peter Cayetano | Nacionalista |
| Franklin Drilon | Liberal |
| Francis Escudero | Independent |
| Jinggoy Estrada | PMP |
| TG Guingona | Liberal |
| Gregorio Honasan | Independent |
| Lito Lapid | Lakas–Kampi |
| Loren Legarda | NPC |
| Bongbong Marcos | Nacionalista |
| Serge Osmeña | Independent |
| Francis Pangilinan | Liberal |
| Ralph Recto | Liberal |
| Bong Revilla | Lakas–Kampi |
| Tito Sotto | NPC |
| Manny Villar | Nacionalista |
| Migz Zubiri | Lakas–Kampi |

Voted for Cayetano (3)
| Joker Arroyo | Lakas–Kampi |
| Pia Cayetano | Nacionalista |
| Juan Ponce Enrile | PMP |

Did not vote (4)
| Miriam Defensor Santiago | PRP |
| Panfilo Lacson | Independent |
| Antonio Trillanes | Independent |
| Vacant | |

Summary
| Party | Ponce Enrile | Cayetano | No vote | Total |
|---|---|---|---|---|
| LDP | 1 | 0 | 0 | 1 |
| Lakas–Kampi | 3 | 1 | 0 | 4 |
| Liberal | 4 | 0 | 0 | 4 |
| Nacionalista | 3 | 1 | 0 | 4 |
| NPC | 2 | 0 | 0 | 2 |
| PDP–Laban | 1 | 0 | 0 | 1 |
| PRP | 0 | 0 | 1 | 1 |
| PMP | 1 | 1 | 0 | 2 |
| Independents | 2 | 0 | 2 | 5 |
| Vacant | 0 | 0 | 1 | 1 |
| Totals | 17 | 3 | 4 | 24 |

== Defeated incumbents ==
All incumbents who defended their seats won.
