= Bangon Pilipinas =

Party-list in the Philippines

Bangon Pilipinas Party
- President: Eddie Villanueva
- Secretary-General: Joel Villanueva
- Founded: 2004
- Headquarters: 3rd/F Imperial Bayfront Tower, 1642 A. Mabini St., Malate, Manila
- Youth wing: Bangon Kabataan
- Ideology: Christian democracy Christian left Social conservatism
- Political position: Economics: Centre-left; Social: Centre-right
- Colors: Yellow and green
- Senate: 0 / 24
- House of Representatives: 1 / 316
- Provincial governors: 0 / 81
- Provincial vice governors: 0 / 81
- Provincial board members: 0 / 1,006

Website
- www.bangonpilipinas.ph

Bangon Pilipinas Party (BPP, lit. '"Rise Up Philippines Party"') or Bangon is a political party in the Philippines, formed in 2004 as the Bangon Pilipinas Movement. It is the political vehicle of its leader, televangelist Eddie Villanueva. Villanueva ran for president in 2004 and 2010 but lost in both elections. The party put up a senatorial slate for the 2010 elections, but none of its candidates won.

Villanueva's son, Eduardo "Jon-Jon" Villanueva, Jr., was the highest-ranking elected official of the party, serving as mayor of Bocaue, Bulacan; he ran as the Liberal Party's candidate for mayor in the 2013 elections and won.

In the 2016 Senate election, the party endorsed another Villanueva son, then TESDA Director General Joel Villanueva. He won the second-highest number of votes in that election.

== Candidates for Philippine general elections, 2010 ==
- Eddie Villanueva – Presidential Candidate (lost)
- Perfecto Yasay Jr. – Vice-Presidential Candidate (lost)

Senators:

- Kata Inocencio (lost)
- Alex Tinsay (lost)
- Imelda Papin (lost)
- Israel Virgines (lost)
- Reynaldo Princessa (lost)
- Zosimo Paredes (lost)
- Zafrullah Allonto (lost)
- Adz Nikabulin (lost)
- Ramoncito Ocampo (lost)

Local:

- Jose Angcor Jr. – Governor, Antique (lost)
- Pedro Labid – Governor, Samar (lost)
- Nur Misuari – Governor, Sulu (lost)

== Candidate for the Philippine general election, 2013 ==
Senatorial Slate (1)

- Bro. Eddie Villanueva (lost)

== Electoral performance ==
=== President ===
Election	Candidate	Number of votes for Bangon Pilipinas	Share of votes	Outcome of election
2004	Eddie Villanueva	1,988,218	6.16%	Lost
2010	Eddie Villanueva	1,125,878	3.12%	Lost
2016	N/A	N/A	N/A	Rodrigo Duterte (PDPLBN)
2022	N/A	N/A	N/A	Bongbong Marcos (PFP)

=== Vice president ===
Election	Candidate	Number of votes for Bangon Pilipinas	Share of votes	Outcome of election
2004	N/A	N/A	N/A	Noli de Castro (Ind.)
2010	Perfecto Yasay	364,652	1.04%	Lost
2016	N/A	N/A	N/A	Leni Robredo (LP)
2022	N/A	N/A	N/A	Sara Duterte (Lakas)

=== Senate ===
Election	Number of votes for Bangon Pilipinas	Share of votes	Seats won	Result
2010	6,486,749	2.2%	0 / 24	Lost
2013	6,686,774	2.33%	0 / 24	Lost
2016	No candidates; endorsed Joel Villanueva who won		0 / 24	N/A
2019	Did not participate		0 / 24	N/A

=== House of Representatives ===
Election	Number of votes for Bangon Pilipinas	Share of votes	Seats	Result
2010	11,294	0.03%	0 / 286	Lost
2013	Did not participate		0 / 293	N/A
2016	Did not participate		0 / 297	N/A
2019	Did not participate		0 / 304	N/A

=== Other ===
- Eduardo "Jon-Jon/JJV" Villanueva, Jr. is a two-termer mayor of Bocaue, Bulacan. He is the highest-ranking elected officeholder of the party.

== See also ==
- Citizens' Battle Against Corruption
