= Ramon Mitra III =

Filipino politician and former military officer

Ramon B. Mitra
- Born: Ramon Victor Antonio Blanco Mitra; October 28, 1964 (age 61); Manila, Philippines
- Other name: Mon-Mon
- Occupations: Farmer, Military Officer
- Political party: Nacionalista
- Spouse: Mary Ann D. Francisco
- Children: 4
- Parent(s): Ramon V. Mitra Jr. Cecilia A. Blanco
- Military career
- Branch: Philippine Marine Corps
- Rank: Captain
- Awards: Distinguished Conduct Star
- Education: Philippine Military Academy

Ramon "Mon-Mon" Blanco Mitra (born October 28, 1964) is the son of 1992 presidential candidate and the former Speaker of the House of Representatives Ramon Mitra Jr. and older brother of Former Palawan Governor Abraham Mitra and music director Raul Mitra.

== Early life ==
Ramon Blanco Mitra was born on October 28, 1964, in Puerto Princesa to Ramon Mitra Jr. and Cecilia Blanco. He is the third son of six siblings.

== Education ==
Mitra, a 1988 graduate of the Philippine Military Academy who served as a captain in the Philippine Marine Corps, is a recipient of the country's second-highest award for gallantry, the Distinguished Conduct Star.

== Political life ==
In 2009, it was announced that Mitra would be a Nacionalista Party (NP) senatorial bet for the 2010 Philippine Senate election, but he failed to secure enough votes to win a seat in the Senate. In 2013, he ran for congressman for the 2nd district of Palawan, but lost.
