= Hector Tarrazona =

Filipino colonel and politician (born 1944)

Hector M.Tarrazona
- Born: November 26, 1944 (age 81); Cabatuan, Iloilo, Philippines
- Education: Central Philippine University; Ateneo de Manila University; Asian Institute of Management; Naval Postgraduate School
- Military career
- Allegiance: Republic of the Philippines
- Branch: Philippine Air Force
- Service years: 1968-1989
- Rank: Colonel
- Nickname: Tarzan
- Commands: Armed Forces of the Philippines

Hector M. Tarrazona (born 1944), is a former Philippine Air Force colonel and a founding member of the Reform the Armed Forces Movement (RAM). In the May 10, 2010, elections, Tarrazona ran as a senatorial candidate under the Ang Kapatiran Party banner, and was supported by the Roman Catholic Church, along with Rizalito David, Jo Aurea Imbong, Adrian Sison, Reginald Tamayo, and Manuel Valdehuesa Jr.

== Early years ==
Tarrazona was born on 26 November 1944 in Cabatuan, Iloilo. He graduated salutatorian of his batch in high school then attended Central Philippine University from 1962 to 1964 and studied civil engineering.

== Military and political career ==
In 1964, he went to the Philippine Military Academy, and graduated with the Class of '68.

In 1970, he took an undergraduate pilot training in the Philippine Air Force Flying School in Fernando Air Base in Lipa, Batangas; and in 1982, he went to Monterey, California, U.S.A. to study International Defense Management at the Naval Postgraduate School.

He went back to the Philippines and finished his master's degree in Business Administration.

Tarrazona also taught the courses, Intelligence Officer Basic Course and Military Intelligence Collection Course at the Special Intelligence Training School. Concurrent during his service years, Col. Tarrazona was also vice president and general manager of Rajah Broadcasting Network (DZRJ) from 1983 to 1985, and from 1986 to 1987. He was external vice president and general manager of the Armed Forces of the Philippines General Insurance Corporation.

In the formation of the Reform the Armed Forces Movement (RAM), Tarrazona was elected to the 11-man Executive Committee. In January 1986, Tarrazona was one of the seven military officers who announced the formation of the Reformed Armed Forces Movement (RAM). It was also Tarrazona who called on Col. Antonio Sotelo, of the 15th Strike Wing in Villamor Air Base during the height of the People Power Revolution, and convinced the latter to support the revolution against the dictator Pres. Ferdinand Marcos. The switching of the 15th Strike Wing to the rebel camp was one of the crucial moments of the revolution.

After the 1987 coup attempts against the Aquino administration, Col. Tarrazona was suspected involvement and ordered arrested. Tarrazona denied this and was later released.

== Later life ==
In 1991, he attended the Ateneo de Manila University and later the Asian Institute of Management where he received his master's degree in Development Management.

From 1991 to 1992, he was the senior vice president for comptroller-ship of the Armed Forces and Police Savings and Loan Association, Inc. (AFPSLAI). He was president of the AFP Officers Village Association, Inc., from 1991 to 1994 and then in 2003 to 2006. From 1995 to 1996, he was vice president for Corporate Planning and Business Development of Primetown Property Group, Inc.; from 1997 to 1998, he was chief operating officer and general manager of Public Safety Mutual Benefit Fund Inc.; and from 2001 to 2002, he was president of Riviera Sports and Country Club.

Tarrazona founded the Child Development and Guidance Center Cooperative where he served as vice chairman. He was also the financial and management consultant of the following companies: Rajah Broadcasting Network, Miralles Furniture, Air Materiel Wing Savings and Loan Association, Inc. (AMWSLAI), Public Safety Mutual Benefit Fund, Inc. (PSMBFI,) GMA Channel 7, and Velprint Corporation. He also served as assistant chief of Air Staff for Civil Military Operations, chief of the military personnel branch under the office of the Assistant Secretary for Administration, and senior military assistant to the Secretary of National Defense.

Tarrazona is currently the consultant/chief of the Airmen Examination Board at the Civil Aviation Authority of the Philippines.

Tarrazona also authored After EDSA, a book on his personal account of the EDSA Revolution and his views on the problems of the Filipino society. He occasionally writes articles for the Cavalier Magazine of the PMA Alumni Association, Inc.

== See also ==
- Reform the Armed Forces Movement
- Philippine Air Force
