= Ang Kapatiran =

Political party in the Philippines

- President: Norman Cabrera
- Chairman: Edilberto Cuenca
- Founder: Reynaldo Pacheco
- Founded: 2004
- Headquarters: Intramuros, Manila
- Ideology: Conservatism; Social conservatism Christian democracy
- Political position: Centre-right to right-wing
- National affiliation: TRoPa (2022)
- Senate: 0 / 24
- House of Representatives: 0 / 316
- Provincial governors: 0 / 82
- Provincial vice governors: 0 / 82

Website
- www.kapatiranparty.org

Ang Kapatiran Party (AKP, lit. 'The Brotherhood Party'), also known as the Alliance for the Common Good, is a political party in the Philippines founded by Reynaldo "Nandy" Pacheco in 2004. The party participated in the 2007 elections and was not affiliated with either major coalition.

== History ==
=== New officers ===
On September 26, 2007, the AKP nominated new officers. Renato H. Peronilla, was appointed as the president, replacing Mario E. Ongkiko. Manolo K. Dayrit became chair and David S. Lim, vice chair. Benjamin P. de Guzman became the vice president, Eric B. Manalang, secretary general, Amador F. Astudillo and Rafael Q. Enriquez, deputy secretaries general, and Ricardo G. Librea the treasurer. Pacheco remained the founder and chair emeritus.

== Beliefs and ideologies ==
The AKP's political and social ideology is based on "Traditional Papal" (Catholic) beliefs and is opposed to abortion, divorce, and religious intolerance.

== Electoral candidacies ==
=== 2007 Philippine Senate elections ===
The 2007 Senate elections had three AKP candidates:

- Zosimo Paredes, former executive director for Presidential Commission on the Visiting Forces Agreement.
- Dr. Martin Bautista, a gastroenterologist who spent past 17 years working in the United States.
- Adrian Sison, a tax and family law attorney.

=== 2010 Philippine general election ===
On October 1, 2008, the party launched its campaign for the 2010 general election in Iloilo City at the national convention of the Philippines' Pontifical Council for the Laity. Party secretary-general Eric Manalang announced AKP would field 4,020 candidates, focused on 200 towns and cities with the largest percentage of young voters. AKP fielded 30 candidates in the 2007 Philippine general election, but only John Carlos de los Reyes won as Olongapo City councilor.

On March 4, 2010, senatorial candidate Zosimo Paredes transferred to the Bangon Pilipinas Party of Bro. Eddie Villanueva.

=== Candidates ===
- President – Coun. John Carlos "JC" de los Reyes (lost)
- Vice-President – Atty. Dominador "Jun" Chipeco, Jr. (lost)
- Senator
  - Manuel "Manny" Valdehuesa (lost)
  - Col. Hector "Tarzan" Tarrazona (Ret.) PAF (lost)
  - Atty. Jo Aurea "Jo" Imbong (lost)
  - Atty. Grace Riñoza-Plazo (lost)
  - Coun. Reginald "Regie" Tamayo (lost)
  - Mr. Rizalito "Lito" David (lost)
  - Atty. Adrian Sison (lost)

=== Senatorial Candidates ===
- Rizalito David (lost)
- John Carlos "JC" delos Reyes (lost)
- Marwil Llasos (lost)

=== 2016 Philippine general election ===
The party began the campaign for the 2016 Philippine General Elections on June 24, 2015. On October 12, 2015, Rizalito "Lito" David who previously ran for senate in the party in 2010 and 2013, filed his Certificate of Candidacy as presidential candidate of the party, with Albert Alba as his running mate. Alba is a certified public accountant who previously worked for SyCip Gorres Velayo & Co.. On October 15, 2015, the party's six senatorial candidates filed their Certificates of Candidacy. In a press conference on October 26, the party officially announced that they would not endorse their candidates because the AKP planned to boycott the elections and advocate for change into the parliamentary system and to bring federalism in the country. After David announced that candidates would instead run under the newly established Koalisyong Katoliko Kristiyano party as the AKP's successor, the party expelled David and Alba. The electoral commission ruled David a nuisance candidate and disqualified him and Alba.

=== 2022 Philippine general election ===
Though initially announcing on September 25, 2021 that Alex Lacson would be the party's standard bearer for the vice presidency, Lacson withdrew his vice presidential candidacy in favor of Kiko Pangilinan and ran instead for senator. He was then eventually included in the Team Robredo-Pangilinan (TRoPa) senatorial slate. Lacson eventually lost his second bid for the Senate, placing 25th of 64 candidates with 5,477,088 votes and 9.86% vote share based on 172 of 173 certificates of canvass.

On the local level, Ang Kapatiran fielded candidates in Las Piñas, Batangas City, Batangas, and in Luisiana, Laguna. Among them, only Raya Fe Arca, who ran for Luisiana, Laguna councilor, won.

=== Candidates ===
- Senator
  - Alex Lacson
- House of Representatives
  - Louie Redoble (Las Piñas at-large)
  - Luisito Ruiz (Batangas-1st)
  - Carlito Bisa (Batangas-5th)
- Mayor
  - Rey Rivera (Las Piñas)
  - Edu Garcia (Batangas City, Batangas)
- Vice Mayor
  - Jerry Delos Reyes (Las Piñas)
- Councilor
  - Anabelle Rondilla (Las Piñas-1st)
  - Abet Goco (Las Piñas-2nd)
  - Raya Fe Arca (Luisiana, Laguna)

== Electoral performance ==
=== Presidential and vice presidential elections ===
Year	Presidential election			Vice presidential election		
Year	Candidate	Vote share	Result	Candidate	Vote share	Result
2010	John Carlos de los Reyes	0.12%	Benigno Aquino III (Liberal)	Dominador Chipeco Jr.	0.15%	Jejomar Binay (PDP–Laban)
2016	Rizalito David (Note: David was disqualified from the presidential race.)	N/A	Rodrigo Duterte (PDP–Laban)	Albert Alba (Note: Alba was disqualified from the vice presidential race.)	N/A	Leni Robredo (Liberal)
2022	None (Note: Ang Kapatiran supported Leni Robredo's presidential bid.)		Bongbong Marcos (PFP)	None (Note: Ang Kapatiran supported Kiko Pangilinan's vice presidential bid.)		Sara Duterte (Lakas-CMD)

=== Legislative elections ===
Congress of the Philippines
House of Representatives			Senate			
Year	Seats won	Result	Year	Seats won	Ticket	Result
2007	Did not participate	Lakas plurality	2007	0 / 12	Single party ticket	Genuine Opposition win 8/12 seats
2010	0 / 286	Lakas plurality	2010	0 / 12	Single party ticket	Liberal Party win 4/12 seats
2013	0 / 293	Liberal Party plurality	2013	0 / 12	Single party ticket	Team PNoy win 9/12 seats
2016	Did not participate	Liberal Party plurality	2016	Did not participate		Koalisyon ng Daang Matuwid win 7/12 seats
2019	Did not participate	PDP–Laban plurality	2019	Did not participate		Hugpong ng Pagbabago win 9/12 seats
2022	0 / 316	PDP–Laban plurality	2022	0 / 12	TRoPa	UniTeam win 6/12 seats
