= Lakas–CMD =

Christian democratic political party in the Philippines

Lakas–Christian Muslim Democrats
- President: Martin Romualdez
- Chairperson: Bong Revilla Jr.
- Secretary-General: Jose Aquino II
- Chairwoman Emerita: Gloria Macapagal Arroyo
- Founder: Fidel Ramos; Raul Manglapus
- Merger of: Lakas–CMD and KAMPI
- Headquarters: 3/F, Universal Re Building, 106 Paseo de Roxas, Legazpi Village, Makati, 1229 Metro Manila
- Ideology: Conservatism; Filipino nationalism Christian democracy Islamic democracy Neoliberalism; Social market economy 2008–2010: Thaksinomics
- Political position: Centre-right
- National affiliation: Bagong Pilipinas (2024–present); UniTeam (2021–2024); Coalition for Change (2016–2021)
- International affiliation: Centrist Democrat International
- Colors: Sky blue, gold, green, orange
- Senate: 1 / 24
- House of Representatives: 75 / 318
- Provincial governors: 13 / 82
- Provincial vice governors: 22 / 82
- Provincial board members: 167 / 840

Website
- lakascmd.com

Lakas–Christian Muslim Democrats (Lakas–CMD), also known simply as Lakas, and previously known as Lakas–Kampi until 2011, is a political party in the Philippines. Since the 2022 elections, Lakas–CMD is currently the biggest party in the House of Representatives. The party also was a dominant member of the Alyansa para sa Bagong Pilipinas during the 2025 Philippine general election.

Lakas–CMD has produced one president, Gloria Macapagal Arroyo, and one vice president, Sara Duterte.

The political party was founded in 2008 after the original Lakas–CMD merged with the Kabalikat ng Malayang Pilipino (KAMPI), forming Lakas–Kampi–CMD. The party later reverted to its original name and removed KAMPI after many of its members defected to the National Unity Party (NUP).

After the 2010 elections, the party was split into both the majority and minority blocs. By 2013, Lakas supported most candidates of the opposition coalition United Nationalist Alliance (UNA) in the 2013 Senate election, although the party was still split. After the 2016 elections, the party joined the majority bloc led by PDP–Laban. In the 2019 elections, the party joined the Hugpong ng Pagbabago alliance. After the 2022 elections, Lakas won the vice presidency and replaced PDP–Laban as the largest party in Congress, leading the majority bloc.

== History ==
=== Origins ===
After the Hello Garci scandal, the party was split into two main factions in 2006, one led by President Gloria Macapagal Arroyo and another by former president Fidel V. Ramos, who had initially supported Arroyo despite the scandal but later called for her resignation.

On January 16, 2008, Lakas spokesman and legal counsel Raul Lambino released a list of potential Lakas senatorial bets for 2010. Except for Parañaque Representative Eduardo Zialcita, they were not yet identified.

Former House Speaker Jose de Venecia Jr. resigned his post as president of Lakas on March 10, 2008; he rejected the proposition of former president Fidel Ramos to give him the title Chairman-emeritus. The then current House Speaker Prospero Nograles was sworn in as the new party president of Lakas and Feliciano Belmonte Jr. as vice president for Metro Manila affairs on the same day.

On June 18, 2008, President Arroyo confirmed the merger of the original Lakas–Christian Muslim Democrats (Lakas–CMD/Lakas) and the Kabalikat ng Malayang Pilipino (KAMPI) parties. Both parties adopted the "equity of the incumbent" principle, as the merger would account for almost 200 national and 8,000 local officials, amid Arroyo's prediction of 2010 elections victory. The party's president, Prospero Nograles, and KAMPI chairperson, Ronaldo Puno, signed the covenant at the Davao City regional caucus. Ramos announced on February 6, 2008, that the Lakas–CMD name would be retained even after the merger, and asserted that de Venecia will remain as the party's president.

On August 9, 2009, de Venecia and Ramos led fifty members from Lakas in objecting to its merger with KAMPI on May 28, 2009. The faction retained de Venecia its president with Ramos as the Chairman Emeritus. Ramos refused the offer to become the Chairman Emeritus of the new party after being named in the interim party organization. De Venecia filed a resolution at the Commission on Elections to declare the merger null and void. However, the Supreme Court ultimately upheld the legality of the merger, citing the failure of de Venecia "to sufficiently show that any grave abuse of discretion was committed by the Commission on Elections in rendering the challenged resolution."

=== 2009 Lakas nomination: Teodoro vs Fernando ===
==== Possible Candidates ====
By 2008, MMDA Chairman Bayani Fernando wants to get the nomination of the party, but some party members want to field then-Vice President Noli de Castro, or former House Speaker Sonny Belmonte as nominee. Senator Dick Gordon also considered if de Castro declined. But Parañaque Congressman Eduardo Zialcita said that the party did not have popular of "winnable" candidate for presidency, and also stated that de Castro declined to join the party.

In 2009, Defense Secretary Gilbert "Gibo" Teodoro resigned from his uncle's NPC to sworn in as new member of newly merged Lakas–Kampi. Teodoro's admission to Lakas will be a possible sign for seeking nomination for president. Former PNP chief and DPWH Secretary Hermogenes "Jun" Ebdane, even though not a party member, wants to seek party nomination. Actor and Senator Bong Revilla was rumored to be the party's nominee. In September of that year, Teodoro submits his name to the party nomination process. Fernando insisted that the party should choose an "original" and "loyal" member. Also in the same month, former Speaker and party co-founder de Venecia said that the newly merged party can't field any candidates because the party did not have already been recognized officially by COMELEC. The party also shortlisted the party's choices between Teodoro and Fernando.

==== Teodoro officially selected ====
In October, when Teodoro was rumored to be picked, Ronaldo Puno was poised to be his running mate. In November, Teodoro was officially picked by his party as nominee for presidential election in 2010. Teodoro picked actor, TV host, and former Makati Vice Mayor Edu Manzano as his running mate. Fernando will bolt out and run as vice president.

=== Majority to minority (2010–2016) ===
In the 2010 elections, the party suffered several losses, and was split into both the majority and minority blocs. It lost the 2010 presidential election with Gilberto Teodoro as its presidential nominee while only two of its candidates in the 2010 Senate election won; the two joined the Liberal Party–led majority coalition. In the 2010 House of Representatives election, it won 47% of the seats contested in the district election. However, after Teodoro's cousin Benigno Aquino III of Liberal was sworn in as president on June 30, 2010, the majority of the former legislative members of Lakas were sworn as members of the Liberal reborn, Aquino's party. Other members from Kampi faction led by Pablo P. Garcia established the neutral National Unity Party (NUP) in December 2010. After the split, the party's new chairman, Edcel Lagman, declared that the Lakas–Kampi coalition has "ceased to exist". On May 11, 2012, the party decided to revert to its original name and drop Arroyo's KAMPI from the coalition. It became one of the parties in the opposition after the 2010 elections.

The party weakened following Arroyo's arrest under charges of electoral fraud in 2011 which were later dismissed, and again in 2012, on charges of misuse of $8.8 million in state lottery funds; she would later be acquitted in 2017. On February 5, 2013, senator Bong Revilla succeeded Lagman and became the party's chairperson, while 1st district representative of Leyte, Martin Romualdez, became the party's president. In the 2013 Senate election, the party mostly supported several candidates from the United Nationalist Alliance (UNA), which counts previous Lakas members among its candidates, such as Migz Zubiri, Dick Gordon, and Congresswoman Mitos Magsaysay. Three out of nine UNA candidates were elected.

In 2016, the party initially planned to field senator Revilla for the presidential election. However, he would be detained at the Philippine National Police custodial center at Camp Crame due to his alleged involvement in the pork barrel scam. By August 2015, Lakas reportedly eyed to form an alliance with UNA and support vice president Jejomar Binay's candidacy for president. However, by February 2016, the party failed to reach a consensus on who to support, eventually opting not to endorse any candidate for president. The party supported the candidacy of Bongbong Marcos for vice president, who lost.

=== Recovery under the Duterte administration (2016–2022) ===
After then Davao City mayor Rodrigo Duterte won the presidential election, Lakas signed a coalition agreement with Duterte's party, PDP–Laban, on May 18, 2016, joining several other political parties in the Coalition for Change, the administration's coalition. In October 2017, Arroyo and two of her allies joined PDP–Laban. According to Arroyo, the move was done to "consolidate support for the president." In September 2018, House Minority Leader Danilo Suarez, who had rejoined Lakas, announced that the party is rebuilding to restore its dominance before Arroyo stepped down as president. On November 6, 2018, the party joined Hugpong ng Pagbabago, with Revilla joining the coalition's senatorial slate for the 2019 Senate election. Revilla was reelected, marking Lakas' return to the upper chamber. The party also won a dozen seats in the 2019 House of Representatives elections. After the 2019 elections, several politicians joined the party. Arroyo returned to the party on March 9, 2020.

On November 17, 2021, Sara Duterte became the chairperson of the party, succeeding Revilla. Following her move to Lakas, she announced her candidacy for vice president in the 2022 vice presidential election, becoming the running mate of Bongbong Marcos. On November 29, 2021, the party formed the UniTeam alliance with three other parties to support the candidacies of Marcos and Duterte. The tandem won the elections, becoming the first presidential ticket to win together since Arroyo's victory along with her running mate in 2004.

=== Return to dominance (2022–present) ===
Following the 2022 Philippine general election, which saw Lakas winning 26 seats in the House of Representatives as well as the vice presidency, 38 politicians moved to the party, most of whom belonged to the weakening PDP–Laban. By the time the 19th Congress was opened, the party's seats in the House of Representatives increased from 12 in the 18th Congress to 64, replacing PDP–Laban as the dominant party in the lower house. Prominent members of the party were elected to various leadership positions in the lower house; Romualdez was elected as the House Speaker while Arroyo and Isidro Ungab became deputy speakers. As of May 2023, the party has 71 members in the lower chamber.

On May 17, 2023, Arroyo was demoted from senior deputy speaker to deputy speaker, reportedly due to her plotting to oust Romualdez from his position. Arroyo has subsequently denied the allegations. She was replaced by Aurelio Gonzales Jr. of PDP–Laban. The party later also signed a partnership agreement with PDP–Laban. Following Arroyo's demotion, vice president and party chair Duterte resigned from the party on May 19, 2023. She stated that her leadership "cannot be poisoned by political toxicity."

== Ideology ==
Lakas–CMD adheres to the Christian democracy and Islamic democracy ideologies, adopting the same ideologies of its predecessor party, and is a member of the Centrist Democrats International (CDI). The party also advocates for a shift from the present presidential system to a parliamentary form of government through constitutional amendments and through establishing peace talks with Muslim separatists and communist rebels.

Lakas–CMD has always focused on economic growth and development, stronger ties with the United States and Canada, creation of jobs, and strong cooperation between the executive and legislative branches of government. The party is distinct in its ecumenical inclusion of Muslim leaders in its political alliance. The party has tended to be more popular in the Mindanao provinces, and pushes for federalism of the country.

== List of Party officials ==
=== Current party officials ===
- Chairwoman Emeritus: Gloria Macapagal Arroyo
- National President: Martin Romualdez
- Executive Vice President: Mannix Dalipe
- Chairperson: Bong Revilla Jr.
- Vice chairperson:Fredenil Castro
- Secretary-General: Jose Aquino II
- Treasurer: David Suarez

=== List of party presidents ===
- Eduardo Ermita (2008–2012)
- Gloria Macapagal Arroyo (2009–2012)
- Bong Revilla (2012–2013)
- Martin Romualdez (2013–present)

=== List of party chairpersons ===
- Gloria Macapagal Arroyo (2008–2009)
- Gilberto Teodoro (2009–2010)
- Amelita Villarosa (2010)
- Gloria Macapagal Arroyo (2010–2011)
- Edcel Lagman (2011–2012)
- Bong Revilla Jr. (2012–2021)
- Sara Duterte (2021–2023)
- Bong Revilla Jr. (2023–present)

== Candidates for Philippine general elections ==
=== 2010 ===
==== Presidential ticket ====
- Gilbert Teodoro for president – lost
- Edu Manzano for vice president – lost

==== For senator ====
- Silvestre Bello III – lost
- Ramon Guico Jr. – lost
- Prospero Pichay Jr. - lost
- Raul Lambino – lost
- Rey Langit – lost
- Lito Lapid – won
- Bong Revilla – won

=== 2016 ===
==== For senator ====
- Greco Belgica (candidate for PDP–Laban and PRP coalition) – lost
- Romeo Maganto – lost
- Edu Manzano (candidate for Partido Galing at Puso and PRP coalition) – lost
- Martin Romualdez (candidate for United Nationalist Alliance and PRP coalition) – lost

=== 2019 ===
==== For senator ====
- Bong Revilla (also running under Hugpong ng Pagbabago) – won
- Willie Ong – lost
- Larry Gadon (guest candidate from Kilusang Bagong Lipunan and Katipunan ng Demokratikong Pilipino) – lost

=== 2022 ===
==== Presidential ticket ====
- Bongbong Marcos for president (adopted candidate from the Partido Federal ng Pilipinas) – won
- Sara Duterte for vice president – won

=== 2025 ===
==== For senator ====
Running under Alyansa para sa Bagong Pilipinas

- Bong Revilla – lost
- Erwin Tulfo – won

== Election results ==
=== Presidential elections ===
Year	Candidate	Votes	%	Result	Outcome
2010	Gilbert Teodoro	4,095,839	11.33	Lost	Benigno Aquino III (Liberal) won
2016	None			—N/a	Rodrigo Duterte (PDP–Laban) won
2022	None; Duterte's running mate was Bongbong Marcos (PFP)	31,629,783	58.77	Won	Bongbong Marcos (PFP) won

=== Vice presidential elections ===
Year	Candidate	Votes	%	Result	Outcome
2010	Edu Manzano	807,728	2.30	Lost	Jejomar Binay (PDP–Laban) won
2016	None; endorsed Bongbong Marcos (Independent)			—N/a	Leni Robredo (Liberal) won
2022	Sara Duterte	32,208,417	61.53	Won	Sara Duterte won

=== Legislative elections ===
Year	House Seats won	+/–	Result	Year	Senate Seats won	+/–	Result
2010	106 / 286	▼16	Split	2010	2 / 12	▼2	Split
2013	14 / 292	▼92	Split	2013	Did not participate	▼2	Minority
2016	4 / 297	▼10	Majority	2016	0 / 12	▼2	Lost
2019	12 / 304	▲8	Majority	2019	1 / 12	▲1	Majority
2022	26 / 316	▲14	Majority	2022	Did not participate	0	Majority
2025	103 / 317	▲77	Majority	2025	1 / 12	0	Majority

== Membership ==
The following are the oath taken by new members of Lakas:

I, (name), having been accepted as a member of Lakas–CMD, do solemnly swear that I shall faithfully discharge all the duties and obligations, and obey all rules and regulations imposed upon by in the party. Let us all engage in peaceful dealing in democratic pursuit and exercising political power. That I shall actively to promote the ideals and programs of the party and exclusively support the campaign for the official candidates of the party in all elections. These I pledged freely and impose upon myself without mental reservation or purpose of evasion. [So help me God.]

== See also ==
- List of political parties in the Philippines
- Politics of the Philippines
- List of Christian democratic parties
- List of Islamic political parties
