= 2010 Ilocos Region local elections =

Local elections in the Philippines

Local elections were held in the Ilocos Region on May 10, 2010, as part of the 2010 Philippine general election.

== Dagupan ==
=== Mayor ===
Incumbent Mayor Alipio Fernandez Jr. of the Liberal Party ran for re-election to a second term, but was defeated by former mayor Benjamin Lim of the Nacionalista Party.

Candidate	Party	Votes	%
Benjamin Lim	Nacionalista Party	37,061	51.83
Alipio Fernandez Jr.	Liberal Party	34,443	48.17
Total		71,504	100.00
Valid votes		71,504	97.59
Invalid/blank votes		1,767	2.41
Total votes		73,271	100.00
Nacionalista Party gain from Liberal Party			
Source: Commission on Elections

=== Vice Mayor ===
Incumbent Vice Mayor Belen Fernandez of Liberal Party won re-election to a second term.

Candidate	Party	Votes	%
Belen Fernandez	Liberal Party	54,421	78.79
Danilo Torio	Nacionalista Party	14,652	21.21
Total		69,073	100.00
Valid votes		69,073	94.27
Invalid/blank votes		4,198	5.73
Total votes		73,271	100.00
Liberal Party hold			
Source: Commission on Elections

=== City Council ===
The Dagupan City Council is composed of 12 councilors, 10 of whom are elected.

Party	Votes	%	Seats
Liberal Party	283,984	49.78	7
Nacionalista Party	198,824	34.85	2
Nationalist People's Coalition	61,143	10.72	1
Independent	26,563	4.66	0
Total	570,514	100.00	10
Total votes	73,271	–	
Source: Commission on Elections

Candidate	Party	Votes	%
Maybelyn Rose Fernandez	Liberal Party	47,087	8.25
Marc Brian Lim	Nacionalista Party	43,569	7.64
Jesus Canto	Liberal Party	40,435	7.09
Karlos Liberato Reyna IV	Liberal Party	39,484	6.92
Maria Librada Fe Reyna	Nationalist People's Coalition	38,619	6.77
Jeslito Seen	Liberal Party	37,904	6.64
Alipio Serafin Fernandez	Liberal Party	33,432	5.86
Luis Samson Jr.	Liberal Party	31,320	5.49
Redford Christian Erfe-Mejia	Nacionalista Party	29,289	5.13
Alvin Coquia	Liberal Party	27,790	4.87
Alfredo Quinto Sr.	Liberal Party	26,532	4.65
Nelson Cuison	Nacionalista Party	25,319	4.44
Alex de Venecia	Nationalist People's Coalition	22,524	3.95
Guillermo Vallejos	Nacionalista Party	19,946	3.50
Alfonso Llamas Jr.	Nacionalista Party	19,091	3.35
Jestoni Aquino	Nacionalista Party	14,431	2.53
Butch Cardinal Torio	Nacionalista Party	14,236	2.50
Michael Sim	Independent	12,395	2.17
Joseph Anthony Manaois	Nacionalista Party	11,977	2.10
Ronald Allan Sison	Nacionalista Party	11,438	2.00
Leodovico Paragas	Nacionalista Party	9,528	1.67
Roberto Salayog	Independent	5,986	1.05
Tito Perez	Independent	3,854	0.68
Ignacio dela Cruz Jr.	Independent	1,924	0.34
Evesmichael Aguila	Independent	1,259	0.22
Arsenio Jake Flores	Independent	1,145	0.20
Total		570,514	100.00
Total votes		73,271	–
Source: Commission on Elections

== Ilocos Norte ==
=== Governor ===
Incumbent governor Michael Marcos Keon of Lakas–Kampi–CMD ran for re-election to a second term, but was defeated by former representative Imee Marcos of the Nacionalista Party.

Candidate	Party	Votes	%
Imee Marcos	Nacionalista Party	196,160	69.34
Michael Marcos Keon	Lakas–Kampi–CMD	86,005	30.40
Lucidia Flores	Independent	741	0.26
Total		282,906	100.00
Valid votes		282,906	95.54
Invalid/blank votes		13,216	4.46
Total votes		296,122	100.00
Nacionalista Party gain from Lakas–Kampi–CMD			
Source: Commission on Elections

=== Vice Governor ===
Incumbent Vice Governor Windell Chua of Kilusang Bagong Lipunan was term-limited. Provincial board member Eugenio Angelo Barba of Lakas–Kampi–CMD won the election.

Candidate	Party	Votes	%
Eugenio Angelo Barba	Lakas–Kampi–CMD	131,755	55.51
Yvonne Ranada	Nacionalista Party	105,588	44.49
Total		237,343	100.00
Valid votes		237,343	80.15
Invalid/blank votes		58,779	19.85
Total votes		296,122	100.00
Lakas–Kampi–CMD gain from Kilusang Bagong Lipunan			
Source: Commission on Elections

=== Provincial Board ===
The Ilocos Norte Provincial Board is composed of 13 board members, 10 of whom are elected.

Party	Votes	%	Seats
Nacionalista Party	295,202	35.64	4
Lakas–Kampi–CMD	136,523	16.48	2
Kilusang Bagong Lipunan	95,970	11.59	1
Liberal Party	46,565	5.62	0
Independent	253,970	30.66	3
Total	828,230	100.00	10
Total votes	296,122	–	
Source: Commission on Elections

==== 1st district ====
Candidate	Party	Votes	%
Portia Pamela Salenda	Nacionalista Party	58,734	13.86
Fidel Cimatu Jr.	Kilusang Bagong Lipunan	58,042	13.70
Rogelio Balbag	Independent	54,086	12.76
Juan Conrado Respicio II	Nacionalista Party	47,755	11.27
Vicentito Lazo	Nacionalista Party	39,258	9.26
Melvin de la Cuesta	Kilusang Bagong Lipunan	36,070	8.51
Gloria Peralta	Liberal Party	34,079	8.04
Aristotelis George Calope	Nacionalista Party	30,891	7.29
Eric Enrique Ong	Lakas–Kampi–CMD	30,140	7.11
Emilio Llanes	Liberal Party	9,053	2.14
Robert Ruiz	Independent	7,747	1.83
Venerando Valdez	Independent	6,627	1.56
Elmar Ruiz Jr.	Lakas–Kampi–CMD	6,041	1.43
Alan Benigno	Liberal Party	3,433	0.81
Feliciano Guiang	Kilusang Bagong Lipunan	1,858	0.44
Total		423,814	100.00
Total votes		151,319	–
Source: Commission on Elections

==== 2nd district ====
Candidate	Party	Votes	%
Mariano Marcos II	Independent	80,015	19.79
Ma. Elena Nalupta	Lakas–Kampi–CMD	54,598	13.50
Joel Garcia	Independent	46,685	11.54
Domingo Ambrocio Jr.	Nacionalista Party	45,794	11.32
Ramon Gaoat	Lakas–Kampi–CMD	45,744	11.31
Roberto Castro	Nacionalista Party	41,332	10.22
Ferdinand Ignacio	Independent	35,924	8.88
Julio Cabacungan	Nacionalista Party	31,438	7.77
Juanito Antonio	Independent	22,886	5.66
Total		404,416	100.00
Total votes		144,803	–
Source: Commission on Elections

== Ilocos Sur ==
=== Governor ===
Incumbent governor Deogracias Victor Savellano of Lakas–Kampi–CMD ran for Vice Governor of Ilocos Sur. Lakas–Kampi–CMD nominated former governor Chavit Singson, who won the election.

Candidate	Party	Votes	%
Chavit Singson	Lakas–Kampi–CMD	199,215	64.91
Efren Rafanan	Pwersa ng Masang Pilipino	107,712	35.09
Total		306,927	100.00
Valid votes		306,927	93.91
Invalid/blank votes		19,904	6.09
Total votes		326,831	100.00
Lakas–Kampi–CMD hold			
Source: Commission on Elections

=== Vice Governor ===
Incumbent Vice Governor Jerry Singson of Lakas–Kampi–CMD ran for the Ilocos Sur Provincial Board in the 1st district. Lakas–Kampi–CMD nominated governor Deogracias Victor Savellano, who won the election.

Candidate	Party	Votes	%
Deogracias Victor Savellano	Lakas–Kampi–CMD	232,028	86.28
Romeo Hidalgo	Pwersa ng Masang Pilipino	24,272	9.03
Ruben Marzan	Liberal Party	12,638	4.70
Total		268,938	100.00
Valid votes		268,938	82.29
Invalid/blank votes		57,893	17.71
Total votes		326,831	100.00
Lakas–Kampi–CMD hold			
Source: Commission on Elections

=== Provincial Board ===
The Ilocos Sur Provincial Board is composed of 13 board members, 10 of whom are elected.

Party	Votes	%	Seats
Lakas–Kampi–CMD	740,717	74.63	10
Pwersa ng Masang Pilipino	64,565	6.51	0
Liberal Party	59,700	6.02	0
Independent	127,499	12.85	0
Total	992,481	100.00	10
Total votes	326,831	–	
Source: Commission on Elections

==== 1st district ====
Candidate	Party	Votes	%
Christian Purisima	Lakas–Kampi–CMD	84,721	19.44
Jerry Singson	Lakas–Kampi–CMD	82,349	18.89
Ismael Baterina	Lakas–Kampi–CMD	71,482	16.40
Ronnie Rapanut	Lakas–Kampi–CMD	57,501	13.19
Orlino Tesoro	Lakas–Kampi–CMD	47,315	10.86
Raul Encarnacion	Independent	28,883	6.63
Cesar Brillantes	Liberal Party	21,917	5.03
Aquiles Udarbe Jr.	Independent	18,204	4.18
Marjorie de Leon	Pwersa ng Masang Pilipino	9,505	2.18
Romeo Acena	Pwersa ng Masang Pilipino	4,109	0.94
Jose Ines	Pwersa ng Masang Pilipino	3,788	0.87
Gerardo Fieldad	Pwersa ng Masang Pilipino	3,145	0.72
Aurelio Cabanilla	Pwersa ng Masang Pilipino	2,917	0.67
Total		435,836	100.00
Total votes		139,789	–
Source: Commission on Elections

==== 2nd district ====
Candidate	Party	Votes	%
Charmian Zaragoza	Lakas–Kampi–CMD	100,321	18.02
Robert Tudayan	Lakas–Kampi–CMD	91,716	16.48
Joselle Gironella	Lakas–Kampi–CMD	79,166	14.22
Jose Bunoan Jr.	Lakas–Kampi–CMD	70,727	12.71
Teresita Cordero	Lakas–Kampi–CMD	55,419	9.96
Raymond Balbin	Independent	41,065	7.38
John Garcia	Liberal Party	37,783	6.79
Francisco Bona Jr.	Independent	33,564	6.03
Ceferino Gironella	Pwersa ng Masang Pilipino	18,955	3.41
Teodoro Anno	Pwersa ng Masang Pilipino	8,663	1.56
Arthur Sabalburo	Independent	5,783	1.04
Benedicto dela Cruz	Pwersa ng Masang Pilipino	5,712	1.03
Enrique Canosa	Pwersa ng Masang Pilipino	3,887	0.70
Elmer Callejo	Pwersa ng Masang Pilipino	3,884	0.70
Total		556,645	100.00
Total votes		187,042	–
Source: Commission on Elections

== La Union ==
=== Governor ===
Incumbent Governor Manuel Ortega of the Nationalist People's Coalition won re-election to a second term.

Candidate	Party	Votes	%
Manuel Ortega	Nationalist People's Coalition	250,821	74.42
Tomas Dumpit	Independent	86,198	25.58
Total		337,019	100.00
Valid votes		337,019	94.08
Invalid/blank votes		21,207	5.92
Total votes		358,226	100.00
Nationalist People's Coalition hold			
Source: Commission on Elections

=== Vice Governor ===
Incumbent Vice Governor Eulogio de Guzman of the Nationalist People's Coalition ran for mayor of Bauang. Former vice governor Aureo Augusto Nisce of Lakas–Kampi–CMD who won the election.

Candidate	Party	Votes	%
Aureo Augusto Nisce	Lakas–Kampi–CMD	222,998	72.20
Justo Orros III	Independent	85,844	27.80
Total		308,842	100.00
Valid votes		308,842	86.21
Invalid/blank votes		49,384	13.79
Total votes		358,226	100.00
Lakas–Kampi–CMD gain from Nationalist People's Coalition			
Source: Commission on Elections

=== Provincial Board ===
The La Union Provincial Board is composed of 13 board members, 10 of whom are elected.

Party	Votes	%	Seats
Nationalist People's Coalition	674,459	57.42	7
Liberal Party	173,950	14.81	1
Lakas–Kampi–CMD	83,876	7.14	1
Nacionalista Party	29,691	2.53	0
Independent	212,553	18.10	1
Total	1,174,529	100.00	10
Total votes	358,226	–	
Source: Commission on Elections

==== 1st district ====
Candidate	Party	Votes	%
Francisco Ortega Jr.	Nationalist People's Coalition	118,774	23.98
Jose Maria Ortega	Nationalist People's Coalition	111,292	22.47
Joaquin Ostrea Jr.	Nationalist People's Coalition	93,167	18.81
Reynaldo Mosuela	Nationalist People's Coalition	88,237	17.81
Victoria Aragon	Lakas–Kampi–CMD	83,876	16.93
Total		495,346	100.00
Total votes		164,785	–
Source: Commission on Elections

==== 2nd district ====
Candidate	Party	Votes	%
Henry Balbin	Independent	98,200	14.46
Rolando Rivera	Nationalist People's Coalition	80,773	11.89
Robert Madarang Jr.	Nationalist People's Coalition	66,393	9.78
Henry Bacurnay Jr.	Liberal Party	62,987	9.27
Ruperto Rillera Jr.	Nationalist People's Coalition	58,614	8.63
Maria Annabelle de Guzman	Liberal Party	58,123	8.56
Avelino Lomboy	Nationalist People's Coalition	57,209	8.42
Pablo Olarte	Liberal Party	44,117	6.50
Robert Dulay	Independent	41,624	6.13
Nicky Oller	Nacionalista Party	29,691	4.37
Ramon Juloya	Independent	28,055	4.13
Ma. Concepcion Hidalgo	Independent	18,721	2.76
Nemesio Ramirez	Independent	9,256	1.36
Ronald John Estalilla	Liberal Party	8,723	1.28
Joselito Verceles	Independent	8,509	1.25
Richard Alaba	Independent	8,188	1.21
Total		679,183	100.00
Total votes		193,441	–
Source: Commission on Elections

== Pangasinan ==
=== Governor ===
Incumbent Governor Amado Espino Jr. of Lakas–Kampi–CMD won re-election to a second term.

Candidate	Party	Votes	%
Amado Espino Jr.	Lakas–Kampi–CMD	833,441	72.90
Victor Agbayani	Liberal Party	301,049	26.33
Wilfredo Sison	Independent	6,041	0.53
Wilfredo Velasco	Philippine Green Republican Party	2,672	0.23
Total		1,143,203	100.00
Valid votes		1,143,203	94.38
Invalid/blank votes		68,056	5.62
Total votes		1,211,259	100.00
Lakas–Kampi–CMD hold			
Source: Commission on Elections

=== Vice Governor ===
Incumbent Vice Governor Marlyn Primicias-Agabas of the Nationalist People's Coalition ran for the House of Representatives in Pangasinan's 6th district. Mapandan mayor Jose Calimlim Jr. of Lakas–Kampi–CMD won the election.

Candidate	Party	Votes	%
Jose Calimlim Jr.	Lakas–Kampi–CMD	622,728	60.34
Oscar Lambino	Liberal Party	386,598	37.46
Julius Magno	Pwersa ng Masang Pilipino	22,756	2.20
Total		1,032,082	100.00
Valid votes		1,032,082	85.21
Invalid/blank votes		179,177	14.79
Total votes		1,211,259	100.00
Lakas–Kampi–CMD gain from Nationalist People's Coalition			
Source: Commission on Elections

=== Provincial Board ===
The Pangasinan Provincial Board is composed of 15 board members, 12 of whom are elected.

Party	Votes	%	Seats
Nationalist People's Coalition	679,947	38.00	5
Liberal Party	543,125	30.35	4
Lakas–Kampi–CMD	538,562	30.10	3
Pwersa ng Masang Pilipino	3,719	0.21	0
Independent	24,162	1.35	0
Total	1,789,515	100.00	12
Total votes	1,211,259	–	
Source: Commission on Elections

==== 1st district ====
Candidate	Party	Votes	%
Napoleon Fontelera Jr.	Lakas–Kampi–CMD	84,149	32.06
Teofilo Humilde Jr.	Liberal Party	70,317	26.79
Artemio Amon	Lakas–Kampi–CMD	60,327	22.98
Benjamin Navarro II	Liberal Party	44,738	17.04
Dennis Mojares	Independent	2,957	1.13
Total		262,488	100.00
Total votes		184,622	–
Source: Commission on Elections

==== 2nd district ====
Candidate	Party	Votes	%
Von Mark Mendoza	Lakas–Kampi–CMD	114,135	35.93
Raul Sison	Lakas–Kampi–CMD	102,648	32.31
Jose Bengzon III	Liberal Party	71,375	22.47
Roberto Sison	Liberal Party	18,951	5.97
Edgar Pascua	Independent	6,818	2.15
Juan Gutierrez	Independent	3,772	1.19
Total		317,699	100.00
Total votes		212,582	–
Source: Commission on Elections

==== 3rd district ====
Candidate	Party	Votes	%
Generoso Tulagan Jr.	Liberal Party	122,785	30.77
Angel Baniqued	Nationalist People's Coalition	113,181	28.37
Wilson de Vera	Nationalist People's Coalition	60,088	15.06
Elpidio Fermin Jr.	Lakas–Kampi–CMD	57,229	14.34
Alex Medrano	Nationalist People's Coalition	38,276	9.59
Rosemero Muñoz	Independent	3,722	0.93
Eduardo Gonzales	Pwersa ng Masang Pilipino	3,719	0.93
Total		399,000	100.00
Total votes		264,461	–
Source: Commission on Elections

==== 4th district ====
Candidate	Party	Votes	%
Jeremy Agerico Rosario	Nationalist People's Coalition	68,904	36.18
Mojamito Libunao Jr.	Nationalist People's Coalition	62,089	32.60
Eleuterio Sison	Lakas–Kampi–CMD	35,166	18.47
Abraham de Asis	Lakas–Kampi–CMD	17,394	9.13
Leonardo Biason	Independent	6,893	3.62
Total		190,446	100.00
Total votes		126,863	–
Source: Commission on Elections

==== 5th district ====
Candidate	Party	Votes	%
Danilo Uy	Nationalist People's Coalition	111,212	36.54
Clemente Arboleda Jr.	Liberal Party	107,891	35.45
Dionisio Villar Jr.	Nationalist People's Coalition	74,038	24.32
Bonifacio Gandia	Liberal Party	11,240	3.69
Total		304,381	100.00
Total votes		218,108	–
Source: Commission on Elections

==== 6th district ====
Candidate	Party	Votes	%
Ranjit Shahani	Liberal Party	78,051	24.74
Alfonso Bince Jr.	Nationalist People's Coalition	77,265	24.49
Susan Casareno	Nationalist People's Coalition	74,894	23.74
Jose Peralta Jr.	Lakas–Kampi–CMD	40,750	12.92
Rodolfo Custodio	Lakas–Kampi–CMD	26,764	8.48
Karlos Guerrero Zaragoza	Liberal Party	17,777	5.63
Total		315,501	100.00
Total votes		204,623	–
Source: Commission on Elections
