= 2010 Tarlac City local elections =

2010 Tarlac City mayoral election
- May 10, 2010
Candidate	Gelacio Manalang	Sherwin Rigor	Marco Mendoza
Party	Lakas–Kampi	Sama-Sama Tarlac	Liberal
Running mate	Jojo Briones	Alejandro Fernandez	Mike Tañedo
Popular vote	49,223	45,979	20,343
Percentage	39.55	36.95	16.35
Mayor before election
Genaro Mendoza
Liberal
Elected mayor
Gelacio Manalang
Lakas–Kampi
- 2010 Tarlac City vice mayoral election
- May 10, 2010
Candidate	Mike Tañedo	Alejandro Fernandez	Jojo Briones
Party	Liberal	NPC	Lakas–Kampi
Popular vote	55,239	34,904	28,395
Percentage	46.60	29.45	23.95
Vice Mayor before election
Mike Tañedo
Liberal
Elected Vice Mayor
Mike Tañedo
Liberal

Tarlac City held local elections on May 10, 2010, within the Philippine general election. The voters elected candidates for mayor, vice mayor, and ten councilors. The incumbent mayor of Tarlac, Genaro Mendoza, was term-limited and thus unable to seek re-election to another term in office. He unsuccessfully sought election for the 2nd district congressional seat in Tarlac.

Former three-term Mayor Gelacio Manalang, who served from 1992 to 2001, successfully staged a comeback for the mayoralty post after having been defeated by Mendoza during the previous two elections. Manalang narrowly defeated former councilor Sherwin Rigor, as well as Marco Mendoza, brother of incumbent Mayor Mendoza, and incumbent 2nd district provincial board member Amado Go.

In the vice mayoral race, incumbent Vice Mayor Mike Tañedo won reelection to a second term over pediatrician Alejandro Fernandez and incumbent Councilor and former Vice Mayor Jojo Briones.

Mendoza's Team Magsikap coalition won seven out of ten seats in the city council, with Rigor's Team Malasakit coalition getting the remaining three seats.

== Candidates ==
Parties are as stated in their certificate of candidacies.

=== Team Magsikap ===
Team Magsikap (Liberal Party)
Name	Party
For mayor
Marco Mendoza	Liberal
For vice mayor
Mike Tañedo	Liberal
For councilor
Ana Aguas	Liberal
Pepito Basangan	Liberal
Glenn Troy Caritativo	Liberal
Joji David	Independent
Richard Diolazo	Liberal
Erlinda Dueñas	Liberal
Arsenio Lugay II	Independent
Andrew Mendoza	Liberal
Vlad Rodriguez	Liberal
Noel Soliman	Liberal

=== Team Malasakit ===
Team Malasakit (Sama-Sama Tarlac)
Name	Party
For mayor
Sherwin Rigor	SST
For vice mayor
Alejandro Fernandez	NPC
For councilor
Amado de Leon	NPC
Roy Escalona	NPC
Ernesto Galang	NPC
Cesar Go	NPC
Emily Ladera-Facunla	NPC
Emilio Magbag Jr.	NPC
Romeo Mallari	NPC
Noel Manalili	NPC
Weng Quiroz	NPC
Arturo Serrano	NPC

=== Team Balik Sigla ===
Team Balik Sigla (Lakas)
Name	Party
For mayor
Gelacio Manalang	Lakas–Kampi
For vice mayor
Jojo Briones	Lakas–Kampi
For councilor
Odessa Bautista	Lakas–Kampi
Filoteo Gozum	Lakas–Kampi
Rosalie Mallari	Lakas–Kampi
Freddy Quiroz	Lakas–Kampi
Cesar Rivera	Lakas–Kampi
Guillermina Tabamo	Lakas–Kampi
Willie Tiamzon	Lakas–Kampi
Paul Villafaña	Lakas–Kampi

=== Others ===
Philippine Green Republican Party
Name	Party
For mayor
Samuel Capiral	PGRP
For councilor
Macario Bustos	PGRP

Nationalist People's Coalition
Name	Party
For mayor
Amado Go	NPC

Independents not in tickets
Name	Party
For mayor
Roger Tomaroy	Independent
For councilor
Galicano Datu Jr.	Independent
Nestor David	Independent
Marcus de Jesus	Independent
Manuel Dimatulac Sr.	Independent
Ismael Quintos	Independent

== Mayoral and vice mayoral elections ==
The candidates for mayor and vice mayor with the highest number of votes wins the seat; they are voted separately, therefore, they may be of different parties when elected.

=== Mayor ===
Tarlac City mayoral election
Party	Candidate	Votes	%
Lakas–Kampi	Gelacio Manalang	49,223	39.55
SST	Sherwin Rigor	45,979	36.95
Liberal	Marco Mendoza	20,343	16.35
NPC	Amado Go	8,095	6.50
PGRP	Samuel Capiral	637	0.51
Independent	Roger Tomaroy	167	0.13
Margin of victory		3,244	2.61
Valid ballots		124,444	96.23
Invalid or blank votes		4,881	3.77
Total votes		129,325	100.00
Lakas–Kampi gain from Liberal			

=== Vice Mayor ===
Tarlac City vice mayoral election
Party	Candidate	Votes	%
Liberal	Mike Tañedo	55,239	46.60
NPC	Alejandro Fernandez	34,904	29.45
Lakas–Kampi	Jojo Briones	28,395	23.95
Margin of victory		20,335	17.15
Valid ballots		118,538	91.66
Invalid or blank votes		10,787	8.34
Total votes		129,325	100.00
Liberal hold			

== City Council elections ==
Tarlac City elected Sangguniang Panlungsod or city council members. A voter votes for up to ten candidates, then the ten candidates with the highest number of votes are elected. Election is via plurality-at-large voting.

=== Results per candidate ===
Summary of the May 10, 2010 Tarlac City council election results
Rank	Candidate	Coalition	Party	Votes	%
1.	Noel Soliman	Team Magsikap	Liberal	61,998	47.94%
2.	Arsenio Lugay II	Team Magsikap	Independent	53,490	41.36%
3.	Ana Aguas	Team Magsikap	Liberal	52,618	40.69%
4.	Emily Ladera-Facunla	Team Malasakit	NPC	50,449	39.01%
5.	Glenn Troy Caritativo	Team Magsikap	Liberal	49,169	38.02%
6.	Amado de Leon	Team Malasakit	NPC	47,468	36.70%
7.	Richard Diolazo	Team Magsikap	Liberal	47,271	36.55%
8.	Joji David	Team Magsikap	Independent	44,849	34.68%
9.	Vlad Rodriguez	Team Magsikap	Liberal	40,478	31.30%
10.	Weng Quiroz	Team Malasakit	NPC	33,994	26.29%
11.	Emilio Magbag Jr.	Team Malasakit	NPC	32,565	25.18%
12.	Pepito Basangan	Team Magsikap	Liberal	31,319	24.22%
13.	Guillermina Tabamo	Team Balik Sigla	Lakas–Kampi	31,017	23.98%
14.	Andrew Mendoza	Team Magsikap	Liberal	30,344	23.46%
15.	Filoteo Gozum	Team Balik Sigla	Lakas–Kampi	28,695	22.19%
16.	Cesar Go	Team Malasakit	NPC	26,490	20.48%
17.	Romeo Mallari	Team Malasakit	NPC	23,294	18.01%
18.	Arturo Serrano	Team Malasakit	NPC	23,257	17.98%
19.	Ismael Quintos	Not affiliated	Independent	22,617	17.49%
20.	Roy Escalona	Team Malasakit	NPC	21,428	16.57%
21.	Ernesto Galang	Team Malasakit	NPC	20,288	15.69%
22.	Erlinda Dueñas	Team Magsikap	Liberal	19,735	15.26%
23.	Freddy Quiroz	Team Balik Sigla	Lakas–Kampi	19,711	15.24%
24.	Odessa Bautista	Team Balik Sigla	Lakas–Kampi	19,628	15.18%
25.	Rosalie Mallari	Team Balik Sigla	Lakas–Kampi	16,982	13.13%
26.	Noel Manalili	Team Malasakit	NPC	14,436	11.16%
27.	Nestor David	Not affiliated	Independent	12,744	9.85%
28.	Paul Villafaña	Team Balik Sigla	Lakas–Kampi	10,379	8.03%
29.	Willie Tiamzon	Team Balik Sigla	Lakas–Kampi	7,584	5.86%
30.	Cesar Rivera	Team Balik Sigla	Lakas–Kampi	6,135	4.74%
31.	Manuel Dimatulac Sr.	Not affiliated	Independent	5,159	3.99%
32.	Marcus de Jesus	Not affiliated	Independent	4,795	3.71%
33.	Macario Bustos	Not affiliated	PGRP	3,669	2.84%
34.	Galicano Datu Jr.	Not affiliated	Independent	2,128	1.65%
Total turnout				129,325	
Note: A total of 34 candidates ran for councilor.			Source: COMELEC transparency server		

=== Results per coalition ===
Coalition	Total votes	%	Seats won	%
Team Magsikap (Mendoza)	431,271	47.07%	7	70%
Team Malasakit (Rigor)	293,669	32.05%	3	30%
Team Balik Sigla (Manalang)	140,131	15.30%	0	0%
Independents not in coalitions	47,443	5.18%	0	0%
Philippine Green Republican Party (Capiral)	3,669	0.40%	0	0%
Totals	916,183	100%	10	100%

=== Results per party ===
Party	Mayoral candidate	Total votes		Total seats	
Party	Mayoral candidate	Total	%	Total	%
Liberal	Marco Mendoza	332,932	36.34%	5	41.5%
NPC	Sherwin Rigor	293,669	32.05%	3	24.9%
Independent	various	145,782	15.91%	2	16.6%
Lakas–Kampi	Gelacio Manalang	140,131	15.30%	0	0.0%
PGRP	Samuel Capiral	3,669	0.40%	0	0.0%
Total valid votes cast		916,183	N/A		
Total turnout		129,325			
Total partisan seats				10	83.3%
Seat for Association of Barangay Captains President				1	8.3%
Seat for Association of Sangguniang Kabataan chairmen President				1	8.3%
Total non-partisan seats				2	16.3%
Total seats				12	100.0%

Notes:

- Amado Go ran as mayor under the NPC. However, all NPC city council candidates are under Rigor's Sama-Sama Tarlac / Team Malasakit slate.
