= 2010 Philippine general election =

- Registered: 51,317,073
- Turnout: 38,149,371
- 2010 Philippine presidential election
- May 10, 2010

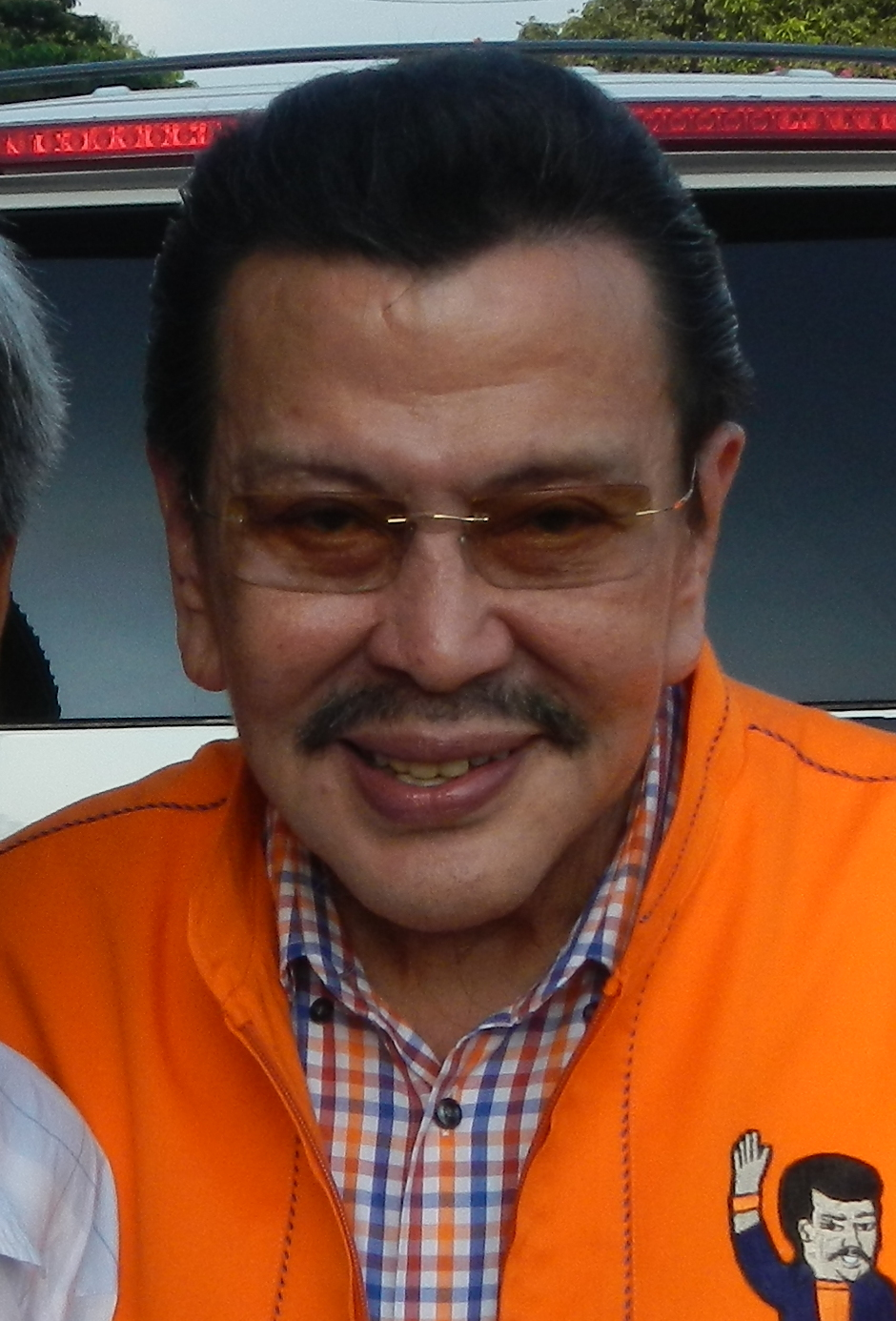

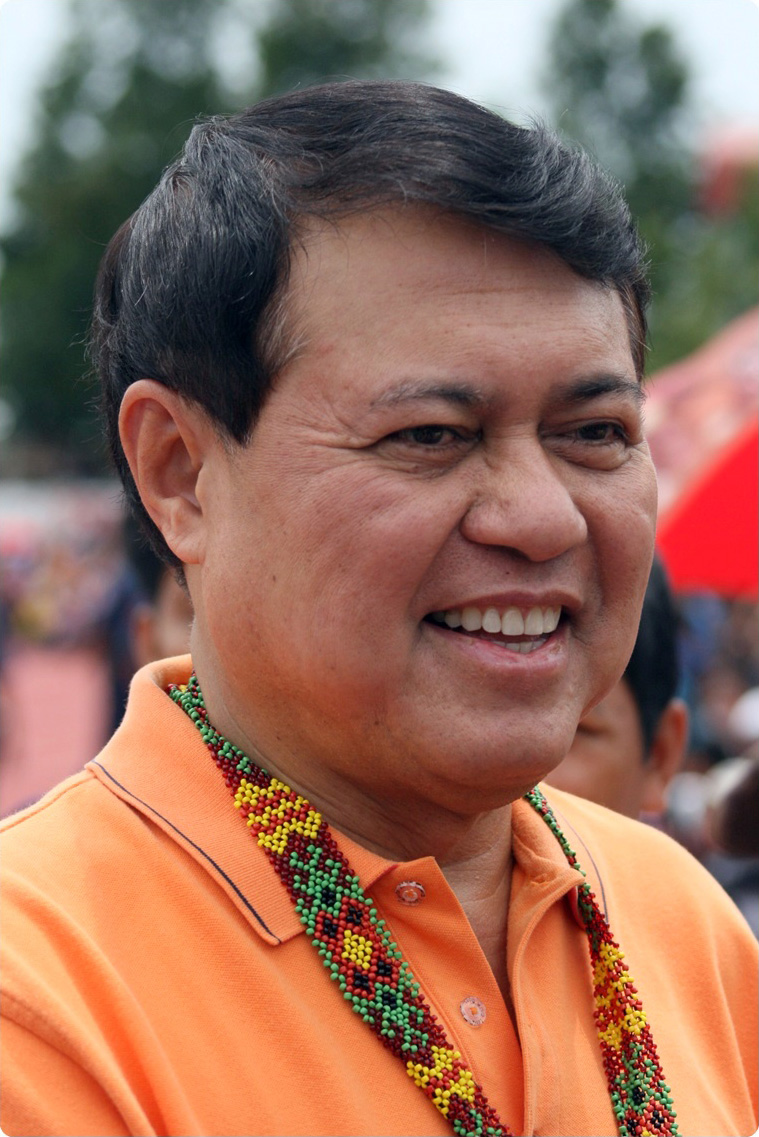
Nominee	Benigno Aquino III	Joseph Estrada	Manuel Villar
Party	Liberal	PMP	Nacionalista
Running mate	Mar Roxas	Jejomar Binay	Loren Legarda
Popular vote	15,208,678	9,487,837	5,573,835
Percentage	42.08%	26.25%	15.42%
President before election
Gloria Macapagal Arroyo
Lakas–Kampi
Elected President
Benigno Aquino III
Liberal
- 2010 Philippine vice presidential election
- May 10, 2010
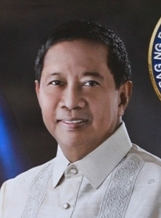

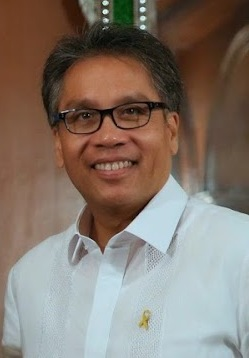

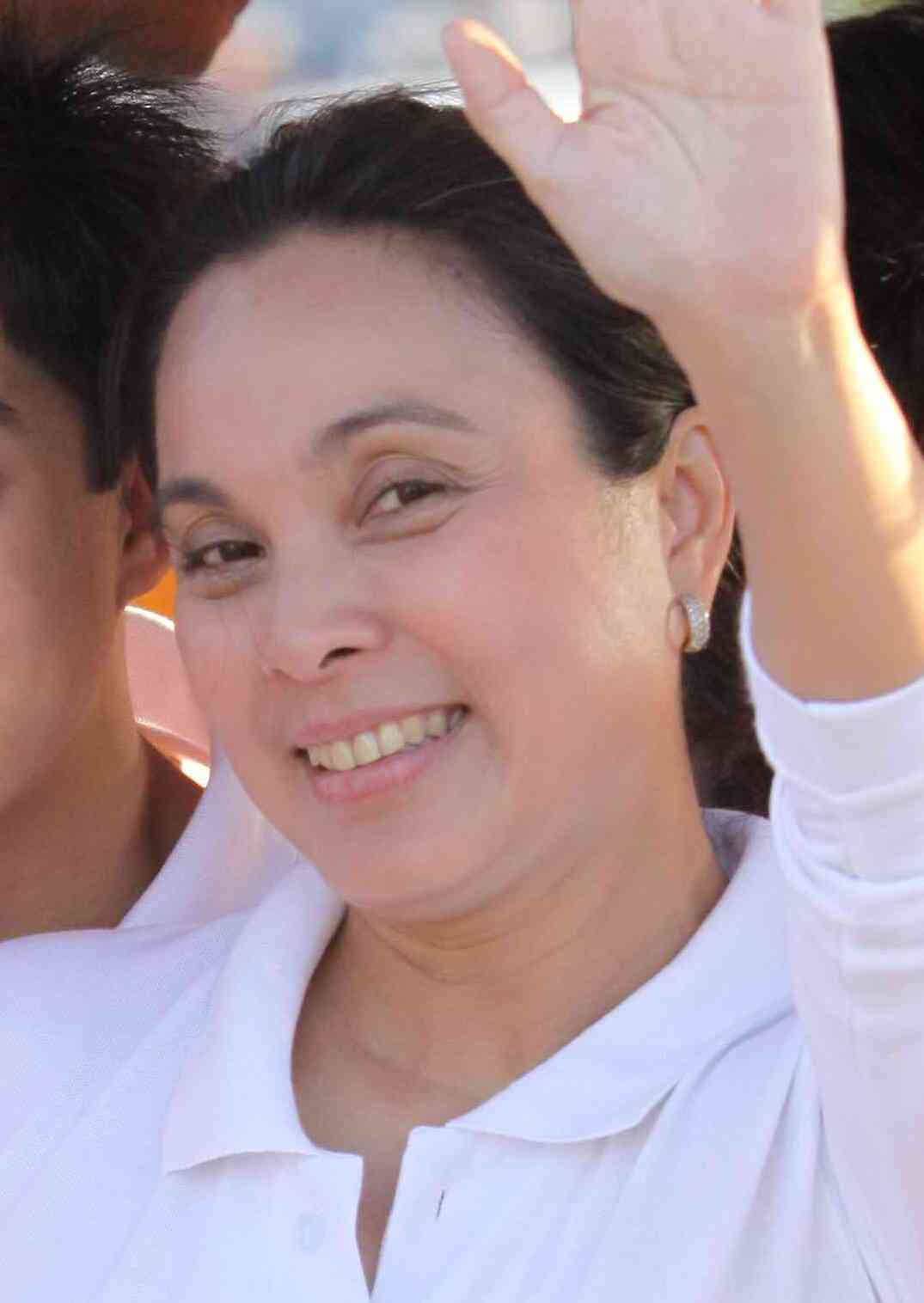
Candidate	Jejomar Binay	Mar Roxas	Loren Legarda
Party	PDP–Laban	Liberal	NPC
Popular vote	14,645,574	13,918,490	4,294,664
Percentage	41.65%	39.58%	12.21%
Vice President before election
Noli de Castro
Independent
Elected Vice President
Jejomar Binay
UNA
- 2010 Philippine Senate election
- May 10, 2010

12 (of the 24) seats to the Senate 13 seats needed for a majority
	First party	Second party	Third party
Party	Liberal	Nacionalista	PMP
Seats won	4	3	2
Popular vote	97,187,269	80,719,737	51,960,970
Percentage	32.72%	27.18%	17.49%
Senate President before election
Juan Ponce Enrile
PMP
Elected Senate President
Juan Ponce Enrile
PMP
- 2010 Philippine House of Representatives elections
- May 10, 2010
- All 286 seats to the House of Representatives of the Philippines; 144 seats needed for a majority
Party	Vote %	Seats	+/–
Lakas–Kampi	37.41	106	+106
Liberal	19.93	47	+24
NPC	15.97	29	+1
Nacionalista	11.35	25	+14
Others	12.78	22	0
Party-list	—	57	+4
This lists parties that won seats. See the complete results below.
Speaker before	Speaker after
Prospero Nograles; Lakas–Kampi	Feliciano Belmonte Jr. Liberal

Elections for all positions in the Philippines above the barangay (except for Autonomous Region in Muslim Mindanao regional level) were held on May 10, 2010. The elected president is Benigno Aquino III, the 15th President of the Philippines, succeeding President Gloria Macapagal Arroyo who was barred from seeking re-election due to term restrictions. The successor of Vice-President Noli de Castro is Jejomar Binay, the 13th Vice President of the Philippines. The legislators elected in the 2010 elections joined the senators of the 2007 elections and comprised the 15th Congress of the Philippines.

The 2010 elections were administered by the Commission on Elections (COMELEC) in compliance with the Republic Act No. 9369, also known as the Amended Computerization Act of 2007. It was the first in national level, and second overall computerized election after the August 11, 2008 Autonomous Region in Muslim Mindanao regional election in the history of the Philippines. Although there were cases of precinct count optical scan (PCOS) machine failures, there was no postponement of elections since most technical issues were resolved by election day. Despite the fact that some provinces have reported failure of elections, these have not surpassed the 0.50% of the total number of PCOS machines, and most were replaced on time.

Local elections were held in all provinces, cities and municipalities for provincial governors, vice governors and board members, and city/municipal mayors, vice mayors and councilors.

There were more than 85,000 candidates for 17,000 national and local positions and it is believed that the youth had the swing vote in this election as 40% of voters are 18–35 and there are a potential 3 million first-time voters.

== Background ==
The current Philippine constitution allows a president to serve for only one six-year term; however, former president Gloria Macapagal Arroyo served for 9 years, 5 months, and 10 days (3,448 days) and 2 presidential terms because she took over the last three years of Joseph Estrada's administration when Estrada was ousted as the result of the Second EDSA Revolution. On May 10, 2004 Arroyo won the election and finished her full second 6-year term on June 30, 2010.

== General issues ==
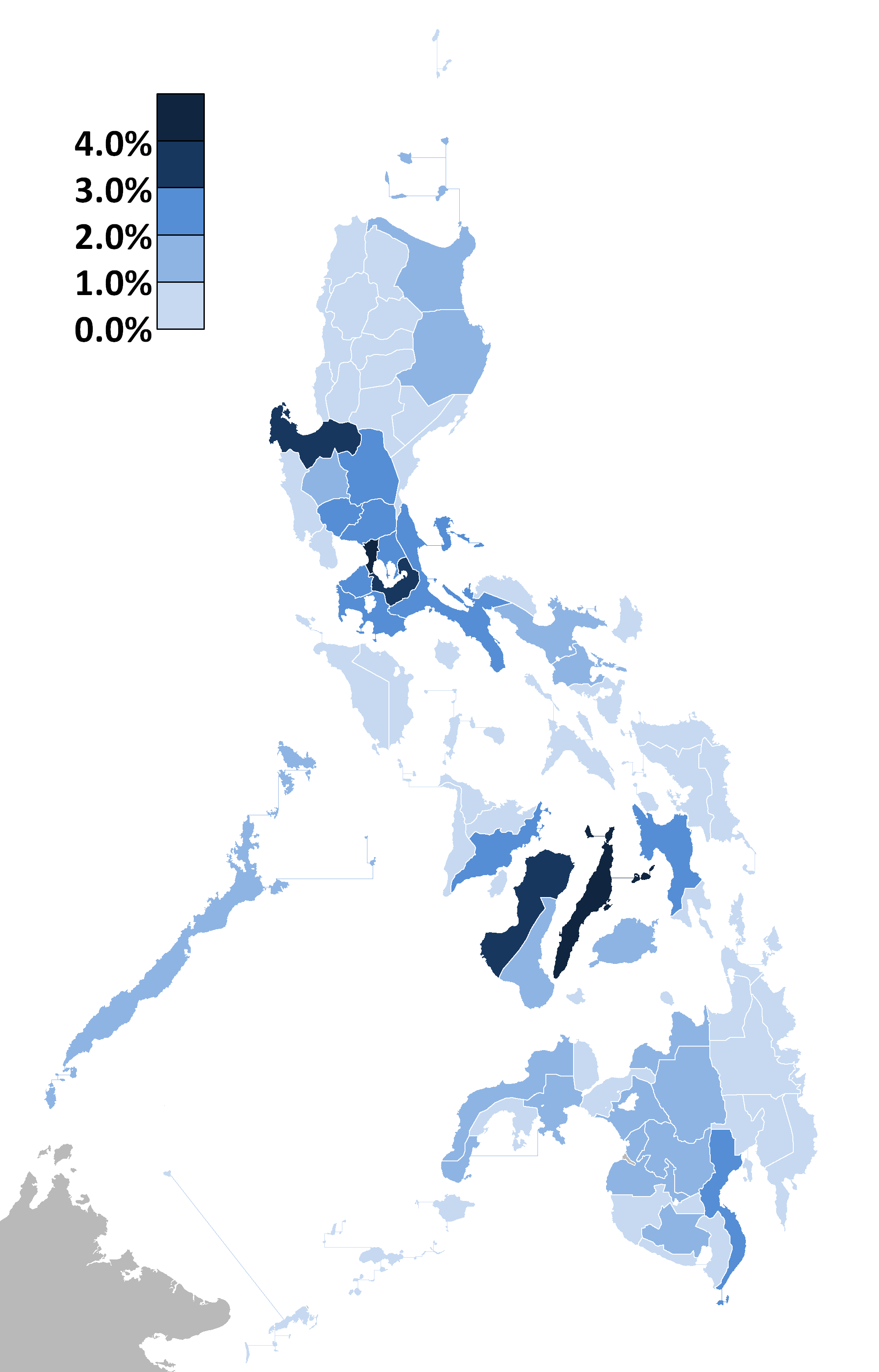
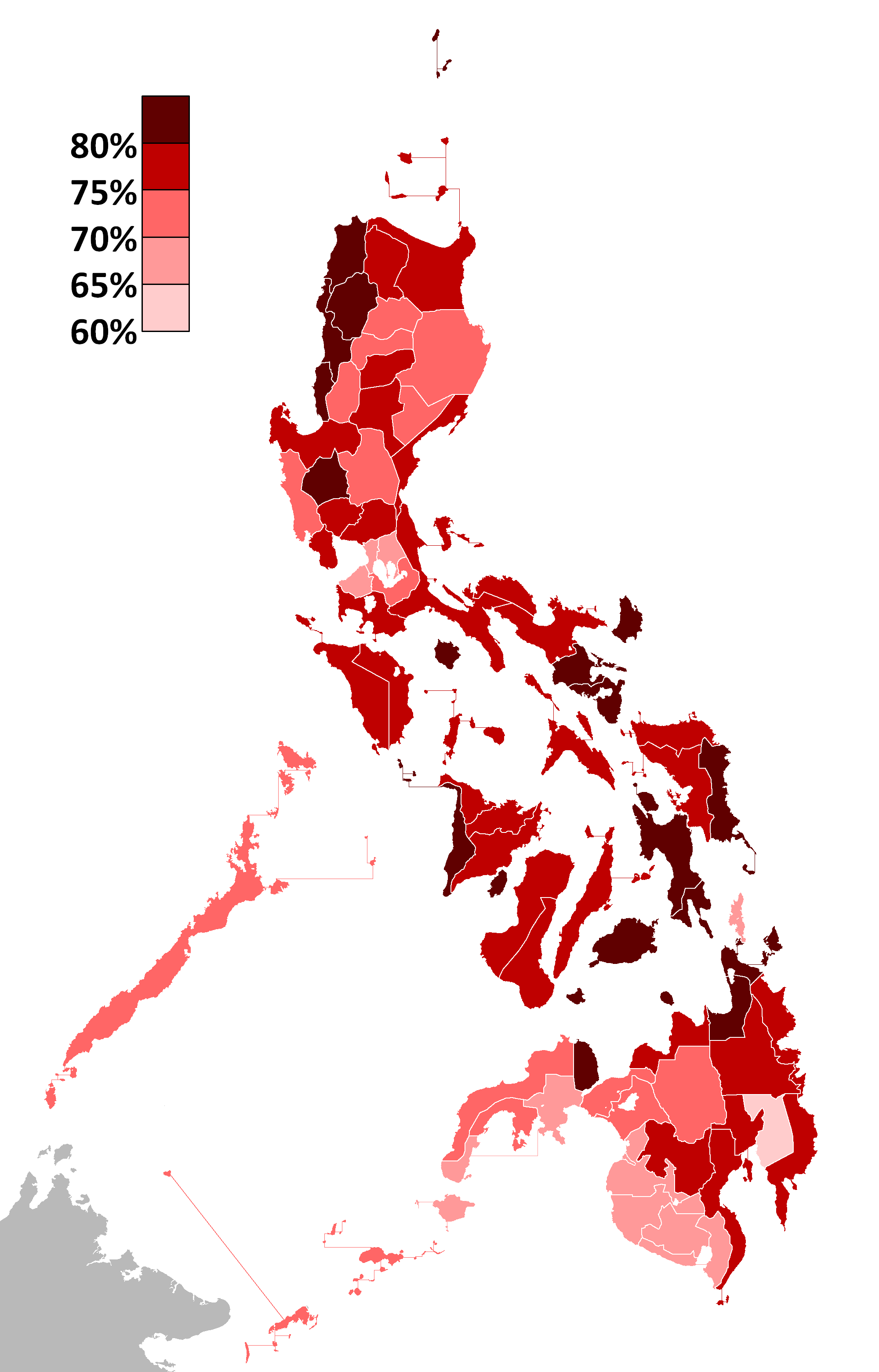
Number of registered voters as compared to the national total per province (left), and voter turnout per province (right).

In a decision dated December 2, 2009, the Supreme Court ruled that appointive officials seeking positions in the elections do not need to resign from their posts, striking down Section 4(a) of COMELEC Resolution 8678, Section 13 of Republic Act 9369, and Section 66 of the Omnibus Election Code as unconstitutional, "for violating the equal protection clause and being too broad."

=== Party-switching ===
As election day approached, several politicians switched political parties in order to gain votes and funding for the campaign. Many switches were controversial, with the ruling party Lakas Kampi CMD having the most defections, most of which went either to the Liberal Party or to the Nacionalista Party.

The politicians who switched parties after the start of the local campaign period are:

Date	Politician	Running for	Old party	New party
March 24	Jose Maria Zubiri Jr.	Vice Governor of Bukidnon	Lakas–Kampi	Nacionalista
March 29	Nerissa Soon-Ruiz	Mayor of Mandaue	Lakas–Kampi	Nacionalista
April 11	Arturo Uy	Governor of Compostela Valley	Lakas–Kampi	Nacionalista
April 12	Neptali Gonzales II	Congressman of Mandaluyong	Lakas–Kampi	Liberal
April 12	Roilo Golez	Congressman of Parañaque's 2nd district	Independent	Liberal
April 14	Joey Salceda	Governor of Albay	Lakas–Kampi	Liberal
April 15	Benasing Macarambon	Congressman of Lanao del Sur's 2nd district	Lakas–Kampi	Nacionalista
April 20	Mary Ann Susano	Mayor of Quezon City	Lakas–Kampi	PMP

Furthermore, Luis "Chavit" Singson resigned from Lakas and endorsed a candidate aside from Gilberto Teodoro, but did not join another party. Singson endorsed Villar, then resigned from Lakas, but has not joined Villar's Nacionalista Party.

== Controversies ==
Five days before the elections, petitions were made to postpone the elections due to technical malfunctions with the electronic voting machines. On May 7, 2010, the Supreme Court rejected the petitions, affirming the vote would go ahead as planned.

Several cities and provinces encountered several problems, postponing the election. In Caloocan, voting was delayed as the box of ballots delivered to clustered precinct 599 in the city's Pajo district contained ballots for a clustered precinct in Sampaloc, Manila.

=== Election-related violence ===
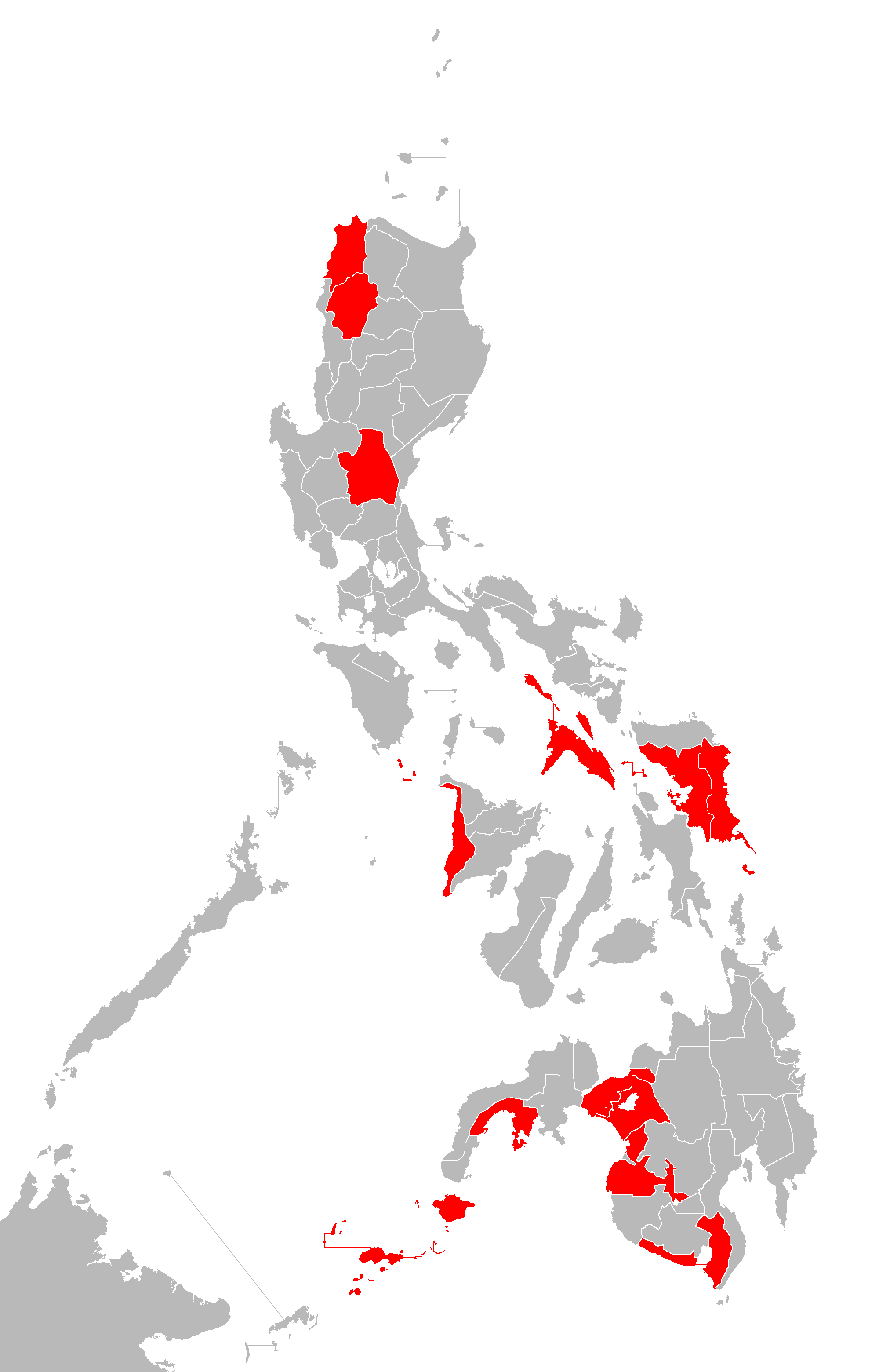
Election hotspots in the Philippines.

Prior to the end of the filing of certificates of candidacy, the COMELEC had anticipated several areas to be named as "election hotspots".

On November 23, 2009, the entourage of the wife of Buluan, Maguindanao vice-mayor Esmael Mangudadatu who ran for provincial governor, including journalists, were abducted and killed in the province's town of Ampatuan. Before she was killed, Mangudadatu's wife blamed provincial governor Andal Ampatuan Jr. as the culprit. Ampatuan Jr. was later arrested. After several arms and military vehicles were seized in Ampatuans' properties and government installations, President Arroyo declared martial law in parts of the province not controlled by the Moro Islamic Liberation Front on December 4.

On December 28, 2009, a candidate for councilor died, and two incumbent officials were wounded in an ambush in Dingras, Ilocos Norte. The gunmen fired at the convoy including barangay chairwoman Joen Caniete, who was running for councilor under the Nacionalista Party; the wounded included a sitting councilor and a provincial board member.

In Sorsogon, Julio Esquivias, a Nacionalista candidate for councilor in the town of Casiguran, died due to a gunshot wound after he was shot by an unidentified gunman.

In a command conference by the Armed Forces of the Philippines, Philippine National Police and the COMELEC, 14 election "hotspots" were identified. They were Abra, Ilocos Norte, Masbate and Nueva Ecija in Luzon, Samar (Western Samar), Eastern Samar and Antique in the Visayas, and Basilan, Sulu, Maguindanao, Lanao del Norte, Lanao del Sur, Sarangani, and Zamboanga Sibugay in Mindanao.

Worsening private armed violence was a serious security concern which had the capacity to undermine the 2010 elections. Even though a commission was already formed to dismantle private armies, skeptics were unconvinced that the government could have succeeded in this task as it had a poor track record of dealing with the ongoing problem of internal violence.

Before election day, a bomb exploded at 1:20 a.m. in Ampatuan, Maguindanao. No casualties were reported. In Conception, Iloilo, armed men fired at the Liberal Party headquarters. No casualties were reported.

During election day, three bombs exploded at a polling precinct at Pakpak Elementary School in Marawi City, Lanao del Sur. No casualties or injuries were reported. Another bomb exploded in Zamboanga Sibugay, killing three people. Two bombs exploded at Mindanao State University where several polling precinct were clustered. An NK2 grenade exploded at Shariff Aguak, Maguindanao. No casualties reported. On the same day, at 12:00nn (PST), a shooting incident happened in the same area between the rival candidates. Two innocent persons were killed.

As of 1:30pm (PST) fourteen casualties were reported due to election-related violence. at 2:25pm (PST), a shooting incident in a barangay in Maguindanao caused the local cancellation of the elections.

=== Constitutionality of the elections ===
Many concerned civil society groups including the Center for People Empowerment in Governance (CenPEG), Philippine Computer Society (PCS), and Global Filipino Nation (GFN) protested the illegality and unconstitutionality of how the elections were conducted, particularly with implementing safety measures against fraud and cheating.

In an interim report by GFN 2010 Election Observers Team released on May 27 titled "Foreign Observers Challenge Election Legitimacy", they presented arguments questioning the May 10, 2010 elections summarized below:

1. The election results transmitted from the precincts do not have digital signatures of the Board of Election Inspectors (BEI)
2. The number of disenfranchised voters is sufficient to greatly affect the results of the elections.
3. The Automated Election System (AES) was implemented without the appropriate field testing, and law-specified testing in actual elections.
4. The source code review was not completed and initial findings were not addressed.
5. No audit was done on the AES prior to the elections. There was only a mandated random manual audit which was not yet done at the time the report was written (May 27, 2010).
6. Several voter and security features were disabled prior to elections.

Many different groups also echoed the same sentiments like Kaakbay Partylist in its critique of the May 10, 2010 polls. They also questioned the removal of digital signatures

==== Removal of digital signatures ====
While Republic Act 9369 states that "The election returns transmitted electronically and digitally signed shall be considered as official election results and shall be used as the basis for the canvassing of votes and the proclamation of a candidate.", the Commission on Elections (COMELEC) issued Resolution 8786 on March 4, 2010, which became the basis for the decision to remove digital signatures which the COMELEC ruled as no longer necessary. Three Board of Election Inspectors (BEIs) were originally required to put in their iButton Key for the results to be digitally signed before transmission and make it official. But because of the issuance of COMELEC Resolution 8786, BEIs were directed to press "No" when asked by the PCOS machines to digitally sign the files for transmission.

In the joint committee meeting at Batasang Pambansa, Senator Enrile asked the COMELEC officials why they removed the use of the digital signatures. Cesar Flores, Smartmatic Asia Pacific president, said “The voting machine has a digital signature in itself which is also corroborated in the card and the password that is provided to the BEIs. The BEIs when they sign the password, they encrypt the result, and the result is digitally signed.” (Sic)

Kaakbay Partylist released its critique of the election on June 6, 2010. The group cited complaints regarding the removal of main security features and verifiability of votes and also answered the arguments of those given by the COMELEC officials:

"On March 4, 2010, Comelec issued Resolution 8786 dated March 4, 2010, essentially disabling the use of digital signatures. Thus, the electronically transmitted votes from the precincts no longer bear digital signatures. Several excuses were given by Comelec ranging from PCOS machine signatures being equivalent to digital signature (which of course is not true); use of digital signature will require another P1 billion (as if digital feature is not included in the P7.1-billion contract); reducing transmission time (how less than one minute signing digitally will reduce much a transmission of about 30 to 60 minutes?); and the PCOS i-button and BEI Personal Identification Numbers (PINs) are equivalents (of course, not)".

== Candidates ==
=== Ang Kapatiran ===
Ang Kapatiran ticket
#	Name	Party
For President
3.	John Carlos de los Reyes	Ang Kapatiran
For Vice President
2.	Dominador Chipeco Jr.	Ang Kapatiran
For Senators
11.	Rizalito David	Ang Kapatiran
21.	Jo Imbong	Ang Kapatiran
50.	Grace Riñoza-Plazo	Ang Kapatiran
52.	Adrian Sison	Ang Kapatiran
55.	Reginald Tamayo	Ang Kapatiran
56.	Hector Tarrazona	Ang Kapatiran
59.	Manny Valdahuesa	Ang Kapatiran

=== Bagumbayan–VNP ===
Bagumbayan–VNP ticket
#	Name	Party
For President
5.	Dick Gordon	Bagumbayan
For Vice President
3.	Bayani Fernando	Bagumbayan

=== Bangon Pilipinas ===
Bangon Pilipinas ticket
#	Name	Party
For President
9.	Eddie Villanueva	Bangon Pilipinas
For Vice President
8.	Perfecto Yasay	Bangon Pilipinas
For Senators
3.	Zafrullah Alonto	Bangon Pilipinas
22.	Kata Inocencio	Bangon Pilipinas
35.	Adz Nikabulin	Bangon Pilipinas
36.	Ramoncito Ocampo	Bangon Pilipinas
42.	Imelda Papin	Bangon Pilipinas
43.	Zosimo Paredes	Bangon Pilipinas
46.	Reynaldo Princesa	Independent
58.	Alex Tinsay	Bangon Pilipinas
61.	Israel Virgines	Bangon Pilipinas

=== Kilusang Bagong Lipunan ===
Kilusang Bagong Lipunan ticket
#	Name	Party
For Vice President
7.	Jay Sonza	KBL
For Senators
2.	Shariff Ibraim Albani	KBL
16.	Nanette Espinosa	KBL
29.	Alma Lood	KBL
31.	Regalado Maambong	KBL
60.	Hector Villanueva	KBL

=== Lakas Kampi CMD ===
Lakas Kampi CMD ticket
#	Name	Party
For President
8.	Gibo Teodoro	Lakas–Kampi
For Vice President
5.	Edu Manzano	Lakas–Kampi
For Senators
6.	Silvestre Bello III	Lakas–Kampi
8.	Bong Revilla	Lakas–Kampi
18.	Ramon Guico Jr.	Lakas–Kampi
24.	Raul Lambino	Lakas–Kampi
25.	Rey Langit	Lakas–Kampi
27.	Lito Lapid	Lakas–Kampi

=== Liberal Party ===
Liberal Party ticket
#	Name	Party
For President
2.	Benigno Aquino III	Liberal
For Vice President
7.	Mar Roxas	Liberal
For Senators
1.	Neric Acosta	Liberal
5.	Martin Bautista	Liberal
7.	Ruffy Biazon	Liberal
14.	Franklin Drilon	Liberal
19.	TG Guingona	Liberal
20.	Risa Hontiveros	Liberal
23.	Alex Lacson	Liberal
26.	Yasmin Lao	Liberal
28.	Danilo Lim	Independent
40.	Serge Osmeña	Independent
48.	Ralph Recto	Liberal
51.	Sonia Roco	Liberal

=== Nacionalista Party/NPC ===
Nacionalista Party/Nationalist People's Coalition ticket
#	Name	Party
For President
10.	Manny Villar	Nacionalista
For Vice President
5.	Loren Legarda	NPC
For Senators
8.	Bong Revilla*	Lakas–Kampi
10.	Pia Cayetano	Nacionalista
13.	Miriam Defensor Santiago	PRP
32.	Bongbong Marcos	Nacionalista
33.	Liza Maza	Independent
34.	Ramon Mitra III	Nacionalista
37.	Satur Ocampo	Bayan Muna
38.	Susan Ople	Nacionalista
44.	Gwen Pimentel	PDP–Laban
47.	Ariel Querubin	Nacionalista
49.	Gilbert Remulla	Nacionalista
54.	Adel Tamano	Nacionalista

*Guest candidate

=== PMP/PDP–Laban ===
Pwersa ng Masang Pilipino ticket
#	Name	Party
For President
4.	Joseph Estrada	PMP
For Vice President
1.	Jejomar Binay	PDP–Laban
For Senators
4.	JV Bautista	PMP
12.	Joey de Venecia	PMP
15.	Juan Ponce Enrile	PMP
17.	Jinggoy Estrada	PMP
30.	Jun Lozada	PMP
31.	Regalado Maambong	KBL
45.	Rodolfo Plaza	NPC
57.	Francisco Tatad	GAD
8.	Bong Revilla*	Lakas–Kampi
13.	Miriam Defensor Santiago*	PRP
28.	Danny Lim*	Independent
40.	Serge Osmeña*	Independent

*Guest candidates

=== Others ===
#	Name	Party
For President
6.	Jamby Madrigal	Independent
7.	Nicanor Perlas	Independent
For Senators
9.	Henry Caunan	PDP–Laban
39.	Lito Osmeña	PROMDI
41.	Jovito Palparan	Independent
53.	Tito Sotto	NPC

== Results ==
Reports indicated that the election day was marred with controversies, particularly in the insurgent-ridden provinces in Mindanao, though other provinces also faced difficulties such as computer glitches on the voting machines, disorderly conduct, vote buying, and violence. In Cebu City, spikes placed by unidentified men on the road caused a delay in the delivery of ballot boxes throughout the province of Cebu early Monday.

A total of over 76,340 precinct count optical scanner (PCOS) machines, about 5,000 back-up units, and about 1,700 servers were deployed in the country's first nationwide fully automated elections—from counting of votes to transmission and canvassing of election results. Election Day had live full coverage from GMA Network and ABS-CBN. Besides logistical problems, during the last few days prior to the election poll machine and services supplier Smartmatic-Total Information Management (TIM) found cases of PCOS machine failures. Nonetheless, it was decided not to postpone elections since the technical issues were resolved quickly and the solution could be deployed by the day of election. Despite the fact that some provinces reported issues in the election process, these did not surpass the 0.50% of the total number of PCOS machines, and most were replaced on time, as planned for. As a result of the delays, the COMELEC extended voting hours from 6:00 p.m. to 7:00 p.m. and continued through the night transmitting the votes from every precinct scattered across the country.

After the elections closed and transmissions from PCOS machines began arriving en masse and the COMELEC was able to publish the first partial results, many former doubts and concerns vanished, replaced by astonishment due to the unprecedented speed of the tally.

=== President ===
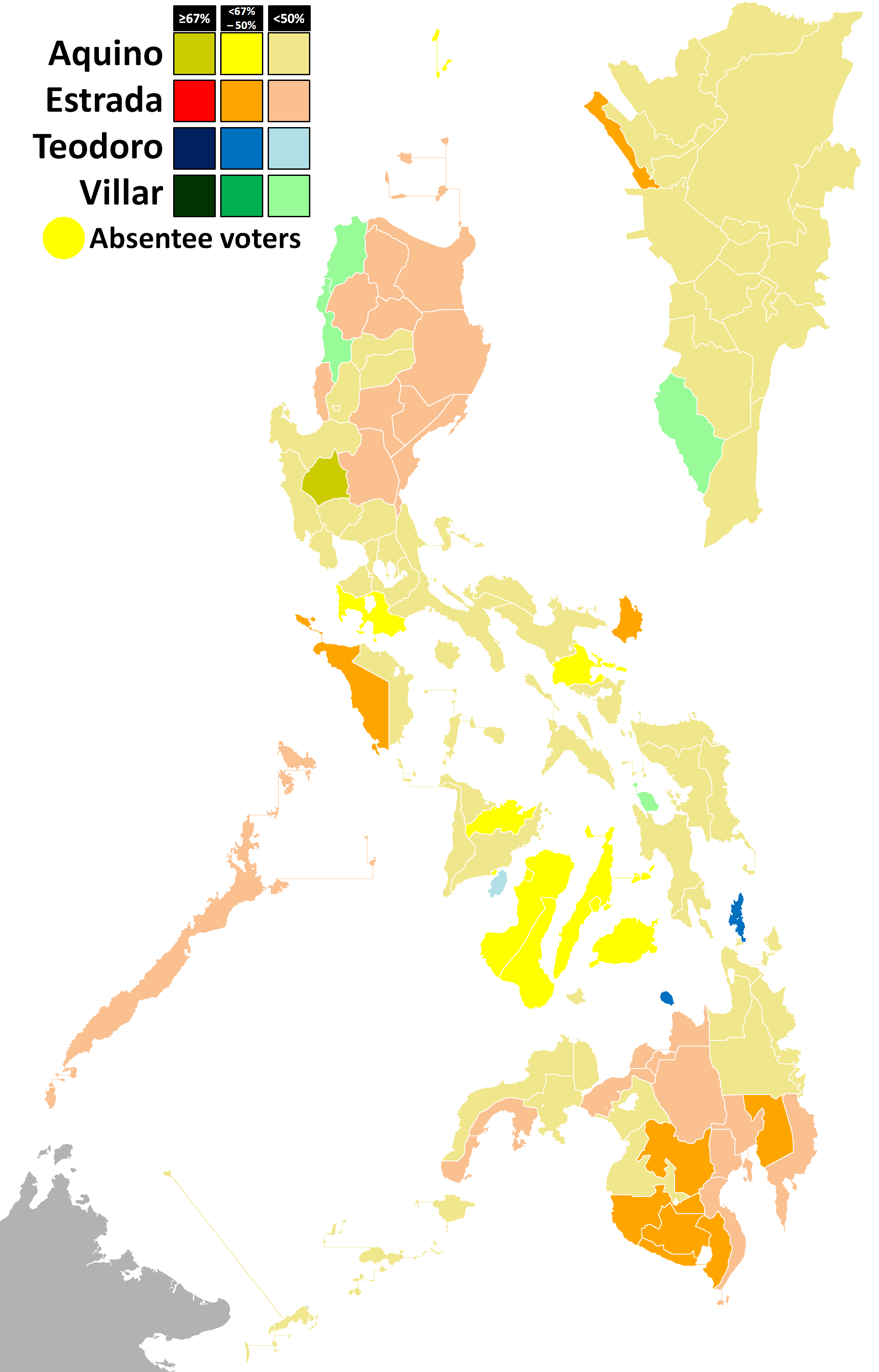
Presidential election results.

The presidential candidate with the greatest number of votes, Benigno Aquino III was declared the winner. A separate election was held for the vice president; the two elected officials need not be running mates in order to be elected.

Candidate	Party	Votes	%
Benigno Aquino III	Liberal Party	15,208,678	42.08
Joseph Estrada	Pwersa ng Masang Pilipino	9,487,837	26.25
Manny Villar	Nacionalista Party	5,573,835	15.42
Gilbert Teodoro	Lakas–Kampi–CMD	4,095,839	11.33
Eddie Villanueva	Bangon Pilipinas	1,125,878	3.12
Dick Gordon	Bagumbayan–VNP	501,727	1.39
Nicanor Perlas	Independent	54,575	0.15
Jamby Madrigal	Independent	46,489	0.13
John Carlos de los Reyes	Ang Kapatiran	44,244	0.12
Total		36,139,102	100.00
Valid votes		36,139,102	94.73
Invalid/blank votes (Note: Includes 181,985 votes for Vetellano Acosta (Kilusang Bagong Lipunan) who was disqualified after the ballots were printed.)		2,010,269	5.27
Total votes		38,149,371	100.00
Registered voters/turnout		51,317,073	74.34
Source: COMELEC

=== Vice president ===
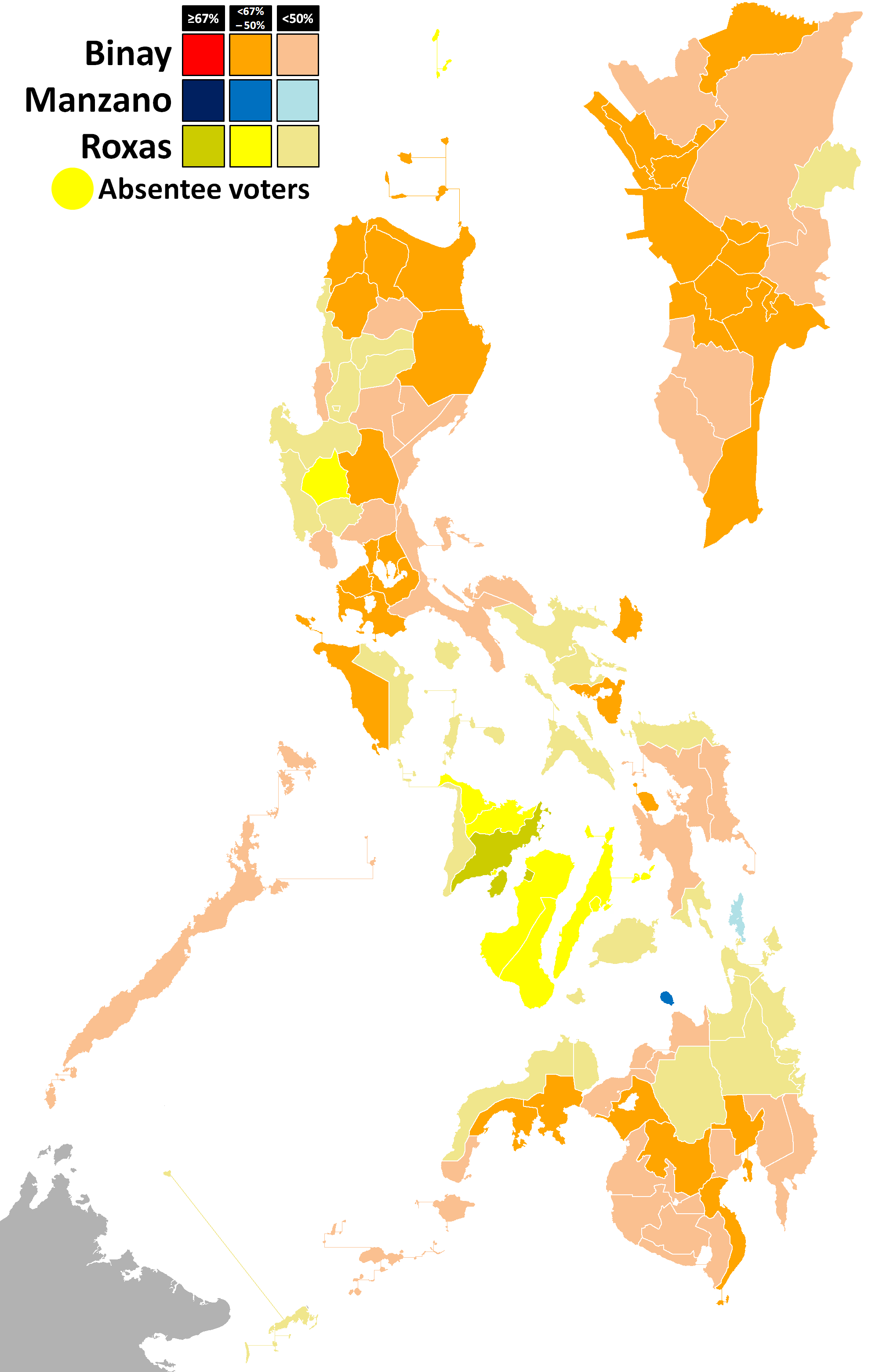
Vice presidential results.

Candidate	Party	Votes	%
Jejomar Binay (Note: Running mate of Joseph Estrada (Pwersa ng Masang Pilipino))	PDP–Laban	14,645,574	41.65
Mar Roxas	Liberal Party	13,918,490	39.58
Loren Legarda (Note: Running mate of Manny Villar (Nacionalista Party))	Nationalist People's Coalition	4,294,664	12.21
Bayani Fernando	Bagumbayan–VNP	1,017,631	2.89
Edu Manzano	Lakas–Kampi–CMD	807,728	2.30
Perfecto Yasay Jr.	Bangon Pilipinas	364,652	1.04
Jay Sonza (Note: Running mate of Vetellano Acosta (Kilusang Bagong Lipunan) who was disqualified)	Kilusang Bagong Lipunan	64,230	0.18
Dominador Chipeco Jr.	Ang Kapatiran	52,562	0.15
Total		35,165,531	100.00
Valid votes		35,165,531	92.18
Invalid/blank votes		2,983,840	7.82
Total votes		38,149,371	–
Registered voters/turnout		51,317,073	74.34
Source: COMELEC

=== Congress ===
==== Senate ====
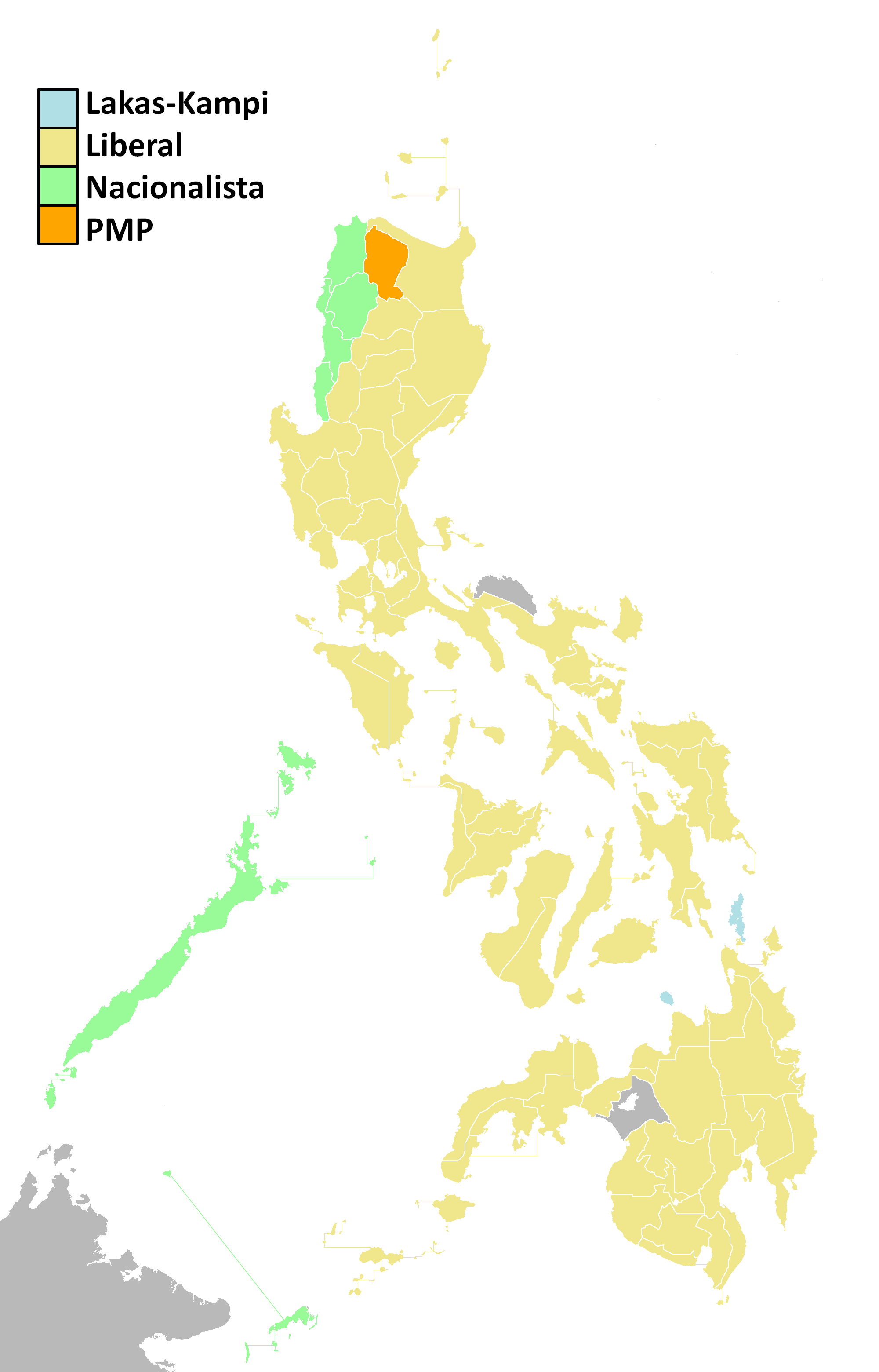
Parties that had the plurality of votes in each province.

Representation of results; seats contested are inside the box. Lakas-Kampi Liberal Party Nacionalista Party NPC PMP LDP PRP Independent Vacancy

One-half of the Philippine Senate was up for election. The Philippines uses the plurality-at-large voting system for the Senate race.

Candidate	Party or alliance		Votes	%
Bong Revilla	Lakas Kampi CMD (Note: Guest candidate of Pwersa ng Masang Pilipino) (Note: Guest candidate of Nacionalista Party)		19,513,521	51.15
Jinggoy Estrada	Pwersa ng Masang Pilipino		18,925,925	49.61
Miriam Defensor Santiago	Nacionalista Party	People's Reform Party	17,344,742	45.47
Franklin Drilon	Liberal Party		15,871,117	41.60
Juan Ponce Enrile	Pwersa ng Masang Pilipino		15,665,618	41.06
Pia Cayetano	Nacionalista Party		13,679,511	35.86
Bongbong Marcos	Nacionalista Party		13,169,634	34.52
Ralph Recto	Liberal Party		12,436,960	32.60
Tito Sotto	Nationalist People's Coalition		11,891,711	31.17
Serge Osmeña	Liberal Party	Independent	11,656,668	30.56
Lito Lapid	Lakas Kampi CMD		11,025,805	28.90
TG Guingona	Liberal Party		10,277,352	26.94
Risa Hontiveros	Liberal Party		9,106,112	23.87
Ruffy Biazon	Liberal Party		8,626,514	22.61
Joey de Venecia	Pwersa ng Masang Pilipino		8,375,043	21.95
Gilbert Remulla	Nacionalista Party		7,454,557	19.54
Danilo Lim	Liberal Party	Independent	7,302,784	19.14
Sonia Roco	Liberal Party		6,774,010	17.76
Ariel Querubin	Nacionalista Party		6,547,925	17.16
Gwen Pimentel	Nacionalista Party	PDP–Laban	6,394,347	16.76
Nereus Acosta	Liberal Party		5,921,111	15.52
Alex Lacson	Liberal Party		5,242,594	13.74
Adel Tamano	Nacionalista Party		4,059,748	10.64
Lito Osmeña	PROMDI		3,980,370	10.43
Liza Maza	Nacionalista Party	Independent	3,855,800	10.11
Satur Ocampo	Nacionalista Party	Bayan Muna	3,539,345	9.28
Francisco Tatad	Pwersa ng Masang Pilipino	Grand Alliance for Democracy	3,331,083	8.73
Ramon Mitra III	Nacionalista Party		2,744,090	7.19
Jun Lozada	Pwersa ng Masang Pilipino		2,730,279	7.16
Rey Langit	Lakas Kampi CMD		2,694,213	7.06
Silvestre Bello III	Lakas Kampi CMD		2,468,276	6.47
Yasmin Lao	Liberal Party		2,081,895	5.46
Imelda Papin	Bangon Pilipinas		1,972,667	5.17
Susan Ople	Nacionalista Party		1,930,038	5.06
Martin Bautista	Liberal Party		1,890,152	4.95
Rodolfo Plaza	Pwersa ng Masang Pilipino	Nationalist People's Coalition	1,517,905	3.98
JV Bautista	Pwersa ng Masang Pilipino		1,415,117	3.71
Ramon Guico Jr.	Lakas Kampi CMD		1,264,982	3.32
Raul Lambino	Lakas Kampi CMD		1,156,294	3.03
Hector Villanueva	Kilusang Bagong Lipunan		979,708	2.57
Ramoncito Ocampo	Bangon Pilipinas		944,725	2.48
Kata Inocencio	Bangon Pilipinas		888,771	2.33
Jovito Palparan	Independent		825,208	2.16
Alex Tinsay	Bangon Pilipinas		728,339	1.91
Zafrullah Alonto	Bangon Pilipinas		712,628	1.87
Reginald Tamayo	Ang Kapatiran		680,211	1.78
Nanette Espinosa	Kilusang Bagong Lipunan		607,569	1.59
Regalado Maambong	Pwersa ng Masang Pilipino	Kilusang Bagong Lipunan	545,967	1.43
Shariff Ibrahim Albani	Kilusang Bagong Lipunan		508,558	1.33
Rizalito David	Ang Kapatiran		504,259	1.32
Israel Virgines	Bangon Pilipinas		455,332	1.19
Zosimo Paredes	Bangon Pilipinas		437,439	1.15
Adrian Sison	Ang Kapatiran		418,055	1.10
Reynaldo Princesa	Independent		364,245	0.95
Jo Aurea Imbong	Ang Kapatiran		362,457	0.95
Henry Adz Nikabulin	Bangon Pilipinas		346,848	0.91
Henry Caunan	PDP–Laban		240,676	0.63
Manuel Valdehuesa Jr.	Ang Kapatiran		201,118	0.53
Hector Tarrazona	Ang Kapatiran		168,386	0.44
Ma. Gracia Riñoza-Plazo	Ang Kapatiran		151,755	0.40
Alma Lood	Kilusang Bagong Lipunan		128,045	0.34
Total			297,036,114	100.00
Total votes			38,149,371	–
Registered voters/turnout			51,317,073	74.34

==== House of Representatives ====
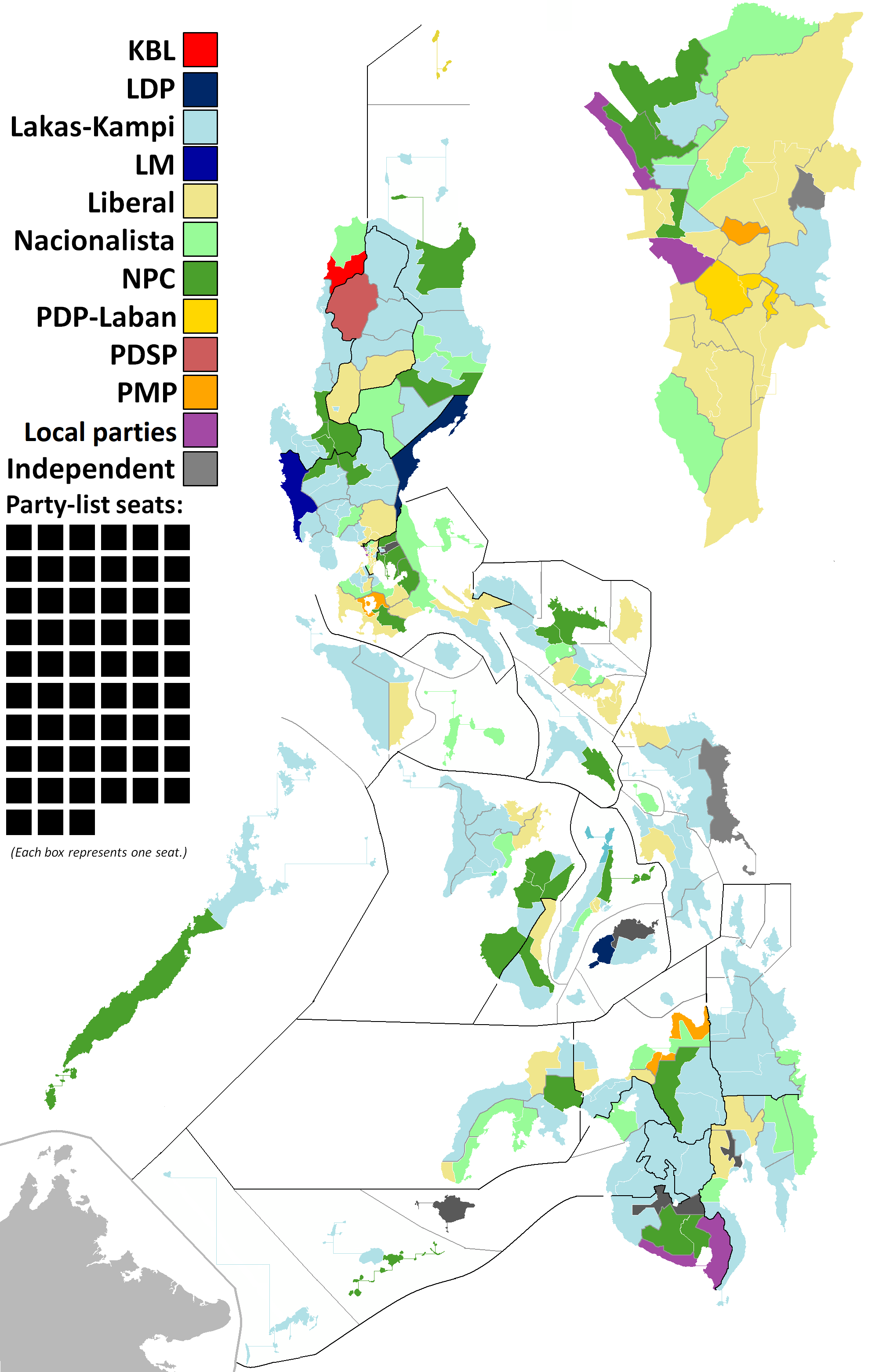
House of Representative elections results for representatives elected via congressional districts.

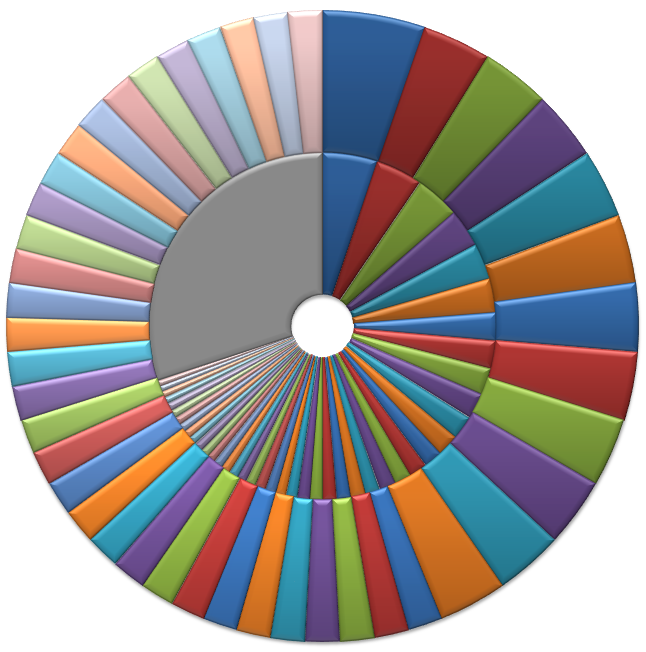
Result of the party-list election: inner ring is the proportion of votes, outer ring is the proportion of seats won. The large gray slice on the inner ring represents all parties that did not win a seat.

All seats in the House were up for election, elections were done for legislative districts and party-list.

===== Elections at congressional districts =====
Party	Votes	%	Seats	+/–
Lakas Kampi CMD	12,769,649	37.41	106	New
Liberal Party	6,802,227	19.93	47	+24
Nationalist People's Coalition	5,450,135	15.97	29	+1
Nacionalista Party	3,872,637	11.35	25	+14
Pwersa ng Masang Pilipino	853,619	2.50	4	0
PDP–Laban	246,697	0.72	2	−3
Bigkis Pinoy Movement	206,929	0.61	0	0
Partido Demokratiko Sosyalista ng Pilipinas	171,345	0.50	1	−2
Laban ng Demokratikong Pilipino	162,434	0.48	2	−3
Kilusang Bagong Lipunan	158,416	0.46	1	0
Aksyon Demokratiko	151,434	0.44	0	0
Kugi Uswag Sugbo	126,144	0.37	0	0
People's Champ Movement	120,052	0.35	1	New
Lapiang Manggagawa	86,556	0.25	1	New
Partido Navoteño	76,276	0.22	1	New
Bagumbayan–VNP	74,319	0.22	0	0
Kabalikat ng Bayan sa Kaunlaran	70,852	0.21	1	New
Sarangani Reconciliation and Reformation Organization	60,899	0.18	0	0
Partido Magdiwang	47,840	0.14	1	New
Grand Alliance for Democracy	47,677	0.14	0	0
Ugyon Kita Capiz	45,859	0.13	0	0
Ang Kapatiran	45,631	0.13	0	0
Aton Tamdon Utod Negrosa-non	42,796	0.13	0	0
Philippine Green Republican Party	21,636	0.06	0	0
Lingkod Taguig	16,990	0.05	0	−1
Bangon Pilipinas	11,294	0.03	0	0
Kapayapaan, Kaunlaran at Katarungan	11,076	0.03	0	0
Lapiang Manggagawa Workers and Peasants Party	8,894	0.03	0	0
Buklod	876	0.00	0	0
Independent	2,371,949	6.95	7	−3
Party-list seats			57	+4
Total	34,133,138	100.00	286	+15
Valid votes	34,133,138	89.47		
Invalid/blank votes	4,016,233	10.53		
Total votes	38,149,371	100.00		
Registered voters/turnout	51,317,073	74.34		

===== Party-list election =====
Party	Votes	%	+/–	Seats	+/–
Ako Bicol Political Party	1,524,006	5.06	New	3	New
Senior Citizens Partylist	1,296,950	4.31	+2.98	2	+1
Buhay Hayaan Yumabong	1,250,467	4.16	−3.14	2	−1
Akbayan	1,061,947	3.53	+0.62	2	0
Gabriela Women's Party	1,006,752	3.35	−0.53	2	0
Cooperative NATCCO Network Party	944,864	3.14	+0.58	2	0
1st Consumers Alliance for Rural Energy	770,015	2.56	New	2	New
Abono	766,993	2.55	+0.43	2	0
Bayan Muna	750,100	2.49	−3.62	2	−1
An Waray	712,405	2.37	+0.36	2	0
Citizens' Battle Against Corruption	653,399	2.17	−2.55	2	0
A Teacher Partylist	617,898	2.05	−1.01	2	0
Agricultural Sector Alliance of the Philippines	516,052	1.71	−0.34	1	−1
Butil Farmers Party	507,091	1.69	−0.86	1	−1
Alliance for Barangay Concerns	471,407	1.57	+1.01	0	0
Anakpawis	447,201	1.49	−0.82	1	−1
Kabataan	418,776	1.39	−0.04	1	0
LPG Marketers Association	417,771	1.39	New	1	New
Abante Mindanao	378,345	1.26	New	1	New
ACT Teachers	372,903	1.24	New	1	New
Ang Asosasyon Sang Mangunguma nga Bisaya-Owa Mangunguma	357,804	1.19	New	1	New
You Against Corruption and Poverty	337,487	1.12	−0.95	1	0
Association of Philippine Electric Cooperatives	313,689	1.04	−2.83	1	−1
Alliance for Nationalism and Democracy	297,984	0.99	−0.19	1	0
Kasangga sa Kaunlaran	296,695	0.99	−0.07	1	0
Bagong Henerasyon	293,079	0.97	New	1	New
Ang Galing Pinoy	269,273	0.89	+0.78	1	New
Agbiag! Timpuyog Ilocano	263,234	0.87	+0.55	1	New
Puwersa ng Bayaning Atleta	258,869	0.86	+0.41	1	New
Arts, Business and Science Professionals	257,457	0.86	−0.61	1	0
Trade Union Congress Party	245,031	0.81	−0.21	1	0
Alyansa ng mga Grupong Haligi ng Agham at Teknolohiya Para sa Mamamayan	242,630	0.81	−0.10	1	New
Democratic Independent Workers' Association	239,029	0.79	+0.12	1	New
Kapatiran ng mga Nakulong na Walang Sala	234,788	0.78	−0.65	1	0
Kalinga-Advocacy for Social Empowerment and Nation Building Through Easing Poverty	230,516	0.77	New	1	New
Ang Laban ng Indigong Filipino	227,431	0.76	−0.67	1	0
Alagad	227,281	0.76	−1.88	1	−1
1-United Transport Koalisyon	220,617	0.73	−0.30	1	0
Una ang Pamilya	218,181	0.73	+0.11	1	New
Alliance of Volunteer Educators	216,100	0.72	+0.03	1	New
Aangat Tayo	177,503	0.59	−0.66	1	0
Adhikaing Tinataguyod ng Kooperatiba	175,636	0.58	New	1	New
Kasosyo Producer-Consumer Exchange Association	171,589	0.57	+0.52	1	New
Association of Laborers and Employees	170,543	0.57	New	1	New
Alay Buhay Community Development Foundation	164,044	0.55	New	1	New
Aksyon Magsasaka Partido Tinig ng Masa	162,972	0.54	New	0	0
Anak Mindanao	161,418	0.54	−1.63	0	−2
Katipunan ng mga Anak ng Bayan All Filipino Democratic Movement	161,127	0.54	New	0	0
Veterans Freedom Party	155,672	0.52	−0.71	0	−1
Alliance for Rural and Agrarian Reconstruction	147,408	0.49	New	0	0
Atong Paglaum	146,363	0.49	New	0	0
Pilipino Association for Country-Urban Poor Youth Advancement and Welfare	143,553	0.48	New	0	0
Abante Tribung Makabansa	142,988	0.48	New	0	0
Angat Ating Kabuhayan Pilipinas	142,417	0.47	−0.42	0	0
Partido ng Manggagawa	140,257	0.47	−0.27	0	0
Action for Dynamic Development	139,494	0.46	+0.16	0	0
Alyansang Bayanihan ng mga Magsasaka Manggagawang-Bukid at Mangingisda	138,310	0.46	−0.91	0	−1
Alliance Transport Sector	136,828	0.45	+0.36	0	0
Aksyon ng Mamamayang Nagkakaisa	133,048	0.44	+0.24	0	0
Kaunlaran ng Agrikultura Asensadong Probinsya Angat ng Bayan	130,498	0.43	New	0	0
Barangay Natin	129,089	0.43	−0.67	0	−1
1Guardians Nationalist of the Philippines	121,508	0.40	New	0	0
1-Ako Babaeng Astig Aasenso	121,405	0.40	New	0	0
Babae Para sa Kaunlaran	117,518	0.39	+0.16	0	0
Bagong Bayan na Nagtataguyod ng Demokratikong Ideolohiya at Layunin	115,964	0.39	+0.05	0	0
Ahon Pinoy	115,789	0.38	+0.04	0	0
Katribu Indigenous People's Sectoral Party	114,966	0.38	New	0	0
Ang Ladlad	114,120	0.38	New	0	0
1-AANI	113,434	0.38	New	0	0
One Advocacy for Health Progress and Opportunity	111,495	0.37	New	0	0
Confederation of Non-Stock Savings and Loan Associations	111,198	0.37	New	0	0
Kabalikat ng Mamamayan	110,085	0.37	New	0	0
Binhi: Partido ng mga Magsasaka Para sa mga Magsasaka	108,174	0.36	New	0	0
Akap Bata	107,478	0.36	New	0	0
Ang Assosiasyon ng mga Trabahador at Pahinante	107,468	0.36	New	0	0
Agila ng Katutubong Pilipino	105,406	0.35	New	0	0
Coconut Farmers Association of Linamon, Lanao del Norte	105,049	0.35	New	0	0
Filipino Muslim Organization	105,033	0.35	New	0	0
Biyayang Bukid	102,191	0.34	+0.24	0	0
Abakada Guro	97,872	0.33	−0.71	0	−1
Firm 24-K Association	96,292	0.32	New	0	0
Abante Ilongo	94,815	0.32	0.11	0	0
Ang Kalusugan Para sa Pinoy	94,209	0.31	New	0	0
Alyansa ng OFW Party	91,663	0.30	New	0	0
Ako Ayoko sa Bawal na Droga	90,511	0.30	New	0	0
Action Brotherhood for Active Dreamers	88,743	0.29	New	0	0
Philippine Coconut Producers Federation	88,536	0.29	−0.68	0	−1
Ang Tagapagtaguyod ng Sikap sa Ikauunlad ng mga Pinoy	88,522	0.29	New	0	0
Pro-Active on Climate Change Leaders	88,457	0.29	New	0	0
Action League of Indigenous Masses	86,491	0.29	New	0	0
Womenpower	86,411	0.29	New	0	0
1st Kabalikat ng Bayan Ginhawang Sangkatauhan	84,687	0.28	New	0	0
Youth League for Peace and Advancement	82,642	0.27	+0.22	0	0
The True Marcos Loyalist (for God Country and People) Association of the Phil.	81,584	0.27	−0.79	0	−1
Partido ng Katutubong Pilipino	80,064	0.27	New	0	0
Ang Tao Muna at Bayan	79,255	0.26	New	0	0
Agapay ng Indigenous Peoples Rights Alliance	77,270	0.26	New	0	0
Bayani	74,993	0.25	New	0	0
Alliance of Associations of Accredited Workers in the Water Sector	74,152	0.25	+0.11	0	0
Vendors and Traders Alliance of Philippines Party	74,041	0.25	+0.04	0	0
Alliance of Mindanao Elders	71,503	0.24	New	0	0
Alliance of People's Organizations	70,901	0.24	+0.14	0	0
Biyaheng Pinoy Labor Association	70,480	0.23	−0.26	0	0
Alma sa Pagkahikaos at Ignoransiya	70,070	0.23	New	0	0
Akbay Pinoy OFW-National	67,946	0.23	−0.27	0	0
Champions for Innovative Employment	67,800	0.23	New	0	0
Organization of Regional Advocates for Good Governance Onward Nation-Building	67,366	0.22	New	0	0
Parents Enabling Parents Coalition Party	65,299	0.22	+0.01	0	0
Ugnayan ng Nagkakaisang Layunin at Adhikaing Dakila	64,746	0.22	New	0	0
Adhikain ng mga Dakilang Anak Maharlika	63,065	0.21	New	0	0
A Blessed Federation of Farmers and Fishermen International	62,529	0.21	New	0	0
Ang Mata'y Alagaan	62,249	0.21	New	0	0
Sulong! Barangay Movement	60,606	0.20	−0.02	0	0
Alliance for Rural Concerns	57,515	0.19	−2.15	0	−2
Ang Agrikultura Natin Isulong	57,190	0.19	New	0	0
Alliance of Bicolnon Party	55,159	0.18	New	0	0
Aabante Emmanuel Civic Association	54,848	0.18	New	0	0
Adhikain at Kilusan ng Ordinaryong Tao Para sa Lupa Hanapbuhay at Kaunlaran	54,182	0.18	New	0	0
Action for Democracy and Development for the Tribal People	53,510	0.18	−0.03	0	0
Kababaihang Lingkod Bayan sa Pilipinas	50,466	0.17	New	0	0
Asosasyon ng mga Maliliit na Negosyanteng Gumaganap	50,127	0.17	−0.10	0	0
Alliance of Advocates in Mining Advancement for National Progress	49,990	0.17	New	0	0
Adhikaing Alay ng Marino sa Sambayanan	49,893	0.17	New	0	0
Agri-Agra Reporma Para sa Magsasaka ng Pilipinas Movement	49,635	0.16	New	0	0
Alagaan Natin Ating Kalusugan	47,828	0.16	New	0	0
Batang Iwas sa Droga Foundation	45,708	0.15	New	0	0
Kalahi Sectoral Party	45,494	0.15	−0.41	0	0
Green Force for the Environment-Sons and Daughters of Mother Earth	44,100	0.15	New	0	0
Advocates for Special Children and Handicapped Movement	41,809	0.14	−0.18	0	0
Association for Righteousness Advocacy in Leadership	41,159	0.14	New	0	0
Ako Agila sa Nagkaisang Magsasaka	39,448	0.13	New	0	0
Anti War/Anti Terror Mindanao Peace Movement	38,050	0.13	New	0	0
Yes We Can	36,819	0.12	New	0	0
Akap Kapatiran Para sa Tangkilikan ng mga Obrero	36,805	0.12	New	0	0
Sectoral Party of ang Minero (Ang Minero)	36,650	0.12	New	0	0
Pamilyang OFW-SME Network Foundation	35,636	0.12	New	0	0
Alliance of Believers Bridge in Attaining Accurate and Meaningful Advancement	34,852	0.12	New	0	0
Itinerant Vendors Alliance of the Philippines	34,785	0.12	New	0	0
Pasang Masda Nationwide	34,769	0.12	New	0	0
Alyansa ng Mamamayang Naghihirap	32,957	0.11	New	0	0
Bago National Cultural Society of the Philippines	32,942	0.11	New	0	0
Abang Lingkod	32,122	0.11	New	0	0
1-Aangat Ka Pilipino	32,048	0.11	New	0	0
Sagip Kapwa Foundation	31,798	0.11	New	0	0
Koalisyon ng mga Katutubong Samahan ng Pilipinas	31,667	0.11	+0.07	0	0
Alliance of National Urban Poor Organizations Assembly	31,330	0.10	New	0	0
Alliance of Regional Coalitions Against People's Poverty	30,845	0.10	New	0	0
United Movement Against Drugs Foundation	30,651	0.10	−1.47	0	−1
Free Workers	30,540	0.10	New	0	0
Small Farmers and Land Tillers Association of the Philippines	30,001	0.10	New	0	0
Social Movement for Active Reform and Transparency	28,617	0.10	New	0	0
Agrarian Development Association	27,521	0.09	New	0	0
First People's Representative for Indigent Student Athletes	27,229	0.09	New	0	0
Ang Kapisanan ng mga Seaman	26,805	0.09	New	0	0
Abante Katutubo	26,593	0.09	New	0	0
Advocates for Penology Enhancement and Legal Assistance	26,133	0.09	New	0	0
Bagong Koalisyon ng Nagkakaisang Samahan sa Sektor ng Transportasyon	25,547	0.08	New	0	0
Abante Bicol Oragon	23,902	0.08	New	0	0
Akbay Kalusugan	23,394	0.08	New	0	0
Alliance of Nationalistic and Genuine Program for Agricultural Development Towards Economic Reform	22,218	0.07	New	0	0
Alliance for Community Transformation and Service	21,475	0.07	New	0	0
Association of Administrator Professionals and Seniors	20,753	0.07	−0.09	0	0
Angkan Katutubo	19,580	0.07	New	0	0
Alyansa Lumad	19,577	0.07	New	0	0
United Caddies and Green Keepers Association of the Philippines	19,221	0.06	New	0	0
Damayan Alliance of the Aging and Disabled Filipinos	19,069	0.06	New	0	0
Bigkis Pinoy Movement	19,027	0.06	−0.42	0	0
Alay Serbisyo (Workers in the Informal Sector Economy)	18,164	0.06	New	0	0
Alyansa ng Media at Showbiz	17,534	0.06	New	0	0
Alay sa Bayan ng Malayang Propesyonal at Repormang Kalakal	17,125	0.06	−0.20	0	0
Alliance for Philippines Security Guards Cooperative	15,595	0.05	New	0	0
Alyansa ng mga Naulila ng mga Tagapagtanggol ng Bayan	15,520	0.05	New	0	0
Kabukluran ng mga Kababaihang Filipina sa Timog Katagalugan	12,430	0.04	−0.02	0	0
National Council for Commuters Protection	12,386	0.04	New	0	0
One Nation Empowered By Technology	12,335	0.04	New	0	0
Ang Partido Demokratiko Rural	11,680	0.04	New	0	0
Abot Tanaw	10,473	0.03	New	0	0
A Convergence for Mindanao Agenda	8,864	0.03	New	0	0
Alliance and Advocates for Senior Citizens' Affairs	7,379	0.02	New	0	0
Alyansa Lumad Mindanao	6,612	0.02	New	0	0
United Filipino Seafarers	6,121	0.02	New	0	0
Binigkis na Interes ng mga Drayber sa Adhikain	4,963	0.02	New	0	0
Citizen Power Movement	4,495	0.01	New	0	0
Alliance of Vigilant Protectors of Aquatic Products	4,324	0.01	New	0	0
Ang Samahan Para sa Magandang Kabuhayan	4,199	0.01	New	0	0
People's Freedom Party	3,883	0.01	New	0	0
Ang National Coalition on Indigenous People's Action	1,217	0.00	New	0	0
Total	30,092,613	100.00	–	57	+4
Valid votes	30,092,613	78.88	+25.56		
Invalid/blank votes (Note: Includes 781,319 votes for parties that made it to the ballot but were subsequently disqualified.)	8,056,758	21.12	−25.56		
Total votes	38,149,371	100.00	–		
Registered voters/turnout	51,317,073	74.34	+4.73		
Source: COMELEC

=== Local ===
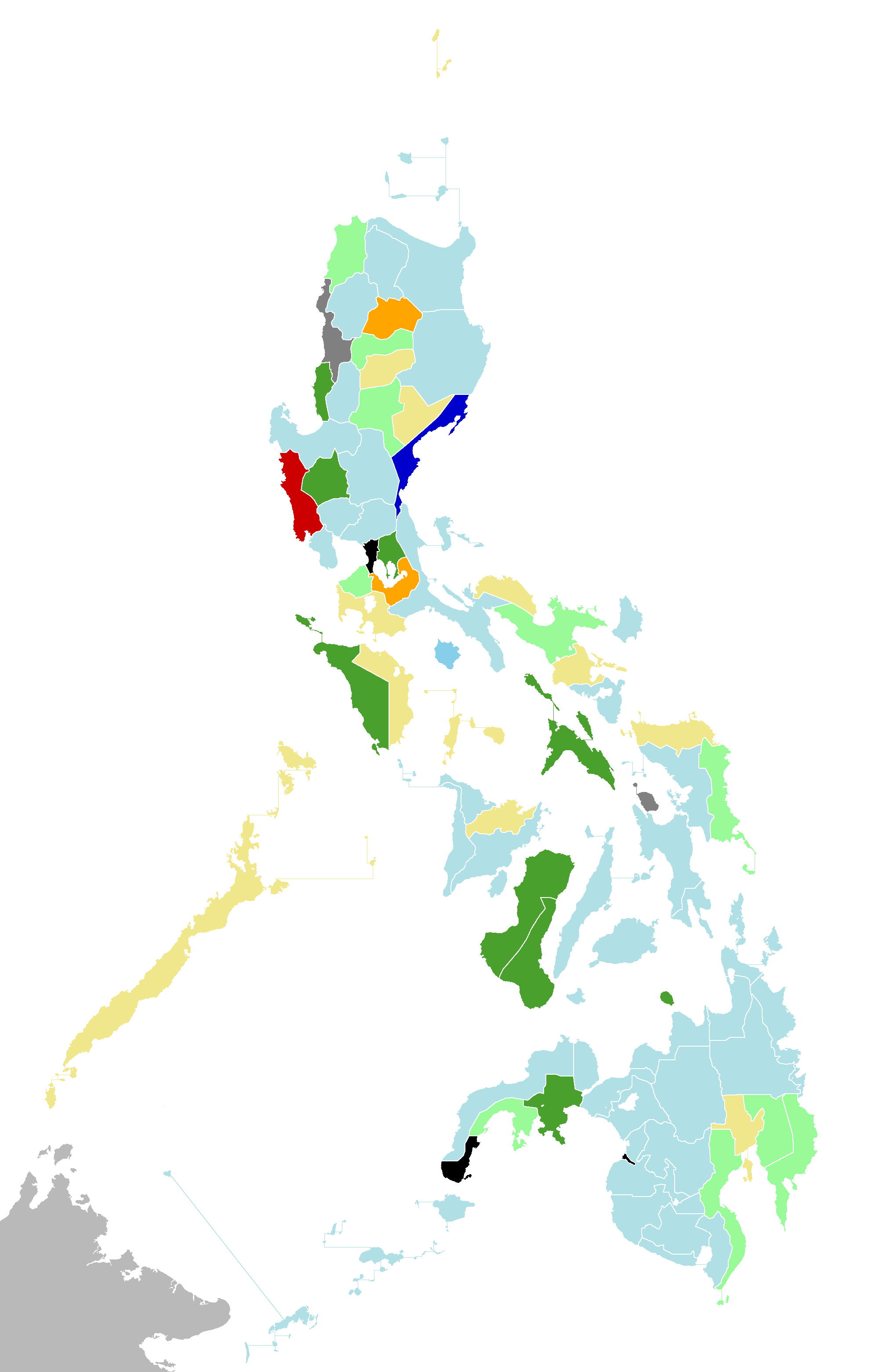
Gubernatorial elections results.

==== Gubernatorial elections ====
The following are the results of the gubernatorial elections by party:

Party	Seats
Lakas–Kampi–CMD	44
Liberal Party	10
Nacionalista Party	10
Nationalist People's Coalition	10
Pwersa ng Masang Pilipino	2
Laban ng Demokratikong Pilipino	1
Lapiang Manggagawa	1
Bigkis Pinoy Movement	1
Independents	1
Total	80
Source: Commission on Elections

The following are the results of the gubernatorial elections by province:

Province	Elected governor	Party
Abra	Takit Bersamin	Lakas
Agusan del Norte	Erlpe John Amante	Lakas
Agusan del Sur	Adolph Edward Plaza	Lakas
Aklan	Carlito Marquez	Lakas
Albay	Joey Salceda	Lakas
Antique	Exequiel Javier	Lakas
Apayao	Elias Bulut Jr.	NPC
Aurora	Bella Angara	LDP
Basilan	Jum Jainudin Akbar	Lakas
Bataan	Tet Garcia	Lakas
Batanes	Vicente Gato	Liberal
Batangas	Vilma Santos	Liberal
Benguet	Nestor Fongwan	Lakas
Biliran	Gerardo Espina Jr.	Independent
Bohol	Edgar Chatto	Lakas
Bukidnon	Alex Calingasan	Lakas
Bulacan	Wilhelmino Sy-Alvarado	Lakas
Cagayan	Alvaro Antonio	Lakas
Camarines Norte	Edgar Tallado	Liberal
Camarines Sur	Luis Raymund Villafuerte	Nacionalista
Camiguin	Jurdin Jesus Romualdo	NPC
Capiz	Victor Tanco	Liberal
Catanduanes	Joseph Cua	Nacionalista
Cavite	Jonvic Remulla	Nacionalista
Cebu	Gwendolyn Garcia	Lakas
Compostela Valley	Arturo Uy	Lakas
Cotabato	Emmylou Mendoza	Lakas
Davao del Norte	Rodolfo del Rosario	Liberal
Davao del Sur	Douglas Cagas	Nacionalista
Davao Oriental	Corazon Malanyaon	Nacionalista
Dinagat Islands	Glenda Ecleo	Lakas
Eastern Samar	Conrado Nicart Jr.	Nacionalista
Guimaras	Felipe Nava	Lakas
Ifugao	Eugene Balitang	Liberal
Ilocos Norte	Imee Marcos	Nacionalista
Ilocos Sur	Chavit Singson	Lakas
Iloilo	Arthur Defensor Sr.	Lakas
Isabela	Bojie Dy	Lakas
Kalinga	Jocel Baac	PMP
La Union	Manuel Ortega	NPC
Laguna	E. R. Ejercito	PMP
Lanao del Norte	Mohamad Khalid Dimaporo	Lakas
Lanao del Sur	Mamintal Adiong Jr.	Lakas
Leyte	Jericho Petilla	Lakas
Maguindanao	Esmael Mangudadatu	Lakas
Marinduque	Carmencita Reyes	Bigkis
Masbate	Rizalina Lanete	NPC
Misamis Occidental	Herminia Ramiro	Lakas
Misamis Oriental	Oscar Moreno	Lakas
Mountain Province	Leonard Mayaen	Nacionalista
Negros Occidental	Alfredo Marañon	NPC
Negros Oriental	Emilio Macias II	NPC
Northern Samar	Paul Daza	Liberal
Nueva Ecija	Aurelio Umali	Lakas
Nueva Vizcaya	Luisa Cuaresma	Nacionalista
Occidental Mindoro	Josephine Sato	NPC
Oriental Mindoro	Alfonso Umali Jr.	Liberal
Palawan	Abraham Mitra	Liberal
Pampanga	Lilia Pineda	Lakas
Pangasinan	Amado Espino Jr.	Lakas
Quezon	David Suarez	Lakas
Quirino	Junie Cua	Lakas
Rizal	Casimiro Ynares III	NPC
Romblon	Eduardo Firmalo	Liberal
Samar	Sharee Ann Tan	Lakas
Sarangani	Miguel Rene Dominguez	Lakas
Siquijor	Orlando Fua Jr.	Lakas
Sorsogon	Raul Lee	Lakas
South Cotabato	Arthur Pingoy Jr.	Lakas
Southern Leyte	Damian Mercado	Lakas
Sultan Kudarat	Suharto Mangudadatu	Lakas
Sulu	Abdusakur Mahail Tan	Lakas
Surigao del Norte	Sol Matugas	Lakas
Surigao del Sur	Johnny Pimentel	Lakas
Tarlac	Victor Yap	NPC
Tawi-Tawi	Sadikul Sahali	Lakas
Zambales	Jun Ebdane	LM
Zamboanga del Norte	Rolando Yebes	Lakas
Zamboanga del Sur	Antonio Cerilles	NPC
Zamboanga Sibugay	Rommel Jalosjos	Nacionalista
Source: Commission on Elections

==== Vice gubernatorial elections ====
The following are the results of the vice gubernatorial elections by party:

Party	Seats
Lakas–Kampi–CMD	46
Liberal Party	11
Nacionalista Party	9
Nationalist People's Coalition	7
Bigkis Pinoy Movement	1
Independents	6
Total	80
Source: Commission on Elections

The following are the results of the vice gubernatorial elections by province:

Province	Elected vice governor	Party
Abra	Rolando Somera	Lakas
Agusan del Norte	Enrico Corvera	Lakas
Agusan del Sur	Santiago Cane Jr.	Lakas
Aklan	Gabrielle Calizo-Quimpo	Nacionalista
Albay	Harold Imperial	Lakas
Antique	Rosie Dimamay	Lakas
Apayao	Hector Reuel Pascua	Lakas
Aurora	Gerardo Noveras	Liberal
Basilan	Al-Rasheed Ahmad Sakkalahul	Lakas
Bataan	Efren Dominic Pascual Jr.	Nacionalista
Batanes	Ferdinand Elica	Lakas
Batangas	Mark Leviste	Liberal
Benguet	Cresencio Pacalso	Lakas
Biliran	Manuel Montejo Jr.	Lakas
Bohol	Concepcion Lim	Lakas
Bukidnon	Jose Maria Zubiri Jr.	Lakas
Bulacan	Daniel Fernando	Lakas
Cagayan	Leonides Fausto	Nacionalista
Camarines Norte	Jonah Pedro Pimentel	Lakas
Camarines Sur	Fortunato Peña	Nacionalista
Camiguin	Leo Lasacar	Lakas
Capiz	Esteban Evan Contreras	Liberal
Catanduanes	Jose Teves Jr.	Lakas
Cavite	Recto Cantimbuhan	Liberal
Cebu	Gregorio Sanchez Jr.	Liberal
Compostela Valley	Ramil Gentugaya	Lakas
Cotabato	Gregorio Ipong	Lakas
Davao del Norte	Victorio Suaybaguio Jr.	Liberal
Davao del Sur	Arsenio Latasa	NPC
Davao Oriental	Joel Mayo Almario	Lakas
Dinagat Islands	Jade Ecleo	Independent
Eastern Samar	Christopher Gonzales	Lakas
Guimaras	Aurelio Tionado	Lakas
Ifugao	Pedro Mayam-o	Liberal
Ilocos Norte	Angelo Barba	Lakas
Ilocos Sur	Deogracias Victor Savellano	Lakas
Iloilo	Oscar Garin Jr.	Lakas
Isabela	Rodolfo Albano III	Lakas
Kalinga	Allen Jesse Mangaoang	Nacionalista
La Union	Aurelio Augusto Nisce	Lakas
Laguna	Caesar Perez	Bigkis
Lanao del Norte	Irma Ali	Lakas
Lanao del Sur	Arsad Marohombsar	Lakas
Leyte	Maria Mimietta Bagulaya	Liberal
Maguindanao	Ismael Mastura	Lakas
Marinduque	Antonio Uy Jr.	Liberal
Masbate	Vicente Revil	NPC
Misamis Occidental	Henry Oaminal	Nacionalista
Misamis Oriental	Norris Babiera	Lakas
Mountain Province	Bonifacio Lacwasan	Independent
Negros Occidental	Genaro Alvarez Jr.	NPC
Negros Oriental	Agustin Ramon Perdices	Independent
Northern Samar	Ramp Nielsen Uy	Nacionalista
Nueva Ecija	Jose Gay Padiernos	Lakas
Nueva Vizcaya	Jose Gambito	Nacionalista
Occidental Mindoro	Mario Gene Mendiola	NPC
Oriental Mindoro	Humerlito Dolor	Liberal
Palawan	Clara Reyes	Lakas
Pampanga	Yeng Guiao	Lakas
Pangasinan	Jose Calimlim Jr.	Lakas
Quezon	Vicente Alcala	Independent
Quirino	May Calaunan	Liberal
Rizal	Frisco San Juan Jr.	NPC
Romblon	Manuel Madrid	NPC
Samar	Stephen James Tan	Lakas
Sarangani	Steve Solon	Lakas
Siquijor	Andre Jesu Cortes	Lakas
Sorsogon	Antonio Escudero Jr.	Independent
South Cotabato	Elmo Tolosa	Lakas
Southern Leyte	Miguel Maamo II	Lakas
Sultan Kudarat	Ernesto Matias	Lakas
Sulu	Benjamin Loong	NPC
Surigao del Norte	Arturo Carlos Egay Jr.	Lakas
Surigao del Sur	Manuel Alameda Sr.	Lakas
Tarlac	Pearl Angeli Pacada	Lakas
Tawi-Tawi	Ruby Sahali	Lakas
Zambales	Ramon Lacbain II	Independent
Zamboanga del Norte	Francis Olvis	Lakas
Zamboanga del Sur	Juan Regala	Lakas
Zamboanga Sibugay	Rey Andre Olegario	Nacionalista
Source: Commission on Elections

==== Provincial board elections ====
The following are the results of the provincial board elections by party:

Party	Seats
Lakas–Kampi–CMD	377
Liberal Party	118
Nacionalista Party	96
Nationalist People's Coalition	66
Pwersa ng Masang Pilipino	10
People's Champ Movement	9
Unang Sigaw	8
Laban ng Demokratikong Pilipino	7
Bigkis Pinoy Movement	4
Partidong Pagbabago ng Palawan	4
Aksyon Demokratiko	3
Bagumbayan–VNP	3
Barug Alang sa Kauswagan ug Demokrasya	2
Bagong Lakas ng Nueva Ecija	2
PDP–Laban	2
Partido Demokratiko Sosyalista ng Pilipinas	2
Kilusang Bagong Lipunan	1
Lapiang Manggagawa	1
One Cebu	1
Padajon Surigao	1
Ugyon Kita Capiz	1
Independents	55
Total	773
Source: Commission on Elections

The totals do not include sectoral and reserved seats.

The following are the results of the provincial board elections by province:

Province	Elected seats	Party	Seats won
Abra	8	Lakas	4
Abra	8	Liberal	3
Abra	8	Independent	1
Agusan del Norte	8	Lakas	8
Agusan del Sur	10	Lakas	9
Agusan del Sur	10	Independent	1
Aklan	10	Lakas	7
Aklan	10	PMP	2
Aklan	10	Bagumbayan–VNP	1
Albay	10	Lakas	6
Albay	10	Liberal	2
Albay	10	Nacionalista	1
Albay	10	Independent	1
Antique	10	Lakas	6
Antique	10	NPC	1
Antique	10	PMP	1
Antique	10	Independent	2
Apayao	8	Lakas	8
Aurora	8	LDP	7
Aurora	8	Nacionalista	1
Basilan	8	Lakas	6
Basilan	8	Liberal	2
Bataan	10	Lakas	7
Bataan	10	Liberal	2
Bataan	10	Nacionalista	1
Batanes	6	Liberal	3
Batanes	6	Nacionalista	2
Batanes	6	Lakas	1
Batangas	10	Liberal	5
Batangas	10	Lakas	4
Batangas	10	Nacionalista	1
Benguet	10	Lakas	8
Benguet	10	NPC	1
Benguet	10	Independent	1
Biliran	8	Nacionalista	5
Biliran	8	Lakas	2
Biliran	8	Independent	1
Bohol	10	Lakas	5
Bohol	10	Nacionalista	3
Bohol	10	PDP–Laban	1
Bohol	10	Independent	1
Bukidnon	10	Lakas	8
Bukidnon	10	Liberal	2
Bulacan	10	Liberal	8
Bulacan	10	Lakas	2
Cagayan	10	Lakas	5
Cagayan	10	Nacionalista	2
Cagayan	10	Liberal	1
Cagayan	10	NPC	1
Cagayan	10	Independent	1
Camarines Norte	10	Lakas	7
Camarines Norte	10	Liberal	3
Camarines Sur	10	Nacionalista	6
Camarines Sur	10	NPC	3
Camarines Sur	10	Lakas	1
Camiguin	6	Lakas	6
Capiz	10	Liberal	5
Capiz	10	Lakas	4
Capiz	10	Ugyon Kita Capiz	1
Catanduanes	8	Nacionalista	4
Catanduanes	8	NPC	2
Catanduanes	8	Lakas	1
Catanduanes	8	Independent	1
Cavite	14	Liberal	7
Cavite	14	Lakas	3
Cavite	14	Nacionalista	3
Cavite	14	Aksyon	1
Cebu	12	Lakas	7
Cebu	12	Bakud	2
Cebu	12	Liberal	1
Cebu	12	Nacionalista	1
Cebu	12	One Cebu	1
Compostela Valley	10	Lakas	8
Compostela Valley	10	Liberal	1
Compostela Valley	10	Independent	1
Cotabato	10	Lakas	9
Cotabato	10	Liberal	1
Davao del Norte	10	Lakas	5
Davao del Norte	10	Liberal	4
Davao del Norte	10	Independent	1
Davao del Sur	10	Nacionalista	5
Davao del Sur	10	NPC	2
Davao del Sur	10	Lakas	1
Davao del Sur	10	Independent	2
Davao Oriental	10	Nacionalista	5
Davao Oriental	10	Lakas	2
Davao Oriental	10	Liberal	1
Davao Oriental	10	Independent	2
Dinagat Islands	10	Lakas	10
Eastern Samar	10	Lakas	7
Eastern Samar	10	Nacionalista	2
Eastern Samar	10	PDSP	1
Guimaras	8	Lakas	6
Guimaras	8	Nacionalista	2
Ifugao	8	Lakas	3
Ifugao	8	Nacionalista	3
Ifugao	8	Independent	2
Ilocos Norte	10	Nacionalista	4
Ilocos Norte	10	Lakas	2
Ilocos Norte	10	KBL	1
Ilocos Norte	10	Independent	10
Ilocos Sur	10	Lakas	10
Iloilo	10	Liberal	5
Iloilo	10	Lakas	4
Iloilo	10	Nacionalista	1
Isabela	10	Bigkis	4
Isabela	10	NPC	3
Isabela	10	Lakas	2
Isabela	10	Independent	1
Kalinga	8	Lakas	3
Kalinga	8	Aksyon	1
Kalinga	8	Nacionalista	1
Kalinga	8	PMP	1
Kalinga	8	Independent	2
La Union	10	NPC	7
La Union	10	Lakas	1
La Union	10	Liberal	1
La Union	10	Independent	1
Laguna	10	Lakas	6
Laguna	10	Liberal	2
Laguna	10	Nacionalista	2
Lanao del Norte	10	Lakas	10
Lanao del Sur	10	Lakas	5
Lanao del Sur	10	Nacionalista	2
Lanao del Sur	10	Liberal	1
Lanao del Sur	10	Independent	2
Leyte	10	Lakas	9
Leyte	10	Liberal	1
Maguindanao	10	Bagumbayan–VNP	2
Maguindanao	10	Aksyon	1
Maguindanao	10	Independent	7
Marinduque	8	Liberal	5
Marinduque	8	Lakas	1
Marinduque	8	Independent	2
Masbate	10	Lakas	3
Masbate	10	NPC	3
Masbate	10	Nacionalista	2
Masbate	10	PMP	1
Masbate	10	Independent	1
Misamis Occidental	10	Nacionalista	6
Misamis Occidental	10	Lakas	4
Misamis Oriental	10	Lakas	5
Misamis Oriental	10	PMP	3
Misamis Oriental	10	Liberal	1
Misamis Oriental	10	Nacionalista	1
Mountain Province	8	Lakas	3
Mountain Province	8	Nacionalista	2
Mountain Province	8	Liberal	1
Mountain Province	8	Independent	2
Negros Occidental	12	Lakas	5
Negros Occidental	12	NPC	5
Negros Occidental	12	Nacionalista	2
Negros Oriental	10	NPC	4
Negros Oriental	10	Lakas	3
Negros Oriental	10	Liberal	3
Northern Samar	10	Liberal	8
Northern Samar	10	Lakas	2
Nueva Ecija	10	Unang Sigaw	8
Nueva Ecija	10	Balane	2
Nueva Vizcaya	10	Nacionalista	7
Nueva Vizcaya	10	Liberal	3
Occidental Mindoro	10	NPC	6
Occidental Mindoro	10	Lakas	2
Occidental Mindoro	10	Liberal	1
Occidental Mindoro	10	Nacionalista	1
Oriental Mindoro	10	Lakas	6
Oriental Mindoro	10	Liberal	3
Oriental Mindoro	10	Independent	1
Palawan	10	Lakas	4
Palawan	10	PPPL	4
Palawan	10	Liberal	2
Pampanga	10	Lakas	7
Pampanga	10	Nacionalista	2
Pampanga	10	Independent	1
Pangasinan	12	NPC	5
Pangasinan	12	Liberal	4
Pangasinan	12	Lakas	3
Quezon	10	Liberal	7
Quezon	10	Lakas	1
Quezon	10	Nacionalista	1
Quezon	10	PDP–Laban	1
Quirino	8	Lakas	6
Quirino	8	Liberal	2
Rizal	10	NPC	5
Rizal	10	Liberal	4
Rizal	10	Lakas	1
Romblon	8	Lakas	3
Romblon	8	NPC	3
Romblon	8	Liberal	1
Romblon	8	Nacionalista	1
Samar	10	Lakas	8
Samar	10	Independent	2
Sarangani	10	PCM	9
Sarangani	10	Lakas	1
Siquijor	6	Lakas	6
Sorsogon	10	Lakas	6
Sorsogon	10	Liberal	4
South Cotabato	10	NPC	4
South Cotabato	10	Lakas	2
South Cotabato	10	PMP	2
South Cotabato	10	PDSP	1
South Cotabato	10	Independent	1
Southern Leyte	8	Lakas	8
Sultan Kudarat	10	Lakas	9
Sultan Kudarat	10	Independent	1
Sulu	10	Lakas	5
Sulu	10	NPC	5
Surigao del Norte	10	Lakas	5
Surigao del Norte	10	Nacionalista	4
Surigao del Norte	10	Padajon Surigao	1
Surigao del Sur	10	Lakas	9
Surigao del Sur	10	NPC	1
Tarlac	10	NPC	4
Tarlac	10	Lakas	3
Tarlac	10	Liberal	2
Tarlac	10	Nacionalista	1
Tawi-Tawi	8	Lakas	6
Tawi-Tawi	8	Liberal	1
Tawi-Tawi	8	NPC	1
Zambales	10	Liberal	5
Zambales	10	Lakas	1
Zambales	10	LM	1
Zambales	10	Independent	3
Zamboanga del Norte	10	Lakas	10
Zamboanga del Sur	10	Lakas	10
Zamboanga Sibugay	10	Nacionalista	9
Zamboanga Sibugay	10	Lakas	1
Source: Commission on Elections

==== Mayoral elections ====
The following are the results of the mayoral elections in highly urbanized and independent component cities and independent municipalities by party:

Party	Seats
Lakas–Kampi–CMD	10
Liberal Party	9
Nacionalista Party	5
Nationalist People's Coalition	4
PDP–Laban	2
Pwersa ng Masang Pilipino	2
Bagumbayan–VNP	1
Laban ng Demokratikong Pilipino	1
Liberal Party/Kapayapaan, Kaunlaran at Katarungan	1
Partido Magdiwang	1
Partido Navoteño	1
Independents	1
Total	38
Source: Commission on Elections

The following are the results of the mayoral elections in highly urbanized and independent component cities and independent municipalities:

City/Municipality	Elected mayor	Party
Angeles City	Edgardo Pamintuan Sr.	Lakas
Bacolod	Evelio Leonardia	NPC
Baguio	Mauricio Domogan	Lakas
Butuan	Ferdinand Amante Jr.	Liberal
Cagayan de Oro	Vicente Emano	PMP
Caloocan	Recom Echiverri	Liberal
Cebu City	Mike Rama	Liberal
Cotabato City	Japal Guiani Jr.	PMP
Dagupan	Benjamin Lim	Nacionalista
Davao City	Sara Duterte	PDP–Laban
General Santos	Darlene Antonino Custodio	NPC
Iligan	Lawrence Cruz	Liberal
Iloilo City	Jed Patrick Mabilog	Liberal
Lapu-Lapu City	Paz Radaza	Lakas
Las Piñas	Vergel Aguillar	Nacionalista
Lucena	Ramon Talaga Jr.	Lakas
Makati	Jejomar Binay Jr.	PDP–Laban
Malabon	Canuto Oreta	Lakas
Mandaluyong	Benhur Abalos	Lakas
Mandaue	Jonas Cortes	Independent
Manila	Alfredo Lim	Liberal/KKK
Marikina	Del de Guzman	Liberal
Muntinlupa	Aldrin San Pedro	Lakas
Naga	John Bongat	Liberal
Navotas	John Rey Tiangco	Navoteño
Olongapo	James Gordon Jr.	Bagumbayan–VNP
Ormoc	Eric Codilla	Lakas
Parañaque	Florencio Bernabe Jr.	Lakas
Pasay	Antonino Calixto	Liberal
Pasig	Bobby Eusebio	Nacionalista
Pateros	Jaime Medina	Nacionalista
Puerto Princesa	Edward Hagedorn	NPC
Quezon City	Herbert Bautista	Liberal
San Juan	Guia Gomez	Magdiwang
Santiago	Amelita Navarro	Lakas
Taguig	Lani Cayetano	Nacionalista
Valenzuela	Sherwin Gatchalian	NPC
Zamboanga City	Celso Lobregat	LDP
Source: Commission on Elections

==== Vice mayoral elections ====
The following are the results of the vice mayoral elections in highly urbanized and independent component cities and independent municipalities by party:

Party	Seats
Liberal Party	12
Lakas–Kampi–CMD	6
Nacionalista Party	4
Nationalist People's Coalition	4
Pwersa ng Masang Pilipino	2
Aksyon Demokratiko	1
Kilusang Diwa ng Taguig	1
Laban ng Demokratikong Pilipino	1
Partido Magdiwang	1
Nacionalista Party/Asenso Manileño	1
Partido Navoteño	1
People's Champ Movement	1
Independents	3
Total	38
Source: Commission on Elections

The following are the results of the vice mayoral elections in highly urbanized and independent component cities and independent municipalities:

City/Municipality	Elected mayor	Party
Angeles City	Vicky Vega	Lakas
Bacolod	Jude Thaddeus Sayson	NPC
Baguio	Daniel Fariñas	Nacionalista
Butuan	Lawrence Fortun	Liberal
Cagayan de Oro	Caesar Ian Acenas	PMP
Caloocan	Edgar Erice	Liberal
Cebu City	Joy Augustus Young	Liberal
Cotabato City	Muslimin Sema	NPC
Dagupan	Belen Fernandez	Liberal
Davao City	Rodrigo Duterte	Liberal
General Santos	Shirlyn Bañas-Nograles	PCM
Iligan	Henry Dy	Liberal
Iloilo City	Jose Espinosa III	Nacionalista
Lapu-Lapu City	Marcial Ycong	Lakas
Las Piñas	Luis Bustamante	Nacionalista
Lucena	Roderick Alcala	Liberal
Makati	Kid Peña	Independent
Malabon	Antolin Oreta III	Liberal
Mandaluyong	Danilo de Guzman	Aksyon
Mandaue	Glenn Bercede	Independent
Manila	Isko Moreno	Nacionalista/Asenso Manileño
Marikina	Jose Fabian Cadiz	Liberal
Muntinlupa	Artemio Simundac	Lakas
Naga	Gabriel Bordado	Liberal
Navotas	Patrick Joseph Javier	Navoteño
Olongapo	Rolen Paulino	NPC
Ormoc	Nepomuceno Aparis	Lakas
Parañaque	Gustavo Tambunting	Lakas
Pasay	Marlon Pesebre	PMP
Pasig	Yoyong Martirez	Nacionalista
Pateros	Jose Jonathan Sanchez	Independent
Puerto Princesa	Lucilo Bayron	NPC
Quezon City	Joy Belmonte	Liberal
San Juan	Francis Zamora	Magdiwang
Santiago	Alvin Abaya	Lakas
Taguig	George Elias	KDT
Valenzuela	Eric Martinez	Liberal
Zamboanga City	Cesar Iturralde	LDP
Source: Commission on Elections

==== City and municipal council elections ====
The following are the results of the city and municipal council elections in highly urbanized and independent component cities and independent municipalities by party:

Party	Seats
Liberal Party	144
Lakas–Kampi–CMD	97
Nacionalista Party	69
Nationalist People's Coalition	39
Pwersa ng Masang Pilipino	29
Bagumbayan–VNP	14
PDP–Laban	12
Laban ng Demokratikong Pilipino	11
Partido Magdiwang	11
Nacionalista Party/Asenso Manileño	9
Partido Navoteño	9
Kilusang Diwa ng Taguig	7
Liberal Party/Kapayapaan, Kaunlaran at Katarungan	4
Liberal Party/Asenso Manileño	2
Partido Demokratiko Sosyalista ng Pilipinas	2
Aksyon Demokratiko	1
Bangon Pilipinas	1
Bayan Muna	1
Independents	53
Total	515
Source: Commission on Elections

The totals do not include sectoral and reserved seats.

The following are the results of the city and municipal council elections in highly urbanized and independent component cities and independent municipalities:

City/municipality	Elected seats	Party	Seats won
Angeles City	10	Lakas	5
Angeles City	10	NPC	5
Bacolod	12	NPC	5
Bacolod	12	Nacionalista	2
Bacolod	12	Independent	5
Baguio	12	Lakas	5
Baguio	12	Liberal	3
Baguio	12	Nacionalista	3
Baguio	12	Independent	1
Butuan	10	Lakas	5
Butuan	10	Liberal	5
Cagayan de Oro	16	PMP	13
Cagayan de Oro	16	Lakas	2
Cagayan de Oro	16	Independent	1
Caloocan	12	Liberal	10
Caloocan	12	Nacionalista	1
Caloocan	12	PMP	1
Cebu City	16	Liberal	16
Cotabato City	10	NPC	4
Cotabato City	10	PMP	4
Cotabato City	10	Nacionalista	1
Cotabato City	10	Independent	1
Dagupan	10	Liberal	7
Dagupan	10	Nacionalista	2
Dagupan	10	NPC	1
Davao City	24	Liberal	7
Davao City	24	PDP–Laban	7
Davao City	24	NPC	3
Davao City	24	PDSP	2
Davao City	24	Bayan Muna	1
Davao City	24	Lakas	1
Davao City	24	Independent	3
General Santos	12	Liberal	10
General Santos	12	Lakas	1
General Santos	12	Independent	1
Iligan	12	Liberal	10
Iligan	12	Nacionalista	1
Iligan	12	Independent	1
Iloilo City	12	Liberal	3
Iloilo City	12	Lakas	2
Iloilo City	12	PMP	2
Iloilo City	12	Nacionalista	1
Iloilo City	12	Independent	4
Lapu-Lapu City	12	Lakas	12
Las Piñas	12	Nacionalista	12
Lucena	10	Lakas	4
Lucena	10	Liberal	3
Lucena	10	Nacionalista	3
Makati	16	Nacionalista	9
Makati	16	PDP–Laban	4
Makati	16	NPC	1
Makati	16	Independent	2
Malabon	12	Lakas	4
Malabon	12	NPC	3
Malabon	12	Liberal	3
Malabon	12	Nacionalista	2
Mandaluyong	12	Lakas	10
Mandaluyong	12	Aksyon	1
Mandaluyong	12	Independent	1
Mandaue	10	Liberal	8
Mandaue	10	Lakas	2
Manila	36	Nacionalista/Asenso Manileño	9
Manila	36	Liberal/KKK	4
Manila	36	Nacionalista	3
Manila	36	Liberal	2
Manila	36	Liberal/Asenso Manileño	2
Manila	36	NPC	1
Manila	36	PMP	1
Manila	36	Independent	14
Marikina	16	Liberal	9
Marikina	16	Bagumbayan–VNP	6
Marikina	16	Lakas	1
Muntinlupa	16	Lakas	10
Muntinlupa	16	Liberal	3
Muntinlupa	16	PMP	2
Muntinlupa	16	Independent	1
Naga	10	Liberal	10
Navotas	12	Navoteño	9
Navotas	12	Independent	3
Olongapo	10	Bagumbayan–VNP	8
Olongapo	10	Liberal	1
Olongapo	10	Nacionalista	1
Ormoc	10	Lakas	8
Ormoc	10	Liberal	1
Ormoc	10	Independent	1
Parañaque	16	Lakas	12
Parañaque	16	Nacionalista	2
Parañaque	16	Liberal	1
Parañaque	16	PMP	1
Pasay	12	Nacionalista	5
Pasay	12	Liberal	3
Pasay	12	PMP	2
Pasay	12	PDP–Laban	1
Pasay	12	Independent	1
Pasig	12	Nacionalista	11
Pasig	12	Liberal	1
Pateros	12	Nacionalista	5
Pateros	12	PMP	3
Pateros	12	Liberal	1
Pateros	12	Independent	3
Puerto Princesa	10	Liberal	1
Puerto Princesa	10	Independent	9
Quezon City	24	Liberal	16
Quezon City	24	Lakas	3
Quezon City	24	NPC	3
Quezon City	24	Nacionalista	2
San Juan	12	Magdiwang	11
San Juan	12	Bangon Pilipinas	1
Santiago	10	Lakas	8
Santiago	10	Liberal	2
Taguig	16	KDT	7
Taguig	16	Liberal	6
Taguig	16	NPC	3
Valenzuela	12	NPC	5
Valenzuela	12	Nacionalista	3
Valenzuela	12	Lakas	2
Valenzuela	12	Liberal	2
Zamboanga City	16	LDP	11
Zamboanga City	16	NPC	5
Source: Commission on Elections

==== Local elections by region ====
- Autonomous Region in Muslim Mindanao
- Cordillera Administrative Region
- Metro Manila
- Ilocos Region
- Cagayan Valley
- Central Luzon
- Calabarzon
- Mimaropa
- Bicol Region
- Western Visayas
- Central Visayas
- Eastern Visayas
- Zamboanga Peninsula
- Northern Mindanao
- Davao Region
- Soccsksargen
- Caraga

==== Local elections by province ====
- Batangas
- Bohol
- Bulacan
  - Marilao
  - Meycauayan
- Laguna
- Metro Manila
  - Caloocan
  - Makati
  - Manila
  - Marikina
  - Navotas
  - Quezon City
  - Taguig
  - Valenzuela
- Marinduque
- Mountain Province
- Tarlac
  - Tarlac City
- Zamboanga City

== International reaction ==
The United States and the European Union praised the republic for the smooth elections. The US embassy was one of the first to hail the general elections.

We look forward to a smooth transition and, after June 30, to working with the new Philippine government to deepen the friendship and partnership between our two nations, and to advance our common goals for the benefit of the Southeast Asia region and the world.

Seeing the patience and the number of people turned in the elections, EU ambassador Alistair MacDonald shared his experience and reflection in observing the Filipinos.

I had the privilege of observing the electoral process in both Cavite and Batangas and was impressed by the manner in which this first nationwide automated election was conducted.

Despite the intense heat, the long lines and the inevitable unfamiliarity of a new process, our observations suggested that this process was carried out smoothly, and the results transmitted rapidly, in the great majority of cases.

MacDonald also expressed that the EU was impressed for the elections being "smooth” and “generally trouble-free.”

He also appreciated the teacher's hard work for the said elections.

== See also ==
- 15th Congress of the Philippines
