= Presidential transition of Benigno Aquino III =

2010 Philippine political process

Transition Team of Benigno Aquino III
- Formation: June 16, 2010
- Type: Quasi-governmental–private
- Purpose: Peaceful/Organized transfer of power
- Headquarters: Times Street, Quezon City, Philippines

The presidential transition of Benigno Aquino III began when he won the 2010 Philippine presidential election. On June 9, 2010, at the Batasang Pambansa Complex, in Quezon City, the Congress of the Philippines proclaimed Aquino as the president-elect of the Philippines, following the 2010 election with 15,208,678 votes, while Jejomar Binay, the former mayor of Makati, was proclaimed as the vice president-elect of the Philippines with 14,645,574 votes, defeating runner-up for the vice presidency Mar Roxas, the standard-bearer of the Liberal Party for vice president.

The transition was in charge of the new presidential residence, cabinet appointments and cordial meetings between them and the outgoing administration.

== Official residence ==
The presidential residence of Aquino was Bahay Pangarap (English: House of Dreams, called Bahay Pangulo since 2022) , located inside of Malacañang Park, at the headquarters of the Presidential Security Group across the Pasig River from Malacañan Palace. Aquino is the first president to make Bahay Pangarap his official residence. Malacañang Park was intended as a recreational retreat by Commonwealth President Manuel L. Quezon. The house was built and designed by architect Juan M. Arellano in the 1930s, and underwent a number of renovations. In 2008, the house was demolished and rebuilt in contemporary style by architect Conrad Onglao, a new swimming pool was built, replacing the Commonwealth-era swimming pool. The house originally had one bedroom, however, the house was renovated for Aquino to have four bedrooms, a guest room, a room for Aquino's household staff, and a room for Aquino's close-in security. The house was originally intended as a rest house, the venue for informal activities and social functions for the First Family by former President Manuel L. Quezon. Malacañang Park was refurbished through the efforts of First Lady Eva Macapagal, wife of former President Diosdado Macapagal, in the early 1960s. First Lady Macapagal renamed the rest house as Bahay Pangarap. During the presidency of Fidel V. Ramos, the house was restored and became the club house of the Malacañang Golf Club. The house was used by former President Gloria Macapagal Arroyo to welcome special guests. Aquino refused to live in Malacañan Palace, the official residence of the President of the Philippines, or in Arlegui Mansion, the residence of his mother, Corazon Aquino and her successor Fidel V. Ramos, stating that the two residences were too big, adding the Aquino family house on Times Street in Quezon City would be impractical as it would be a security concern for his neighbors.

== Presidential Transition Cooperation Team ==
On May 11, 2010, outgoing President Gloria Macapagal Arroyo signed an administrative order, creating the Presidential Transition Cooperation Team. Arroyo instructed outgoing Executive Secretary Leandro Mendoza to lead the transition team. The transition team was created "to ensure peaceful, orderly and [efficient] transition on the 30th of June". On June 9, 2010, the transition team started informal meetings with the Aquino transition team.

== Aquino transition team ==
On June 16, 2010, Aquino organized his transition team in a letter to outgoing Presidential Management Staff Secretary Elena Bautista-Horn. Aquino appointed the members of his transition team; defeated runner-up for the vice presidency Mar Roxas, incoming Executive Secretary Paquito Ochoa, Jr., former Secretary of Education Florencio Abad, former Secretary of Finance Cesar Purisima, and Julia Abad, daughter of Florencio Abad and Aquino's chief of staff.

== Administration and Cabinet appointments ==
Aquino named long-time friend, Paquito Ochoa, Jr., as Executive Secretary. Aquino appointed Corazon Soliman as Secretary of Social Welfare & Development, a position she once held under the Arroyo administration but later resigned in 2005.

On June 22, 2010, Leila de Lima, head of the Commission on Human Rights, accepted the offer to join the cabinet, however, she did not confirm or deny if she will become the new Secretary of Justice. On July 2, 2010, De Lima took over the helm of the Department of Justice.

On June 23, 2010, Vice President-elect Jejomar Binay refused to accept any cabinet portfolio "so as not to burden" Aquino. Binay initially wanted to become Secretary of the Interior and Local Government, however, Aquino said that the post is not being considered for him. Aquino has offered Binay various positions, such as, to head a commission that will investigate the outgoing Arroyo administration, the posts of Secretary of Agrarian Reform, chairman of the Housing and Urban Development Coordinating Council (HUDCC), and the chairman of Metropolitan Manila Development Authority (MMDA), but Binay has rejected all cabinet positions. However, on July 15, 2010, Binay has accepted the offer of Aquino to take charge of the housing sector as chairman of HUDCC.

On June 24, 2010, Br. Armin Luistro FSC, president of De La Salle University, accepted the post of Secretary of Education after meeting with the school's stakeholders.

On June 27, 2010, Aquino reappointed incumbent Secretary of Foreign Affairs Alberto Romulo.

On June 29, 2010, Aquino officially named the members of his Cabinet, with Aquino himself as Secretary of the Interior and Local Government. Aquino also announced the formation of a truth commission that will investigate various issues including corruption allegations against outgoing President Gloria Macapagal Arroyo. Aquino named former Chief Justice Hilario Davide, Jr. to head the truth commission.

== Inauguration ==
The inauguration of President-elect Benigno Aquino III and Vice-President elect Jejomar Binay was held at the Quirino Grandstand in Luneta Park, Manila on June 30, 2010. The oath of office was administered by Associate Justice of the Supreme Court of the Philippines Conchita Carpio-Morales, who officially accepted Aquino's request to swear him into office, reminiscent of the decision of his late mother, who in 1986, was sworn into the presidency by Associate Justice Claudio Teehankee. Aquino refused to allow Chief Justice of the Supreme Court of the Philippines Renato Corona to swear him into office, due to Aquino's opposition to the midnight appointment of Corona by outgoing President Gloria Macapagal Arroyo.

== International reaction ==
- United States: United States President Barack Obama called Aquino over the phone to congratulate him over his victory in the election.
- United Kingdom: Elizabeth II of the United Kingdom was the first to greet new President Benigno Aquino III and their inauguration at the Quirino Grandstand.
- Australia: Australian government Wednesday congratulated Aquino and Binay, underscoring close bilateral ties between the Philippines and Australia.
- Canada: Canadian Prime Minister Stephen Harper, through a letter, greeted Aquino and "looks forward to working closely with the new Philippine government."
- China: Chinese President Hu Jintao and Vice President Xi Jinping greeted Aquino and Binay for their victory in the elections.
- Singapore: Singapore leaders sent congratulatory messages to Aquino.
- Japan: Japanese Prime Minister Naoto Kan sent his congratulations and expressed the Japanese government's wish to do its utmost to cooperate with the Philippines.
- Spain: Spanish Prime Minister Jose Luis Rodriguez Zapatero wrote to Aquino May 14 to congratulate him, wishing him success on his presidency.
