= Mangubat (surname) =

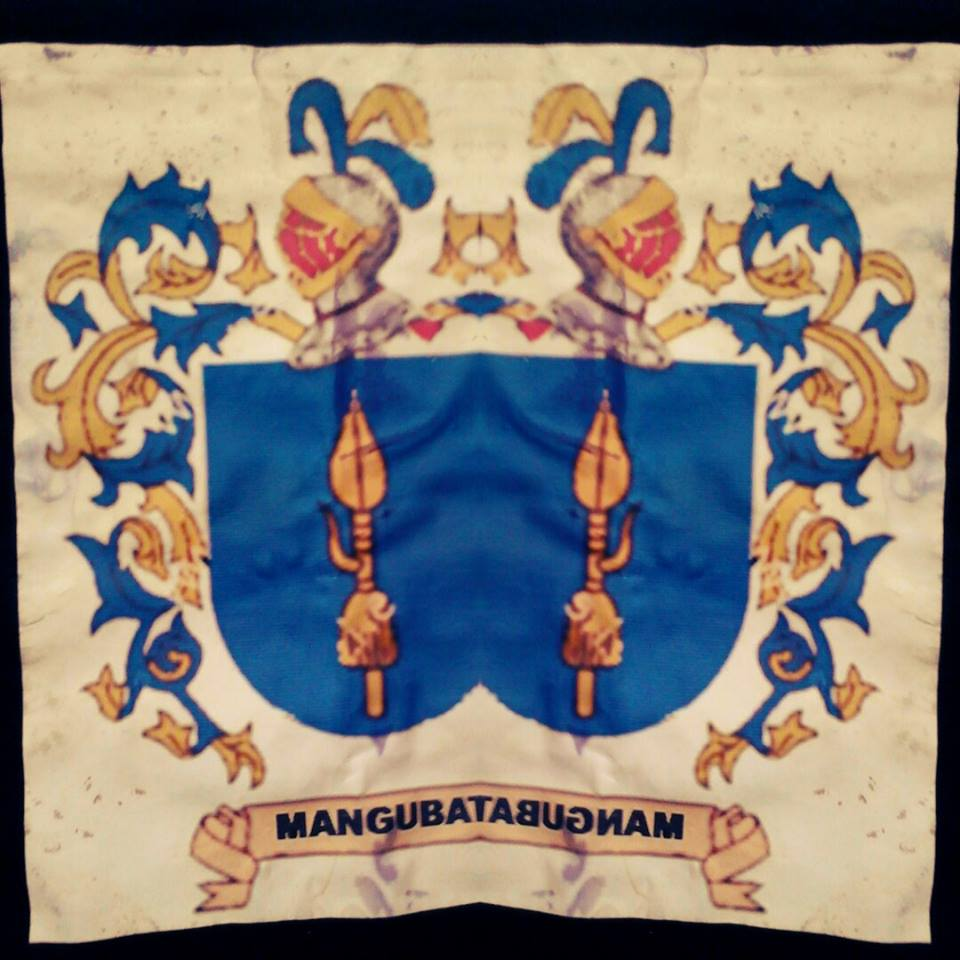
- Mangubat's 16th century Coat of Arms accorded by Emperador Phillip of Spain
- Pronunciation: mang-gubat

Origin
- Languages: Cebuano, Subanen, Old tagalog
- Meaning: " To wage war "

Other names
- Variant forms: Manguerra, Mandigma

Mangubat (Mang-gubat) (Spanish: Guerrear); is a Hispanic Filipino surname of Mactan Island origin which means " TO WAGE WAR " in Cebuano language.

It belongs to a noble lineage according to Vicente de Cadenas y Vicent the Cronista Rey de Armas of the Kingdom of Spain, and the last King of Arms appointed by the Spanish Ministry of Justice.

According to Don Gonzalo Lavin del Noval King of Arms of the Kingdom of Spain, genealogist and Lawyer, the Mangubat Spanish heraldry or the Royal Arms of the family, is an Azure shield, a gold pike (weapon) or pica, set on stick (Note: The symbol of authority. see: sceptre and baton (military)) and positioned vertically at the center of the shield.

As a surname it predated the year 1849 Claveria's Decree. Restricted and exclusively used for the male lines of Rajah Mangubat who was the king of Mactan, son and successor of Lapu-Lapu in the 16th century to avoid any false claims to special rights and privileges belonging only to the Spanish conquerors, knights, Lords and nobles/

When the kingdom of Mactan joined the Spanish Empire in late 1560s, led by Rajah Mangubat the inhabitants of Mactan Island left the Island together with the Spaniards to wage war for the conquest of Luzon, Mindanao, Borneo, and all the other Islands for the purpose of unifying the archipelago originally composed of several independent kingdoms and dominions with peoples of different cultures, religions, languages and ethnic backgrounds into one single state with one central government known as the Spanish East Indies.

recounted by Fr. Juan de Medina in his writing in year 1630 as the most warlike race of people in the archipelago on the accounts of their war exploit and service in conquering the country

Their war stories, conquests, and achievements are displayed on the Mangubat's Coat of Arms blazoned by the Spanish king of Arms and accorded by Emperador Philip II of Spain of the Iberian Union

The successful territorial and political integration of pre-Hispanic kingdoms eventually led to Filipino Nationalism, and Filipino Nationhood that later became a separate and new independent country in year 1946.

== Etymology ==
The term is ancient, appearing in both noun and verb forms in the books contemporaneous with the pintados age.

A mangubat was a man who left his homeland, family, and people mainly for war adventure, for tattooing, for honor and fame, and for the spoils of war, with the implication that he planned to return home with his newly won fortune and fame. It does not include the concept of staying in the place one has conquered for in the Pintados culture for one to have a tattoo one must prove himself in battle.

The word existed in both a noun form (mangubat, the person traveling for war adventure) and a verb form (mangubat, to travel for war or participate in one of these adventures).

Mangubat when related to a name, it usually means marauders, pirates and warriors in the Visayas. Antonio de Morga, in his book published in 1609 Sucesos de las Islas Filipinas (Events of the Philippine Islands), mentions that the term means "to go to war and raid for plunder" and described the native as "a race less inclined to agriculture, skillful in navigation and eager for war and raids for pillage and booty". the term was also used by Francisco Baltazar (1778–1862) in his 1838 book Florante at Laura to means "to go for battle". The term is derived from two Filipino words – the verb mang (to do) and the noun gubat (war). "Gubat" is a common word for war in the language of the Visayans, the ancient Tagalog, the Ilocano people, the Igorot people, (Note: in the Ilocos Region and Cordillera Administrative Region (i.e. the Ifugao and the Igorot people)) in Mindanao, and in the Autonomous Region in Muslim Mindanao. (Note: Tausūg people, and Maranao people)

== Coat of arms ==
Symbolism

The Azure or light blue in color like that of a (clear and cloudless sky). In old times blue was a rare and the most expensive colour therefore only reserved for royalty and the wealthy. That's why in heraldry it is often associated with nobility,

it also signifies Justice, Truth, strength, steadfastness, Zeal, and Loyalty to the Spanish Empire.

The Pica or Pike is a weapon primarily used by frontline soldiers from the middle ages up to the year 1750s. In Heraldry it symbolizes Honorable Warrior and Valiant Knight; war front liners; the emblem of gallant Military and Knightly service, and The perfection of Martial affairs.

In contrast to the lance that stands for " Strength and Prudence". The pike symbolizes "Military Valor, Strength, and Prudence".

The Oro or gold color of the Pica(pike weapon) means of royal descent or nobility(Hidalguia) in general.

The Palo or stick means Jurisdiction, authority, and dominion. It also represents the Knight's Lance. It also signifies the surmounted mast which the lords put in front of their castles or fortresses as a symbol of jurisdiction Abs and dominion.

Old families of Mactan Island year 1700s

1.) Adlawan 2.) Baguio 3.) Balansag 4.) Habagat or Jabagat 5.) Lumongsud 6.) Mangubat 7.) Malang 8.) Maglinte 9.) Patalinjug or Patalinghug 10.) Quilantang 11.) Quilaton 12.) Silawan 13.) Tampus 14.) Tumulac or Tumulak 15.) Tajanlangit 17.) Maligdong

== Legacy ==
Rajah Mangubat and his men specifically the people of Mactan played a significant role in the founding and demarcation of the Philippine Territories under the union of the Spanish Empire

Starting from Cebu they traveled and subdued other regions, Islands, independent kingdoms, and dominions, annexing them to the Philippine territory which was originally composed only of the Islands of Cebu

They served as war frontliners (Picadores)

They Founded and Established organized Hispanic settlements throughout the archipelago, and helped In pacifying or repelling rebellions and war of secession against the newly established centralized governance

Although they did not stayed in the place conquered or annexed but continued In their war journey and in establishing pueblos, they however appointed local leaders (Cabeza) to govern the newly established organized region

In recognition the Spanish Empire which was under the Hapsburg Spain declared them as Hidalgos (nobles) who establishes Hispanic towns and cities

"Their weapons consist of large knives curved like cutlasses (Lagarao or Sanggot?), spears (Bancao, bangkaw) and caraças (shields). They employ the same kinds of boats as the inhabitants of Luzon. They have the same occupations, products, and means of gain as the inhabitants of all the other islands (i.e. Islands of the Visayas and Mindanao). These Visayans which they call Mangubat are a race less inclined to agriculture, and are skilful in navigation, and eager for war and raids for pillage and booty. Mangubat, this means "the same as like to go out for plunder / raid."

== Dissemination ==
The majority of the people with the surname Mangubat can be found in Batangas, Cavite, Bantayan Island, Daanbantayan, Mactan Island, and Zamboanga del sur

== People with the surname ==
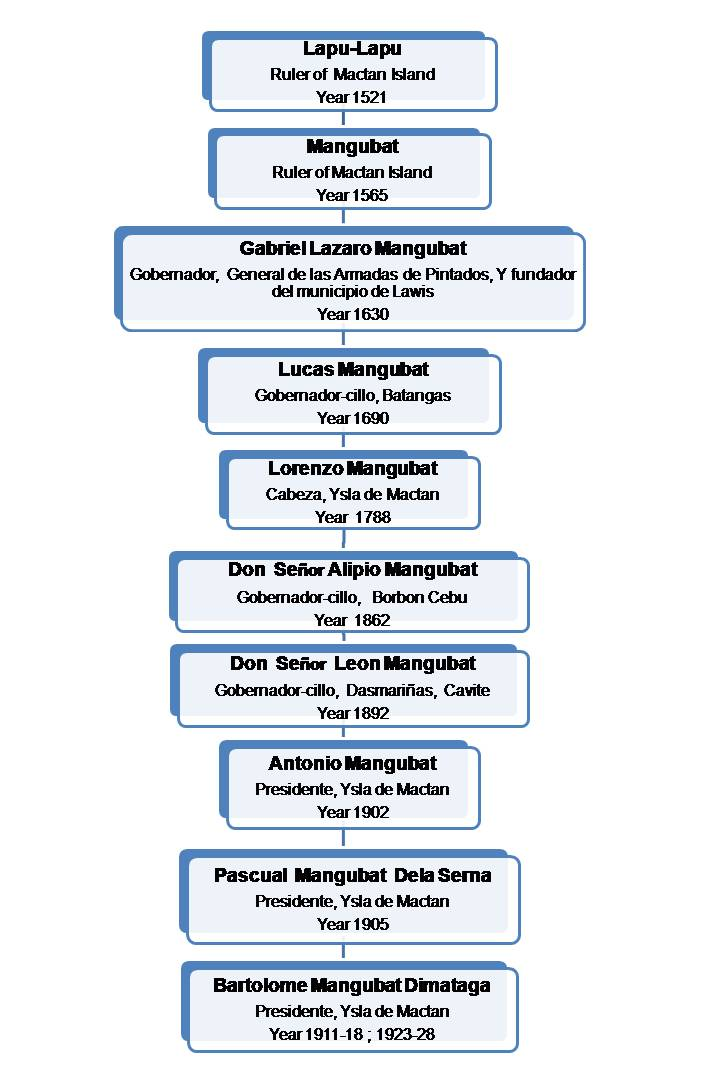
Mangubat line of succession

The time when the Philippines was still part of the Spanish Empire, the Spanish government recognized the authority of pre-Spanish kings in the Philippine archipelago, who then became known as cabezas (meaning Chief or Head) during the Hispanization of the region. From 1565 up to the 1780s the title of Cabeza was hereditary, passing to the oldest son from the first Datu (Kings) who became the first cabezas. The position was passed down hereditarily for up to three generations. The earliest Baptismal book in Mactan Island recorded successive titles of cabeza or Don from Francisco Mangubat, Lazarino Mangubat, and Lorenzo Mangubat.

- Rajah Mangubat – (year 1565) was a sovereign of the Kingdom of Mactan.
- Mangubat - (floruit 1590) - from Leyte? - mentioned and referenced by Fr. Antonio Sanchez as one of the "Grandes" (old term for Grandee) - meaning a Spanish nobleman of higher rank in Spanish and Portuguese nobility in his book "Vocabulario de la Lengua Bisaya". written around (1590s-1616) Published year 1711.
- Lazaro Mangubat – (Born 1580), was a Gobernador of Cebu; founder of the Lawis Government, and the town of Opon in year 1630, he was also one of the Arm Bearers or Armigers in the Spanish Empire towards the middle of the 17th century.
- Alonso Mangubat - (fl. 1636) was a captain of an infantry unit composed of Filipinos that formed part of the Spanish forces to the Mollucas

BATANGAS

- Francisco Mangubat - (Born 1635)- Batangas son of Borme Mangubat y Catongal
- Lorenzo Mangubat - (Born 1635)- Batangas
- Alvaro Mangubat - (Born 1635)- Batangas
- Lucas Mangubat – (fl. year 1690), was an Alcalde Mayor/Gobernador of Batangas year 1690.
- Juan Mangubat y Manigbas - (floruit year 1674) - was a Alcalde Mayor/Gobernador from Batangas.
- Bernardo Mangubat - (Born 1685) Batangas son of Juan Mangubat
- Diego Mangubat - (Born 1652)- Batangas

BOHOL

- Blas Mangubat - (floruit year 1672) - a native from Panglao, Bohol (former Cebu province). mentioned in year 1672 as one of the merchants who supplied coco trees for the construction of the Convent of Santo Nino. The convent's construction was sponsored and founded by Magdalena Briones de Herrera.
- Eleutherio Mangubat - (floruit year 1768) - Panglao, Bohol

Tanay, Rizal

- Maria Condeza - (born 1657) daughter of Juan Mangubat, Tanay, Rizal

PAMPANGA CITY

- Augustina Mangubat y Mija - (born 1653)- Mexico, Pampanga daughter of Marcos Mangubat
- Andres Mangubat - (floruit 1678)- Mexico, Pampanga

ILOCOS NORTE

- Pascual Mangubat (floruit year 1712) Paoay, Ilocos Norte

ILO-ILO

- Augustin Damacio Mangubat (born 1722) Jaro, Iloilo City Son of Juan Mangubat of iloilo

MACTAN ISLAND

- Don Francisco Adlauan Mangubat (floruit year 1680-1745) - was a Maestre de Campo, Mactan, Cebu
- Don Lazarino Mangubat - (floruit year 1738), son of Francisco Mangubat, was a Cabeza of Mactan, Cebu
- Don Lorenzo Mangubat – (born in 1754), son of Lazarino Mangubat, was a cabeza of Opon( Now Lapu–Lapu City
- Evaristo Mangubat - (born in 1762), Lapu-Lapu City, son of Lazarino Mangubat
- Simona Leocadia Mangubat - (born in 1804), Lapu-Lapu City, daughter of Evaristo Mangubat, married to mestizo Espanol Liberato de la Serna of the De la Serna family. She is the mother of the first Rito de la Serna in Opon.
- Don Antonio Mangubat Floruit year 1784, was a Cabeza of Opon (Lapu-Lapu City)
- Don Antonino Mangubat - (floruit year 1884-1885) Cabeza of Opon
- Antonio Mangubat – (year 1898) Mactan Island Cabeza Spanish Government; (year 1902) Mactan Island first appointed Municipal President U.S. Regime. (Mactan Island last Cabeza (Spanish regime); 1st municipal president (American regime)until year 1902.
- Don Basilio Mangubat - Juez de Paz (year 1895) of Opon(Cebu); town Councilor (1902-1905
- Pascual Dela Serna y Mangubat – the last Juez de Paz of Lapulapu Spanish government; (year 1899) Mactan Island President Interim Revolutionary Government;(year 1905 & year 1907-1910) Mactan Island mayor U.S. Government. - Pascual was the first elected President(Mayor) of Lapu-lapu City U.S. government. In 1905, Mactan Island held its first municipal elections, and Pascual Mangubat (de la Serna) was elected town President.
- Bartolome Dimataga y Mangubat (1910–1916; 1919–1928) Mactan Island Municipal President. His direct descendants include, Mayor Mariano Dimataga (Lapu-lapu City); Cabinet Secretary Jose Rene Almendras, former Philippines first lady Leonila Dimataga Garcia; former Vice Mayor (Danao, Cebu) Rosita Dimataga Almendras.
- Atty. Roldan Mangubat – former Board member; Vice-mayor of Mactan Island
- Tomasa Mangubat – daughter of Anacleto Mangubat, great-grandson of Lazarino Mangubat, matriarch of the de la Serna family, and mother of Pascual dela Serna the last juez de paz of Lapu–Lapu and the first elected municipal president(mayor) of Lapu–Lapu City. The visita chapel of Mactan Island where Sr. San Roque was enshrined and is said to have been entrusted to the Mangubat family, who founded the first town(Opon) in Mactan Island in the 1600s, up to the time when Tomasa Mangubat, a daughter of Anacleto Mangubat, married the first Rito dela Serna in the 1800s. Her descendants include the late former Governor of Cebu Vicente dela Serna, former Vice Governor of Cebu Agnes Magpale, Mayor Mariano Dimataga, Mayor Ernest Weigel, and Mayor Arturo Radaza.
- Juana de Mangubat - (born 1738), Lapu-Lapu City daughter of Lazareno Mangubat
- Maria Luciana Mangubat - (born 1740), Lapu-Lapu City, daughter of Lazareno Mangubat
- Rufino Mangubat Floruit year 1748, Lapu-Lapu City
- Prospero Eugenio Mangubat - Born year 1763, in Lapu-Lapu City, son of Rufino Mangubat
- Alejandro Mangubat – (Born 1828) - was a cabeza of Opon
- Capt. Feliciano Mangubat - Doctor / Battalion Surgeon - U.S Army & guerrilla forces World War 2 - Palawan
- Rev. Dr. Osbaldo Padilla – .
- Norsem Mangubat – spokesperson of the Regional Committee of the Communist Party of the Philippines, Central Mindanao
- Rubio Manggubat – spokesperson New People's Army, Eastern Samar (Sergio Lobina Command).
- Jaime Virata Mangubat, M.D. (1927 Manila – 2012 Wayne County, Tennessee, United States) – the street to Wayne County General Hospital was named J. V. Mangubat Drive in his honor. In 2007, the Tennessee Legislature honored him by proclaiming April 13 as Dr. J. V. Mangubat Day.
- Jim Mangubat - Mayor, Wayne County, Tennessee
- Raul Rex Mangubat – City Vice-Mayor of Dasmariñas, Cavite (2016–present), Provincial Board Member of Cavite (2007–2016), Municipal Councillor (1998–2007)
- Atty. Eldwin Mangubat Alibutdan – former Provincial Vice-Governor of Zamboanga Sibugay;former Mayor.
- Maria Cristina Mangubat Garcia - Vice Governor of Bataan
- Juan Mendoza Margubat (year 1898) Soldado - San Martin Batangas
- Justo Apaya Mangubat - (year 1897) was a recipient of the Spanish Military Cross or Medal of Valor with red distinction. As a soldier's of the Spanish Empire he was sent to CUBA, to fight against the Cuban War of Independence (1895-1898).
- Commander Mangubat – Commander of Hukbalahap unit (year 1940s-1960s).

CAVITE

- Don Leon Mangubat – (ca. 1892) was a gobernadorcillo of Dasmariñas Cavite
- Dr. Liborio L. Mangubat - (1924 - 2006) from Imus Cavite one of the pioneers of Philippine ophthalmology. He served as managing editor of the Philippine Journal of Ophthalmology from 1969 to 1975. He was a diplomate of both the American and the Philippine Board of Ophthalmology.President of the Philippine Ophthalmological Society from 1967 to 1970. Dr. Mangubat is a pillar of the Philippine Society of Cosmetic Surgery, having served as its President for 8 years (1987-1994).
- Dr. Dominador I. Mangubat – (1904–1980), is a former provincial Governor of Cavite (1954–1955) from Dasmariñas; also the Major of the (FACGF) Fil-American Cavite Guerilla Forces – for the Battle of the Liberation of the City of Dasmariñas, Cavite. World War II.
- Isidro Mangubat – Municipal President (1924–1927) of Dasmariñas Cavite. The Mangubat Family owned a vast 200 hectares of prime, fertile agricultural land in Dasmariñas Cavite, and one of the prominent political families in Dasmariñas Cavite since Don Leon Mangubat during the Spanish period.
- Doroteo Mangubat – Municipal President (1934–1937) of Dasmariñas Cavite.
- Col. Estanislao Mangubat Carungcong – Municipal President (1931–1934) of Dasmariñas, Cavite. former Colonel of the 4th Infantry Regiment (FACGF) and headed the battle for Liberation of the City of Dasmariñas, Cavite February 3, 1945
- Captain Elpidio Mangubat Barzaga Sr. - former Captain of the 4th Infantry Regiment (FACGF) and headed the battle for Liberation of the City of Dasmariñas, Cavite February 3, 1945

CEBU PROVINCE

- Don Francisco Adlauan Mangubat (floruit year 1700) - was a Maestre de Campo, Mactan, Cebu
- Don Luis Mangubat (floruit year 1850) - was a Capitan Municipal/ Gobernadorcillo of Naga City, Cebu
- Don Agustin Mangubat (floruit year 1858-1860) - was a Cabeza of San Fernando, Cebu year 1858-68
- Don Alipio Mangubat (fl.. 1862) was Gobernador-cillo of Borbon, Cebu
- Don Juan Mangubat (fl.. 1881) was a Cabeza San Remigio, Cebu
- Pedro Mangubat – (Borbon, Cebu last Cabeza (Spanish regime); 1st municipal president (American regime)
- Santiago Mangubat – (Borbon, Cebu 3rd municipal president under the American regime)
- Montano Mangubat – (Borbon, Cebu 4th municipal president under the American regime)
- Salvador Mangubat (year 1929)Justicia Mayor or Justice of Peace- Borbon, Cebu
