= Malacañang Park =

Park in Manila, Philippines

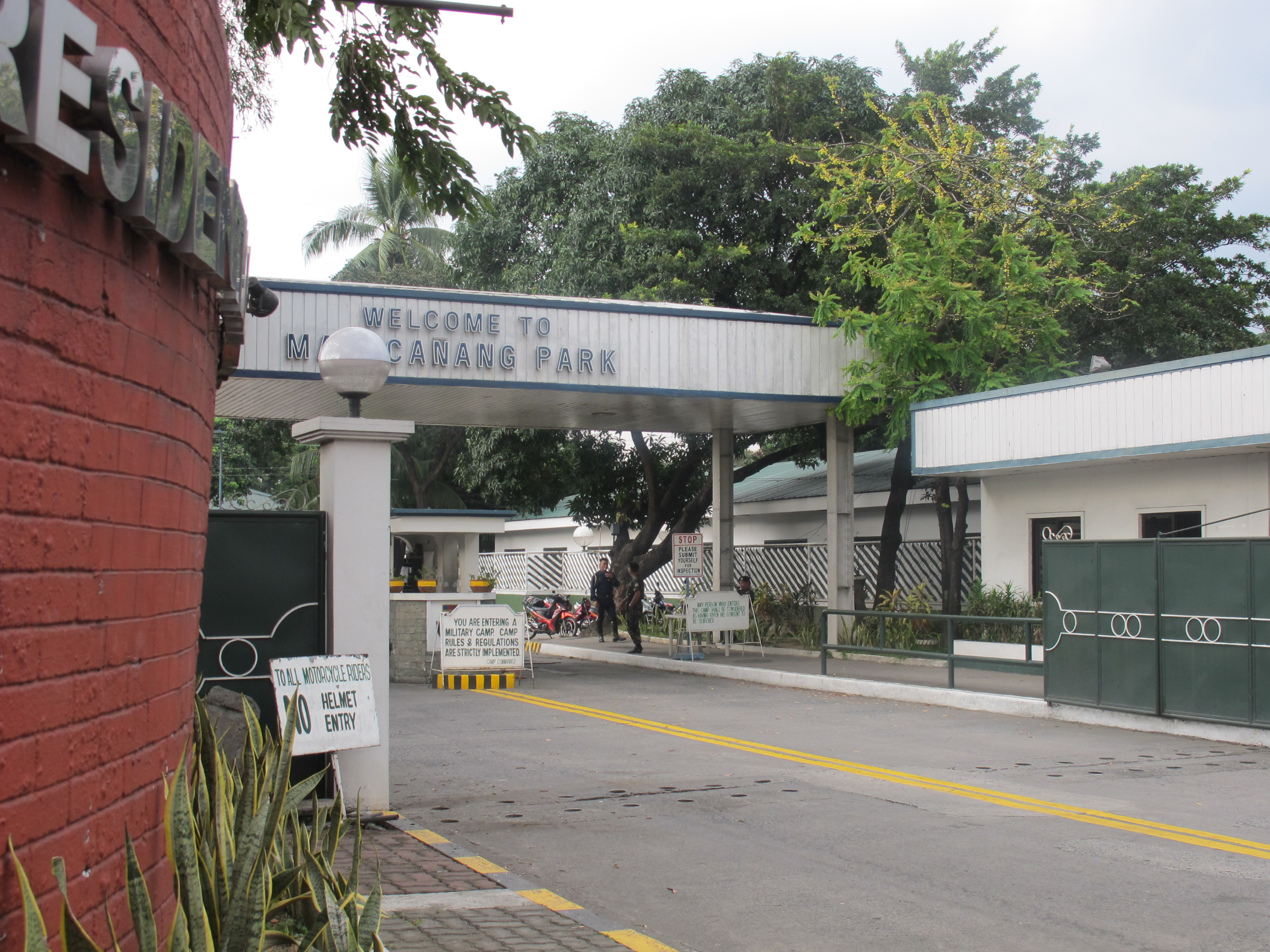
- Interactive map of Malacañang Park
- Location: Manila, Philippines
- Coordinates: 14°35′37″N 120°59′55″E
- Created: 1930s
- Facilities: Bahay Pangulo

The Malacañang Park is a park in Manila, Philippines and is part of the Malacañang Palace complex.

== History ==
Malacañang Park was created during the administration of President Manuel L. Quezon. The land occupied by the park was originally rice fields south of the Malacañang Palace across the Pasig River and was acquired by the government in the late 1930s. The original plan for the park intended for recreational retreat use include three buildings; a recreation hall, a community assembly hall, and a rest house. The buildings were constructed by the Bureau of Public Works and designed by Juan Arellano and Antonio Toledo. In addition to the three buildings; a putting green, stables, and tennis courts were also built.

During the World War II era, the putting green was expanded into a small golf course under President Jose P. Laurel after a failed assassination attempt on him at the Wack Wack golf course. A gazebo was also built during his administration.

President Manuel Roxas's administration expanded the golf course further and established a truck garden as part of its food self-sufficiency program while President Ramon Magsaysay's administration, as part of a housing program by the Government Service Insurance System for presidential guards and other employees, filled in the estuary dividing the Malacañang Park and the Bureau of Animal Industry. The park itself underwent renovation in the early 1960s, which was initiated by First Lady, and wife of President Diosdado Macapagal, Eva Macapagal. The resthouse was renamed as the Bahay Pangarap.

President Ferdinand Marcos' administration was responsible for the repurposing of the Bureau of Animal Industry building as the headquarters of the Presidential Guards (now the Presidential Security Group). Gen. Fabian Ver gained jurisdiction to the recreation hall, which became the PSG Gymnasium, and the community assembly hall which was converted to the presidential escorts building. The golf course club house also became the residence of Marcos' mother Josefa Edralin.

During the administration of President Fidel V. Ramos, the Bahay Pangarap was renovated under the initiative of Ramos' wife, Amelita Ramos, and was made it into the club house of the Malacañang Golf Club with the help of architect Francisco Mañosa. In 2008, the house was demolished and replaced with a contemporary structure designed by architect Conrad Onglao.

== Facilities ==
=== Bahay Pangulo ===
The Bahay Pangulo is a contemporary house inside the Malacañang Park which has served as the official residence of Philippine presidents Benigno Aquino III, Rodrigo Duterte and Bongbong Marcos. It was formerly rest house of the park as well as the former clubhouse of the park's golf course.

=== Golf Club ===
The Malacañang Park has its own golf course. It hosts the Malago Clubhouse which is also used as a meeting place.

=== PSG Compound ===
The Presidential Security Group's headquarters, formerly the office of the Bureau of Animal Industry, is often associated with Malacanang Park. However the Presidential Museum and Library citing a 1940 map, insists that the Malacanang Park has always been a recreational park with the PSG headquarters not within the park's grounds.

The park also host the 5-bed capacity PSG Station Hospital which was built in 2020.
