= Mangubat Street =

Road in the Philippines

Cleto Mangubat or C. Mangubat Street or G Mangubat is a historic street and one of the oldest roads in Mactan Island in the Philippines. The road is named after Anacleto Maurillo Mangubat, who served as Cabeza de Barangay of Poblacion Opon around the 1850s. He is the father of Tomasa Mangubat, who married into the De la Serna family and became an ancestor of the de la Serna family in Opon.

Located in the city formerly called "Opong or Opon", it is now officially named Barangay Poblacion in Lapu-Lapu City. The road was known as Calle Mangubat during the Spanish Colonial time and it is the street where the old municipal public market stands.

It runs parallel and next to the old town Plaza before "F. Martir Street" and "Wisdom Road" (the two roads that now separate the old town Plaza and Calle Mangubat) were created. It is bounded to the East by Opon-Mactan Road (now called G.Y dela Serna Street and M.L Quezon Ave.) and to the West by Calle LapuLapu (now renamed BM Dimataga Street in honor of Lapu-Lapu former Mayor Bartolome Mangubat Dimataga ).

Towards the middle of the year 1600s the time Mactan Island was resettled led by Gabriel Lazaro de Mangubat, he founded a small community in the place known to the locals as Opon, facing the main Island of Cebu.

this small settlement became the mother of all the villages that later came into existence in the Island and Opon was later known as "Pueblo de Opon en la Ysla de Mactan" or the town of Opon in the Island of Mactan

When Opon was first established as a settlement It was the first and only settlement on the Island at that time, that's why it came to be known as "Poblacion" as Spanish term for Population, meaning the place where people have settled or concentrated.

Ever since the original inhabitants of Mactan Island joined the Spanish, the Island was depopulated and abandoned as the native volunteered war and conquest, joined the Spanish expeditions and left the Island "to wage war" against native kingdoms throughout the Country.

They settled in the newly founded Pueblos (hispanized Filipino native villages) or newly conquered and annexed former independent territories during the time of the pacification of Luzon, Mindanao and the conquest Borneo.

Mangubat Street was named by Lazaro Mangubat as "Calle Mangubat" and part of the design and creation of the original Pueblo in Opon together with Bartolome Mangubat Dimataga Street or B.M. Dimataga Street as "Calle LapuLapu" in memory of his father Datu Mangubat and grandfather Datu Lapu-Lapu the two former rulers of Mactan and Rajahs of Cebu in the 16th century.

Lazaro Mangubat was the grandson of Lapulapu and was an Arm Bearer of Spain with a symbol blazoned in his Arm " a gold Pike (Lance) put on stick in a blue mantle" the "GOLD" symbolizes his Royal and Noble descent, the "PIKE" stands for the Perfection of Military Affairs", the "STICK" stands for Authority and Jurisdiction, and the BLUE color stands for Loyalty to the Spanish Empire.
