= Redoña Residence =

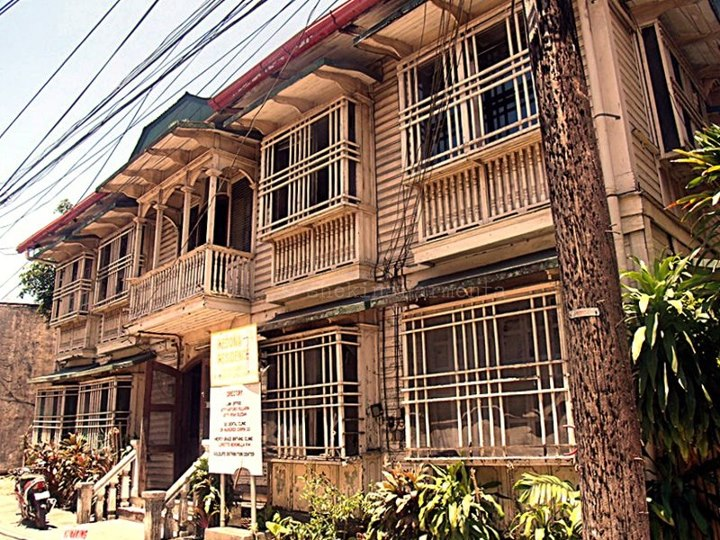
- The building in 2012

General information
- Location: Tacloban, Philippines
- Demolished: 2018
- Owner: Redoña family

Technical details
- Material: Wood
- Floor count: 2

Design and construction
- Known for: Official residence of President Sergio Osmeña (1944–1945)

The Redoña Residence was a historic house along T. Claudio Street in Tacloban, Philippines.

== History ==
The Redoña Residence served a role in World War II, when it became the temporary residence of President Sergio Osmeña when the Allied forces came to return to Leyte in 1944 to end the Japanese occupation of the Philippines. Osmena stayed in Tacloban from October 23, 1944, to February 27, 1945. The site has developed a reputation as a tourist site with ties to the 1944 Leyte Landing after the war.

In 1959, President Carlos P. Garcia and First Lady Leonila Garcia unveiled a historical marker by the Philippine Historical Committee (now the National Historical Commission of the Philippines) at the site.

Over the years, the wooden building would gradually deteriorate. The structure would suffer considerable damage during the onslaught of Typhoon Haiyan (Yolanda) in 2013. In March 2018, the structure was regretfully demolished by its owners.

== Architecture and design ==
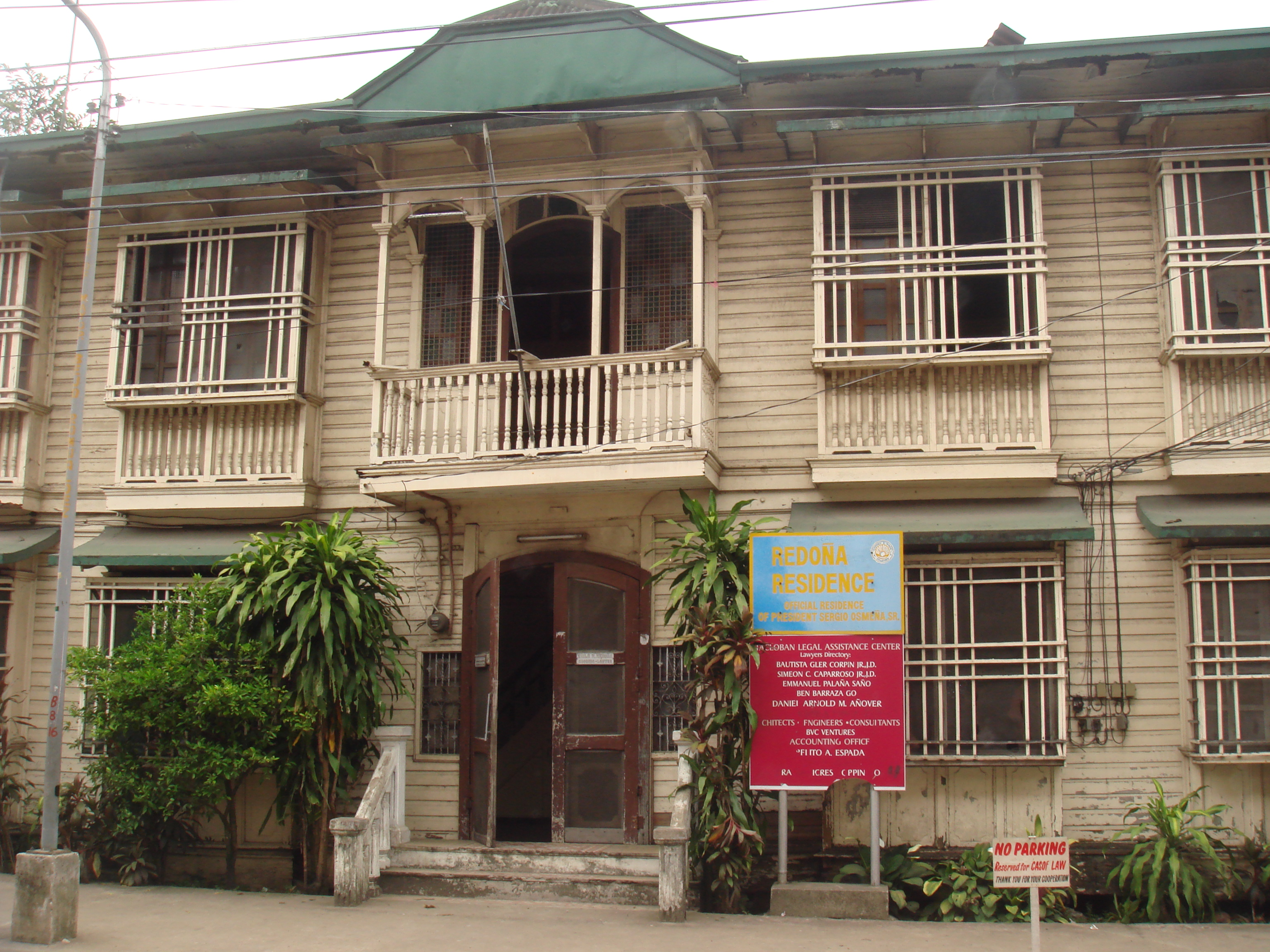
The house in 2014.

The Redoña Residence was a two-storey, five-bedroom wooden house.

== Heritage status ==
The Redoña Residence although had a historical marker from 1959, it was never designated as a Heritage House by the National Historical Commission of the Philippines (NHCP). The structure being at least older than 50 years is covered by the National Heritage Act of 2009 which mandates the preservation of such old buildings. Tacloban also has a city ordinance implemented in 2009 concerning heritage structures. However, both legislations were not applied to the Redoña Residence.

The owners of the house wrote a request to declare the house as heritage site to the National Historical Institute (NHI, now the NHCP) in 2007. However, they were dismayed over the request of the NHI headed then by Ambeth Ocampo to send additional documentary proofs. The Redoñas felt that there was not enough government efforts to preserve the structure.
