= Inauguration of Benigno Aquino III =

2010 Philippine presidential inauguration

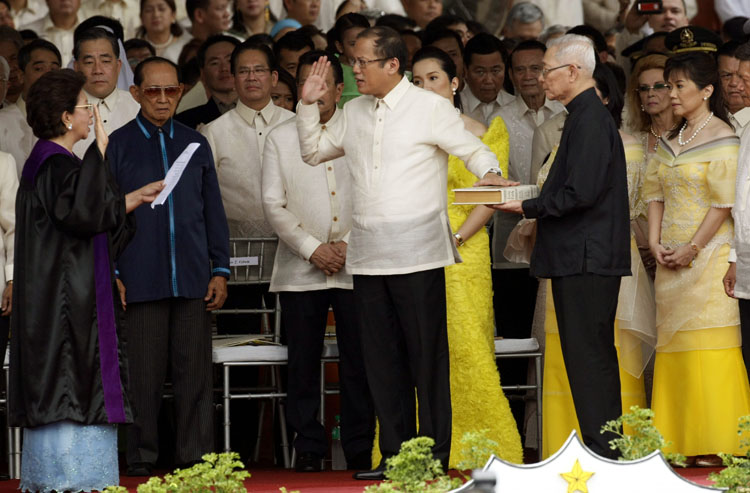
- Benigno S. Aquino III taking his oath of office as the 15th president of the Philippines.
- Date: June 30, 2010; 15 years ago
- Location: Quirino Grandstand Rizal Park, Manila
- Participants: President of the Philippines; Benigno S. Aquino III Assuming office Associate Justice of the Supreme Court of the Philippines, Conchita Carpio-Morales Administering oath Vice President of the Philippines; Jejomar C. Binay Assuming office Associate Justice of the Supreme Court of the Philippines, Conchita Carpio-Morales Administering oath

The inauguration of Benigno Aquino III as the 15th president of the Philippines took place on Wednesday, June 30, 2010, at the Quirino Grandstand in Manila. The oath of office was administered by Associate Justice of the Supreme Court of the Philippines Conchita Carpio-Morales.

The theme of the inauguration was "Tagumpay ng Taumbayan, Panata sa Pagbabago" (English: The People's Victory, An Oath for Change). The Inauguration was organized jointly by the Presidential Transition Cooperation Team of outgoing President Gloria Macapagal Arroyo and the Transition Team of incoming President Aquino.

== Context ==
The inauguration formally ended the Presidential transition of Benigno Aquino III that began when Aquino won the 2010 Philippine presidential election. On June 9, 2010, the Congress of the Philippines in joint session proclaimed Aquino as the President-elect of the Philippines at the Batasang Pambansa in Quezon City. Upon his accession, Aquino subsequently resigned his seat in Senate, which remained vacant until the following election in 2013. Aquino became the second child of a former president to take the office (after Gloria Macapagal Arroyo), being the son of Corazon Aquino, who served from 1986 to 1992.

=== Oath of office ===
Aquino took his oath of office at the Quirino Grandstand, at noon PST (GMT+8) on June 30, 2010, as mandated by the Constitution The oath was administered by Supreme Court Associate Justice Conchita Carpio-Morales, who officially accepted Aquino's request to swear him into office, making her the first female magistrate to administer the oath to the president of the Philippines. This evoked the decision of his mother, President Corazon Aquino, who was sworn into the presidency by Associate Justice Claudio Teehankee in 1986. Aquino refused to allow Chief Justice Renato Corona to swear him into office, due to Aquino's opposition to Corona's "midnight appointment" by outgoing President Gloria Macapagal Arroyo.

Ako, si Benigno Aquino III, ay taimtim na nanunumpa na tutuparin ko nang buong katapatan at sigasig ang aking mga tungkulin bilang Pangulo ng Pilipinas, pangangalagaan at ipagtatanggol ang kanyang Konstitusyon, ipatutupad ang mga batas nito, magiging makatarungan sa bawat tao, at itatalaga ang aking sarili sa paglilingkod sa Bansa. Kasihan nawa ako ng Diyos.

== Inaugural events ==
=== Inauguration ceremony ===
The inaugural ceremony was hosted by Jim Paredes from Apo Hiking Society and Mae Paner, a comedian and political satirist known for her character, Juana Change. The inaugural started at around 11:00 PST with Charice (now Jake Zyrus) singing the Lupang Hinirang. A musical ensemble followed featuring the Apo Hiking Society, Ogie Alcasid, Regine Velasquez, Noel Cabangon, Gary Valenciano, Nina, Christian Bautista and other musicians. Senate President Juan Ponce Enrile then read the proclamation of the election results. Vice President-elect Jejomar Binay was then sworn in a few minutes prior to Aquino to secure the line of succession. At 11:50 PST, Associate Justice Carpio-Morales administered the Oath of Office to Aquino. He then delivered his inaugural address as the 15th president of the Philippines. Later on, the assembled crowds were led in the recitation of the "Panata sa Pagbabago" (Oath for Change).

Eighty-one countries and foreign organisations sent 101 delegates to attend the ceremony, among them East Timorese President Jose Ramos-Horta and Tokyo Governor Shintaro Ishihara, both personal friends of the Aquino Family.

=== Post-ceremony events ===
A luncheon featuring the new president's favourite Japanese dishes was held at the Kalayaan Hall at the Malacañan Palace followed by a mass oath-taking of local officials and the new cabinet members. Later on, the cabinet was called for its first meeting, followed by a street party at the Quezon Memorial Circle in Quezon City later that night. Aquino sang two songs in a surprise musical number during the program.

== International guests at the Inauguration ==
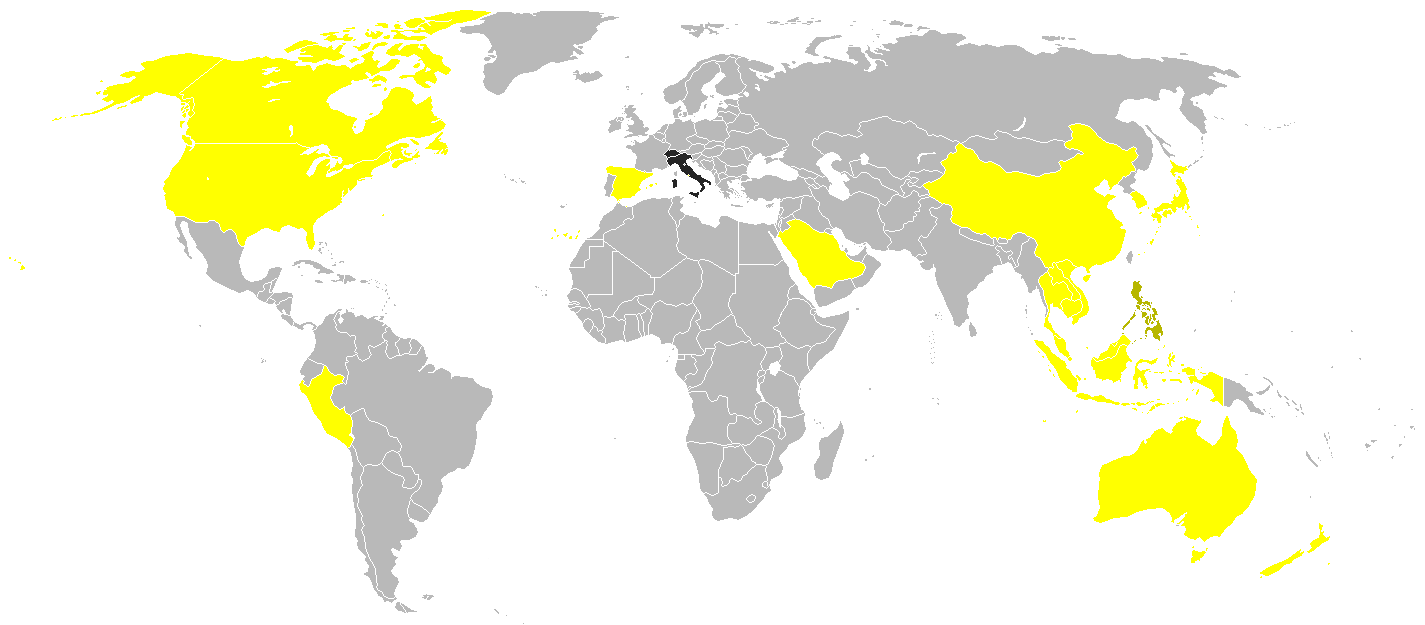
Countries in yellow attended by the head of state/government and colored in black attended by international organizations.

One-hundred one dignitaries of eighty-one countries and organizations attended the inauguration. Twenty-one states sent high-level delegations, who comprised heads of states and/or heads of governments, and/or foreign ministers of the countries being represented.

=== Heads of State ===
- (Timor-Leste) Jose Ramos-Horta, President of Timor Leste

=== Other Representatives ===
- (Australia) Julie Owens, Member of the Australian House of Representatives
- Pehin Lim Jock Seng, Second Minister of Foreign Affairs and Trade of Brunei
- Khieuk Kanharith, Minister of Information of Cambodia
- (Canada) Jim Abbott, Member of the Canadian Parliament
- Yan Junqi, Vice-Chairwoman of the National People’s Congress of China
- H.R. Agung Laksono, Coordinating Minister for People’s Welfare of Indonesia
- (Japan) Osamu Fujimura, Chief Cabinet Secretary
- (Japan) Shintaro Ishihara, Governor of Tokyo
- Souban Srithirath, Chief of Cabinet to the President of Laos
- Dato' Sri Shahrizat Abdul Jalil, Minister for Women, Family and Community Development of Malaysia
- John Hayes, Member of the New Zealand Parliament
- Jorge Castañeda Martínez, Ambassador of Peru to Indonesia
- Dr. Nizar bin Abaid Madani, Minister of State of the Foreign Affairs of Saudi Arabia
- George Yong-Boon Yeo, Minister for Foreign Affairs of Singapore
- Kim Hwang-sik, Chairman of the Board of Audit and Inspection of South Korea
- Enrique Múgica, Ombudsman of Spain
- José Eugenio Salarich, Director General for Foreign Policy for Asia and the Pacific at the Ministry of Foreign Affairs and Cooperation of Spain
- Ongart Klampaiboon, Minister for Office of the Prime Minister of Thailand
- Ron Kirk, Trade Representative of the United States
- (Vatican City) Most Rev. Osvaldo Padilla, Titular Archbishop of Pia and Apostolic Nuncio to Korea of the Holy See
- Vu Huy Hoang, Minister of Industry and Trade of Vietnam
- Jacqueline Babcock, Resident Coordinator of the United Nations
- Kazuyuki Tsurumi and Jean-Daniel Tauxe of the Food and Agriculture Organization
- Linda Wirth of the International Labour Organization
- Dennis Bothman of the International Monetary Fund
- Duc Tran of the International Organization for Migration
- Vanessa Tobin of the United Nations Children's Fund (represented by Colin Davis)
- Renaud Mayer of the UN Development Programme
- Rico Salcedo of the UN High Commission for Refugees
- Stephen Anderson of the UN World Food Programme
- Dr. Linda Milan of the World Health Organization
- Samir Diab, Assistant Secretary-General of the Organisation of Islamic Cooperation
- Bert Hoffman of the World Bank

== Gallery ==
Oath taking

Inaugural address
