= Manguerra =

Manguerra (mang-guerra) is the Hispanised version of the Mangubat surname from the combinations of the Filipino word "Mang" (i.e. to or to do) and the Spanish word "Guerra" (war). Manguerra therefore means "to wage war". Notable people with the surname include:

- Cecilia Manguerra Brainard (born 1947), Filipino author
- Catherine Manguerra Camilon (1997–disappeared 2023), Filipino model and abduction victim
