= Arturo Macapagal =

Filipino sport shooter (1942–2015)

Personal information
- Nickname: Art
- Born: Arturo de la Rosa Macapagal; 14 September 1942
- Died: 11 August 2015 (aged 72) Makati, Philippines
- Education: San Beda College; Asian Institute of Management
- Occupations: Shooter; businessman; sports official
- Spouse: Maria Therese Jalandoni

Sport
- Country: Philippines
- Sport: Shooting
- Event: Free pistol
- Updated on 12 August 2015

Arturo de la Rosa Macapagal (14 September 1942 – 11 August 2015) was the son of Philippine President Diosdado Macapagal. He was a Filipino shooter who competed at the 1972 and 1976 Summer Olympics at the free pistol event.

== Early life ==
Macapagal was the son of President Diosdado Macapagal and Purita de la Rosa, sister of Rogelio and Jaime. Purita was Diosdado Macapagal's first wife. Arturo was the second child and eldest son among the Macapagal family. Cielo was his elder sister. His mother died when he was just 1 year old and his father married Evangelina Macaraeg when he was five years old. His father had two children with Evangeline, Gloria Macapagal Arroyo and Diosdado Macapagal Jr.

== Education ==
Macapagal entered San Beda College for a bachelor's degree in business management and graduated from the institution as a cum laude in 1968. During his last year at San Beda, he was president of the student council. He later entered the Asian Institute of Management (AIM) and attained his master's degree in business management in 1971 from the institution. He became the first president of AIM's student association and the first chairman of its alumni association.

== Sporting career ==
=== As a shooter ===
Macapagal represented the Philippines in shooting on several competitions including at the 1972 and 1976 Summer Olympics where he participated at the free pistol event. During his 1972 Olympic stint he established a national record for free pistol, a record which would not be broken for 21 years, the longest in the country's shooting history. He was chosen as the "Most Outstanding Shooter of the Decade" by the Philippine Olympic Committee in 1980. In 1973 and 1974, he was named the All-around Filipino Sports Awardee by the Philippine Sportswriters Association.

=== As an official ===
Macapagal also led the Philippine National Shooting Association for many years and also served the Philippine Olympians Association as president. In 2008 he ran for the position of president at the Philippine Olympic Committee, challenging incumbent Jose Cojuangco who has been President of the Association since 2004 and was seeking a second term. Macapagal lost to Cojuangco by 2 votes with Macapagal receiving 19 votes and Cojuangco receiving 21 out of 40 votes cast. Cojuangco managed to win a third term in 2012.

== Business career ==
Macapagal became the president and CEO of Toyota Pasong Tamo, one of Toyota's largest dealers and also became the chair of Majal Properties Inc. and Melandrex Holdings Inc. He was also an active member of several business organizations such as the Financial Executives Institute and the Management Association of the Philippines.

He was also given awards by the alumni association of his former colleges. In 1979, the AIM Alumni Association gave Macapagal the triple-award for Outstanding Achievements in Management and in 1995 he was given the Centennial Award for Outstanding Achievement in Business and Management by the San Beda Alumni Association, on the occasion of the Centennial of the Benedictine Monks in the Philippines.

== Politics ==
Macapagal received many offers to enter politics. In 1971, Governor Jose Lingad asked for Macapagal to run as governor of Pampanga, in 1987; by Governor Bren Guiao to run a congressman and in 1992 as Guiao's vice governor. He declined to enter politics.

== Social involvement ==
In 1963, Macapagal and some of his friends established the Scholarship Foundation of the Filipino Youth and served as its chairman. The scholarship foundation grants college scholarship to high school students with financial difficulties that it deems as talented. He is also a trustee of the St. Anthony College of Technology in Mabalacat, Pampanga and a member of Habitat Philippines, with the later being an organization that provides housing for the poor.

== Personal life ==
Macapagal was married to Maria Therese Jalandoni who came from Iloilo, with whom he had three children.

== Death ==
Macapagal died on 11 August 2015 at age 72. He was hospitalized at the Makati Medical Center for prostate cancer.
