= Gobernador =

Coordinates: 37°29′N 3°19′W

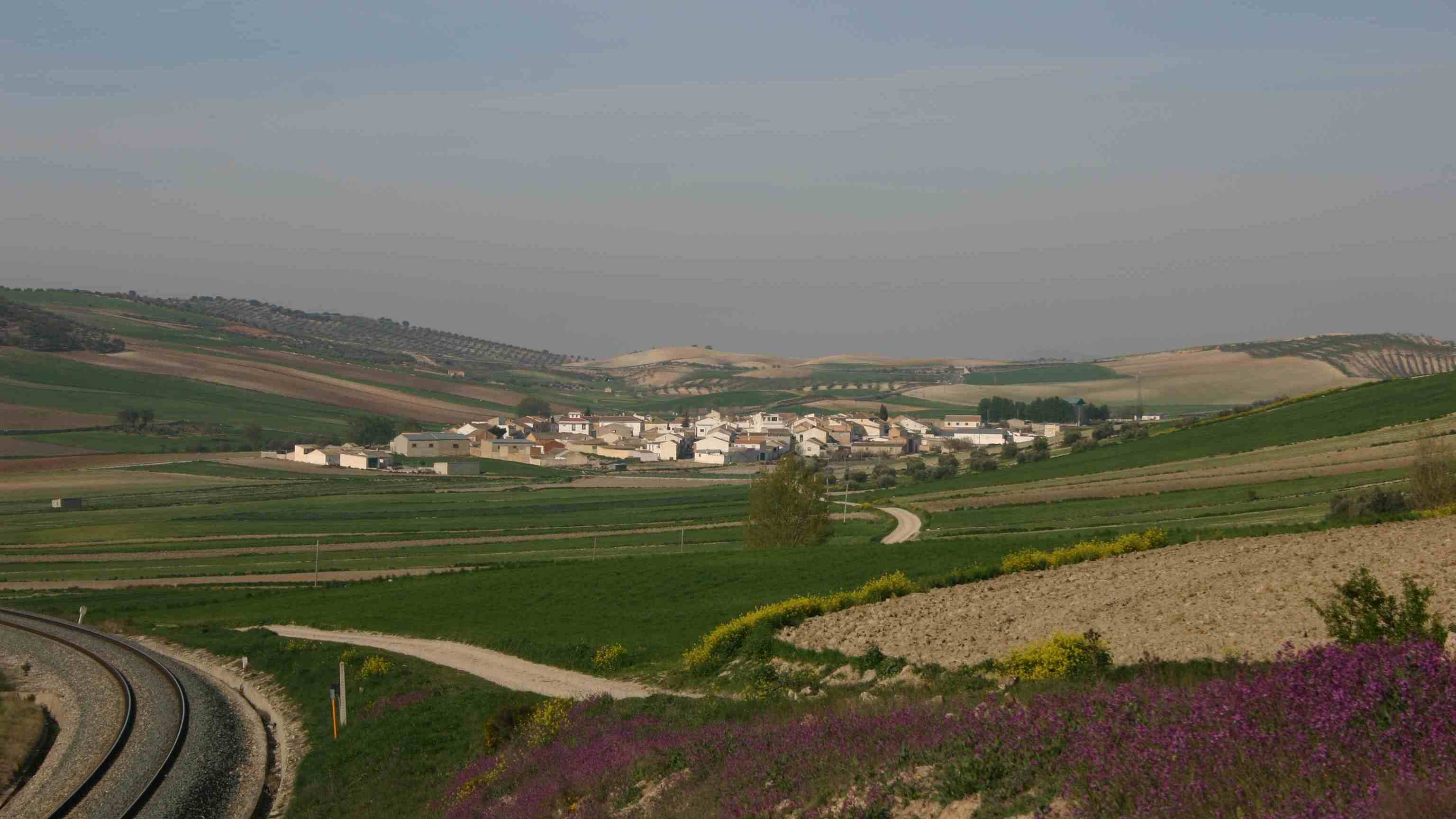
- View of Gobernador

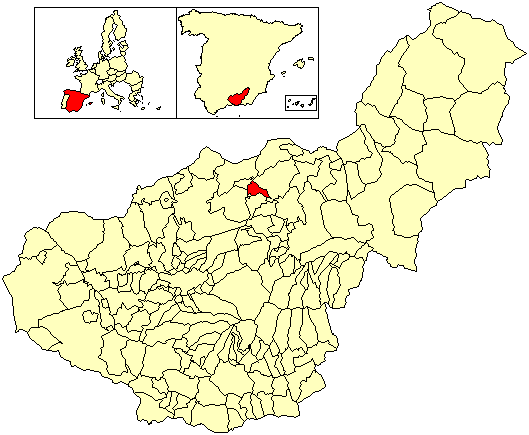

- Location in Spain.
- Country: Spain
- Autonomous community: Andalusia
- Province: Córdoba

Area
  - Total: 23.0 km^{2} (8.9 sq mi)
- Elevation: 1,040 m (3,410 ft)

Population (2025-01-01)
  - Total: 231
  - Density: 10.0/km^{2} (26.0/sq mi)
- Time zone: UTC+1 (CET)
  - Summer (DST): UTC+2 (CEST)

Gobernador is a municipality in the province of Granada, Spain. As of 2010, it has a population of 286 inhabitants.

== See also ==
- List of municipalities in Granada
