= Bahay Pangulo =

Residential building in Manila, Philippines

- Interactive map of the Bahay Pangulo area
- Former names: Bahay Pangarap; Bahay ng Pagbabago; Malacañang Park Rest House

General information
- Architectural style: Contemporary (current structure)
- Location: Malacañang Park, Manila, Philippines
- Coordinates: 14°35′34.4″N 120°59′44.9″E
- Current tenants: Bongbong Marcos, President of the Philippines and the First Family
- Completed: 1930s
- Renovated: 2008, 2024

Design and construction
- Architect: Juan Arellano

Renovating team
- Architect: Conrad Onglao

The Bahay Pangulo ("President's House"), formerly known as the Bahay Pangarap ("Dream House") and Bahay ng Pagbabago ("House of Change"), is a residential building inside the Malacañang Palace complex in Paco, Manila, Philippines. It has been used as the official residence of current president Bongbong Marcos, as well as former presidents Benigno Aquino III and Rodrigo Duterte during their presidencies, instead of taking residence at Malacañang proper as done by their predecessors.

== History ==
=== Original house (1930s–2008) ===
The Bahay Pangulo's original structure was built in the 1930s by the Bureau of Public Works and was designed by architect Juan Arellano and Antonio M. Toledo. It was originally built as a rest house of the Malacañang Park for informal activities and social functions of the president. The Malacañang Park itself was converted from a rice field south of the Malacañang Palace during the administration of President Manuel L. Quezon.

The rest house underwent refurbishment in the early 1960s initiated by First Lady Eva Macapagal, wife of President Diosdado Macapagal. Macapagal gave the name "Bahay Pangarap" to the rest house.

During the administration of President Fidel V. Ramos, the house was repurposed as a clubhouse for the Malacañang Golf Club. In 1996, it was made as an alternative venue for official government functions, in addition to social and recreational events.

=== Onglao house (2008–) ===
The Bahay Pangarap (Dream House) underwent renovation in 2008 under architect Conrad Onglao, wherein the original structure was essentially demolished and rebuilt in a contemporary style. Its roof has a basic design which was adopted from the previous structure. Likewise, the Commonwealth-era swimming pool was also demolished and rebuilt in a modern style, with heating included.

President Benigno Aquino III took residence in the Bahay Pangarap during his tenure from 2010 to 2016. He preferred to live in his private house in Times Street in Quezon City and refused to take residence at the Malacañang Palace or the nearby Arlegui mansion because the buildings are "too big" for a bachelor like him. He made a compromise, taking residence in Bahay Pangarap, where the presidential guards could better guarantee his safety. Aquino is the first president to make the Bahay Pangarap his official residence.

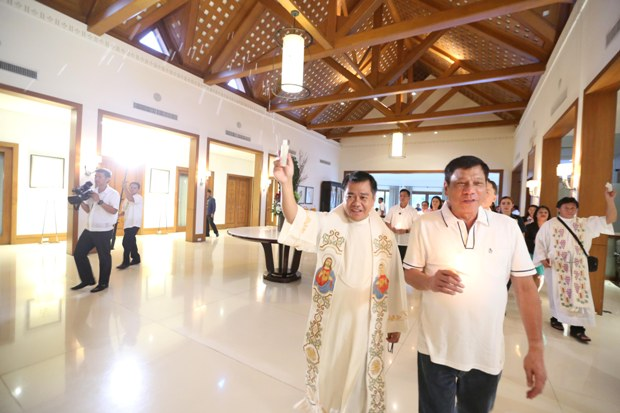
Duterte and Monsignor Paul Cuizon during the blessing of the house in July 2016

After President Rodrigo Duterte took office in 2016, he moved into the Bahay Pangarap, which was renamed as "Bahay ng Pagbabago" (lit. 'House of Change'). The name change was a bid of the Duterte administration to distance itself from the "pipe dream" of its immediate predecessor.

The house became the official residence of current President Bongbong Marcos and his family since June 30, 2022. The building underwent additional renovations due to severe damage from termites and the 2022 Luzon earthquake and was renamed Bahay Pangulo (President's House).

== Facilities ==
The house is located at Malacañang Park beside the compound of the Presidential Security Command, which situated on the opposite side of the Pasig River fronting Malacañang Palace itself. Prior to 2010, it only had a single bedroom and a swimming pool. Three additional rooms were added when President Benigno Aquino III made the house his official residence; a guest room, a room each for the president's household staff and close-in security aides. Following renovations during the Bongbong Marcos administration, several paintings of Fernando Amorsolo were transferred to the residence from Malacañang.
