= De la Serna family =

Political and civic family in Lapu-Lapu City, Cebu, Philippines

The de la Serna family is a Filipino family of Spanish-mestizo origin historically associated with Opon (now Lapu-Lapu City), Cebu, on Mactan Island. Members of the family held local government positions during the late Spanish colonial period and the American period, and several descendants later became involved in provincial and national public life in the Philippines.

== History ==
=== Early history and Spanish colonial period ===
The family’s political journey began with members of the de la Serna family who intermarried with the established Mangubat lineage in the 19th century. The Mangubat family is documented in both historical and genealogical sources as an old Visayan lineage associated with Mactan Island, with recorded members forming part of the principalia class (maestre de campo, cabeza de barangay, municipal officials, and judges of peace) during the Spanish colonial era.

The de la Serna family's documented history in Opon, now Lapu-Lapu City, dates to the late 18th century. Juan Feliz de la Serna (c. 1769–1847), identified in a 1796 marriage record from Opon as a mestizo español, is the earliest documented member of the family in the town. His son, Liberato de la Serna, and grandson, Rito de la Serna, belonged to subsequent generations of the family in Opon. Both Liberato and Rito married into the Mangubat family, further connecting the two lineages.

The family subsequently became involved in the civic and political affairs of Opon. Members of the de la Serna and Mangubat families were part of the local principalia during the late Spanish colonial period and held positions of local authority. According to Gerry Yaun Desabelle, families belonging to the Spanish-era principalia and affluent local families continued to provide many of Opon's political leaders during the American regime. These families often had members who had previously held positions such as cabezas de barangay, directorcillos, gobernadorcillos, and juez de paz.

== American period ==
=== Early American period ===
Following the establishment of American administration in Cebu, Opon's municipal government was reorganized under the new colonial system. In 1907, Opon held its first municipal election, in which Pascual de la Serna was elected municipal president. He is described in local historical accounts as the first elected municipal president of Opon under the American administration. According to Desabelle, when Pascual de la Serna was elected to office in 1907, he pledged to govern according to principles of fairness, justice, and equality. During his administration, he promoted the planting of maguey throughout the island, encouraged the establishment of a maguey-processing factory, negotiated the acquisition of the town plaza from church property, and constructed a town hall with a loan from the provincial government. He also ordered improvements to the plaza. During his tenure, Standard Vacuum Oil Company and Caltex Philippines became involved in the oil business in Opon.

Pascual's election marked the continuation of the de la Serna family's involvement in the local government of Opon during the American period. Members of the family subsequently held other municipal offices and continued to participate in the civic and political affairs of the community. Among them was Bartolome Mangubat Dimataga, the husband of Leoncia de la Serna (sister of Pascual), served as municipal president from 1911 to 1918. He was succeeded by Agustín de la Serna Tumulac, a member of the Tumulac branch of the family, who served from 1919 to 1922. Bartolome then returned to the municipal presidency, serving again from 1923 to 1928.

=== Municipal leadership in the late 1920s to early 1930s ===
The family's involvement in local government continued through subsequent generations. The succession continued with Rito Dimataga de la Serna, who served as municipal mayor from 1929 to 1933. During his administration, the Opon Municipal Council appropriated funds for the construction of the Lapulapu Monument, which was completed in 1933. According to Desabelle, Rito died not long after the monument's completion, giving rise to a local belief that the statue was associated with the deaths of Opon's chief executives. He was succeeded by his cousin, Gregorio Ycong de la Serna, who served as municipal mayor from 1933 to 1936 and died in office on October 7, 1936. The deaths of Rito, Gregorio, and subsequent chief executives contributed to the development of the local legend surrounding the Lapulapu monument.

=== Commonwealth and early postwar period ===
The political prominence of the de la Serna family continued with Mariano de la Serna Dimataga, son of Bartolome Dimataga and Leoncia de la Serna, and cousin of the late Rito Dimataga de la Serna and Gregorio de la Serna. According to Desabelle, Mariano began his political career in 1937, when he ran for municipal mayor of Opon. His election came after a succession of deaths among the town's chief executives, including Rito de la Serna, Gregorio de la Serna, and Simeon Amodia, whose deaths had contributed to a local belief that the Lapulapu monument erected in 1933 was associated with a so-called death jinx. Upon assuming office in 1938, Dimataga ordered the monument's renovation, replacing its original bow and arrow with the pestle it carries today. He subsequently remained in local government for approximately three decades, first as municipal mayor of Opon and later as mayor of Lapu-Lapu City, and became one of the most influential figures in the city's political and civic development.

Dimataga was credited with laying the groundwork for Opon's transformation from a small town into a growing urban center. His long tenure was marked by efforts to support Opon's transition to city status and to promote its subsequent development. He worked to prepare Opon for cityhood and, following its conversion into a city, continued to promote its development through local administration and public works. He served as municipal mayor from 1938 to 1942 and again from 1945 to 1961, before becoming the first mayor of the newly incorporated City of Lapu-Lapu, serving from 1962 to 1967. Although his tenure was interrupted because of World War II, his involvement in local government spanned nearly three decades, making him one of the longest-serving political figures in Opon and Lapu-Lapu's history

== Relationship with the Mangubat family ==
The de la Serna family's history in Opon is closely intertwined with that of the Mangubat family, one of the prominent families of Mactan. Members of the Mangubat lineage held positions of local authority and social prominence in the area for several generations. Among the earlier documented figures was Don Francisco Adlauan Mangubat, who was identified as a Maestre de Campo in Mactan during the late 17th and early 18th centuries. His son, Don Lazarino Mangubat, and later his grandson, Don Lorenzo Mangubat, continued the family's prominence in local affairs, reflecting the family's longstanding position among the local principalia.

Both the de la Serna and Mangubat lineages were connected to this Mangubat ancestry. Rito de la Serna's mother, Simona Leocadia Mangubat, was a great-granddaughter of Francisco Adlauan Mangubat, while Rito's wife, Tomasa Mangubat, was also descended from the same lineage. Their marriage therefore united two branches of a Mangubat-descended family network that had maintained prominence in Mactan and Opon for generations.

== Notable Members ==
- Pascual de la Serna- (born 1866), son of Rito de la Serna and Tomasa Mangubat. He was the last Juez de Paz in Opon, revolutionary president (1902), and the first town president during the American period (1907–1910).
- Candido de la Serna- (1879–1957), son of Rito de la Serna and Tomasa Mangubat, served as Opon's counselor (1910–1916) and vice mayor (1919).
- Leonila de la Serna Dimataga- First Lady of the Philippines (1957–1961), wife of the Philippines' 8th President, Carlos P. Garcia.
- Rito Dimataga de la Serna- (1898–1933), grandson of Rito de la Serna and Tomasa Mangubat, was Opon's municipal mayor from 1929-1933.
- Gregorio de la Serna- (1890–1936), son of Pascual de la Serna, was Opon's municipal mayor from 1933 to 1936.
- Mariano de la Serna Dimataga- (1902–1971), son of Bartolome Dimataga and Leoncia de la Serna. He was the Mayor of Lapu-Lapu City during different periods between 1938–42, 1945–61, and 1962–67.
- Manuel Hamabar de la Serna- (1902–1971), son of Candido de la Serna. He served as Provincial Treasurer of Cebu and Agusan del Norte (1965–1971) and city treasurer and city assessor of Dansalan City (1955).
- Vicente de la Serna- (September 13, 1951 – September 1, 2018), grandson of Candido de la Serna, was a Filipino lawyer, politician, and legislator. He was the mayor of Mandaue (1986), Cebu's 6th district's representative to the 8th Congress of the Philippines (1987–1992) and the governor of the province of Cebu, Philippines from 1992 until 1995. He later served as the deputy executive secretary during Philippine President Joseph Estrada’s administration.
- Fausto de la Serna- (1931–1991), grandson of Candido de la Serna. He was a lawyer, city auditor of Lapu-Lapu, and later the Commission on Audit Region XI Regional Director.
- Agnes Magpale- (born Agnes Dimataga Almendras on January 21, 1942), granddaughter of Leoncia de la Serna, is Filipina educator, farmer, and retired politician who previously served as Acting Governor (2012–2013), Vice Governor (2011–2019), and Board Member (1992–2001; 2004–2011) of the Province of Cebu.
- Arturo Ompad Radaza – politician and former mayor of Lapu-Lapu City, serving from 2001 to 2010, and later representative of the city's lone congressional district. Radaza is a descendant of the de la Serna family through his mother, Sindulfa de la Serna Ompad.
- Victor de la Serna Tumulac (1857–1914) – municipal official of Medellin, Cebu, Cebu. He was the great-grandson of Juan Feliz de la Serna.
- Agustín de la Serna Tumulac (1859–1951) – a member of the Tumulac de la Serna branch of the family. He was the great-grandson of Juan Feliz de la Serna. He served as municipal president of Opon from 1919 to 1922 during the American period.

=== Related figures ===
- Bartolome Mangubat Dimataga- husband of Leoncia de la Serna and father of the Philippine First Lady, Leonila de la Serna Dimataga. He served as Opon's Abogado de Justicia and presidente (1911–1918; 1923–1928).
- Ernest H. Weigel Jr. – mayor of Lapu-Lapu City from 1992 to 2001. Weigel was connected to the de la Serna family through marriage; his wife was related to Leonila de la Serna Dimataga Garcia and the Dimataga–de la Serna family.
- Inocencio B. Pareja – Secretary of the House of Representatives of the Philippines from 1958 to 1972. He was the biological father of Fausto de la Serna, who later served as City Auditor of Lapu-Lapu City. Pareja was the son of Aurelio Pareja, who served as a juez de paz (justice of the peace) in Opon.

== Legacy ==
The legacy of the de la Serna and related Mangubat families remains visible in the historic center of Lapu-Lapu City, particularly in Poblacion, the former town center of Opon. Several streets bear the names of members of the families who were involved in the civic and political history of the town.

R. de la Serna Street and G. Y. de la Serna Street commemorate members of the de la Serna family, including Rito de la Serna and Gregorio Ycong de la Serna, who served as municipal mayors of Opon during the American colonial period.

C. Mangubat Street preserves the name of the related Mangubat family. The street is associated with Cleto Mangubat, who served as a cabeza of Opon in the mid-19th century. Cleto was the father of Tomasa Mangubat, who married Rito de la Serna, further linking the Mangubat and de la Serna families.

A de la Serna ancestral house, believed to date to the 19th century, is also located along C. Mangubat Street, reflecting the family's longstanding presence in the historic town center.
