= Leonila Garcia =

First Lady of the Philippines from 1957 to 1961

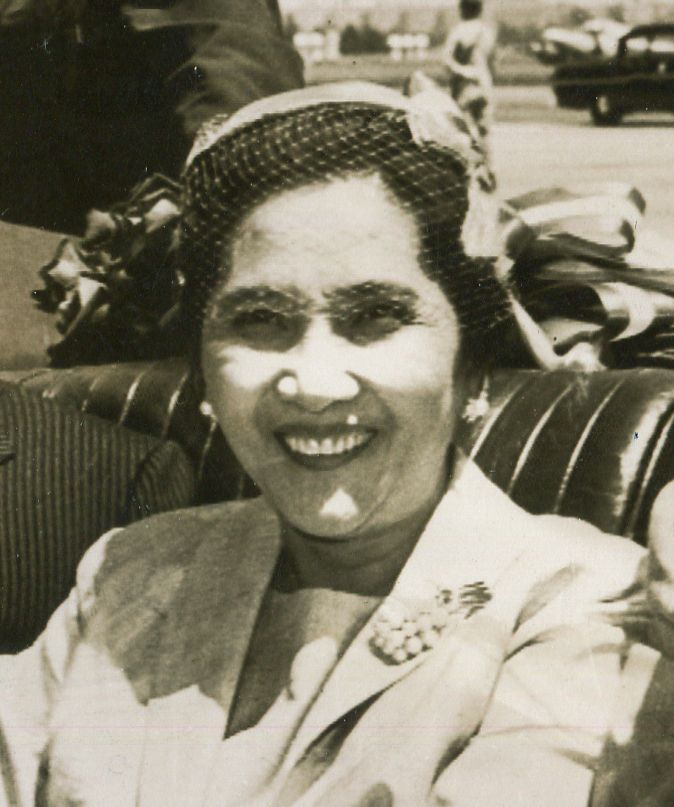

First Lady of the Philippines
- In role March 18, 1957 – December 30, 1961
- President: Carlos P. Garcia
- Preceded by: Luz Magsaysay
- Succeeded by: Eva Macapagal

Personal details
- Born: Leonila de la Serna Dimataga; July 17, 1906 Opon, Cebu, Philippine Islands
- Died: May 17, 1994 (aged 87) Quezon City, Philippines
- Resting place: Libingan ng mga Bayani, Taguig
- Party: Nacionalista
- Spouse: Carlos P. Garcia (m. 1933; died 1971)
- Children: Linda Garcia-Campos
- Education: University of Santo Tomas
- Profession: Pharmacist

Leonila "Inday" de la Serna Dimataga-Garcia (July 17, 1906 – May 17, 1994) was a Filipina pharmacist who served as the First Lady of the Philippines. She was the wife of Philippine President Carlos P. Garcia. She assumed the title on March 18, 1957, upon the accession of her husband, who was then-Vice President, shortly after the death of President Ramon Magsaysay.

Garcia was born to a family of politicians. Her father, Bartolome Mangubat Dimataga, was a former mayor of Opon (now Lapu-Lapu City), Cebu, while her mother, Leoncia de la Serna, was a member of the de la Serna family and a sister of another former mayor. Leonila's brother Mariano became the first mayor of Opon following its cityhood and renaming. Another sibling, Rosita was the sister-in-law of Senator Alejandro Almendras. Nicknamed "Inday", Leonila was a pharmacist graduate of the University of Santo Tomas. She met her future husband Carlos while working at a drug store in Tagbilaran, Bohol, that he had frequented. They married on May 24, 1933, and had a daughter together, Linda Garcia-Campos.

As First Lady, Garcia became active in cultural and social activities in line with her husband's Filipino First Policy.

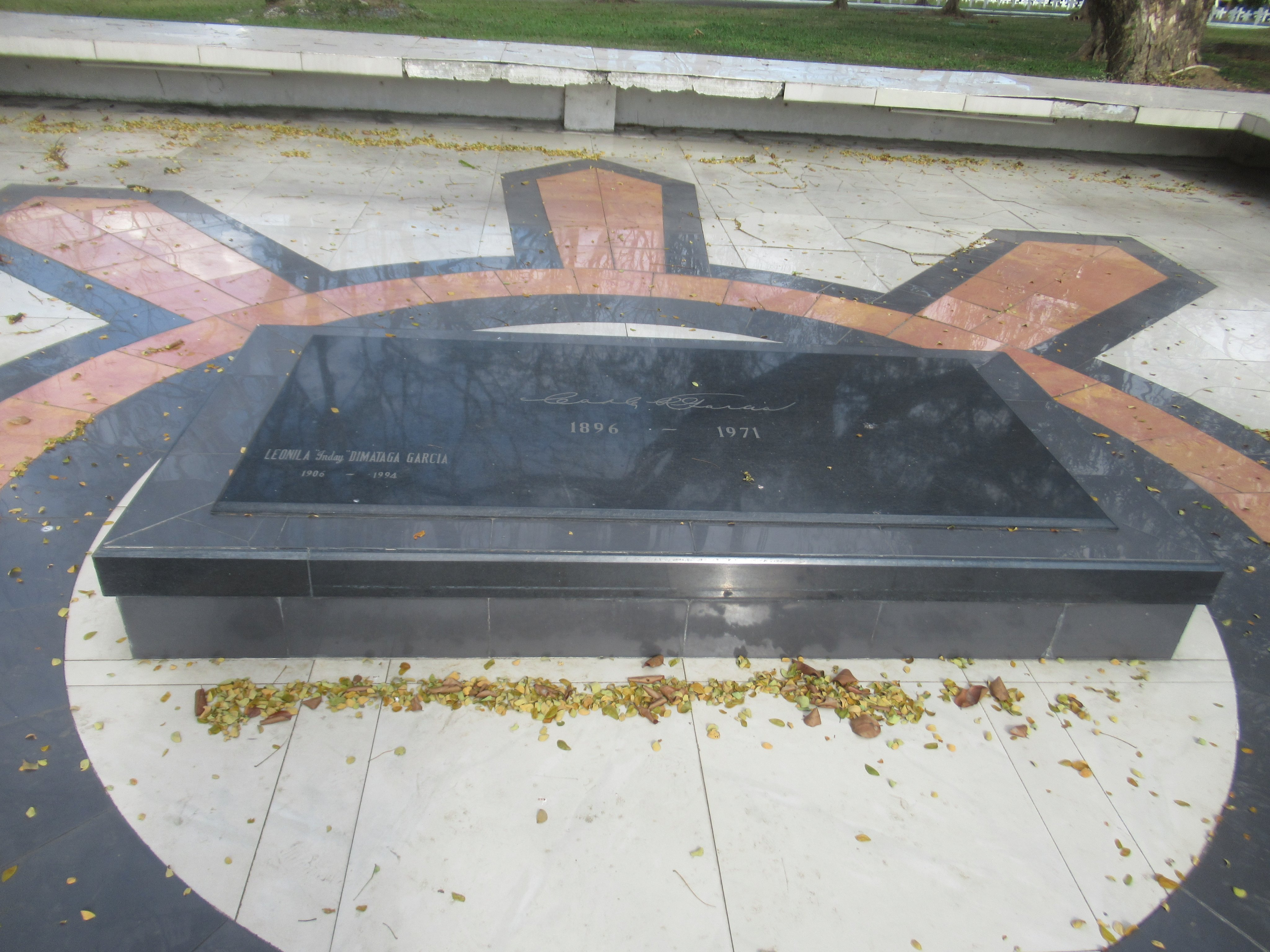
Grave of Carlos P. and Leonila Garcia at the Libingan ng mga Bayani

She ran for a Senate seat in 1971, but lost. She died in 1994.

Honorary titles
Preceded by Luz Magsaysay	First Lady of the Philippines; 1957–1961	Succeeded by Eva Macapagal
