= Eva Macapagal =

First Lady of the Philippines from 1961 to 1965

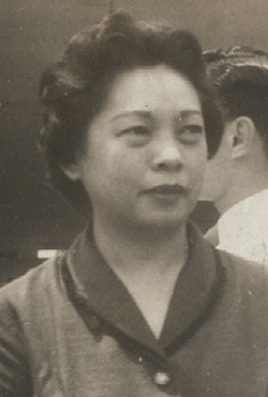
- Macapagal in 1960

First Lady of the Philippines
- In role December 30, 1961 – December 30, 1965
- President: Diosdado Macapagal
- Preceded by: Leonila Garcia
- Succeeded by: Imelda Marcos

Personal details
- Born: Evangelina de la Cruz Macaraeg; November 1, 1915 Binalonan, Pangasinan, Philippine Islands
- Died: May 16, 1999 (aged 83) Manila, Philippines
- Resting place: Libingan ng mga Bayani
- Spouse: Diosdado Macapagal (m. 1946; died 1997)
- Relations: Cielo Macapagal-Salgado (stepdaughter); Arturo Macapagal (stepson)
- Children: Gloria; Diosdado Jr.

Evangelina "Eva" Macaraeg Macapagal gcYC (Tagalog pronunciation: [makaɾaˈʔeɡ makapaˈɡal]; born Evangelina de la Cruz Macaraeg; November 1, 1915 – May 16, 1999) was the second wife of Diosdado Macapagal, the ninth President of the Philippines. She was the ninth First Lady of the Philippines, and the mother of the fourteenth President, Gloria Macapagal Arroyo.

== Biography ==
Eva Macapagal (born Evangelina de la Cruz Macaraeg) was born on November 1, 1915 in the town of Binalonan, Pangasinan to Juan Guico Macaraeg (a civil engineer) and Irinea de la Cruz.

Eva Macapagal completed her medical studies at the University of Santo Tomas and passed the medical board in 1938. He married Diosdado Macapagal in 1946. A physician by profession, she founded several health and education centers for the poor throughout the country such as the Elsie Gaches Village, a center for the underprivileged in the south of Manila, and financially supported the Medical Research Foundation of the Philippines. She campaigned for quality films and TV shows and promoted the use of the patadyóng kimona and the terno among women. In events in the Malacañang Palace, she sought to display simplicity, elegance, punctuality and cordiality.

Eva Macapagal was known for frequently wearing the national dress. She wore ternos as well as María Claras for formal occasions or state functions, but preferred to wear the patadyóng kimona for simplicity and ease of movement. She favored a handful of Filipino couturiers, including Pitoy Moreno, who adhered to her preferred style of simple but elegant lines.

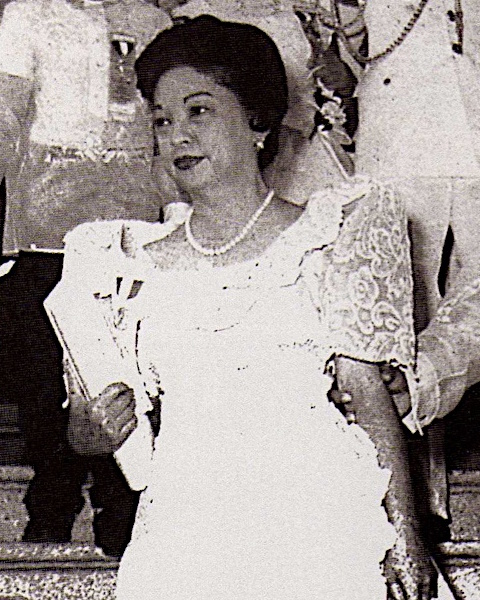
Macapagal in 1961, on the day of her husband's inauguration

Among Eva's projects as First Lady was the promotion of a Philippine-made and durable textile called the “Pag-asa cloth”, with an emphasis on its affordable price. Eva Macapagal and her daughter Gloria, then in her teens, sometimes wore dresses fashioned from the Pag-asa cloth.

Eva Macapagal's training as a physician influenced her to promote cleanliness and neatness in the rooms and appointments of the Malacañang Palace. Repairs, refurnishing, repainting, and redecoration were effected in the palace. She made inspection tours to supervise efficiency towards this aim. She tended the grounds of the palace and the executive building as a garden, planted new trees and flowering shrubs, and demolished old wooden structures, recommending that no new building be constructed in the Malacañang grounds to maintain the green spaces belonging to the palace complex.

Eva Macapagal discovered that the Palace had a wealth of fine woodwork made of high-quality Philippine hardwoods. She also discovered handsome pieces of furniture and decorations stacked in storerooms, offices and garages in the Palace complex, which she salvaged and refurbished. Long-forgotten heirloom pieces were cleaned and polished and displayed in the different rooms, halls, and walls of the palace. At the time, President Heinrich Lübke of West Germany once paid the palace a compliment when he said that having seen virtually all the palaces in the world, he believed that although not as large as other palaces, the Malacañang Palace was one of the best that could be found anywhere..

Macapagal died on May 16, 1999.

== Honors ==
- Spain:
  - Dame Grand Cross of the Order of Isabella the Catholic (30 June 1962)
- Taiwan:
  - Special Grand Cordon of the Order of Propitious Clouds (2 May 1960)
- Thailand:
  - Dame Grand Cross of the Order of Chula Chom Klao
- Germany:
  - Grand Cross Special Class of the Order of Merit of the Federal Republic of Germany (1963)

Honorary titles
Preceded by Leonila Garcia	First Lady of the Philippines; 1961–1965	Succeeded by Imelda Marcos
