= Political positions of Benigno Aquino III =

Political views of the former Philippine president

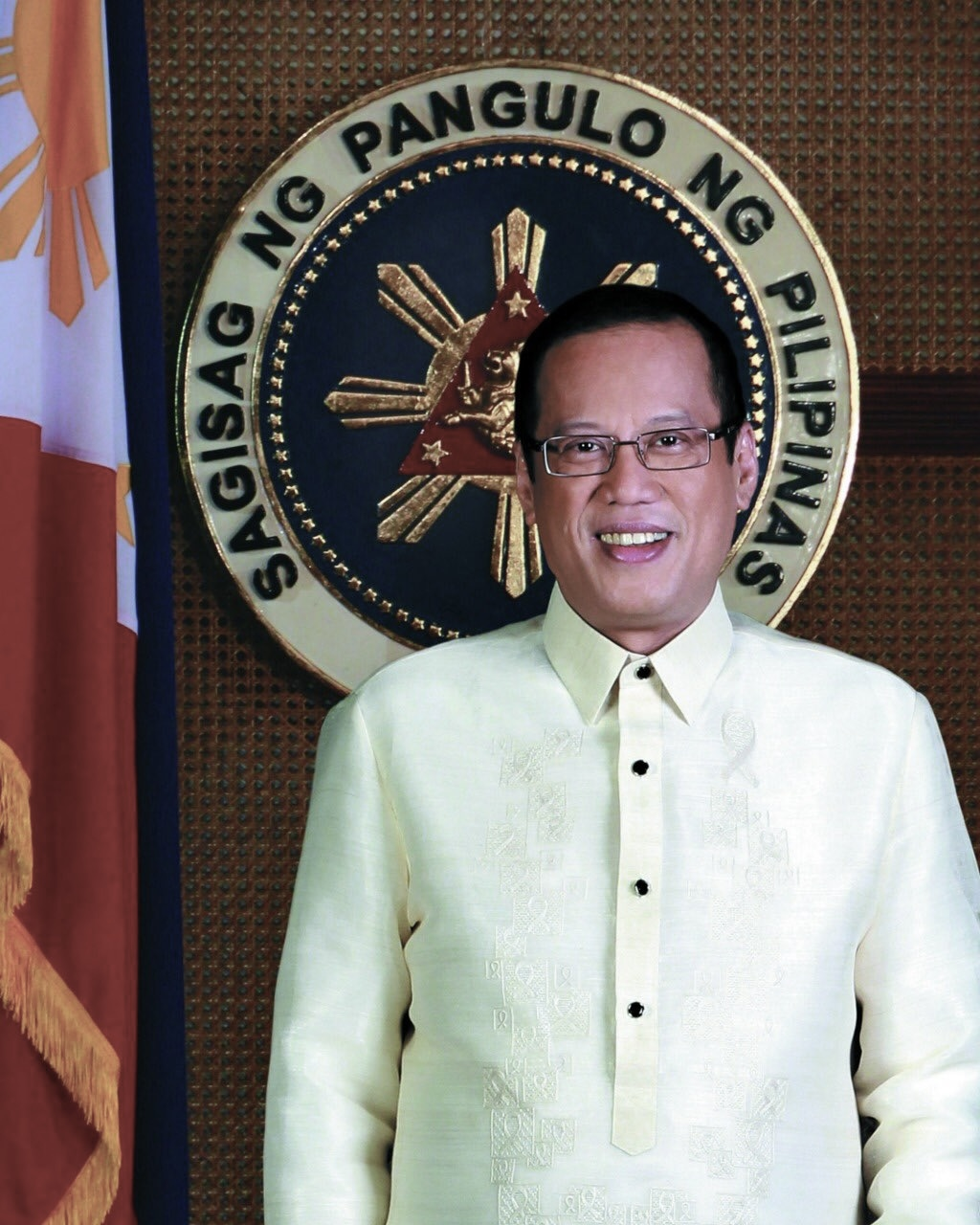
Aquino's official portrait in 2010

15th Philippine President Benigno Aquino III has made political position on many national issues.

== Energy policy ==
=== Nuclear energy ===
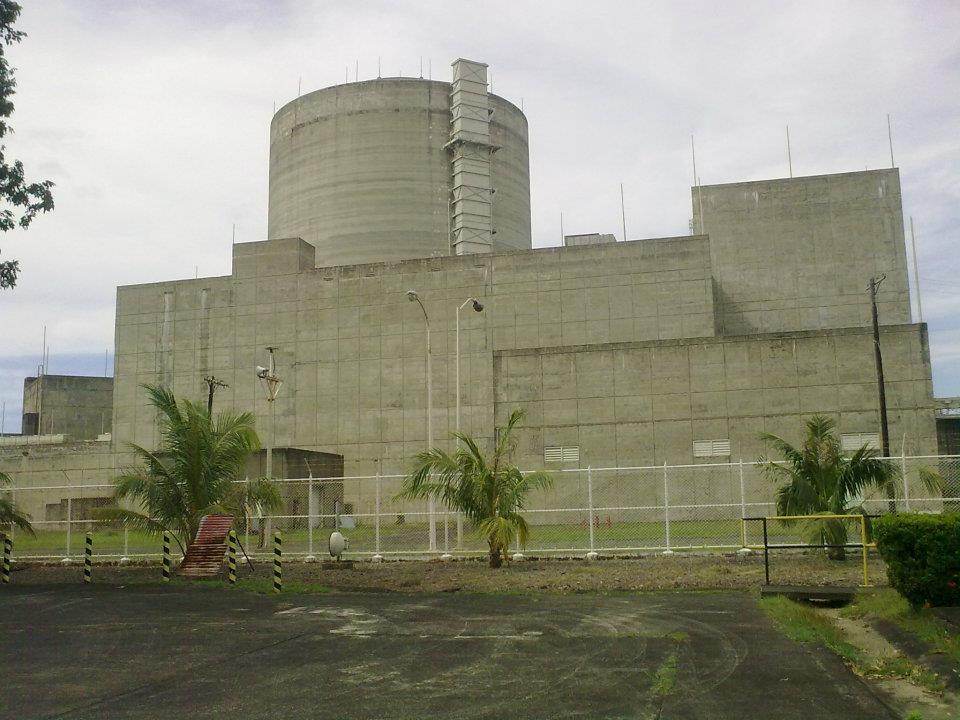
Benigno Aquino III is opposed to plans to restart the Bataan Nuclear Power Plant

Aquino is not keen on utilizing nuclear energy as a remedy to a power shortage Mindanao experienced in the second quarter of 2012. Aquino said that while he is open to adopt nuclear energy he is more inclined to tap "other sources of energy that have less impact – or potential negative impact – that are available to us. While Aquino remained open to nuclear energy he has publicly expressed his opposition to plans to revive the moth-balled Bataan Nuclear Power Plant.

== Environmental policy ==
During an interview in CNN in November 2013, Aquino said that countries "contributing immensely to the global warning" have a moral responsibility to contribute to end climate change.

== Financial policy ==
=== Priority Development Assistance Fund ===
Following the Priority Development Assistance Fund scam, Aquino initially insisted that the abolition of the Priority Development Assistance Fund or PDAF is unnecessary. Aquino later detracted from his earlier statement and vowed to abolish the fund and replace it with a new system.

== Social policy ==
=== Abortion and reproductive health ===
Despite his support for the Reproductive Health Bill, which was perceived by critics as a precedent to a law on legalizing abortion, Aquino insists that he is against the legalization of abortion.

Aquino supported the passing of the Reproductive Health Bill. He believes on the responsibility of the state to inform couples on their right to plan their family.

=== Foreign land ownership ===
Aquino is against revising the constitution to allow full land ownership by foreigners. Aquino remains firm in keeping the 60/40 foreign ownership law which guarantees Filipinos majority share on land ownership.

=== Gay marriage ===
Aquino has yet to make a firm stance on gay marriage. During a forum at the Sofitel Philippine Plaza in December 2013, Aquino was inquired on his view on gay marriage and if he was in favor of its legalization. Aquino initially refused to answer the question but later clarified his views on the issue. He said that while he believes on universal human rights he is undecided on the legalization of gay marriage. Aquino expressed some concerns that legalization of gay marriage may follow legalization of abortion. He said that the issue must first be viewed on a "child's perspective".He expressed concerns that children adopted by gay marriage couples may experience gender confusion.

== Security policy ==
=== Gun ownership ===
Aquino, a gun enthusiast himself, is against the imposition of a total gun ban in the country. He believes in the right to bear arms. On May 29, 2013, Aquino signed the Republic Act No. 10591, an "Act Providing for a Comprehensive Law on Firearms and Ammunition and Providing Penalties for Violations thereof", providing a new set of standards on obtaining a license to bear firearms.

=== Height restriction on security personnel ===
Aquino vetoed a bill that would have remove height restrictions on police, fire and jail personnel. Aquino found the bill unnecessary as a waiver can be given to applicants under certain conditions. Aquino insists that jail personnel in particular "must possess the necessary physical attributes to perform their functions effectively".

== Foreign policy ==
=== China ===
Aquino has made statements critical to China indirectly and directly. At the 2013 ASEAN summit in Brunei, He accused China of being uncooperative after it rejected to participate in a case filed by the Philippines to the United Nations tribunal. Aqunio also said that he is open of an idea of a joint development in the South China Sea but remained cautious and insisted that a joint development would be under Philippine law.

Aquino supports a diplomatic solution to the South China Sea dispute. He reiterated that ASEAN members should draft the Code of Conduct of Parties in the West Philippine Sea before commencing ASEAN-China talks.

=== Japan ===
Aquino supported a proposal to allow Japanese troops access to Philippine military bases along with another proposal to give American troops greater access to Philippine military installation. Aquino views these proposals as an avenue to build a credible alliance with Japan and the United States.

== See also ==
- Manila hostage crisis
- Noynoying
- 2016 Philippine presidential election
- 1972 Philippines Martial law under Ferdinand Marcos
- 1986 Philippines EDSA People Power Revolution
- Political positions of Leni Robredo
- Political positions of Mar Roxas
- Political positions of Rodrigo Duterte
