= Likhaan =

- Linangan ng Kababaihan
- Formation: 1995
- Founder: Dr. Junice Melgar; Dr. Sylvia Estrada-Claudio
- Purpose: Primary Health Care Services for Women, Women's Rights, Reproductive Health
- Location: Philippines

Likhaan is a non-government organization (NGO) engaged in providing direct health care services to women in marginalized communities. Dr. Junice Melgar is its director and one of its co-founders. These services also allow Likhaan an entry point to organizing grassroots women in health care advocacy. Likhaan is an acronym for Linangan ng Kababaihan. Likhaan, a Filipino phrase which means "A Place for the Honing or Development of Women". Reproductive Health and Rights is a major focus of Likhaan's programs, reflected in its clinical services, education work and advocacy. The organisation works for a humane and non-hierarchical health care system. They are also identified by the Catholic Bishops' Conference of the Philippines that is pushing for the legalization of Abortion in the Philippines. The group is also one of the supporters of the Reproductive Health Law and has stated that they will make the electoral campaign of politicians that voted against the bill difficult.

== Programs ==
=== Primary Health Care Services and Counselling for Women ===
Likhaan's approach to primary health care services is twofold. First is the community-based programs in low-income areas. of Apelo Cruz, Pasay; Letre, Malabon; Towerville, Bulacan; Paradise Village, Malabon; and the main clinic at the head office. Their programs, which integrates basic healthcare, community organizing and education, are led by community health workers.

Second is the mobile clinic “Tarajing”. Tarajing is a pink electric vehicle that brings medical team and medical supplies to poor communities.

Likhaan provides the following health care services:

- Pre-natal check ups and maternal care
- Family planning. They provide free birth control materials such as condoms in their clinics. The United Nations Population Fund provides them with these contraceptives.
- Abortion-related care. The organization aims to create safe zones where women can freely discuss issues about abortion.
- Care for survivors of VAW
- Counselling. Likhaan offers counseling services that are both nurturing and empowering to women. Counseling areas include violence against women (VAW) issues (i.e. rape/incest, domestic violence, sexual harassment, etc.), abortion-related issues, depression and other gender-related concerns.

=== Community Organizing and Education ===
Likhaan aims to organize women and help them fight for their rights. They also set up women's health associations each community to form the federation, Pinagsamang Lakas ng Kababaihan at Kabataan (PiLaKK). The group also provide education for gender issues such as domestic violence, sex education, and women's rights. Likhaan also conducts research studies directed at improving health care services and promoting women-sensitive health policies and programs.

Likhaan produces Information, Education and Communication (IEC) materials and activities in various forms of media are employed (usually in Filipino), such as print publications, forums, street plays, puppet shows, songs, and dance. One of the documentaries that they have released is Agaw-Buhay (Filipino for "Fighting for Life") which tackles the experiences of women that were subjected to unsafe abortion methods.

== See also ==
- Abortion in the Philippines
- High illegitimate birth rate and single mother phenomenon in Philippines
- Women in the Philippines
