= Alliance of Young Nurse Leaders and Advocates =

Professional organization in the Philippines

- Abbreviation: AYNLA
- Formation: September 2009
- Founded at: Manila, Philippines
- Registration no.: CN201009281
- Legal status: Active
- Purpose: Professional Association
- Headquarters: Villaruel Street Pasay, City
- Coordinates: 14.5523012°N 120.9919963°E
- National President & CEO: Atty. Reigner Jireh Antiquera
- Board of directors: Chairperson, Atty. Reigner Jireh Antiquera / Secretary-General, Jonathan Monis / Corporate Treasurer, Maria Kristina Siuagan / Corporate Auditor, Raymond Garcia / Trustees-At-Large, Mary Junillee Arano, Nikkon Fortunato, John Paul Patriarca, and Darren C. Cariño.
- Affiliations: WHO Global Health Workforce Alliance UN Department of Economic and Social Affairs (Profile)
- Website: www.aynla.org

The Alliance of Young Nurse Leaders and Advocates, also known as AYNLA, is a professional organization in the Philippines advocating for the achievement of the United Nations Millennium Development Goals (now Sustainable Development Goals), Universal Health Care, and advancement of nurses' rights and welfare. It was established in the year 2009 and registered with the Philippine Securities and Exchange Commission in 2010. The headquarters of the organization is currently located at Villaruel Street, in Pasay.

== History ==
Nine young professional nurses got together to establish AYNLA aiming to advance certain youth and health issues. AYNLA was conceived late August 2009 taking in a different name for its organizational test run. Moreover, it was launched in a different name and calling to serve as a springboard to the AYNLA it is now. The organization was formally conceptualized and was drafted in September 2009.

=== The birth of AYNLA ===
There were a lot of glitches and heated arguments creating the major stirring in the then organization until it reaches reorganization and eventually a lot of gray areas leaving many of its founding members left hanging in mid-air. Tensions arise and many discontented leaders just left the organization in inactivity. The then Board of Trustees was stirred by political issues and many issues left unanswered leading to the disbandment of the Board. The disbandment led a revolutionary turnabout leading to a new organization; the primary calling of AYNLA came in.

=== Call of leadership ===
Before the disbandment of the former Board, the then organization met with the Philippine Nurses Association – the motherboard of all nursing organizations in the Philippines. A question was raised on what is the specific nursing area of concern the organization was bearing. After the meeting, the then officers have decided to take Nursing Leadership & Management as the flagship program concept for the organization – the primary calling of AYNLA. By then all programs and services of the then organization were geared towards leadership.

=== Rise of AYNLA ===
After the stormy disbandment of the former Board and after the untimely resignation of all its Board members, the rise of AYNLA comes as fast as the disbandment of the former. Taking into the mandate of nursing leadership, management and now incorporating the concept of advocacy, the new organization took its new name and quickly reorganized itself to serve as a cushion to many of its wandering members of its status. The disbandment of the former Board now created two separate and totally different organizations, the former organization and AYNLA International. The new organization is composed majorly of the leaders of the former organization but was given the options to choose between the two. Similarly, in the local levels, members were asked to choose between having their membership active in the former or the latter; but was discouraged from becoming active members of both since there may be conflicting interests among its leaders.

=== Starting it right ===
After the former organization's period of difficulty, its leaders, now working under the name AYNLA, met to discuss the next steps for the new organization. One of the leaders held a series of consultative meetings with other leaders and trusted members to finalize plans to establish a national and international organization of young nurse leaders. A new board, called the Alliance Board, was formed and restructured the organization. The organization is now called the Alliance of Young Nurse Leaders and Advocates International.

=== AYNLA and the UN Millennium Development Goals Campaign ===
AYNLA unanimously agreed with the UN Millennium Development Campaign on the 8 Millennium Development Goals (MGDs). Leaders of AYNLA had seen the impact of rising HIV incidence rates, depressing maternal health, and increasing child mortality rates. AYNLA believed that because the MDGs are related to nursing and healthcare they should take serious actions to address these. A mandate from the stronghold leaders of AYNLA included the participation of the organization in every MDG and aligning all its programs and activities with achieving the MDGs through nursing leadership and advocacy.

=== AYNLA and the 2010 International Year of the Nurse ===
Another global calling that AYNLA was called to participate is the celebration of the 2010 International Year of the Nurse (IYN) – an international celebration of the centennial year of the Founder of Modern Nursing, the late Florence Nightingale, and the global nurses serving the world. The IYN is spearheaded by the Nightingale Initiative for Global Health (NIGH) and Sigma Theta Tau International (STTI), the international honorary society of nurses. IYN also advocates and pushes the UN MDGs in the global arena. AYNLA is fortunate to be recognized as a partner organization for the Philippines to hold this activity.

=== The road less traveled ===
AYNLA works to expland its national and international presence in the nursing sector while encouraging younger nurses to participate in professional advocacy and leadership development.

== The Alliance Seal ==
The AYNLA seal is the emblem used by the organization both domestic and international. The shield symbolizes strength and protection and assurance while the globe symbolizes the global competitiveness of each member in providing health care and it also symbolizes the reach of the services of the Alliance. The lamp symbolizes the nursing profession and the laurel leaves symbolize peace, advocacy, education and nobility. The Baybayin inscriptions, the ancient Filipino way of writing, "Pinuno" which means "Leader" in English.

== Partnerships and programs ==
=== Adolescent HIV nursing ===
AYNLA is currently implementing Adolescent HIV Nursing Model for Community-based Treatment, Care, and Support project in partnership with United Nations Children's Fund (UNICEF) and Department of Health. The project aims to provide adolescents living with HIV (ALHIV) a rigorous, comprehensive HIV treatment, care, and support through integrated medical and social care approaches to achieve better health outcomes. It specifically aims to pilot an HIV Nursing Model that caters to ALHIV needs through community-based approaches in two high burdened sites (Iloilo/Zamboanga), to develop and implement standardized non-discriminatory, youth-friendly, nursing module for treatment, care and support of ALHIV, and to generate evidence through documentation of knowledge product and experiences including lessons learned.

Further, a National Steering Committee was established to provide support in the successful implementation of the project and in meeting its objectives. It will serve as a governing body providing strategic leadership and governance oversight. It is expected to make key policy decisions relative to Adolescent HIV Nursing, guide the implementing partner in the execution of the project, and provide reviews on the results of the project evaluations that will take place periodically. More importantly, the NSC will help in ensuring the sustainability of the project that will provide quality and efficient HIV care, treatment, and support among adolescents. The members of the NSC include Department of Health, Department of Social Welfare and Development, Council for the Welfare of Children, National Youth Commission, and Regional DOH/DSWD Offices.

=== Kalusugan Pangkalahatan (Universal Health Care) ===
The organization partnered with the Department of Health (Philippines) (DOH) in conducting series of community town hall assemblies known as "Usapang KP" where the DOH can directly consult the people on their needs and problems concerning healthcare delivery in their community through AYNLA's nurses. Inputs of these assemblies were used for policy development and recommendation to the office of the DOH Secretary for the proper implementation of the Universal Health Care program in the Philippines.

AYNLA also worked with the DOH and Probe Media Foundation for the implementation of a primary health care roving bus called "Lakbay Buhay Kalusugan" touring 10 key areas in the country doing health promotion activities. It also partnered with DOH in the implementation of the national monitoring and evaluation activities for the RNHEALS project.

AYNLA also worked with PhilHealth ensuring the effectiveness of the implementation of its program, PhilHealth Cares. It was invited by the PhilHealth president to be part of the multi-specialty group called PhilHealth Watch that will help monitor PhilHealth's programs.

Lastly, AYNLA also worked with the International Labour Organization on Health and Migration issues.

=== Philippine reproductive health law ===
AYNLA is known to be publicly supportive of having a national comprehensive reproductive health law emphasizing the role of nurses as health educators, patient counselors, and consultants. It joined the Technical Panel of Experts which reviewed and finalized the draft of then Reproductive Health (RH) bill. Finally, AYNLA participated in developing the implementing rules and regulation of the said law.

=== UHC Global Coalition ===
AYNLA actively participated in advocacy efforts within the Universal Health Coverage (UHC) Coalition, led by Global Health Strategies on behalf of The Rockefeller Foundation, to raise awareness about the need to expand affordable and quality health services. AYNLA most recently demonstrated its commitment through hosting a successful event timed to Universal Health Coverage Day 2015.

== Accolades and recognitions ==
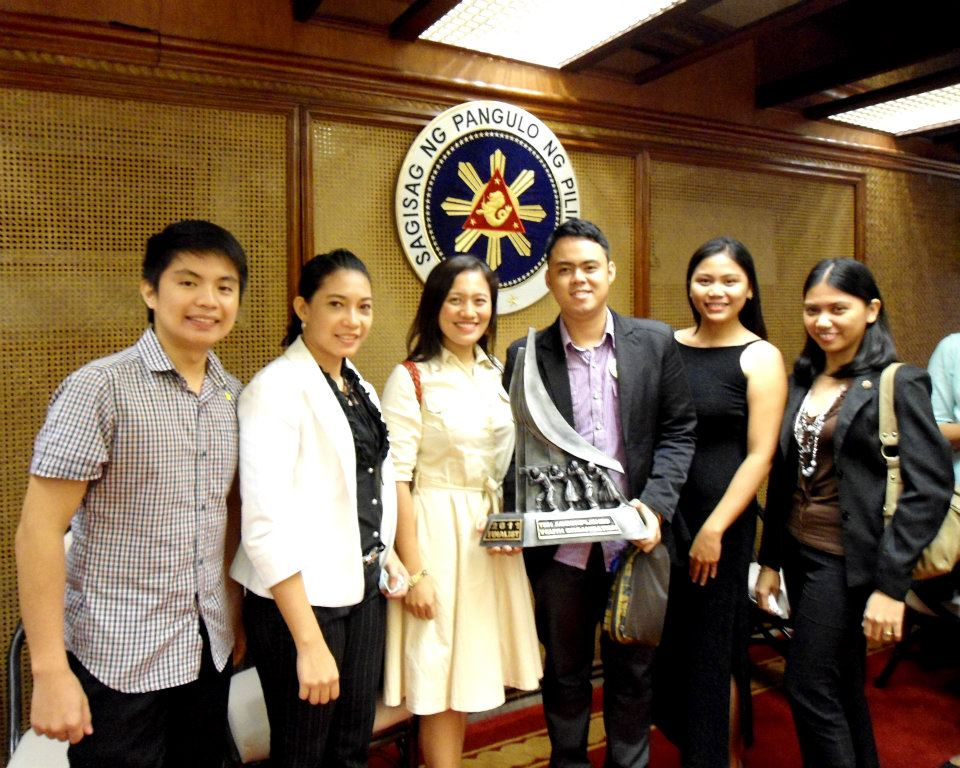
AYNLA nurses together with then Executive Vice-President Atty. Reigner Jireh Antiquera at Malacanan Palace during the 9th TAYO Awards.

- Ten Accomplished Youth Organization (TAYO) Awards

AYNLA's program Kalingang Bayan: The National Nursing Mission was selected as one of the National Finalists of the 9th TAYO Awards, organized by TAYO Foundation in partnership with the National Youth Commission. The said project focuses on providing essential health services to communities including health education and consultation, as well as providing training of health workers. Awarding ceremonies were held at the Malacañan Palace, Philippines.

- 6th United Nations Population Fund Country Programme

AYNLA contributed to the effective implementation of the 6th UNFPA Country Program of Assistance to the Government of the Philippines from 2005-2011, which supported national and local partners to prevent maternal deaths and achieve Millennium Development Goal 5.

- Healthy Lifestyle Exemplar Awards

A Plaque of Commendation was awarded to AYNLA by the Health and Lifestyle Magazine, under the category of Health Education and Public Service, for its program focusing on patient education and health promotion.

- Care Challenge Awards by Connecting Nurses

AYNLA's program known as pod.RN: The Nurses' Podcast Project was selected by the Connecting Nurses as one of the winners of the 2011 Care Challenge Awards, under the Helping Category. The program aim to deliver interactive online shows educating essential health concerns.
