= Noynoying =

Protest tactic

Noynoying (pronounced noy-noy-YING or noy-NOY-ying) is a protest tactic in the form of neologism which critics of Philippine President Benigno Aquino III have used to question the alleged work ethic or alleged inaction on Aquino's part on the issues of disaster response and of rising oil prices. A play on the term planking and Aquino's nickname, "Noynoy", Noynoying involves posing in a lazy manner, such as sitting idly while resting their heads on one hand and doing nothing. The term was created by his critics, notably the Makabayan bloc, from the far left, which was meant to create more support for the far left agenda. However, the disinformation campaign of the far left benefited the conservative far right instead, who also lashed out at the centric Aquino administration. The disinformation campaign by the far left later proved beneficial to the rise of presidents Rodrigo Duterte and Bongbong Marcos.

While the first documented use of the term dates back to October 2011, the term usage became more widely spread when protesters started using it as a protest gimmick in 2012, catching widespread attention from mainstream media and spreading virally on social media. The origins of Noynoying as a protest device have been strongly associated with the Re-affirmist faction of the Philippines' leftist movements, although its use has since spread to other groups generally critical of Aquino, regardless of affiliation.

In response, the Aquino administration expressed confidence that Noynoying would not catch on with the public.

When President Aquino died on June 24, 2021, outpouring of tributes and appreciation followed with people generally recognizing his incorruptibility, deep respect in the supremacy of the Constitution and the rule of law, and keenness to details prompting one prominent writer to review the term "Noynoying" focusing on Aquino's positive attributes and contributions.

Scholars and personalities have condemned the disinformation campaign which tarnished the active presidency of Noynoy Aquino. Some argue that Noynoying should fit the realities of the Aquino administration and not the disinformed narratives spouted by his staunch far left critics, who attacked almost all of his programs including those which benefited the poor. Some have elaborated new definitions of Noynoying, including "clean, truthful, and not corrupt", "criticized but left a more prosperous Philippines after his administration", "a decent, gentle, and pro-country administration, which gives a sense of pride to Filipinos", and "an administration which allows and recognizes criticisms as part of democracy". Despite the harsh criticism from political rivals who jabbed at him regardless of the issue, his administration never banned, harassed, and/or closed any agencies or personalities, a move which was in line with Aquino's personal pro-democracy stances.

== History ==
=== First documented by media, 2011 ===
The term was first documented in the October 8, 2011, issue of Manila Standard Today. In their opinion article, columnists Karl Allan Barlaan and Christian Cardiente criticized Aquino's slow response over typhoons Pedring and Quiel, which left parts of Luzon island, including Metro Manila, in a state of calamity.

Aquino convened the National Disaster Risk Reduction and Management Council five days after Pedring hit the country and a full week before overseeing distribution of food and water to the survivors, which was after he attended the 30th anniversary celebrations of McDonald's in the Philippines.

They wrote: "The opposition called the government’s calamity response 'insensitive, indifferent, and slow.' Palace ally House Speaker Feliciano Belmonte Jr. urged the President to visit the typhoon victims 'to boost their morale.' The Internet was abuzz with a newly-coined word, 'noynoying.' The word translates to 'procrastinating,' members of a UP Diliman alumni social networking group say."

=== Use in street protests, 2012 onwards ===
An infographic distributed by youth rights group Anakbayan that instructs how to perform Noynoying and share it through social media

Five months later, student protesters denounced the rise in oil prices and college tuition rates by performing what they call "Noynoying." They make "effortless" poses, wherein they lounged on the ground looking bored and idle. Vencer Crisostomo, national chairman of youth rights group Anakbayan, said the Noynoying poses reflected how Aquino had done nothing to cushion the impact of or prevent the increase in oil prices and tuition rates. He defined Noynoying as "when you do nothing when in fact you have something to do."

This protest activity was also created in response to warnings that protesters caught planking on the streets would be arrested.

Proceeding protests adopted the act of Noynoying, or using the term in their statements. A group of farmers from Hacienda Luisita lounged in front of Supreme Court on March 19, 2012, as they plea to uphold its ruling ordering the distribution of about 6,400 hectares of land owned by Aquino's clan, the Cojuangcos. They also accused Aquino of intimidating the Supreme Court so that it would overturn the ruling on distribution, or grant the demand of Hacienda Luisita, Inc. of ₱10 billion (US$232,340,000) in just compensation in case the land is dispersed. Child rights advocates also integrated Noynoying in their protests on March 17, 2012, as they expressed concern over the increasing number of children becoming victims of human rights violations under Aquino's term. Fernando Hicap, national chairperson of Pambansang Lakas ng Kilusang Mamamalakaya ng Pilipinas (National Federation of Fisherfolk Organizations, PAMALAKAYA), warned Aquino that an impending increase in electricity rates in May 2012 is "inviting the Filipino people" to protest against Malacañang and Energy Regulatory Commission. He added: "It is time send an earthshaking notice to a Noynoying presidency in Malacañang." At an average of ₱8.48 (US$0.20) per kilowatt hour, the Philippines has the most expensive electricity rate in Asia and Oceania regions.

Labor rights groups also introduced an offshoot of Noynoying called "Noy-ngaling," a portmanteau of Noynoy and the Tagalog word "sinungaling" (liar). They urged Malacañang to stop "misinforming" its people that a ₱125 (US$2.90) raise in minimum wage would lead to higher unemployment rate.

=== Use in criticisms apart from Aquino ===
Representative and Teodoro Casiño of Bayan Muna (Nation First) partylist, said that the House of Representatives, led by Speaker of the House Feliciano Belmonte, Jr., was "Noynoying" on the proposed measure to remove value added tax on petroleum products. Belmonte stated that such proposals are "not going to get anywhere."

Deputy Minority Leader of the House of Representatives Milagros Magsaysay of First District of Zambales accused fellow Representative Henedina Abad of Lone District of Batanes of "not only 'Noynoying' on the resolutions aimed at solving the recurring power problem in Mindanao, but... also 'Noynoying' on several bills and resolutions on oil." The statement was made after Abad defended Department of Energy Secretary Jose Rene Almendras against calls for his resignation over the looming power crisis in Mindanao Island, located in the country's south.

Crisostomo said that the Philippine government's "Noynoying" on tuition fee hikes is "pushing parents to extreme desperation," citing a report about a mechanic who killed himself due to problems relating to rising education costs. He also claimed that Aquino's administration did "nothing" to regulate tuition and other school fee increases.

John Leonard Monterona, Middle East regional coordinator of Overseas Filipino Workers (OFW) rights group Migrante, wrote that OFWs were "exposed to Noynoying daily" from embassy and labor officials who he claimed did not provide needed assistance over the rampant abuse and labor malpractices committed against Filipinos working abroad.

=== Media coverage and spread on social networks ===
The Noynoying protests, as well as the debate on Aquino's work ethic and the Internet meme that came out of it, had received coverage from local and international news media, including The Wall Street Journal, France 24, BBC World Service, Los Angeles Times, and Al Jazeera.

Since then, a number of newspapers and websites published photos of Aquino at work. Presidential deputy spokesperson Abigail Valte denied allegations that the photos were released to counter the "Noynoying" protesters. She also expressed her dismay at the protesters for making it appear that Aquino was doing nothing to control the rising oil prices.

Noynoying also became a "trending keyword" on Twitter and has its own Facebook page. Prominent local personalities—including entertainment reporter Ogie Diaz, DJ Mo Twister, and broadcasters Jove Francisco and Paolo Bediones—also posted tweets that contain the hashtag "#noynoying".

== Reception ==
=== Response from Malacañang ===
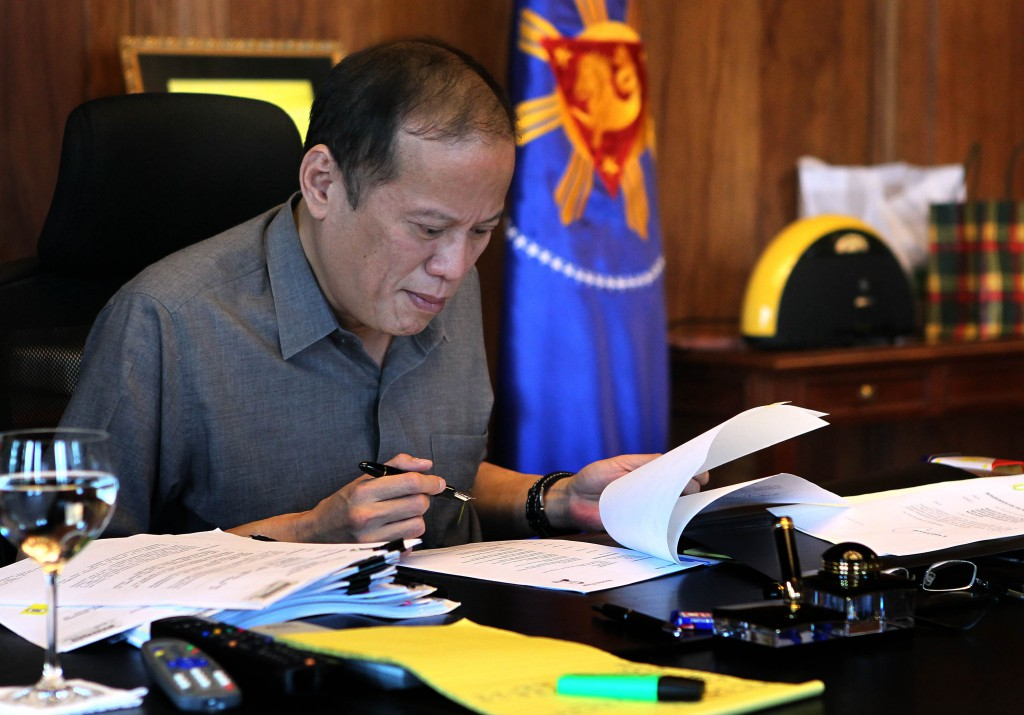
The Office of the President of the Philippines released a series of photographs, including this one, that showed President Benigno Aquino III at work. The Office denied these were published to counter the Noynoying protests.

Representatives of Malacañang belittled the use of Noynoying as a form of protest. Presidential spokesperson Edwin Lacierda said on March 15, 2012, that Noynoying was meant to antagonize Aquino, adding that it will not sell to the public.

In a press conference, Aquino declared that the public should not pay attention to Noynoying, adding that the term is a product of people who have nothing good to say. "Papaano mo ipapakita sa ayaw tumingin? Paano mo iparirinig sa ayaw makinig? Kung masaya silang ginagawa nila 'yun, nasa kanila 'yon." ("How will you show it to people who refuse to look? How will you express it to people who refuse to listen? If they are happy with what they are doing, that's on them.")

He also claims his administration is doing everything to ease the effects of oil price hikes, including subsidies to public transportation drivers as well as substantial discounts on tires, car batteries, and vehicle spare parts.

In an interview with Agence France-Presse, Aquino countered criticisms about Noynoying by pointing to the Philippines' positive economic factors under his administration, including a "stable" inflation rate of 2.7 percent, as well as a recent survey by Pulse Asia that showed his popularity ratings at 70 percent, with only 9 percent disapproval. This was despite what critics said about the country's GDP of 3.7 percent last year due to cuts in government spending.

=== Reactions from other government officials and politicians ===
Vice President Jejomar Binay also defended Aquino, telling the student groups to give Aquino "a break." Senate President Juan Ponce Enrile advised Aquino to remain unfazed amid the Noynoying tag and instead focus his attention to his work. Senators Teofisto Guingona III and Francis Escudero called Noynoying "unfair," "uncalled for," and "disrespectful." Representative Sherwin Tugna of Citizens' Battle Against Corruption (CIBAC) party-list called Noynoying "baseless" because Aquino is "walking his talk on fighting corruption in government." Representative Jerry P. Treñas of Iloilo City countered the claims of protesters, saying Aquino is a "hands-on worker who shuns much publicity on his projects and programs but only wanted to go ahead, work and accomplish the projects."

Department of Budget and Management Secretary Florencio Abad predicted that the Noynoying craze would soon fizzle. Meanwhile, Department of Transportation and Communications Secretary Mar Roxas, who ran alongside Aquino for vice president in 2010, shared his favorable definitions of Noynoying including "somebody who always tells the truth;" "somebody who is careful about people’s money, who does not borrow recklessly and who does not spend recklessly;" and "somebody who is putting our country on the straight and narrow." Technical Education and Skills Development Authority Secretary Joel Villanueva said he is a "living testimony of how the President works," narrating his time with Aquino as he gave out "bowler bonds" to some 15,000 people in Cavite.

Governor Joey Salceda of Albay Province debunked Noynoying, claiming Aquino has created 2.1 million jobs last October 2011 and 1.2 million jobs last January 2012, as well as his "disbursement acceleration program" which Salceda claimed he computed to be "not less than 5.7 percent of the country’s gross domestic product." He added that Aquino is benefiting from the United States of America's economic rebound. Meanwhile, Cotabato Governor Emmylou Taliño-Mendoza called on Malacañang to stop Noynoying and quickly find a solution to the long brownouts in her province and parts of Mindanao.

Vencer Crisostomo of Anakbayan claimed the photographs being released by the Office of the President, which they believed were meant to counter "Noynoying," did not convince Filipino netizens. Instead, the photos were being "modified" or being given the "meme" treatment.

=== Reactions from media ===
Political pundit Conrado de Quiros of Philippine Daily Inquirer called Noynoying "a horrendous contretemps," even calling out the groups behind the Noynoying protests as supporters of Manny Villar during his presidential campaign in 2010, which Aquino won. Columnist William M. Esposo of The Philippine Star called Noynoying "baseless, if not outright insulting to a head of State, and doesn’t deserve presidential rebuttal." He added: "Noynoying cannot shame P-Noy - but only those rabble-rousing Leftists and P-Noy haters perpetrating it." He previously declared that Noynoying is "the latest concoction of the Reds."

Sun Star Cebu columnist Pachico A. Seares referred to Noynoying as "the N word," adding that while the Aquino administration claimed it was downplaying the Noynoying criticisms, the fact that Aquino and his representatives tackled the issue gave it "time and energy that it's not supposed to merit." Writing for Global Inquirer Nation, Benjamin Pimentel opined that Malacañang could have taken a "more creative" approach to Noynoying than putting out pictures to prove the protesters wrong, adding that such reaction reminded him of how Aquino's mother, former President Corazon Aquino, called a press conference in her bedroom and showed the small space under her bed to counter allegations that she hid underneath it during one of six coup attempts early in her administration. "If he had rolled with the Noynoyers, Noynoy could have even tied it to the tourism campaign by saying, 'Protesting — it’s more fun in the Philippines.'"

Romeo Lim of Malaya could only "shake his head" if Noynoying would define Aquino's administration, even listing the different monikers of past Philippine presidents that described their governments such as "Dictator" for Ferdinand Marcos, "Mestizo" for Manuel L. Quezon, and "Mambo Magsaysay" for Ramon Magsaysay.

In her Lifestyle column, Gilda Cordero-Fernando of Philippine Daily Inquirer listed out her "definitions" of Noynoying, all of which were favorable to Aquino. The list included "never to stop believing in the possibility of a clean government;" "being fearless, not being afraid to step into such big shoes;" and "shooting straight between the eyes of the enemy." Boo Chanco of The Philippine Star opined that while coining the term "Noynoying" to define Aquino's performance was "unfair," he offered his "more damaging" definition of Noynoying: how Aquino allegedly coddled "incompetent" friends he appointed to public office. Chanco stated this kind of Noynoying is "costing the local economy some serious money."

Elinando B. Cinco of Manila Bulletin wrote that the definition of Noynoying assumes a "cruel insinuation of which the President is not or does not possess." He also compared a Noynoying person to a Filipino folk tale hero Juan Tamad (Lazy John), while berating Mar Roxas for trying to counter the Noynoying criticism by introducing "P-Noying." He wrote: "You see, Mr. Secretary, in marketing communication, imitating an already popular phrase or word will only remind the public or consumers of the original one. Elementary! And besides, you run the risk of being labeled a poor copycat!"

Meanwhile, pundit Federico D. Pascual Jr. of The Philippine Star wrote that the reason why Noynoying has caught the attention of the public and even international media because "it is true." He even claimed that while the Wikipedia entry of Noynoying was subject to deletion, the newly coined word would take root, "thanks to Noynoy Aquino himself." Bobby Nalzaro of Sun Star Cebu "partly agreed" with leftist organizations that conducted Noynoying protests, which he said was not far from a word he coined to describe Aquino: AIDS (As If Doing Something). "P-Noy has focused on his anti-corruption campaign and has neglected the other aspects of his governance," Nalzaro wrote. Luis V. Teodoro of BusinessWorld wrote that perception toward Aquino about being laid-back—that "(Aquino) is more preoccupied with dating rather than assessing typhoon damage, or with sampling Manila night life rather than defusing a hostage crisis"—was already widespread before Anakbayan introduced the Noynoying protests.

Jojo A. Robles of Manila Standard Today shared his "comprehensive definition" of Noynoying: where Aquino does things he believes are important, like removing Supreme Court Chief Justice Renato Corona from office, even if these do nothing to improve the lives of Filipinos. In another article, he wrote: "Indeed, almost everything Aquino has done so far can be considered Noynoying. And when he’s done, Aquino may look back at how he spent his laid-back years in office as a job that kept him from doing the things he’d much rather be doing, if he hadn’t been saddled with something that, for the first time in his life, required him to work."

France 24 reported that when Malacañang posted the photo of Noynoy at work, allegedly in response to the criticism, critics chose instead to focus on the fact that remote controls for a TV and a DVD player were among the contents of the president's table.

In the BBC World Service coverage on Noynoying, correspondent to the Philippines Kate McGeown said that Aquino could not seem to shake off the impression about him being idle despite his popularity. She also described Aquino as "relaxed" based on several times she had met him. Presenter Paul Henley then wrapped up the program Newshour by playing "The Lazy Song" by Bruno Mars.

=== Reactions from economists ===
In addition to arguing that "the campaign and the connotations attached to it are both inaccurate and unfair" economist Andrew James Masigan argued in his Numbers Don't Lie column for the Manila Bulletin that the phrase "Noynoying" has gone viral "at a time when the country is just on the brink of turning its image around," with global financial institutions finally taking notice of efforts that have given the Philippines "the strongest economic fundamentals in the region.'"

=== Reactions from academe ===
David Michael M. San Juan, who teaches Filipino in De La Salle University, wrote that past administrations (not just that of Aquino) have been "Noynoying" to eliminate poverty in the Philippines. He added: "While many of our people suffer from extreme destitution, we have at least six dollar-billionaires and a number of peso-billionaires. The Philippine government does nothing but perpetuate the unjust status quo." He also illustrated how the elite holds control over the country's economy and politics, starting from Aquino who belonged in a clan of billionaire businessmen.

== Evolution ==
On June 24, 2021, President Aquino died at the age of 61. Soon after, tributes poured from all political colors and camps. Some of the most common sentiments were the public's appreciation of Aquino's incorruptibility, deep respect in the supremacy of the Constitution and the rule of law, and keenness to details.

Award-winning writer and TV5 host Lourd de Veyra, in his news segment Word of the Lourd (WOTL), offered a new meaning to the term “Noynoying”.

“Noynoying—batid na ang pagpuna ay bahagi ng demokrasya. At pag napipikon, kahit anong banat sa kanya ng media, walang pina-ban, walang hinarass, at higit sa lahat, walang pinasara.” (“Noynoying—expecting that criticism is a part of democracy. And when provoked, no matter what the media says, he doesn't respond with bans, harassment, and most of all, doesn't forcibly close them.”)

— Lourd de Veyra, Word of the Lourd (WOTL) news segment; June 25, 2021 edition

== See also ==
- Political positions of Benigno Aquino III
- Ferdinand Marcos's cult of personality
- Trumpism
- Diehard Duterte Supporters
- Dutertismo
