= Filipino Freethinkers =

- Founded: February 2009
- Founder: Ryan "Red" Tani
- Purpose: Reason, Science, Secularism
- Location: Metro Manila, Philippines
- Key people: Ryan "Red" Tani (President) Kristine Chan (Reproductive Health Advocacy Director); Garrick Bercero (Affiliations Director); Dustin Celestino (Freedom of Expression Advocacy Director); Pepe Bawagan (Secularism Advocacy Director); Kevin Enriquez (LGBT Advocacy Director) Pecier Decierdo (Science Advocacy Director)
- Website: filipinofreethinkers.org

Filipino Freethinkers (also known as FF) is the largest and most active organization for freethought in the Philippines. It aims to promote reason, science, and secularism as a means of improving every Filipino's quality of life.

FF is active in the secularism movement, working to promote the passage of the Reproductive Health Bill. They also fight for equal rights for women and the LGBT community, and have been regular participants in Metro Manila Pride March events since 2010.

They work with other organizations doing mobilization activities and were part of the Occupy for RH movement in 2011. They also advocate freedom of expression and science education.

The organization and its different chapters hold informal meet-ups, usually in coffee shops and restaurants. In between general meet-ups every other week, some chapters opt to hold local meet-ups.

== History ==
Filipino Freethinkers was founded by Ryan "Red" Tani. It was officially established on February 1, 2009, when members of the Filipino Freethinkers Yahoo! Group had their first meetup. The organization then began meeting-up regularly in coffee shops to discuss current events, politics, theology, science, and other topics related to secularism and freethought.

=== Excommunication Party ===
On November 26, 2010, the organization hosted an "Excommunication Party" (full title “If Supporting the RH Bill Means Excommunication, Excommunicate Me!”), as a protest against the Catholic Church's opposition to the Reproductive Health Bill.

=== Bantay Bishop ===
In July 2011, certain Roman Catholic bishops admitted to receiving SUVs from the Philippine Charity Sweepstakes Office (PCSO). This allegedly violated certain Philippine laws that prohibit and/or limit transactions between religious and state institutions under the principle of secularism. In reaction, FF founded the "Bantay Bishop Movement" and spearheaded a protest demonstration on July 13, 2011, in front of the Philippine Senate alongside other activist groups that denounced the bishops' behavior.

=== March against art censorship ===
On August 21, 2011, FF and other organizations gathered at the Cultural Center of the Philippines to protest censorship and show their support for freedom of expression following the controversy generated by the exhibition there of Mideo Cruz's installation art piece titled Poleteismo. Catholic groups labeled Poleteismo as blasphemous for juxtaposing religious images and representations of genitalia, among many other objects. FF also emphasized the legal argument against censorship by referring to General Comment 34, a document released by the United Nations Human Rights Committee, which affirms blasphemy as a human right.

=== Globe Tatt Awards ===
On August 26, 2011, FF was awarded "The One" award in the Globe Tatt Awards, "for leading the pack in terms of online popularity and shaping opinion in the local online community".

=== Reason, Science, Secularism (R.S.S.) Forum and Awards ===
On April 1, 2012, FF held their own "Reason, Science, and Secularism Forum" at U.P.–Ayala Land TechnoHub, cosponsored by the University of the Philippines Center for Women's Studies. The forum was held to discuss issues such as the reproductive health bill, freedom of expression, science, freedom of religion, and rights of lesbian, gay, bisexual and transgender (LGBT) people.

The R.S.S Awards were presented during the forum, with each winner receiving a trophy and 10,000 pesos awarded to their cause. The winners were former law dean Raul Pangalangan for the Reason Award, astrophysicist Reina Reyes for the Science Award, and RH-bill author Senator Pia Cayetano for the Secularism Award.

Additionally, a Bigot of the Year award was given to Senator Vicente “Tito” Sotto III as “a Filipino who best exemplifies irrational prejudice against a group of people, and who has used considerable power and influence to offend and oppress this group.”. The 10,000 pesos prize for the award was donated to an organization that works for the betterment of the offended group or supports a cause opposed by the winner.
