= Political positions of Leni Robredo =

Views of the 14th Philippine Vice President

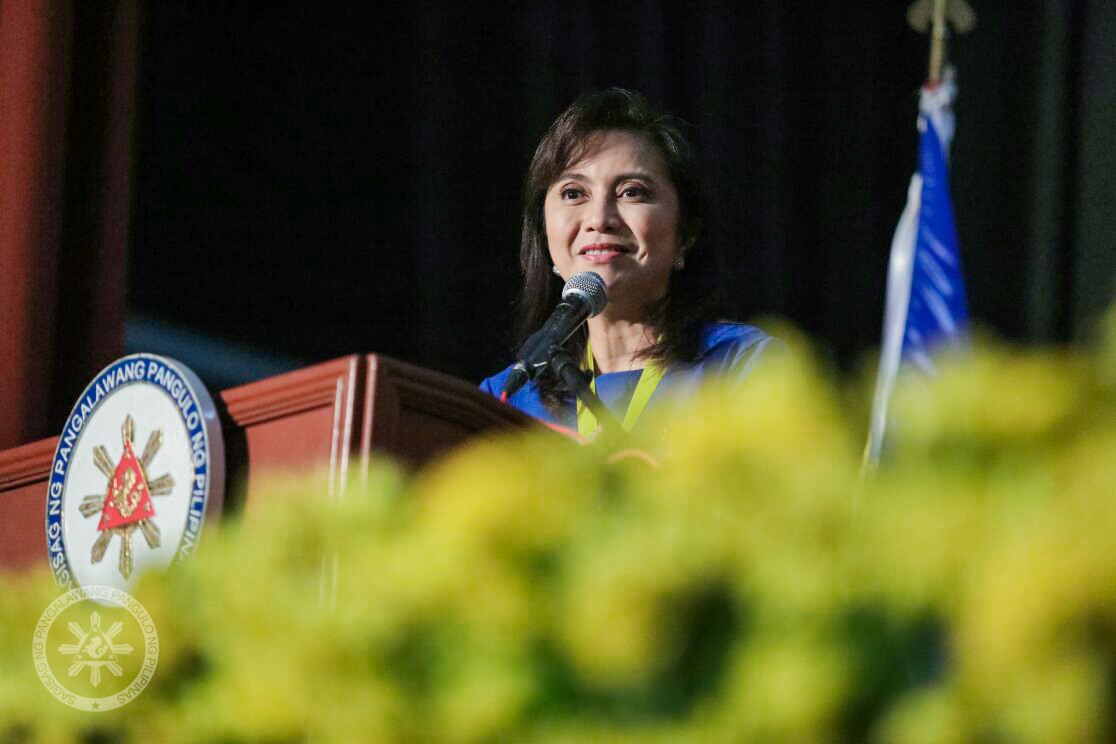
Robredo at the San Sebastian College – Recoletos in Manila, Philippines

Leni Robredo, the 14th Vice President of the Philippines, has held various foreign, domestic, economic, and social positions over the course of her career. She has supported women's rights and women empowerment, human rights, ending endo contractualization, and policies that are pro-poor. As the chairperson of the Liberal Party during her vice presidency, Robredo was the leader of the opposition against President Rodrigo Duterte, taking positions contrary to those of the Duterte administration's policies, opposing federalism and charter change, the reimposition of the death penalty, warmer relations with China, and the war on drugs.

== Basic political and governance views ==
=== Ferdinand Marcos' burial at the Heroes' Cemetery ===
Robredo opposed Duterte's approval of a hero's burial for the former president and dictator Ferdinand Marcos and criticized the secretive burial as being “like a thief in the night”. After members of the Supreme Court voted nine to five in favor of Marcos’ burial at the Heroes’ Cemetery, Robredo aired her criticisms through Facebook and Twitter, stating that “Marcos was a thief, a murderer and a dictator. He is no hero.” She also criticized the Armed Forces of the Philippines and the Philippine National Police for being complicit and for assisting in the execution of the burial.

=== Robredo's resignation from the Duterte Cabinet ===
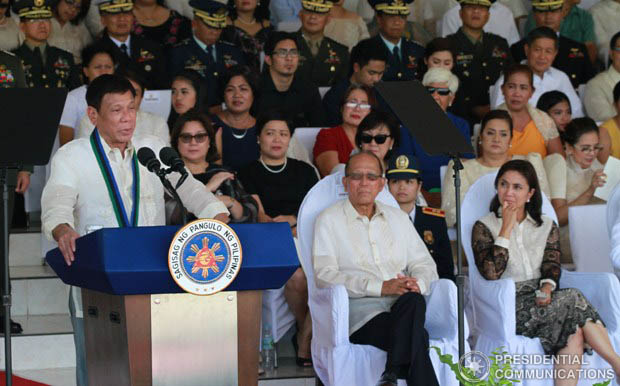
President Duterte informally meets Vice President Robredo for the first time in public at a turnover ceremony held in Camp Aguinaldo, Quezon City

Days after the first informal meeting between President Duterte and Vice President Robredo, the latter was offered the top post at the Housing and Urban Development Coordinating Council through a televised phone call. Months later, Robredo would tender her resignation through a letter to President Duterte dated December 5, 2016, citing a ₱19-billion budget cut for all key shelter agencies, inaction on her appointment recommendations to make the HUDCC more effective, and Duterte's pronouncement that Bongbong Marcos could be the new Vice President if his election protest succeeds (necessitating her resignation from her HUDCC post to protect the office she was elected to). Her resignation also came after Duterte directed her to stop attending all Cabinet meetings.

=== Duterte's declaration of a state of emergency ===
After Duterte's initial declaration of a state of national emergency after a Davao City terrorist attack, the Vice President, despite coming from the opposition, announced that she respects the declaration for as long as it does not trample on the Constitution or fundamental rights. She remarked, “We reiterate our call that we bring to justice those responsible for the violence in Davao and at the same time, our bill of rights is followed and treated with utmost respect.”

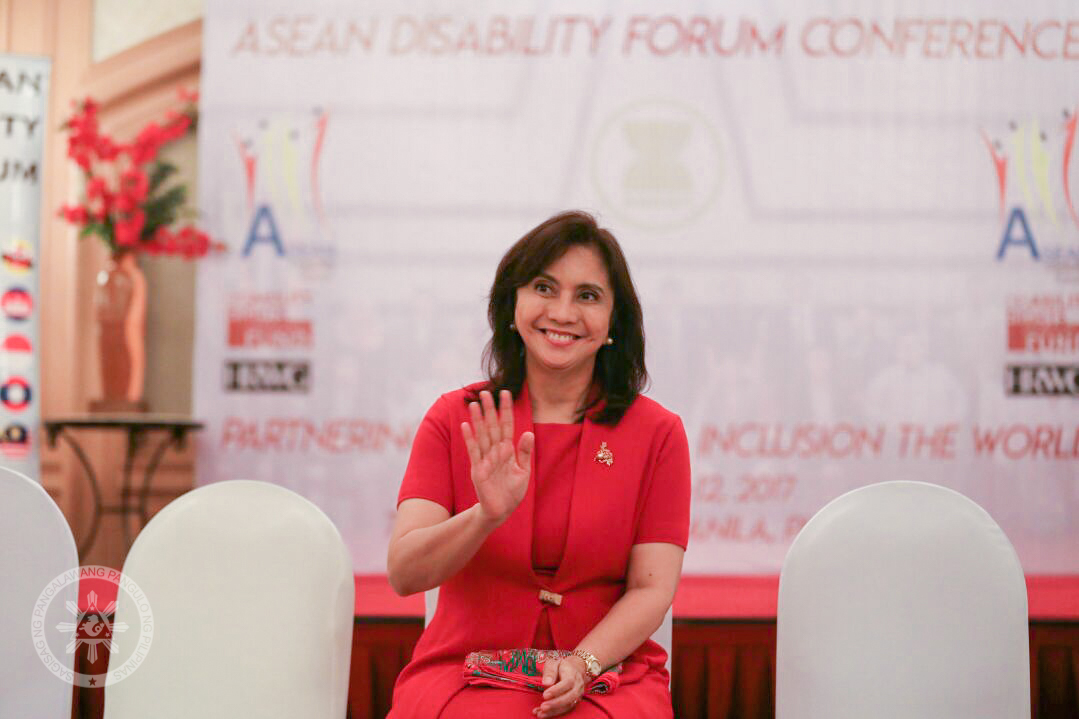
Leni Robredo at the ASEAN Disability Forum

=== Human rights and extrajudicial killings ===
Robredo, a human rights lawyer before entering politics, spoke against the killings involving drug users that occurred during President Duterte's drug war, noting that while there is indeed a need for an anti-drug campaign, rehabilitation of drug addicts is more important than punishment. Robredo aired her concerns over the vigilantism and violence associated with the Duterte administration's war on drugs, despite her support of the policy. She later condemned all the violence committed, adding her opposition to the culture of fear being established that did not value human rights. Robredo described the war on drugs as a mere front to justify the violence. She has insisted that violence against drug-use violators is unnecessary, stating that it is the drugs that the country should be going after. In March 2017, she called for international investigations into the administration's method of conducting its war on drugs, which she believed led to other abuses, such as the battering up of those who demanded search warrants and the detention of relatives of people accused. An impeachment complaint was filed against Robredo following her statement; President Duterte came out to oppose the initiative, however, telling his allies to stop the plan, citing democracy and freedom of speech.

==== Detention of Leila De Lima ====
Opposition senator Leila De Lima was implicated by the Duterte government in illegal-drug activities during her stint as justice secretary, with an alleged love affair between her and her driver and bodyguard also being exposed. De Lima had expected such charges to be filed against her by her former office, the Department of Justice, and called the possible arrest as a product of “false and railroaded drug charges.” Vice President Leni Robredo opposed the arrest, describing it as being politically motivated. Robredo also alleged that the charges were driven by De Lima's political opposition to the Duterte presidency rather than by her being guilty of possessing illegal drugs.

The arrest of the Senator was not barred by the Supreme Court, with the court voting in October 2017 to keep her in jail. De Lima's appeal for reconsideration was junked by the Supreme Court in April 2018. In June 2024, however, two years after the end of Duterte's term in 2022, the last charge against the now former senator was dismissed, and De Lima was released. Robredo had called for De Lima's release in May 2022 after star witnesses in the Senator's case said they were merely forced to testify against the then-senator, thereby retracting their testimonies. De Lima, while in prison, was part of Robredo's senatorial slate during Robredo's 2022 presidential run.

=== The federalist movement ===
Robredo opposed calls for federalism, citing the varying levels of readiness of the regions that depend on the national government for income. She questioned the form and model that the Duterte government intended to implement, asked what it is that the program seeks to solve, questioning likewise the readiness of the Philippines, the trustworthiness of the Constitutional Assembly, and the financial independence of local governments. In January 2018, her camp expressed their opposition to the plan to abolish the Office of the Vice President under the draft for a federalist constitution. Opposition lawyer Christian Monsod stated in July 2018 that the transitory provisions of the draft could be used to nullify Robredo's right to the Philippines' leadership succession. That same month, Robredo questioned anew the need for a transition to federalism.

[In October 2018, a draft constitution was passed in the House of Representatives, in which draft Section 4, Article XVII on the Transitory Provisions set the Senate President, rather than the Vice President, as the successor of the President. This was proposed by Speaker Gloria Macapagal Arroyo and 21 other lawmakers. Vicente Veloso, the House chairperson on constitutional amendments, cited the instability of the Office of the Vice President, given the electoral protest filed by Bongbong Marcos. Robredo's election lawyer, Romulo Macalintal, questioned the group's basing their succession emendation on a pending election protest. The provision was amended days later, restoring Robredo's role in the succession line.]

=== The implementation of the Tax Reform for Acceleration and Inclusion (TRAIN) Law ===
When the first implementation of the TRAIN program was signed on December 19, 2017, its critics became weary of the increase in fuel prices that would offset wage earners' savings from their tax cuts. Inflation rose to four percent in January, continuing to rise to 6.7 percent by October 2018. With rising prices of basic goods, Robredo called for the government to act on aiding the poor by fulfilling its promised Conditional Cash Transfer program, regardless of whether or not this rise was indeed caused by the TRAIN law. Robredo also later urged stakeholders to review the TRAIN program, given the continuous rise in inflation rate that was affecting the poor. Robredo and the Liberal Party then suggested a review of the safety nets that are meant to ease the effect of inflation on the poor. Amid rising prices, she also asked the Senate, House of Representatives, and President Duterte to certify as urgent a bill that would stop the added tax on fuel.

=== Presidential run platform: Open government, participatory democracy, welfarism ===
With running-mate Kiko Pangilinan, Robredo ran for President in 2022 under an open government and participatory democracy platform. Citing her late husband's brand of left-wing populism that would wear the common people's cheap flip-flops in his daily meeting with them, she also invoked a welfarist or social liberal ethic for Philippine governance.

As part of her favor for transparency while a Congressman between 2013 and 2016, Robredo sponsored a bill (HB05831) that would later be enacted on December 9, 2015 as the Tax Incentives Management and Transparency Act - Republic Act RA10708, an act promoting fiscal accountability and transparency in the granting and management of tax incentives. The first law she authored in Congress but was not passed by the 16th Congress was the Full Disclosure Policy Bill (HB 19), which would have been a law that would mandate all government agencies and their sub-units and projects to disclose their budget and financial transactions in a conspicuous manner "without any requests from the public." Robredo also authored the People Empowerment Bill (HB 4911[38]), which sought to allow more participation by Filipinos in government's decision- and policy-making, and the Participatory Budget Process Bill (HB 3905), which sought to increase participation by locals in budget-related decisions concerning government projects.

After her presidential run's defeat in the May 9, 2022 election and the end of her term as Vice President, Robredo put up an NGO, the Angat Buhay Foundation, to continue her collaboration with civil society in aiding the marginalized.

== Social policy ==
=== Death penalty ===
During the vice presidential debates of April 2016, Robredo gave her thumbs down to the question regarding the imposition of the death penalty to the crime of corruption. In May 2016, Robredo again expressed her opposition to the death penalty as a policy. This was in opposition to then-presidential candidate Duterte's promise to reintroduce capital punishment and launch a war against crime, which reintroduction was supposed to be applied to drug crimes, rape, murder, and robbery. In her argument, Robredo cited the absence of statistics linking diminished crime with an imposed death penalty and even with the occurrence of wrongful convictions carrying the death sentence.

=== Divorce ===
During the campaign period in 2016, Robredo expressed her desire to fix the annulment system before tackling the issue of divorce. Her aim was to make the system easy to access, especially for the poor and marginalized. She also supported making a spouse's physical and emotional abuse as grounds for annulment. Robredo would repeat her views in March 2018, stating her openness to a divorce bill that even the poor could access. She added, however, that she does not want people to take marriage for granted, stressing its sanctity.

=== Labor and contractualization ===
On July 4, 2016, Robredo vowed to collaborate with the Duterte government in pushing for more jobs and ending contractualization in spite of their political differences. One of the items she proposed was the abolition of end-of-contract (ENDO) practices that have been preventing laborers from acquiring permanent jobs. Robredo also called on both worker organizations and employer associations to talk about a compromise position between the interest of workers who cannot find permanent jobs because of end-of-contract practices and that of businesses that become less competitive and run deficits under a strict labor policy.

=== Women's rights ===
Robredo supports feminism and equal rights, citing the role of women in inclusive development. She has repeatedly called for men to respect women and to stand up against misogyny and bigotry, stating that inappropriate and tasteless remarks have no place in society. Days before her inauguration as vice president, Robredo stated her advocacy of anti-poverty and pro-women programs. In May 2017, she likewise stated the importance of creating economic improvements for women in the mission to give them greater freedom from abuse. Robredo aided women through the Angat Buhay Project of her office, which oversaw the growth of women's businesses. Robredo has stated the bigger importance of quiet strength and collaboration, in contrast to leading, in promoting gender equality. She has also urged women to protect their right to vote, reminding them of the plebiscite on April 30, 1937, that allowed women to participate in the country's elections. Robredo, however, opposes abortion, although she made statements about being open to its decriminalization.

Former President Duterte had repeatedly made controversial misogynistic statements, with some directed towards Robredo, which Natdem women's group Gabriela and Vice President Robredo herself flagged as inappropriate. Robredo opined that the Duterte administration had gone back to a culture of misogyny and bigotry that has put women politicians in the present at a disadvantage. After Duterte made his controversial rape joke, Robredo stressed that rapists are the sole causes of rape and not the pretty women who had become their victims.

=== LGBT rights ===
In 2016, the Office of the Vice President tweeted that while Robredo is opposed to same-sex marriage, she supports same-sex civil unions. During a CNN Philippines debate on February 27, 2022, Robredo stated, "I am all for civil unions," adding that she is in agreement with Pope Francis' view on the subject.

== Economic policy ==
=== Infrastructure ===
During a business keynote on November 17, 2021, as the Covid-19 pandemic continued, Robredo promised to encourage outdoor economic activity "to reduce the risk of infection in closed and crowded areas". She also vowed to review and expand the Duterte administration's nationwide bike lane network program, proposing to increase the bicycle infrastructure budget from ₱1.6 billion to ₱14 billion for the installation of more bicycle lanes around the country.

== Foreign policy ==
=== South China Sea dispute ===
Robredo has called for peaceful public action and unity against China's militarization of the South China Sea. On May 22, 2018, Robredo and Associate Justice Antonio Carpio suggested the government's filing of a formal protest against China's militarization of the area, after a long-range bomber was landed in the contested area. Robredo described the consequences of China's militarization as similar to Japan's invasion of the Philippines during World War II, as China's continued assertion of its nine-dash line means that the Philippines could lose control over its exclusive economic zone.

=== China–Philippines relations ===
Robredo opposed the Duterte administration's appeasement policy of setting aside the Philippines' arbitration award and pushing for better relations with the People's Republic of China. She reiterated that China must be met with diplomatic resistance everytime it violates international law, citing that smaller, less powerful nations must not suffer from China's aggressive expansionism. Robredo has also warned against the country's falling into a debt trap after the Duterte government pursued deals with China. Robredo said that assessing the deals Duterte made with China has been difficult due to the administration's lack of transparency. She stressed that while the Philippines is indeed in need of financing, it should not however give up its sovereignty. She added that Filipinos should be more watchful towards China's loans, as these might come with undesirable consequences.

=== Overseas Filipino workers' deployment ban to Kuwait ===
After news of widespread abuse of overseas Filipino workers (OFWs) and the discovery of a Filipina worker's body in a freezer in Kuwait, Duterte ordered distressed OFWs to be sent back home. Duterte also banned the deployment of OFWs to Kuwait in February 2018, saying that he would ban deployment of Filipino labor to countries that abuse Filipino migrant workers. Robredo supported the move of Duterte to ban OFWs from serving in Kuwait, but urged the government to come up with a bilateral deal with the country concerned to continue the economic tie and protect the OFWs from abuse at the same time.

After relations between the two countries deteriorated, with allegations that the Philippine Embassy took distressed Filipinos directly from Kuwaiti households, Robredo called for "decisive steps" to solve the diplomatic dilemma caused by the rescue missions done by the Philippine Embassy. After a memorandum of agreement was signed with Kuwait on May 11, 2018, President Duterte lifted its labor deployment to Kuwait ban on May 15, 2018.
