= Political positions of Mar Roxas =

Mar Roxas delivered his speech in front of barangay officials in Quezon City on February 17, 2016.

Liberal Party presidential candidate Mar Roxas has taken positions on many national issues, including votes and remarks, since his election as senator during the 2004 Philippine elections, up until his appointment as the Secretary of the Interior and Local Government.

== Social policy ==
=== Education ===
In July 2007, Roxas filed several bills in his first through the creation of a “people’s fund” for education that will help close the resource gaps in teachers’ training and salaries, infrastructure needs like classrooms and school buildings, among others.

He also sought to increase the measly salaries of public school teachers, he filed a bill to mandate the upgrade of the government salary schedule under the Salary Standardization law every four years, or whenever necessary, to the prevailing cost of living index. For the benefit of students in private schools, he filed a proposed Pre-Need Code, which seeks to tighten-up the regulation of pre-need companies. He has also consistently pushed for increases in the budget of the Department of Education.

=== Energy policy ===
Senator Mar Roxas, then chairman of the committee on economic affairs, trade and commerce, sought amendments to the power industry reform law to allow large electricity consumers to directly connect with state-owned National Power Corporation or any independent power producers to supply their power requirements.

He also supports the use of biofuels. He believes that it will definitely reduce the country's dependence on imported oil once biofuels manufacturers begin operations in the country.

Recently, he urged the trade, energy and finance departments to help ease the impact of rising petroleum prices on consumers.

“I urge the three departments to plan and calibrate our responses [to rising oil prices] so as not to undermine [the] gains in the economy and financial markets,” said Roxas, chairman of the committee on trade and commerce.

He said wage earners had to tighten their belts some more each time petroleum prices rose, and in particular the prices of cooking gas.

“Any increase in the prices of liquefied petroleum gas and kerosene upsets the household budget for food and other essential needs,” he said.

=== Health care ===
Roxas' position on health care has been highlighted with his cheaper medicines bill that would reduce the prices of medicine by allowing local pharmaceutical companies to manufacture drugs whose patents had already expired, by expanding the parallel imports of commonly used drugs, and by aggressively promoting the production and consumption of generic drugs.

Under the bill, the President is empowered to impose price ceilings on medicines on the recommendation of the secretaries of health and of trade and industry in times of calamity, and if there is widespread price manipulation of any drugs.

His bill also calls for the creation of a Drug Prices Regulation Board and the strengthening of the Bureau of Food and Drugs (BFAD).

Although there has been controversy regarding his authorship of the law and his actual positions. He has also been accused of watering down the cheaper medicines act, and is actually in support of mulch-nationals.

But on October 9, 2007, he dropped his objection to the version of the House of Representatives which proposes setting up of market controls and conceded that the sponsors of a similar bill in the House correctly anticipated that big drug companies could manipulate and prevent drugstores from selling imported cheaper medicines.

He said the use of price controls could come in if market competition from cheaper medicines from abroad and generic drugs do not work and make medicines affordable to the public.

=== Human rights ===
He expressed his deep concern over what he termed as “the rising tide of human-rights abuses” in the Philippines as exemplified by the abduction of five ordinary citizens belonging to the Union of the Masses for Democracy and Justice (UMDJ).

Roxas said that because of these incidents, well-established international organizations and institutions such as the London-based Amnesty International, Paris-based Reporters Sans Frontieres (Reporters Without Borders) and officials of the US government now hold the Philippines accountable for these apparent failures of governance.

He also expressed his concern over the possibility that there is a “shadow government operating in the deep background without the knowledge of Palace officials.”

According to Roxas, the Filipino people are entitled to forthright answers on how the abduction came about and who are the people behind it.

He also filed Senate Bill No. 110 which would decriminalize libel in the Philippines and limit the venue of filing libel suits. He believes in the right of individuals to be protected from unethical and irresponsible journalism, but for him, imprisonment is not a just penalty for such. He stresses that, civil damages are enough penalty and deterrence, considering the present economic situation of journalists.

=== Terrorism ===
He voted against the Human Security Act of 2007’s passage in the Senate because he believed that the fight against terror requires urgent operational reforms over measures that could impair civil liberties.

=== Death penalty ===
He opposed the revival of death penalty in the Philippines through execution. He said that the revival is not a permanent solution for a successful campaign against crimes.

=== Divorce ===
In an interview by Mel Tiangco on the GMA program Wanted: President on January 31, 2016, Roxas said that he is among the 40% of Filipinos who do not favor divorce during a Social Weather Stations poll in 2015, saying: "For me, the family is the center of each person's life, so we should do everything to ensure that the family remains intact and I think that's our country's foundation."

=== LGBT rights and same-sex marriage ===
While being interviewed on the GMA program Wanted: President, Roxas said that he is not in favor on the legalization of same-sex marriage as a public policy, saying: "As a public policy, I’m not in favor [of same sex-marriage]. Although I have relatives who I'm close to and have partners and I respect them, I love them, I accept them wholeheartedly." However, according to his wife Korina Sanchez, Roxas is supportive of LGBT rights and is in favor of a bill against gender and sexual orientation discrimination.

== Economic policy ==
=== Philippine entry into the Trans-Pacific Partnership ===
Roxas disagrees with the Aquino administration's moves to join the Trans-Pacific Partnership (TPP) trade agreement. Rather than entering a bad deal, not joining the partnership would be better than experiencing the adverse effects of the entry of cheap agricultural products on Philippine farmers. More developed countries in the TPP enjoy comparative advantages in terms of agricultural technology and state subsidies with which the agricultural industry of the Philippines is at a disadvantage.

=== Comprehensive Agrarian Reform Program ===
In 1988, Republic Act No. 6657, otherwise known as the Comprehensive Agrarian Reform Law (CARL) was signed into law and became the legal basis for the implementation of the Comprehensive Agrarian Reform Program (CARP). It is an act instituting a CARP with the aim of promoting social justice and industrialization. RA 6657 also provided the mechanism for its implementation. It was signed by President Corazon C. Aquino on June 10.

Roxas stressed the need to improve on the Comprehensive Agrarian Reform Program, saying it has not been as successful as it was hoped to be since it has not alleviated poverty.

He said that the CARP expires by 2008 and by law there is a need to review it, and, "as in life, what may have been appropriate 20 years ago may not be appropriate anymore today."

"So, if CARP is to be continued, it must be in a different form with more resources. If it is not continued then we must put a different tool in place to alleviate poverty in the countryside," Roxas said.

For Roxas, the CARP, as it has been implemented so far, clearly has not led to greater income and opportunities for those who are supposed to have been its beneficiaries.

CARP was designed as a wealth redistributive program, and land was the focus because it was thought at the time that wealth came from land, he said.

But land in and of itself does not produce wealth, it requires inputs, support, farm to market roads, fair trading, he also said.

=== Pre-need industry ===
Roxas filed Senate Bill No. 105 which seeks to address the absence of a statute that regulates the pre-need industry by establishing the Pre-Need Industry Act of 2007 to govern the operations of firms which issue or sell pre-need plans or similar contracts and investments.

=== SMEs ===
Roxas filed a bill that provides a package of liberal incentives to micro, small and medium enterprises through amendments to the Magna Carta for Small Enterprises (Republic Act 6977)

He said that the micro, small and medium enterprises comprise 99.6 percent of local businesses and employ 70 percent of the Philippines' total work force. But he noted that their full potential has yet to be achieved, as they currently contribute only about 30 percent to the national economy.

“We want to reward our small enterprises for their contributions to the economy by ensuring their access to credit and support services. This is about giving our Filipino companies the chance to realize their potential,” Roxas said.

The salient provisions of the bill he filed include:

- Modifying the classifications of enterprises in terms of size of assets: micro—below P3 million; small—P3 million to P15 million; and medium—above P15 million.
- Mandating the creation of a six-year MSME Development Plan.
- Adjusting the structure and functions of the MSME Development Council to better respond to the needs of the industries.
- Increasing the authorized capital stock of Small Business Corp. from P5 billion to P10 billion, and putting it under the regulation of the Bangko Sentral ng Pilipinas.
- Increasing the mandatory credit allocation of banks to MSMEs from a total of 8 percent to 10 percent of loanable funds.

Roxas, as Senate Committee on Trade and Commerce chair and primary author of R. A. 9501, welcomed on May 22, 2008, the early and historical signing of the law by Gloria Macapagal Arroyo: “After this much-awaited law has taken effect, I look forward to the executive’s proper implementation of this law that would give our small entrepreneurs more tools to grow their businesses and employ more workers.”

=== Taxation ===
He junked a plan of the Bureau of Internal Revenue to impose a steep hike in the common carrier's tax on public utility vehicles in favor of a gradual increase to soften the impact on bus and jeepney operators.

He said the 2,600% tax increase is too much and will likely pass on the cost to commuters.

Roxas said, “if there is a need for an increase, it should not be drastic. There is a principle that any hike in the tax should be gradual, that will enable the bus and jeepney operators to adjust to the changes."

He also filed Senate Bill No. 103 which would exempt minimum wage earners in the private sector and government workers in Salary Grades 1 to 3, amending certain provisions of Republic Act 8424, otherwise known as the National Internal Revenue Code of 1997, as amended.

He believes that the minimum wage earners can no longer afford to be taxed and to be placed in the income tax process in the same manner as higher-earning employees.

Roxas started a campaign against the value-added tax, although he voted in favor of the law when it was being deliberated in the Senate.

== Foreign policy ==
=== Iraq ===
Roxas filed a resolution last July 31, 2007 asking the Department of Foreign Affairs to look into the OFW trafficking issue.

He asked the Department of Labor and Employment to investigate the recruitment of Filipino workers by such firms as First Kuwaiti International in light of findings by the Department of Foreign Affairs that the ban on entry to the war-torn country was being circumvented.

"The continued recruitment of Filipino workers to Iraq, despite the government's deployment ban, is alarming, especially since they are being made to work long hours under extremely stressful conditions," Roxas said in a statement.

The request came in the wake of reports that certain firms outside the country are recruiting private security personnel for posting in Iraq.

Roxas had also been given a briefing by Special Envoy Roy Cimatu on the situation of Filipinos in Iraq following a "fact-finding mission" ordered by President Gloria Macapagal Arroyo last July.

Based on the briefing, the number of Overseas Filipino workers (OFWs) in Iraq has declined from 7,600 in 2004 to 6,647 as of this 2007. Roxas said that the number is still considerable, given that the ban has been in place since 2004.

He stressed that something had to be done to prevent Filipinos from venturing into dangerous areas and the onus fell both on the government and recruitment firms like First Kuwaiti International to take action.

=== Israel-Lebanon conflict ===
During the Israel-Hezbollah conflict last 2006, Roxas expressed sadness that statements of some Philippine diplomatic officials tended to show that the one-country team approach seemed to be ignored in dealing with the crisis.

He said that the government's contingency plan to evacuate thousands of Overseas Filipino workers (OFWs) caught in the Israeli-Hezbollah conflict in Lebanon could be implemented smoothly if Philippine officials would hew closely to the “team one-country approach” that is mandated by a policy under Republic Act 8042, the Migrant Workers Act of 1995.

This policy means that in all diplomatic posts, the ambassador shall act as the head of the team and that all attaches from different offices and departments must follow his or her lead.

He also asked about the government's reintegration plan for returning OFWs. He noted that most workers left their savings and belongings behind and must now start from scratch in rebuilding their lives.

“It is the government’s role to make sure that these workers who have been driven out of work by a war not of their own making, would get the assistance and support that they deserve,” he stressed.

=== Nigeria ===
Roxas warned jobseekers against accepting job offers to Nigeria in light of a series of abductions of foreign workers by different rebel groups in the said country.

He issued the warning as he welcomed the safe return of OFW Albert Bacani Sr. who arrived in Manila after being released by his Nigerian abductors.

"I urge all jobseekers to always check with the POEA and even the DFA on whether conditions in a desired place of work overseas are safe and secure," he said.

== Current issues ==
=== 2007 Glorietta explosion ===
"I feel so sorry for the victims and their families as well as those injured in the bombing incident. My heart goes out to all of them. These innocent people were just out to enjoy some free time in the mall. Nothing can ever justify their unexpected deaths. If indeed C4 was used, then this underscores the need for public vigilance and stricter security measures within legal boundaries. This is a major setback for our economy and will greatly affect our image as a progressive and stable country. But our people's spirit is strong and we shall undoubtedly overcome this tragedy as a nation."

— Mar Roxas, statement on Makati bombing incident, October 19, 2007

He said that the bombing can affect the advance of the Philippines' economy, but still believed the Filipino people can overcome the crisis.

=== Estrada conviction ===
In order to finally put a just closure to national divisiveness, Roxas filed Senate Resolution No. 135 calling on President Gloria Macapagal Arroyo to issue a pardon to former President Joseph Ejercito Estrada (popularly known as "Erap") at the appropriate time.

Roxas said, "Our people have been divided due to the politics of the last 20 years. But while our people are fragmented, they share one thing: they remain poor, and it is because our politics has failed to pay attention to them."

"I urge the President to initiate the difficult process of uniting our people and finally focusing on the real problems that our people experience. Pardoning Erap at the appropriate time would be a step towards unity," he stressed.

"The grant of pardon to Erap on humanitarian grounds should not in any way be construed as condoning corruption, or as diminishing the legal weight of the ruling of the Sandiganbayan, but serves solely as an embodiment of the people's will for closure on one of the most divisive chapters of our national life," he added.

He also let Malacañang decide whether to issue a conditional or absolute pardon. An absolute pardon would erase the conviction and Estrada would no longer require him to return the money he had allegedly stolen and to surrender the properties that he had acquired from the fruits of the plunder.

=== Japan-Philippine Economic Partnership Agreement ===
"In trade negotiations, no deal is always better than a bad deal." This is what Roxas said on JPEPA.

He issued a warning after President Gloria Macapagal Arroyo pressed on the Senate to ratify the Japan-Philippine Economic Partnership Agreement (JPEPA) amid concerns aired by Tokyo for the early approval.

Roxas was optimistic that the pact would be given serious consideration by the Senate if the government revised the deal to get a better trade-off.

Roxas, said that a renegotiation is a possibility as he pointed out that it remains unclear what is the sum total of the benefits that the agreement will bring to the country compared to “what we will give up.”

=== Trillanes detention ===
Roxas supports the calls to allow Senator Antonio Trillanes IV to attend the Senate's sessions.

In his press statement, he said, "Our people's choice as stated clearly in the May 14 elections must prevail."

"Senator Trillanes, by virtue of his nearly 12 million votes, should be allowed to attend all Senate functions including our afternoon sessions. He must be permitted to serve the people and the AFP should help him, not hinder him, from performing his new mandate. If this means taking the trouble of escorting him every day to and from the Senate then so be it. The people have spoken and we must respect their decision," he added.

=== ZTE broadband deal ===
Roxas introduced a resolution urging President Gloria Macapagal Arroyo to cancel the Philippine government's National Broadband Network (NBN) project with China's Zhong Xing Telecommunications Equipment (ZTE) Corporation.

Roxas said that the $329.4-million deal "was driven by supply and not by demand" and will not benefit Filipinos. The senator also said the cancellation of the deal would not affect the relationship of the Philippines with China.

Later, after the President scrapped the ZTE deal, he said the government avoided further embarrassment and "domestic turmoil".

This, as he noted the need to tighten the government's approval process for foreign-aided and funded projects to "protect the people's money" against similar disadvantageous deals.

However, Roxas said that his committee will continue to conduct hearings on the ZTE deal, as part of efforts to improve legislation governing government projects.

He debunked the government's claim that P4.7 billion in its communication expenses will be saved as a result of the $330-million contract with ZTE Corp. of China for the National Broadband Network, which seeks to connect government offices.

"Do not say that this P4.7 billion will actually be all totally saved, because a huge portion of this is really government communicating with the citizens," Roxas said.

"You're using these numbers not to help clarify, but to further confuse," Roxas was quoted in a press statement from his office.
