= Abortion in the Philippines =

Abortion in the Philippines is constitutionally prohibited. The constitutional provision that "[The State] shall equally protect the life of the mother and the life of the unborn from conception" was crafted by the Constitutional Commission which drafted the charter with the intention of providing for constitutional protection of the abortion ban, although the enactment of a more definitive provision sanctioning the ban was not successful. The provision is enumerated in several state policies, which are generally regarded in law as unenforceable in the absence of implementing legislation. The 1987 Constitution also contains several other provisions enumerating various state policies. (Note: These provisions include, e.g., the affirmation of labor "as a primary social economic force" (Section 14, Article II); the equal protection of "the life of the mother and the life of the unborn from conception" (Section 12, Article II); the "Filipino family as the foundation of the nation" (Article XV, Section 1); the recognition of Filipino as "the national language of the Philippines" (Section 6, Article XVI), and even a requirement that "all educational institutions shall undertake regular sports activities throughout the country in cooperation with athletic clubs and other sectors" (Section 19.1, Article XIV).) Whether these provisions may, by themselves, be the source of enforceable rights without implementing legislation has been the subject of considerable debate in the legal sphere and before the Supreme Court. (Note: The Court, for example, has ruled that a provision requiring that the State "guarantee equal access to opportunities to public service" could not be enforced without implementing legislation, and thus could not bar the disallowance of so-called "nuisance candidates" in presidential elections. However, in another case the Court held that a provision requiring that the State "protect and advance the right of the people to a balanced and healthful ecology" did not require implementing legislation to become the source of operative rights. Any legal challenge to abortion restrictions in the Philippines would necessarily have to evaluate the legal force given to Section 12, Article II of the Constitution.)

An analysis by the Population Division of the United Nations Department of Economic and Social Affairs concluded that although the Revised Penal Code does not list specific exceptions to the general prohibition on abortion, under the general criminal law principles of necessity as set forth in article 11(4) of the Code, an abortion may be legally performed to save the pregnant woman's life.

== Abortion incidence ==
According to the Philippine Safe Abortion Advocacy Network, an estimated 1.26 million abortions were induced by Filipino women in 2020, significantly higher than a 1994 estimate of 400,000 abortions performed illegally in the Philippines. Seventy percent of unwanted pregnancies in the Philippines end in abortion, according to the WHO. As of 2005, approximately four in five abortions in the Philippines were for economic reasons, often where a woman already has several children and cannot care for another.

While some doctors secretly perform abortions in clinics, the 2,000 to 5,000 peso (US$37 to US$93) fee as of 2005 was too high for many Filipinos, who instead buy abortifacients on the black market, e.g. from vendors near churches, sari-sari stores and bakeries. As of 2006, two-thirds of Filipino women who had abortions attempted to self-induce or seek solutions from those who practice folk medicine. As of 2011, one hundred thousand people ended up in the hospital every year due to unsafe abortions, according to the Department of Health, and 12% of all maternal deaths in 1994 were due to unsafe abortion. Some hospitals have refused to treat complications of unsafe abortion, or operate without anesthesia, as punishment for the patients. In 2000, the Department of Health expanded a 1998 policy called Prevention and Management of Abortion and Its Complications (PMAC) aimed at addressing the complications of unsafe abortion to improve availability of quality of humane post-abortion care services by competent, compassionate, objective and non-judgmental service providers in well-equipped institutions complemented by a supportive environment. In 2018, a new governmental policy strengthening the national framework for postabortion care clarified legal and ethical duties of health service providers and provided formal avenues for redress against abuse.

== The RH Law of 2012 ==
The Responsible Parenthood and Reproductive Health Act of 2012 (RH Law) signed into law by President Benigno Aquino III on December 18, 2012, serves to ensure Filipino people have the access to all services regarding reproductive health to preserve the right to health. The bill ensures accessibility to information about contraception and prevention from sexual abuse and violence. More specifically, the bill allows for services that will not negatively affect pregnancy in order to preserve the family. In other words, abortions and procedures related to as such is not protected under the bill, though post care for people who underwent abortion is protected in this bill.

=== Public views on abortion and the RH Law ===
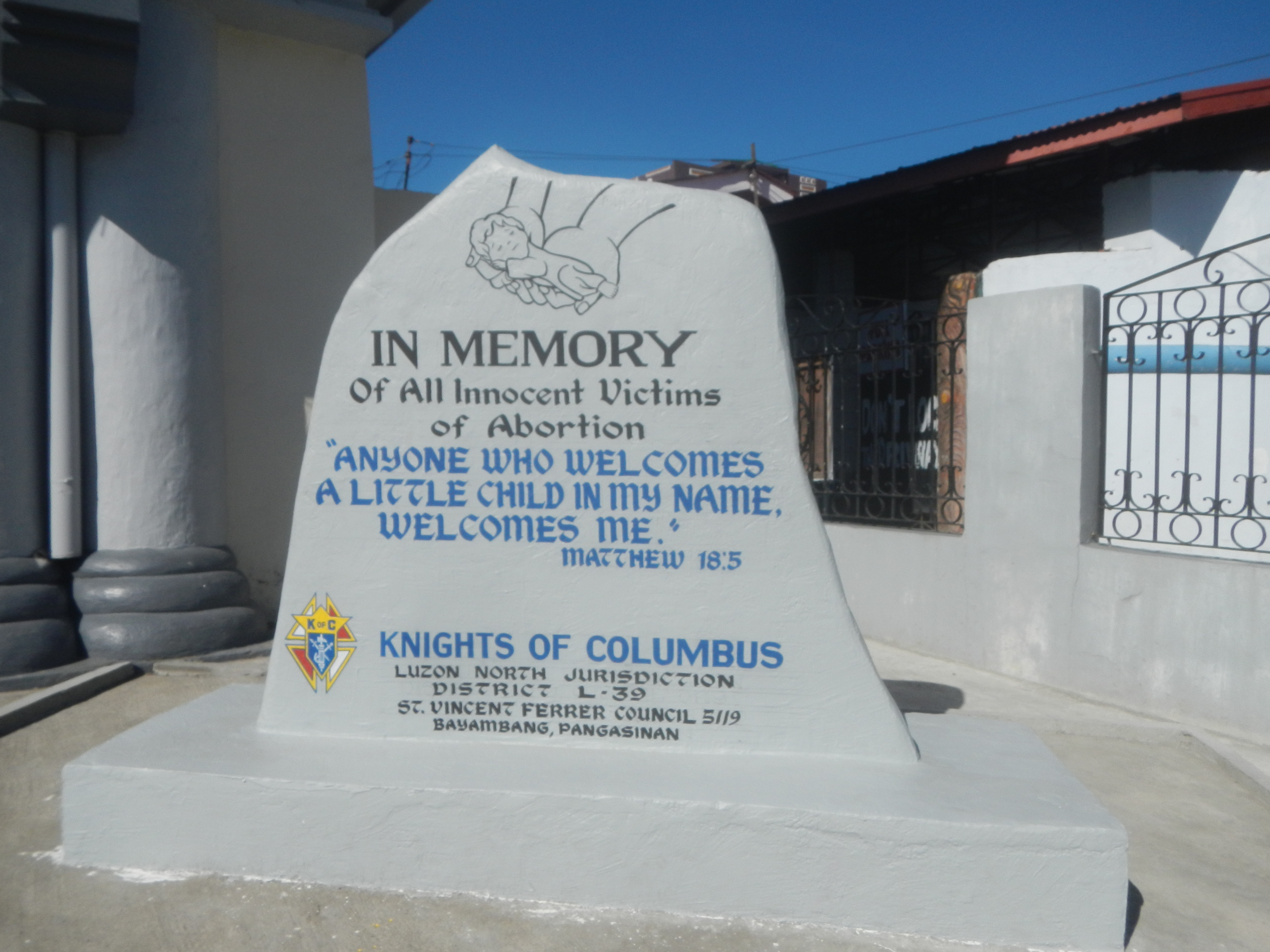
A memorial commemorating "all innocent victims of abortion" at the Bayambang Church

The act was already in debate for decades as oppositional parties mostly related to religious groups like the Catholic Bishops Conference of the Philippines have been very negatively vocal to the enactment of the bill. Due to many arguments and disagreements on both sides, a temporary restraining order from the Supreme Court was put onto the bill to halt distribution and production of certain contraceptives. The Food and Drug Administration found the banned contraceptives to be 'non-abortifacient' which was the main argument that the Supreme Court used to impose the temporary restraining order. The debates about the bill continues today and still there is no mention on the access to safe abortion.

== See also ==
- Abortion law
- Catholic Church and abortion
