= Responsible Parenthood and Reproductive Health Act of 2012 =

Philippine law

Congress of the Philippines
- Long title: An Act providing for a National Policy on Responsible Parenthood and Reproductive Health.
- Citation: Republic Act No. 10354
- Enacted by: House of Representatives of the Philippines
- Enacted: December 19, 2012
- Enacted by: Senate of the Philippines
- Enacted: December 19, 2012
- Signed by: Benigno Aquino III
- Signed: December 21, 2012
- Commenced: January 17, 2013 (Note: Section 30 of the law provides that "this act shall take effect 15 days after its publication in at least two newspapers of general circulation". The law was restrained by the Supreme Court from March 19, 2013 to April 8, 2014.)

Legislative history

Initiating chamber: House of Representatives of the Philippines
- Bill title: An Act providing for a Comprehensive Policy on Responsible Parenthood, Reproductive Health, and Population and Development, and for Other Purposes
- Bill citation: House Bill 4244
- Introduced by: Edcel Lagman (Albay)
- Introduced: January 21, 2011
- First reading: February 21, 2011
- Second reading: December 12, 2012
- Third reading: December 17, 2012

Revising chamber: Senate of the Philippines
- Bill title: An Act providing for a National Policy on Reproductive Health and Population and Development
- Bill citation: Senate Bill 2865 (Note: Legislative History at the Senate)
- Received from the House of Representatives of the Philippines: June 6, 2011
- Member(s) in charge: Pia Cayetano
- First reading: June 6, 2012
- Second reading: December 17, 2012
- Third reading: December 17, 2012

Final stages
- Reported from conference committee: December 19, 2012
- Conference committee bill passed by House of Representatives of the Philippines: December 19, 2012
- Conference committee bill passed by Senate of the Philippines: December 19, 2012

Keywords
- Family planning, reproductive health
- Status: In force

The Responsible Parenthood and Reproductive Health Act of 2012, also known as the Reproductive Health Law or RH Law, and officially designated as Republic Act No. 10354, is a Philippine law that provides universal access to methods of contraception, fertility control, sexual education, and maternal care.

While there is agreement about its provisions on maternal and child health, there is debate on its mandate that the government and private sector will fund, and undertake widespread distribution of family planning devices such as condoms, birth control pills, and IUDs, as the government continues to disseminate information on their use, through health care centers. Although the subject of abortion was heavily discussed in relation to the RH Law, the law does not legalize abortion.

The passage of the legislation was controversial and divisive, with academics, religious institutions, and politicians declaring their support or opposition while it was pending in the legislature. Heated debates and rallies supporting and opposing the Bill took place nationwide. The Supreme Court of the Philippines delayed the implementation of the law in March 2013 in response to challenges. In April 2014, the Court ruled the law was "not unconstitutional" but struck down eight provisions partially or in full.

The history of reproductive health law in the Philippines dates back to 1967 when President Ferdinand Marcos was among the heads of state who signed the Declaration on Population. The 30 countries who participated in the signing of the declaration were acknowledged by U.N. Secretary-General U Thant during a United Nations ceremony on December 11, 1967, a day after Human Rights Day. The Philippines agreed the population problem should be considered as the principal element for long-term economic development. Thus, the Population Commission was created to push for a lower family size norm and provide information and services to lower fertility rates.

Starting in 1967, the United States Agency for International Development (USAID) began shouldering 80% of the total family planning commodities (contraceptives) of the country, which amounted to $3 million annually. In 1975, the U.S. adopted as its policy the National Security Study Memorandum 200: Implications of Worldwide Population Growth for U.S. Security and Overseas Interests (NSSM200). The policy gives "paramount importance" to population control measures and the promotion of contraception among 13 populous countries, including the Philippines, to control rapid population growth which they deem to be inimical to the sociopolitical national interests of the U.S., since the "U.S. economy will require large and increasing amounts of minerals from abroad", and these countries can produce destabilizing opposition forces against the U.S. It recommended the U.S. leadership to "influence national leaders" and that "improved world-wide support for population-related efforts should be sought through increased emphasis on mass media and other population education and motivation programs by the UN, USIA, and USAID."

Different presidents had different points of emphasis. President Marcos pushed for a systematic distribution of contraceptives all over the country, a policy that was called "coercive", by its leading administrator. The Corazon Aquino administration focused on giving couples the right to have the number of children they prefer, while Fidel V. Ramos shifted from population control to management. Joseph Estrada used mixed methods of reducing fertility rates, focusing on mainstreaming natural family planning.

In 1989, the Philippine Legislators' Committee on Population and Development (PLCPD) was established, "dedicated to the formulation of viable public policies requiring legislation on population management and socio-economic development". In 2000, the Philippines signed the Millennium Declaration and committed to attaining the Millennium Declaration Goals by 2015, which include promoting gender equality and health. In 2003, USAID started its phase out of a 33-year-old program by which free contraceptives were given to the country. Aid recipients such as the Philippines, faced the challenge to fund its own contraception program. In 2004, the Department of Health (DOH) introduced the Philippines Contraceptive Self-Reliance Strategy, arranging for the replacement of these donations with domestically provided contraceptives. In August 2010, the government announced collaborative work with the USAID in implementing a comprehensive marketing and communications strategy in favor of family planning called They Have a Plan.

== Content ==
=== Sections ===
Philippine Population Density Map. Darker areas mean higher populations.

The basic content of the Consolidated Reproductive Health Bill is divided into the following sections.

SEC. 1. The Responsible Parenthood and Reproductive Health Act of 2012
SEC. 2. Declaration of Policy
SEC. 3. Guiding Principles
SEC. 4. Definition of Terms
SEC. 5. Midwives for Skilled Attendance
SEC. 6. Emergency Obstetric Care
SEC. 7. Access to Family Planning
SEC. 8. Maternal and Newborn Health Care in Crisis Situations
SEC. 9. Maternal Death Review
SEC. 10. Role of the Food and Drug Administration
SEC. 11. Procurement and Distribution of Family Planning Supplies
SEC. 12. Integration of Family Planning and Responsible Parenthood Component in Anti-Poverty Programs
SEC. 13. Roles of Local Government in Family Planning Programs
SEC. 14. Benefits for Serious and Life-Threatening Reproductive Health Conditions
SEC. 15. Mobile Health Care Service
SEC. 16. Mandatory Age-Appropriate Reproductive Health and Sexuality Education
SEC. 17. Additional duty of the local population officer
SEC. 18. Certificate of Compliance
SEC. 19. Capability Building of Barangay Health Workers
SEC. 20. Pro Bono Services for Indigent Women
SEC. 21. Sexual and Reproductive health
SEC. 22. Right to Reproductive Health Care Information
SEC. 23. Implementing Mechanisms
SEC. 24. Reporting Requirements
SEC. 25. Congressional Committee
SEC. 26. Prohibited Acts
SEC. 27. Penalties
SEC. 28. Appropriations
SEC. 29. Implementing Rules and Regulations
SEC. 30–32. Separability Clause, Repealing Clause, Effectivity

==== Summary of major provisions ====
The bill mandates the government to "promote, without biases, all effective natural and modern methods of family planning that are medically safe and legal."

Although abortion is recognized as illegal and punishable by law, the bill states that "the government shall ensure that all women needing care for post-abortion complications shall be treated and counseled in a humane, non-judgmental and compassionate manner".

The bill calls for a "multi-dimensional approach" integrates a component of family planning and responsible parenthood into all government anti-poverty programs. Age-appropriate reproductive health and sexuality education is required from grade five to fourth year high school using "life-skills and other approaches."

The bill also mandates the Department of Labor and Employment to guarantee the reproductive health rights of its female employees. Companies with fewer than 200 workers are required to enter into partnership with health care providers in their area for the delivery of reproductive health services.

Employers with more than 200 employees shall provide reproductive health services to all employees in their own respective health facilities. Those with fewer than 200 workers shall enter into partnerships with health professionals for the delivery of reproductive health services. Employers shall inform employees of the availability of family planning. They are also obliged to monitor pregnant working employees among their workforce and ensure they are provided paid half-day prenatal medical leaves for each month of the pregnancy period that they are employed.

The national government and local governments will ensure the availability of reproductive health care services like family planning and prenatal care.

Any person or public official who prohibits or restricts the delivery of legal and medically safe reproductive health care services will be meted penalty by imprisonment or a fine.

== Support ==
Free choice regarding reproductive health enables people, especially the poor, to have the number of children they want and can feasibly care and provide for. There are several studies cited by those who support the bill:

- Economic studies, especially the experience in Asia, show that rapid population growth and high fertility rates, especially among the poor, exacerbate poverty and make it harder for the government to address it.
- Poverty incidence is higher among big families. Smaller families and wider birth intervals could allow families to invest more in each child's education, health, nutrition and eventually reduce poverty and hunger at the household level
- Studies show that 44% of the pregnancies in the poorest quintile are unanticipated, and among the poorest women who would like to avoid pregnancy, at least 41% do not use any contraceptive method because of lack of information or access and "among the poorest families, 22% of married women of reproductive age express a desire to avoid pregnancies but are still not using any family planning method"
- Use of contraception, which the World Health Organization has listed as essential medicines, will lower the rate of abortions as it has done in other parts of the world, according to the Guttmacher Institute
- An SWS survey of 2008 showed that 71% of the respondents are in favor of the bill

Among the women's groups and other nongovernmental organizations that supported the passage of the Reproductive Health Bill were Akbayan Party List and Gabriela Women's Party, the Freedom from Debt Coalition, Coalition Against Trafficking in Women Asia Pacific, Philippine Rural Reconstruction Movement - Gender Desk, Sanlakas Women, WomanHealth Philippines, Women's Crisis Center, Zone One Tondo Organization, and Health Alliance for Democracy.

== Criticism ==
Opponents of the bill argue that:

- People's freedom to access contraceptives is not restricted by any opposing law, being available in family planning NGOs, stores, etc. The country is not a welfare state: taxpayer's money should not be used for personal practices that are harmful and immoral; it can be used to inform people of the harm of BCPs.
- The penal provisions constitute a violation of free choice and conscience, and establishes religious persecution

President Aquino stated he was not an author of the bill. He also stated that he gives full support to a firm population policy, educating parents to be responsible, providing contraceptives to those who ask for them, but he refuses to promote contraceptive use. He said that his position "is more aptly called responsible parenthood rather than reproductive health".

The Catholic Bishops' Conference of the Philippines and other church groups were among those that lobbied against the passage of the Reproductive Health Bill.

== Economic and demographic premises ==
The Philippines is the 39th most densely populated country, with a density over 335 per square kilometer, and the population growth rate is 1.9% (2010 Census), 1.957% (2010 est. by CIA World Factbook), or 1.85% (2005–2010 high variant estimate by the UN Population Division, World Population Prospects: The 2008 Revision) coming from 3.1 in 1960.

The 2013 total fertility rate (TFR) is 3.20 births per woman, from a TFR of 7 in 1960. In addition, the total fertility rate for the richest quintile of the population is 2.0, which is about one third the TFR of the poorest quintile (5.9 children per woman). The TFR for women with college education is 2.3, about half that of women with only an elementary education (4.5 children per woman).

Congressman Lagman states that the bill "recognizes the verifiable link between a huge population and poverty. Unbridled population growth stunts socioeconomic development and aggravates poverty".

The University of the Philippines School of Economics presented two papers in support of the bill: Population and Poverty: the Real Score (2004), and Population, Poverty, Politics and the Reproductive Health Bill (2008). According to these economists, which include Solita Monsod, Gerardo Sicat, Cayetano Paderanga, Ernesto M. Pernia, and Stella Alabastro-Quimbo, "rapid population growth and high fertility rates, especially among the poor, do exacerbate poverty and make it harder for the government to address it", while at the same time clarifying that it would be "extreme" to view "population growth as the principal cause of poverty that would justify the government resorting to draconian and coercive measures to deal with the problem (e.g., denial of basic services and subsidies to families with more than two children)". They illustrate the connection between rapid population growth and poverty by comparing the economic growth and population growth rates of Thailand, Indonesia, and the Philippines, wherein the first two grew more rapidly than the Philippines due to lower population growth rates. They stressed that "the experience from across Asia indicates that a population policy cum government-funded [family planning] program has been a critical complement to sound economic policy and poverty reduction".

In Population and Poverty, Aniceto Orbeta, Jr., showed that poverty incidence is higher among big families: 57.3% of Filipino families with seven children are in poverty while only 23.8% of families who have two children live below the poverty threshold.

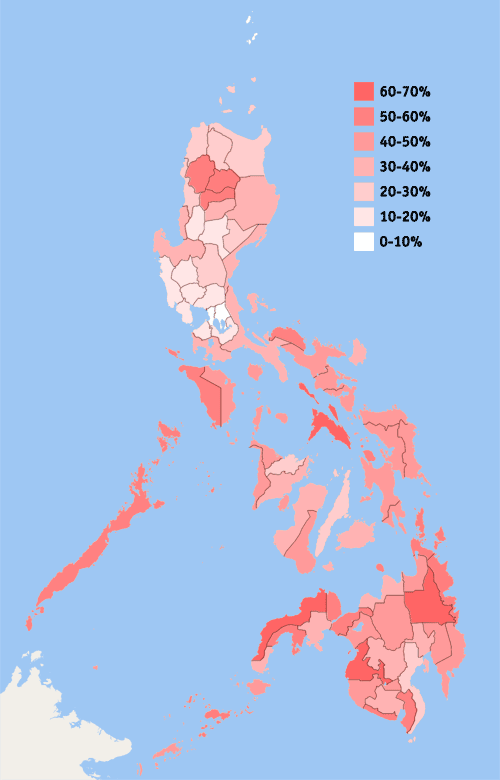
Percentage of population living below poverty line (2003). Darker areas mean more poverty.

Proponents argue that smaller families and wider birth intervals resulting from the use of contraceptives allow families to invest more in each child's education, health, nutrition and eventually reduce poverty and hunger at the household level. At the national level, fertility reduction cuts the cost of social services with fewer people attending school or seeking medical care and as demand eases for housing, transportation, jobs, water, food, and other natural resources. The Asian Development Bank in 2004 also listed a large population as one of the major causes of poverty in the country, together with weak macroeconomic management, employment issues, an underperforming agricultural sector and an unfinished land reform agenda, governance issues including corruption.

=== Criticism of premises ===
Opponents refer to a 2003 study of Rand Corporation, which concluded that "there is little cross-country evidence that population growth impedes or promotes economic growth...population neutralism has in fact been the predominant school in thinking among academics about population growth for the last half-century". For example, the 1992 study of Ross Levine and David Renelt, which covered 119 countries over 30 years (versus a University of the Philippines study of 3 countries over a few years). The RAND study also said that a large population can promote growth given the right fundamentals. Thus, they refer to the HSBC 2012 projection for 2050 that the Philippines will be 16th largest economy due to its large growing population, and those whose populations are decreasing will suffer decline.

Two authors of the Reproductive Health Bill appealed to their colleagues to remove provisions regarding population and development in the consolidated bill. Reps. Emerciana de Jesus and Luzviminda Ilagan wanted to delete three provisions that state that "gender equality and women empowerment are central elements of reproductive health and population and development", which integrate responsible parenthood and family planning programs into anti-poverty initiatives, and which name the Commission on Population and Development or POPCOM as a coordinating body. The two party-list representatives stated that poverty is not due to overpopulation but because of inequality and corruption.

The Wall Street Journal in July 2012 said that Aquino's "promotion of a 'reproductive health' bill is jarring" since it could lead to "a demographic trap of too few workers. The Philippines doesn't have too many people, it has too few pro-growth policies".

Opposing the bill, former Finance Secretary Roberto de Ocampo wrote that it is "truly disingenuous for anyone to proceed on the premise that the poor are to blame for the nation's poverty." He emphasized that the government should apply the principle of first things first and focus on the root causes of the poverty (e.g., poor governance, corruption) and apply many other alternatives to solve the problem (e.g., giving up pork barrel, raising tax collection efficiency).

== Maternal health and deaths ==
Maternal deaths in the Philippines, according to the World Health Organization, is at 5.7 per day.

The proponents state that the passage of the RH Bill would mean:

- Access to information on natural and modern family planning
- Improvement of maternal, infant, and child health and nutrition
- Promotion of breast feeding
- Prevention of abortion and management of post-abortion complications
- Improvement of adolescent and youth health
- Prevention and management of reproductive tract infections, HIV/AIDS and other STDs
- Elimination of violence against women
- Counseling on sexuality and sexual and reproductive health
- Treatment of breast and reproductive tract cancers
- Male involvement and participation in reproductive health issues
- Prevention and treatment of infertility
- Reproductive health education for the youth

The Department of Health states that family planning can reduce maternal mortality by about 32%. The bill is "meant to prevent maternal deaths related to pregnancy and childbirth", said Clara Padilla of Engender Rights. She reported that every day, "there are 11 women dying while giving birth in the Philippines. These preventable deaths could have been avoided if more Filipino women have access to reproductive health information and healthcare."

The key to solving maternal deaths, according to the Senate Policy Brief on reproductive health, is the establishment of birthing centers.

The Philippine Medical Association (PMA) stated in their Position Paper that the goal of reducing the rise of maternal and child deaths "could be attained by improving maternal and child health care without the necessity of distributing contraceptives. The millions of funds intended for the contraceptive devices may just well be applied in improving the skills of our health workers in reducing maternal and child mortality in the Philippines".

=== Magna Carta for Women ===
Senator Majority Floor Leader Tito Sotto said that the RH Bill is redundant to a 2009 law referred to as the Magna Carta for Women, which contains reproductive health provisions, asking the Senate to drop the bill.

=== Access ===
One of the main concerns of the proponents is the perceived lack of access to family planning devices such as contraceptives and sterilization. The bill intends to provide universal access through government funding, complementing thus private sector initiatives for family planning services, such as those offered by the International Planned Parenthood Federation (IPPF) which supports the Family Planning Organizations of the Philippines and the 97 organizations of the Philippine NGO Council.

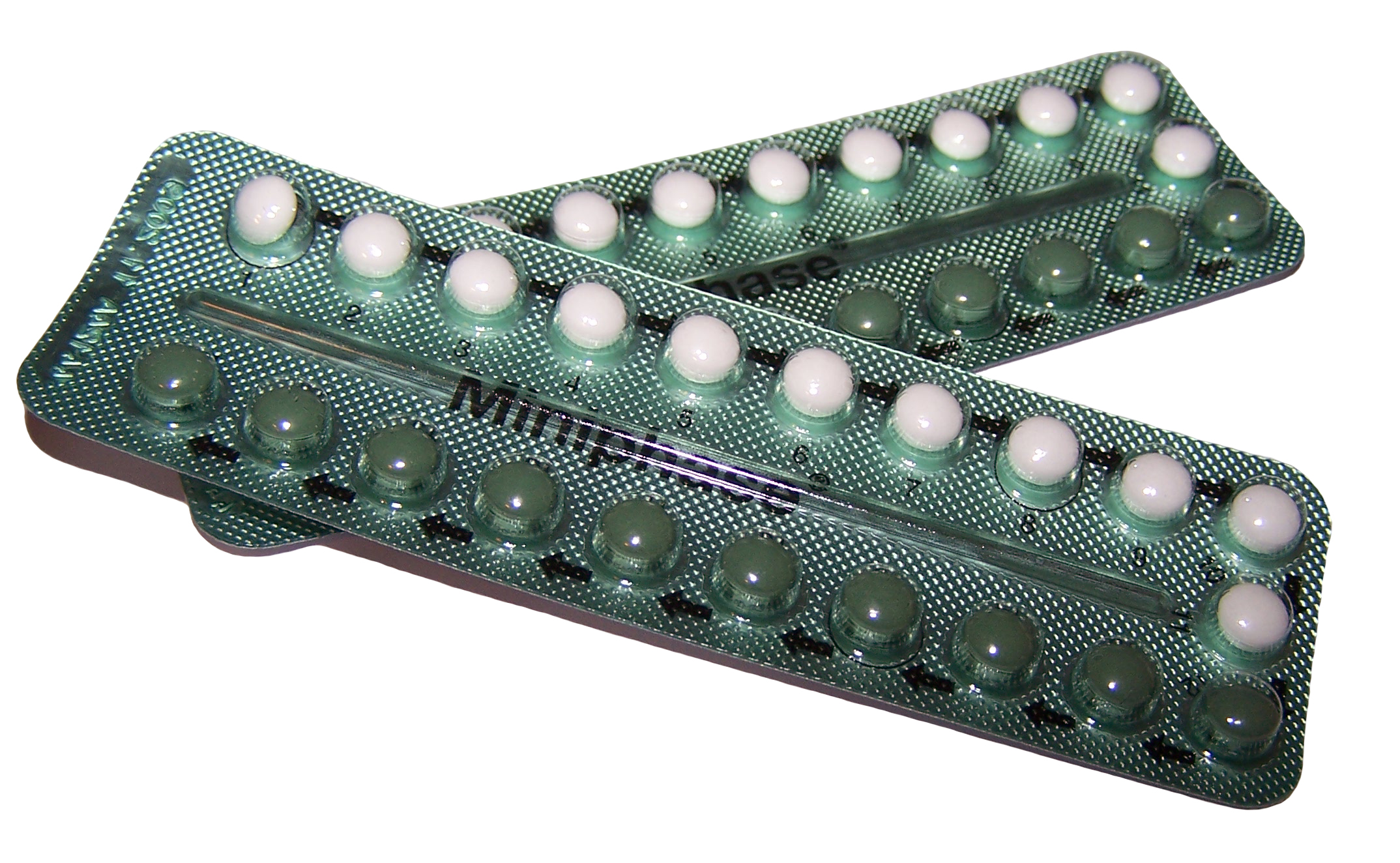
Birth control pill

The UP School of Economics argues, in contrast, that there is lack of access especially for poor people, because contraceptive use is extremely low among them and "among the poorest families, 22% of married women of reproductive age express a desire to avoid pregnancies but are still not using any family planning method". They say that lack of access leads to a number of serious problems which demand attention: (1) "too many and too closely-spaced children raises the risk of illness and premature deaths (for mother and child alike)," (2) "the health risks associated with mistimed and unwanted pregnancies are higher for adolescent mothers, as they are more likely to have complications during labor," (3) women who have mistimed pregnancies are "constrained to rely more on public education and health services and other publicly provided goods and services", further complicating limited public resources, (4) families are not able to achieve their desired family size. Thus the UP economists "strongly and unequivocally support" the thrust of the bill to enable "couples and individuals to decide freely and responsibly the number and spacing of their children and to have the information and means to carry out their decisions". Proponents argue that government-funded access is the key to breaking the inter-generational poverty that many people are trapped in.

=== Natural family planning ===
Proponents of the bill contend that "natural family planning methods have not proven to be as reliable as artificial means of birth control".

== Abortion ==
=== Abortifacient issue ===
According to the RH bill, one of its components is "prevention of abortion and management of post-abortion complications". It provides that "the government shall ensure that all women needing care for post-abortion complications shall be treated and counseled in a humane, non-judgmental and compassionate manner". It also states that "abortion remains a crime and is punishable", as the Constitution declares that "the State shall equally protect the life of the mother and the life of the unborn from conception".

The position of the Philippine Medical Association (PMA) "is founded strongly on the principle that 'life or conception begins at fertilization' at that moment where there is fusion or union of the sperm and the egg and thus a human person or human being already does exist at the moment of fertilization". The PMA condemns abortifacients that "destroys the fertilized egg or the embryo" and "abhors any procedure...or medication that will interrupt any stage of fertilization and prevents its normal, physiological, uninterrupted growth to adulthood".

Jo Imbong, founder of the Abay Pamilya Foundation, reported that "Lagman said in a House hearing that the bill would protect human life 'from implantation' ", and not from fertilization, noting at the same time that the Records of the Constitutional Commission state that "Human life begins at fertilization".

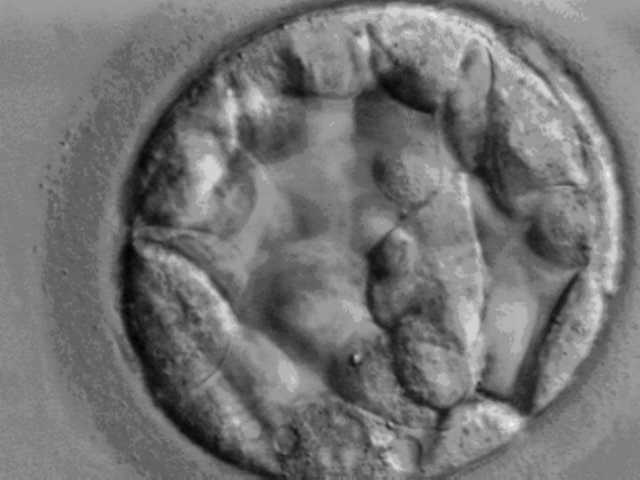
5-day old human embryo called a blastocyst, which comprises 70–100 cells.

=== Contraception and abortion relationship ===
Proponents argue that research by the Guttmacher Institute, involved in advancing international reproductive health, reveals that the use of contraceptives can reduce abortion rates by 85%. Proponents such as 14 Ateneo de Manila University professors, argued thus: "Studies show that the majority of women who go for an abortion are married or in a consensual union (91%), the mother of three or more children (57%), and poor (68%) (Juarez, Cabigon, and Singh 2005). For these women, terminating a pregnancy is an anguished choice they make in the face of severe constraints. When women who had attempted an abortion were asked their reasons for doing so, their top three responses were: they could not afford the economic cost of raising another child (72%); their pregnancy occurred too soon after the last one (57%); and they already have enough children (54%). One in ten women (13%) who had attempted an abortion revealed that this was because her pregnancy resulted from forced sex (ibid.). Thus, for these women, abortion has become a family planning method, in the absence of information on and access to any reliable means to prevent an unplanned and unwanted pregnancy".

The bill, said Clara Padilla of EnGender Rights Inc, will "help reduce the number of abortions by providing increased access to information and services on modern contraceptive methods, that in turn will reduce the number of unwanted—and often aborted—pregnancies".

Both sides of the debate accuse the other side of deception and misleading the public. The pro-RH people accuse the anti-RH group of misleading the public by calling the bill an abortion bill, when the bill states that abortion remains a crime and is punishable. The anti-RH advocates accuse the RH supporters of hiding from the public the international population control agenda which includes abortion and they refer to U.S. Secretary Hillary Clinton who said that RH includes abortion.

== Contraceptives ==
=== Morality and social effects ===
Fourteen professors from Ateneo de Manila University, a prominent Catholic University, considering the empirical evidence of the dire socioeconomic conditions of the Filipino poor, urged that the bill be passed to help them. They argued: "As Catholics and Filipinos, we share the hope and mission of building a Church of the Poor. We are thus deeply disturbed and saddened by calls made by some members of the Catholic Church to reject a proposed legislation that promises to improve the wellbeing of Filipino families, especially the lives of women, children, adolescents, and the poor". They announced that "Catholic social teachings recognize the primacy of the well-formed conscience over wooden compliance to directives from political and religious authorities", urging Catholic authorities to withdraw their opposition the bill. Citing Catholic documents and scientific studies, they reasoned that "the RH Bill is pro-life, pro-women, pro-poor, pro-youth, and pro-informed choice". They emphasized that the bill "promotes quality of life, by enabling couples, especially the poor, to bring into the world only the number of children they believe they can care for and nurture to become healthy and productive members of our society". Thus, they called their paper "Catholics Can Support the RH Bill in Good Conscience".

In response, the Ateneo administration announced its unity with Catholic teaching and that it had "serious objections to the present bill".

Proponents such as Lagman also stressed that official Catholic teaching itself, expressed in the Encyclical Humanae Vitae issued only forty years ago in 1964, is not infallible. He said that the Papal Commission on Birth Control, which included ranking prelates and theologians, recommended that the Church change its teaching on contraception as it concluded that "the regulation of conception appears necessary for many couples who wish to achieve a responsible, open and reasonable parenthood in today's circumstances". The editorial of the Philippine Daily Inquirer, moreover, stated that Catholic teaching is "only" a religious teaching and should not be imposed with intolerance on a secular state.

Opponents argue that misery is not the result of the church which they say is the largest charitable organization in the world, but of a breakdown in moral sense that gives order to society, nor does misery come from parents who bring up children in faithfulness, discipline, love and respect for life, but from those who strip human beings of moral dignity and responsibility, by treating them as mere machines, which they believe contraception does.

=== Health reasons ===
Stating that contraception is a lie and "against the beginning of new life", the Philippine Medical Association also stressed that the "health risks of contraception to women are considerable; the list of side effects is long, and includes high blood pressure, strokes, increased incidence of some forms of cancer".

While the World Health Organization acknowledges the possible negative side effects of the pill, it still defines it as an essential medicine.

Proponents such as E. Ansioco of Democratic Socialist Women of the Philippines argued that "The World Health Organization (WHO) includes contraceptives in its Model Lists of Essential Drugs" and thus are safe medicines. "Medical and scientific evidence," says the main proponent, "shows that all the possible medical risks connected with contraceptives are infinitely lower than the risks of an actual pregnancy and everyday activities...The risk of dying within a year of using pills is 1 in 200,000. The risk of dying from a vasectomy is 1 in 1 million and the risk of dying from using an IUD is 1 in 10 million...But the risk of dying from a pregnancy is 1 in 10,000."

=== HIV/AIDS ===
The RH bill provides for "prevention and treatment of HIV/AIDS and other, STIs/STDs", especially since the number of HIV cases among the young nearly tripled from 41 in 2007 to 110 in 2008. Proponents emphasized that RH will help in stemming the AIDS epidemic that is worsening in the Philippines. Lagman explained that "Globally, the new number of reported cases of HIV infections and deaths has dropped by nearly 20 percent. It is therefore both ironic and tragic that the Philippines' trajectory is towards the other direction. Our country's HIV/AIDS statistics have increased by 30 percent!" Primary among the means is distribution of condoms. The proponents applauded government efforts last February 2010 when it distributed condoms in some areas of Manila.

== Opinion polls and TV debates ==
Proponents refer to many surveys conducted by two prominent locally based organizations (SWS and Pulse Asia) which show majority support for the bill. A survey conducted in 2008 by the Social Weather Stations, commissioned by the Forum for Family Planning and Development (FFPD), a non-government advocacy group, showed that 68 percent of Filipinos agree that there should be a law requiring government to distribute legal contraceptives. SWS President and RH Bill proponent, Mahar Mangahas reported that the "survey found 71 percent in favor [of the RH Bill], 21 percent undecided, and a mere 8 percent opposed. Among those who originally knew of the bill, the score is 84 percent in favor, and 6 percent opposed. Among those who learned of the bill for the first time because of the survey, the score is 59 percent in favor, versus 11 percent opposed." Pulse Asia reported that in an October 2008 survey "most Filipinos are aware of the reproductive health bill pending at the House of Representatives (68%) and are in favor of the bill (63%)". In December 2010, Pulse Asia announced based on the results of an October 2010 survey, 69% of the Filipinos are in favor of the bill.

The President of Prolife Philippines, Lito Atienza, said that the surveys conducted by SWS and Pulse Asia were misleading, because the participants were not fully informed of the bill, were merely aware of it, and informed that it was about health and "modern methods". Instead he referred to the Filipino Family survey of December 2009 conducted by the HB&A International (an affiliate of Louis Harris & Associates) together with the personnel of Asia Research Organization (the Philippine affiliate of Gallup International). The survey concluded that 92% of people in metropolitan Manila rejected the bill, "85 percent are not aware that once passed the RH bill would allow teenagers to secure 'abortifacient devices and substances' without their parents' knowledge and consent...90 percent do not agree that Congress should appropriate P2 billion to the detriment of other essential medicines for free children's vaccinations, treatment of dreaded diseases and other more important health and medical concerns." Mangahas acknowledged that the SWS surveys did not include the penalties.

A TV Debate was also hosted by ABS-CBN in May 2011. Leaders of both sides, including Rep. Lagman and Rep. Golez, were present. According to the ABS-CBN news which reported on the results: "In the SMS poll, 69.58% of votes cast reject the RH bill while 30.42% support it." In the separate online poll held on the Harapan microsite that livestreamed the debate, majority voted against the bill at the very end of the debate.

On TV5's Debate Hamon sa Pagbabago on August 21, 2011, the studio audience voted 100% against the bill, while 58.7% of the viewers voted against the RH Bill via text messaging, versus 41.3% in favor.

The online poll conducted by the Philippine Star published on May 18, 2011, showed that 56% were against the RH Bill, while 44% were in favor.

== Rallies ==
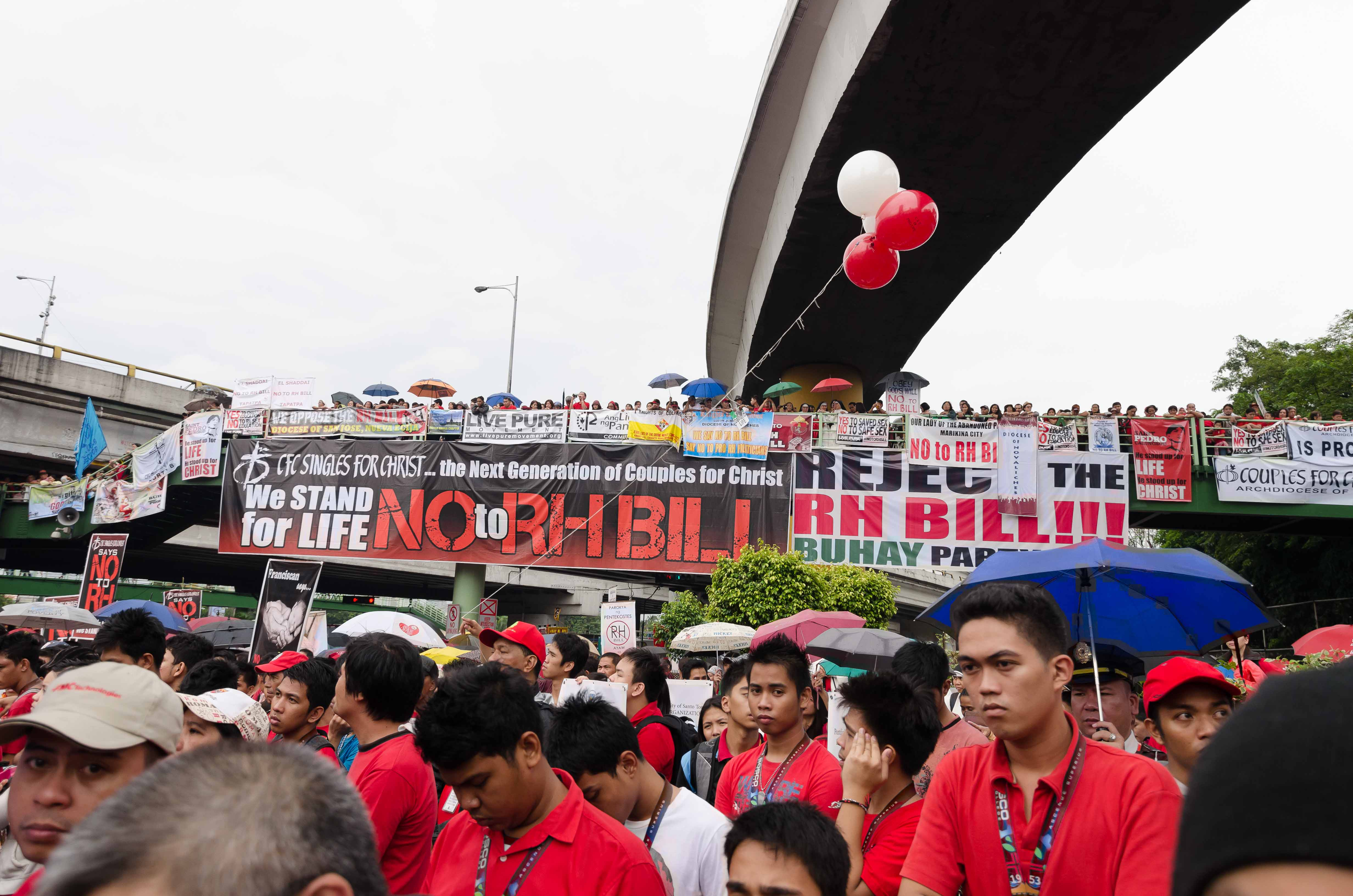
A rally against the bill, held at EDSA on August 4, 2012

Beginning in late 2010, there were rallies for and against the bill.

In the legislative arena, women's rights NGOs like Likhaan organized mobilizations to amplify the voices of impoverished women within broader discussions. They strategically organized urban poor women to participate in rallies, applying pressure on legislators. Consequently, these women were invited to share their experiences during plenary sessions and committee hearings in Congress, specifically addressing the deliberations on the Reproductive Health Bill at that time.

== Penalties ==
There is mandatory sexuality education starting grade 5, and "malicious disinformation" is penalized. All health care service providers which provide reproductive health services, including faith-based hospital administrators, may be imprisoned or fined if they refuse to provide family planning services such as tubal ligation and vasectomy. The same may happen to employers who do not provide free services to employees. Imprisonment ranges from one to six months or a fine ranging from ten thousand pesos (P10,000.00) to fifty thousand pesos (P50,000.00). Former Finance Secretary Roberto de Ocampo stated that these punitive provisions "are tantamount to an affront to civil liberties and smack of religious persecution".

Defending the bill, Felipe Medalla, former dean of the University of the Philippines School of Economics, said that "although the poor's access to family planning services can be improved even without the law, the absence of the law makes it easier to block the program".

== Separation of church and state ==
One of the prelates in the Roman Catholic Church in the Philippines, then Archbishop Luis Antonio Tagle opposed the Reproductive Health Bill, along with abortion and contraception. Because more than 80% of Filipinos are Catholics at least on paper, the Catholic Church exerts a strong influence in certain aspects of public and moral life. Its staunch opposition to the bill has drawn the controversy among non-Catholics and Catholics alike who support the bill whereby many invoke the principle of separation of church and state.

Fr. Joaquin Bernas, S.J, one of the drafters of the Philippine Constitution and a prominent lawyer and writer, explained that the concept of separation of church and state is directed towards the state, rather than the church, as it is a political concept. Technically it means "non-establishment of religion," as the Constitution states, "No law shall be passed respecting an establishment of religion." It means that the state should be guided by the principle that it should support no specific religion and so government funding should not be allocated for building churches or mosques and not favor any particular religion. It does not prevent the church, parents, supervisors, teachers and other moral educators from expressing their views and educating their wards on the morality of their personal and social actions. The Catholic Church also states that their stand is based on secular reasons and natural law that are both acceptable to non-Catholics as well. Proponents, on the other hand, state that the church should not meddle in matters of the state and should focus on religious matters, not political matters.

Although congressional supporters of the bill cited its apparent endorsement by the Christian sect of Iglesia ni Cristo, former Alagad Party-list representative Rodante Marcoleta denied this claim in 2014, stating that the INC remained neutral on the bill during the 15th Congress.

== Culture war and its implications ==
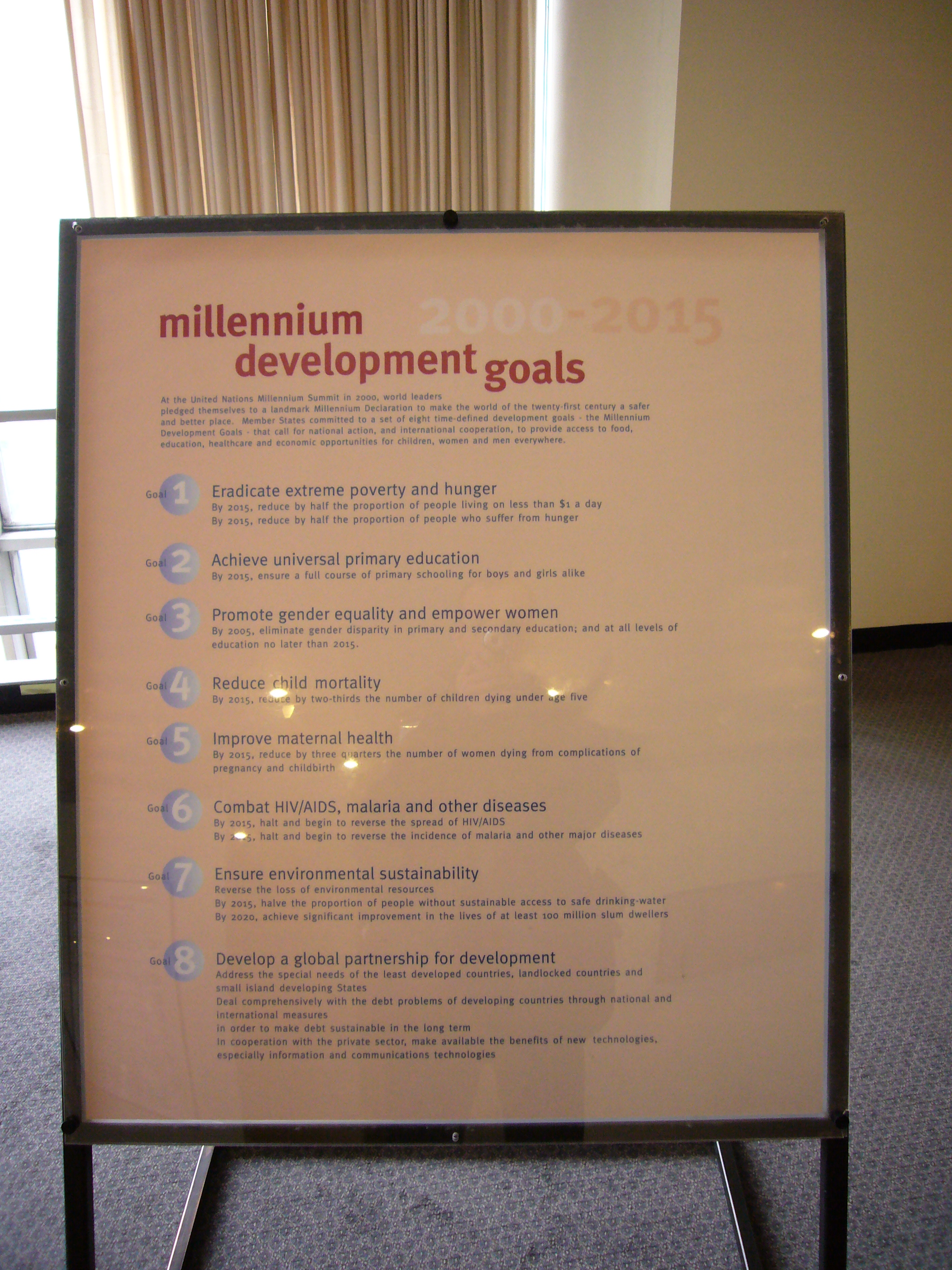
Millennium Development Goals at the UN

The national debate is seen as part of a wider culture war. Passing it or not passing it of the bill has negative implications depending on the views. Proponents state that the not passing the bill will make the Philippines no longer be a backward state and unable to achieve the Millennium Development Goals, especially the points on poverty alleviation and maternal health. It will mean reneging on international commitments and will slow down modernization. Also, the poor will not have free access to family planning support that many have want, and thus will have more children than they can care for and will not have the money to invest in education to break the intergenerational poverty they are trapped in. Proponents also accuse the Catholic Church of holding the Philippines "hostage" and violating the separation of church and state. They argue that a decreased population growth will lead to improved quality of life and economic development.

== Financials ==
The Department of Health proposed ₱13.7 billion to fund the RH Bill if passed in 2012, according to Senator Pia Cayetano.

Filipinos for Life, an anti-abortion organization, claimed that the bill was funded by foreign population control groups, a claim that Rep. Edcel Lagman denied as "an old yarn which is destitute of factual basis", saying that the lobby opposing the bill was the one which was backed by the "wealthy Catholic hierarchy with the aid of dozens of lay organizations".

Young Nine Legislators (Y9L)—including Aliah Dimaporo, Lucy Torres-Gomez, Karlo Alexei Nograles—said that "The proposed P3 billion appropriation for the RH bill, if put towards education, can help secure the future of young Filipinos. That amount can build 4,644 new classrooms…or it can subsidize the college education of 300,000 scholars—a chance for underprivileged student achievers to earn their diploma".

Lagman on the other hand said that both these priorities are important but with a burgeoning population the budget will become even tighter, thus population growth is a major issue.

== International reactions ==
=== European Union ===
European Union Ambassador to the Philippines Alistair MacDonald said "We have all seen the figures on illegal abortion a year in the Philippines and I very much hope that both Houses of Congress will take these issues into account in producing a reproductive health legislation which will really help people make their own choices and to provide for their families."

MacDonald said that lack of effective access to reproductive health services in the Philippines was "antithetical" to the country's struggle against poverty and "It seems to me extremely unlikely that the Philippines will be able to meet its commitment under the MDGs under the present policy." MacDonald noted that the total fertility rate for the richest quintile of the population is 2.0, while the total fertility rate of the poorest quintile is 5.9. The total fertility rate for women with a college education is 2.3, about half that of women with only elementary education (4.5). He mentioned that the lack of access to RH services is anti-women, citing the slow decline in the maternal mortality ratio in the Philippines. He also said surveys suggest that the total wanted fertility rate for the Philippines is 2.4 children, or below the actual TFR of 3.3 children.

== Status ==
=== Legislature ===
On January 31, 2011, six different bills were consolidated into a single RH Bill which was then unanimously approved for plenary debate by the House Committee on Population and Family Relations. On February 7, 2011, the bill was scheduled to go before the House Appropriations Committee. On February 16, 2011, the bill was endorsed by the House Appropriations Committee with amendment and referred back to the Population Committee for finalizing the language.

=== President and Cabinet ===
President Noynoy Aquino during the presidential campaign said that it confounds him why he is always associated with the RH Bill and reiterated that he is neither an author nor a co-author and did not sign the committee report regarding the bill. He said that "he will fully support the crafting of a firm policy that will address the serious problem on population" At the same time, Aquino said that "artificial contraception was a matter of choice and conscience and that health professionals who fool people into using artificial contraceptives should be penalized. As a Catholic, Aquino said he himself was not promoting artificial contraception but believes that the government should be able to provide it to Filipinos who ask for it". Aquino stressed, "I'm a Catholic, I'm not promoting it. My position is more aptly called responsible parenthood rather than reproductive health."

According to Rina Jimenez David who is pro-RH, during the "Women Deliver Philippines" Conference held September 2010, Dinky Soliman, Aquino's Secretary of Social Welfare and Development, said that "choice and access" constituted the keystone of the Aquino government's policy, reiterating the administration's support for the pending reproductive health bills.

In December 2010, the Cabinet and the CBCP agreed to have a joint campaign providing full information on the advantages and risks of contraceptives, natural and artificial family planning and responsible parenthood. They have established a technical working group for this purpose. They also agreed that government will not be an "instrument to enforce or violate the conscience of the people about these issues."

However, by April 2011 Aquino has given his full support to the entire RH Bill in a speech at the University of the Philippines Diliman and promised to push for its passage even at the "risk of excommunication."

=== Compromise and alternatives ===
Senate President Juan Ponce Enrile, Congressman Roilo Golez and Buhay party-list separately filed bills that seek to restrict abortion and birth control use. These bills have been seen either as a nullification of the RH Bill, its alternative, or as a way of achieving unity among the populace, since the RH Bill proponents have stated their concern in preventing abortion.

Presidential candidate Gilbert Teodoro or Gibo suggested a cash transfer from the government to individuals wanting access to family planning methods, whether natural or artificial. The individuals can then make use of the cash they receive to purchase birth control devices they may choose, thus guaranteeing freedom of choice.

The Loyola School of Theology and the John J. Carroll Institute on State and Church Issues issued nine talking points on the RH Bill. Among other points, they proposed a study on the meaning of conception in the Constitution, and if it means fertilization, abortifacients "are to be banned even now and regardless of whether the RH Bill is passed". They also proposed "parallel programs for providing information and training, one for Natural Family Planning (NFP) and another for artificial methods of family planning". Columnist Jose Sison of the Philippine Star criticized that "a Catholic School of theology has actually proposed in public, the use of tax payers' money to train Filipinos to employ methods that are objectively and intrinsically evil" and cites "empirical evidence and scientific proofs confirming the harmful and evil effects of contraceptives to individuals and to society."

=== Other events 2010–2012 ===
In September 2010, Aquino, during this visit to the U.S., reiterated his stand that he is in favor of responsible parenthood and respects the decision of each couple as to the number of children they want, and if they need the government support for contraception, the government will provide it. This statement has created a furor as Catholic church leaders say that Aquino has sold out the Filipino soul in exchange for some "measly" aid from the U.S. The President of the Catholic Bishops Conference said that there could be an excommunication of the President if he continues his stance. Pro-RH Bill senators encouraged the President to be steadfast to do his duties towards the state. The President's spokesperson Edwin Lacierda explained that the President "has not changed his stand" and is reaching out to the prelates and said that he has not made any decision in support of the Reproductive Health Bill as he was still studying the document. Lacierda said that the Executive Branch "is not involved in the passage of the RH bill, saying the measure's fate rests solely on the legislative branch."

Filipino Freethinkers, an association of agnostics, atheists, progressives, etc., very active in the fight in favor of the RH bill, stepped up the pressure, creating more controversy that fired up renewed interest in the bill on both sides. On September 30, 2010, one of the freethinkers, Carlos Celdran staged a protest action against the Catholic Church, holding a sign which read "DAMASO," a reference to the villainous, corrupt clergyman Father Dámaso of the novel Noli Me Tangere by Filipino revolutionary writer Jose Rizal, and shouting "stop getting involved in politics!" A fan page, Free Carlos Celdran was created in Facebook, which generated 23,808 fans in 24 hours. Francisco Montalvan of the Inquirer said that in the end the Damasos are the scheming, corrupt and deceptive people, implying that the "pro-death advocates" are these, while the Cardinal Rosales who started a nationwide fund for the poor is very far from Damaso. Meanwhile, the Imam Council of the Philippines, the top leaders of the Moslem population which at 4.5 million constitutes 5% of the Philippine population, declared that they are against contraceptives since using them "underestimates God" and "makes one lose morality in the process."

During the first public hearing on Nov 24, the chair of the Committee on Population handling the bill said that there is no instruction from the Speaker of the House to expedite the bill. Upon the call of anti-RH congressmen, the Committee Chair decided to refer the bill also to the Committee on Health since the bill is about Reproductive Health. Leader of the pro-RH group, Elizabeth Ansioco, said that the bill is doomed if it is referred to the Committee on Health. Anti-RH Deputy Speaker Congressman Pablo Garcia said the members of the Committee on Health knew of the WHO announcement on the carcinogenicity of combined estrogen-progestogen oral contraceptives.

House Speaker Belmonte said that Congress is not likely to rush the legislation of the bill and will tackle it in plenary early next year. Belmonte said it is better that highly contentious bills be given more attention.

On December 3, the Senate cut the proposed budget of P 880M for contraceptives down to P 8M for condoms since other contraceptives violated the Constitution's ban on abortifacients, and Senator Tito Sotto III said that his constituents never asked for contraceptives.

On July 27, 2012, the Speaker of the House decided to put to a vote, by August 7, 2012, on whether the debates have to be terminated. Meanwhile, six co-authors of the bill withdrew support, with the head of the minority group of the house declaring that eight of their group are withdrawing their previous support for the bill.

=== Congressional approval and presidential assent ===
At 3 in the morning on December 13, 2012, the House of Representatives voted on second reading in favor of the bill with 113–109 while five representatives abstained. In the upper house, the Senate voted, on December 18, 2012, to pass the bill on second reading with 13–8, while Senators Sergio Osmeña III and Lito Lapid were absent.

On the same day, both houses passed the bill on the third and final reading. Members of the House of Representatives voted 133–79, while seven representatives abstained. The Senate registered 13–8, the same result as the second reading.

On December 19, 2012, both versions of the bill were passed to the Bicameral Committee to produce a final version to be signed by the President Aquino. The committee quickly passed the bill in just one session. It was transmitted back to the House of Representatives and the Senate, which both ratified the bill, with the Senate voting 11–5 in favor of ratification, and the House of Representatives voting via voice vote.

On December 21, 2012, President Aquino signed the bill into law, codifying the bill as Republic Act No. 10354, otherwise known as the "Responsible Parenthood and Reproductive Health Act of 2012". News of the signing was announced by House Majority Leader Neptali Gonzales II on December 28, 2012.

=== Supreme Court challenge and delay of implementation ===
In response to petitions challenging the law's constitutionality, the Supreme Court voted 10–5 on March 19, 2013, to issue a status quo ante order halting the implementation of the law for four months. Oral arguments were set for June 18 but postponed until July 9 after the Supreme Court received additional petitions and interventions.

During oral arguments, several justices indicated that the court "does not seem to be the right forum–at least for now." It could not settle medical issues, such as whether any contraceptives to be made available were actually abortifacients. Chief Justice Maria Lourdes Sereno said the court might have no choice but to exercise "judicial restraint" on the 15 petitions opposing the law.

On July 16, the justices voted 8–7 to extend the status quo ante order, which would have expired the next day "until further orders effective immediately." Oral arguments concluded on August 27, with the petitioners against and for the law being instructed to submit memorandums within 60 days.

On April 8, 2014, the Supreme Court upheld the constitutionality of the law. The justices, however, struck down eight provisions of the law partially or in full.

In 2015, the Supreme Court's issued a temporary restraining order on certain provisions of the law, forbidding the distribution of contraceptive implants.

Notwithstanding the restraining order on certain methods of contraception, in September 2018, President Duterte decided to ensure, within 2018, free contraception for 6 million women with unmet needs for modern family planning – in 2018, for 2 million women identified as poor, and later for further 4 million women.

== Readings and external links ==
=== Full text of the bills ===
- House Bill No. 4244
- Senate Bill No. 2865

=== Supporting the RH Bill ===
- Edcel Lagman (June 1, 2010). "House Bill No. 96: An Act Providing For a National Policy on Reproductive Health, Responsible Parenthood and Population and Development and Other Purposes" (PDF). Philippine NGO Council on Population, Health and Welfare Inc. Archived from the original (PDF) on November 22, 2010.
- "Full text of House Bill No. 5043 (Reproductive Health and Population Development Act of 2008)". web log. Jaromay Laurente Pamaos Law Offices. September 22, 2008.
- Elizabeth Angsioco (October 8, 2008). "Arguments for the Reproductive Health Bill". The Manila Times. Archived from the original on July 4, 2009.
- Edcel Lagman (August 3, 2008). "Facts and Fallacies on the Reproductive Health Bill". Philippine Daily Inquirer. Archived from the original on August 7, 2011.
- Ruperto P. Alonzo; Arsenio M. Balisacan; Dante B. Canlas; Joseph J. Capuno; Ramon L. Clarete; Rolando A. Danao; Emmanuel S. de Dios; Benjamin E. Diokno; Emmanuel F. Esguerra; Raul V. Fabella; Ma. Socorro Gochoco-Bautista; Aleli P. Kraft; Felipe M. Medalla; Nimfa F. Mendoza; Solita C. Monsod; Cayetano W. Paderanga, Jr.; Ernesto M. Pernia; Stella A. Quimbo; Gerardo P. Sicat; Orville C. Solon; Edita A. Tan & Gwendolyn R. Tecson (December 2004). "Population and Poverty: the Real Score" (PDF). University of the Philippines School of Economics. DP2004-15. Archived from the original (PDF) on October 3, 2011.
- Promoting Reproductive Health: A Unified Strategy to Achieve the MDGs (PDF) (Report). Senate of the Philippines Economic Planning Office. July 2009. PB-09-03.
- Ernesto M. Pernia; Stella Alabastro-Quimbo; Maria Joy V. Abrenica; Ruperto P. Alonzo; Agustin L. Arcenas; Arsenio M. Balisacan; Dante B. Canlas; Joseph J. Capuno; Ramon L. Clarete; Rolando A. Danao; Emmanuel S. de Dios; Aleli dela Paz-Kraft; Benjamin E. Diokno; Emmanuel F. Esguerra; Raul V. Fabella; Maria Socorro Gochoco-Bautista; Teresa J. Ho; Dennis Claire S. Mapa; Felipe M. Medalla; Maria Nimfa F. Mendoza; Solita C. Monsod; Toby Melissa C. Monsod; Fidelina Natividad-Carlos; Cayetano W. Paderanga; Gerardo P. Sicat; Orville C. Solon; Edita A. Tan & Gwendolyn R. Tecson (August 11, 2008). "Population, Poverty, Politics and the Reproductive Health Bill". 2010 Presidentiables.
- Marita Castro Guevara; Raymond Aguas; Liane Pena Alampay; et al. (October 15, 2008). "CATHOLICS CAN SUPPORT THE RH BILL IN GOOD CONSCIENCE". 2010 Presidentiables.
- Elizabeth Aguiling-Pangalangan (2010). "A Forum on Population, Development and Reproductive Health" (PDF). Shame of the Nation Series. Philippine Institute for Development Studies. Archived from the original (PDF) on August 13, 2011.
- Clara Padilla (April 11, 2010). "Voting with our Gonads". Philippine Daily Inquirer. Archived from the original on April 13, 2010.
- "Official Statement of Support for the Immediate Passage of the Reproductive Health Bill in the Philippines". Alliance of Young Nurse Leaders and Advocates. October 15, 2010.
- Francisco (Kiko) Bautista, Maria Isabel B. Aguilar (2023). "Sikolohiyang Pilipino : an indigenous Filipino approach to community advocacy for reproductive health" (PDF). Postcolonial Directions in Education. University of Malta.

=== Opposing the RH Bill ===
- Jo Imbong (August 16, 2008). "Reckless and irresponsible". Philippine Daily Inquirer. Archived from the original on August 12, 2011.

=== Other readings ===
- Full text of NSSM 200 (US government source)
- Philippine Family Planning Statistics (National Statistics Office)
